= William B. Taylor (historian) =

William B. Taylor is a historian of colonial Mexico who held the Sonne Chair of History at University of California, Berkeley until his retirement. He made major contributions to the study of colonial land tenure, peasant rebellions, and many aspects of colonial religion in Mexico. In 2007, he received the Distinguished Service Award of the Conference on Latin American History, the highest honor of the professional organization of Latin American historians.

== Academic career ==
Taylor attended Occidental College and earned a B.A. in Latin American Studies in 1965. He attended Universidad de las Américas 1964–65, earning an M.A. in History. He studied at University of Michigan for his doctorate under the direction of distinguished Latin American historian Charles Gibson. Taylor co-edited a festschrift for his mentor.

His 1969 doctoral dissertation was revised and published as Landlord and Peasant in Colonial Mexico, which challenged a number of important aspects of research on colonial Mexican haciendas. Taylor showed that there were considerable regional variations in colonial Mexican land tenure patterns. Using the case study of Oaxaca, he demonstrated that indigenous communities continued to control land and the Catholic Church was not dominant in the agrarian sector. Taylor's work was one many regional hacienda studies that followed, and one that Eric Van Young singles out in a review article. “Not all regions experienced the same degree of land concentration, of course, as Taylor's 1972 work on Oaxaca has notably shown.”

His second major monograph was Drinking, Homicide, and Rebellion in Colonial Mexican Villages, which showed that reports of indigenous drinking were likely exaggerated by colonial officials, homicides were usually within communities, and rebellion at the local level followed discernible patterns. Taylor identified local trial records as a new source of Mexican Indian history, which are important since they record Indians’ testimony on topics not generally found in other colonial sources. One reviewer of this book says that it stands “as evidence of the continued independence of thought of an historian who now ranks among the foremost in his specialty.”

His magisterial study of the secular clergy, Magistrates of the Sacred: Priests and Parishioners in Eighteenth-Century Mexico won the Conference on Latin American History Bolton/Johnson Award for the best book in English on Latin American history in 1997. The work is complicates the understanding of the colonial Catholic Church, and makes "a major contribution to the ongoing debate over the significance of the Bourbon reforms...Taylor's monumental work is essential reading for every colonialist and an indispensable foundation for future studies of the church in colonial Latin America." Historian Nancy Farriss says of it, "Taylor's book will stand for a long time as the work that everyone in the field must consult, refer to, and reckon with."

== Honors and recognition ==
- 2018. Latin American Studies Association, Howard F. Cline Prize in Mexican History for Theater of a Thousand Wonders: A History of Miraculous Images and Shrines in New Spain (Cambridge University Press, 2016)
- 2017. American Catholic Historical Association, John Gilmary Shea Prize for Theater of a Thousand Wonders: A History of Miraculous Images and Shrines in New Spain
- 1998-2005. Muriel McKevitt Sonne Professor of History, University of California, Berkeley
- 1993-1998 Edmund and Louise Kahn Professor of History and Adjunct Professor of Anthropology, Southern Methodist University
- 1992-1993 Commonwealth Professor of History, University of Virginia
- 2007 Distinguished Service Award, Conference on Latin American History, its highest honor.
- 1997 Winner, Herbert E. Bolton/John J. Johnson Award, Conference on Latin American History for the best book on Latin American History in English for Magistrates of the Sacred.
- 1988 Conference on Latin American History Prize (renamed the Paul Vanderwood Prize) for best article on Latin American history for “The Virgin of Guadalupe in New Spain: An Inquiry into the Social History of Marian Devotion,” American Ethnologist 14:1 (February 1987).".
- 1980 Honorable Mention, Herbert E. Bolton/John J. Johnson Award, Conference on Latin American History for the best book on Latin American History in English for Drinking, Homicide, and Rebellion in Colonial Mexican Villages.
- 1973 Honorable Mention, Herbert E. Bolton/John J. Johnson Award, Conference on Latin American History for the best book on Latin American history in English for Landlord and Peasant in Colonial Oaxaca.

== Publications ==
=== Monographs ===
- Fugitive Freedom: The Improbable Lives of Two Imposters in Late Colonial Mexico. Oakland CA: University of California Press 2021. ISBN 9780520368569
- Theater of a Thousand Wonders: A History of Miraculous Images and Shrines in New Spain (Cambridge University Press, 2016)
- Magistrates of the Sacred: Priests and Parishioners in Eighteenth-Century Mexico, Stanford, CA: Stanford University Press, 1996. Spanish edition, joint publication of El Colegio de Michoacán and El Colegio de México, 1999.
- Drinking, Homicide, and Rebellion in Colonial Mexican Villages, Stanford, CA: Stanford University Press, 1979. Spanish edition, Fondo de Cultura Económica, Mexico, 1987.
- Landlord and Peasant in Colonial Oaxaca, Stanford, CA: Stanford University Press, 1972. Spanish edition, Instituto Oaxaqueño de las Culturas, Oaxaca, 1998.

=== Edited volumes ===
- Colonial Latin America: A Documentary History, with Kenneth Mills and Sandra Lauderdale-Graham, Wilmington, DE: Scholarly Resources Publishers, 2002.
- Oxford Encyclopedia of Mesoamerican Cultures, associate editor, 3 vols., New York: Oxford University Press, 2001.
- Colonial Spanish America: A Documentary History, with Kenneth Mills, Wilmington, DE: Scholarly Resources Publishers, 1998.
- Violence and Resistance in the Americas: Native Americans and the Legacy of Conquest, co-edited with Franklin Pease G.Y., Washington, D.C.: Smithsonian Institution Press, 1994.
- Iberian Colonies, New World Societies: Essays in Memory of Charles Gibson, co-edited with Richard L. Garner, State College, PA, 1985, 1986.

=== Selected articles ===
- "Between Nativitas and Mexico City: An Eighteenth-Century Pastor's Local Religion," Martin Nesvig, ed., Local Religion in Colonial Mexico, Albuquerque, NM: University of New Mexico Press, 2006, pp. 91–117.
- "Two Shrines of the Cristo Renovado: Religion and Peasant Politics in Late Colonial Mexico," The American Historical Review 110:4 (October 2005), 945–974.
- "Our Lady in the Kernel of Corn, 1774," The Americas 59:4 (April 2003), 559–570.
- "Mexico's Virgin of Guadalupe in the Seventeenth Century: Hagiography and Beyond," in Allan Greer and Jodi Bilinkoff, eds., Colonial Saints: Discovering the Holy in the Americas, 1500-1800, New York: Routledge, 2003, pp. 277–298.
- "Cristos de Caña," Oxford Encyclopedia of Mesoamerican Cultures, New York: Oxford University Press, 2001, I: 286–287.
- "Mesoamerican Chronology: The Colonial Period (1521-1821)", Oxford Encyclopedia of Mesoamerican Cultures, New York: Oxford University Press, 2001, II: 257–264.
- “Woodrow Borah …, aquí William Taylor,” Historias 45 (enero-abril 2000), pp. 3–6.
- "Santiago's Horse: Christianity and Colonial Indian Resistance in the Heartland of New Spain," in William B. Taylor and Franklin Pease G.Y., eds., Violence and Resistance in the Americas: Native Americans and the Legacy of Conquest, Washington, D.C.: Smithsonian Institution Press, 1993, pp. 153–189.
- "Banditry and Insurrection: Rural Unrest in Central Jalisco, 1790-1816," in Friedrich Katz, ed., Riot, Rebellion, and Revolution in Mexican History, Princeton, N.J.: Princeton University Press, 1988,
- "The Virgin of Guadalupe in New Spain: An Inquiry into the Social History of Marian Devotion,” American Ethnologist 14: 1 (February 1987): 9-33. Spanish version published in Trace, no. 22 (Dec. 1992): 72–85.
- "Indian Pueblos of Central Jalisco on the Eve of Independence," in Richard L. Garner and William B. Taylor, eds., Iberian Colonies, New World Societies: Essays in Memory of Charles Gibson, State College, PA 1986, pp. 161–183.
- "Between Global Process and Local Knowledge: An Inquiry into the Social History of Early Latin America, 1500-1900," in Olivier Zunz, ed., Reliving the Past: The Worlds of Social History, Chapel Hill: University of North Carolina Press, 1985, pp. 115–190.
- "Cofradías and Cargos: An Historical Perspective on the Mesoamerican Civil-Religious Hierarchy," American Ethnologist 12:1 (February 1985): 1-26. (Co-authored with John K. Chance)
- "Estate and Class in a Colonial City: Oaxaca in 1792," Comparative Studies in Society and History, vol. 19 (1977): 454–487. (co-authored with John K. Chance)
- "Colonial Mexico: New Views from the Top," Latin American Research Review 12 (1977): 216–221.
- "Revolution and Tradition in Rural Mexico," Peasant Studies, 5 (1976): 31–37.
- "Town and Country in the Valley of Oaxaca, 1750-1812," in Provinces of Early Mexico: Variants of Spanish American Regional Evolution, Ida Altman and James Lockhart, eds., Los Angeles: University of California Press-UCLA Latin American Center, 1976, pp. 63–95.
- "Land and Water Rights in the Viceroyalty of New Spain," New Mexico Historical Review, 50 (1975): 189–212.
- "Landed Society in New Spain: A View from the South," Hispanic American Historical Review, 54 (1974):387-413.
- "Haciendas coloniales en el valle de Oaxaca," Historia Mexicana, 23 (1973): 284–329.
- "Cacicazgos coloniales en el valle de Oaxaca," Historia Mexicana, 20 (1970): 1-40
- "The Foundation of Nuestra Señora de Guadalupe de los Morenos de Amapa," The Americas, 26 (1970):439-446.
