= Oxford Handbook of Latin American History =

Reference work

The Oxford Handbook of Latin American History is a reference work, primarily of historiography, with narrative discussions of publications on particular topics with select bibliography.

Essays analyze the recent historiography, periodization, themes and trends in the field. Essays are by region and theme. The articles include treatment of both Spanish America and Brazil. They include: “Historiography of New Spain” Kevin Terraciano and Lisa Sousa; “Colonial Spanish South America”, Lyman L. Johnson and Susan M. Socolow; “The Historiography of Early Modern Brazil”, Stuart B. Schwartz; “Sexuality in Colonial Spanish America”, Asunción Lavrin; “Independence in Latin America,” Jeremy Adelman; “Slavery in Brazil,” João Reis and Herbert S. Klein; “Slavery in Brazil,” Barbara Weinstein; “Race in Post-abolition Afro-Latin America,” Kim D. Butler and Aline Helg; “Indigenous Peoples and Nation-States in Spanish America, 1780-2000,” Florencia Mallon; “Rural History,” Eric Van Young, “Latin American Labor History,” James P. Brennan; “Gender and Sexuality in Latin America,” Donna J. Guy; “The Historiography of Latin American Families,” Nara Milanich; “The New Economic History of Latin America: Evolution and Recent Contributions,” John H. Coatsworth and William R. Summerhill; “Disease, Medicine, and Health,” Diego Armus and Adrián López Denis; and “Popular Religion in Latin American Histoririography,” Reinaldo L. Román and Pamela Voekel.

The work has been favorably reviewed in a number of scholarly journals.
