= François Chevalier (historian) =

French historian

- Born: 27 May 1914; Montluçon, France
- Died: 6 June 2012 (aged 98); Paris, France
- Scientific career
- Fields: Historian

François Chevalier (27 May 1914 – 6 May 2012) was a distinguished French historian of Latin America. His most well-known publication is La formation des grands domaines au Mexique (Paris 1952). Translated to Spanish (1956) and English (1963), it is a classic and pioneering work on agrarian history in colonial Mexico, a point of departure for later studies of Mexican haciendas sparking a discussion on whether they were fundamentally feudal or capitalist.

== Education and career ==
Son of philosopher Jacques Chevalier, Chevalier was a student of geography at the University of Grenoble (1933–36) and alumnus of the École des chartes (1936–40). He became a doctoral student of French historian Marc Bloch and developed interests in accord with the Annales School. During World War II, Chevalier was resident in Madrid at the Casa de Velázquez, with the aid of anthropologist Paul Rivet. In Spain, Chevalier began pursuing his interest in the agrarian history of Mexico using the Archivo General de Indias in Seville. Between 1946 and 1949 he was a fellow of the Instituto Francés de América Latina in Mexico City. During this period he developed his theory concerning the formation of the great landed estates (haciendas) in Mexico. This subject was developed in his doctoral dissertation, directed by Marc Bloch, which he completed in 1949. It was revised for publication in French by the Institut d'ethnologie in Paris (1952).

Its publication was a major contribution to colonial Mexican history, but with some lacunae. It was translated to Spanish and published in Mexico in 1956. It was edited and translated to English by Alvin Eustin, with an introduction by Lesley Byrd Simpson and published in 1963 as Land and Society in Colonial Mexico: The Great Hacienda. One reviewer faults this English edition for its many omissions of the original French text and that the English translation is not faithful to the French original. Eric Van Young took Chevalier's work as a point of departure for a lengthy discussion of hacienda studies in Mexico.

Chevalier spent considerable time in Mexico. He had contacts with Mexican historians including José Miranda, Ernesto de la Torre Villar, Luis Chávez Orozco, and Wigberto Jiménez Moreno as well as intellectuals visiting Mexico, including Woodrow Borah, Marcel Bataillon, Rolando Mellafe, and Claude Dumas. While in Mexico, Chevalier worked in the Archivo general de la Nación and in regional archives in Guadalajara, Zacatecas, Monterrey, and Puebla. He and his wife Josèphe Chevalier frequently hosted meals and parties for friends and visitors. In a festschrift for Chevalier, an article is devoted to this aspect of his personal life.

He traveled extensively in Mexico, with some journeys on a Harley Davidson motorcycle that he rode in a suit and tie. He visited the isthmus of Tehuantepec, coast of Michoacan, and the highlands of Jalisco, as well as Veracruz, Puebla, Nayarit, and Aguascalientes. During his travels and researches, he accumulated a huge personal archive of photos and notes, which became the basis for his book Viajes y Pasiones.

He returned to France in 1962, where at the time there was little interest in Latin America. With the help of Hispanist Noel Salomon, the Spanish literature department at the University of Bordeaux hired Chevalier. He taught courses on Mexico from the prehispanic period to the Mexican Revolution, especially emphasizing issues of land tenure. Between 1962 and 1966, he directed the Institut français des Études andines, traveling to the Andean countries frequently and he collected material for his personal archive-library. In 1969 he had a position at the University of Paris 1, Pantheon-Sorbonne, where he remained until his retirement in 1983.

He had accumulated a huge personal library and archive of materials from Mexico and the Andes, which he donated in his 90s to the Centre de recherches d'histoire de l'Amérique latine et du Monde ibérique (CRALMI) de la Université de Paris I (Panthéon- Sorbonne). A published inventory of the archival materials, photos, and documents appears in the 2005 festschrift.

He died in Paris on 6 June 2012.

== Impact of Chevalier's work ==
Chevalier's publication on the development of the great landed estate in colonial Mexico grew out of his doctoral dissertation under the direction of Marc Bloch. When it was published, it was recognized as a major contribution to Mexican history. Relatively few works in French at the time were translated to Spanish or English, but Chevalier's merited having a wide scholarly readership and was translated into both.

Chevalier's publication built on earlier work by Mexican historians, such as Silvio Zavala, Jesús Silva Herzog, and others, but his book applied the model of the medieval landed estates in France, "emphasizing the politico-institutional dimension highlighted by his own teacher, Marc Bloch." Chevalier viewed the landed estate's development by elites was as much as anything a "psychological" impetus, to show one's status whether or not the estate was profitable.

In 1983, Van Young wrote a major historiographical article taking Chevalier's work as the point of departure, saying that "Thirty years ago, François Chevalier told us everything we had always wanted to hear about "men rich and powerful" and the classical Mexican hacienda... Chevalier, with his painstaking approach to masses of previously unexploited documentation, who brought the great hacienda down from the level of abstraction to that of historical reality."

Chevalier's book set in motion scholarly activity investigating the hacienda in Mexico. Historian Charles Gibson in his magnum opus The Aztecs Under Spanish Rule (1964), called for more research to test Chevalier's hypothesis that the hacienda was a basically feudal enterprise using debt peonage labor. Gibson's doctoral student William B. Taylor examined colonial Oaxaca land tenure patterns and showed that indigenous communities held significant amounts of land, a counter-example to patterns of the Catholic church and colonial elites' accumulation of land.

== Honors and recognition ==
- Corresponding member of the Spanish Real Academia de la Historia
- Corresponding member of the Academia Mexicana de la Historia
- Awarded the "Medalla 1808" by the Government of Mexico City
- Exhibition in his honor, 2012 Mexican Instituto Nacional de Antropologia e Historia of a selection of his photos taken during his travels in Mexico.
- Colloquium in his honor 2007 "The schools of historiography of France and Mexico: circulation, reception, and debates: Homage to François Chevalier. " at the Instituto Francés de América Latina (IFAL)
- Colloquium in his honor, 1990, Universidad de Guadalajara "Las Formas y las políticas del dominio agrario: homenaje a François Chevalier", 1990. "Memorias" from the colloquium were published in 1992.

== Publications ==
- La formation des grands domaines au Mexique (terre et société aux XVIe et XVIIe siècles), Paris, Institut d'ethnologie, Paris, 1952. New expanded edition in French, Karthala, 2006.
- Formación de los latifundios en México : tierra y sociedad en los Siglos XVI y XVII, trad. de Antonio Alatorre, México : Fondo de Cultura Económica, 1976. (2a. ed., con nueva introducción del autor, 1976; 3a.ed., 1999). Chevalier updated the introduction and bibliography for the 1999 edition.
- Land and Society in Colonial Mexico: The Great Hacienda, edited and translated by Alvis Eustin, prologue by Lesley Byrd Simpson, University of California Press, 1963.
- L'Amérique latine de l'Indépendance à nos jours, Paris, PUF- Nouvelle Clio, 1977. (2a.ed., 1993).
- América Latina : de la Independencia a nuestros días, México : Fondo de Cultura Económica, 1999,
- (with Javier Perez Siller), Viajes y pasiones. Imágenes y recuerdos del México rural, México: IFAL - CEMCA - Fondo de Cultura Económica, México : Instituto francés de América Latina, 1998.
