= Ursula Lamb =

American historian of Latin American history (1914–1996)

Ursula Schäfer Lamb
- Born: 15 January 1914; Essen, Germany
- Died: 8 August 1996 (aged 82); Tucson, Arizona, US
- Education: Humboldt University of Berlin; Smith College; University of California, Berkeley
- Occupations: Historian, Professor

Ursula Schäfer Lamb (January 15, 1914 – August 8, 1996) was an American historian specializing in Latin American history who published works on the age of exploration and the history of science. She was a pioneering female academic in Latin American history.

== Life and academic career ==
Lamb was born 15 January 1914, in Essen, Germany. She attended the University of Berlin (1933–1935), during Hitler's early years in power, studying History of Art. While a student, Lamb helped Jewish families to escape from Nazi Germany. She was openly anti-Nazi, and was arrested protesting a Nazi official's speech. In 1935, she was able to come to the U.S. with aid from Quakers as an exchange student at Smith College. Lamb entered the graduate program at University of California, Berkeley, studying with Herbert E. Bolton. She earned her M.A. in 1937 and Ph.D. in 1949. The topic of her master's thesis was "Americanization of the Forty-Eighters, 1848-1860," and her doctoral dissertation topic was "Nicolás de Ovando, comendador mayor of Alcántara and governor of the Indies."

Due to prejudices against women in the era, Lamb was "prevented from pursuing her first choices in an academic career", and her difficulties in the U.S. were compounded by her being designated an "enemy alien." Despite her 1939 marriage to a U.S. citizen, distinguished physicist Willis Lamb, who later won a Nobel prize, Lamb could not live within 50 miles of the coast. She completed her dissertation on Nicolás de Ovando in 1949.

Lamb taught at Barnard College (1943–1951), Brasenose College, Oxford University (1959–60), Yale University (1961–1974), and the University of Arizona (1974–1984), where she retired in 1984. It was not until she was at the University of Arizona that she held a tenured professorial position.

In 1990, she was recognized by the Conference on Latin American History Distinguished Service Award, its highest honor. She was the first woman to ever receive it. The Hispanic American Historical Review took the unusual action of publishing two obituaries of her in the year following her death, with the editor noting that the journal "is pleased to offer its readers another look into the life of a pioneer among women in the field of Latin American history."

Lamb died of cancer in 1996, survived by her husband of 57 years. An obituary notes that she did not consider herself a feminist, but "she recognized the need for female scholars to be treated as equals." In her personal life she made a commitment "as a supportive wife to nurture another’s genius."

== Works ==
- Frey Nicolás de Ovando, Gobernador de las Indias 1501–1509 (1956)
- Science by Litigation: A Cosmographer's Feud (1969)
- The Quarti Partita en Cosmographia by Alonso de Cháves: An Interpretation (1969)
- Martín Fernández de Navarrete clears the deck: The Spanish Hydrographic Office 1802–24 (1980)
- Cosmographies and Pilots of the Spanish Maritime Empire (1995)
- The Globe Encircled and the World Revealed, editor (1995), which includes contributions by Charles R. Boxer, Charles Gibson, Samuel Eliot Morison, J.H. Parry, J.H. Elliott, Woodrow Borah, Murdo J. MacLeod, A.J.R. Russell-Wood, Wilcomb E. Washburn

== Honors ==
- Guggenheim Fellowship 1968–69
- National Endowment for the Humanities, Senior Fellowship 1972–73
- President, Society for the History of Discoveries 1975–77
- Grant, National Science Foundation (1978–79)
- Jeannette Black Fellow, John Carter Brown Library 1985
- Distinguished Service Award, Conference on Latin American History 1990
