= Conference on Latin American History =

American professional organization

Conference on Latin American History, (CLAH), founded in 1926, is the professional organization of Latin American historians affiliated with the American Historical Association. It publishes the journal The Hispanic American Historical Review.

== History ==
In 1916, a group of Latin American historians within the American Historical Association met to create institutional structures for this branch of history. Latin Americanists were marginalized within the AHA, with few sessions at the annual meeting and limited space within The American Historical Review. This group founded The Hispanic American Historical Review at the Cincinnati meeting of the AHA.

In 1926, at the American Historical Association annual meeting in Rochester, New York, Latin Americanists sought to expand the teaching of Latin American history and organized a session entitled "Means and Methods of Widening among Colleges and Universities an Interest in the Study of Hispanic-American History". The 1926 meeting led further work to create an identifiable group within the American Historical Association. The constitution of the Conference on Latin American History was adopted in December 1938. CLAH gained a firmer institutional grounding with its incorporation in the District of Columbia in 1964, giving it a legal identity, and locating its offices in the Hispanic Foundation (now Hispanic Division) in the Library of Congress. With that step, CLAH was no longer an organic part of the AHA, but "an affiliated but autonomous body."

In 1964, the AHA was granted $125,000 by the Ford Foundation to aid over three years the expansion of CLAH's activities. The AHA received the funds that were disbursed to CLAH. All funding was for programmatic purposes and not for the support of individuals’ research. The projects identified for funding were to provide a bibliographical guide to nineteenth- and twentieth-century newspapers; develop policies for the collection of historical statistics for the field; discuss and plan for a multivolume history of Latin America; develop teaching aids for the field; fund for small conferences; earmark funds for preparation of colonial sources for publication; and develop a publication series of general works. The Hispanic Foundation at the Library of Congress was named the repository of the CLAH archives and provided services for the CLAH Secretariat.

Women have participated in CLAH leadership since its early years, with four serving as Secretary Treasurer: Lillian Estelle Fisher (1928) and 1935–39; Mary W. Williams (1929–1934); Vera B. Holmes (1940–1943); and Ruth L. Butler (1944–1948). The first woman president of CLAH was Madaline Nicols in 1949, with a gap of 38 years until Peggy Liss was elected in 1987. The first woman recipient of the Bolton (now Bolton-Johnson) Prize for the best book in English was in 1977, with Doris M. Ladd, for The Mexican Nobility at Independence, 1780-1826 (University of Texas Press). The first woman to receive the Distinguished Service Award was Ursula Lamb in 1990. The first woman to be executive director of CLAH was Donna J. Guy in 1991–92. The first CLAH president originally from Latin America is Asunción Lavrin, 2001–02.

== Organizational structure ==
The organization is governed by the Executive Committee and General Council. There is an executive committee: president (formerly chair), vice president, past president, and the executive director. Serving on the General Council are three elected members and ex officio representatives which include the editor of Hispanic American Historical Review, the editor of "The Americas" and the editor of H-Latam. As CLAH grew in membership and complexity of its fields, it established a series of sections with regional or other focus including Andean Studies, Atlantic World studies; Borderlands/Frontiers Studies; Brazilian Studies; Caribbean Studies; Central American Studies; Chile-Rio de la Plata Studies; Colonial studies; Gran Colombian studies; Mexican studies; and the committee on Teaching and Teaching Materials.

== Prizes ==
Starting in 1953, CLAH established a series of prizes, the first being the James A. Robertson Prize for the best article published in the Hispanic American Historical Review, followed by others for particular fields. Prizes now include the Distinguished Service Award, the highest honor of the organization; the Herbert E. Bolton-John J. Johnson Prize for the best book in English on Latin American history; the Lewis Hanke Award to enable revision of a dissertation into a publishable book; the James R. Scobie Awards to support travel for dissertation research; the Lydia Cabrera Award, for Cuban history up to 1898; the Howard F. Cline Memorial Prize for the best book on Latin American ethnohistory; the Warren Dean Award for Brazilian history; the Elinor Melville Award for the best book in environmental history; the María Elena Martínez Prize for the best work on Mexican history; Paul Vanderwood Award for the best article published in a journal other than Hispanic American Historical Review; the Antonine Tibesar Award for the best article published in The Americas.

== Chairs and presidents ==
- 2023–2024 Celso Thomas Castilho
- 2021-2022 Ben Vinson III
- 2019–2020 Bianca Premo
- 2017–2018 Lara Putnam
- 2015–2016 Jerry Dávila
- 2013–2014 Jane Landers
- 2011–2012 Cynthia Radding
- 2009–2010 Mary Kay Vaughan
- 2007–2008 Jeffrey Lesser
- 2005–2006 Mark Wasserman
- 2003–2004 Ann Twinam
- 2001–2002 Asunción Lavrin
- 1999–2000 Susan Socolow
- 1997–1998 Lyman L. Johnson
- 1995–1996 Donna J. Guy
- 1994 Florencia Mallon
- 1992 Eric Van Young
- 1991 E. Bradford Burns
- 1990 Murdo J. MacLeod
- 1989 Ralph Lee Woodward
- 1988 John V. Lombardi
- 1987 Peggy K. Liss

Chairpersons

- 1986 Michael C. Meyer
- 1985 Robert A. Potash
- 1984 Richard Graham
- 1983 Stuart B. Schwartz
- 1982 Herbert S. Klein
- 1981 John J. TePaske
- 1980 Dauril Alden
- 1979 Charles A. Hale
- 1978 James R. Scobie
- 1977 Richard Greenleaf
- 1976 Stanley J. Stein
- 1975 David Bushnell
- 1974 Benjamin Keen
- 1973 John Leddy Phelan
- 1972 Lyle McAlister
- 1971 William J. Griffith
- 1970 Thomas McGann
- 1969 Richard M. Morse
- 1968 Stanley R. Ross
- 1967 Woodrow Borah
- 1966 Harry Bernstein
- 1965 Robert N. Burr
- 1964 Howard F. Cline
- 1963 Charles Gibson
- 1962 James F. King
- 1961 John J. Johnson
- 1960 Irving A. Leonard
- 1959 Charles C. Griffin
- 1958 John Tate Lanning
- 1957 Walter V. Scholes
- 1956 Engel Sluiter
- 1955 John Francis Bannon
- 1954 Bailey W. Diffie
- 1953 Alexander Marchant
- 1952 John Tate Lanning
- 1951 Charles E. Nowell
- 1950 George P. Hammond
- 1949 Madaline Nichols
- 1948 Lewis Hanke
- 1947 Philip W. Powell
- 1946 A. Curtis Wilgus
- 1945 A. Curtis Wilgus
- 1944 Samuel F. Beamis
- 1943 Arthur P. Whitaker
- 1942 Arthur P. Whitaker
- 1941 Isaac J. Cox
- 1940 Dana G. Munro
- 1939 James A. Robertson
- (deceased, J. Fred Rippy pro tem)
- 1938 J. Fred Rippy
- 1937 Arthur P. Whitaker
- 1936 Joseph B. Lockey
- 1935 Alfred Hasbrouck
- 1934 Percy A. Martin
- 1933 Arthur S. Aiton
- 1932 Clarence H. Haring
- 1931 William S. Robertson
- 1930 Clarence H. Haring
- 1929 J. Fred Rippy
- 1928 Isaac J. Cox
- 1927 Milledge L. Bonham, Jr.

== Distinguished Service Award ==
- 2017 Eric Van Young, University of California, San Diego
- 2016 Mary Kay Vaughan, University of Maryland
- 2015 Herbert S. Klein, Stanford University
- 2014 Lyman L. Johnson, The University of North Carolina at Charlotte
- 2013 Valerie Millholland, Senior Editor with Duke University Press
- 2012 Susan Socolow, Emory University
- 2011 Paul Vanderwood, San Diego State University
- 2010 Richard Graham, University of Texas at Austin
- 2009 Friedrich Katz, University of Chicago
- 2008 Asunción Lavrin, Arizona State University
- 2007 William B. Taylor, University of California, Berkeley
- 2006 Georgette Dorn, Library of Congress
- 2005 Charles A. Hale, University of Iowa
- 2004 James Lockhart, UCLA
- 2003 Thomas Skidmore, Brown University
- 2002 Ralph Lee Woodward, Texas Christian University
- 2001 Michael C. Meyer, University of Arizona
- 2000 Emilia Viotti da Costa, Yale University
- 1999 Dauril Alden, University of Washington
- 1998 Richard Greenleaf, Tulane University
- 1997 John Lynch, University of London.
- 1996 David Bushnell, University of Florida
- 1995 John Jay TePaske, Duke University
- 1994 Tulio Halperin-Donghi, University of California, Berkeley
- 1993 E. Bradford Burns, University of California, Los Angeles
- 1992 Magnus Mörner
- 1991 Stanley J. Stein, Princeton University
- 1990 Ursula Lamb, University of Arizona
- 1989 William J. Griffith, University of Kansas
- 1987 Co-Awards: John J. Johnson, Stanford University
- 1987 Charles R. Boxer, Yale University
- 1985 Benjamin Keen, Northern Illinois University
- 1983 Irving A. Leonard, University of Michigan
- 1981 Charles Gibson, University of Michigan
- 1979 Woodrow Borah, University of California at Berkeley
- 1977 Arthur P. Whitaker, University of Pennsylvania
- 1975 Nettie Lee Benson, University of Texas at Austin
- 1973 Lewis Hanke, University of Massachusetts
- 1971 Howard F. Cline, Library of Congress
- 1970 Charles Griffin, Vassar College

== Herbert Eugene Bolton-John J. Johnson Prize – Best Book in English ==
- 2022 Diana Montaño, Electrifying Mexico: Technology and the Transformation of a Modern City (University of Texas Press, 2021)
- 2021 Sylvia Sellers-García, The Woman on the Windowsill: A Tale of Mystery in Several Parts (Yale University Press 2020).
- 2020 Natalia Milanesio, Destape! Sex Democracy, & Freedom in Postdictatorial Argentina (University of Pittsburgh Press 2019). Honorable Mention: Ryan Crewe, The Mexican Mission Native Survival and Mendicant Enterprise in New Spain, 1521-1600 (Cambridge University Press 2019).
- 2019 Maria Cristina Soriano Gómez, Tides of Revolution: Information, Insurgencies, and the Crisis of Colonial Rule in Venezuela (University of New Mexico Press). Honorable Mention: Jesse Cromwell, The Smugglers’ World: Illicit Trade and Atlantic Communities in Eighteenth-Century Venezuela (University of North Carolina Press)
- 2018 Peter Guardino, The Dead March: A History of the Mexican-American War (Harvard University Press, 2017). Honorable Mention: Pablo Gomez, The Experiential Caribbean: Creating Knowledge and Healing in the Early Modern Atlantic (University of North Carolina Chapel Hill, 2017).
- 2017 Celso Thomas Castilho, Slave Emancipation and Transformations in Brazilian Political Citizenship University of Pittsburgh Press, 2016. Honorable Mention: Marcela Echeverri, Indian and Slave Royalists in the Age of Revolution. (Cambridge University Press, 2016).
- 2016 Ann Twinam, Purchasing Whiteness: Pardos, Mulattos, and the Quest for Social Mobility in the Spanish Indies (Stanford University Press, 2015). Honorable Mention: Christopher Boyer, Political Landscapes: Forests, Conservation, and Community in Mexico (Duke University Press, 2015).
- 2015 Thomas Klubock, La Frontera: Forests and Ecological Conflict in Chile’s Frontier Territory (Duke University Press, 2014). Honorable Mention: Sebastián Carassai, The Argentine Silent Majority: Middle Classes, Politics, Violence, and Memory in the Seventies (Duke University Press, 2014).
- 2014 Robert W. Patch, Indians and the Political Economy of Colonial Central America, 1670–1810, (Oklahoma, 2013). Honorable Mention: Seth Garfield, In Search of the Amazon: Brazil, the United States, and the Nature of a Region, (Durham, Duke University Press, 2013).
- 2013 Rebecca Earle, The Body of the Conquistador. Food, Race, and the Colonial Experience in South America, 1492–1700, (Cambridge, 2013). Honorable Mention: Mauricio Tenorio-Trillo, I Speak of the City. Mexico City at the Turn of the Twentieth Century, (Chicago, 2012).
- 2012 John Tutino, Founding Capitalism in the Bajío and Spanish North America, (Duke, 2011).
- 2011 Richard Graham, Feeding the City: From Street Market to Liberal Reform in Salvador, Brazil, (Texas, 2010). Honorable Mention: Jane Landers, Atlantic Creoles in the Age of Revolutions, (Harvard, 2010).
- 2010 Robin Derby, The Dictator’s Seduction: Politics and the Popular Imagination in the Era of Trujillo, (Duke, 2009).
- 2009 Stuart B. Schwartz, All Can Be Saved: Religious Tolerance and Salvation in the Iberian Atlantic World (Yale, 2008).
- 2008 Cynthia E. Milton, The Many Meanings of Poverty: Colonialism, Social Compacts and Assistance in Eighteenth Century Ecuador (Stanford University Press). Honorable Mention: Rebecca Earle, The Return of the Native: Indians and Myth-making in Spanish America, 1810–1930 (Duke University Press).
- 2007 Steve J. Stern, Battling for Hearts and Minds: Memory Struggles in Pinochet’s Chile, 1973–1988 (Duke University Press).
- 2006 Florencia Mallon, Courage Tastes of Blood: The Mapuche Community of Nicholás Ailío and the Chilean State, 1906–2001 (Duke University Press). Honorable Mention: Susan E. Ramírez, To Feed and be Fed: The Cosmological Bases of Authority and Identity in the Andes (Stanford University Press).
- 2005 Emilio Kourí,A Pueblo Divided: Business, Property and Community in Papantla, Mexico (Stanford University Press). Honorable Mention: Bryan McCann, Hello, Hello Brazil: Popular Music in the Making of Modern Brazil (Duke University Press).
- 2004 Richard Lee Turits, Foundations of Despotism: Peasants, the Trujillo Regime, and Modernity in Dominican History (Stanford University Press). Honorable Mention: Linda Lewin. Surprise Heirs I: Illegitimacy, Patrimonial Rights, and Legal Nationalism in Luso-Brazilian Inheritance, 1750–1821, and Surprise Heirs II: Illegitimacy, Inheritance Rights, and Public Power in the Formation of Imperial Brazil, 1822–1889 (Stanford University Press).
- 2003 Jean Franco, The Decline and Fall of the Lettered City: Latin America in the Cold War (Harvard University Press). Honorable Mention: John Mason Hart, Empire and Revolution: The Americans in Mexico Since the Civil War (University of California Press).
- 2002 Eric Van Young, The Other Rebellion: Popular Violence, Ideology, and the Mexican Struggle for Independence, 1810–1821 (Stanford University Press). Honorable Mention: Kevin Terraciano, The Mixtecs of Colonial Oaxaca: Ñudzahui History, Sixteenth through Eighteenth Centuries (Stanford University Press).
- 2001 Ann Farnsworth-Alvear, Dulcinea in the Factory: Myths, Morals, Men, and Women in Colombia’s Industrial Experiment, 1905–1960 (Duke University Press).
- 2000 Louis A. Pérez, On Becoming Cuban: Identity, Nationality and Culture (University of North Carolina Press). Honorable Mention: Ann Twinam, Public Lives, Private Secrets: Gender, Honor, Sexuality, and Illegitimacy in Colonial Spanish America (Stanford University Press).
- 1999 (co-winners) Friedrich Katz, The Life and Times of Pancho Villa (Stanford University Press); José C. Moya, Cousins and Strangers: Spanish Immigrants in Buenos Aires, 1850–1930 (University of California Press).
- 1998 Mary Kay Vaughan, Cultural Politics in Revolution Teachers, Peasants, and Schools in Mexico, 1930–1940 (University of Arizona Press). Honorable Mention: Rosalie Schwartz, Pleasure Island: Tourism and Temptation in Cuba (University of Nebraska Press).
- 1997 William B. Taylor, Magistrates of the Sacred, Priest and Parishioners in Eighteenth Century Mexico (Stanford University Press). Honorable Mentions: Thomas F. O Brien, The Revolutionary Mission: American Enterprises in Latin America, 1900–1940 (Cambridge University Press. Susan E. Ramirez, The World Upside Down: Cross-Cultural Contact and Conflict in Sixteenth Century Peru (Stanford University Press).
- 1996 Warren Dean, posthumous, With Broad Axe and Firebrand: the Destruction of the Brazilian Atlantic Forest, (University of California Press).
- 1995 Elinor G. K. Melville, A Plague of Sheep: Environmental Consequences of the Conquest of Mexico (Cambridge University Press). Honorable Mentions: David J. McCreery, Rural Guatemala, 1760–1940 (Stanford University Press). R. Douglas Cope, The Limits of Racial Domination: Plebeian Society in Colonial Mexico City, 1660–1720 (University of Wisconsin Press).
- 1994 Enrique Tandeter, Coercion and Market: Silver Mining in Colonial Potosi, 1692–1826 (University of New Mexico Press). Honorable Mention: Nils Jacobsen, Mirages of Transition: The Peruvian Altiplano, 1780–1930 (University of California Press).
- 1993 James Lockhart, The Nahuas After the Conquest: A Social and Cultural History of the Indians of Central Mexico, Sixteenth through Eighteenth Centuries (Stanford University Press). Honorable Mentions: Susan Deans-Smith, Bureaucrats, Planters, and Workers: The Making of the Tobacco Monopoly in Bourbon Mexico (University of Texas Press). Alida Metcalf, Family and the Frontier in Colonial Brazil: Santana de Parnaiba, 1580–1822 (University of California Press).
- 1992 Ramón Gutiérrez, When Jesus Came The Corn Mothers Went Away: Marriage, Sexuality and Power in New Mexico, 1300–1846 (Stanford University Press). Honorable Mention: Sabine MacCormack, Religion in the Andes: Vision and Imagination in Colonial Peru (Princeton University Press).
- 1991 Ann M. Wightman, Indigenous Migration and Social Change: The Forasteros of Cuzco, 1520–1720 (Duke University Press). Honorable Mention: Hilda Sábato, Agrarian Capitalism and the World Market: Buenos Aires in the Pastoral Stage, 1840–1890 (University of New Mexico Press).
- 1990 (co-winners) Charles A. Hale, The Transformation of Liberalism in Late Nineteenth-Century Mexico (Princeton University Press).Ida Altman, Extremadura and Spanish America in the Sixteenth Century (University of California Press).
- 1989 Patricia Seed, To Love, Honor, and Obey in Colonial Mexico: Conflicts over Marriage Choice, 1574–1821 (Stanford University Press). Honorable Mention: Joseph C. Miller, Way of Death: Merchant Capitalism and the Angolan Slave Trade, 1730–1830 (University of Wisconsin Press).
- 1988 Inga Clendennin, Ambivalent Conquests: Spaniard and Maya in Yucatán, 1517–1570 (Cambridge University Press). Honorable Mention: Linda Lewin, Politics and Parentela in Paraíba: A Case Study of Family Based Oligarchy in Brazil (Princeton University Press).
- 1987 Alan Knight, The Mexican Revolution (Cambridge University Press, 2 vols.). Honorable Mention: Charles W. Bergquist, Labor in Latin America: Comparative Essays on Chile, Argentina, Venezuela, and Colombia (Stanford University Press).
- 1986 Stuart B. Schwartz, Sugar Plantations in the Formation of Brazilian Society: Bahia, 1550–1835 (Cambridge University Press). Honorable Mention: Silvia Marina Arrom, The Women of Mexico City, 1790–1857 (Stanford University Press).
- 1985 Nancy Farriss, Maya Society under Colonial Rule: The Collective Enterprise of Survival (Princeton University Press). Honorable Mention: Karen Spalding, Huarochirí: An Andean Society under Inca and Spanish Rule (Stanford University Press).
- 1984 Woodrow Borah Justice By Insurance: The General Indian Court of Colonial Mexico and the Legal Aides of the Half-Real (University of California Press). Honorable Mention: Florencia Mallon, The Defense of Community in Peru's Central Highlands: Peasant Struggles and Capitalist Transition, 1860–1940 (Princeton University Press).
- 1983 Anthony Pagden, The Fall of Natural Man: the American Indian and the Origins of Comparative Ethnology (Cambridge University Press). Honorable Mentions: Nathaniel Leff, Underdevelopment and Development in Nineteenth-Century Brazil (Allen and Unwin). Steve J. Stern, Peru's Indian Peoples and the Challenge of Spanish Conquest: Huamanga to 1640 (University of Wisconsin Press).
- 1982 Friedrich Katz, The Secret War in Mexico: Europe, the United States and the Mexican Revolution (University of Chicago Press). Honorable Mention: Walter Rodney, A History of the Guyanese Working People, 1881–1905 (Johns Hopkins University Press).
- 1981 Herman W. Konrad, A Jesuit Hacienda in Colonial Mexico. Santa Lucia, 1576–1767 (Stanford University Press). Honorable Mention: George Reid Andrews, The Afro-Argentines of Buenos Aires, 1800–1900 (University of Wisconsin Press).
- 1980 Jonathan C. Brown, A Socioeconomic History of Argentina, 1776–1860 (Cambridge University Press). Honorable Mentions: David Brading, Haciendas and Ranchos in the Mexican Bajio, 1700–1860 (Cambridge University Press). William B. Taylor, Drinking, Homicide, and Rebellion in Colonial Mexican Villages (Stanford University Press).
- 1979 Paul Drake, Socialism and Populism in Chile, 1932–52 (University of Illinois Press). Honorable Mentions: John K. Chance, Race and Class in Colonial Oaxaca (Stanford University Press). Susan M. Socolow, The Merchants of Buenos Aires, 1778–1810 (Cambridge University Press).
- 1978 Christon I. Archer, The Army in Bourbon Mexico, 1760–1810 (University of New Mexico Press). Honorable Mention: John D. Wirth, Minas Gerais in the Brazilian Federation, 1889–1937 (Stanford University Press).
- 1977 Doris M. Ladd, The Mexican Nobility at Independence, 1780–1826 (University of Texas Press). Honorable Mention: Warren Dean, Rio Claro: A Brazilian Plantation System, 1820–1920 (Stanford University Press).
- 1976 David Rock, Politics in Argentina, 1890–1930, the Rise and Fall of Radicalism (Cambridge University Press). Honorable Mentions: Charles H. Harris, III, A Mexican Family Empire: The Latifundio of the Sánchez Navarro Family, 1765-1867 (University of Texas Press). Stanley E. Hilton, Brazil and the Great Powers, 1930-1939 (University of Texas Press).
- 1975 Frederick P. Bowser, The African Slave in Colonial Peru, 1524–1650 (Stanford University Press). Honorable Mentions: James R. Scobie, Buenos Aires: Plaza to Suburb, 1870–1910 (Oxford University Press). Thomas E. Skidmore, Black into White: Race and Nationality in Brazilian Thought (Oxford University Press).
- 1974 Warren L. Cook, Flood Tide of Empire: Spain and the Pacific Northwest, 1543–1819 (Yale University Press). Honorable Mention: Stuart B. Schwartz, Sovereignty and Society in Colonial Brazil: The High Court of Bahia and its Judges, 1609–1751 (University of California Press). Frank D. McCann, Jr., The Brazilian-American Alliance, 1937–1945 (Princeton University Press).
- 1973 Peter J. Bakewell, Silver Mining and Society in Colonial Mexico: Zacatecas, 1546–1700 (Cambridge University Press). Honorable Mention: William B. Taylor, Landlord and Peasant in Colonial Oaxaca (Stanford University Press).
- 1972 David Brading, Miners and Merchants in Bourbon Mexico, 1763–1810 (Cambridge University Press). Honorable Mention: Joseph L. Love, Rio Grande Do Sul and Brazilian Regionalism, 1882–1930 (Stanford University Press).
- 1971 John D. Wirth, The Politics of Brazilian Development, 1930–1954 (Stanford University Press). Honorable Mentions: John Hemming, The Conquest of the Incas (Harcourt, Brace, Jovanovich). J.R. Fisher, Government and Society in Colonial Peru: The Intendant System, 1784–1814 (Athalone Press, University of London).
- 1970 John Womack, Zapata and the Mexican Revolution (Alfred A. Knopf). Honorable Mentions:Cecil Alan Hutchinson, Frontier Settlements in Mexican California: The Hijar Padres Colony and Its Origins, 1769–1835 (Yale University Press). Robert A. Potash, The Army and Politics in Argentina, 1828–1945 (Stanford University Press).
- 1969 (co-winners) A.J.R. Russell-Wood, Fidalgos and Philanthropoists: The Santa Casa de Misericórdia of Bahia, 1550–1755 (University of California Press). Richard Graham, Britain and the Onset of Modernization in Brazil, 1850–1914 (Cambridge University Press). Honorable Mentions: Dauril Alden, Royal Government in Colonial Brazil: With Special Reference to the Administration of the Marquis of Lavradio, Viceroy, 1769–1779 (University of California Press). James Lockhart, Spanish Peru, 1532–1560; A Colonial Society (University of Wisconsin Press).
- 1968 James W. Wilkie, The Mexican Revolution: Federal Expenditure and Social Change since 1910 (University of California Press). Honorable Mentions: Simon Collier, Ideas and Politics of Chilean Independence, 1808 – 1833 (Cambridge University Press). John Leddy Phelan, The Kingdom of Quito in the Seventeenth Century (University of Wisconsin Press).
- 1967 E. Bradford Burns, The Unwritten Alliance: Rio Branco and Brazilian-American Relations (Columbia University Press). Honorable Mentions: John Preston Moore, The Cabildo in Peru under the Bourbons (Duke University Press). Ralph Lee Woodward, Class Privileges and Economic Development: The Consulado de Comercio in Guatemala, 1793–1871 (University of North Carolina Press).
- 1966 Robert N. Burr, By Reason or Force: Chile and the Balancing of Power in South America, 1830–1905 (University of California Press). Honorable Mention: William J. Griffith, Empires in the Wilderness—Foreign Colonization and Development in Guatemala, 1834-1844 (University of North Carolina Press).
- 1965 Charles Gibson, The Aztecs Under Spanish Rule: A History of the Indians of the Valley of Mexico, 1519–1810 (Stanford University Press). Honorable Mention: James R. Scobie, Revolution on the Pampas: A Social History of Argentine Wheat (University of Texas Press).
- 1964 Fredrick B. Pike, Chile and the United States, 1880–1962: the Emergence of Chile's Social Crisis and the Challenge to United States Diplomacy (University of Notre Dame Press).
- 1963 Frank Tannenbaum, Ten Keys to Latin America (Alfred A. Knopf).
- 1962 Bryce Wood, The Making of the Good Neighbor Policy (Columbia University Press).
- 1961 Robert E. Quirk, The Mexican Revolution, 1914–1915 (University of Indiana Press). Honorable Mention: E. David Cronon, Josephus Daniels in Mexico (University of Indiana Press).
- 1960 Irving A. Leonard, Baroque Times in Old Mexico: Seventeenth Century Persons, Places, and Practices (University of Michigan Press).
- 1959 (co-winners) John J. Johnson, Political Change in Latin America: The Emergency of the Middle Sectors (Stanford University Press). Robert J. Schafer, The Economic Societies in the Spanish World, 1763–1821 (Syracuse University Press).
- 1958 Stanley J. Stein, Vassouras: A Brazilian Coffee Country, 1850–1900 (Harvard University Press).
- 1957 John Tate Lanning, The Eighteenth Century Enlightenment in the University of San Carlos de Guatemala (Cornell University Press).
