= Charles A. Hale =

American historian

Charles Adam Hale (June 5, 1930 – September 29, 2008) was a distinguished historian of Mexico, who published major works on nineteenth and early twentieth-century Liberalism in Mexico.

== Life ==
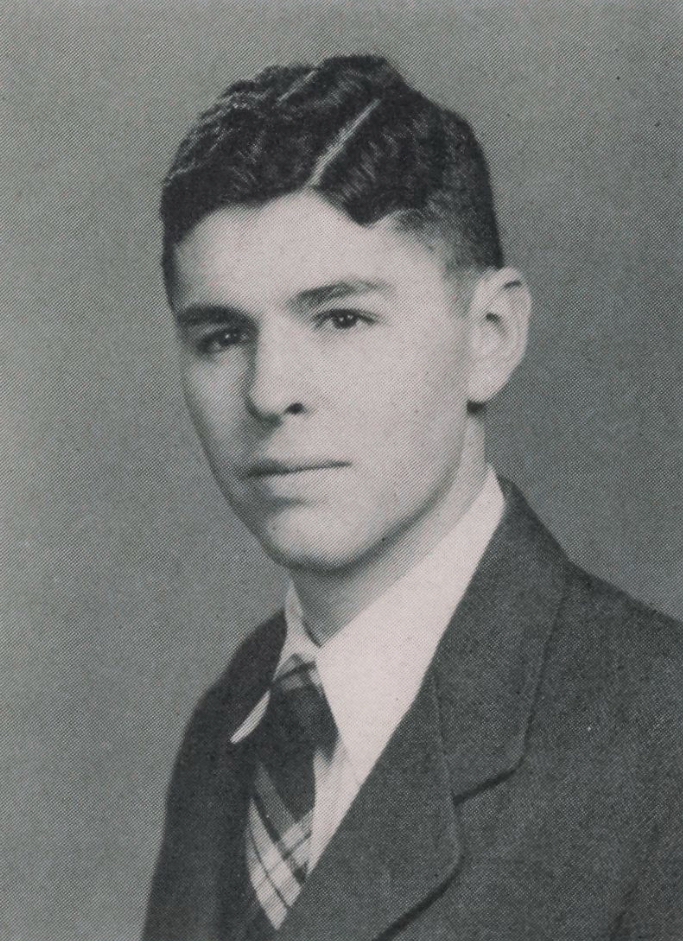
Hale in the 1951 Amherst College yearbook

Hale was born in Minneapolis, Minnesota to Lloyd and Elizabeth Hale. He attended Amherst College, graduating in 1951, and elected to Phi Beta Kappa. In 1957, he earned a doctorate in history at Columbia University, with Frank Tannenbaum as his mentor. He married Lenore Briggs Rice, the daughter of Paul North Rice and Genevieve Briggs Rice. He spent most of his academic career in the History Department of University of Iowa. Following his retirement in 1997, he and his wife moved to Seattle, where he died of congestive heart failure on September 29, 2008. In his obituary of Hale, Eric Van Young wrote that "with the death of Charles Adams Hale, historians of Mexico in this country, in Mexico, and abroad, and the guild of Latin American historians more generally, have lost one of their very best and most recognized practitioners."

== Career ==
Hale's first monograph on Mexican liberalism, Mexican Liberalism in the Age of Mora, on the early nineteenth-century, is now considered a "classic work, indispensable for understanding Mexican political life up to the mid-19th century and beyond." In Mexico it won the Bernardino de Sahagún prize. In 1973, he was awarded a John Simon Guggenheim Foundation fellowship, continuing his work on Mexican liberalism. His second monograph on the topic, The Transformation of Liberalism in Late 19th-Century Mexico, won the 1990 Conference on Latin American History Bolton Prize, for the best book in English on Latin American history. One scholar noted Hale was one of the few historians in the late twentieth century who focused on the history of ideas in Latin America. Hale's last monograph, published just before his death, was Emilio Rabasa and the Survival of Porfirian Liberalism, a political biography and intellectual history.

He was lauded for his academic achievements, "a first-rate scholar", but also "because he was an admirable human being, qualities that do not always go together". Following his death, funds donated to the Latin American Studies Association created the Charles A. Hale Fellowship for Mexican History for doctoral dissertation work by a Mexican citizen.
