= Warren Dean =

Warren Dean may refer to:

- Warren Dean (footballer)
- Warren Dean (historian)

== See also ==
- Warren Dean Flandez, Canadian gospel and rhythm and blues singer
