= Irving Leonard =

Irving Leonard may refer to:

- Irving A. Leonard (1896–1962), historian specialising in Hispanic history and art
- Irving Leonard (financial adviser) (1915–1969), financial adviser to Hollywood film stars of the 1950s and 1960s
