= Maria Elena Martinez =

Historian of colonial Mexico

María Elena Martínez-Lopez (2 December 1966, in Pascuales, Durango, Mexico – 16 November 2014, in Los Angeles CA) was a historian of colonial Mexico. Her landmark book, Genealogical Fictions: Limpieza de Sangre, Religion, and Gender in Colonial Mexico garnered significant academic recognition.

== Life ==
Martínez was born in northern Mexico in 1966 and moved with her family to Chicago in the 1970s. She earned a B.A. at Northwestern University in 1988, and entered the doctoral program in History at University of Chicago, studying with Friedrich Katz. She taught at University of Southern California until her death of adrenal cancer in 2014. While teaching at USC, she inaugurated the Colonial Latin America seminar at the USC-Huntington Library Early Modern Studies Institute. She gave large number of academic presentations, one of which at the Los Angeles County Museum of Art was videotaped in May 2004.

Martínez was lesbian and was the partner of academic Sarah Gualtieri for many years.

== Honors ==
- Southern Historical Association, Latin American and Caribbean Section, article prize, 2004. "The Black Blood of New Spain: Limpieza de Sangre, Racial Violence, and Gendered Power in Early Colonial Mexico," William and Mary Quarterly vol. LXI (July 2004)
- Conference on Latin American History Mexican History Prize for Genealogical Fictions. (2009)
- American Historical Association, James A. Rawley Prize in Atlantic History for Genealogical Fictions. (2009)
- Conference on Latin American History prize in Colonial Latin American History renamed in her honor posthumously. The prize "is awarded annually for the book or article judged to be the most significant work on the history of Mexico published during the previous year."

== External Sources ==
- Guide to the Maria Elena Martinez Papers 1986-2015 at the University of Chicago Special Collections Research Center
