= François Chevalier =

François Chevalier may refer to:

- François Chevalier (cyclist) (1893–1983), a French cyclist
- François Chevalier (historian) (1914–2012), a French historian
- François Chevalier, a pseudonym of the composer Lee Orean Smith (1874–1942)
