= Jeffrey Lesser =

American historian

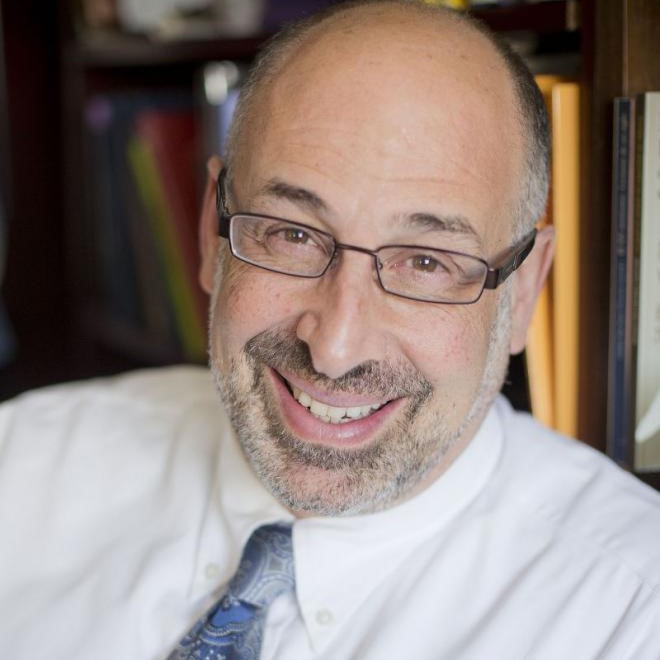

Jeffrey Lesser is a U.S.-based historian of Latin America who is the Samuel Candler Dobbs Professor at Emory University. Prior to that he was the Winship Distinguished Professor of the Humanities. After two terms as the chair of the History Department at Emory University he was named the first faculty director of the Halle Institute for Global Research . He is the author of numerous books on ethnicity, immigration and national identity in Brazil. In 2022 Lesser won Emory University‘s Eleanor Main Graduate Mentor Award and in 2023 he received the Marion V. Creekmore Award for Internationalization .

Lesser studied at Brown University (BA 1982; MA 1984) and then earned a Ph.D. in Latin American history at New York University (1989) where he studied with the late Warren Dean. He was the Fulbright Chair of the Humanities at Tel Aviv University and also has held visiting professorships at the University of São Paulo and the State University of Campinas. In 2007-08, he served as president of the Conference on Latin American History, the professional organization of Latin Americanists affiliated with the American Historical Association. In 2015 Lesser founded the "Lesser Research Collective" and became a Research Scholar at the Institute for Advanced Studies of the University of São Paulo with a project on the historical relationship between health and migration in Brazil. In 2022 Lesser was awarded a Fulbright Research Grant, based at the History, Maps, and Computers Research Center of the Federal University of São Paulo (UNIFESP). Lesser is also member of the Advisory Board of the Maria Sibylla Merian Centre for the Study of Conviviality-Inequality in Latin America (Mecila) .

He is the author of a number of prize-winning monographs in English and Portuguese including,Welcoming the Undesirables: Brazil and the Jewish Question, Negotiating National Identity: Immigrants, Minorities and the Struggle for Ethnicity in Brazil, and A Discontented Diaspora: Japanese-Brazilians and the Meanings of Ethnic Militancy. In 2013 Lesser released Immigration, Ethnicity, and National Identity in Brazil, 1808 to the Present, which was revised and published in Brazil as A invenção da brasilidade: Identidade nacional, etnicidade e políticas de imigração. In 2025 Lesser published Living and Dying in São Paulo: Immigrants, Health, and the Built Environment in Brazil, which was revised and published in Brazil by Editora UNESP as Viver e morrer em São Paulo: Imigração, saúde e infraestrutura urbana (século XIX até o presente). Both the English and Portuguese e-editions are open access via funding from the Andrew Mellon Foundation's TOME initiative .
