= Murdo J. MacLeod =

Scottish historian

Murdo J. MacLeod is a Scottish historian of Latin America, publishing extensively on the history of colonial-era Central America, the Caribbean, and the Atlantic world. His monograph Spanish Central America: A Socioeconomic History is a major contribution to the field.

== Life and career ==
Murdo J. MacLeod is son of Mary and Murdo MacLeod. MacLeod was born on April 22, 1935, in Imtarfa, Malta. He attended the University of Glasgow, earning an M.A. (honours) in 1958. He moved to the U.S., entering the graduate program of the University of Florida and completing his doctorate in 1962 with the dissertation entitled "Bolivia and its Social Literature Before and After the Chaco War: A Study of Social and Literary Revolution." He taught at the University of Pittsburgh, the University of Arizona, and the University of Florida, where since 2005, he has been Graduate Research Professor Emeritus. In his career, he was awarded a number of fellowships, including the Institute for Advanced Study in 1988–89. He has served on the editorial boards of scholarly journals, including The Hispanic American Historical Review, The Americas, Colonial Latin American Review, and as a contributing editor of the Handbook of Latin American Studies. In 1990–91 he was president of the Conference on Latin American History, the professional organization of Latin American historians, affiliated with the American Historical Association.

The Southern Historical Association has established the Murdo J. MacLeod Prize for the best work in Latin American, Caribbean, Borderlands, or Atlantic World History.

== Works ==
His major monograph, Spanish Central America: A Socioeconomic History, 1530–1720 was first published in 1973, a revised edition in 2008, and translated to Spanish in 1980. It treats Central American history in three broad periods, the conquest and early colonial era, 1520–1576, the search for economic diversification, ca. 1576–1635, and the seventeenth-century depression and early recovery ca. 1635–1720. It was well-reviewed by distinguished historian Charles Gibson, who called it "a work of very substantial scholarship, the result of prolonged researches in Central American and Spanish archives … Again and again, MacLeod gives us new insights, fresh interpretations, and the well-digested results of investigations into subjects not examined before … this is a book of scrupulous and unusual honesty, in which nothing is claimed in excess of the evidence, and where the author 'levels' with the reader at every opportunity." Another reviewer states that "the writer has presented the main lineaments of Central American economic history to 1720 so well and so thoroughly that his work is unlikely to be surpassed for many years." In a review of a co-edited volume, Spaniards and Indians in Southeastern Mesoamerica: Essays on the History of Ethnic Relations W. George Lovell notes that MacLeod's "forte has characteristically been that rare ability to give shape and explanation to an accumulated drift of events. MacLeod identifies several profound and enduring processes at work, and sees them operating in such a way as to produce patterns which reflect a marked diversity and regional variation in the nature of the colonial experience. More than any other contributor, MacLeod spells out a course for future research, research which he anticipates (with singular intellectual maturity) will precipitate the "heavy revision, if not demolition" (p. 190) of his own work as well as that of others."

== Select list of publications ==
- Spanish Central America: A Socioeconomic History, 1520–1720. Berkeley and Los Angeles: University of California Press 1973. Reprinted 1984. Revised edition, University of Texas Press 2008. Published in Spanish translation Historia socio-económica de la América Central española, 1520–1720. Guatemala : Editorial Piedra Santa, 1980.
- Spaniards and Indians in Southeastern Mesoamerica: Essays on the History of Ethnic Relations, (edited with Robert Wasserstrom). Lincoln: University of Nebraska Press 1983.
- European intruders and changes in behaviour and customs in Africa, America, and Asia before 1800 (edited with Evelyn S. Rawski) Aldershot, Hampshire, Great Britain; Brookfield, VT : Ashgate, 1998.
- "Archival Empiricism, or Fine New Wine in Solid Old Bottles: Recent Writings on the History of Guatemala." Colonial Latin American Review, 8, no. 1 (June 1999), 139–144.
- "Aspects of the Internal Economy of Colonial Spanish America: Labour, Taxation, Distribution and Exchange," The Cambridge History of Latin America, Leslie Bethell, ed. New York: Cambridge University Press, 1987, Vol. II, 219–264, 836–840.
- "Aspects of the Internal Economy: Labour, Taxation, Distribution and Exchange" The Cambridge History of Latin America, vol. XI, Bibliographical Essays. New York Cambridge University Press 1995, 93–100.
- "Spain and America: the Atlantic Trade, 1492–1720," The Cambridge History of Latin America, Leslie Bethell, ed. Vol. I, 341–388, 599–604. New York: Cambridge University Press
- "Spain and America: the Atlantic Trade, 1492–c. 1720," The Cambridge History of Latin America, Vol XI, Bibliographical Essays. New York: Cambridge University Press 1995, pp. 50–56.
- The Cambridge History of the Native Peoples of the Americas. Vols. 5 and 6, Mesoamerica.. (edited with Richard E.W. Adams). New York: Cambridge University Press 2000.
- "Indian Confraternity Lands in Colonial Guatemala, 1660–1730: Some Uses and Trends." Ethnohistory 50, no. 1 (Winter 2003), 151–160.
- "Nuevas perspectivas sobre la historia colonial de Centroamérica entre 1520 y 1720," Mesoamérica 50 (enero-diciembre 2008), 159–191.
