= Ann Twinam =

American historian (born 1946)

- Education: Yale University
- Occupation: Historian
- Employer: University of Texas at Austin

Ann Twinam (born Cairo, Illinois 1946) is an American historian of colonial Latin America.

== Education ==
Twinam graduated from Northern Illinois University in 1968, and earned her master's (1972) and doctorate (1976) in history from Yale University. Her dissertation was published as a monograph in 1982 as Miners, Merchants, and Farmers in Colonial Colombia (University of Texas Press, Austin, Texas, 1982) and in a Spanish translation, Comerciantes y Labradores: Las Raíces del Espiritu Empresarial en Antioquia: 1763-1810 (Fundación Antioqueña para los Estudios Sociales, Medellín, Colombia, 1985).

== Career ==
She is a professor of history at the University of Texas at Austin. She taught at the University of Cincinnati from 1974 to 1998, where she received tenure in 1981. She won the 2016 Beveridge Award from the American Historical Association, the Bolton-Johnson Prize from the Conference on Latin American History, the Bryce Wood Book Award from the Latin American Studies Association, and the Bandelier/Lavrin Book Prize in Colonial Latin American History from the Rocky Mountain Council for Latin American Studies (RMCLAS). She won the 2000 Thomas F. McGann Book Prize from RMCLAS for Public Lives, Private Secrets: Gender, Honor, Sexuality and Illegitimacy in Colonial Spanish America and Honorable Mention in 2001 Bolton Prize from the Conference on Latin American History. This work was translated to Spanish as Vidas públicas, secretos privados: Género, honor, sexualidad e ilegitimidad en la Hispanoamérica colonial Twinam was chair of the Conference on Latin American History (2003–04), the professional organization of historians of Latin America, affiliated with the American Historical Association.
