= John Leddy Phelan =

John Leddy Phelan (1924–July 24, 1976) was a scholar of colonial Spanish America and the Philippines. He spent the bulk of his scholarly career as a professor at the University of Wisconsin, Madison.

== Biography ==
John Leddy Phelan was born in Fall River, Massachusetts to an Irish American family. Phelan graduated from Harvard College cum laude in History in 1947; he earned his doctorate at University of California, Berkeley in 1951. His dissertation on the Franciscan Order in early colonial Mexico became the basis for his first book, The Millennial Kingdom of the Franciscans in the New World: A Study of the Writings of Gerónimo de Mendieta (1525-1604) (1956, 2nd edition 1970), which remains an important work in the field of early Latin America. Phelan's monograph, The Hispanization of the Philippines: Spanish Aims and Filipino Responses(1959) continues to be one of the few works on the Spanish Empire focusing on the colonial Philippines and takes into account local responses to crown policies. His third monograph, The Kingdom of Quito in the Seventeenth Century: Bureaucratic Politics in the Spanish Empire (1967) is a mixture of political and social history, along with an important chapter on cultural history focusing on Mariana de Jesús de Paredes, known as the "Lily of Quito." In 1968 the book was accorded honorable mention for the Bolton Prize of the Conference on Latin American History. His last monograph, The People and the King: The Comunero Revolution in Colombia 1781, was on the Revolt of the Comuneros of New Granada. It was published posthumously and received the American Historical Association's Beveridge Award in 1978. Phelan was elected Chairman of the Conference on Latin American History in 1973. He was a Guggenheim Fellow, American Council of Learned Societies Fellow, Newberry Library Fellow. He served on the editorial boards of Hispanic American Historical Review and The Americas.

He died in Madison, Wisconsin on July 24, 1976.

== Influence ==
The historian James Lockhart was a graduate student who studied under Phelan.
