= George P. Hammond =

American historian

George Peter Hammond
- Born: September 19, 1896; Hutchinson, Minnesota, U.S.
- Died: December 3, 1993 (aged 97); Berkeley, California, U.S.
- Occupations: Professor of Latin American Studies and Director of the Bancroft Library
- Spouse: Carrie Nelson

George Peter Hammond (September 19, 1896 – December 3, 1993) was an American professor of Latin American studies. He published works related to the founding of New Mexico and other Spanish settlements in the United States. He was the director of the Bancroft Library at the University of California, Berkeley for 17 years.

== Early life and education ==
Hammond was born on September 19, 1896, in Hutchinson, Minnesota, the son of Danish immigrants Niels Peter Jensen Hammond (né Haumann) and his wife Christiane (née Svendsen). When he was 13 years old, his family moved to California. He attended the University of California, Berkeley in the fall of 1916, graduating in 1920 as a history major under Herbert E. Bolton. Hammond received a M.A. in 1921.

Hammond married Carrie Nelson, who was also of Danish ancestry, in 1921 while studying for his Ph.D. Hammond traveled to Spain for a year in the summer of 1922 through a graduate program at UC Berkeley. He received his doctorate in 1924.

== Teaching career ==
Hammond began his career as an American history professor at the University of North Dakota in 1923, where he began collaborating with Agapito Rey, a Spanish professor. They worked on translations from Spanish documents about the history and settlement of the Southwest. In 1925, Hammond became an associate professor of history at the University of Arizona. Two years later, he was invited to Los Angeles by the president of the University of Southern California. In Los Angeles, Hammond revised his doctoral thesis on Don Juan de Oñate and the founding of New Mexico, clarifying the Oñate's contract for establishing a colony in New Mexico, and adding more information about the desertion of the colony. In 1935, Hammond became a professor of history, head of the department, and dean of the Graduate School at the University of New Mexico, where he worked to improve relations between the university and New Mexico.

== Director of Bancroft Library ==
As a student at UC Berkeley, Hammond had worked as a student employee in the Bancroft library. In 1946, Hammond was appointed director of the Bancroft Library, which he helped develop from a small library primarily for scholars into a modern research library. During his time as director, he added to the library collections, expanded staff and specialists, and obtained new resources for the library. Hammond's contributions to the library included the purchase of a collection of Robert D. Honeymoon's paintings and original drawings. Hammond also edited a manuscript by Thomas O. Larkin, printed as The Larkin Papers. He retired in 1965, but continued his research and maintained a position at the Bancroft Library.

== Achievements ==
Hammond helped found the Pacific Historical Review and served on its first board of editors. He was also a member of the historical records survey of New Mexico. He served as the state director for New Mexico Historical Records Survey, W.P.A., from 1936 to 1939. He was a member of the U.S. delegation to the 4th Assembly of the Pan-American Institute of Geography and History at Caracas in 1946. Hammond was part of the Friends of Bancroft Library in the California Historical Society. He received an honorary degree of Doctor of Laws from the University of New Mexico in 1954. In 1950 he was elected chair of the Conference on Latin American History, the professional organization of Latin American historians.

== Works ==
- Don Juan de Oñate and the Founding of New Mexico (1927).
- The Story of New Mexico: Its History and Government (1936). University of New Mexico Press.
- The Adventure of Don Francisco Vasquez de Coronado (1938). University of New Mexico.
- The Larkin Papers: Personal, Business, and Official Correspondence of Thomas Oliver Larkin, Merchant and United States Consul in California (1964). University of California Press.
- A Guide to the Manuscript Collections: Manuscripts Relating Chiefly to Mexico and Central America (1972). Bancroft Library.
- The Adventure of Alexander Barclay, Mountain Man (1976). Old West Publishing Company.
- The Search for the Fabulous in the Settlement of the West. Utah State Historical Society.
