= Stanley J. Stein =

American historian (1920–2019)

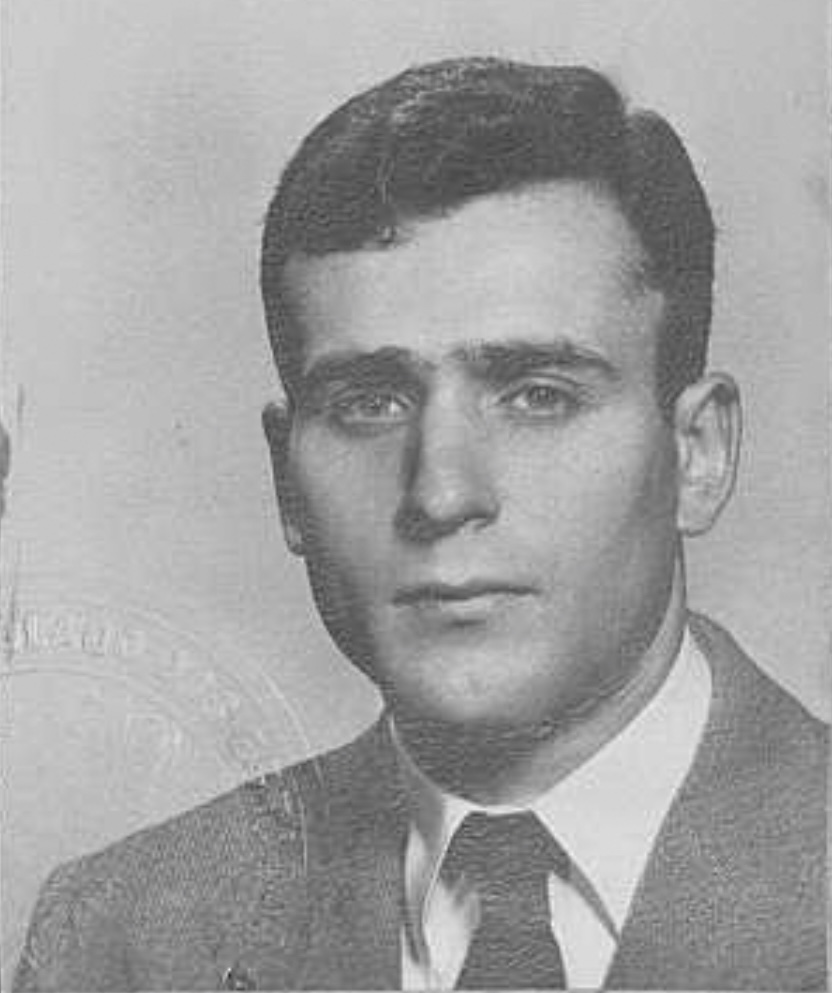
Stein in 1951

Stanley J. Stein (June 8, 1920 – December 19, 2019) was an American historian of Spanish America and Iberia, with interests in colonialism and post- colonialism as well as imperial history, political economy, and social history. Until his retirement, he taught at Princeton University, holding the Walter Samuel Carpenter III Professor of Spanish Civilization and Culture. His most well-known book is The Colonial Heritage of Latin America, published jointly with his wife, Barbara H. Stein (1916–2005), which explores the idea that Spain's restrictive policies on trade meant that Spanish America's wealth did not enrich the region while simultaneously turning Spain into a dependency of Northern Europe. In an interview published in 2010, Vincent Peloso says of this work, "It is fair to say that no one who studied Latin American history over the last 35 years would have failed to engage the slim, elegantly written synthesis." Stein went on to publish with his wife significant work on the rise and decline of the Spanish Empire, works bringing them both high academic recognition.

In 2018, Princeton University acquired a valuable collection of Brazilian manuscripts. "The acquisition honors Stanley and Barbara Stein's contributions to the library's Latin American collections and to Latin American studies at Princeton."

== Early life and career ==
Stein was born and raised in New York City, the son of Jewish European immigrants from Russian Poland, Joseph Louis Stein and Rose Epstein. He attended DeWitt Clinton High School, and went on to graduate from the City College, New York in 1941. He began graduate school at Harvard University, initially studying language and literature, and traveling to Brazil for research. With the outbreak of World War II, he served in the Navy. Before he deployed overseas, he married Barbara Ballou Hadley in 1943, whom he first met in Brazil. When demobilized after the war, he returned to Harvard, deciding to study history and he became a student of Clarence Haring, one of the leading figures in Latin American history. Stein returned to Brazil, working on his dissertation project on a coffee-growing region of Brazil.

His study of the coffee growing community of Vassouras is now considered a classic social and economic study of the origins, apogee, and decline of coffee. Published almost simultaneously with Vassouras was his work on the cotton industry in Brazil, which he researched in tandem with the project on coffee production. These works garnered him a Guggenheim fellowship in 1958.

Beginning with the publication of The Colonial Heritage of Latin America in 1970, Stein published monographs jointly with his wife Barbara H. Stein, also a distinguished historian as well as a Latin American bibliographer. Colonial Heritage began as a series of lectures to high school teachers established by Samuel Bailey at Rutgers University, but it has had a wide readership after its modest beginnings, translated in Spanish and other languages. In a series of three monographs, Stein and Stein analyzed extensive archival and published sources, as well as the secondary literature to argue how Spain rose and declined, failing to capitalize on the wealth of its empire to develop Spain itself, but rather saw the wealth accrue elsewhere in Europe. The crown's attempts to reform political and economic institutions of empire did not manage to make more than superficial changes. As reviewer Kenneth Maxwell put it in a review of the first two volumes, Silver, Trade, and War and Apogee of Empire, "Based on prodigious original research over several decades, these volumes do much to unravel the paradox of Spain's resilience as a great power during the eighteenth century. The authors also reveal the hollowness and rigidity of that power and show why Spain was unable, in the end, either to modernize or to benefit from its control of the main source of the world's bullion." When Stein began his academic career, economic history was relatively neglected, but it was part of the interdisciplinary framework for approaching history that he developed while at Harvard. Economic history later took hold in the field more generally. Stein's bibliographic work with Roberto Cortes Conde, modestly titled Latin America: A Guide to Economic History is described in a review as “A product of international collaboration at its best, it contains not only 4,552 titles, all annotated, but also a series of excellent historiographical essays.”

Stein's academic work with his wife Barbara H. Stein was recognized by the American Historical Association, which awarded them both the Award for Scholarly Distinction for senior scholars.

== Personal life ==
Stein lived in Princeton, New Jersey. He continued to work and maintained an office at Princeton University until his death on December 19, 2019. He is survived by three children and four grandchildren.

== Honors ==
- 1958 Conference on Latin American History prize for the best book in English. Vassouras: A Brazilian Coffee Country, 1850-1900 (Harvard University Press).
- 1958 Guggenheim Fellowship.
- 1972 Guggenheim Fellowship.
- 1976 President, Conference on Latin American History.
- 1991. Conference on Latin American History, Distinguished Service Award.
- 1996. American Historical Association Award for Scholarly Distinction (his wife, Barbara H. Stein was also awarded the honor that year).

== Works ==
=== Books ===
- 1957 Vassouras: A Brazilian Coffee Country, 1850-1900. Harvard University Press. ISBN 978-0691022369
- 1957 The Brazilian cotton manufacture; textile enterprise in an underdeveloped area, 1850-1950. Cambridge, Mass., Harvard University Press, 1957. Reissued 2014. ISBN 978-0674592544
- 1970. The Colonial Heritage of Latin America. With Barbara H. Stein. Vol. 10. New York: Oxford University Press. ISBN 978-0195012927
- 1970. La herencia colonial de América Latina/Colonial heritage of Latin America. Siglo xxi, 1970.
- 1977. Latin America: A Guide to Economic History. (edited with Roberto Cortes Conde). University of California Press. ISBN 978-0520029569
- 2000. Silver, trade, and war: Spain and America in the making of early modern Europe. With Barbara H. Stein. Johns Hopkins University Press. ISBN 978-0801877551
- 2003. Apogee of empire: Spain and New Spain in the age of Charles III, 1759–1789. With Barbara H. Stein. Johns Hopkins University Press. ISBN 978-0801873393
- 2009. Edge of crisis: War and trade in the Spanish Atlantic, 1789–1808. Johns Hopkins University Press, 2009. With Barbara H. Stein ISBN 978-1421414249
