= Ann Farnsworth-Alvear =

Ann Farnsworth-Alvear (born in Huntington, New York) is an associate professor of history at the University of Pennsylvania. She authored the book Dulcinea in the Factory: Myths, Morals, Men, and Women in Colombia's Industrial Experiment that was published by Duke University Press. In the book she identifies two crucial turning points in the history of the factories of Antioquia: the first being the radical unionization of previously unorganized workers, the second being when technological innovations and the rise of newly trained industrial engineers changed the dynamic of worker and management relations. Such issues are important in the economic history of Colombia and the history of the Latin American economy more generally. The book won the 2001 Bolton-Johnson Prize of the Conference on Latin American History, which "is awarded annually for the best English-language book on any aspect of Latin American History,"as well as the Allan Sharlin Prize of the Social Science History Association. She published in Duke University Press's series of readers on particular countries The Colombia Reader: History, Culture, Politics in 2016.
