= Kenneth Maxwell =

British historian (born 1941)

Kenneth Robert Maxwell (born 3 February 1941) is a British historian of Iberia and Latin America, educated at Queen's College, Taunton, Somerset (1951-1960), St John's College, Cambridge University (1960-1963) where he studied under Ronald Robinson, Edward Miller, Professor Sir Harry Hinsley (The British Academy, https://www.thebritishacademy.ac.uk > memoirs > hinsl...) and Johanthan Steinberg, and at Princeton University where his doctoral adviser was Professor Stanley J. Stein.

== Career ==
In 1963, Kenneth Maxwell studied at the University of Madrid and was a Gulbenkian grantee in Lisbon in 1964. In September 1964 he entered the graduate program in Latin American History at Princeton University where his supervisor was Professor Stanley Stein.

Maxwell was a Newberry library-Gulbenkian fellow in Chicago (1968-1969)(https://publications.newberry.org >...). He was appointed an assistant and later an associate professor of Luso-Brazilian history at the University of Kansas in Lawrence. In 1971 and 1972 he was the Herodotus fellow in the School of Historical Studies at the Institute for Advanced Study at Princeton. Between 1972 and 1975 he remained at the Institute in the school of historical studies, with the support of a Rockefeller Foundation grant and in 1974-75 as a joint appointment in the school of historical studies and the newly established school of social sciences. He was a John Simon Guggenheim Fellow from 1975-76 (https://www.gf.org > fellows > k...), and was then appointed an associate professor of history at Columbia University (1976-1984), becoming the director of the Camões Center at Columbia University in 1988-1999. He was a senior fellow at the Research Institute on International Change at Columbia University from 1978-1992 and a Senior Research Associate at the Institute for Latin American Studies at Columbia University from 1992-2000. He was the program director of the Tinker Foundation (1979-1983). A long-time member of the Council on Foreign Relations for fifteen years, Maxwell headed its Latin America Studies Program and was the director of studies and vice-president in 1996. He was the first Nelson and David Rockefeller Senior Fellow for Inter-American Affairs (1996-2004) and was the Western Hemisphere book reviewer for Foreign Affairs from 1995 until 2004. His 13 May 2004 resignation from the council and Foreign Affairs involved a major controversy over whether there had been a breach of the so-called "church-state separation" between the council itself and its magazine Foreign Affairs. He endowed a Kenneth Maxwell thesis prize for the best senior thesis on Brazil at the David Rockafeller Center (https://rll.fas.harvard.edu > pages > kenneth - maxwell - the...) As well as a Kenneth Maxwell thesis prize for the best senior thesis on Brazil at Princeton University (https://plas.princeton.edu/certificate - programs/senior-thesis- prizes). As of 2004 Maxwell became a professor of History at Harvard University and a senior fellow at Harvard University David Rockefeller Center for Latin American Studies, where he established and was the founding director the Brazil Studies Program (2004-2013). He was a weekly columnist for the Folha de São Paulo (2005-2015)(https://www.folha.uol.com.br) and O Globo (2015- )(https://oglobo.globo.com) and has written for the New York Review of Books (https://www.nybooks.com), and Defense.info (https://defense.info > book > ken...) and many other publications. He was a Visiting associate professor of Latin American and Caribbean Studies at New York University (1978–79), a Visiting Professor of History and Latin American Studies at Princeton (1985–86) and a Visiting Professor of History at Yale (1991–92). He donated his collection of books on Brazil, Portugal and Latin America to the Library of St. John's College, Cambridge University. (https://www.jon.cam.uk > kenneth - maxwell - collection...) On June 5, 2024, The Federal University of Sergipe in Brazil awarded Professor Kenneth Maxwell a doutor honoris causa

== Selected bibliography ==
- Conflicts and Conspiracies: Brazil and Portugal, 1750-1808 (Cambridge University Press,1973)
- Conflicts and Conspiracies: Brazil and Portugal, 1750-1808 (Routledge, 2004)
- A Devassa da Devassa, A Inconfidência Mineira: Brasil e Portugal 1750-1808 (Paz e Terra, 1977)
- Spanish Constitution (ed) Research Institute on International Change, Columbia University (1998)
- A Devassa da Devassa (7a edição ampliada e ilustrada, Paz e Terra, 2010)
- The Press and the Rebirth of Iberian Democracy (ed) (Greenwood Press,1983)
- Portugal: Ten Years after the Revolution (ed) (Research Institute on International Change) (1984)
- Spain's Prospects, (ed) The Spanish Institute, New York (1985)
- Soviet dilemmas in Latin America: Pragmatism or Ideology (with Susan Clark) (1989)
- Portugal: Ancient Country, New Democracy (ed) Wilson Center Press, Washington D.C (1989)
- Portugal in the 1980s (ed) (Greenwood Press, 1988)
- Spanish Foreign and Defense Policy (ed) (Westview, 1991)
- Portuguese Defense and Foreign Policy (ed) Camões Center, Columbia University, (1991)
- Portugal: The Constitution and the consolidation of Democracy (Camões Center, 1991)
- The New Spain: From Isolation to Influence (Council on Foreign Relations,1994)
- Political Democracy in Portugal on its 20th anniversary (Council on Foreign Relations,1994)
- The Making of Portuguese Democracy (Cambridge University Press, 1995)
- A construção da Democracia em Portugal (Presença, 1997)
- Pombal, Paradox of the Enlightenment (Cambridge University Press,1995)
- Marquês de Pombal: Paradoxo do Iluminismo (Paz e Terra, 1996)
- Task Force Report, A letter to the President on Brazil policy (New York, 2001)
- O Império Derrotada, Revolução e Democracia em Portugal (Companhia das Letras, 2006)
- O Marquês de Pombal: Ascensão e Queda, (Manuscrito, 2015)
- Chocolate, Piratas e Outros Malandros, Ensaios Tropicais, (Paz e Terra, 1999)
- O Marquês de Pombal (Presença, 2001)
- Mais Malandros, Ensaios Tropicais e Outros (Paz e Terra, 2002)
- Naked Tropics: Essays on Empire and Other Rogues (Rutledge, 2003)
- Brazil Studies Program, Harvard University, Cambridge, MA.,(Report on Activities, 2006/2007)
- O Livro de Tiradentes (coordinator)(Penguin/Companhia das Letras, 2013)
- An Historian of the 18th Century Looks at the Contemporary World (ed) Robbin Laird (2023)
- Brazil in a Changing World Order: Essays by Kenneth Maxwell (ed) Robbin Laird (2024)
- Perspectives on Portuguese History: The 2024 Lectures of Professor Kenneth Maxwell (2025)
- The Tale of Three Cities: The Rebuilding of London, Paris and Lisbon (2025)
- 18th Century Globalization: The American Revolutionary Ideal Comes to Brazil (2026)
- Globalização do século XVIII: A Conspiração de Minas e o Atlantico Revolucionario (2026)
- 18e siecle Mondialisation: Le Point de transit intellectuel francais (2026)
- (with Robbin Laird) The Australian, Brazilian and Chinese Dynamic: An Investigation (2026)
- (with Robbin Laird, O Brasil, A Australia, e A China no Mundo em Evolução (2026)
- Conto das Tres Cidades: A reconstrucao de Londres, Lisboa e Paris (edicao Kindle, 2026)

Honours:

- Grande Cruz, Ordem Nacional do Mérito Científico, Brazil, 1996
- Commander, Ordem do Rio Branco, Brazil, 1997
- Grande Oficial, Ordem do Infante D. Henrique, Portugal, 2003
- John Simon Guggenheim Fellow, 1985–86
- Luso-American Foundation Fellow, 1986–87
- Senior Fellow, Council on Foreign Relations, 1989-2004
- Honorary Fellow, Institute of Romance Studies, University of London (1993-)
- Sócio Correspondente Estrangeiro, Instituto Histórico e Geográfico Brasileiro (1994-)
- Doutor Honoris Causa, Universidade Federal de Sergipe, Brazil (2024).

== Board member ==
- LASPAU (1996-1997)
- American Portuguese Society, (1979-1997)
- Tinker Foundation (2002-2008)
- Americas Watch/Americas (Advisory Board) (1996-
- Luso-American Foundation, Advisory Council (1996-2000)
- Spanish Institute (1997-2004)
- David Rockefeller Center, Harvard University, Advisory Committee (2010)

== Consultancies ==
- Ford Foundation, Brazil Office, (1985–87)
- Woodrow Wilson Center, Washington D.C. (1989-1990)
- Institute for Defense Analysis, Washington, D.C. (1986-1992)
- Hewlett Foundation. Mexico Program Review (1992)
- Tinker Foundation (review of Tinker Chairs (1985-1987)
