= J. Fred Rippy =

American historian

James Fred Rippy (27 October 1892 in Nubia, Tennessee – 10 February 1977) was an American professor, author, and a historian of Latin America and American diplomacy.

== Biography ==
J. Fred Rippy grew up on a subsistence farm in Tennessee until a fire destroyed several farm buildings and forced his parents in 1902 to move to Richardson, Texas to live with relatives. He graduated from high school in 1907 and in 1909, enrolled at Southwestern University, where he graduated in 1913. After teaching for one year at Clebarro College in Cleburne, Texas, he enrolled at Vanderbilt University, where he received an M.A. after one year of study. In 1915 he married Mary Dozier Allen of Nashville, Tennessee. From 1915 to 1917 he taught at Duncan School for Boys in Nashville. In 1917 he received a scholarship for doctoral study at the University of California, Berkeley. In 1920, Rippy received his PhD under Herbert Eugene Bolton with thesis The relations of the United States and Mexico, 1848–1860. Rippy became an instructor of Latin American history at the University of Chicago from 1920 to 1923, then assistant professor from 1923 to 1924, and associate professor from 1924 to 1926. He was a Guggenheim Fellow for the academic year 1926–1927. From 1926 to 1936 he was a full professor at Duke University and from 1928 to 1936 the director of Duke University Press. He was one of the founders of the Conference on Latin American History, the professional organization of Latin American historians, serving as its chair on a number of occasions. In 1936, he returned as a full professor to the University of Chicago, where he remained until his retirement as professor emeritus in 1958. He was a prolific author of books, articles, and book reviews on Latin American and American diplomatic history. Rippy was a visiting professor and guest lecturer at various colleges and universities throughout the U.S.A. He was an active member and served on committees of the American Historical Association, the editorial board (in 1932–1937) of the American Historical Review, and the editorial board of the Hispanic American Historical Review.

After his retirement he lived in Durham, N.C. until 1972 when he and his wife moved to Wilmington, N.C. He and his wife Mary had children J. Fred Junior, Robert Allen, and Frazier Winston; and several grandchildren.

== Selected works ==
- Some precedents of the Pershing expedition into Mexico. 1921.
- "The United States and the establishment of the republic of Brazil". The Southwestern Political Science Quarterly. 3 (1). June 1922.
- Pan-Hispanic propaganda in Hispanic America. 1922.
- with Angie Debo: Historical background of the American policy of isolation. 1924.
- United States and Mexico. 1926.
- Latin America in world politics, an outline survey. 1928.
- with José Vasconcelos and G. Stevens: Mexico. American Policies Abroad. U. of Chicago Press. 1928.
- Rivalry of the United States and Great Britain over Latin America (1808-1830). 1929.
- Capitalists and Colombia. 1931.
- Historical evolution of Hispanic America. 1932.
- Joel R. Poinsett, versatile American. 1935.
- with Jean Thomas Nelson (with illustrations by Willis Physioc): Crusaders of the jungle. 1936.
- America and the strife of Europe. 1938.
- Caribbean danger zone; with end-paper maps. 1940.
- South America and hemisphere defense. 1941.
- Latin America and the industrial age. 1944.
- with Lynn I. Perrigo: Latin America, its history and culture. 1944.
- Globe and hemisphere: Latin America's place in the postwar foreign relations of the United States. 1958.
- Latin America: a modern history. 1958. revised and enlarged edition 1968
- British investments in Latin America, 1822-1949. 1966.
