= John Tate Lanning =

American historian

John Tate Lanning (born 1902, died 15 August 1976, Durham, North Carolina) was a historian of Spanish America and held the James B. Duke Professor Emeritus position at Duke University. He was a major scholar of colonial Spanish American history and worked to strengthen organizations devoted to Latin American scholarship. In one obituary he was called, “a true giant” in the field. His work on the Spanish Enlightenment in Spanish America challenged received understandings of Spanish obscurantism.

In 1957, Lanning's book The Eighteenth-Century Enlightenment in the University of San Carlos de Guatemala won the first Herbert E. Bolton Prize of the Conference on Latin American History for the best book in English. He served as editor of The Hispanic American Historical Review, expanding its readership and maintaining high standards for each issue. He served as chair of the Conference on Latin American History, the professional organization of Latin American historians, in 1958.

Lanning was a student of Herbert E. Bolton, a leading figure in U.S. borderlands history at University of California, Berkeley; and Lanning's early publications were on Southeast borderlands history, both monographs and edited historical texts. He began pursuing Spanish American intellectual history when he held a Guggenheim Fellowship in 1930. As editor of The Hispanic American Historical Review, he expanded the circulation of the journal arranging with the Office of the Coordinator of Inter-American Affairs (and later the Carnegie Endowment for International Peace by giving gratis copies to scholars in Latin America.

== Works ==
- The Spanish missions of Georgia. Chapel Hill, The University of North Carolina press 1935
- A Brief Description of Carolina on the Coasts of Florida, editor 1944
- The legend that Governor Moral Sánchez was hanged. Savannah, Georgia Historical Society, 1954.
- The Saint Augustine Expedition of 1740: Report of the South Carolina General Assembly, editor, Columbia SC: South Carolina Archives Department 1954
- Reales cédulas de la Real y Pontificia Universidad de San Carlos de Guatemala. Guatemala, Editorial Universitaria, 1954.
- Academic Culture in the Spanish Colonies. London: Oxford University Press 1940
- ”Research Possibilities in the Cultural History of Spain in America” ‘’Hispanic American Historical Review’’ 16 (1936)
- The University in the Kingdom of Guatemala. Ithaca, N.Y., Cornell University Press 1955
- The Eighteenth-Century Enlightenment in the University of San Carlos de Guatemala, Ithaca, N.Y.: Cornell University Press 1956.
- Pedro de la Torre: Doctor to Conquerors. Baton Rouge, Louisiana State University Press 1974.
- The royal protomedicato : the regulation of the medical professions in the Spanish empire. Durham, N.C.: Duke University Press, 1985.
