= Richard Graham (historian) =

Brazilian-American historian

Richard Graham (born 1934 in Goiás, Brazil) is a Brazilian/American historian specializing in nineteenth-century Brazil. He was formerly Professor of History, University of Texas at Austin, and is now professor emeritus there. He served as president of the Conference on Latin American History, the professional organization of Latin American historians.

== Works ==
- Feeding the City: From Street Market to Liberal Reform in Salvador, Brazil, 1780-1860, University of Texas Press, 2010
- Patronage and Politics in Nineteenth-Century Brazil, Stanford University Press, 1990
- Britain and the Onset of Modernization in Brazil Cambridge University Press, 1968
- The Idea of Race in Latin America edited, University of Texas Press, 1990
- Juggling Race and Class in Brazil's Past PMLA 123:5 (Oct. 2008)
- Another Middle Passage? The Internal Slave Trade in Brazil, in Walter Johnson, Chattel Principle Yale University Press 2004
- Slavery and Economic Development: Brazil and the U.S. South Comparative Studies in Society and History, 23:4 (Oct 1981)
- Constructing a Nation in Nineteenth-Century Brazil: Old and New Views on Class, Culture, and the State, Journal of the Historical Society, Boston University, Volume 1, Number 2-3, spring 2001
- Independence in Latin America: A Comparative Approach Knopf, 1972, McGraw-Hill, 1994
