= Ida Altman =

American historian

Ida Louise Altman
- Born: April 14, 1950 (age 76); Casablanca, Morocco
- Awards: Herbert E. Bolton Prize (1990)

Academic background
- Education: University of Michigan (BA); University of Texas at Austin (MA); Johns Hopkins University (PhD)

Academic work
- Discipline: History
- Sub-discipline: Early Modern Spain, Latin America
- Institutions: University of Florida, University of New Orleans, Hebrew University of Jerusalem
- Notable works: Emigrants and Society: Extremadura and Spanish America in the Sixteenth Century

Ida Louise Altman (born 1950) is an American historian of early modern Spain and Latin America. Her book Emigrants and Society: Extremadura and Spanish America in the Sixteenth Century received the 1990 Herbert E. Bolton Prize of the Conference on Latin American History. She is Professor Emerita of History at the University of Florida and served as Department Chair.

Altman is noted as a social historian for her primary research into migration patterns and individual migrations in the Spanish colonial period and the effects of source communities in the Old World on the economies and social development of destination communities in the New World, and vice versa.

== Life and education ==
Ida Altman was born in Washington, D.C. She graduated from Washington-Lee High School (now Washington-Liberty High School) in Arlington, Virginia. She received her B.A. from the University of Michigan, Ann Arbor; a master's degree from the University of Texas at Austin; and her Ph.D. from Johns Hopkins University, where she studied Atlantic history.

Altman taught at the Hebrew University in Jerusalem and taught for many years at the University of New Orleans, where she was Professor of History and then designated University Research Professor. She served as chair of the History department until shortly after Hurricane Katrina in 2005. Dr. Altman joined the faculty of the University of Florida in August 2006 and became chair of the history department in August 2010.

In 2002, she married Richmond F. Brown (1961-2016), a historian of Guatemala (PhD Tulane University).

== Publications ==
Altman's first article was published in 1976, "A Family and Region in the Northern Fringe Lands: The Marqueses de Aguayo of Nuevo León and Coahuila", in the now classic anthology on regional variation in colonial Mexico. For her study of the elite Marqueses de Aguayo over several generations, she drew on rich archival sources, mainly at the University of Texas, with specificity of locale and individuals, and placed them within the larger colonial world.

When Altman finished her Ph.D. in 1982, the idea of the Atlantic World was not widely accepted as a field in history, although Johns Hopkins University was an important innovator in this field. Through meticulous archival research, she traced patterns of Spanish conquistadors returning to their home region of Extremadura in Western Spain. Her doctoral dissertation brought attention to the whole field of Spanish Atlantic history, which culminated when she was a co-winner of the Conference on Latin American History's Bolton Prize (1990) for the book, followed quickly by a prize awarded by the Spanish Ministry of Culture.

Altman followed up Emigrants and Society quickly with her second co-edited and co-authored volume, "To Make America": European Immigration in the Early Modern Period, which broadened the conversation about transatlantic migration.

In her second single-author monograph, Transatlantic Ties, Altman focused on two particular localities, the textile-producing Spanish town of Brihuega and Mexico's second-most important colonial city, Puebla de los Angeles. She traced social and economic networks, as well as cultural continuities and discontinuities in the late sixteenth and early seventeenth centuries. Puebla was a natural way-station between the port of Veracruz and the viceregal capital, Mexico City, but it developed as a rich agricultural zone and as a locus for textile production for a colonial mass market. Push factors from Spain as local industry declined meant that Puebla represented new economic horizons for skilled Spanish immigrants. Altman's research and reconstruction of social networks in Brihuega and Puebla shows how immigrants maintained their identity in a new location. Her work demonstrates that identity politics of immigrants is not a modern phenomenon, but one with a long history.

In her third major monograph, The War for Mexico's West, Altman brings to an English-speaking readership the story of the Spanish attempts to conquer and settle Western Mexico, a far more complex and lengthy endeavor than the quick and decisive victory which they had gained in Central Mexico with the aid of indigenous allies. This historical study blends narrative history of the early campaigns from both the Spanish and indigenous perspectives, without the benefit of contemporary accounts by the participants. Through the close reading of Spanish-language documentation she has been able to produce a multifaceted picture of the indigenous peoples' response to Spanish conquest, settlement, and attempts to extract labor and tribute where there were no indigenous precedents. Unlike the conquest of central Mexico, the war in the west was protracted and marked by the most serious challenge to Spanish triumphalist expansion in the multi-ethnic region rebellion known in history as the Mixtón War (1541). Altman examines the initial Spanish expeditions to the region, one by a kinsman of Hernán Cortés, and then the more horrific campaign of Nuño de Guzmán.

Altman's examination of the historical dynamics of the Mixtón rebellion is concrete evidence for long-term, complex planning by multiple indigenous groups to expel the Spaniards and regain their autonomy. Her examination of the role of viceroy Don Antonio de Mendoza in putting down the rebellion supports the general picture of Mendoza as a remarkable administrator. In Altman's close examination of Mendoza's end-of-term assessment (residencia) she recounts incidents that show even he had a ruthless and pragmatic side. Altman's book brings narrative back into history, which is particularly for non-specialists.

In Altman's fourth single-author monograph, Life and Society in the Early Spanish Caribbean: The Greater Antilles, 1493–1550 (2021), she examines the half century of European activity in the Caribbean that followed Columbus’s first voyages. Those brought enormous demographic, economic, and social change as Europeans, Indigenous people, and Africans whom Spaniards imported to provide skilled and unskilled labor came into extended contact for the first time. The book examines their interactions and the transformation of the islands of the Greater Antilles, addressing the impact of disease and ongoing conflict, the Spanish monarchy’s efforts to establish a functioning political system and an Iberian church, the islands’ economic development, and the formation of a highly unequal and coercive but dynamic society. She discusses the work in an author interview with James Boyden.

With Mexicanist colleagues Sarah Cline and Javier Pescador, Altman co-authored a textbook entitled The Early History of Greater Mexico. It is described in a review as "the best textbook on colonial Mexico to date. It is unrivaled in its breadth of coverage and its insight." There is ample coverage of the conquest of Mexico as an event as well as a separate chapter on narratives of the conquest. There is a strong emphasis on socioeconomic history of different regions of Mexico. "Greater Mexico" in the title alludes to the territorial expanse of New Spain's northwest, which is now the Southwest of the U.S.

== Select publications ==
- Life and Society in the Early Spanish Caribbean: The Greater Antilles, 1493–1550. Baton Rouge: Louisiana State University Press 2021. ISBN 978-0807175781
- "Failed experiments: negotiating freedom in early Puerto Rico and Cuba." Colonial Latin American Review: Vol 29, No 1. April 2020
- ed. with David Wheat. The Spanish Caribbean and the Atlantic World in the Long Sixteenth Century. Lincoln: University of Nebraska Press 2019. ISBN 978-0803299573
- Contesting Conquest: Indigenous Perspectives on the Spanish Occupation of Nueva Galicia, 1524–1545. Penn State University Press 2017. ISBN 978-0-271-07856-4
- "Key to the Indies: Port Towns in the Spanish Caribbean: 1493-1550." The Americas 74:1(Jan. 2017):5-26.
- The War for Mexico's West. Indians and Spaniards in New Galicia, 1524-1550. Albuquerque, New Mexico, 2010. ISBN 978-0826344939
- "The Revolt of Enriquillo and the Historiography of Early Spanish America," The Americas vol. 63(4)2007, 587-614
- (with Sarah Cline & Juan Javier Pescador), The Early History of Greater Mexico. Upper Saddle River, NJ: Prentice Hall, 2003. ISBN 978-0130915436
- Transatlantic Ties in the Spanish Empire: Brihuega, Spain, and Puebla, Mexico, 1560-1620. Stanford, CA: Stanford University Press, 2000. ISBN 978-0804736633
- Editor, (with James J. Horn). "To Make America": European Emigration in the Early Modern Period. Berkeley: University of California Press, 1991. ISBN 978-0520325678
- Emigrants and Society: Extremadura and Spanish America in the Sixteenth Century. Berkeley: University of California Press, 1989. ISBN 978-0520064942
- Editor, (with James Lockhart). Provinces of early Mexico: variants of Spanish American regional evolution. Los Angeles: UCLA Latin American Center Publications, University of California, 1976. ISBN 978-0879030360
- "Marriage, Family, and Ethnicity in the Early Spanish Caribbean," William and Mary Quarterly, 3rd ser. 70:2(2013):226-250.
