= Asunción Lavrin =

Cuban academic

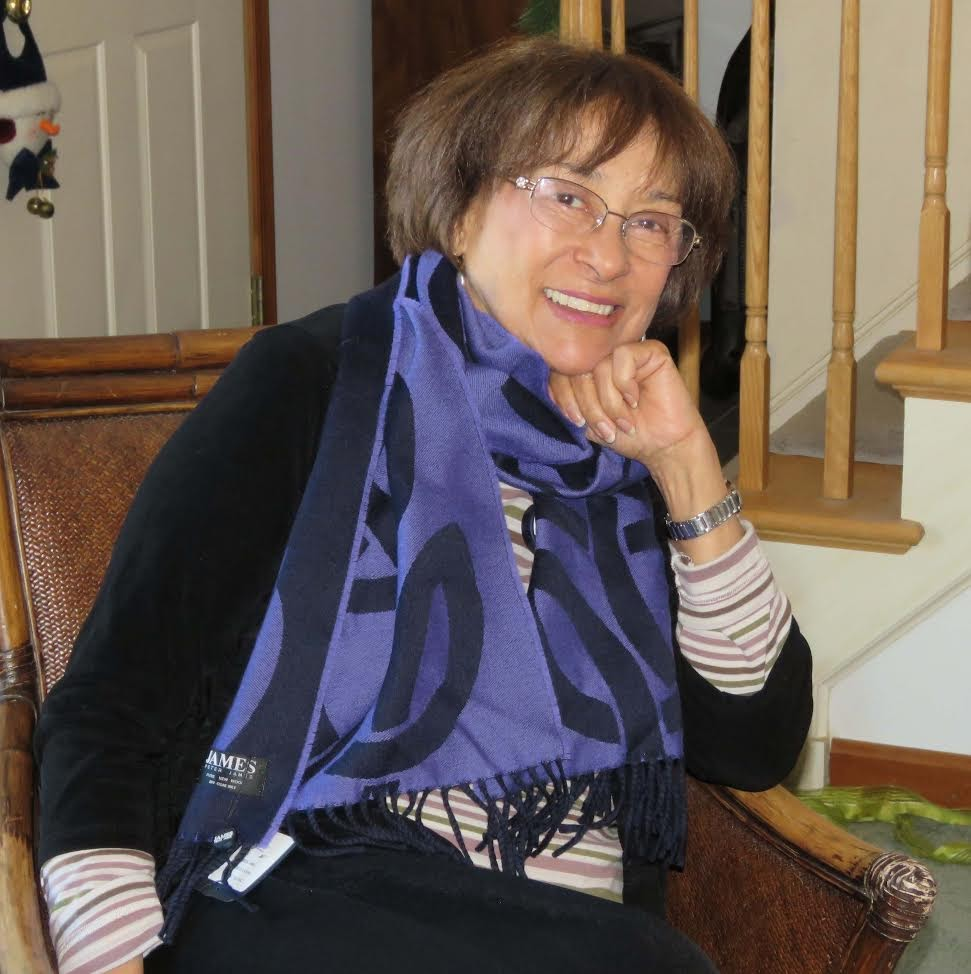
- Born: 1935 (age 90–91); Havana, Cuba
- Occupations: Historian, author

Asunción Lavrin (born 1935 in Havana, Cuba) is a historian and author, notably in topics of gender and women's studies in colonial and twentieth century Latin America as well as religion and spirituality in Colonial Mexico. She is Professor Emerita at Arizona State University.

== Personal life ==
Lavrin is the daughter-in-law of the artist Nora Fry Lavrin. She has two children, Cecilia and Andy, and two grand children, Erik and Nora.

== Education and academic career ==
After entering the US for a Master of Arts at Radcliffe College (completed in 1957), Lavrin completed a PhD dissertation at Harvard University in 1963, entitled: "Religious Life of Mexican Women in the XVIII Century". Lavrin was among the first group of women to receive a doctorate from the Harvard Graduate School of Arts and Sciences.

== Publications ==
Lavrin has published extensively on women in Latin America, especially on women in Mexico. She has contributed significantly to the history of Roman Catholicism in Mexico, beginning with a number of her early articles drawn from her dissertation on nuns and nunneries, culminating in her monograph Brides of Christ. Conventual Life in Colonial Mexico (Stanford, 2008) She also has addressed the economic issues of elite secular women in colonial Mexico, in her co-authored work on dowries and wills of women in Mexico City and Guadalajara. She also has interests in more general topics of colonial Mexican economic history such as her analysis of the relation between the social elites and ecclesiastical wealth.

Her interest in women's history includes the history of feminism, women in Argentina, women in Chile, and women in Uruguay, developed in her monograph Women, Feminism and Social Change: Argentina, Chile and Uruguay, 1890–1940 (Nebraska Press, 1995). A review of this work by Virginia Leonard notes "Asunción Lavrin is ... a pioneer in Latin American women's history. ... The publication of this book marks a watershed for Latin American studies: It is difficult to conceive that there will be any more books on politics and political parties in the Southern Cone that ignore women and feminist issues."

Lavrin has also edited several books on women, including Latin American Women: Historical Perspectives (Greenwood Press, 1978) and two volumes co-edited with Rosalva Loreto: Diálogos espirituales: Letras femeninas Hispanoamericanas, Siglos XVI–XIX, and Monjas y Beatas: La escritura femenina en la espirtualidad barroca novohispana. Siglos XVII y XVIII. (Mexico: Archivo General de la Nación/Universidad de las Américas, 2002) and Latin American Women: Historical Perspectives (Greenwood Press, 1978). She also co-edited a book with Rosalva Loreto on the colonial theatre written for religious women, El universo de la Teatralidad en Nueva España. Siglos XVII-XIX. She was a senior editor of The Oxford Encyclopedia of Women in World History (Oxford, 2008) and for the four volume Historia de las mujeres en España y América Latina (Cátedra, 2006), to which she contributed two chapters.

Currently, she is interested in the history of friars in the Mendicant Orders of colonial Mexico and has finished a book manuscript on that topic to be published by The University of Nebraska Press.

Additional recent publications include:

Books:

Maria Casilda del Pozo y Calderón Autobiografía de una devota secular en Nueva España. San Antonio, Texas: UNAM-San Antonio, 2023.

El universo de la Teatralidad Conventual en Nueva España, Siglos XVII-XIX. Coauthored with Rosalva Loreto López. San Antonio, Texas: UNAM /San Antonio, 2022.

Brides of Christ. Conventual Life in Colonial Mexico (Stanford: Stanford University Press, 2008). Translated into Spanish as Las Esposas de Cristo. La vida conventual en Nueva España. Mexico: Fondo de Cultura Económica, 2016.

Forthcoming 2025: Men of God. Mendicant Friars in Colonial Mexico. (University of Nebraska Press).

Articles in Academic Journals:

“Franciscan Missionaries as Witnesses of Nature in Colonial Mexico.” Archivum Franciscanum Historicum, 2022, Vol. 115:4, 237-286.

“Un intento de autobiografía: la aspiración truncada de María Ignacia del Niño Jesús.” En Relaciones, Revista del Colegio de Michoacán, 2017, 13-45.

“Santa Teresa en los conventos de monjas de Nueva España.” Hispania Sacra, 67:136 2015, 505-29.

“ El umbral de la vida religiosa: el noviciado de los frailes mendicantes.” En Pilar Martínez, ed. "De la historia económica a la historia social y cultural. Homenaje a Gisela von Wobeser," México: UNAM, 2016, pp. 235–261.

“Lay Brothers: The Other Men in the Mendicant Orders of New Spain.” The Americas, 72:3, 2015, 1-28.

Book Chapters:

“Sororidad conventual en Nueva España. Debate de conceptos y realidades.” En Angela Atienza López, editora, Historia de la sororidad, historias de sororidad. Manifestaciones femeninas y formas de solidaridad femenina en la edad Moderna. Madrid: Marcial Pons, 2022, 429-464.

“La familia en un contexto religioso: el caso de la Nueva España.” In Familias y Redes Sociales. Cotidianidad y realidad del mundo iberoamericano y mediterraneo. Coords. Sandra Olivero Guidobono, Juan Jesús Bravo Caro, Rosalva Loreto López, Madrid: Iberoamericana-Vervuert, 2021.

“La pluma conventual de las franciscanas novohispanas.” In Historia Franciscana. V Centenario de la Presencia Franciscana en Mexico, edited by Sergio Rivera Guerrero and Fr. Octavio Luna Alvarez, OFM. 3 Vol.s, Querétaro: Universidad Autónoma de Querétaro/Provincia Franciscana de San Pedro y San Pablode Michoacán, 2017. I: 243-57.

“La visión de la historia entre las órdenes mendicantes novohispanas: el cronista religioso en la cultura urbana.” In Francisco Cervantes Bello, coord., Libros y lectores en las sociedades hispanas: España y Nueva España (S. XVI-XVIII), Puebla: BUAP, 2016, 25-55.

Academic Profile:

“Historian with a Double Major: The Church and Feminism.” The Catholic Historical Review, Vol. 107. No. 4, Autumn 2021, 460-481.

== Awards and academic distinctions ==
Lavrin received the MACLAS (Middle Atlantic Council of Latin American Studies) Harold Eugene Davis Prize (1998–99) for best article published by a MACLAS member with the article “Indian Brides of Christ: Creating New Spaces for Indigenous Women in New Spain.”

In 2001-02, Lavrin served as President of the Conference on Latin American History (CLAH), an organization of Latin American historians affiliated with the American Historical Association. In 2008, she received the CLAH Distinguished Service Award. She became a Corresponding Member of the Mexican Academy of History in 2013. In 2015, she received the Academic Distinction Award from the American Historical Association. She has been the recipient of grants from the National Endowment for the Humanities and the John Simon Guggenheim Foundation. In 2019, she was elected member of the American Academy of Arts and Sciences.

In honor of Professor Lavrin and Fannie Bandelier, the Rocky Mountain Council for Latin American Studies (RMCLAS) has funded an annual award, the Bandelier/Lavrin Award for the Best Book in Colonial Latin American History. According to the official website, the award is "named to honor two pioneers in the history of the Spanish American empire, the first [Fannie Bandelier] working in the early days of the field, the second [Asunción Lavrin] who forged a path in colonial history and served as a model for female historians in the profession." Lavrin is pictured on the RMCLAS website with the first winner, Ann Twinam (2016).
