= Susan E. Ramírez =

American historian

- Known for: Historian of Latin America

Susan E. Ramírez is an American historian and the Neville G. Penrose chair emeritus of history and Latin American studies at Texas Christian University. She has worked in academia for over thirty years, with a focus on colonialism in Latin America. In her 2022 publication, In Praise of the Ancestors, Ramírez makes a study of three native groups (the Kazembes, the Iroquois Confederation, and the Andeans), investigating the formation of historical consciousness and identity in pre-modern societies lacking written records.

== Selected Publications ==
- The World Upside Down: Cross-Cultural Contact and Conflict in Sixteenth-Century Peru (1996)
- To Feed and Be Fed: The Cosmological Bases of Authority and Identity in the Andes (2005)
- In Praise of the Ancestors: Names, Identity, and Memory in Africa and the Americas (2022)
