= Irving A. Leonard =

American historian and translator

Irving Albert Leonard (December 1, 1896 in New Haven, Connecticut – October 1, 1996 in Alexandria, Virginia) was an American historian and translator, specializing in Hispanic history and art. His best known publications are Books of the Brave (1949) and Baroque Times in Old Mexico: Seventeenth-Century Persons, Places and Practices (1959), which won the Conference on Latin American History award for the best book in English. Books of the Brave, a valuable account of the introduction of literary culture to Spain's New World, was updated in 1992. He had many papers published in the American Historical Review and the Hispanic American Historical Review, such as A Frontier Library, 1799 (Feb. 1943, vol. 23, no. 1, p. 21–51).

Leoanrd was raised in New Haven, Connecticut. He did his undergraduate studies in Yale. He then worked for three years in the Philippines in the early 1920s. He also taught high school for a time in California before beginning his graduate studies at the University of California, Berkeley. In 1960, Leonard served as chair of the Conference on Latin American History, the professional organization of Latin American historians.
