= Stuart B. Schwartz =

American academic

Stuart B. Schwartz is the George Burton Adams Professor of History at Yale University, the Chair of the Council of Latin American and Iberian Studies, and the former Master of Ezra Stiles College.

== Education ==
Schwartz was born in Springfield, Massachusetts. As an undergraduate he studied at Middlebury College and the Universidad Autonoma de Mexico. After receiving his undergraduate degree from Middlebury, he went on to study Latin American history at Columbia University, where he received his Ph.D. in 1968.

== Career ==
After Columbia, Schwartz taught at the University of Minnesota before joining the Yale faculty in 1996. Yale President Richard Levin has referred to Professor Schwartz as, "perhaps the most outstanding scholar of Brazilian history in the world." Schwartz has also undertaken scholarly research on Spain, Portugal and their colonies in the early modern Atlantic world.

== Works and awards ==
His scholarly publications include Sovereignty and Society in Colonial Brazil (1973), Early Latin America (1983), Sugar Plantations in the Formation of Brazilian Society (1985), Slaves, Peasants, and Rebels (1992), as editor, A Governor and His Image in Baroque Brazil (1979), Implicit Understandings (1994), Victors and Vanquished: Spanish and Nahua Views of the Conquest of Mexico (2000), Cambridge History of Peoples of the Americas. South America (1999).

In 2008 Schwartz published All Can Be Saved: Religious Toleration and Salvation in the Iberian Atlantic World (Yale University Press). The book traces the idea of tolerance in the Hispanic world from 1500-1820, focusing on the attitudes of common people rather than elites. The book received numerous awards including the 2008 Cundill International Prize in History, the 2009 American Academy of Religion Book Award for Excellence in the category of Historical Study of Religion, the 2009 John E. Fagg Prize awarded by the American Historical Association, the 2009 George L. Mosse Prize awarded by the American Historical Association, the 2009 Leo Gershoy Award awarded by the American Historical Association, and the Bolton-Johnson Prize awarded by the Conference on Latin American History. Schwartz's first Bolton-Johnson Prize was awarded to Sugar Plantations in the Formation of Brazilian Society (1985).

Schwartz was a fellow of the John Simon Guggenheim Memorial Foundation and the Institute of Advanced Studies in Princeton, New Jersey. In 1983 he served as chair of the Conference on Latin American History, the professional organization of Latin American historians.

Schwartz lives in Guilford, Connecticut, and Puerto Rico with his wife, scholar Maria Jordán, a senior lecturer in the Departments of Spanish and Portuguese and a lecturer in history at Yale, and author of Soñar La Historia: Vida y Textos de Lucrecia de León en la España del Siglo de Oro (Madrid: Siglo XXI, 2007).
