= Florencia Mallon =

American historian

Florencia Elizabeth Mallon
- Born: 28 October 1951; Santiago, Chile
- Education: Harvard University (B.A.); Yale University (M.A., M.Phil., Ph.D)
- Occupation: Historian
- Spouse: Steven Stern

Florencia Elizabeth Mallon (born 28 October 1951) is a Chilean historian of Latin America and colonialism.

== Life and work ==
Florencia Mallon was born in Santiago, Chile and attended high school in Argentina, Colombia and the United States. She graduated from Harvard University with a B.A., magna cum laude in literature and history in 1973. A graduate research seminar with John Womack that she took as a junior sparked her interest in Latin American history and she was awarded her M.A., M.Phil., and Ph.D. in that subject by Yale University in 1975, 1976 and 1980 respectively.

Mallon married her husband, Steven J. Stern in 1978 and they have two children together. Her first teaching job was at the Universidad Nacional Agraria La Molina in Lima, Peru where she co-taught a mini-seminar with her husband. She then became an instructor and then an assistant professor at Marquette University in 1979–82.

Mallon was then offered a position as an assistant professor of modern Latin American history at the University of Wisconsin at Madison in 1982. She was promoted to associate professor two years later and then to full professor in 1988.

Her second book, Peasant and Nation: The Making of Postcolonial Mexico and Peru, was designated a Centennial Book by the University of California Press and received the Bryce Wood Award from the Latin American Studies Association. "In 1995 she received the University of Wisconsin’s Emil H. Steiger Distinguished Teaching Award as well as the history department’s Karen Fredrikka Falk Johnson Distinguished Teaching Award."
