= Warren Dean (historian) =

Historian of Latin America (1932-1994)

Warren Dean (1932– May 21, 1994) was a prize-winning historian of modern Latin America, specializing in Brazil and environmental history. Following his accidental death by asphyxiation due to a defective gas line in his rented apartment in 1994, the Warren Dean Prize was established by the Conference on Latin American History in 1995.

== Early life and education ==
Dean was born in Passaic, New Jersey, in 1932. He moved with his family to Miami, when he was 14 years old. He attended the University of Miami, where he completed the Reserve Officers' Training Corps program and was subsequently commissioned a second lieutenant in the U.S. Air Force.

Following military service, he entered the program in Latin American history at the University of Florida, completing his dissertation in 1964 entitled "São Paulo's industrial élite, 1890–1960."

== Career ==
=== U.S. Air Force ===
During the Korean War, he was an air traffic controller in Maine.

=== Academia ===
Following completion of his doctorate, he taught at University of Texas, Austin (1965–70) and moved to New York University, where he remained until his death. His first monograph, The Industrialization of São Paulo (1969), was based on his dissertation work; his second monograph Rio Claro: A Brazilian Plantation System, 1820–1920 (1976) received Honorable Mention for the Conference on Latin American History's Bolton Prize, "awarded for the best book in English on any significant aspect of Latin American History that is published anywhere during the imprint year previous to the year of the award.". His final monograph on environmental history With Broadax and Firebrand: The Destruction of the Brazilian Atlantic Forest (1995) won the Bolton-Johnson Prize posthumously. He was awarded a John Simon Guggenheim Foundation Fellowship in 1980, and became a member of the Royal Geographical Society. He served on the editorial board of the Hispanic American Historical Review.

Dean organized the American Committee for Information on Brazil, during the military dictatorship in that country, documenting and denouncing the use of torture.
