= Eric Van Young =

American historian

Eric Van Young (January 3, 1946 – December 20, 2024), was an American historian of Mexico, who published extensively on socioeconomic and political history of the colonial era and the nineteenth century. He is most-known for his 2001 book, The Other Rebellion: Popular Violence, Ideology, and the Struggle for Mexican Independence, 1810-1821, which won a major prize awarded by the Conference on Latin American History. His article "The Islands in the Storm: Quiet Cities and Violent Countrysides in the Mexican Independence Era," published in Past and Present won the Conference on Latin American History Award in 1989.

He has also contributed to the study of haciendas and the historiography of rural history.

== Education ==
Van Young earned his B.A. with honors at University of Chicago in 1967 and completed his doctorate at University of California, Berkeley in 1978, with Woodrow Borah as his mentor.

== Teaching ==
He briefly taught at University of Minnesota-Twin Cities, University of Texas-Austin, and since 1982 spent his academic career at University of California, San Diego. He chaired the History Department and was interim Dean of the Arts and Humanities Division.

He was awarded a John Simon Guggenheim Fellowship in 2011 for his project on Lucas Alamán, a founder of Mexico’s conservative party following independence in 1821.

== Honors ==
- Awardee, Conference on Latin American History, Distinguished Service Award 2017
- President, Conference on Latin American History, 1992
- Conference on Latin American History, Bolton/Johnson Prize for Best Book in English, 2002 for The Other Rebellion.

== Publications ==
Many of Van Young’s publications have been translated to Spanish and he has collaborated with a number of Mexican scholars. In 2007, he was named a corresponding member of the Mexican Academy of Sciences, "a rare honor for a foreigner."

=== Books ===
- Hacienda and Market in Eighteenth-Century Mexico: The Rural Economy of the Guadalajara Region, 1675-1810. Berkeley: University of California Press, 1981; a second edition (in paperback), enlarged with a new introduction by the author and a preface by John Coatsworth, was published by Rowman and Littlefield in 2006.
- La crísis del orden colonial: Estructura agraria y rebeliones populares en la Nueva España, 1750-1821. Mexico City: Alianza Editorial, 1992.
- The Other Rebellion: Popular Violence, Ideology, and the Struggle for Mexican Independence, 1810-1821. Stanford University Press, 2001
- Writing Mexican History. Stanford, California: Stanford University Press, 2012.
- A Life Together: Lucas Alaman and Mexico, 1792-1853. Yale University Press, 2021
- Stormy Passage: Mexico from Colony to Republic (1750- 1850), Lanham, Maryland: Rowman and Littlefield, Publishers, 2022

=== Edited volumes ===
- Mexican Regions: Comparative History and Development, edited, and with an introduction. San Diego: Center for U.S.-Mexican Studies, University of California, San Diego, 1992.
- From Empire to Nation: Historical Perspectives on the Making of the Modern World, edited with Joseph Esherick and Hasan Kayali (Boulder: Rowman and Littlefield, 2006).
- Mexican Soundings: Essay in Honour of David A. Brading, co-edited with Susan Deans-Smith; London: Institute for the Study of the Americas, University of London, 2007.

=== Selected articles ===
- "Mexican Rural History Since Chevalier: The Historiography of the Colonial Hacienda," Latin American Research Review, 18 (3) 1983; 5-61.
- "Conflict and Solidarity in Indian Village Life: The Guadalajara Region in the Late Colonial Period," Hispanic American Historical Review, 64 (1984): 55-79.
- "Recent Anglophone Historiography on Mexico and Central America in the Age of Revolution (1750-1850)," Hispanic American Historical Review, 65 (1985): 725-743.
- "Millennium on the Northern Marches: The Mad Messiah of Durango and Popular Rebellion in Mexico, 1800-1815," Comparative Studies in Society and History, 28 (1986): 385-413.
- "Moving Toward Revolt: Agrarian Origins of the Hidalgo Revolt in the Guadalajara Region, 1810," in Friedrich Katz, ed., Riot, Rebellion, and Revolution: Rural Social Conflict in Mexico (Princeton: Princeton University Press, 1988) 176-204
- "Islands in the Storm: Quiet Cities and Violent Countrysides in the Mexican Independence Era," Past and Present, No. 118 (Feb., 1988), 120-156.
- "Quetzalcóatl, King Ferdinand, and Ignacio Allende Go to the Seashore; or, Messianism and Mystical Kingship in Mexico, 1800-1821," in Jaime E. Rodríguez, ed., The Independence of Mexico and the Creation of the Federal República (Los Angeles: Center for Latin American Studies, University of California at Los Angeles, 1989), 109-127.
- "Agustín Marroquín: The Sociopath as Rebel," in Judith Ewell and William Beezley, eds., The Human Tradition in Latin America: The Nineteenth Century (New York: Scholarly Resources, 1989), 17-38.
- "The Raw and the Cooked: Popular and Elite Ideology in Mexico, 1800-1821," in Mark D. Szuchman, ed., The Middle Period in Latin American History: Values and Attitudes in the 18th-19th Centuries (Boulder: Lynne Rienner Publishers, Inc., 1989), 75-102.
- "Agrarian Rebellion and Defense of Community: Meaning and Collective Violence in Late Colonial and Independence-Era Mexico," Journal of Social History, 27 (1993), 245-269.
- "The State as Vampire: Hegemonic Projects, Public Ritual, and Popular Culture in Mexico, 1600-1990," in William H. Beezley, Cheryl A. Martin, and William E. French, eds., Rituals of Rule, Rituals of Resistance: Mexican Street Culture (Wilmington, Delaware: Scholarly Resources, Inc., 1994), 343-374.
- "The Cuautla Lazarus: Double Subjectives in Reading Texts on Popular Collective Action," Colonial Latin American Review, 2 (1993), 3-26.
