= Howard F. Cline =

American historian

- Born: June 12, 1915; Detroit, Michigan
- Died: June 1, 1971 (aged 55); Washington, D.C.
- Occupation: Historian

Howard F. Cline (June 12, 1915 – June 1, 1971) was an American government official and historian, specializing in Latin America. Cline served as Director of the Hispanic Foundation at the Library of Congress from 1952 until his death in June 1971. He was one of the founders of the Latin American Studies Association. He was also active in the Conference on Latin American History (CLAH), the professional organization of Latin American historians, which he chaired in 1964. He is still highly regarded as a scholar "devoted to and effective in the promotion of Latin American studies in the United States."

== Early life and career ==
Born in Detroit, Michigan, Cline grew up in Indianapolis, Indiana. He was admitted to Harvard College on a scholarship; in his sophomore year became a resident in Dunster House, whose Master was Clarence H. Haring, later Cline's dissertation adviser. In 1939 Cline graduated magna cum laude in history, writing his senior thesis on American journalist Benjamin Orange Flower, which he later published. He was elected to Phi Beta Kappa. He won a Frederick Sheldon Fellowship, which funded travel for a year outside of the U.S. following graduation, and which he used to go to Mexico.

In 1940, Cline entered the graduate program in History at Harvard, with Clarence Haring as his adviser. He did fieldwork in a then-remote Chinantec village of San Pedro Yólox in Oaxaca in 1942–43 as a Social Science Research Fellow, which resulted in several publications. Cline's dissertation was on the Caste War (guerra de las castas). In 1947 he briefly taught at Yale and then Northwestern University from 1949 to 1952. He left academia in 1952 to become Director of the Hispanic Foundation at the Library of Congress.

== Career in government and scholarly activity ==
In 1952 Cline succeeded Lewis Hanke as director of the Hispanic foundation. Cline expanded the coverage of the Handbook of Latin American Studies, founded under Hanke's tenure at the Hispanic Foundation, with social science and humanities volumes alternating by year. Active in scholarly organizations in the U.S., he was instrumental in incorporating the Conference on Latin American History as a nonprofit corporation, scholarly organization in 1964, the year he served as chair of the organization. He was one of the founders of the Latin American Studies Association (LASA). In 1966, in his history of the Latin American Studies Association, he suggested that at some future date Latin Americanists should erect a statue to Fidel Castro, the "remote godfather" of the field, who instigated a renewed U.S. interest in the region.

Cline edited a two-volume collection of essays on the development of Latin American history as a field. He also helped create the Seminar on the Acquisition of Latin American Library Materials (SALALM).

Cline prepared research materials for the U.S. Indian Claims Commission, providing information on the history of Florida Indians and the Jicarilla Apache.

After 1960 Cline devoted time to volumes on ethnohistory for the Handbook of Middle American Indians. This publication series focuses on what is now called Mesoamerica, under the editorship of Tulane University archeologist, Robert Wauchope.

== Honors ==
Cline was awarded the Spanish government's highest honor for foreigners, Commander in the Order of Isabella the Catholic, for his work to bring Spanish and American scholarly institutions into greater cooperation. Following his early death in 1971, he was eulogized in major scholarly journals of Latin American history and in the Congressional Record. In 1972, Cline was posthumously awarded the Conference on Latin American History’s Distinguished Service Award, their highest honor. In 1976 the Howard F. Cline Prize was established and awarded biennially for the best book on Latin American ethnohistory. In 2017, the Howard F. Cline Book Prize in Mexican History was established by the Latin American Studies Association.

== Works ==
=== Monographs ===
- The United States and Mexico, Harvard University Press 1953; revised edition Atheneum 1966
- Mexico: Revolution to Evolution, Oxford University Press 1963

=== Research reports ===
- Spanish and Mexican Land Grants and the Jicarilla Apache in New Mexico, 1689-1848: A Technical Report including a list of grants, confirmed and unconfirmed and summary of data. 2 volumes, 340 pp. Maps, Bibliography. Docket 22-A, Indian Claims Commission.
- The Florida Indians, vol. 1, Notes on Colonial Indians and Communities in Florida, 1700-1821. New York: Garland Publishing 1974.

=== Edited volumes ===
- Latin American History, Essays on Its Study and Teaching, 1898-1965. 2 vols. University of Texas Press 1965.
- Guide to Ethnohistorical Sources, Handbook of Middle American Indians (HMAI). General editor. 4 vols. University of Texas Press 1972-76.
- Bernardino de Sahagún, The Conquest of New Spain (1585 revision) , translated by Howard F. Cline . Salt Lake City: University of Utah Press 1989.

=== Articles and chapters ===
- "Benjamin Orange Flower and The Arena, 1889-1909," Journalism Quarterly, vol. 17 (June 1940), pp. 139–150, 171.
- "Flower and The Arena: Purpose and Content," Journalism Quarterly, vol. 17 (Sept. 1940)
- "Lore and deities of the Lacandon Indians, Chiapas, Mexico." Journal of American Folklore 57: 107–15.
- "The terrasgueros of Guelatao, Oaxaca, Mexico: Notes on the Sierra de Juárez and its XVIIth century Indian problems." Acta Americana, 4:161-84.
- "’Aurora Yucateca’ and the Spirit of Enterprise in Yucatán, 1821-1847" Hispanic American Historical Review, vol. 27, no. 1, Feb. 1947, pp. 30–60
- "Civil Congregation of the Indians of New Spain, 1598-1606." Hispanic American Historical Review, vol. 29, (1947) no. 3, pp. 349–369
- "Mexican Community Studies". Hispanic American Historical Review 32(May 1952) 212–42.
- "Civil Congregation of the Western Chinantla, New Spain, 1599-1603." The Americas, vol. 12, no. 2, Oct 1955, pp. 115–137
- "Problems of Mexican ethno-history: the ancient Chinantla, a case study.” Hispanic American Historical Review 37(1957) 273–95.
- "The Patiño Maps of 1580 and related documents: An analysis of sixteenth century cartographic sources for the Gulf of Mexico." El Mexico Antiguo (1959) 9:633-92.
- "A Preliminary Report on Chinantec archeology: excavations in Oaxaca, Mexico, 1951." 33d International Congress of Americanists (San José 1958). Acta, 2:158-70.
- "Ethnohistory: A Progress Report on the Handbook of Middle American Indians." Hispanic American Historical Review, vol. 40, no. 2. 1960, pp. 224–229.
- "In Memoriam: Clarence Henry Haring, 1885-1960," The Americas vol. 17, no. 3. Jan. 1961, pp. 292–297
- "The Ortelius Maps of New Spain, 1579 and Related Contemporary Materials." Imago Mundi: International Journal for the History of Cartography. Vol. 16, issue 1, 1962
- "The Relaciones Geográficas of the Spanish Indies, 1577-1586.” Hispanic American Historical Review vol. 44, no. 3, Aug. 1964, pp. 341–374.
- "The Latin American Studies Association: A Summary Survey with Appendix," Latin American Research Review, Vol. 2, No. 1 (Autumn 1966) 57–79.
- "The Oztoticpac Lands Map of Texcoco, 1540." Quarterly Journal of the Library of Congress, 1966.
- "Hernando Cortés and the Aztec Indians in Spain." Quarterly Journal of the Library of Congress 1969.
- "The Chinantec". Handbook of Middle American Indians 7 (1969): 523–52, (with Roberto Weitlaner)
- "Introduction: Reflections on Ethnohistory" in Guide to Ethnohistorical Sources, Handbook of Middle American Indians (HMAI), vol. 12, 3–16.
- "Viceroyalty to Republics, 1786-1952: Historical Notes on the Evolution of Middle American Political Units", Guide to Ethnhistorical Sources HMAI, vol. 12, 138–165.
- "Ethnohistorical Regions of Middle America," Guide to Ethnohistorical Sources HMAI vol. 12, pp. 175–82.
- "Relaciones Geográficas of the Spanish Indies, 1577-1648,” Guide to Ethnohistorical Sources HMAI vol. 12, pp. 183–242.
- "A Census of the Relaciones Geográficas of New Spain, 1579-1612," Guide to Ethnohistorical Sources HMAI vol. 12, pp. 324–69.
- "The Relaciones Geográficas of Spain, New Spain, and the Spanish Indies: An Annotated Bibliography," Guide to Ethnohistorical Sources, HMAI vol. 12, pp. 370–395.
- "Sahagún and His Works" (with Nicolau d’Olwer), Guide to Ethnohistorical Sources, HMAI, vol. 13, pp. 186–206
- "Sahagún Materials and Studies", Guide to Ethnohistorical Sources HMAI, vol. 13, pp. 218–239.
- "Hubert Howe Bancroft, 1832-1918,” Guide to Ethnohistorical Sources HMAI, vol. 13, pp. 326–347.
- "Selected Nineteenth-Century Mexican Writers on Ethnohistory," Guide to Ethnohistorical Sources, HMAI, vol. 13, pp. 370–422.
- "The Chronology of the Conquest: Syncronologies in Codex Telleriano-Remensis and Sahagún." Journal de la Societé des Americanistes 1973.
