= Friedrich Katz =

Austrian historian (1927–2010)

- Born: 13 June 1927; Vienna, First Austrian Republic
- Died: 16 October 2010 (aged 83); Philadelphia, Pennsylvania, U.S.
- Citizenship: Austria
- Education: Wagner College; University of Vienna (1954); Humboldt University of Berlin (1962)
- Awards: Beveridge Award (1999); Bolton Prize (1999)
- Scientific career
- Fields: 19th and 20th century history of Mexico and Latin America
- Workplaces: University of Chicago
- Notable students: Javier Garciadiego Andrés_Reséndez

Friedrich Katz (13 June 1927 – 16 October 2010) was an Austrian historian and anthropologist who specialized in 19th- and 20th-century history of Mexico, particularly in the Mexican Revolution.

"He was arguably Mexico's most widely regarded historian... The whole of the Mexican press, left, right and center, noted and lamented his passing."

He studied at the French high school of Mexico City, at the ENAH in Mexico and in the US, completed his PhD in Vienna, then worked in at the Humboldt University of Berlin, before moving to the US in 1970. He eventually served as co-director of the Mexican Studies Program at the University of Chicago.

== Biography ==
Katz was born in Vienna, Austria, into a Jewish family led by Leo Katz and Bronia Rein that eventually escaped from Nazi persecution. After failing to settle in France and in the United States, due to the Communist affiliation of his father (and specifically his role as an arms buyer for Republican Spain), Katz's family moved to Mexico, where he arrived at the age of 13 and completed his basic studies. He obtained his baccalaureate from the Liceo Franco Mexicano in 1945. He began his bachelor's degree studies at the National School of Anthropology and History (ENAH), which he eventually completed at Wagner College in the United States. Katz returned to Austria to complete a doctorate degree at the University of Vienna in 1954 and moved to East Germany to attain habilitation at the Humboldt University of Berlin in 1962. As a university professor, he returned to Mexico to serve as a visiting scholar at the National Autonomous University of Mexico (UNAM, 1968–69) and a year later he joined the University of Texas at Austin. In 1971 he joined the University of Chicago where, eventually, he was appointed the Morton D. Hull Distinguished Service Professor Emeritus of Latin American History.

On his 80th birthday, two university colloquia were organized in Katz's honor by the University of Chicago and El Colegio de México. He died on 16 October 2010 in Philadelphia.

He is survived by his wife, his two children, Leo Katz and Jacqueline Ross, law professors at the University of Pennsylvania and the University of Illinois Urbana-Champaign respectively, and his four grandchildren.

== Honours ==
co-received the 1999 Bolton Prize (nowadays Bolton-Johnson Prize) for the best English-language book on Latin American History by the Conference on Latin American History, and was honored with the Order of the Aztec Eagle by the Government of Mexico. He also won the 2000 Bryce Wood Book Award presented by the Latin American Studies Association (LASA) for outstanding English-language book in the humanities and social sciences for his 1 000-page book The Life and Times of Pancho Villa. The American Historical Association has created a book prize in honor of Friedrich Katz.

== Works ==
- Katz, Friedrich (1981). The Secret War in Mexico: Europe, the United States, and the Mexican Revolution. Chicago: University of Chicago Press. ISBN 978-0-226-42588-7. OCLC 6942429. online
- Ensayos mexicanos (1994). Alianza Editorial, Mexico City.
- Ancient American Civilizations (1969, 1997), London.
- The Life and Times of Pancho Villa (1998), Stanford University Press.
- Nuevos ensayos mexicanos (2006).
- "Pancho Villa and the Attack on Columbus, New Mexico" (1978)

• "Situación social y económica de los aztecas durante los siglos XV y XVI" (Mexico: Universidad Nacional Autónoma de México, 1966)

=== Further reading ===
- Andreas W. Daum, "Refugees from Nazi Germany as Historians: Origins and Migrations, Interests and Identities", in The Second Generation: Émigrés from Nazi Germany as Historians. With a Biobibliographic Guide, ed. Andreas Daum, Hartmut Lehmann, James J. Sheehan. New York: Berghahn Books, 2016, pp. 1‒52.
- Lomnitz, Claudio. "On the Improbable Popularity of Friedrich Katz". Mexican Studies / Estudios Mexicanos, vol. 27, 1, Winter 2011, pp. 233–39.
