= Charles Gibson (historian) =

American historian (1920–1985)

- Born: August 12, 1920
- Died: August 22, 1985 (aged 65); Keeseville, New York, United States
- Occupation: Ethnohistorian

Charles Gibson (August 12, 1920 – August 22, 1985) was an American ethnohistorian who wrote foundational works on the Nahua peoples of colonial Mexico and was elected President of the American Historical Association in 1977.

He studied history at Yale University with George Kubler, and he taught for a number of years at the University of Iowa before moving to the University of Michigan. His dissertation on the Nahua polity of Tlaxcala (published in 1952 as Tlaxcala in the Sixteenth Century), a key ally of the Spaniards in the conquest of Mexico, was the first major study of conquest and the early colonial era Nahuas from the indigenous perspective. It remains a model for scholars working on Mesoamerican ethnohistory.

He also contributed to the creation of important bibliographic guides to works in Mexican history, such as the Handbook of Latin American Studies and Mesoamerican ethnohistory as well as an index to the journal Hispanic American Historical Review. The culmination of his work on colonial-era Nahuas is The Aztecs Under Spanish Rule: A History of the Indians of the Valley of Mexico, 1519–1810 (1964), which "reordered the research priorities for a generation of colonial historians."

== Works ==
- Tlaxcala in the Sixteenth Century, New Haven: Yale University Press 1952.
- The Aztecs Under Spanish Rule: A History of the Indians of the Valley of Mexico, 1519–1810. Stanford: Stanford University Press, 1964.
- Spain in America New York: Harper & Row, 1966.
- The Spanish Tradition in America. New York: Harper & Row. 1968.
- Attitudes of colonial powers toward the American Indian, (with Howard Peckham, editors). Salt Lake City: University of Utah Press, 1969.
- The Inca Concept of Sovereignty and the Spanish Administration of Peru Austin: University of Texas Press 1948. Republished, New York: Greenwood Press, 1969.
- The Colonial Period in Latin American History. 2nd. ed. Washington: American Historical Association, 1970, 1968.
- The Black Legend: Anti-Spanish Attitudes in the Old World and the New. New York: Knopf, 1971.
- The Tovar Calendar: an illustrated Mexican Manuscript ca. 1585. Reproduced, with a commentary and handlist of sources on the Mexican 365-day year (with George Kubler). New Haven: The Academy, 1951.
- Guide to the Hispanic American Historical Review, 1946–1955 (with Victor Niemayer). Durham, NC: Duke University Press 1958. New York: Kraus Reprint Co. 1976.
- "Published Collections of Documents Relating to Middle America Ethnohistory, Handbook of Middle American Indians, volume 13, Guide to Ethnohistorical Sources, Part 2, edited by Howard F. Cline. Austin: University of Texas Press, 1973, pp. 3–42.
- "Conquest, Capitulation, and Indian Treaties," (American Historical Association Presidential Address). American Historical Review 83, no. 1, February 1978, pp. 1–15.
