= Jaime Rodríguez (disambiguation) =

Jaime Rodríguez (1959–2025) was a Salvadoran football player.

Jaime Rodríguez may also refer to:

- Jaime Rodríguez Calderón ("El Bronco", born 1957), Mexican politician, governor of Nuevo León and 2018 presidential candidate
- Jaime Rodríguez Espoz (born 1937), Chilean lawyer and justice of the Supreme Court
- Jaime Rodríguez Inurrigarro, Mexican politician, elected for the 4th federal electoral district of Tamaulipas in 1988
- Jaime Rodríguez López (born 1955), Mexican politician from Michoacán
- Jaime Rodríguez Salazar (born 1932), Mexican prelate of the Roman Catholic Church, bishop of Huánuco in 2004–2016
- Jaime Rodríguez Villanueva (born 1951), Peruvian politician, governor of Moquegua in 2007–2010 and 2015–2018
- Jaime E. Rodríguez O. (1940–2022), Ecuadorian historian, professor emeritus at the University of California, Irvine

== See also ==
- Jaime Rodrigues (born 1955), Mozambican sprinter
- James Rodríguez (disambiguation)
