= Ronaldo Munck =

Argentine sociologist (born 1951)

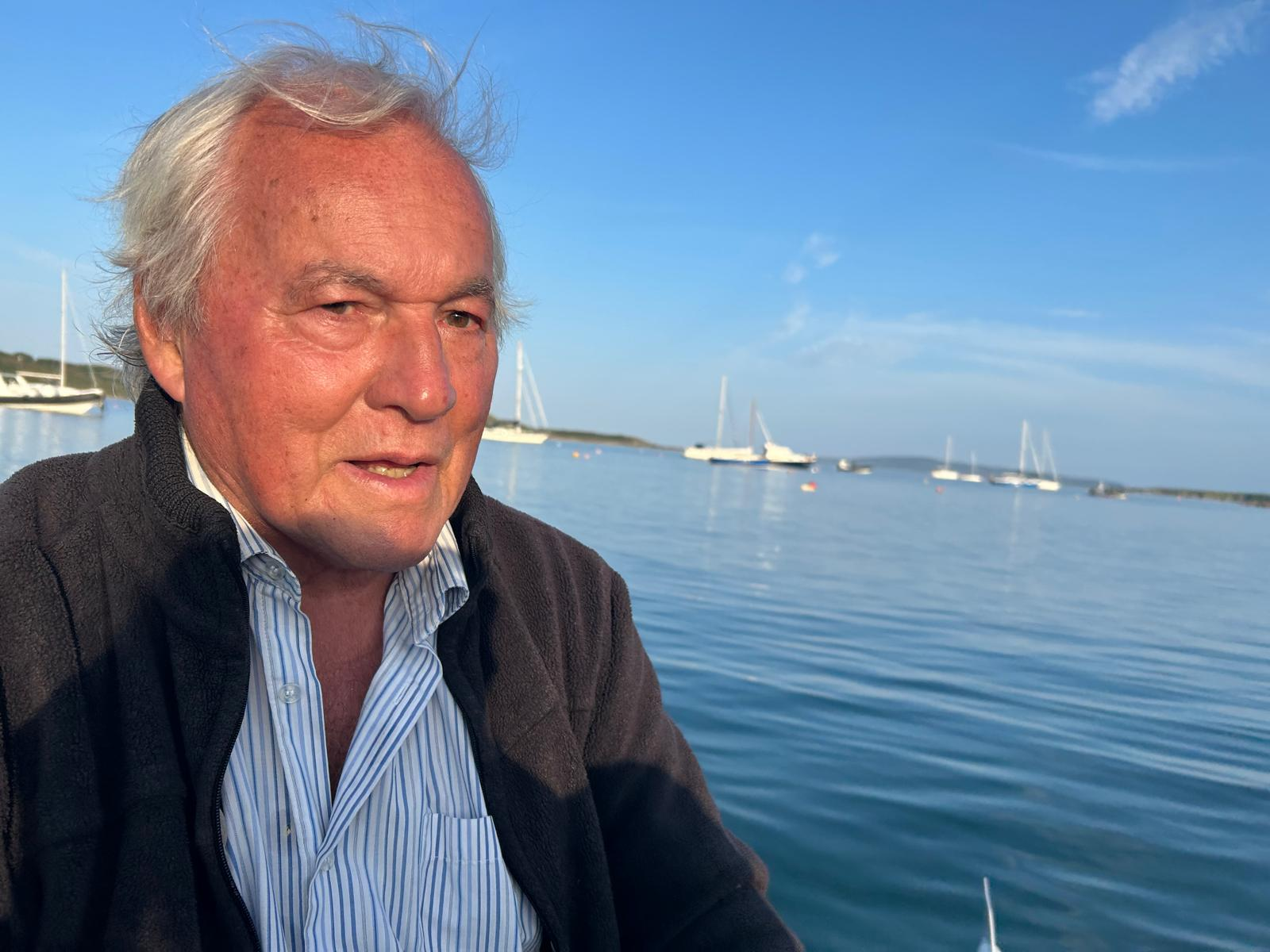
- Born: 1951 (age 74–75); Buenos Aires, Argentina
- Education: University of Essex
- Occupations: Professor, sociology
- Scientific career
- Institutions: Ulster University; University of Durban-Westville; University of Liverpool; Dublin City University

Ronaldo Munck is an Argentine sociologist, living in Ireland since 1976,who has worked on the political sociology and globalisation of labour and Latin America.

== Biography ==
Ronaldo Munck was born and educated in Argentina. He completed his PhD in political sociology at the University of Essex in 1976 under the supervision of Ernesto Laclau.

He was Senior Lecturer in Sociology, University of Ulster (1984-1988), Reader in Sociology, University of Ulster (1988-1994), Professor of Sociology and Head of department, University of Durban (1994-1996), Professor of Political Sociology, University of Liverpool and Director, Globalisation and Social Exclusion Unit (1996-2004), and Head of Civic Engagement, President's Office, Dublin City University (2004 to 2024).

== Academic career ==
Munck began his academic career as an assistant lecturer in sociology at the University of Essex (1975–1976). He subsequently joined the University of Ulster in 1977, where he served as lecturer, senior lecturer, and later reader in sociology.

From 1994 to 1996 he was Professor of Sociology and Head of Department at the University of Durban-Westville in South Africa during the country's democratic transition.

In 1996 he was appointed Professor of Political Sociology at the University of Liverpool, where he founded and directed the Globalisation and Social Exclusion Unit.

In 2004 Munck joined Dublin City University (DCU), where he became the founding Head of Civic Engagement in the President's Office. He later served as Director of the Centre for Engaged Research and Professor of Sociology (2021–2023). He is Professor Emeritus of Sociology and Civic Engagement at DCU.

He has also held visiting and honorary appointments at institutions including University of Buenos Aires, University of Girona, St. Mary's University, Nova Scotia, University of Liverpool, University of Würzburg-Schweinfurt and Universidad Técnica Particular de Loja.

== Research and intellectual contributions ==
Munck's research has developed across several interconnected fields, spanning labour studies, globalization, development theory, migration, Latin American studies, and civic engagement. Across these areas, his work has consistently sought to connect political economy with social transformation, often drawing on Marxist, Gramscian, and Polanyian traditions while foregrounding perspectives from the Global South.

=== Labour studies and globalization ===
Munck is widely associated with the development of the "new international labour studies," a field that challenged nationally bounded approaches to labour and emphasized the transnational dimensions of work, class formation, and workers' struggles. His scholarship has sought to move beyond methodological nationalism by examining labour within global processes of capitalist restructuring, migration, and neoliberal transformation.

His early book The New International Labour Studies (1988) helped establish comparative labour studies from a global perspective and encouraged a shift toward analysing labour "from below."

Later works, including Labour and Globalisation: A New Great Transformation? (2002) and Rethinking Global Labour: After Neoliberalism (2018), drew on Karl Polanyi's theory of the "great transformation" to explore the consequences of neoliberal globalization for workers and labour movements. Across this body of work, Munck has addressed trade unions, precarious labour, informalization, migration, and the changing nature of work in the global economy.

=== Latin American studies ===
Latin America has remained a central focus throughout Munck's intellectual career. His early scholarship engaged with dependency theory, state formation, democratization, and labour movements in the region. Beginning with Politics and Dependency in the Third World: The Case of Latin America (1984), he explored the structural constraints of dependent development and their political consequences.

Subsequent works such as Latin America: The Transition to Democracy (1989), the widely used textbook Contemporary Latin America (published in several editions), and Rethinking Latin America: Development, Hegemony and Social Transformation (2013) reflected a sustained engagement with changing political and economic realities in the region. His approach frequently employs Gramscian concepts of hegemony and counter-hegemony to analyse social movements, progressive governments, and alternatives to neoliberal development.

=== Development theory ===
Munck has made significant contributions to critical development studies, advocating approaches that move beyond modernization theory and orthodox neoliberal paradigms. His work emphasizes historical analysis, uneven and combined development, and the importance of agency and social struggle in processes of transformation.

His contributions include Critical Development Theory: Contributions to a New Paradigm (1999), Water and Development: Good Governance after Neoliberalism (2015), and Rethinking Development: Marxist Perspectives (2021). Throughout these works, he has argued for a renewed dialogue between Marxism and development studies while foregrounding alternatives emerging from the Global South.

=== Migration studies ===
Migration has been another major strand of Munck's research. His work examines migration not simply as population movement but as a constitutive feature of globalization, labour markets, and social transformation. He has written extensively on the relationships between migration and trade unions, migrant integration, informal labour markets, South–North migration, and transnational citizenship.

His book Globalisation and Migration: New Conflicts, New Politics (2008) is widely regarded as an important contribution to migration studies. Across his writings, Munck has emphasized migrants' agency and the need to connect migration research to broader questions of labour rights, citizenship, and global inequality.

=== Civic engagement ===
During his tenure at Dublin City University, Munck became a prominent advocate of civic engagement in higher education and the concept of the "engaged university." As founding Head of Civic Engagement, he played a central role in developing institutional frameworks linking universities with communities, civil society organizations, and public institutions.

He served as founding chair of Campus Engage in Ireland and contributed internationally to debates on engaged research, community-based learning, and the social responsibilities of universities. His work in this area sought to reposition higher education as an active participant in democratic and social transformation.

=== Public engagement ===
Munck has frequently been characterized as a public intellectual whose scholarship combines academic research with civic and political engagement. His writings draw on Marxism, dependency theory, Gramscian analysis, and Polanyian political economy while remaining attentive to contemporary global challenges.

== Editorial and professional activities ==
Munck has served on the editorial boards of numerous international academic journals, including Globalizations, Global Social Policy, Global Discourse, Labour History, Global Labour Journal, Labour, Capital and Society, Latin American Perspectives, Review: A Journal of the Fernand Braudel Center, and the Canadian Journal of Development Studies. Through these roles he has contributed to shaping scholarly debates in sociology, development studies, labour studies, and globalization research.

He has also been active in a range of professional associations and learned societies, including the International Sociological Association, the Development Studies Association, the Society of Latin American Studies, the Global Studies Association, and the Migration and Development International Network. Beyond academia, he has served on numerous public bodies and civil society organizations in Ireland and internationally, reflecting his longstanding commitment to engaged scholarship and public service.

== Selected works ==
=== Books ===
- Munck, Ronaldo (1984). Politics and Dependency in the Third World: The Case of Latin America. Ulster Polytechnic. ISBN 978-0-86232-165-9.
- Munck, Ronaldo; Falcón, Ricardo; Galitelli, Bernardo (1987). Argentina: From Anarchism to Peronism : Workers, Unions and Politics, 1855-1985. Zed Books. ISBN 978-0-86232-570-1.
- Munck, Ronaldo (1988). The New International Labour Studies: An Introduction. Zed Books. ISBN 978-0-86232-586-2.
- Munck, Ronaldo (2003). Contemporary Latin America. Internet Archive. Houndmills, Basingstoke, Hampshire ; New York : Palgrave Macmillan. ISBN 978-0-333-98090-3.
- Munck, Ronaldo (2002). Globalisation and Labour: The New 'Great Transformation'. Zed Books. ISBN 978-1-84277-071-9.
- "Globalization and Social Exclusion : A Transformationalist Perspective [1 ed.] 9781565496170, 9781565491939". dokumen.pub.
- Munck, Ronaldo (8 December 2006). Globalization and Contestation: The New Great Counter-Movement. Routledge. ISBN 978-1-134-22347-3.
- "Globalisation and Migration: New Issues, New Politics". Routledge & CRC Press.
- Munck, Ronaldo (2013). Rethinking Latin America : development, hegemony, and social transformation. Internet Archive. New York, NY : Palgrave Macmillan. ISBN 978-1-137-00411-6.
- Water and Development.
- Munck, Ronaldo (27 February 2025). Global Futures: Key Concepts for Social Transformation. Taylor & Francis. ISBN 978-1-040-32978-8.
- Munck, Ronaldo (2024). Coloniality of Power and Progressive Politics in Latin America. Springer. ISBN 978-3031543333.
