= Roderic Ai Camp =

American academic

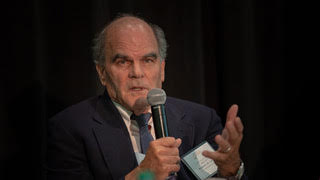
- Born: 1945 (age 80–81); Colfax, Washington, United States
- Education: George Washington University and University of Arizona.
- Scientific career
- Fields: Mexican studies
- Workplaces: Claremont McKenna College

Roderic Ai Camp (born 1945) is an American academic specialized in Mexican studies. He is a frequent consultant to international media including the BBC, The New York Times, The Wall Street Journal, National Public Radio, and was once a contributing editor to Microsoft Encarta.

He has briefed several institutions, including the United States House of Representatives, the U.S. Senate Committee on Foreign Relations, and at least five U.S. ambassadors to Mexico for the U.S. Department of State as well as the Department of Defense, War and Naval Colleges in the United States and in Mexico. Currently, he is the Philip McKenna Professor of the Pacific Rim at Claremont McKenna College, in California, United States.

He has also served as a consultant to major international media outlets and has received the Order of the Aztec Eagle, the highest distinction awarded by the Mexican government to a foreign national. He has interviewed eight Mexican Presidents serving from 1932 to 2012.

== Biography ==
Camp was born in Colfax, Washington, to Ortho O. Camp, a small businessman, and Helen Camp, a counselor. He and his wife, librarian Emily Ellen Morse married October 1, 1966. They have two children: Christopher and Alexander.

Camp graduated with both a bachelor's degree (1963–66) and a master's degree in International Affairs (1966–67) from George Washington University and completed a doctorate degree in Comparative Politics and History at the University of Arizona (1967–70). He tracks his interest in Mexican topics back to his years growing up among Mexican immigrants in Orange, a small citrus farming community outside Los Angeles.

In recognition of his scholarly contributions, he was awarded an honorary Doctorate in Humane Letters from St. Olaf College in 2009. During the early phase of his career, he also served in the United States Marine Corps Reserve (1970–1976), attaining the rank of sergeant.

== Career ==
Camp's academic career at Central College in Iowa where he held multiple roles from 1970 to 1991, including assistant professor, associate professor, and full professor of political science. He also served in numerous administrative capacities, such as department chair, director of Latin American Studies, and assistant academic dean. During this period, he developed a strong foundation in Latin American political research and established study abroad and cross-cultural academic programs.

In 1991, Camp joined Tulane University as professor of political science and a faculty member at the Roger Thayer Stone Center for Latin American Studies. He later served as chair of the political science department (1993–1996) and directed the Tinker Mexican Policy Studies Program. His work during this time further solidified his reputation as a leading expert on Mexican governance and elite politics.

In 1998, he moved to Claremont McKenna College, where he was appointed Philip McKenna Professor of the Pacific Rim, a position he held until 2020, before becoming Professor Emeritus. At Claremont, he also served as chair of the Government Department (2013–2015) and contributed to the college’s emphasis on international and policy-oriented education. Beyond academia, Camp has held influential roles in policy and research institutions, including Senior Associate at the Center for Strategic and International Studies (1998–2007) and elected member of the Council on Foreign Relations (2005–2020). He has also been affiliated with the Woodrow Wilson International Center for Scholars as a fellow and as a founding board member of its Mexico Institute.

== Awards ==
In July 2017, he received the Order of the Aztec Eagle, awarded by the Government of Mexico. In the official decree, President Enrique Peña Nieto cited his contributions to Mexican studies, highlighting his “remarkable interest in Mexico,” particularly as demonstrated in his book Mexican Political Biographies, 1935–1975 (University of Arizona Press, 1976), described as the first comprehensive biographical work on contemporary Mexican political figures and a model for later official government directories. Peña Nieto further stated that he is “one of the most important promoters of Mexican culture in the United States of America,” whose extensive knowledge has made him a recognized international scholar.

In the same year, he was named a Global Scholar at the Woodrow Wilson International Center for Scholars at the Smithsonian Institution. He later received the Crevenna-Sadler Award for Outstanding Service from the Rocky Mountain Council for Latin American Studies in 2018, as well as the Outstanding Scholarship Award (2017) from Claremont McKenna College, where he was its first recipient. His service to the institution was further recognized with the Roy P. Crocker Award for Service in 2005 and 2015. Earlier in his career, he received the Excellence in Undergraduate Teaching Award (1997) from Tulane University.

== Research and scholarly contributions ==
Camp’s research centers on the study of political elites, leadership recruitment, and institutional power in Mexico, with a distinctive methodological emphasis on prosopography the systematic analysis of collective biographies to understand how individuals enter, navigate, and sustain positions of authority. His work spans multiple elite sectors, including political, intellectual, military, business, and religious institutions, offering a comprehensive and empirically grounded understanding of Mexico’s power structure.

A major contribution of his scholarship is his analysis of Mexico’s transition from a one-party dominant system led by the Institutional Revolutionary Party (PRI) to a more competitive democratic order, highlighting how elite continuity and gradual transformation shape democratization processes within deeply embedded institutional cultures. In addition, his research addresses voting behavior, political culture, and the evolving role of media and communication, particularly the growing influence of platforms such as Facebook and Twitter in shaping contemporary electoral dynamics.

Alongside his theoretical and empirical contributions, Camp has produced an extensive body of scholarly work, authoring and editing more than books and numerous academic articles. His most influential publications include Politics in Mexico: The Path of a New Democracy (2020), which examines Mexico’s democratic development, and Mexico: What Everyone Needs to Know (2017), an accessible yet authoritative overview of Mexican politics and society. He also edited The Oxford Handbook of Mexican Politics (2012), a major reference volume that consolidates leading research in the field.

Earlier works such as Mexican Political Biographies, 1935–2009 (2011) and The Metamorphosis of Leadership in a Democratic Mexico (2010) exemplify his focus on elite analysis and leadership change. Many of his publications have been recognized as “Outstanding Academic Books” by Choice, and beyond his books, he has contributed to encyclopedias, edited collections, and leading academic journals, while serving on editorial boards including Mexican Studies and the Oxford Research Encyclopedia of Latin America.

Camp has a substantial scholarly impact, with Google Scholar reporting 6,748 citations to his work as of January 2026, including 1,022 citations between 2022 and 2025.

== Selected publications ==
Camp has written more than thirty books, most of them on topics related to Mexico. Eight of them have received "Outstanding" designations by Choice magazine, a publication of the Association of College & Research Libraries (ACRL) of the American Library Association.

- The Role of Economists in Policy Making: A Comparative Study of Mexico and the United States (University of Arizona Press, 1977)
- Mexico's Leaders, Their Education and Recruitment (University of Arizona Press, 1980).
- The Making of a Government: The Socialization of Political Leaders in Post-Revolutionary Mexico (University of Arizona Press, 1984). Winner of the "Choice Outstanding Academic Book, 1985".
- Intellectuals and the State in Twentieth Century Mexico (University of Texas Press, 1985). Winner of the "Choice Outstanding Academic Book, 1986".
- Mexico's Political Stability, the Next Five Years (Editor, Westview Press, 1986).
- Memoirs of a Mexican Politician (University of New Mexico Press, 1988).
- Entrepreneurs and Politics in Twentieth Century Mexico (Oxford University Press, 1989).
- Mexican Political Biographies, 1884–1935 (University of Texas Press, 1991).
- Generals in the Palacio, the Military in Modern Mexico (Oxford University Press, 1992).
- Who's Who in Mexico Today (Westview Press, 1993). Winner of the "Choice Outstanding Reference Book, 1988".
- Politics in Mexico, the Democratic Consolidation (Oxford University Press, 2007). Winner of the "Choice Outstanding Academic Book, 1993" and recommended in the Council on Foreign Relations Reading List on Mexican Politics blog by Shannon O'Neil, August 18, 2009.
- The Successor, A Political Thriller (University of New Mexico Press, 1993).
- Mexican Political Biographies, 1935–1993 (University of Texas Press, 1995). Winner of the "American Reference Book Annual Outstanding Reference Book" and "Choice Outstanding Academic Book".
- Political Recruitment Across Two Centuries, Mexico, 1884-1999 (University of Texas Press, 1995).
- Crossing Swords, Politics and Religion in Mexico (Oxford University Press, 1997).
- Editor, Citizen Views of Democracy in Latin America (University of Pittsburgh Press, 2001).
- Mexico's Mandarins, Crafting a Power Elite for the 21st Century (University of California Press, 2002).
- Mexico's Military on the Democratic Stage (Center for Strategic & International Studies/Praeger, 2005).
- Politics in Mexico, The Democratic Consolidation (Oxford University Press, 2007).
- The Metamorphosis of Leadership in a Democratic Mexico (Oxford University Press, 2010).
- Mexico, What Everyone Needs to Know (Oxford University Press, 2011).
- Mexican Political Biographies, 1939–2009 4th ed. (University of Texas Press, 2011) Winner of the "Choice Outstanding Academic Book, 2011"
- Oxford Handbook of Mexican Politics (Oxford University Press, 2012).
- Politics in Mexico, Democratic Consolidation or Decline? (Oxford University Press, 2013).
- Mexico, What Everyone Needs to Know" 2nd ed. (Oxford University Press, 2017).
- Politics in Mexico, The Path of a New Democracy (Oxford University Press, 2019).
