= Vera Mae Green =

American anthropologist and academic

- Born: September 6, 1928; Chicago, Illinois
- Died: January 17, 1982 (aged 53); Plainsboro Township, New Jersey
- Occupations: Anthropologist; scholar; educator; author
- Known for: First African-American Caribbeanist; First President of the Association of Black Anthropologists
- Notable work: Migrants in Aruba: Interethnic Integration

Vera Mae Green (September 6, 1928 – January 17, 1982) was an American anthropologist, educator, and scholar, who made major contributions in the fields of Caribbean studies, interethnic studies, black family studies and the study of poverty and the poor. She was one of the first African-American Caribbeanists and the first to focus on Dutch Caribbean culture. She developed a "methodology for the study of African American Anthropology" that acknowledged the diversity among and within black families, communities and cultures. Her other areas of research included mestizos in Mexico and communities in India and Israel. "[C]ommitted to the betterment of the human condition", Green also focused her efforts toward international human rights.

== Early life and education ==
Vera Mae Green was born on September 6, 1928, in Chicago, Illinois, where she lived in poor urban areas and attended the city's public schools. She was an only child and an avid reader. Having developed an interest in anthropology at an early age, as a child she drew distinctions between the portrayal of Native Americans in Hollywood films and the actual Native American peoples and their cultures. Consequently, sometimes her friends avoided sitting next to her when watching films because they thought she might spoil the show.

Green's academic pursuits sometimes were delayed because of her lack of finances. However, she maintained an interest in social science. After receiving a scholarship, she went on to study sociology and psychology at William Penn College in Oskaloosa, Iowa. In 1952, she earned a B.A. in sociology from Roosevelt University, where she studied under anthropologist St. Clair Drake and sociologist and newspaper columnist Horace R. Cayton Jr., the co-authors of the seminal book Black Metropolis: A Study of Negro Life in a Northern City. "Drake encouraged Green to seek graduate study in the social sciences, but her lack of finances eliminated that possibility."

Prior to moving to New York City for graduate studies, she held several positions at various social welfare agencies in Chicago. While her work in direct services with some of the city's vulnerable populations was rewarding, she found it necessary to continue her studies. She enrolled in Columbia University. Under the direction of anthropologists Charles Wagley and Eleanor Padilla, Green studied the "relationship among social stress, health, and disease" in the East Harlem neighborhood of New York City. While at Columbia University, she also studied under Native American anthropologist Gene Weltfish, who was investigated during the McCarthy era. Amidst controversy, Green supported efforts to help Weltfish keep her position at Columbia University. Weltfish's position was terminated. "Standing up for Weltfish caused [Green] acceptance into Columbia University's doctoral program." But, she and Weltfish became friends.

In 1955, Green earned a Master of Arts degree in anthropology, from Columbia University. In 1969, she earned her Ph.D. from the University of Arizona. In 1980, the number of African Americans with master's or Ph.D. degrees in anthropology was below 100. Green was one of them.

== Career ==
Applied and social anthropologist Vera Mae Green made significant contributions to Caribbean studies, interethnic studies, black family studies and the study of poverty and the poor.

Prior to earning her master's in anthropology, Green held various social services positions in her hometown, Chicago. She worked as a "group worker, social welfare aide, [...] child welfare worker" and, in the city's housing authority, as "a community tenant-relations aide and social worker". After earning a Master of Arts in anthropology from Columbia University, Green returned to providing direct services to marginalized communities but, this time, her focus included international community development. In 1956, she worked with the United Nations in a community of mestizos in Mexico. For this, she became a "Fundamental Educator" with the United Nations Educational, Scientific and Cultural Organization (UNESCO). While in this role, she also focused on community development in India.

Green's personal experience, professional work on poverty and field work in East Harlem with Wagley and Padilla made her an ideal researcher for anthropologist Oscar Lewis's study of a poor urban area in Puerto Rico and in New York. In 1963, Green "served as one of Lewis's research assistants". Her "field notes from that project became Lewis' [book]", La Vida: A Puerto Rican Family in the Culture of Poverty—San Juan and New York. In 1967, Lewis won the National Book Award in Science, Philosophy and Religion for La Vida. After her experience on the project and with encouragement from Lewis, Green entered a doctoral program at the University of Arizona in Tucson, Arizona, where she earned a Ph.D. in anthropology.

Green's doctoral fieldwork was carried out on the Caribbean island of Aruba. Her dissertation, Aspects of Interethnic Integration in Aruba, Netherlands Antilles, was done under the direction of anthropologist Edward H. Spicer, who also provided a way for Green to enter the university's doctorate program. Anthropologist St. Clair Drake described Green's anthropological work in the Netherlands Antilles as groundbreaking. Drake explained that her work marked a turning point for black students who wished to do research on non-black groups. Previously, black students were "discouraged by their professors who would very likely to have used the argument that it 'wouldn't lead anywhere'. In some cases, they would have thought that blacks would not be accepted in the field by either 'natives' or their 'colonial overlords'. Green chose to research issues surrounding the social structure in the Dutch-controlled island of Aruba. There were very few West Indian anthropologists of color either, graduate students from the islands preferred fields like economics, political science, history, and the classics. When Green chose the Dutch Caribbean, it put her into the category of the unusual". She was the first African-American Caribbeanist.

A Caribbeanist is a scholar who focuses on the "Caribbean region in the Americas". In some academic institutions, Caribbean studies are often a part of Latin American studies programs. The first African-American Caribbeanist, and the only African-American Caribbeanist, during most of the 1960s, Green was known for "her study of family and ethnic relations in the Dutch Antilles and the United States". She served as "supervising anthropologist for a research project in Aruba" and, in 1974, she published a book, Migrants in Aruba, which is based on her dissertation. Her other post-doctoral publications on topics involving the Caribbean included "Methodological Problems Involved in the Study of Aruban Family", which was presented during the Second Conference on Family in the Caribbean in 1973, "Racial vs. Ethnic Factors in Afro-American and Afro-Caribbean Migration", which was published in Migration, Change and Development: Implications for Ethnic Diversity and Political Conflict in 1975 and "Dominica in Political Parties of the Americas", published in 1982.

Determined "to foster the growth and development of a methodology for the study of Afro-American anthropology", throughout her career, she insisted on the acknowledgment of diversity among and within black families, communities and culture and proposed methods for studying black communities. She published several articles during the 1970s, including "The Confrontation of Diversity Within the Black Community", in which she documents "unification and polarizing influences" within the community. In the article, Green explained that "While in recent years Blacks have tended to become more unified at one level, there are indications that there are polarizing influences operating at another level. This influence may be felt in the differential use of the terms Negro and Black by certain of the more verbal segments of the population. The former is utilized to denote the 'Uncle Toms,' or integrationist individuals of African descent, while the latter term is used to denote those who have undergone a 'rebirth' in terms of Black pride. The 'Toms' are often derogatorily referred to as 'middle class,' and in contrast, there is a glorification of 'our roots,' which by implication means the lower classes and the folk families. Implicit in this new usage is the accompanying idea that all persons of African descent were unaware of their history and sought escape from any form of 'Negro' connection. As a result, the stage is being set for a confrontation of diversity among persons of African descent within the United States".

In 1978, Green's article "The Black Extended Family: Some Research Suggestions" was published in Extended Family in Black Societies which was edited by Edith M. Shimkin and Dennis A. Frate. The article examined the limitations and contributions of two studies: (1) one conducted by Demitri B. Shimkin, Gloria J. Louie and Dennis Frate and (2) a second study conducted by Jack Jr. In her article, Green asserted that while the data presented in the studies could have "potentially increase[d] the understanding of [U.S.] Black families in academic and administrative circles", it did not go far enough. She explained that the Shimkin, et al. and Jack studies focused primarily on "kinship ties", "adult adoption" and "fictive kin" in black families but missed the importance of nonkin and nonkin household units. The Shimkin, et al., and Jack studies also focused on "one type of extended family in the South" and as in other research on black American families, not enough attention was given to cultural ecology, ethnolinguistics (in this case the way the black families defined and perceived "weakness" and "strength") and situational factors, like cultural overlapping and cultural division among families.

Over the course of her career, she also focused on the diversity of poverty, migrants and human rights. In 1980, International Human Rights: Contemporary Issues, a book Green co-edited with Jack L. Nelson, was released. In the introduction of the book, Nelson and Green proposed that nations come to a consensus on what are human rights. They explained that in "effort to have rhetoric and principles of political leaders, including political leaders in the United States, reflected in the actions, a worldwide agreement on the definition, characteristics, and example of human rights that would lead to appropriate development, monitoring and enforcement. Lack of intention consensus is the problem with human rights".

As an educator, her "work on poverty, immigration, and poor and disenfranchised people of color, particularly those of African descent, was a mainstay in the classroom". Green taught at various universities, including the University of Iowa in 1969, and the University of Houston from 1969 to 1972. In 1972, she joined the faculty at Rutgers University, where she was appointed "graduate advisor and chair of the Department of Anthropology" and "chair of the undergraduate division of the department at Livingston College". From 1976 to 1982 she was the director of the Latin American Institute at Rutgers, which offered undergraduate and graduate certificate programs. With her "extensive network", Green attracted influential scholars and politicians, who gave lectures at the institute.

Green served on the Executive Council of the American Anthropological Association. One of the founders of the Association of Black Anthropologists, she also served as the association's first president, sometimes hosting meetings in her home. She also took on the role of "convener to Quaker anthropologists".

She was fluent in Spanish, French, Urdu, Tamil, Dutch, German and Papiamento.

== Religion ==
A member of the 57th Street Meeting of Friends, Green was an unprogrammed Quaker who lent her expertise to support the mission of her faith. In 1973, at the request of the Religious Society of Friends, Green conducted a study to find out why black people were not joining the organization and what the organization could have done to attract black members. Green revealed her findings at a Friends General Conference meeting in June 1973 and distributed them in a report titled, "Blacks and Quakerism: A Preliminary Report". She found that some did not know about or knew very little about Quakerism. She also found that some of the religion's ideology like "lack of ceremony" and "understanding of humanity" appealed to black people while others like "patience" and "passivity" did not. Green also contributed to the anthology Black Fire: African American Quaker on Spirituality and Human Rights.

== Affiliations ==
- Institute for Advanced Study at Princeton (1981–1982)
- American Anthropological Association
- Association of Black Anthropologists
- Mid-Atlantic Council of Latin American Studies

== Death and legacy ==
A resident of New Brunswick, New Jersey, Green died at Princeton Medical Center on January 17, 1982.

In 1980, she was celebrated for her service and contribution to the field of anthropology, commitment to people of color and for her mentorship to young anthropologists by the Association of Black Anthropologists.

Johnnetta Cole wrote Green's eulogy, which appeared in several publications.

Green never married and did not have children of her own. She left her possessions, which included "a notable collection of Caribbean paintings", to be auctioned off and the proceeds from her possessions "to support two scholarship programs for black and Puerto Rican students in need at Rutgers University and William Penn College". She also planned for the proceeds to support the Zora Neale Hurston collection of Southern black culture at the University of Florida in Gainesville, Florida. She arranged for her library and papers to be kept at the Tuskegee Institute.

Lynn Bolles wrote an article, "African-American Soul Force: Dance, Music and Vera Mae Green" about Green's passion for dance, particularly the rhumba. The article was published in SAGE, in 1986. In 1996, Bolles dedicated her book, Sister Jamaica: A Study of Women, Work and Households in Kingston, to the memory of Vera Mae Green.

== Publications ==
- "The Confrontation of Diversity Within the Black Community" (1970)
- "Comments on Charles Valentine, Racism and Recent Anthropology of U.S. Blacks" (1972)
- "Methodological Problems Involved in the Study of Aruban Family". In Proceedings of the 2nd Conference on Family in the Caribbean. (1973)
- Migrants in Aruba: Interethnic Integration (1974)
- "Racial vs. Ethnic Factors in Afro-American and Afro-Caribbean Migration". In Migration, Change and Development: Implications for Ethnic Diversity and Policial Conflict. (1975)
- "The Black Extended Family in the United States: Some Research Suggestions". In The Extended Family in Black Societies. (1978)
- International Human Rights: Contemporary Perspectives – co-edited with Jack Nelson (1980)
- "U.S. Blacks: The Creation of an Enduring People?". In Persistent Peoples Cultural Enclaves in Perspective. (1981)
- "Dominica". In Political Parties of the Americas. (1982)

== See also ==
- List of African-American firsts
