= Association of Black Anthropologists =

American African American anthropologists organization

- Abbreviation: ABA
- Formation: December 2–7, 1975
- Headquarters: Arlington, Virginia, U.S.
- Region served: United States of America
- Members: 1,000+
- President: Bertin Louis
- Parent organization: American Anthropological Association
- Website: Official website

Founded in 1975, the Association of Black Anthropologists (ABA) is an American organization that brings together Black anthropologists in an effort to better highlight the history of African Americans, especially in regard to exploitation, oppression, and discrimination. It encourages, in particular, the involvement of Black students, including the recruitment of graduates, and establishes exchanges with African anthropologists. It publishes the journal Transforming Anthropology. The ABA seeks to address theories across academic disciplines that do not accurately represent the experience and oppression of communities of color and to aid and strengthen these theories with the inclusion of an African American historical perspective. It is one of the sections of the American Anthropological Association.

== History ==
The ABA had its origins in the Minority Caucus, which in 1968 became the Caucus of Black Anthropologists after a meeting on a Black curriculum for anthropological studies held in Seattle. At the 1969 meetings of the American Anthropological Association (AAA) in New Orleans, a symposium was held on "Ethnographic Research in Black Communities in the U.S." The following year, an AAA Committee on Minority Participation was formed under the chairmanship of Gloria Marshall. The Caucus was renamed the Association of Black Anthropologists in 1975 at that year's AAA meetings. During the Civil Rights era, black graduate students began to pressure the academic world and the AAA to create a platform that would recognize, give agency to, and encourage communication among black anthropologists. The ABA joined with the AAA officially in 1987 as a way to attain further resources to meet their objectives in putting black anthropologists on the map. This was done on the agreement that the ABA would be a multidisciplinary sector that focused on all areas of study by anthropologists that dealt with challenging the dominant hegemony of white supremacy, restoration and preservation of African heritage and expansion towards a more equal society, overall.

The first president of the Association of Black Anthropologists was Vera Green who served from 1977 to 1979.

=== Founding story ===
Prior to the 1960s there was little to no representation of black anthropologists at the doctorate level. Of the thirteen who did receive their doctorate prior to 1980, only a handful continued to teach in academia at the collegiate level and virtually none actively participated at the AAA. The Caucus of Black Anthropologist was founded to fill this void at the AAA conferences by representing Black anthropologists in the field. The individuals involved with the Caucus would become the founding cohort of the Association of Black Anthropologists. The Caucus collectively founded News from the Natives. The publication was intended to engage and connect past, present, and future black students and faculty of anthropology.

==== Editor ====
- Jerry Wright

==== Chair of caucus ====
- Anselme Remy

==== Committee members ====
- Delmos Jones
- Patricia Guthrie
- Gwen Mikell

== ABA Executive Board ==
The executive board consists of three elected officers who serve two-year terms: the president, president-elect, and secretary/treasurer; two to three members-at-large appointed by the elected officers; the general editor; the program chair; the student representative; and the nomination committee. The organization is self-defined as an egalitarian and participatory democracy with its members volunteering their time and resources.The current ABA Executive Board includes:

President

The president represents the ABA in the American Anthropological Association and oversees records of the ABA's activities.

- The current president is Bertin Louis.

President-Elect is Jemima Pierre and Secretary/Treasurer is Shanti Parikh.

The president-elect votes on appointed positions. The secretary-treasurer is responsible for drafting the annual budget as well as managing correspondence records and administrative documents created during their term.

Program Chair

The program chair is appointed by the elected officers and serves a two-year term. This position presides over the ABA's scientific programs.

- The current program chairs are Karen G. Williams and Mieka Polanco.

Other board members

- Aisha Beliso-de Jesus, Michael Ralph, and Laurence Ralph are the editors of the ABA's journal Transforming Anthropology.
- Michelle Munyikwa and Amelia Herbert are the Anthropology News editors.
- Omotayo Jolaosho is in charge of mentoring sessions.
- The current archivist is Kamela Heyward-Rotimi, who serves a 5-year term and is responsible for chronicling ABA-related documents.
- Kalfani Turé is the current member-at-large, responsible for voting for appointed positions.
- The positions of membership chair, awards chair, nomination committee, and student representative are currently vacant.

== Conferences and events ==
=== American Anthropological Association (AAA) annual meetings ===
The Association of Black Anthropologists (ABA) participates in the American Anthropological Associations (AAA) annual meeting. The AAA annual meeting brings together members of the AAA and provides space for sub-associations to hold seminars and discussions around their research The ABA's participation in the AAA annual meetings is best understood through the variety of discussion and presentations offered over the last decade. The ABA uses this space to hold board meetings, discussion on transforming Black presence in Anthropology and mentoring sessions for researchers and Grad students. Sessions held are specific to members of the ABA's research, often there are themes throughout the years which illustrate the ABA's focus, examples of past ABA sessions include:

==== 1990-2000 ====
AAA Annual meetings in the 20th Century included varied sponsored ABA sessions on Blackness in the United States and The African Diaspora. Topics addressed State Violence, White power, Black Identity and Performance and varied topics within the subject of the African Diaspora. Sessions sponsored by the ABA during this time included:

- "Teaching as Praxis: "Race" and Ideologies of Power" included topics on Racism, Teaching Language and Culture to Oppressed Groups, Teaching Race, Gender and class within a Racist and Anti-Racist framework"(1990).
- The 1991 Annual Meeting by the AAA included ABA sponsored topics on African American Dance, Food in Africa and the African Diaspora. Sessions included:
  - "Diaspora Dilemmas: The Divisive Impact of Racism on African Modes of Upward Mobility in Western Worlds"
- 1995 AAA Annual Meeting sessions sponsored by the ABA included:
  - "The "US Competitive Edge": Immiseration and Fascist Policy"
  - "Communicating Communities: The Politics and Poetics of Identity in the Public Sphere"
  - "Black Is...Black Ain't: Difference, Transnationality and the Signifier of Blackness"
  - "Violence and Institutional Systems of Power"
- The 1999 AAA Annual Meeting included extensive topics on Race, many sponsored and guided by the work of the ABA. Reported to include a dozen sessions around the topics of race and whiteness, such as "Racism and its Discontents: Past, Present and Future in Brazil" and "Performing 'Race' and Ethnicity in the Crisis of the Medical Moment".

==== 2000-2010 ====
ABA involvement in sessions at the AAA Annual Meetings before 2010 is less apparent than recent years and the public records to illustrate involvement is sparse. From 2000 to 2010 ABA sponsored sessions revolved around writing workshops, ABA board and business meetings, mentoring sessions and some special topics of global African issues and Race research in the United States. Session topics included:

- "Global Problems, Local Knowledge's: Negotiating Structures of Violence and Disease in Africa" (2000)
- "Writing for your Life" (2000) and other similar writing workshops.
- "Race, Gender and Engaged Research: Interrogating the Issues a Decade Later" was the only session sponsored by the ABA at the 2008 AAA annual meeting.

==== 2010-2012 ====
ABA Sponsored session at the AAA Annual meeting from 2010-2012 revolved around topics of the African Diaspora, Criminalization/Imprisonment of Black bodies, Race and Gender (representation in media and popular culture) and impacts of Gentrification and Politics.

- The 2011 AAA Annual meeting included ABA sessions that were diverse and varied across topics. Aside from ABA board meetings, mentoring sessions and business meetings, sessions sponsored by the ABA included:
  - "Anthropology and Historically Black Colleges and Universities", addressing the current state of Anthropology at HBCUs, how to build on and expand the discipline within HBCUs and challenges in doing so.
  - "Tracing Performance Aesthetics in Africa, The Caribbean and their Diasporas: The History Making, Public Art, Social Practice and Subjectivity" focused on topics of the Congo, Queer Caribbean Art, Trinidadian Rapso Performance and Visual Arts of the Caribbean.
  - "Theorizing Punishment and the State" included subsections punishment, criminalization of black bodies and mixed race persons and rethinking the incarceration of sexual assault survivors.
  - "Race and Gender Performance: Images and Representations of Black Masculinity and Femininity in Popular Culture and Film" discussed gender representation in popular culture, from masculinity (of men and women) to how race is portrayed in film and television - specifically an Ethnography of the "Real" Housewives of Atlanta (by Dr. Riche Daniel Barnes).
  - "Inequality:Immigration, Housing and Race" included topics on home ownership among low income communities, Gentrification, Afro-Caribbean experiences and other housing crises around the world.
- The 2012 AAA Annual Meeting included many new discussions sponsored by the ABA, many revolved around the expansion and reach of Anthropology. One session was titled "Imagining Anthropology without Borders". Additional topics included subjects around popular culture, youth performance, music and dance. Other sessions included the topics:
  - "Punishment and the State: Imprisonment, Transgressions, Scapegoats and The Contributions of Anthropology"
  - "Negotiated Blackness: The Politics of Genes, Gender, Beauty and Multi-Racial Identity"
  - "Telling the Truth: Pioneer, Archaeology, and Emancipation projects Then and Now"

==== 2012-2016 ====
ABA sponsored sessions at the AAA Annual Meetings between 2012 and 2016 discussed reoccurring topics of Gender, Black Bodies and the strengthening of Black Communities. The topics vary each year, there are however consistent sessions to discuss ways of transforming Anthropology and preserving the history and legacy of Black Academics and Leaders.

- The 2013 AAA Annual Meeting held 16 ABA sponsored sessions. As with previous years, topics varied from housing to gender and transforming Anthropology. Session subjects included:
  - "Black Women's Intellectual and Political Work Chicago Style: Conversations with Cathy Cohen and Barabara Ransby"
  - "Development, Housing and Community in African America" included topics on masculinity, segregation, political activism and politics of Brazil.
  - "Race and Racism in Comparative Perspective: Part II" discussed topics of Nationalism and Racism, challenges in addressing structural racism and other topics of rationalization, domestic and international.
  - "Museums, Cultural Sites and Landmarks of African America" included topics on the African Diaspora, Transculturalization, and preserving African Heritage through preservation efforts and exhibits.
- The 2014 AAA Annual Meeting continued to create discussion around transforming Anthropology and preserving the legacies of African American leaders. Some new topics included:
  - "Sorrow as Artifact: Black Radical Mothering in Times of Terror", topics on challenges of Black family and work life, Grief and Suicide, Necropolitics and Black Motherhood.
  - "Producing Anthropology through Community Engagement" addressed ways to do this through case studies of The University of Minnesota, Historically Black Neighborhoods and Haitian Peasant women, etc.
  - "At the Crossroads of Peril and Progress: HIV in Black Communities" included topics on Sex Tourism in Jamaica, Mental Health, Black Gay and Bisexual men, Queer Reparations, Structural Violence and the Black Church and ways to improve access to testing and resources.
- The 2015 AAA Annual Meeting held even more ABA sponsored sessions than before, at 22 sessions. The topics ranged from state violence to maternal relationships. Continuing conversations around Black bodies, Racialization and the African Diaspora. Other session topics included:
  - "Market Perceptions: Negotiating Visibilities of Space, Identity and Racial-ness". discussing topics of Black speech, Queer theory, Nollywood and Gender, to name a few.
  - "Black Bodies, Active Agents: Foodways in the Everyday Lives of Black People" included topics on Social Justice and Inclusivity at Memphis Farmers Markets, Changing and Unequal Foodscapes, Urban Family Foodways and Food Deserts.
  - "Race, Power and Educational Justice in Diverse Learning Contexts" discussed topics on Power and Student Discipline, Racial tensions, #Blacklivesmatter and African American Youth.

==== 2016-present ====
Recent ABA sponsored sessions have centered around topics of the re-emergence of racism and whiteness in the United States, representations of Black bodies and Black culture in media, Black Women's health, Gender and Queerness and State Violence (Mass Incarceration). Discussions from 2016 to the present are central to popular culture and racialized politics of the 21st century.

- The 2016 AAA Annual Meeting included ABA sponsored sessions focused on the politics and embodiment of Blackness, Gendered Blackness and Black Bodies (specifically in popular culture and protest), as well as Whiteness and White Supremacy. Sessions held included, but not limited to:
  - "The Bio-politics of Gendered 'Blackness': Transnational Perspectives on Women, Race and Health", topics on Life and Death, Fertility Control and Reproduction and other topics of Black Women's health.
  - "Anthropology of White Supremacy" discussed topics of Religions (within White Supremacy and the African Diaspora), policing of Black bodies and Racist logic.
  - "The Art of Identity: (Re) Constructing Blackness in Music, Film, TV and the Internet" included topics on mainstream African Diasporic Art, the Black Church and Queerness and Black Women in Indie Film, to name a few.
- The 2017 AAA Annual Meeting continued conversations, sponsored by the ABA, around Racism and Anti-Racism, Whiteness, Media representations of Blackness and many facets of the politics of Blackness in the United States. Sessions sponsored by the ABA included:
  - "Identity politics versus naive wokerism? Revisiting race, class and gender in the era of Trump and Brexit", included topics such as the Gini Coefficient (Spain and the United States), Migration after Brexit and Trump's 'White working class support'.
  - "Centering Prisons: Re-framing Analysis of the State, Relations of Power and Resistance", discussed topics on Whiteness in State Prisons, Addiction and Sobriety in Prisons and the results of a criminal record.
  - "There's Level to This: Protest, Disruption, Resistance" included topics on African Diasporic Religions, Social Justice and Activism, Racialized Violence and Human Rights.
  - "The Whitelash is Real: The New Politics of Exclusion"

=== Awards and scholarships ===
The Association of Black Anthropologists funds awards and scholarships for exceptional anthropologists, researchers and scholars who contribute to the community through their work, specifically seeking to fund scholars who emphasize diversity in their work and conduct research in communities of color.

==== ABA Legacy Scholar Award ====
This award was established in 2008 to honor research, scholarship, and service to anthropologists for their work for communities of African descent. This award is associated with Sankofa, the word in Akan which means "looking backward to move forward". this symbol represents an appreciation and knowledge of the past- in order to pay tribute to those before us. This award recognizes black anthropologists in the past who created opportunities for current black anthropologists and others. Winners have been

Yolanda Moses ( 2015)	Leith Mullings ( 2015)	Anselme Remy ( 2014)
A Lynn Bolles ( 2013)	Arthur K Spears ( 2013)	Faye V. Harrison ( 2010)
Ira E. Harrison ( 2010)	George C. Bond ( 2009)	Johnnetta Cole ( 2009)
Audrey Smedley ( 2009)		

The candidates can be nominated by the ABA Legacy scholar committee, or by colleagues.

==== Johnnetta B. Cole Student Travel Award ====
Named after Johnnetta B. Cole, who along with many other achievements, was the first female African-American president of Spelman College in 1987. As a professor at Washington State University, she cofounded one of the first black studies programs in the United States.

This award is in place to supplement travel expenses to ABA annual meetings to further student of African descent. applicants must be current ABA members, and enrolled din Ph.D. or Masters programs.

==== The Gwaltney Scholarship Fund ====
This award was created in honor of John L. Gwaltney (1928-1998), who through his research had a strong emphasis on black life in industrial cities. Gwaltney was a writer and anthropologist, whose research was centered around African-American culture. He was a student of Margaret Mead, and although he lost his eyesight as a child, is well known for his book; Drylongso: Self Portrait of Black America.

This award is given to member os the ABA, to those in any field of anthropology who have not been assistant professor for more than two years, in order to help scholars further their research. Along with the monetary award, the winner will be published din Transforming Anthropology.

==== The Vera Green Publication Award ====
This award was established in 2007, created in honor of Dr. Vera Mae Green (1928-1982) who was a pioneer in public and caribbean anthropology. She focused on activism, issues of poverty, and international human rights, along with contributing to a better understanding of aging an migration. Dr. Green was a prominent activist in encouraging African Americans and people of color to pursue anthropology.

The applicants must have a Ph.D with work pertaining to public anthropology. the winner will be published in ABA's journal: Transforming Anthropology

==== Margaret Clark Award For Student Papers ====
Awarded by the Association for Anthropology and Gerontology, this award is open to ABA members and supported by the Association.

== Current ABA research ==
=== Increasing African American presence in anthropology ===
The ABA, based on its founding purpose and missions, fundamentally works towards increasing the presence of African Americans in the discipline of Anthropology. These efforts are put forth through anthropological research and journals by African American Scholars and Anthropologists alike. This includes working towards getting people of color admitted into programs for Doctorates or Graduate degrees through ABA sponsored mentoring, scholarships and awards. Through the practice of increasing the presence of African American scholars in Anthropology, Dr.Tony Whitehead (Professor of Medical Anthropology at the University of Maryland and member of the ABA) suggests that the ABA is also opening up avenues for both people of color and other marginalized groups to engage in higher education. Dr. Whitehead, in association with the AAA, the ABA and WAPA (the Washington Association of Professional Anthropologists) is continuing research on the lack of African American representation in Anthropology in effort to increase the presence of persons of color in the discipline. This research was initiated after a 2014 interview with Karen Brodkin (Professor of Emeritus in the Anthropology Department at UCLA) in which she stated that Anthropology is still a white public space based on a 2013 online survey of the scarcity of African Americans in Anthropology. The current editors have emphasized their responsibility towards an anthropology that dismantles the racial, sexual and gendered norms by expanding the barriers to what counts as anthropology and acknowledging their biases. Their goal is to reject the standard anthropological position of neutrality, and encourage activism, action and coalition-building.

=== Race and Religion Special Forum ===
The organization's journal, Transforming Anthropology's, is where one can find the most recently published work of ABA scholars. The October 2017 issue, "Race and Religion Special Forum," features six articles that look at how race, religion, African-diaspora and the state intersect when dealing with the treatment of Black people within and outside state institutions. This work specifically delves into the United States' context and Nigeria, arguing that religion and race determine one's citizenship, rights and the access to resources provided by the state. The first article by anthropologists, Michal Ralph, Aisha Beliso-De Jesús and Stephan Palmié titled, "Saint Tupac," makes the argument that rapper Tupac Shakur has continued, even after death, to be a spearhead figure in battling white supremacy, capitalism and the oppression of African-Americans. They make connections between the poetic lyrics and African-diasporic religions and how his holographic presence at Coachella has led him to a sainthood status, not in alignment with Catholicism, but with traditional Afro-Cuban religions, and through this resurrection, has continued to inspire and fight against white supremacy. "Citizens and Suspects: Race, Gender and the Making of American Muslim Citizenship" is the second article featured by Su'ad Abdul Khabeer brings ethnographic focus on two Muslim women and how their status, although both people of color and Muslim, has rendered different due to the de facto discrimination of brown Muslim people. Whereas American society does not associate blackness with being Muslim, the disparity of being brown and Muslim produces very different circumstances with citizenship and discrimination. The third article, "Church and (re)Birth: Legacies of Christianity for Maternal Care in Nigeria," examines how the expansion of Pentecostal birthing centers in Nigeria have come into conflict with state-run, secular hospitals, modeled after the West. The birthing centers have been labeled as an interference to the state's neoliberal methods of treatment, deeming it harmful and counterproductive to further medical advancements. The state's opposition to the religious practices is meant to reveal the Western influence of medicine through control of women's bodies during the birthing process. The fourth article, "Beyond Genealogies: Expertise and Religious Knowledge in Legal Cases Involving African Diasporic Publics," by Kamari Maxine Clarke, looks at how anthropological approaches to religion, particularly religions associated with the Black diasporic, have advanced in academia, but are still illegitimate in the court of law. Clarke has been brought in to testify as an anthropological expert on African diasporic religions in a legal proceeding. Many of these religious practices are unknown and unacknowledged by the Christian-dominated hegemonic practices of the West, so the article suggests that anthropologists build new frameworks of diasporic religions that will allow them to be deemed legible in state institutions. The last two articles are transcribed interviews and conversations between ABA members and prominent scholars of the African diasporic religious contributions.

=== Anthropology in Action ===
In order to align their research with the ABA's goals of inciting action and transformation of anthropological practice, the October issue dedicates a section to practicing an activist-approach anthropology, labelled as "Anthropology in Action". The two featured articles take an activist-based approach to anthropology that gives space to underrepresented voices. "(Re) Politicizing the Anthropologist in the Age of Neoliberalism and #BlackLivesMatter," by Sarah Lacy and Ashton Rome, critiques the collegiate and university structure as an extension of the state. "Love Dem Bad: Embodied Experience, Self-Adoration, and Eroticism in Dancehall," look at how "dancehall" dance is used as a form of Black self-love, self-expression and resistance against the societal hegemony.

=== Books written by members on current research ===
Members of the ABA often facilitate the use of books to present their research. Some of these books and authors have been awarded or recognized by various university presses for the content and the research being conducted. Some of the books are as follows:

- The Pursuit of Happiness: Black Women, Diasporic Dreams, and the Politics of Emotional Transnationalism is written by Bianca C. Williams, a Duke graduate and current educator at the Graduate Center, CUNY. This book describes the experiences of African American women who travel to Jamaica with respect to American racism's transnationality, as well as the intersectionality of race, sexuality and gender.
- Health Equity in Brazil: Intersections of Gender, Race, and Policy is written by Kia Lilly Caldwell, a Princeton graduate and current associate professor at University of North Carolina, Chapel Hill. This book describes the structural health policy institution in Brazil that has prevented a large portion of the country's population, in particular the Afro-Brazilian population, from achieving equal healthcare opportunities even during a time of significant HIV/AIDS advancements.
- Sex Tourism in Bahia: Ambiguous Entanglements is written by Erica Lorraine Williams, a Stanford graduate and current associate professor at Spelman College in Georgia. This book outlines the various perspectives, from tourists to workers to locals, on sex tourism and the exploitation of the workers, including Afro-Brazilians involved in the erotic business. This book also describes the different aspects of the business such as transnational romantic relationships and sexual activities within the Brazilian state.
