= Academy of American Franciscan History =

The Academy of American Franciscan History was founded in 1943 in Washington, D.C., as an institution to promote scholarship on the history of the Franciscan Order in the Americas. The inauguration of the Academy "brought together a large group of scholars in the Latin American field," including Howard Mumford Jones, John Tate Lanning, and Carlos E. Castañeda.

== Members ==
The core members of the Academy included Antonine Tibesar O.F.M. and Maynard Geiger, O.F.M., with Roderick Wheeler, O.F.M., serving as its first director. A number of non-Franciscans pursuing the history of the order were made corresponding members of the Academy, including John Tate Lanning, France V. Scholes, Herbert E. Bolton, and George P. Hammond. The Academy is a research institute, now based in Oceanside, California, on the campus of Mission San Luis Rey and is affiliated with the Franciscan School of Theology. Fr. Antonine Tibesar, O.F.M. was succeeded by its first lay academic director John Frederick Schwaller. Its current director is Jeffrey Burns, (PhD University of Notre Dame), who also holds a faculty position at the Franciscan School of Theology.

The Academy's books, reference works, and pamphlets remain in the Washington, D.C. area, in Takoma Park, Maryland. Its rare books and archival material are part of the library at University of San Diego. There is a finding aid for its microfilm collection. The academy is the publisher of the quarterly peer reviewed scholarly journal, The Americas, a leading journal in Latin American studies founded in 1944, published by Cambridge University Press and available electronically via Project MUSE. The editorial office is at Drexel University in Philadelphia. The journal has from its foundation "published articles unrelated to the Franciscans."

The Academy also publishes a monograph series and scholarly editions of writings of Franciscans, such as St Junípero Serra. The Academy also supports dissertation research on the Franciscans in the Americas.
