= Florence Babb =

American anthropologist

Florence E. Babb
- Born: Florence Evelyn Babb; February 21, 1951 (age 75); Goshen, New York
- Occupations: Anthropologist, author, editor, academic, engaged scholar
- Known for: Research on anthropology, gender, sexuality, race, and class in Latin America
- Title: Anthony Harrington Distinguished Professor in Latin American Studies and Professor of Anthropology Emerita

Academic background
- Education: Tufts University, University at Buffalo
- Thesis: Women and marketing in Huaraz, Peru : the political economy of petty commerce (1981)

Academic work
- Discipline: Anthropology, Gender studies, Race and ethnicity studies, Tourism studies
- Sub-discipline: Cultural, feminist, urban, and economic anthropology, Gender studies, Latin American studies
- Institutions: Colgate University; University of Iowa; University of Florida; University of North Carolina at Chapel Hill
- Notable works: Between Field and Cooking Pot, After Revolution: Mapping Gender and Cultural Politics in Neoliberal Nicaragua, The Tourism Encounter: Fashioning Latin American Nations and Histories, Women's Place in the Andes: Engaging Decolonial Feminist Anthropology
- Website: anthropology.unc.edu/people/florence-e-babb/

Florence Evelyn Babb (born February 21, 1951) is an American anthropologist, author and editor. Babb is the Anthony Harrington Distinguished Professor in Latin American Studies and Professor of Anthropology Emerita at the University of North Carolina at Chapel Hill.

== Biography ==
Babb was born in Goshen, New York, February 21, 1951. She earned a BA in Anthropology and French in 1973 from Tufts University, and then earned from the State University of New York at Buffalo an M.A. (1976) and a Ph.D. (1981) in Anthropology.

Babb was appointed the Anthony Harrington Distinguished Professor in Latin American Studies and Professor of Anthropology at the University of North Carolina at Chapel Hill (2014–2024) and as of July 2024 holds the title of Professor of Anthropology Emerita. Before that, she was the Vada Allen Yeomans Professor of Women's Studies at the University of Florida (2005–2014), and she held a faculty position in Anthropology and Women's Studies at the University of Iowa (1982–2004), where she served terms as Chair of the Department of Anthropology (2001–2003) and Women's Studies (1994–1997, 1983–1985). At Iowa, she helped develop a graduate specialization in Feminist Anthropology and a PhD program in Women's Studies. Early in her career, she taught at Colgate University as a Visiting Instructor to assistant professor of anthropology (1979–1982).

Babb has performed ethnographic research in Peru, as well as in Nicaragua, Cuba, and Southern Mexico. Her most recent book is Women’s Place in the Andes: Engaging Decolonial Feminist Anthropology (2018) and since its publication, she has been working on a multi-sited ethnography of three regions in Peru, entitled Scaling Differences: Place, Race, and Gender in Andean Peru. She has conducted fieldwork in the highland city of Huaraz, the rural Indigenous community of Vicos, and the capital city of Lima. Three of her books have been translated and published in Spanish.

Babb has published numerous books, articles, and chapters on the topics of gender, sexuality, race and class in changing contexts in Latin America. Her books include Between Field and Cooking Pot: The Political Economy of Marketwomen in Peru, After revolution: Mapping Gender and Cultural Politics in Neoliberal Nicaragua, and The Tourism Encounter: Fashioning Latin American Nations and Histories.

Babb has received awards and fellowships from the Fulbright, Wenner-Gren, and Rockefeller Foundations among others. Her work was honored with the 2020 Lifetime Achievement Award (Premio Legado y Trayectoria) from the Peru Section of the Latin American Studies Association.

=== Professional and political engagement ===
Babb has held positions with the American Anthropological Association (AAA) and the Latin American Studies Association (LASA). Her leadership roles in AAA over the years include President, Association for Feminist Anthropology (AFA); Co-chair, Committee on World Anthropologies; Nominations Committee; Committee on Minority Issues in Anthropology; Section Assembly Convener; Executive Board Cultural Seat; and chair, Association Operations Committee. As of 2024, she is completing a term on the Board of the AFA and has been elected to the position of AAA Secretary on the executive board, 2024–2027.

Babb is a past associate editor of the Journal of Latin American and Caribbean Anthropology and a participating editor for Latin American Perspectives: A Journal on Capitalism and Socialism. She edited or co-edited special issues of the journals Latin American and Caribbean Ethnic Studies (2022), Voices (2011), Latin American Perspectives (2008, 2002), and Critique of Anthropology (2005).

== Selected works ==
=== Books ===
- Babb, Florence E. (1998). Between field and cooking pot: the political economy of marketwomen in Peru. Texas Press sourcebooks in anthropology (Revised ed.). Austin: University of Texas Press. ISBN 978-0-292-70870-9. OCLC 40452591.
- Babb, Florence E. (2001). After revolution: mapping gender and cultural politics in neoliberal Nicaragua. Austin: University of Texas Press. ISBN 978-0-292-70899-0. OCLC 46419767.
- Babb, Florence E. (2011). The tourism encounter: fashioning Latin American nations and histories. Stanford, CA: Stanford University Press. ISBN 978-0-8047-7560-1. OCLC 719383009.
- Babb, Florence E. (2018). Women's place in the Andes : engaging decolonial feminist anthropology. Oakland: University of California Press. ISBN 978-0-520-29816-3. OCLC 1022080647.

=== Articles ===
- Babb, F.E., 2022. ‘The real indigenous are higher up’: locating race and gender in Andean Peru. Latin American and Caribbean Ethnic Studies, 17(1), pp. 12–33.
- Babb, F.E., 2012. Theorizing gender, race, and cultural tourism in Latin America: A view from Peru and Mexico. Latin American Perspectives, 39(6), pp. 36–50.
- Babb, F.E., 2011. Che, Chevys, and Hemingway's daiquiris: Cuban tourism in a time of globalisation. Bulletin of Latin American Research, 30(1), pp. 50–63.
- Babb, F.E., 2010. Sex and sentiment in Cuban tourism. Caribbean Studies, pp. 93–115.
- Babb, F.E., 2009. Neither in the closet nor on the balcony: Private lives and public activism in Nicaragua. Out in public: Reinventing lesbian/gay anthropology in a globalizing world, pp. 240–255.
- Wolseth, J. and Babb, F.E., 2008. Introduction: Youth and cultural politics in Latin America. Latin American Perspectives, 35(4), pp. 3–14.
- Babb, F.E., 2007. Queering love and globalization. GLQ: A Journal of Lesbian and Gay Studies, 13(1), pp. 111–123.
- Babb, F.E., 2004. Recycled Sandalistas: From revolution to resorts in the new Nicaragua. American Anthropologist, 106(3), pp. 541–555.
- Babb, F.E., 2003. Out in Nicaragua: local and transnational desires after the revolution. Cultural Anthropology, 18(3), pp. 304–328.
- Babb, F.E., 2001. Nicaraguan narratives of development, nationhood, and the body. Journal of Latin American Anthropology, 6(1), pp. 84–119.
- Babb, F.E., 1999. “Managua Is Nicaragua” The Making of a Neoliberal City. City & Society, 11(1‐2), pp. 27–48.
- Babb, F.E., 1997. Negotiating spaces: Gender, economy, and cultural politics in Post‐Sandinista Nicaragua. Identities Global Studies in Culture and Power, 4(1), pp. 45–70.
- Babb, F.E., 1996. After the revolution: Neoliberal policy and gender in Nicaragua. Latin American Perspectives, 23(1), pp. 27–48.
- Babb, F.E., 1990. Women and work in Latin America. Latin American Research Review, 25(2), pp. 236–247.
- Babb, F.E., 1990. Women's work: engendering economic anthropology. Urban Anthropology and Studies of Cultural Systems and World Economic Development, pp. 277–302.

== Awards and honors ==
- 2021: The Institute for the Arts and Humanities Fellowship for her book Scaling Differences: Place, Race, and Gender in Andean Peru
- 2020: The Association for Feminist Anthropology's Senior Book Prize, Honorable Mention for her book Women’s Place in the Andes: Engaging Decolonial Feminist Anthropology
- 2020: Latin American Studies Association's Peru section's Premio Legado y Trayectoria's - Lifetime Achievement Award
- 2001: Elsa Chaney Prize, Gender Studies Section of the Latin American Studies Association (LASA)
