= Ethnohistory (journal) =

Academic anthropology journal

- Discipline: Anthropology, cultural studies, ethnology, social history
- Language: English
- Edited by: Robbie Ethridge; John Frederick Schwaller

Publication details
- History: 1954-present
- Publisher: Duke University Press on behalf of the American Society for Ethnohistory (United States)
- Frequency: Quarterly

Standard abbreviations
- ISO 4: Ethnohistory

Indexing
- ISSN: 0014-1801 (print); 1527-5477 (web)
- LCCN: 2002-227248
- JSTOR: 00141801
- OCLC no.: 51205286

Links
- Journal homepage

Ethnohistory is a peer-reviewed academic journal established in 1954 and published quarterly by Duke University Press on behalf of the American Society for Ethnohistory. It publishes articles and reviews in the fields of ethnohistory, historical anthropology, and social and cultural history. Like its sponsoring professional society, Ethnohistory has represented a meeting ground between scholars in the disciplines of history and anthropology. Geography and other disciplines have been increasingly represented in its pages over time. Founded by scholars focused primarily on studies of Native North America, the journal has, over its history, progressively become more global in scope.

Editors

- 1997-2007 Neil L. Whitehead
