= Tibesar =

Tibesar is a surname. Notable people with the surname include:

- Antonine Tibesar, Latino Franciscan friar
- Tim Tibesar (born 1972), American football coach
