= Norma Chinchilla =

American sociologist (born 1945)

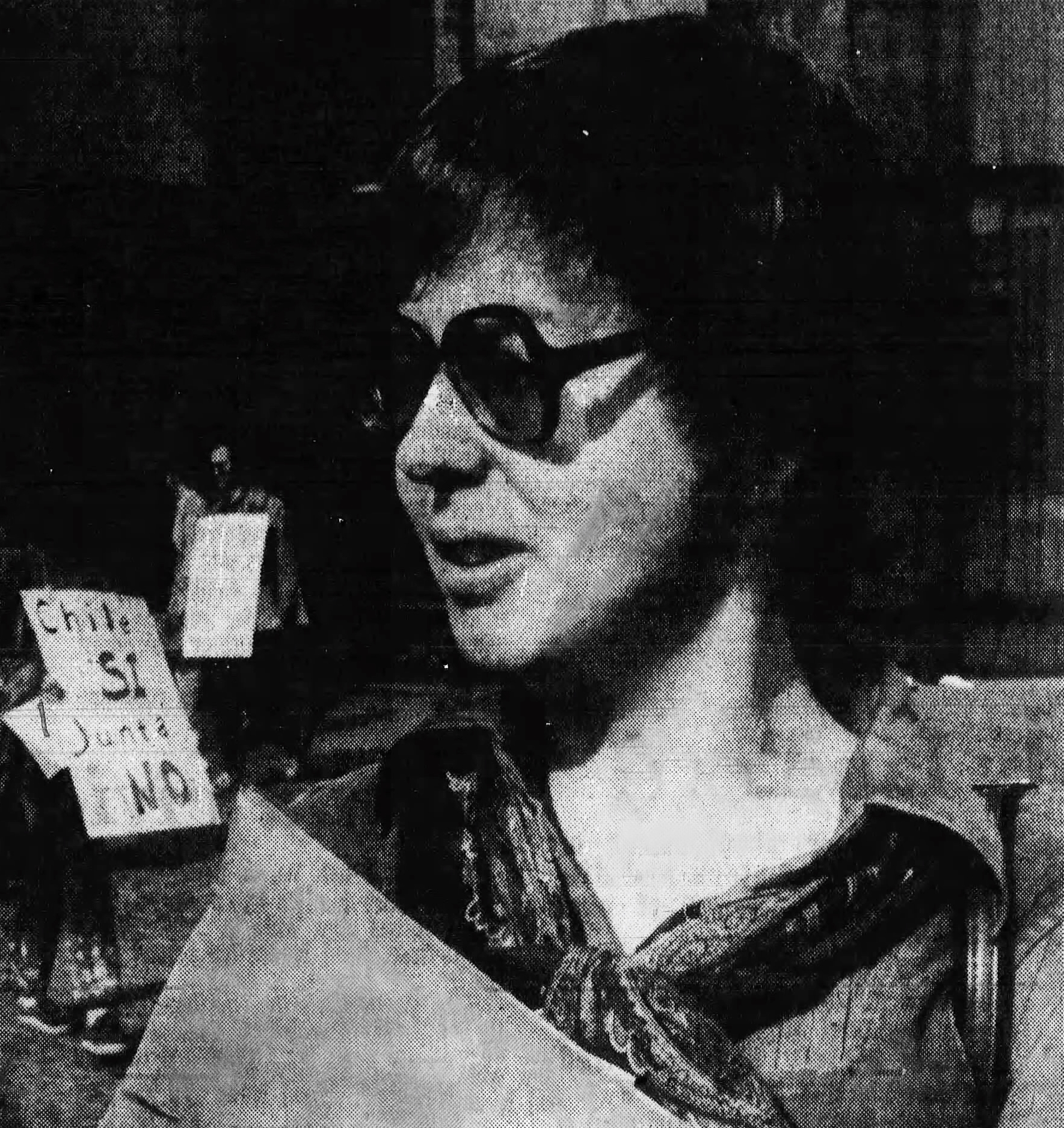
- Born: Norma Jean Stoltz; 1945 (age 80–81); Washington State
- Other name: Norma Stoltz Chinchilla
- Occupation: Sociologist

Norma Chinchilla (born 1945) is an American sociologist. Chinchilla taught women's, gender and sexuality studies, and was instrumental in the development of Central American research being incorporated into the field of Latin American studies. She was one of the founders of the journal Latin American Perspectives in 1974 and a co-founder in 1976, or the first women's studies program offered at the University of California, Irvine. In 2017, she was awarded the Julian Samora Distinguished Career Award from the American Sociological Association.

== Early life, education and family ==
Norma Jean Stoltz was born in 1945, in Washington state to Norma E. (née Beierlein) and Fred W. Stoltz. Her father was an engineer, and Stoltz had two sisters, Margaret and Kathryne. Her grandparents were German immigrants and there was a strong identification with immigrant concerns in the family. They moved to the San Francisco Bay Area, where Stoltz graduated from James Logan High School in Union City, California in 1962, and continued her education at Raymond College in Stockton. After completing her undergraduate studies, she was awarded a Fulbright Scholarship in 1965, and studied political science and sociology at the University of San Carlos Law School in Guatemala City for a year. Having been radicalized by the political events of the 1960s, she chose Guatemala over the objections of the US embassy. Of her time in Guatemala, Stoltz stated that it further radicalized her, as the students were rebelling against policies of the military dictatorship, which included discrimination against and genocide of the Indigenous Maya population, and assassinations of students and activists by the regime.

Stoltz earned a law degree in Guatemala in 1966, and later that year, she enrolled in graduate school at the University of Wisconsin, in Madison, Wisconsin. During her studies, she met Jorge Ramiro Chinchilla, a Guatemalan immigrant who studied at the University of San Carlos and was later employed at the University of Madison computing center. The couple married on the campus of Raymond College at the University of the Pacific in 1968. After completing her master's degree in sociology, Chinchilla began pursuing a PhD. She was involved with student activists and helped organize seminars and hold teach-ins on Marxism. At the time, there was only one woman on the faculty, and sexism by fellow male students and faculty members was a common experience for women students. In 1970, Chinchilla was hired as an assistant professor at Pitzer College, a liberal arts university, in Claremont, California. She was introduced to the Los Angeles Group for Latin American Solidarity by colleagues Don and Marjorie Bray. In an interview, Chinchilla remarked that she was shocked when she was fired from this first job after the first year teaching, because of her activism. She moved to Chile, during the Salvador Allende presidency, and completed her PhD research there between 1972 and 1973.

== Career ==
=== Teaching ===
After completing her PhD, Chinchilla began working at University of California, Irvine (UCI) and in 1974, along with other academics who were active in the Los Angeles Group for Latin American Solidarity or Union of Radical Latin Americanists, she co-founded the journal Latin American Perspectives. At UCI, she and mathematician Janet Williams designed a women's studies curricula in 1976, which included courses in social science, biology, and literature. Chinchilla admitted that as instructors, she and her students learned together as during her own education she was not taught about women or female role models. Although she and Williams worked with other colleagues to design the interdisciplinary courses, some of their fellow academics were cautioned not to participate in the program. Some of their male colleagues strongly opposed the creation of the first women's studies program at UCI, fearing that it would radicalize students. In the early 1980s, Chinchilla founded the Guatemala Information Center in Los Angeles, to provide assistance to immigrants new to the area. After teaching for eight years, she was embroiled in a tenure dispute, as some of her colleagues filed an ethics dispute against her, which Chinchilla later said was because women were forbidden tenure if they had children. She also said that much of the controversy had to do with her teaching the women's studies courses.

After losing her tenure battle, Chinchilla began working at California State University, Long Beach, as an associate professor in 1983, where she jointly taught sociology and women's studies. Throughout her teaching career, she continued her activism, for example, attending the Latin American and Caribbean Feminist Encuentros in the 1980s and 1990s, and speaking out against anti-immigration sentiments regarding admittance of migrants to school systems in 2014. She became a full professor and served as director of the women's studies program. In addition to her academic work, from 1988, she served on the board of directors of the Inter-Hemisphere Education Resource Center. She also was co-chair of the Women's Task Force for the Latin American Studies Association and served as chair of several committees of the American Sociological Association in the 1990s. California State Long Beach honored her with the Distinguished Faculty Scholarly and Creative Achievement Awards for the academic term 1996–1997. She received the Lifetime Achievement Award for Contributions to Central American Studies in 2012 from the Teresa Lozano Long Institute of Latin American Studies at Austin and Center for Mexican American Studies at Arlington, both part of the University of Texas system, for her activism and academic work on behalf of Central America. In 2017, she was awarded the American Sociological Association's Julian Samora Distinguished Career Award, in recognition of her work to include studies on Central America as part of Latin American studies curricula.

=== Research ===
Some of Chinchilla's early works evaluated Latin American labor markets and how the development of industry drew large numbers of uneducated women to the cities, where they worked as poor domestics. Rather than solving economic problems or expanding women's spheres, industrial development, instead, solidified women's place in the home and relegated them to be marginal members of society. Her research into Latin American and Caribbean women found that, as was typical elsewhere, (Note: Women's history was institutionally neglected by historians and academics, who distorted the historical record by omitting and obscuring women's experiences. This led to widespread lack of knowledge about women until the creation, beginning worldwide in the 1960s and 1970s, of women's studies programs. For example, before 1960, only thirteen published texts in the United States dealt with women's history, and those typically included limited information about colonial women or Antebellum Southern women.) women's contributions were ignored and undervalued. She stated that in the rare instance a woman's story was recorded, she was recorded and treated as an "honorary [man]", because influential women were deemed as exceptions and not representative of other women. In evaluating women's contributions in Latin America, Chinchilla uncovered evidence that women had always been involved in socio-political movements, typically those that impacted and improved their ability to complete the basic responsibilities of women in society. Her work showed that in varying historical periods, women across social class hierarchies, networked to protest social injustice and change society. She put forth the argument that the lack of knowledge of early feminist movements, particularly the organizing work done by radical, socialist, and anarchist women in the region, prevented the emergence of Second-wave feminism. Chinchilla concluded that lack of progress on women's issues, by liberal regimes in the region, pushed women into radical and anti-colonial, nationalist groups. She also conducted research into women who participated in the Cuban and Nicaraguan Revolutions, concluding from a Marxist feminist perspective, that while women's conditions and opportunities were generally improved under socialism, rampant sexism by revolutionary leaders created policies that impacted women's empowerment.

Chinchilla co-authored several works with Nora Hamilton of the University of Southern California. Some of these evaluated how civil and political crises in Central America had led to recessions and mass displacement, as well as migration. Their major collaboration on Seeking Community in a Global City: Guatemalans and Salvadorans in Los Angeles written in 2001 detailed the transformation of the economy and neighborhoods of Los Angeles in the 1980s and 1990s when a large migration of Central Americans moved to the metropolis. Chinchilla and Hamilton's analysis showed that many of the workers were employed as informal laborers, working as day laborers, garment workers, janitors or domestic workers or street vendors. The book examined the difficult path Central Americans had in organizing and collaborating among themselves to find organizations which could assist them with migrant matters. Because they lacked the resources to visit and stay in contact with families abroad and many were undocumented, they either had to create networks themselves, or locate sympathetic activists from the Sanctuary or Chicano Movements to help with labor and immigration questions. Violence and instability in their own countries also prevented many from returning home, as they worried about personal safety issues. In her review of Seeking Community in a Global City, Tamar Diana Wilson called Chinchilla and Hamilton's book, "exemplary" for its efforts to highlight immigrant rights, migrant work organization, and their self-help networks" and recommended it as a model to examine other urban ethnic groups. In 2002, Chinchilla and Hamilton shared the American Political Science Association's The Best Book Award, in the category of Race/Ethnicity and Foreign Policy/Globalization for Seeking Community in a Global City.

== Later life ==
In 2022, after her retirement from California State Long Beach, Chinchilla was appointed to serve a two-year term on the Senior Citizen Commission of the Long Beach City Council.

== Selected works ==
- Hamilton, Nora; Chinchilla, Norma Stoltz (January 1991). "Central American Migration: A Framework for Analysis". Latin American Research Review. 26 (1). Austin, Texas: University of Texas at Austin: 75–110. doi:10.1017/S0023879100034920. ISSN 0023-8791. JSTOR 2503765. OCLC 9983594946.
- Chinchilla, Norma Stoltz (September 1991). "Marxism, Feminism, and the Struggle for Democracy in Latin America". Gender & Society. 5 (3). Thousand Oaks, California: Sage Publishing: 291–310. doi:10.1177/089124391005003003. ISSN 0891-2432. JSTOR 189842. OCLC 9971162966.
- Chinchilla, Norma Stoltz (1993). "2. Gender and National Politics: Issues and Trends in Women's Participation in Latin American Movements". In Acosta-Belen, Edna; Bose, Christine E. (eds.). Researching Women In Latin America And The Caribbean. Boulder, Colorado: Westview Press. pp. 37–54. ISBN 978-0-8133-8465-8.
- Chinchilla, Norma (1997). "21. Marxism, Feminism, and the Struggle for Democracy in Latin America". In Hennessy, Rosemary; Ingraham, Chrys (eds.). Materialist Feminism: A Reader in Class, Difference, and Women's Lives. New York, New York: Routledge. pp. 214–226. ISBN 978-0-415-91633-2.
- Hamilton, Nora; Chinchilla, Norma Stoltz (Fall 1999). "Changing Networks and Alliances in a Transnational Context: Salvadoran and Guatemalan Immigrants in Southern California". Social Justice. 26 (3). San Francisco, California: Global Options: 4–26. ISSN 1043-1578. JSTOR 29767158. OCLC 9973350269.
- Hamilton, Nora; Chinchilla, Norma Stoltz (2001). Seeking Community in a Global City: Guatemalans and Salvadorans in Los Angeles. Philadelphia, Pennsylvania: Temple University Press. ISBN 978-1-56639-867-1.
- Carrillo, Ana Lorena; Chinchilla, Norma Stoltz (2010). "8. From Urban Elite to Peasant Organizing: Agendas, Accomplishments and Challenges of Thirty-plus Years of Guatemalan Feminism, 1975–2007". In Maier, Elizabeth; Lebon, Nathalie (eds.). Women's Activism in Latin America and the Caribbean: Engendering Social Justice, Democratizing Citizenship. New Brunswick, New Jersey: Rutgers University Press. pp. 140–158. ISBN 978-0-8135-4728-2.
- Zentgraf, Kristine M.; Chinchilla, Norma Stoltz (February 2012). "Transnational Family Separation: A Framework for Analysis". Journal of Ethnic and Migration Studies. 38 (2). Abingdon-on-Thames, Oxfordshire: Routledge: 345–366. doi:10.1080/1369183X.2011.646431. ISSN 1369-183X. OCLC 4839546786.
