= Lauren Rea =

Academic and professor

Lauren Rea is Professor of Latin American Studies at the University of Sheffield. She is Director of Research and Innovation for the University's School of Languages and Cultures.

In 2023 Professor Rea was appointed a Member of the British Empire (MBE) in King Charles' Birthday Honours, in recognition of her services to education in Latin America and the UK.

Professor Rea's research focuses on inclusive education in Latin America. She is co-director of the Great Latin American Women Project, which produces classroom resources on gender equality for primary school teachers. Her work also includes a project with the British Academy's Global Challenges Research Fund, working with academics and Indigenous teachers in Argentina on integrating intercultural perspectives into the teaching of patriotic anniversaries.

== Education ==
Rea studied Spanish and Portuguese at King's College London. She then pursued a Master of Philosophy (MPhil) at the University of Cambridge before returning to King's for her PhD.
