= Caribbeanist =

A Caribbeanist is a scholar who specializes in the study of the Caribbean region of the Americas -- its literature, culture, politics, society, ecology and so forth. In some academic disciplines Caribbean studies are seen as a branch of the larger field of Latin American studies.

== See also ==
- Vera Mae Green
