= Rethinking Global Labour: After Neoliberalism =

2018 book by Ronaldo Munck

- Author: Ronaldo Munck
- Language: English
- Subject: Labor and globalization
- Publisher: Agenda Publishing
- Publication date: September 2018
- Pages: 280
- ISBN: 9781788211055

Rethinking Global Labour: After Neoliberalism is a 2018 book by Irish-Argentine sociologist Ronaldo Munck, published by Agenda Publishing. Munck documents transformations in the global workforce after the 2008 financial crisis. The author argues that neoliberal capitalism has inadvertently created conditions for new forms of worker resistance.

== Author ==
In a 2015 interview, Munck cited feminism, postcolonialism, and political geography as major influences on his work, alongside the ideas of Karl Marx and Karl Polanyi. He has linked his intellectual development to political events he witnessed firsthand, including the Pinochet coup in Chile and his time in Belfast and South Africa.

=== New Global Labour Studies (NGLS) ===
In ‘The New Global Labour Studies: A Critical Review’, Marissa Brookes and Jamie K. McCallum, note that Ronaldo Munck probably more than anyone is responsible for the move toward Polanyian themes in the NGLS (New Global Labour Studies). Drawing parallels between the labour movements that successfully re-embedded the market in Polanyi’s time and the transnational labour movement of sixty years later, Munck argues that these movements signal a turning point in the development of modern anti-capitalism. "It may, indeed, simply be the case that the hour of von Hayek is gone, and the hour of Polanyi has arrived" (Munck, 2002: 177–178). Part of the allure of Polanyi’s framework is that it allows for uncoordinated and disaggregated labour movements to reflexively retaliate against the market, much as the body reacts to fight disease. "For each victory of the transnational capitalist class", writes Munck, "there is a new blow struck from below through a strike, a consumer boycott, or a legal challenge to their hegemonic role" (Munck, 2002: 178–179). This perspective gained momentum after the 1999 protests against the World Trade Organization (WTO) in Seattle, where unionists from different countries shared the stage and streets with students, environmentalists, feminists and community groups. The protest helped solidify, if only for a moment, the idea that labour had "moved beyond a conception of transnational collective bargaining" and towards "a more ‘social movement’ unionism’" (Munck, 2002: 154).

This perspective emerged out of the New International Labour Studies (NILS) perspective of the 1980s The fatalism of the Thatcher–Reagan decade saw unions in the industrialised North in decline and social movement unionism gathering momentum in the South. In this milieu, the New International Labour Studies (NILS) movement emerged with a formidable critique of mainstream political economy and global commodity chain approaches, injecting labour into the analysis of globalisation, an area where it had been conspicuously absent (Munck, 1988). NILS proponents assembled a body of literature advancing a theoretical paradigm that expanded the traditional industrial relations outlook to include insights into the uneven geographic division of labour, the social reproduction of inequality, class stratification, informalisation and new identity formation, anticipating some concerns that would later be raised by theorists of union renewal and social movement unionism.

== Overview ==
Munck begins by placing contemporary labor issues in a historical context, charting how capitalism and the global workforce have evolved since the Industrial Revolution and how shifts in markets, technology, and politics shaped workers’ conditions and collective strategies. It moves on to discuss the emergence of a truly global working class, examining both the industrialized economies of the North and postcolonial settings in the South, and illustrates how processes like industrial offshoring and the rise of precarious or informal employment have increasingly linked workers worldwide. In later chapters, the book addresses topics such as the roles of migrant labor and gender, the relationship between labor movements and other social movements, and the potential of renewed labor internationalism in an era marked by volatile global markets. Concluding sections reflect on possible futures for organized labor, suggesting that although neoliberal policies have pressured unions and fragmented workforces, the growing interdependence of global production could also foster more unified labor action.

== Reviews ==
Andreas Bieler recommended the book. With a panoramic view of current labour struggles both in the Global North and South and a detailed analysis of multiple case studies, he believes Munck has contributed the bold idea that capitalist globalization has provided labour with new opportunities for resistance. He commended Munck’s work for invoking a global working class, especially emphasizing the global precariat and migrant labour without neglecting these two significant groups. However, Bieler identified some theoretical problems. He argued that Munck’s overreliance on Polanyi’s notion of a double movement leads him into a theoretical dualism between an 'economy' embedded in social relations and social relations embedded in the 'economy'. Bieler also noted that Munck showed unrealistic optimism about the potential role of the emerging global working class, overlooking current political realities.

In his review, David J. Bailey commended the book’s comprehensive synthesis of extensive research across industrial relations, globalization, capitalism, labour studies, and political economy. Bailey emphasized Munck's argument that neoliberal capitalism has created new opportunities for worker-led resistance globally. Bailey appreciated the truly global scope and stressed the author's attention to trends such as the shift from Fordism to post-Fordism, the rise of social movement unionism combining traditional unions with newer mobilizations like Occupy, and labour movements' increasing internationalism. However, Bailey critiqued Munck for not providing sufficient concrete examples demonstrating how this emerging global labour movement operates in practice and notes the occasional reliance on outdated examples.

Susan Hayter regarded the work as a provocative and insightful contribution to global labour studies, commending its historical scope and critical perspective on the evolution of labour under capitalism. Hayter appreciated the author's integration of Karl Polanyi’s concept of "double movements" and noted that the book "challenges labour scholars and labour activists alike to reclaim historical principles of solidarity." Hayter highlighted the book’s optimistic view of an emerging global labour movement rooted in grassroots initiatives and transnational alliances, while also welcoming its feminist critique and nuanced treatment of labour precarity. She endorsed the book as offering "a project for a future of work that offers working people something better than the populist alternatives," underscoring its aspirational tone and relevance in an era of growing inequality and digital transformation.
