= Andrzej Dembicz =

Andrzej Dembicz (1939 – 29 November 2009) was a Polish scientist and professor of Latin American and Caribbean culture.

He was born in Kowl, Poland.

== Academic career ==
He graduated Institute of Geography of the University of Warsaw, currently the Faculty of Geography and Regional Studies of the University of Warsaw, in 1963. He was interested in rural communities and sugar cane plantations, social regional space building, Identities and regional processes in Latin America, space in Latin American culture, Europe-Latin America relations, intercultural dialogue in the Americas, inter-American processes, Latin American studies in the World.

He worked at the Warsaw University for 40 years. He founded the Center of Latin American Studies at the Warsaw University and he run this center from 1988 until his death in 2009. He was a dean of the faculty for many years. For many years he worked with the Faculty of Geography and Regional Studies at the Warsaw University.

In 2000 he presided at the Organizing Committee of the 50th International Congress of Americanists in Warsaw. Between 2001 and 2007, he was a President of CEISAL, the European Council for Social Studies in Latin America. He ran field studies in many Latin American countries. He was particularly connected with Cuba, Mexico, Peru, Argentina, Brazil and Chile, where he spent many years. In 2002 he was awarded the Brazilian National Order of the Southern Cross, the highest award of the Federative Republic of Brazil.

Publications: Publications together: ca. 330 items including: - books: 39 (authorship, co-authorship, editorial staff) - Books issued abroad: 6 - articles, essays, scientific notes: ca. 190 - articles and essays in foreign journals and publications: ca. 40 - other: ca. 100

== Selected publications ==
- Filozofia poznawania Ameryki : studium idei i koncepcji poznawania i interpretowania Ameryki od czasów najdawniejszych po współczesne studia latynoamerykańskie [Philosophy of American Cognition: a study of ideas and concepts of cognition and interpretation of America from the earliest times to contemporary Latin American studies]
- Ameryka Łacińska : przestrzeń i społeczeństwo: społeczne aspekty przestrzennej koncentracji ludności [Latin America: space and society: social aspects of spatial concentration of population]
- Interculturalidad en América Latina en ámbitos locales y regionales [Interculturality in Latin America at local and regional levels]
- Polskie badania nad Amerykami [Polish Studies on the Americas] (with Z.Lewickim)
- Procesos en Europa Centro-Oriental y América Latina [Processes in Central and Eastern Europe and Latin America] (with Elsa Laurelli)
- Relacje Polska – Brazylia : historia i współczesność [Relations between Poland and Brazil: history and the present day] (with Marcin Kula)
- Relacje Polska – Argentyna: historia i współczesność [Relations between Poland and Argentina: history and the present]
- Słownik terminów geograficznych Ameryki Łacińskiej [Glossary of Latin American geographical terms]
- Kuba [Cuba]
- Ewolucja plantacji : typologiczne studium plantacji trzciny cukrowej na Kubie [Plantation evolution: a typological study of sugarcane plantation in Cuba]

== Bibliography ==
- Odeszli. "UW : Uniwersytet Warszawski". 1 (45), p. 40, January 2010.

Uniwersytet Warszawski. ISSN Diário Oficial da União (DOU) "Ludzie nauki" database, Nauka Polska (OPI). Official page of CESLA UW
