= Edwin Lieuwen =

American historian (1923-1988)

- Born: February 8, 1923
- Died: May 25, 1988 (aged 65); Albuquerque, New Mexico
- Occupations: Historian, professor, author
- Known for: Latin American research

Edwin Lieuwen (February 8, 1923 – May 25, 1988) was an American historian, professor, and author. His area of expertise was focused on Latin America. His work was a major precursor to the establishing of the Latin American Institute.

== Early life and education ==
Born in Harrison, South Dakota on February 8, 1923, he attended the University of California, Berkeley and graduated in 1951 with a PhD. He then received a Fulbright lectureship to attend the University of Utrecht in the Netherlands.

== Career ==
After his return from the Netherlands, he worked for three years as a policy analyst at the United States State Department for three years. In 1957 he was appointed as chairman to the history department as the University of New Mexico. Lieuwen found himself in an academic circle that included France Vinton Scholes as the authority on Latin American studies. His work established the Latin American studies program which would later become the Latin American Institute.

He wrote for the Kirkus Reviews, The Journal of Economic History, Foreign Affairs, and several other academic journals.

He was considered an expert in several Latin-American fields including oil in Venezuela.

== Personal life ==
Lieuwen married Marian Whitehead Lieuwen (1925-2010).

== Death ==
Lieuwen died in 1988 in Albuquerque, New Mexico at the age of sixty-five. He is buried in Sunset Memorial Park.

== Legacy ==
An award was named after Lieuwen by the Rocky Mountain Council for Latin American Studies for exceptional teaching and studies into Latin American policy and relations.

== Books ==
- The Cuban Revolution
- Generals Vs. Presidents: Neo-Militarism in Latin America
- Mexican Militarism: The Political Rise And Fall Of The Revolutionary Army, 1910 1940
- Arms and Politics in Latin America
- Venezuela
- The Role Of The Military In Underdeveloped Countries
