= The Americas (journal) =

Quarterly academic journal

Americas
- Discipline: History
- Language: English
- Edited by: Ben Vinson III

Publication details
- History: 1944–present
- Publisher: Cambridge University Press on behalf of the Academy of American Franciscan History
- Frequency: Quarterly
- Impact factor: 0.229 (2016)

Standard abbreviations
- ISO 4: Americas

Indexing
- ISSN: 0003-1615 (print); 1533-6247 (web)
- OCLC no.: 972340221

Links
- Journal homepage; Online access; Online archive; Online access at Project MUSE

The Americas: A Quarterly Review of Latin American History is a quarterly peer-reviewed academic journal covering political, social, economic, intellectual, and religious history of the Americas. It is published on behalf of the Academy of American Franciscan History by Cambridge University Press and the editor-in-chief is Ben Vinson III (Howard University). The Conference on Latin American History awards an annual prize named for the journal's long-time editor, Antonine Tibesar, O.F.M., for the best article published in the previous year.

The journal is a standard in the field of Latin American studies.

== Abstracting and indexing ==
The journal is abstracted and indexed in:

- Arts and Humanities Citation Index
- Current Contents/Arts & Humanities
- Current Contents/Social & Behavioral Sciences
- European Reference Index for the Humanities and Social Sciences
- ProQuest databases
- Social Sciences Citation Index

According to the Journal Citation Reports, the journal has a 2016 impact factor of 0.229.
