= Robbie Ethridge =

American anthropologist and author (born 1955)

Robbie Franklyn Ethridge (born 1955) is an American anthropologist and author. She is a professor of anthropology at the University of Mississippi.

== Education ==
In 1996, Ethridge received a PhD from the University of Georgia.

== Career ==
She is a founding editor of the journal Native South. She is also the North American associate editor for the journal Ethnohistory.

== Awards and honors ==
She received the Robert C. Anderson Memorial Award for "an outstanding record or research accomplishment" from the University of Georgia, her alma mater, in January 2000. Her 2010 book From Chicaza to Chickasaw, on European impacts on Mississippian culture, won the James Mooney Award from the Southern Anthropological Society.

== Selected publications ==
- The Historical Turn in Southeastern Archaeology. Robbie Ethridge & Eric Bowne, eds., (University Press of Florida, 2020)
- From Chicaza to Chickasaw: The European Invasion and the Transformation of the Mississippian World, 1540–1715 (University of North Carolina Press, 2010)
- Mapping the Mississippian Shatter Zone: The Colonial Indian Slave Trade and Regional Instability in the American South (University of Nebraska Press, 2009) (editor, with Sherri M. Shuck-Hall)
- Light on the Path: The Anthropology and History of the Southeastern Indians (University of Alabama Press, 2006) (editor, with Thomas J. Pluckhahn)
- Creek Country: The Creek Indians and Their World (University of North Carolina Press, 2003)
- The Transformation of the Southeastern Indians, 1540–1760. Robbie Ethridge & Charles Hudson, eds., (University Press of Mississippi, 2002)
- A Promise Kept: The Muscogee (Creek) Nation and McGirt v. Oklahoma
