= Society for Latin American Studies =

British scholastic society

Society for Latin American Studies is based in the United Kingdom and one of Europe's largest organizations of scholars of Latin American studies. It was founded in 1964 and has over 400 members, including diplomats, writers, and researchers in both academia and commercial and non-governmental organisations. SLAS organizes an annual conference and produces the quarterly journal, Bulletin of Latin American Research; it also provides grants to support research and professional activities.
