= Aisha Beliso-De Jesús =

American anthropologist

Aisha M. Beliso-De Jesús is an American anthropologist, academic, author, and editor. She is the Olden Street Professor of American Studies at Princeton University, and chair of the Effron Center for the Study of America. She is the author of two books, Electric Santería: Racial and Sexual Assemblages of Transnational Religion (2015) and Excited Delirium: Race, Police Violence and the Invention of a Disease (2024). Beliso-De Jesús is also the editor-in-chief of Transforming Anthropology.

== Education ==
Beliso-De Jesús received a Bachelor of Arts in Chicano and Latino Studies from University of California, Berkeley. Thereafter, she earned a Master of Arts and a Doctor of Philosophy (PhD) in Cultural and Social Anthropology from Stanford University.

== Career ==
In July 2009, Beliso-De Jesús joined the Harvard Divinity School (HDS) faculty as assistant professor of African American Religions. She later authored Electric Santería: Racial and Sexual Assemblages of Transnational Religion, which won the 2016 Albert J. Raboteau Award for the Best Book in Africana Religions.

After eight years at HDS, where she was Professor of African American Religions, Beliso-De Jesús joined the Princeton University faculty, as a Professor in American Studies. In 2020, she became the director of American Studies, Asian American Studies, and Latino Studies. She is the first chair of the Effron Center for the Study of America at Princeton University. She is also the editor-in-chief of Transforming Anthropology, a journal published by the Association of Black Anthropologists.

Her second book, Excited Delirium: Race, Police Violence and the Invention of a Disease was published by Duke University Press in 2024.

== Bibliography ==
- Electric Santería: Racial and Sexual Assemblages of Transnational Religion, Columbia University Press, 2015, ISBN 9780231539913
