= Blacks and Quakerism: A Preliminary Report =

Anthropological study

"Blacks and Quakerism: A Preliminary Report" is an anthropological study published by Vera Mae Green in 1973. The Friends General Conference, or FGC, requested that Green conduct a study on how Quakerism could attract more Black members to the Society of Friends. After completing the study, she published and discussed her results in a June 1973 meeting of the Friends General Conference. In the study, Green interviewed fourteen respondents to inquire as to why Black Americans were not joining the Society of Friends when seeking out religious groups. In her sample, eleven of the fourteen respondents were African American; six considered themselves to be Quakers. The other three respondents were non-African American Quakers. The study focused on three main research questions: What was the general reaction of Black Americans to Quakerism? Why would someone want to become a member of the Society of Friends? What factors might keep Black Americans away? The study was the first of its kind to use anthropological research to explore the relationship between American Quakers and the Black community.

== Green and Quakerism ==
Green, born in Chicago in 1928, began formally studying anthropology at Columbia and received her master's degree in 1955. She began by studying the relationship between social stress, health, and disease in East Harlem before continuing her anthropological studies of poverty in Puerto Rico. Green's anthropological work was not concentrated in Quakerism. Instead, her doctoral dissertation studied Aruba and focused not on Aruba as a single group of people, but instead as a community of various integrated groups. Green's identity was influenced by her Quakerism, and her work in Quaker studies focused on the diversity and variation in the Black community. She considered herself to be a member of the wider circle of Friends, before petitioning for membership in the 57th Street Meeting of Quakers. In creating "Blacks and Quakerism: A Preliminary Report," Green drew on both her anthropological study of variation in the Black community and Quaker connections, before presenting her study.

== History ==
The Friends General Conference became an annual meeting of the Hicksite Friends groups in Philadelphia, Baltimore, New York, Indiana, Illinois, and Ohio in 1900 intended to foster Quaker faith and inclusivity. In 1973 the Conference was hosted by Earlham in Richmond, Indiana, where Green was invited to share the results of her study. Prior to Green's study, Barrington Dumbar, a member of the 57th Street Quaker Meeting in Chicago published his essay "Black Power's Challenge to Quaker Power." The article was published in the Friends Journal in 1968, four years after he spoke in front of the meeting of the American Friends Service Committee in 1964. After the assassination of Martin Luther King Jr. Dumbar reevaluated the Quaker commitment to nonviolence. He argues that the Black Power movement can be seen naturally in the Quaker belief that there is God in everyone, but that Meetings need to seriously consider how acts of racial violence complicate the nonviolent testimonies of the Society of Friends. He argues that the nonviolent convictions of white Friends make them complicit in racist agendas and acts and calls for Quakers to see Black power as effecting similar goals of peace and justice to those of the Friends. Green's study examined the suggestions made by Dumbar, in order to assess if Black Americans felt the Quaker commitment to nonviolence was prohibitive. Green's findings echo some of the sentiments Dumbar expressed five years prior in his journal article.

== Green's findings ==
Green interviewed fourteen respondents, half in person and half by telephone. Of the eleven Black respondents six identified as Quakers, with five having joined a meeting and one who was a Quaker by birth. In her summaries of the interviews Green notes several trends among the respondents. She notes that Quakerism was seen as an acceptable form of interracial worship, and the seclusion of Quaker meetings often meant they attracted highly educated people. Black Friends reported to be weary of the Quakers until they had extended contact through schooling, camps, and conferences. As a result, Green found that it was primarily educated Black Americans who were most attracted to Quakerism.

Green also reported that Quakers were seen as a more "liberal" religion and preached messages of brotherhood, belonging, and honesty. However, many respondents were wary of the Quaker peace testimony and felt they were too passive for the demands of being Black in America. Quakerism was also seen as isolating, since Friends communities did not establish meetings among Black Americans, making it difficult to find a sense of community within the meeting. Some respondents reported that identifying as a Quaker was seen as abandoning their Black identity and as a means of "integrating" into a largely white society. Friends, especially meeting elders, were not seen as responding quickly enough to calls for action and instead were more passive with issues that did not affect their community directly.

In an era fueled by action and change, Black Americans were not attracted to the Society of Friends, according to Green's study, because the needs of the Black community did not align with the passivity and peace testimony of the Quakers. Green concluded that she doubted Black Americans will ever join Friends meetings in droves, unless the community is centered around Black Meetings and the needs of the Black community both politically and socially.
