= Latin American Politics and Society =

- Discipline: Latin American studies
- Language: English
- Edited by: Alfred P. Montero

Publication details
- Former names: Journal of Inter-American Studies, Journal of Interamerican Studies and World Affairs
- History: 1959–present
- Publisher: Cambridge University Press on behalf of the University of Miami
- Frequency: Quarterly
- Open access: Hybrid
- Impact factor: 1.255 (2020)

Standard abbreviations
- ISO 4: Lat. Am. Politics Soc.

Indexing
- ISSN: 1531-426X (print); 1548-2456 (web)
- LCCN: 2004212043
- JSTOR: 1531426X
- OCLC no.: 943303452
- Journal of Inter-American Studies
- ISSN: 0885-3118
- Journal of Interamerican Studies and World Affairs
- ISSN: 0022-1937

Links
- Journal homepage; Online access; Online archive

Latin American Politics and Society is a quarterly peer-reviewed academic journal of Latin American studies. It is published by Cambridge University Press on behalf of the Center for Latin American Studies of the University of Miami and the editor-in-chief is Alfred P. Montero (Carleton College).

== History ==
The journal was established in 1959 as the Journal of Inter-American Studies. In 1970, the journal changed its title to the Journal of Interamerican Studies and World Affairs, obtaining its current name in 2001.

== Abstracting and indexing ==
The journal is abstracted and indexed in:

- EBSCO databases
- EconLit
- GEOBASE
- International Bibliography of the Social Sciences
- ProQuest databases
- Scopus
- Social Sciences Citation Index

According to the Journal Citation Reports, the journal has a 2020 impact factor of 1.255.
