= Mid-Atlantic Council of Latin American Studies =

The Middle Atlantic Council of Latin American Studies (MACLAS) is a learned society of Mid-Atlantic region scholars, researchers, teachers students and interested professionals in all disciplines and pursuits. This region comprises Delaware, Maryland, New Jersey, New York, Pennsylvania, Virginia, West Virginia, and the District of Columbia. MACLAS has as its objectives promoting and developing interest in Latin American studies and affairs. The organization was founded in Pittsburgh in 1979.

== Activities of MACLAS ==
The annual MACLAS conference features research-based panels and a business meeting.

The association publishes news throughout the year and a refereed journal, Latin American Essays, once each year. The journal is a selection of papers presented at the annual meeting and includes papers from a variety of disciplines, including: Political Science; Anthropology; Economics; History; Languages and Literature; and Pedagogy.

MACLAS also annually awards its Whitaker Prize for the best book, the Davis Prize for best journal article, and Street Prize for the best article in the journal. In addition, two student prizes are awarded for outstanding papers presented at the annual meeting: the Martz Prize for best paper by a graduate student and the Espadas Prize for best paper by an undergraduate student.

== Purpose of MACLAS ==
The purposes of MACLAS are to foster and develop interest in Latin American Studies by scholars, researchers, teachers, students and interested professionals primarily located in the Middle Atlantic region, to encourage more effective training, teaching and research, and to facilitate greater exchange of information and ideas.

MACLAS shares the broad purposes of the Latin American Studies Association and other regional groups but shall not necessarily be bound by their policies.

== Officers and Governance ==
The officers of MACLAS are elected by its members. The 2014-2015 president is Diane E. Johnson, associate professor of politics at Lebanon Valley College.

MACLAS is governed by an Executive Council, elected periodically by its members.

== See also ==
- Latin American Studies
- Latin America
- List of Learned Societies
