= Mexican Studies =

Mexican Studies/Estudios Mexicanos
- Discipline: Multidisciplinary
- Language: English, Spanish
- Edited by: Christian Zlolniski

Publication details
- History: 1985–present
- Publisher: University of California Press on behalf of the University of California Institute for Mexico and the United States and the Universidad Nacional Autónoma de México
- Frequency: Triannual

Standard abbreviations
- ISO 4: Mex. Stud.

Indexing
- ISSN: 0742-9797
- JSTOR: mexistudestumexi

Links
- Journal homepage

Mexican Studies/Estudios Mexicanos is a bilingual, peer-reviewed academic journal covering Mexican studies. Articles in both English and Spanish focus on the history, politics, economy, scientific development, and the literature and arts of Mexico. The journal is published three times a year by University of California Press on behalf of the University of California Institute for Mexico and the United States (UCMEXUS), and the Universidad Nacional Autónoma de México. The current editor-in-chief is Ruth Hellier-Tinoco, who succeeded founding editor, Jaime Rodríguez O. The journal's editorial offices are located at University of California, Santa Barbara.
