= James Rodríguez (disambiguation) =

James Rodríguez (born 1991) is a Colombian footballer.

James Rodríguez may also refer to:

- James Roday Rodriguez (James David Rodriguez, born 1976), American actor
- James H. Rodriguez Elementary, an elementary school in New Mexico, U.S.
- Jaime Rodríguez (1959-2025), El Salvadorian footballer
- Jaime Rodríguez Calderón (born 1957), Mexican politician
