= Antonine Tibesar =

Latino Franciscan friar

Antonine Tibesar, O.F.M. (March 9, 1909 in Quincy, Illinois – March 4, 1992 in San Antonio, Texas) was a Franciscan friar, a scholar of the Catholic Church in Latin America, and director of the Academy of American Franciscan History. He edited four volumes of the writings Junípero Serra, founder of the Franciscan missions in late eighteenth-century Alta California, canonized in 2015. Tibesar served as editor of the peer reviewed scholarly journal, The Americas.

== Career ==
Tibesar was the son of an immigrant to the United States from Luxembourg, and became a Franciscan in 1927 at age 18. He was ordained as a priest seven years later. At the direction of the Franciscan province, he initially earned a Master’s in medieval European history at Catholic University of America in 1937, later returning there and earning a doctorate in Latin American history. His scholarly work first centered on the Franciscan presence in Peru. Doing archival work there, he became interested in the indigenous peoples of the Andes.

After earning his doctorate in 1950, he taught history at Catholic University (1948-1974), as well as serving as the director of the Academy of American Franciscan History, 1954–63 and 1970-82. He was editor of the scholarly journal ‘’The Americas’’, the second leading journal of Latin American history in the United States. The Library of Congress recorded an interview with Tibesar.

Between 1970 and 1988, he edited The Americas: A Quarterly Review of Inter-American Cultural History and was responsible for making it a leading journal of Latin American history in the United States. The Conference on Latin American History, the professional organization of Latin American historians in the U.S., which is affiliated with the American Historical Association, awards an annual prize named for Tibesar for the best article published in the journal in the previous year.

== Scholarly works ==
- "Instructions for the Confessors of Conquistadores Issued by the Archbishop of Lima in 1560." The Americas 3.4 (1947): 514-534.
- "The salt trade among the Montana Indians of the Tarma area of eastern Peru." Primitive Man 23.4 (1950): 103-108.
- "San Antonio de Eneno: A Mission in the Peruvian Montaña." Primitive man 25.1/2 (1952): 23-39.
- Franciscan Beginnings in Colonial Peru (Washington, D.C. 1953).
- The Writings of Junípero Serra (4 volumes), editor, (Washington, D.C. 1955–56).
- "The "Alternativa": A Study in Spanish–Creole Relations in Seventeenth–century Peru" ‘’The Americas’’ (1955) 229–83.
- "A Spy's Report on the Expedition of Jean Ribaut to Florida, 1565." The Americas (1955): 589-592.
- "The Franciscan Doctrinero versus the Franciscan Misionero in Seventeenth–century Peru" The Americas (1957) 115–24.
- "The Franciscan Province of the Holy Cross of Española, 1505–1559" The Americas (1957) 377–89.
- "The Shortage of Priests in Latin America: A Historical Evaluation of Werner Promper's Priesternot in Latein Amerika" The Americas (1966) 413–20.
- "The Peruvian Church at the Time of Independence in the Light of Vatican II."The Americas’' (1970) 349–75.
- "The Lima Pastors, 1750–1820: Their Origins and Studies as Taken from Their Autobiographies" The Americas (1971) 39–56..
- "Raphael María Taurel, Papal Consul General in Lima, Peru, in 1853: Report on Conditions in Peru" ‘’Revista Interamericana de Bibliografía’’ (1981) 36–69.
- "The suppression of the Religious Orders in Peru, 1826-1830 or the King versus the Peruvian Friars: the King won." The Americas 39.2 (1982): 205-239.
- Symbolo Catolico Indiano (1598) by Fr. Luis Jerónimo de Oré. (editor). Lima, Peru.
- "The King and the Pope and the Clergy in the Colonial Spanish-American Empire." The Catholic historical review 75.1 (1989): 91-109.
