= John Frederick Schwaller =

American historian

John Frederick "Fritz" Schwaller is an American historian of Latin America, specializing in colonial Mexico, religion, and indigenous peoples. He has written monographs on religion in Mexico, edited scholarly editions of important colonial Mexican texts, and has coordinated and edited anthologies of articles on religion. His administrative service includes being President of State University of New York at Potsdam from 2006 to 2013 and Director of the Academy of American Franciscan History, 1993–95. He is currently professor of history at University of Albany, State University of New York.

== Education and career ==
Schwaller was born and brought up in Hays, Kansas, but he spent considerable time in Mexico as a youth, travelling with his parents. He attended Grinnell College, graduating with a B.A. in history. He attended graduate school in Spanish at University of Kansas, in Lawrence, earning an M.A. in Spanish, and went on to Indiana University Bloomington, earning a doctorate in history. As a graduate student he spent two years doing research in Mexico and Spain, supported by fellowships.

He taught at Florida Atlantic University from 1979 to 1993, with a joint appointment in History and Languages & Linguistics. He went on to serve as an administrator and faculty member at University of Montana, and University of Minnesota, Morris, and in 2006 became President of SUNY Potsdam. In 2013, he stepped down from administration and returned to full-time teaching at SUNY Albany.

He has been active in promoting connections between scholars through the H-Net listservs for Latin America (H-LATAM) and Nahuatl (H-Nahuatl). He serves on the editorial boards of The Americas and Estudios de Cultura Náhuatl.

== Works ==
=== Monographs ===
- 2019 The Fifteenth Month Aztec History in the Rituals of Panquetzaliztli. University of Oklahoma Press. ISBN 978-0-8061-6276-8
- 2011 The History of the Catholic Church in Latin America. New York University Press. ISBN 978-0814-74003-3
- 1990 Origenes de la riqueza de la Iglesia en México. Fondo de Cultura Económica. ISBN 978-9681-63380-6
- 1987 The Church and Clergy in Sixteenth-Century Mexico. Albuquerque: University of New Mexico Press. ISBN 978-0826-30973-0
- 1985 Origins of Church Wealth in Mexico: Ecclesiastical Finances and Church Revenues, 1523-1600. Albuquerque: University of New Mexico Press. ISBN 978-0826-30813-9
- 1981 Partidos y párrocos bajo la real corona en la Nueva España, siglo XVI. Mexico: Instituto Nacional de Antropología e Historia.

=== Scholarly editions ===
- 2014 The First Letter from New Spain: The Lost Petition of Cortés and His Company, June 20, 1519, with Helen Nader, University of Texas Press. ISBN 978-1477-30763-2
- 1999 A Guide to Confession Large and Small in the Mexican Language (1634). Norman: University of Oklahoma Press. With Barry Sell. ISBN 978-0806-13145-0

=== Edited works ===
- 2005 Francis in the Americas: Essays on the Franciscan Family in North and South America. Berkeley: Academy of American Franciscan History (editor)
- 2003 Sahagún at 500: Essays on the Quincentenary of the Birth of Fr. Bernardino de Sahagún, OFM. Berkeley: Academy of American Franciscan History (editor and contributor). ISBN 978-0883-82304-0
- 2000 The Church in Colonial Hispanic America: A Reader. Wilmington, Delaware: Scholarly Resources (editor). ISBN 978-084-202704-5

=== Reference works ===
- 2001 Nahuatl Manuscripts in Repositories in the United States. Berkeley: Academy of American Franciscan History. ISBN 978-0883-82300-2

== Honors ==
- Doctor of Humane Letters, honoris causa – Grinnell College, 2009
