= Jaime E. Rodríguez O. =

Ecuadorian writer and academic (1940–2022

- Born: Jaime Edmundo Rodríguez Ordóñez; 12 April 1940; Guayaquil, Ecuador
- Died: 27 June 2022 (aged 82); Los Angeles, United States
- Spouse: Linda Alexander Rodríguez

Academic background
- Education: University of Houston, University of Texas at Austin
- Doctoral advisor: Nettie Lee Benson

Academic work
- Discipline: Latin American History, independence-era in Mexico
- Institutions: University of California, Irvine

Jaime Edmundo Rodríguez Ordóñez (born 12 April 1940 – 27 June 2022) was a historian of Latin America, particularly of independence-era Mexico. Born in Ecuador, he was professor emeritus at the University of California, Irvine, in the United States.

== Biography ==
Jaime Edmundo Rodríguez Ordóñez was born in Guayaquil, Ecuador, during his father's military service. Rodríguez Ordóñez was the son of Colonel Luis Rodríguez Sandoval, who had been chief of the frontier zone during the war between Ecuador and Peru. His mother was María Beatriz Ordóñez Córdova. At age 8, he moved to the United States together with his mother, where he has resided permanently. He was married to Linda Alexander Rodríguez.

== Education ==
In 1965 he earned his B.A. in economics at the University of Houston and following year, he earned his M.A. in history also at University of Houston. In 1970, he completed his doctorate at University of Texas, Austin, under the direction of Nettie Lee Benson, with his dissertation on Vicente Rocafuerte and the rise of Latin American identity.

== Academic career ==
He began teaching at California State University, Long Beach, where he remained from 1969 to 1973. In 1974, he began his career at University of California, Irvine, where he taught until his retirement. Between 1980 and 1986, he was Graduate Dean and Vice Chancellor for Research. He was the founding editor of the peer-reviewed journal, Mexican Studies/Estudios Mexicanos, a bilingual, binational journal published jointly with the University of California and the National Autonomous University of Mexico.

In his published work, Rodríguez Ordóñez contended that Latin America was not isolated from events in the rest of the western world, so that it was actively involved in the events of the Atlantic Revolutions. Although the American Revolution and the French Revolution were known throughout the confines of the Spanish monarchy, he argued that they did not directly influence the Spanish territories in the Americas. Rather, Rodríguez suggested that the imprisonment of Ferdinand VII during the Napoleonic invasion of Spain and the subsequent institutional vacuum that this created were the direct causes of the collapse of the Spanish monarchy. It is in this context that countless juntas succeed each other both on the Iberian peninsula and in Spanish America that sought to represent a government free from French influence, but faithful to the Spanish monarch and monarchy as an institution. The distrust of many Americans of peninsular-born Spaniards and that of many peninsulares in the Americans led to civil wars in which in many cases entire families were divided between insurgents and royalists. Rodríguez Ordóñez emphasized the importance of the influence of the 1812 Constitution of Cádiz on Spanish America, especially in New Spain and the Realm of Quito. He contended that this constitution was much more representative and inclusive than many of its contemporaries, including ones from Latin America, which were much more traditional. He stressed the role of elections as a starting point for modern representative governance in Latin America and as one of the reasons why the wars for independence lasted at least a decade.

== Select publications ==
Monographs

- The Emergence of Spanish America: Vicente Rocafuerte and Spanish Americanism: 1808–1832. University of California Press, 1975.
- Revolución, independencia y las nuevas naciones de América. Vol. 9. Fundación MAPFRE Tavera, 2005.
- " We are Now the True Spaniards": Sovereignty, Revolution, Independence, and the Emergence of the Federal Republic of Mexico, 1808–1824. Stanford University Press, 2012.
- La independencia de la América española. Fondo de Cultura Económica, 2016.

Edited and co-authored works

- Editor, The Divine Charter: Constitutionalism and Liberalism in Nineteenth-Century Mexico. Rowman & Littlefield, 2007.
- Co-author with Jaime E. Rodr Guez. The Independence of Spanish America. Vol. 84. Cambridge University Press, 1998.
- Editor. The origins of Mexican national politics, 1808–1847. Rowman & Littlefield, 1997.
- Co-author with MacLachlan." The Forging of the Cosmic Race: A Reinterpretation of Colonial Mexico 223 (1980).

Articles

- "The Process of Spanish American Independence." A Companion to Latin American History (2010): 195–214.
- "New Spain and the 1808 Crisis of the Spanish Monarchy." Mexican Studies/Estudios Mexicanos 24.2 (2008): 245–287.
- "La naturaleza de la representación en Nueva España y México." Secuencia 61 (2005): 6-32.
- "The Struggle for Dominance: the Legislature versus the Executive in Early Mexico." Christon I. Archer (comp.), The Birth of Modern México, Scholarly Resources, Wilmington (2003): 205–228.
- "The emancipation of America." American Historical Review 105.1 (2000): 131–152.
- "The struggle: the first centralist-federalist conflict in Mexico." the Americas 49.1 (1992): 1-22.
- "The origins of the 1832 rebellion." Patterns of contention in Mexican history, Wilmington, SR Books (1992): 145–162.
- "La Constitución de 1824 y la formación del Estado mexicano." Historia mexicana 40.3 (1991): 507–535.
- "Two Revolutions: France 1789 and Mexico 1810." The Americas (1990): 161–176.
- "From Royal Subject to Republican Citizen: The Role of the Autonomists in the Independence of Mexico." Rodríguez O.(coord.) (1989): 19–43.
- "The Conflict between Church and State in Early Republican Mexico." New World 2 (1987): 93-112.
