= Bianca Williams (anthropologist) =

American anthropologist

Bianca Christel Williams (born 1980) is an American cultural anthropologist, feminist, author and academic, whose work centers on black Americans. In November 2016, the American Anthropological Association and the Oxford University Press honored her with the AAA/Oxford University Press Award for Excellence in Undergraduate Teaching of Anthropology. Williams is an associate professor of anthropology at Graduate Center of the City University of New York

== Biography ==
Williams studied cultural anthropology at Duke University, earning a B.A. in 2002, an M.A. in 2005 and a Ph.D. in 2009, as well as a Graduate Certificate in African and African American Studies. In 2009, she was hired as an assistant professor at the University of Colorado Boulder where her courses included coverage of black women, civil rights, the black power movement and "the ethnography of American blackness." She encourages her students to read fiction, poetry and self-help books side-by-side with academic scholarship. In January 2017, she was promoted and received tenure in the Department of Anthropology at the University Colorado, and later that year she was hired as an associate professor at the Graduate Center at the City University of New York. In 2018 she published The Pursuit of Happiness: Black Women, Diasporic Dreams, and the Politics of Emotional Transnationalism.

Williams describes her pedagogical approach in "Radical Honesty: Truth-telling as Pedagogy for Working through Shame in Academic Spaces", a chapter in "Race, Equity, and the Learning Environment" (May 2016) encouraging her students to challenge racist institutional traditions by overcoming shame and fostering change.

== Selected publications ==
- Williams, Bianca C. (2018) The Pursuit of Happiness Black women, Diasporic Dreams, and the Politics of Emotional Transnationalism. Durham: Duke University Press. ISBN 9780822370253. OCLC 1003854784.
- Navarro, Tami; Williams, Bianca C.; Ahmad, Attiya (2013). "Sitting at the Kitchen Table: Fieldnotes from Women of Color in Anthropology". Cultural Anthropology. 28 (3): 443–463. doi:10.1111/cuan.12013.
- Williams, Bianca C. (2009). "'Don't Ride the Bus!' and Other Warnings Women Anthropologists are Given During Fieldwork". Transforming Anthropology. 17 (2): 155. doi:10.1111/j.1548-7466.2009.01052.x. ISSN 1548-7466. S2CID 145168550.
- Williams, Bianca (2013). "Virtual Ethnography". Oxford Bibliographies in Anthropology, Oxford University Press. doi:10.1093/obo/9780199766567-0107.
