= Kamari Maxine Clarke =

Canadian-American anthropologist

Maxine Kamari Clarke (born 3 April 1966) is a Canadian-American scholar with family roots in Jamaica. As of 2020, she is a distinguished professor at the Centre for Criminology & Sociolegal Studies and the Centre for Diaspora & Transnational Studies at the University of Toronto. In 2021, she was named a Guggenheim Fellow.

== Education and career ==
Clarke is a specialist on theories of legal pluralism, international justice, and social theory. She conducts research on rise of the rule of law movement, international courts and tribunals, the export, spread and re-contextualization of international norms, secularism and religious trans-nationalism.

Clarke trained in Canada in political science and international relations as an undergraduate and in the U.S. in anthropology and then in law. She completed her B.A. in political science-international relations at Concordia University in Québec, Canada A few years later, she moved to New York City to pursue her Master of Arts in political anthropology at The New School for Social Research. In September of the same year, she began a doctorate in anthropology at the University of California—Santa Cruz.

In 1999, Clarke relocated to New Haven, Connecticut, to begin a position as an assistant professor in the anthropology department at Yale University. In 2003, she was promoted to associate professor, with tenure by 2007. Two years later, she advanced to the position of full professor with tenure.

During her time as a professor at Yale University, she completed a Master in the Study of Law in 2003. As a professor at Yale, she served as the chairperson of the Council on African Studies (2007-2010) and as the co-founder of the Center for Transnational Cultural Analysis. In 2013, Clarke moved from Yale University and took up a position as a visiting professor at the University of Pennsylvania and then professor at Carleton University in 2015. Between 2004 and 2005, she spent a year at York University as a visiting scholar in the anthropology department and in 2015 as a visiting research professor at the University of Toronto. She was a professor of Global and International studies at Carleton University with cross appointments in Law and Legal Studies, as well as in anthropology, from 2016 to 2018.

Clarke is currently the associate editor of the Cultural Anthropology section of the American Anthropologist.

== Research and publications ==
=== Affective Justice ===
Affective Justice: The International Criminal Court and the Pan-Africanist Pushback was written by Kamari Maxine Clarke and published by Duke University Press in November 2019. Affective Justice explores the African Union's pushback against the ICC in order to theorize affect's role in shaping forms of justice in the contemporary period. Affective Justice was the winner of the 2019 Amaury Talbot Prize for African Anthropology and a finalist for the 2019 AAA's Association for African Anthropology Elliott P. Skinner Book Award.

=== Mapping Yorùbá Networks ===
Mapping Yorùbá Networks was written by Kamari Maxine Clarke and published by the Duke University Press in July 2004. It is an ethnography of Òyótúnjí, an establishment of the ancient Yoruba Empire that was founded in South Carolina in 1970. Mapping Yorùbá Networks draws from fieldwork conducted in the United States and Nigeria and follows “heritage travelers” who voyage from Òyótúnjí to Nigeria and back. The ethnography chronicles the physical, social and economic landscape of Òyótúnjí and explores the dynamics of homeland identification, the roots heritage market and expressions of transnational politics.

=== Fictions of Justice ===
Fictions of Justice: The International Criminal Court and the Challenge of Legal Pluralism in Sub-Saharan Africa was written by Kamari Maxine Clarke and published by Cambridge University Press in May 2009. Clarke explores how the language of international justice is created through the embodiment of values of human rights in rule of law movements. This book presents that justice is legitimized and made real, in specific socio-cultural practices, through micropractices, such as “citation references to treaty documents”.

=== Globalization and Race ===
Globalization and Race: Transformations in the Cultural Production of Blackness was edited by Kamari Maxine Clarke and Deborah A. Thomas. The anthology was published by the Duke University Press in July 2006 and contains essay contributions by Deborah A. Thomas, Lee D. Baker, Robert Lee Adams Jr., Jacqueline N. Brown, Tina M. Campt, Naomi Pabst, Kesha Fikes, Isar Godreau, John L. Jackson, Jayne O. Ifekwunigwe, Grant Farred, Ariana Hernandez-Reguant, Oneka LaBennet, Raymond Codrington, Len Sawyer and Kamari Maxine Clarke. The collection of essays examines how globalization relates to changing conceptualizations and expressions of blackness. In studying race as an analytic category and connecting it to ethnicity, gender, sexuality, nationality and religion, Globalization and Race discusses how global transformations have led to the creation of new class economies and ideologies about belonging and constructions of social difference.

=== Transforming Ethnographic Knowledge ===
Transforming Ethnographic Knowledge was edited by Rebecca Hardin and Kamari Maxine Clarke and published by The University of Wisconsin Press in August 2012. A team of anthropologists consisting of Mary Catherine Bateson, Kamari Maxine Clarke, Rebecca Hardin, Csilla Kalocsai, Macia Inhorn, George Marcus, J. Lorand Matory, Sidney Mintz and Melissa Remis, explore the changes they have witnessed in ethnography, as a method and as an intellectual approach. The authors demonstrate how ethnography is relevant in understanding and bringing about social change while also transforming the practitioners themselves.

=== Africa and the ICC: Perceptions of Justice ===
Africa and the ICC: Perceptions of Justice was edited by Kamari M. Clarke, Abel S. Knottnerus and Efje de Volder. It was published by Cambridge University Press in 2016. This book contains contributions about the relationship between Africa and the ICC from the perspectives of scholars of various disciplines, such as, international law, cultural anthropology, media studies, political science and African history.

=== The African Court of Justice and Human and Peoples' Rights in Context ===
The African Court of Justice and Human and Peoples' Rights in Context is edited by Charles C. Jalloh, Kamari M. Clarke, and Vincent O. Nmehielle. It is scheduled to be published in April 2019 by Cambridge University Press. The book is a series of analyses about the Malabo Protocol, which would create the African Court of Human and Peoples' Rights. This book explores how this court could interact with larger contexts of international law.

== Civic and political service ==
=== Engaged Anthropology ===
In 2014, Kamari M. Clarke received the Wenner Gren Foundation for Anthropological Research for the Engaged Anthropology Grant that provided funding for her to travel with her project collaborators to Addis Ababa, Ethiopia, home of the African Union Commission. to share "her research on the International Criminal Court and international law in African contexts” The Wenner Gren Foundation is a private foundation that funds international anthropological research. The project for which Kamari M. Clarke was awarded the grant, is titled the African Geographies of Justice Engaged Anthropology project, which centered on an international criminal workshop African Geographies of Justice: African Court and Heads of State Immunities. This workshop took place from November 19 to 21, 2014 at the Hilton Hotel in Addis Ababa. The purpose of the workshop was to explore questions surrounding the controversial African Court and heads of state immunities provision of the Malabo Protocol

=== LEAD ===
Leadership Enterprise for African Development is a research and capacity building institute that leveraged research and expertise from the world's leading institutions, such as Harvard and Yale Universities, to strengthen knowledge, leadership and governance capacity in the African public, business, and civil society sectors.

=== ACRI Expert for the African Union ===
The African Court Research Initiative (ACRI) is a collaborative endeavor that explores the academic and functional implications of the creation of an African Court of Justice and Human and Peoples’ Rights. ACRI studies and publishes reports on how this new court should be implemented and how it could work in relation to other mechanisms of international justice. It is a joint initiative by Kamari Maxine Clarke, Charles C. Jalloh, a professor at the Florida International University College of Law, and Vincent O. Nmehielle, the legal Counsel and Director of Legal Affairs in the African Union Commission.

== Selected grants and awards ==
- 2021 Guggenheim Fellowship
- Social Sciences and Humanities Research Council of Canada Insight Grant (2020)
- National Science Foundation Grant (2020)
- UCLA Transdisciplinary Research Acceleration Grant (2020)
- Recipient, 2019 Royal Anthropological Institute's Amaury Talbot Book Prize for Affective Justice: The International Criminal Court and the Pan-Africanist Push-back
- Finalist, 2019 AAA's Association for African Anthropology Elliott P. Skinner Book Award Finalist for Affective Justice: The International Criminal Court and the Pan-Africanist Push-back
- Wenner-Gren Foundation for Anthropological Research - $19,200 (2017-2020)
- Carleton University Faculty of Public Affairs Research Excellence Award (2017–18)
- Open Society Foundation Grant for Engaged Research on the African Union Commission in Addis Ababa, Ethiopia Involving Technical Analysis of the Malabo Protocol. Co-PI (with Charles Jalloh) Phase I – USD $110,000; and Phase II – USD $246,000
- Wenner-Gren Foundation Research Award (2009-2011)
- National Science Foundation (2012)
