= Jaime Rodríguez Espoz =

Chilean judge

Jaime Rodríguez

Personal details
- Born: 27 May 1937 (age 89) Chuquicamata, Chile
- Education: Pontifical Catholic University of Valparaíso (BA)
- Profession: Lawyer

Jaime Rodriguez Espoz (born 27 May 1937) is a Chilean lawyer who served as minister of the Supreme Court.

== Biography ==
From 1944 to 1947, he carried out his basic studies at the San Juan Bosco Salesian High School in Santiago. His secondary studies were carried out at the Chacabuco de Los Andes Institute (Hnos. Maristas) from 1948 to 1953.

In 1956, he entered the Pontifical Catholic University of Valparaíso School of Law, in which he graduated in 1961. His memoir of degree, «The worker in large copper mining», was approved in 1965. He obtained his law degree on 10 January 1966.

In 1995, he obtained a Post-graduate diploma from the University of Valparaíso after finishing his thesis «The independence of the Judicial Power».
