= Rocky Mountain Council for Latin American Studies =

Academic organization

Rocky Mountain Council for Latin American Studies is a regional Latin American studies association founded in 1954. It meets annually at varying locations in the Southwest of the U.S.

== History ==
The Pan American Union was an early force in the creation of regional Latin American area studies associations of which RMCLAS is one, and the Pacific Coast Council on Latin American Studies (PCCLAS) is another. The 1954 founding of RMCLAS antedates the 1966 formation of the Latin American Studies Association. In 1955, RMCLAS adopted a constitution and elected officers for the new organization. Its main activity is its annual meeting. Plans for a journal connected to the association did not come to fruition. The membership of RMCLAS steadily increased from its early small numbers in its early years and then growth in the 1970s. An important demographic change was the expansion in the number of female academics participating.

The 2016 annual meeting in Santa Fe, N.M. had 74 panels with 269 participants. RMCLAS encourages participants from a variety of fields, “including, but not limited to Anthropology, Archaeology, Art History, Cultural Studies, Economics, Environmental Studies, Ethnomusicology, Film Studies, Gender Studies, History, Linguistics, Literature, Political Science, and Sociology.” Although nominally a regional meeting, participants came from universities all over the U.S., as well as some from Mexico, Canada, and Europe. The wide geographical draw of the meeting is of long standing. Meetings have been held in New Mexico, Arizona, Colorado, and Utah.

The organization awards a number of named prizes awarded at its annual meeting.

== Prizes ==
- Adrian Bantjes Prize for Best Graduate Student Paper
- Adolph Bandelier/Asunción Lavrin Book Prize in Colonial Latin American History, “named to honor two pioneers in the history of the Spanish American empire, the first working in the early days of the field, the second who forged a path in colonial history and served as a model for female historians in the profession, this prize is awarded to the outstanding book published by a member of the association in the previous calendar year on the subject of colonial Latin American history.”
- Theo Crevenna/Louis Sadler Award for Outstanding Service
- Judith Ewell Award for Best Publication on Women’s History, named University of New Mexico PhD Judith Ewell, who contributed to the development of women's history in Latin America.
- Edwin Lieuwen Award for the Promotion of Excellence in the Teaching of Latin American Studies
- Thomas F. McGann Book Prize in Modern Latin American History," named for Thomas F. McGann (1920-1982), professor of history at University of Texas.
- Michael C. Meyer Award for Best Book on Mexican History in a Five-Year Period

== Website ==
- Official website
