= Bulletin of Latin American Research =

Bulletin of Latin American Research is a quarterly peer-reviewed academic journal covering research on Latin American studies, including Latin America, the Caribbean, inter-American relations, and the Latin American diaspora. The journal title has been published by Wiley-Blackwell since 1981.
