= Latin American Perspectives =

- Discipline: Latin American studies
- Language: English
- Edited by: Ronald H. Chilcote

Publication details
- History: 1974–present
- Publisher: Sage Publishing on behalf of the University of California, Riverside
- Frequency: Bimonthly

Standard abbreviations
- ISO 4: Lat. Am. Perspect.

Indexing
- ISSN: 0094-582X (print); 1552-678X (web)
- LCCN: 74645710
- OCLC no.: 1794709

Links
- Journal homepage

Latin American Perspectives is a peer-reviewed academic journal associated with the University of California, Riverside that focuses on Latin American studies regarding capitalism, imperialism, socialism and their relation to political economy.

== History ==
After the Latin American Studies Association called in 1970 for a journal focusing on various viewpoints to be founded, Latin American Perspectives was founded in 1974 by Ronald Chilcote, who sought to create a scholarly publication on Latin America containing material from multiple perspectives, Chilcote's wife Frances, Bill Bollinger, Donald William and Marjorie Woodford Bray, and Tim Harding all from California State University, Los Angeles, Norma Stoltz Chinchilla of the University of California, Irvine, Michael Kearney of the University of California, Riverside, Richard Harris of the University of California, Santa Barbara, and Nora Hamilton of the University of Southern California.

In 1991, the journal's article "Voices of the Voiceless in Testimonial Literature" first provided a scholarly debate surrounding the cultural acceptance of literature provided by overlooked social groups in Latin America. Following a 1996 conference discussing race in Latin America, Helen Safa was sponsored by the Rockefeller Foundation to stay one of their fellowship centers in Triangolo lariano, Italy, to edit "Race and National Identity in the Americas", a special issue of Latin American Perspectives. In 1997, the journal published one of the first detailed works focusing on the media in Argentina during the Dirty War.

== Reception and impact ==
EBSCO Information Services lists Latin American Perspectives as one of its key academic journals specialized on Latin America. In the Journal of Contemporary Asia, Jack Arn wrote that most authors in the journal support the dependency theory. Reforma wrote that the journal publishes articles that "make the recent history of Mexico known to the American public." According to Carmen Diana Deere, Latin American Perspectives performs better in the SCImago Journal Rank when compared to the Impact factor calculation, with Deere saying that "Scopus includes a much larger number of journals, and many more from Latin America where its articles are more likely to be cited." In 2022, the Latin American Studies Association awarded the journal's founder Ronald Chilcote the Kalman Silvert Award, its most distinguished award.
