= Latin American studies =

Academic interdisciplinary field

Latin American studies (LAS) is an academic and research field associated with the study of Latin America. The interdisciplinary study is a subfield of area studies, and can be composed of numerous disciplines such as economics, sociology, history, international relations, political science, geography, cultural studies, gender studies, and literature.

== Definition ==
Latin American studies critically examines the history, culture, international relations, and politics of Latin America. It is not to be confused with Latino studies, an academic discipline which studies the experience of people of Latin American ancestry in the United States. The emergence of a Latin American scholarly focus departed to a degree from Spain-centric views of regions that had been part of the Spanish Empire. As Jeffrey Herlihy-Mera describes in Decolonizing American Spanish, the rise of Latin American Studies decentralized the Eurocentric nature of scholarship across several fields: "At once a radical and democratizing thrust, the move localized a hemispheric shift in intellectual focus and had profound influences on the central tenets of the disciplines, on the institutions involved (departments, universities, publications, professional associations, and so on), on the structural presumptions that organize knowledge-production, and on the latitude of subjectivities that may be conceptualized and institutionalized. While many of the pre–Latin American studies methodologies remain (including the centrality of literature, foregrounding the national/transnational as a meaningful container of culture, and periodization exigencies), the move toward Latin America localized the themes and subjects that appeared in US classrooms, deconstructing some of the Eurocentric supremacy of the traditional model."

Latin Americanists consider a variety of perspectives and employ diverse research tools in their work. The interdisciplinary disciplines of study varies, depending on the school, association, and academic program. For example, the Latin American Centre of the School of Interdisciplinary Area Studies (SIAS) at the University of Oxford heavily focuses on the social sciences, such as the economics, politics, and development of the region. The Center for Latin American Studies at the University of Arizona also focuses on social sciences with faculty from Anthropology, Geography, Political Science, Sociology, and History an places emphasis on issues related to anti-racism, human rights, security, environment and health. On the other hand, schools like Teresa Lozano Long Institute of Latin American Studies (LLILAS) at The University of Texas at Austin, focus on the humanities; with the language, culture, and history of Latin America as a central component. Others include the study of environment and ecology of the region.

Latin American studies is usually quite open and often includes or is closely associated with, for instance, Development studies, Geography, Anthropology, Caribbean studies, and Transatlantic studies.

== History ==
Latin America has been studied in one way or another ever since Columbus's voyage of 1492. In the eighteenth and nineteenth centuries, scientist explorers such as Alexander von Humboldt published extensively about the region. Toward the end of the nineteenth century and at the turn of the twentieth, within the region itself writers such as José Martí and José Enrique Rodó encouraged a consciousness of regional identity.

In 1875, the International Congress of Americanists held its first meeting in Nancy, France, and has met regularly ever since, alternating between venues in Europe and in the Western hemisphere. However, unlike the scholarly organizations of the twentieth century, the ICA does not have an ongoing organization, nor is there a journal of the ICA. The creation of formal and ongoing scholarly organizations focusing on Latin America is a product of the twentieth century.

In the United States, historians with an interest in Latin American history within the American Historical Association created a group focusing on Latin America. In 1918, they founded The Hispanic American Historical Review, which has published quarterly since that time and has built a reputation as one of the premier scholarly journals. The Latin Americanists within the AHA created the Conference on Latin American History in 1926, which is now separately incorporated (since 1964), but continues to coordinate its annual meetings with the American Historical Association. In 1936, Latin Americanists in the United States also founded the Handbook of Latin American Studies, with editorial offices in the Hispanic Division of the Library of Congress. In a pre-digital era, the compilation of annotated bibliographic references in the humanities and social science organized by subject and country was a vital tool for scholars in the field. In 1954 was founded in Paris the Institute for Advanced Latin American Studies (IHEAL), by the geographer Pierre Monbeig.

With the Cuban Revolution of 1959, the US government began seriously focusing on Latin America as Cuba and the hemisphere was seen to be an integral element of Cold War politics. The Latin American historian who wrote the early history of the founding of the Latin American Studies Association wryly suggested in 1966 that at some future date Latin Americanists should erect a statue to Fidel Castro, the "remote godfather" of the field, who instigated a renewed US interest in the region.

Interest in Latin American studies increased starting in the 1950s. In the United States, Latin American studies (like other area studies) was boosted by the passing of Title VI of the National Defense Education Act (NDEA) of 1958, which provided resources for Centers of Area and International Studies.International Education Programs Service - The History of Title VI and Fulbright-Hays: An Impressive International Timeline In the UK, the 1965 "Parry Report" provided similar impetus for the establishment of Institutes and Centres of Latin American Studies at Oxford, London, Cambridge, and Liverpool. In Canada, York University in Toronto established the first Latin American center, "in part thanks to the inflow of exiled intellectuals from South America." Germany's Ibero-Amerikanisches Institut in Berlin had been founded in 1930, but not until the 1970s did it experience expansion.

== Associations ==
- Brazilian Studies Association
- Conference on Latin American History (CLAH)
- Canadian Association for Latin American and Caribbean Studies (founded 1969)
- Consortium of Latin American Studies Programs (CLASP)
- Latin American Studies Association (US, founded 1966)
- Mid-Atlantic Council of Latin American Studies (US, founded 1979)
- Pacific Coast Council of Latin American Studies (PCCLAS) (US)
- Rocky Mountain Council for Latin American Studies (RMCLAS) (US, founded 1954)
- Seminar on the Acquisition of Latin American Library Materials (SALALM), established 1967
- Society for Irish Latin American Studies (Ireland, founded 2003)
- Society for Latin American Studies (UK), established 1964
- Southeast Council of Latin American Studies (US, founded 1953)

== Bibliographic resources ==
- Handbook of Latin American Studies, established 1936
- Hispanic American Periodicals Index (HAPI)
- Latin American, Caribbean, U.S. Latinx, and Iberian Online Free E-Resources (LACLI).

== Reference works ==
- Encyclopedia of Latin American History and Culture

== Journals ==
- The Americas, established 1944
- Bulletin of Latin American Research, established 1981
- Canadian Journal of Latin American and Caribbean Studies, established 1976
- Colonial Latin American Historical Review, established 1992
- Colonial Latin American Review, established 1992
- European Review of Latin American & Caribbean Studies
- The Hispanic American Historical Review, established 1918, published by Conference on Latin American History
- Historia Mexicana, established 1951
- Journal of Interamerican Studies and World Affairs
- Journal of Latin American Cultural Studies, established 1996
- Journal of Latin American Studies established 1969
- Journal of Politics in Latin America
- Latin American Perspectives, established in 1974
- Latin American Politics and Society, established 1959
- Latin American Research Review (published by the Latin American Studies Association)
- The Latin Americanist, published by Wiley-Blackwell and the Southeast Council of Latin American Studies
- Mexican Studies/Estudios Mexicanos, established 1985
- NACLA Report on the Americas
- Ñawpa Pacha, Journal of Andean Archaeology, established 1963
- Problems of Latin America
- Revista Mexicana de Ciencias Políticas y Sociales/Mexican Journal of Political and Social Sciences, established in 1955

== Programs ==
- Center for Latin American & Caribbean Studies (CLACS) at the University of Illinois
- Center for Latin American Studies (CLACS) at Stanford University
- Georgetown University School of Foreign Service, Center for Latin American Studies
- The University of Texas at Austin - Teresa Lozano Long Institute of Latin American Studies (LLILAS), Austin, Texas
- Center for Latin American and Caribbean Studies (CLACS), New York University
- The Institute of Latin American Studies (ILAS), Columbia University
- Centre of Latin American Studies, University of Cambridge
- Centre of Latin American Studies, University of Oxford
- David Rockefeller Center for Latin American Studies (DRCLAS) at Harvard University
- Latin American and Caribbean Studies, The Henry M. Jackson School of International Studies, University of Washington
- Center for Latin American and Caribbean Studies (CLACS) at Indiana University
- Center for Latin American Studies at the University of Pittsburgh
- Center for Latin American Studies at the University of Arizona
- The Center for Latin American and Caribbean Studies, University of Michigan
- Centro de Estudios Latinoamericanos, Mexico
- Latin America, Caribbean and US Latino Studies University at Albany - State University of New York, Albany, New York
- Institute of Latin American Studies (IHEAL), University of Sorbonne Nouvelle Paris 3.
- Ibero-American Institute, Berlin
- Institute of Latin American Studies, London
- University of Florida Center for Latin American Studies
- Latin American Institute, University of California, Los Angeles
- Center for Latin American Studies, University of Chicago
- University of California, Santa Barbara Latin American and Iberian Studies program
- University of New Mexico, Latin American & Iberian Institute
- Latin American Studies Division, CCUS&LAS, School of International Studies, Jawaharlal Nehru University, New Delhi, India
- Centre for Latin American Studies, Faculty of Social Sciences, Goa University, Panaji, Goa, India.
- Roger Thayer Stone Center for Latin American Studies at Tulane University

== Research libraries and archives outside Latin America ==
- Bancroft Library, University of California, Berkeley
- Benson Latin American Collection, University of Texas Library, Austin, Texas
- Bibliotheque Nationale de France, Paris
- John Carter Brown Library, Providence, Rhode Island
- Center for Research Libraries
- Dumbarton Oaks, Washington, D.C.
- Hispanic Society of America, New York City
- Huntington Library, San Marino, California
- Library of Congress, Washington, D.C.
- Newberry Library, Chicago
- Oliveira Lima Library, Catholic University, Washington, D.C.
- Tulane University Library, New Orleans, Louisiana
- University of Florida Library, Gainesville, Florida
- Santa Barbara Mission Archive-Library, Santa Barbara CA
- British libraries.

== Some notable Latin Americanists ==
See also Category:Latin Americanists

- Jeremy Adelman, historian
- Ida Altman, historian
- Nettie Lee Benson, historian
- Carmen Bernand, historian and anthropologist
- Leslie Bethell, historian
- John Beverley
- Elizabeth Hill Boone, anthropologist
- Woodrow Borah, historian
- David Brading, historian
- Victor Bulmer-Thomas, historian
- Louise Burkhart, anthropologist
- Robert N. Burr, historian
- David Bushnell, historian
- David Carrasco, anthropologist
- Howard F. Cline, historian
- John Coatsworth, historian
- Antonio Cornejo Polar
- Daniel Cosío Villegas, historian
- Nigel Davies, historian and anthropologist
- Andrzej Dembicz, geographer
- Ariel Dorfman
- Georgette Dorn, historian and librarian
- James Dunkerley
- Arturo Escobar
- Nancy Farriss, historian
- Ada Ferrer, historian
- Lillian Estelle Fisher, historian
- Albert Fishlow, economist
- John Foran, sociologist
- Jean Franco
- Néstor García Canclini
- Manuel Antonio Garretón
- Peter Gerhard, historical geographer
- Charles Gibson, historian
- Federico Gil
- Adolfo Gilly, historian
- Roberto González Echevarría
- Paul Gootenberg, historian
- Richard Graham, historian
- Greg Grandin, historian
- Andre Gunder Frank
- Tulio Halperín Donghi, historian
- Lewis Hanke, historian
- Clarence Haring, historian
- Doris Heyden, Mesoamericanist
- Albert O. Hirschman, economist
- Robin Humphreys, historian
- Daniel James, historian
- Friedrich Katz, historian
- Herbert S. Klein, historian, Stanford University
- Alan Knight, historian
- Enrique Krauze, historian
- George Kubler, historian
- Jacques Lafaye, historian
- Kris Lane, historian
- Neil Larsen
- Asunción Lavrin, historian
- Miguel León-Portilla, historian
- Irving A. Leonard, historian
- Oscar Lewis, anthropologist
- Edwin Lieuwen, historian
- James Lockhart, historian
- Claudio Lomnitz, anthropologist
- John Lynch, historian
- Murdo J. MacLeod, historian
- Alan McPherson, historian
- Florencia Mallon, historian
- Sylvia Molloy
- Alberto Moreiras
- Richard McGee Morse, historian
- June Nash, anthropologist
- Zelia Nuttall, anthropologist
- Guillermo O'Donnell
- J.H. Parry, historian
- Gustavo Pérez Firmat
- James Petras
- Stafford Poole, historian
- Philip Wayne Powell, historian
- Mary Louise Pratt, historian
- Ángel Rama, writer, literary critic
- Robert Redfield, anthropologist
- Andrés Reséndez, historian
- Darcy Ribeiro, Brazilian anthropologist
- Nelly Richard, cultural theorist
- Antonius Robben, anthropologist
- David Rock, historian
- Riordan Roett, political scientist
- John Howland Rowe, anthropologist
- Beatriz Sarlo, literary and cultural critic
- Carl O. Sauer, historical geographer
- Linda Schele, anthropologist
- France Vinton Scholes, historian
- Stuart B. Schwartz historian
- Rebecca J. Scott, historian
- Patricia Seed, historian
- Donald Shaw, writer, literary critic
- Kalman H. Silvert first president of the Latin American Studies Association
- Thomas Skidmore, political scientist
- Peter H. Smith, historian and political scientist
- Alfred Stepan, political scientist
- William B. Taylor, historian
- Michael Taussig, anthropologist
- J. Eric S. Thompson, anthropologist
- Alain Touraine
- Ann Twinam, historian
- Victor L. Urquidi
- Arturo Valenzuela, political scientist
- Eric Van Young, historian
- Evon Vogt, anthropologist
- Charles Wagley, historian
- Robert Wauchope, archaeologist
- David J. Weber, historian
- Barbara Weinstein, historian
- Henry Wells, political scientist
- Nathan Whetten, sociologist
- Laurence Whitehead, political scientist
- Eric Wolf, anthropologist
- John Womack, historian
- Peter Winn
- Leopoldo Zea, Mexican philosopher

== See also ==
- Latino/a studies
- Chicano Studies
- Caribbeanist
- Conference on Latin American History
- Historiography#Latin America
- History of Latin America
- Criticism of the term Latino
- Latinobarómetro
