= France Vinton Scholes =

American historian (1897–1979)

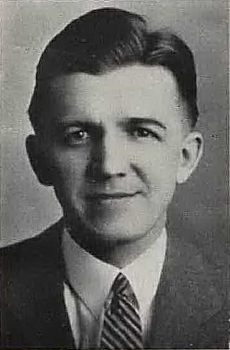
- Born: January 26, 1897; Bradford, Illinois, U.S.
- Died: February 11, 1979 (aged 82); Albuquerque, New Mexico, U.S.
- Occupations: Historian, professor, author
- Known for: Latin American research

France Vinton Scholes (January 26, 1897 – February 11, 1979) was an American scholar and historian noted for his research on the history of New Spain, especially Spanish Yucatán and Southwestern United States.

Much of his research was conducted in the General Archive of the Indies in Seville, Spain, where he was sent in 1935 by the Carnegie Institute of Washington, D.C., as part of a larger study on the Yucatán which was led by Alfred Kidder. In 1940, the study on Yucatán lost financial support from the Carnegie Institute and much of the literature and research was transferred over to the Library of Congress of the United States in the city of Washington.

He served for over sixty years in academia specializing in the field of historical research. He studied at Harvard University. He lectured at Radcliffe College; at the Massachusetts Institute of Technology and Colorado College. After working for the Carnegie Institute, he taught at the University of New Mexico. Scholes published more than fifty publications on the history of New Mexico in the seventeenth century; Mayan and Mesoamerica society during the Spanish colonization and conquest of Mexico, during the same period.

According to J. Eric S. Thompson, Scholes was "among the giants in this century in Maya Studies."

He died in Albuquerque, New Mexico, on February 11, 1979.

== Works ==
Among other books, he published:

- Documents relating to Mirones expedition to the inside of Yucatan 1621-1624 (1936)
- The beginning of the Indian Hispanic society in Yucatan (1937)
- Don Diego Quijada, mayor of Yucatan (1938)
- Documents for the history of Yucatan, in three volumes (1936–1938)
- Acalán Chontals Tixchel, co-authored with Ralph L. Roys, Eleanor Adams and Robert S. Chamberlin. Translated by H. Mario Ruz Sosa (1996 translation)

From 1955 to 1961 he published several papers on the history of New Spain. Before he died he wrote about the life of Hernán Cortés, leaving an unfinished book and giving the manuscript to the University of Tulane.
