= Women's studies =

Academic field that places women's lives and experiences at the center of study

Women's studies is an academic field that draws on feminist and interdisciplinary methods to place women's lives and experiences at the center of study, while examining social and cultural constructs of gender; systems of privilege and oppression; and the relationships between power and gender as they intersect with other identities and social locations such as race, sexual orientation, socio-economic class, and disability.

Popular concepts that are related to the field of women's studies include feminist theory, standpoint theory, intersectionality, multiculturalism, transnational feminism, social justice, Matrixial gaze, affect studies, agency, bio-politics, materialism, and embodiment. Research practices and methodologies associated with women's studies include ethnography, autoethnography, focus groups, surveys, community-based research, discourse analysis, and reading practices associated with critical theory, post-structuralism, and queer theory. The field researches and critiques different societal norms of gender, race, class, sexuality, and other social inequalities.

Women's studies is related to the fields of gender studies, feminist studies, and sexuality studies, and more broadly related to the fields of cultural studies, ethnic studies, and Africana studies.

As of 2015, women's studies courses were offered in over seven hundred institutions in the United States, and globally in more than forty countries.

== History ==
=== Africa ===
The erasure of women and their activities in Africa was complex. When women's studies emerged in the 1980s, it focused on recovering women from the obscurity of all of African history caused by colonialism and the "patriarchal social systems" left behind in Africa after decolonization. Because systems prevailed that supported boys' education over that of girls, in the era following independence, there were few women who could read and write. Those who could were not encouraged to become professionals and often resorted to activism to address educational and other disadvantages women faced in the 1960s and 1970s. The first generation of scholars focused on establishing and legitimizing Africa's precolonial history. They also questioned whether the Western construct of gender applied in Africa or whether the concepts of gender existed in precolonial Africa.

Ifi Amadiume's work Male Daughters, Female Husbands (1987) and Oyeronke Oyewumi's The Invention of Women (1997) are some of the first works that sought to examine gender perceptions in Africa. In 1977, the Association of African Women for Research and Development (AAWORD) was established to promote research on African women by African women. Scholars affiliated with the organization from its founding included: Simi Afonja (Nigeria), N'Dri Thérèse Assié-Lumumba (Ivory Coast), (Bolanle Awe (Nigeria), Nawal El Saadawi (Egypt), Nina Mba (Nigeria), Omolara Ogundipe-Leslie (Nigeria), Achola Pala Okeyo (Kenya), Filomena Steady (Sierra Leone), Fatou Sow (Senegal), and Zenebework Tadesse (Ethiopia). Other scholars joined Development Alternatives with Women for a New Era (DAWN), a network for feminist academics and activists focused on the Global South, created in 1984. African scholars among DAWN's founding members were Fatema Mernissi (Morocco), Pala Okeyo (Kenya), and Marie-Angélique Savané (Senegal). These scholars inspired a second group of researchers and activists, which included: Rudo Gaidzanwa (Zimbabwe), Ayesha Imam (Nigeria), Patricia McFadden (Eswatini), Amina Mama (Nigeria), Takyiwaa Manuh (Ghana), Maria Nzomo (Kenya), and Charmaine Pereira (Nigeria). The University of Ghana established the Development and Women's Studies Program (DAWS) in 1989, which by 1996 offered both undergraduate and graduate level studies. After the demise of Apartheid, the University of Cape Town, South Africa established the African Gender Institute in 1996 to facilitate research and gender studies in Africa. By 2003, full departments dedicated to gender and women's studies had also been established at Makerere University (Uganda), the University of Buea (Cameroon), and the University of Zambia (Zambia).

=== Americas ===
Dr. Annette K. Baxter (1926-1983), the inaugural Adolph S. and Effie Ochs Professor of History at Barnard College, taught The History of Women in America at Barnard in 1966; it was one of the first Women's Studies college courses offered in the United States. Dr. Baxter continued to teach the course during her 31 years at Barnard.The first accredited women's studies course in the U.S. was held in 1969 at Cornell University. After a year of intense organizing of women's consciousness raising groups, rallies, petition circulating, and operating unofficial or experimental classes and presentations before seven committees and assemblies, the first women's studies program in the United States was established in 1970 at San Diego State College (now San Diego State University). In conjunction with National Women's Liberation Movement, students and community members created the ad hoc committee for women's studies. The second women's studies program in the United States was established in 1971 at Wichita State University in Wichita, Kansas. It was largely formed through the efforts of many women in the English department, the administration, and the community. The College of Staten Island was the first United States University to graduate a student with a Bachelor of Arts degree in Women's Studies due to efforts by feminist professor Phyllis Chesler. By 1974, San Diego State University faculty members began a nationwide campaign for the integration of the department. At the time, these actions and the field were extremely political. Before formalized departments and programs, many women's studies courses were advertised unofficially around campuses and taught by women faculty members – without pay – in addition to their established teaching and administrative responsibilities. Then, as in many cases today, faculty who teach in women's studies often hold faculty appointments in other departments on campus.

The first scholarly journal in interdisciplinary women's studies, Feminist Studies, began publishing in 1972. The National Women's Studies Association (of the United States) was established in 1977.

In 1977, there were 276 women's studies programs nationwide in the United States. The number of programs increased in the following decade, growing up to 530 programs in 1989, which included the program at the University of Puerto Rico founded by Margarita Benítez in 1986. Around the 1980s, universities in the U.S. saw the growth and development of women's studies courses and programs across the country while the field continued to grapple with backlash from both conservative groups and concerns from those within the women's movement about the white, existentialist, and heterosexual privilege of those in the academy.

In Canada, the first few university courses in Women's Studies were taught in the early 1970s. In 1984, the federal government established five regional endowed chairs in Women's Studies for each region of the country:

- Simon Fraser University (British Columbia),
- University of Winnipeg and University of Manitoba (Prairies, joint chair)
- Carleton University and the University of Ottawa (Ontario, joint chair),
- Université Laval (Québec), and
- Mount St Vincent University (Atlantic Canada).

Around the same time, women academics in Latin America began to form women's studies groups. The first chair of women's studies in Mexico was created in the political and social sciences faculty of the National Autonomous University of Mexico in 1970. Starting in 1979, the Grupo Autónomo de Mujeres Universitarias (GAMU, Autonomous Group of University Women), which included both Mexican faculty and students, began meeting periodically to discuss how to introduce feminism to campuses across the country. In 1982, a women's studies program was created at the Universidad Autónoma Metropolitana-Xochimilco. Similarly, in 1983, activists in the Mexican feminist movement, including Lourdes Arizpe, Flora Botton, and Elena Urrutia, founded the Programa Interdisciplinario de Estudios de la Mujer (PIEG, Interdisciplinary Women's Studies Program) at El Colegio de México in Mexico City. In 1984, academics formed the Centro de Estudios de la Mujer (Center for Women's Studies) in the psychology faculty at the National Autonomous University of Mexico. The field was formalized with the creation of the Programa Universitario de Estudios de Género (PUEG, University Program on Gender Studies) in 1992, at the urging of academics like Gloria Careaga, Teresita de Barbieri, Graciela Hierro, Araceli Mingo, Lorenia Parada, and Alicia Elena Pérez Duarte.

Activists and researchers in Chile began meeting in 1978 with the creation of the Círculo de la Mujer (Women's Circle). In 1984, they founded the Centro de Estudios de la Mujer (CEM, Center for Women's Studies) in Santiago to facilitate multi-disciplinary studies on women and gender. That same year, Virginia Vargas began teaching women's studies in Peru, and the following year, she along with Virginia Guzmán Barcos and others, founded the Flora Tristán Peruvian Women's Center. The center provided a research facility for women scholars and provided publishing for their works. From the early 1980s, women like Juanita Barreto Gama, Guiomar Dueñas Vargas, Florence Thomas, Magdalena León Gómez, María Martínez, Donny Meertens, Yolanda Puyana Villamizar, María Himelda Ramírez and Ana Rico de Alonso worked to create an interdisciplinary field of feminist study in Colombia. First they met informally, then were able to gain official recognition in 1985 as the Grupo de Estudios Mujer y Sociedad (Women & Society Study Group) and finally in 1994, they launched the Programa de Estudios de Género, Mujer y Desarrollo (PGMD, Gender, Women and Development Studies Program) in the Human Sciences Department at the National University of Colombia.

In 1985, activists in Argentina launched the "Introduction to Women's Studies" and a postgraduate seminar, "La construcción social del género sexual" (The Social Construction of Sexual Gender) at the University of Buenos Aires. In 1987, María Fernández became the chair of UBA's degree program in women's studies. In 1992, the Area Interdisciplinaria de Estudios de la Mujer (AIEM, Interdisciplinary Area of Women's Studies), which became the Instituto Interdisciplinario de Estudios de Género (Interdisciplinary Institute of Gender Studies) in 1997, was founded at UBA linking academics from the faculties of Arts, Anthropology, Classics and Letters, Education, History, Languages, and Philosophy to encourage broader research and analysis of women in these fields. Hilda Habichayn founded the Centro de Estudios Históricos sobre las Mujeres (Center for Historical Studies on Women), which began in 1993 to offer the first master's degree in women's studies in Latin America.

The first women's study program in Paraguay was the Centro Paraguayo de estudios de la Mujer (Paraguayan Center of Women's Studies) at the Universidad Católica "Nuestra Señora de la Asunción". It was founded in 1983 by Olga Caballero, Manuelita Escobar, Marilyn Godoy and Edy Irigoitia. The Grupo de Estudios de la Mujer Paraguaya (GEMPA, Paraguayan Women's Studies Group) was founded at the Paraguayan Center for Sociological Studies in 1985 by Graziella Corvalán and Mirtha Rivarola. Gender studies also began to be established at universities in Brazil in the 1980s and continued to expand throughout the 1990s. In 1992, Brazilian academics at the Federal University of Rio de Janeiro launched Revista Estudos Feministas, one of the primary academic journals on gender in Brazil. Among the contributors for the inaugural issue were Ana Arruda Callado, Heloísa Buarque de Hollanda, Maria Carneiro da Cunha, Mary Garcia Castro, Rosiska Darcy de Oliveira, Valéria Lamego, Miriam Moreira Leite, Leila Linhares, Heleieth Saffioti, Bila Sorj, and others.

The political aims of the feminist movement that compelled the formation of women's studies found themselves at odds with the institutionalized academic feminism of the 1990s. As "woman" as a concept continued to be expanded, the exploration of social constructions of gender led to the field's expansion into both gender studies and sexuality studies. The field of women's studies continued to grow during the 1990s and into the 2000s with the expansion of universities offering majors, minors, and certificates in women's studies, gender studies, and feminist studies. The first official PhD program in Women's Studies was established at Emory University in 1990. As of 2012, there were 16 institutions offering a PhD in Women's Studies in the United States. Since then, UC Santa Cruz (2013), the University of Kentucky-Lexington (2013), Stony Brook University (2014), and Oregon State University (2016) also introduced a PhD in the field.

=== Australia ===
In 1956, Australian feminist Madge Dawson took up a lectureship in the Department of Adult Education at Sydney University and began researching and teaching on the status of women. Dawson's course, "Women in a Changing World", which focused on the socio-economic and political status of women in Western Europe, became one of the first women's studies courses.

=== Asia ===
==== Central Asia ====
In 2015, at Kabul University, the first master's degree course in gender and women's studies in Afghanistan began.

=== Europe ===
Elizabeth Bird traced the development of Women's Studies in the UK out of informal education run by the women's liberation movement (WLM), the Workers' Educational Association, "CR" or "consciousness raising" groups, left-wing activist groups, and extramural departments attached to universities and colleges. Bird notes that, according to feminist activists and scholars Anna Coote and Beatrix Campbell who interviewed many participants in the 1960s-70s development of women's studies, "in the summer of 1969 Juliet Mitchell taught a short course entitled 'The Role of Women in Society' in the 'Anti University', which had been organised by radical academics as part of the student protest movement". Maggie Humm identifies this summer course as "Britain's first women's studies course".

In 1975, Margherita Rendel, Oonagh Hartnett, and Zoe Fairbairns wrote a guide outlining the 17 then-existing undergraduate courses, 1 postgraduate option, four colleges of education's offers, and six polytechnics' courses in Women's Studies – often called 'women in society' – in the United Kingdom. They compiled the guide from surveys of UK universities and adding to research previously published by Sue Beardon and Erika Stevenson for the National Union of Students in 1974.

A part-time postgraduate Diploma in Women's Studies was offered by The Polytechnic of Central London from 1977; in 1978, an MA course on the subject of 'Rights', including women's rights, was organised by Margherita Rendel at the London Institute of Education.

In 1980, the University of Kent launched the first named MA degree in Women's Studies, with Mary Evans leading the course's development. Following Kent, Bradford (1982), Sheffield City Polytechnic (1983), Warwick (1983), and York (1984) opened MA courses. In 1990, part-time BAs in Women's Studies launched at the Polytechnic of North East London and at Preston Polytechnic. Veronica Beechey was recruited by the Open University in 1983 to initiate a women's studies course there.

Current courses in Women's Studies in the United Kingdom can be found through the Universities and Colleges Admissions Service.

== Theoretical traditions and research methods ==
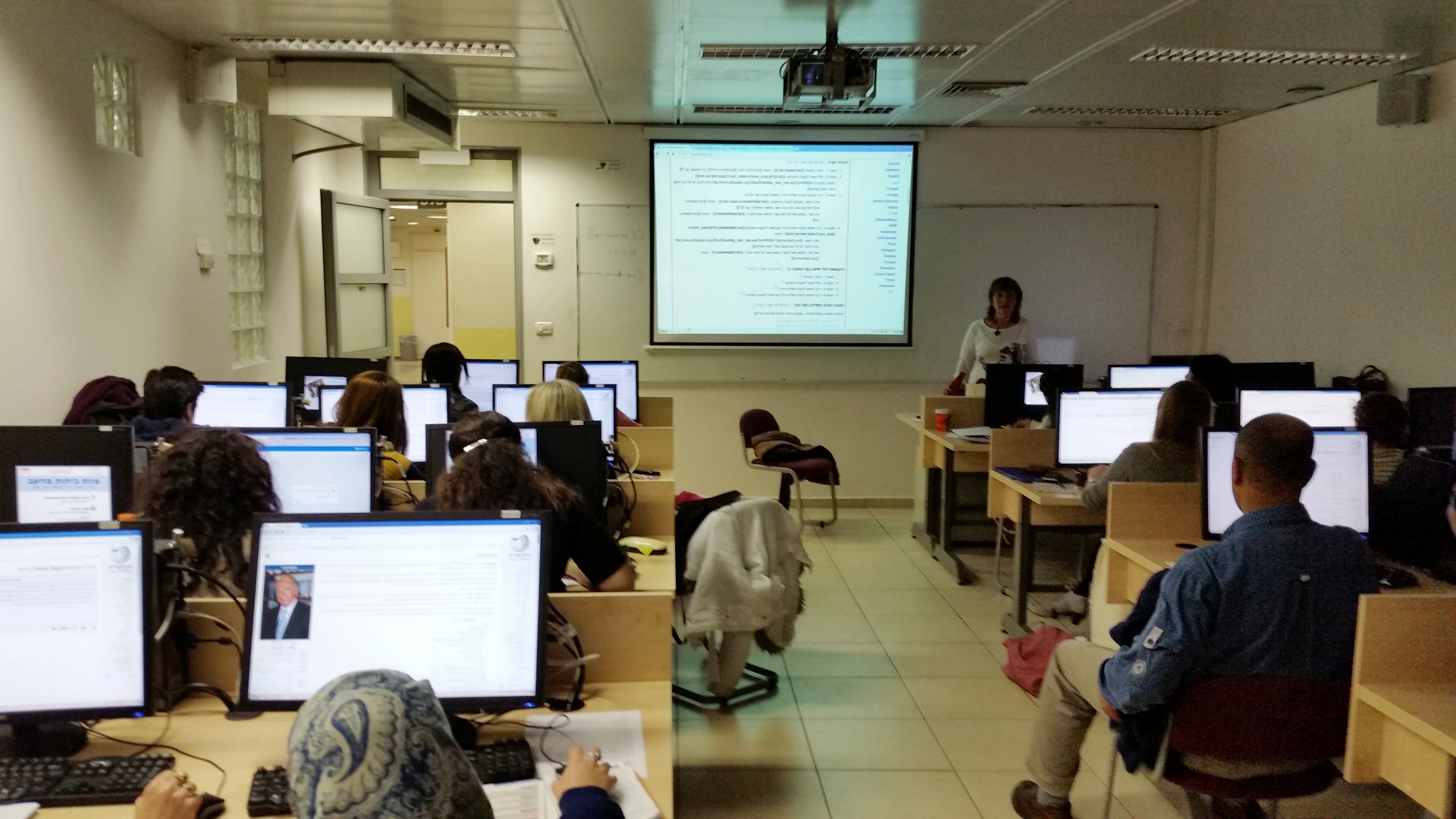
Students of Women and Gender Studies University of Haifa.

Early women's studies courses and curricula were often driven by the question "Why are women not included? Where are the women?". That is, as more women became more present in higher education as both students and faculty, questions arose about the male-centric nature of most courses and curricula. Women faculty in traditional departments such as history, English, and philosophy began offering courses focused on women. Drawing from the women's movement's notion that "the personal is political", courses also began to develop around sexual politics, women's roles in society, and how women's personal lives reflect larger power structures.

Since the 1970s, scholars in women's studies have taken post-modern approaches to understand gender and its intersections with race, class, ethnicity, sexuality, religion, age, and (dis)ability, and how these shape and maintain power structures within society. With this turn, there has been a focus on language, subjectivity, and social hegemony, and how the lives of subjects, however they identify, are constituted. At the core of these theories is the notion that, however one identifies, gender, sex, and sexuality are not intrinsic but are socially constructed.

Major theories employed in women's studies courses include feminist theory, intersectionality, standpoint theory, transnational feminism, and social justice. Research practices associated with women's studies place women and their experiences at the center of inquiry through quantitative, qualitative, and mixed methods. Feminist researchers acknowledge their role in the production of knowledge and make explicit the relationship between the researcher and the research subject.

=== Feminist theory ===
Feminist theory refers to the body of writing that works to address gender discrimination and disparities, while acknowledging, describing, and analyzing the experiences and conditions of women's lives. Theorists and writers such as bell hooks, Simone de Beauvoir, Patricia Hill Collins, and Alice Walker added to the field of feminist theory with respect to how race and gender mutually inform the experiences of women of color with works such as Feminist Theory: From Margin to Center (hooks), In Search of Our Mothers' Gardens (Walker), and Black Feminist Thought: Knowledge, Consciousness, and the Politics of Empowerment (Collins). Bracha Lichtenberg Ettinger introduced the field of matrixial gaze, matrixial (matricial) space and time, with a set of new concepts and vocabulary to introduce the feminine unconscious from psychoanalytic and philosophical perspectives. Alice Walker coined the term womanism to situate black women's experiences as they struggle for social change and liberation, while simultaneously celebrating the strength of black women, their culture, and their beauty. Patricia Hill Collin's contributed the concept of the "matrix of domination" to feminist theory, which reconceptualized race, class, and gender as interlocking systems of oppression that shape experiences of privilege and oppression.

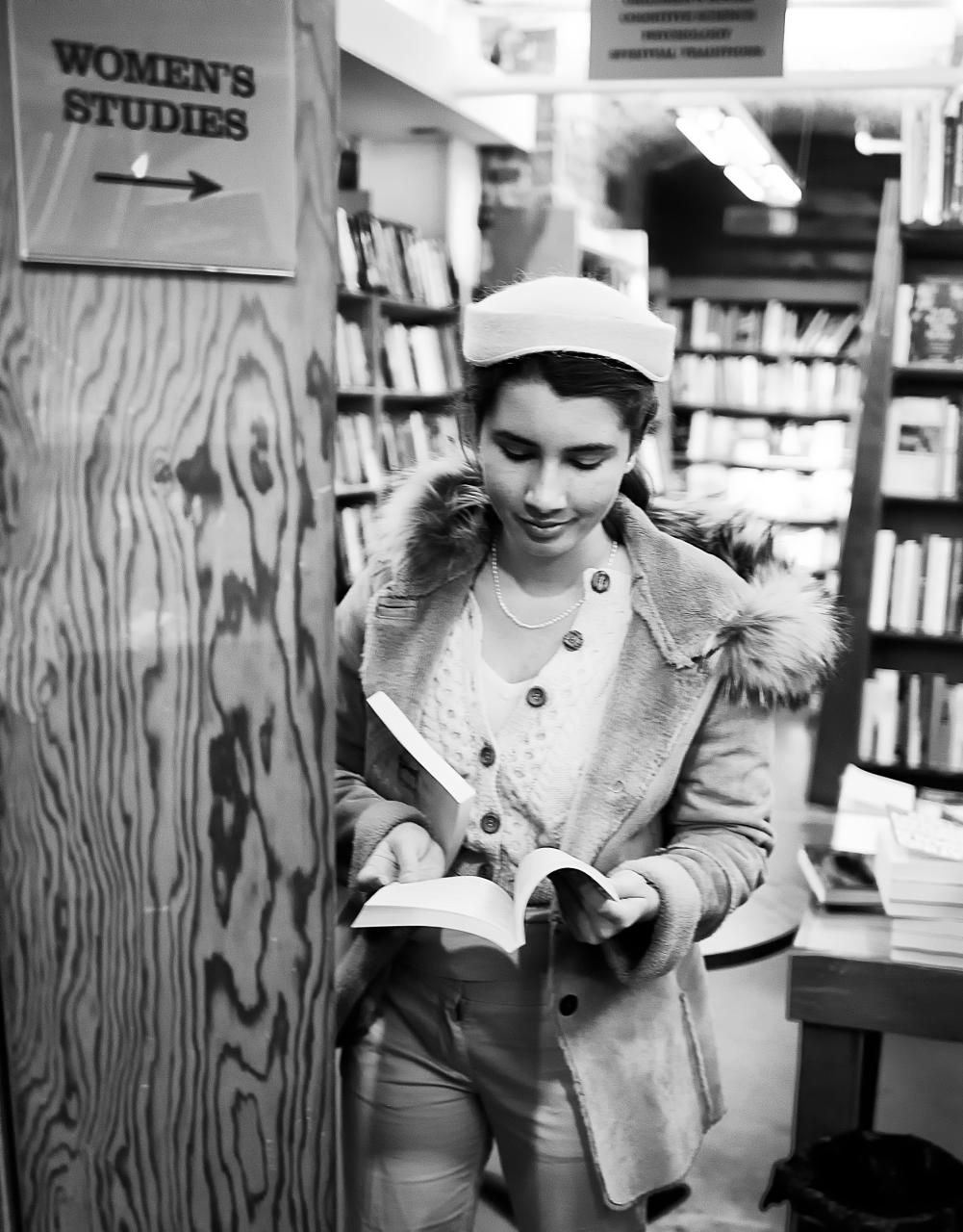
Woman in Women's Studies area of the library

=== Intersectionality ===
Intersectionality is a way of understanding and analyzing the complexity in people, human experiences, and society. Associated with the third wave of feminism, Kimberlé Crenshaw's theory of intersectionality has become the key theoretical framework through which various feminist scholars discuss the relationship of between one's social and political identities such as gender, race, age, and sexual orientation, and received societal discrimination. Intersectionality posits that these relationships must be considered to understand hierarchies of power and privilege, as well as the effects in which they manifest in an individual's life. Though events and conditions of social and political life are often thought to be shaped by one factor, intersectionality theorizes that oppression and social inequality are a result of how powerful individuals view the combination of various factors; emphasizing that discrimination is accounted for by power, not personal identity.

=== Standpoint theory ===
Standpoint theory, also classified as feminist standpoint theory, developed in the 1980s as a way of critically examining the production of knowledge and its effects on practices of power. Standpoint theory operates from the idea that knowledge is socially situated and underrepresented groups and minorities have historically been ignored or marginalized when it comes to the production of knowledge. Emerging from Marxist thought, standpoint theory argues for analysis that challenges the authority of political and social "truths". Standpoint theory, assumes that power lies solely within the hands of the male gender as the process of decision making in society is constructed exclusively for, and by men. An example of where standpoint theory presents itself in society is through the processes of political analysis, as this field of study is almost entirely controlled by men. Furthermore, from a Marxist viewpoint, Karl Marx had expressed a notion in which believed that those in power cannot understand the perspectives of those whom they hold power. Providing that standpoint theory acknowledges the male incapability of understanding the oppression that women face in society.

=== Transnational feminist theory ===
Transnational feminism is concerned with the flow of social, political, and economic equality of women and men across borders; directly in response to globalization, neoliberalism, and imperialism. Women's studies began incorporating transnational feminist theory into its curricula as a way to disrupt and challenge the ways in which knowledge regarding gender is prioritized, transmitted, and circulated in the field and academy. Transnational feminist theory is continually challenging the traditional divides of society, in which are crucial to ongoing politics and cultural beliefs. A key recognition advanced from the transnational feminist perspective is that gender is, has been, and will continue to be, a global effort. Furthermore, a transnational feminist perspective perpetuates that a lack of attention to the cultural and economic injustices of gender, as a result of globalization, may aid in the reinforcing of global gender inequalities; though, this can only come about when one occupies globally privileged subject positions.

=== Social justice ===
Since its inception and connection with the women's movement, activism has been a foundation of women's studies. Increasingly, social justice has become a key component of women's studies courses, programs, and departments. Social justice theory is concerned with the fight for just communities, not at the individual level but across society as a whole. Women's studies students engage in social justice projects, although some scholars and critics are concerned about requiring students to engage in both mandated activism and/or social justice work. Women's studies not only focus on concepts such as domestic violence, discrimination in the workplace, and gender differences in the division of labor at home, but gives a foundation for understanding the root cause of these concepts, which is the first step to making for a better life for women.

=== Agency ===
Agency may be defined as the capability to make choices individually and freely. An individual's agency may be restricted due to various social factors, such as gender, race, religion, and social class. From a feminist standpoint, agency may be viewed as an attempt to equalize the one-sided oppression that has characterized first-wave feminism. Feminists use agency in an attempt to create new forms of autonomy and independence from the reshaping of gender relations that is taking place in global society. Women's studies acknowledges the lack of agency that women historically possessed, due to hierarchical positions in society. Feminists are actively making an effort to increase gender equality, as it may result in expanding social agency for all women.

=== Materialism ===
Materialist theory derives from the 1960s and 1970s feminist social work. Materialism possesses significant ties to the Marxist theories of history, agency, and ideology; though, it may be distinguished through the incorporation of language and culture to its philosophy. Materialism poses questions to both social analytics and social relations, in which may be found in the material conditions of any given society. In addition, from an examination from a gender standpoint, material conditions are studied in relation to realistic aspects of women's lives. A key aspect in which materialist feminists have revealed these relations is from the feminist perspective, claiming that social conditions of gender are historically situated, as well as subjected to intervention and change. Materialist feminism specifically focuses on social arrangements that accentuate the role of women, notably the aspects of family, domesticity, and motherhood. Materialism analyzes gendering discourses that promote women's marginalization; Thus, one of the most influential aspects of materialist feminism is its attentiveness to questions of ideology and how they relate to history and agency.

=== Pedagogies ===
In most institutions, women's studies courses employ feminist pedagogy in a triad model of equal parts research, theory, and praxis. The decentralization of the professor as the source of knowledge is often fundamental to the culture of women's studies classrooms. Students are encouraged to take an active role in "claiming" their education, taking responsibility for themselves and the learning process. Women's studies programs and courses are designed to explore the intersectionality of gender, race, sexuality, class, and other topics that are involved in identity politics and societal norms through a feminist lens. Women's studies courses focus on a variety of topics, including media literacy, sexuality, race and ethnicity, women's history, queer theory, multiculturalism, and other closely related areas. Faculty incorporate these components into classes across a variety of topics, including popular culture, women in the economy, reproductive and environmental justice, and women's health across the lifespan. Bracha L. Ettinger's matrixial theory is influential in the fields of art pedagogy in relation to ethics of care.

Women's studies programs are involved in social justice work and often design curricula that are embedded in theory and activism outside the classroom. Some women's studies programs offer community-based internships, allowing students to experience how institutional structures of privilege and oppression directly affect women's lives. Women's studies curricula often encourage students to participate in service-learning activities in addition to discussing and reflecting on course materials. However, Daphne Patai, from the University of Massachusetts Amherst, has criticized this aspect of women's studies programs, arguing that they place politics over education, stating "the strategies of faculty members in these programs have included policing insensitive language, championing research methods deemed congenial to women (such as qualitative over quantitative methods), and conducting classes as if they were therapy sessions." Since women's studies students analyze identity markers including gender, race, class, and sexuality, this often results in dissecting institutionalized structures of power. As a result of these pedagogies, women's studies students leave university with a toolkit to effect social change and address power inequalities in society.

Notable women's studies scholars include Charlotte Bunch, Patricia Hill Collins, bell hooks, Angela Davis, Cherríe Moraga, Audre Lorde, Adrienne Rich, and Barbara Ransby.

== Internal academic criticism ==
In the book Professing Feminism: Education and Indoctrination in Women's Studies, 30 women's studies academics came together to criticise the "unhealthy conditions and self-destructive tendencies that appear to be intrinsic to many Women's Studies programs". Professors spoke of being unable to "discuss their concerns about this belligerent anti-intellectualism with other faculty members in Women's Studies", with claims of a "constant emphasis on political purity.... from both students and professors".

== See also ==
- Feminist economics
- Feminist Formations
- Feminist Review
- Feminist Studies
- Feminist theory
- French feminism
- Gender studies
- Girl studies
- List of women's and gender studies academics
- List of women's studies journals
- Men's studies
- Misandry
- Separatist feminism
- Signs: Journal of Women in Culture and Society
- Social criticism
- Women artists
- Women's history
- World Center for Women's Archives
