= Marysa Navarro =

Spanish-American historian (1934–2025)

Marysa Navarro Aranguren
- Born: 12 October 1934; Pamplona, Spain
- Died: 2 March 2025 (aged 90); Boston, Massachusetts, U.S.
- Citizenship: Spain; United States
- Occupation: Academic
- Awards: Silvert Award

Academic background
- Education: Ph.D.
- Alma mater: Columbia University
- Thesis: 'Los Nacionalistas'

Academic work
- Discipline: History of feminism; History of Latin American women; History of Latin America

Marysa Navarro Aranguren (12 October 1934 – 2 March 2025) was a Spanish-American historian specializing in the history of feminism, the history of Latin American women, and the history of Latin America. She occupied a prominent role as a promoter and activist in the areas of women's studies and women's history. Navarro was an expert on the figure of Eva Perón, having published her biography, and having written articles about her. Navarro lived in the United States, and had dual citizenship, Spanish and U.S.

== Background ==
Marysa Navarro Aranguren was born in Pamplona, Navarre, Basque Country, Spain on 12 October 1934. She had lived most of her life outside of Spain. The Spanish Civil War of 1936 forced her family to go into exile for political reasons as her father, Vicente Navarro, was an education inspector and a militant of the Republican Left. Her family sought refuge in France but given the evidence that Franco's regime was going to last longer than they thought, in 1948, they emigrated to Uruguay.

In 1955, after obtaining a Bachelor's degree from the Liceo Instituto Batlle y Ordóñez in Montevideo, Navarro decided to study History and began her training at the Instituto de Profesores Artigas (Artigas Teachers' Institute). In 1958, she interrupted her studies at this institute and, thanks to a scholarship, went to the United States to study at Columbia University in New York City for a master's degree and a doctorate in History, which she completed in 1960 and 1964, respectively. Her doctoral dissertation dealt with the development of the Argentine rights between the years 1930–1946, which was published in Spanish in 1969 under the name Los Nacionalistas.

Navarro died in Boston, Massachusetts, on 2 March 2025, at the age of 90.

== Career and research ==
Between 1963 and 1967, Navarro worked as a professor at different university institutions, Rutgers University, Yeshiva University, Kean University, and Long Island University. In 1968, she became a professor of Ancient and Contemporary History of Latin America at Dartmouth College, located in Hanover, New Hampshire, at a time when women were not admitted either in classes or in the faculty, being the first woman to hold that position. Marked by the feminist movement, she campaigned for Dartmouth College to be opened to female students, which took place in 1972, when the school hired female teachers. She also fought against segregation.

She worked at Dartmouth College for 42 years, serving as director of the History Department (1982–1985), associate dean of Social Sciences (1985–1989), and director of the Latin American and Caribbean Studies Program (1992–2004). Her great interest, teaching feminism and gender issues, led her to direct the Women's Studies Program (1979–1981). Upon her retirement in 2010, Dartmouth named her Professor Emeritus and she was awarded the Elizabeth Howland Hand-Otis Norton Pierce Award for Outstanding Undergraduate Teaching for teaching excellence.

She was part of numerous associations and editorial committees in feminist-themed journals and was very involved in the Latin American Studies Association (LASA), of which she was vice president (2002) and president (2003–2004). Since the beginning of her studies, Navarro had received numerous research grants. She continued her research through the grant received in 2009, the Amelia Lacroze de Fortabat scholarship from the David Rockefeller Center for Latin American Studies. In 2017, she was named Doctor honoris causa by the Public University of Navarre (UPNA), the first woman to achieve this honorary title by this academic institution.

=== Gender studies and feminism in Latin America ===
In 1988, she helped start the Restoring Women to History project, led by the Organization of American Historians. Together with Virginia Sánchez Korrol, she examined the role of women in the history of Latin America through articles collected and published in book form. She also directed with Catharine R. Stimpson the publication A New Knowledge: Women's Studies, a four-volume collection that brings together Spanish translations of European and American articles that defined research on gender issues: What are women's studies?; Sexuality, genders and sexual roles; Social, economic and cultural changes; and New directions. From 1976 to 1996, she was on the editorial board of the feminist college journal, Signs: Journal of Women in Culture and Society, published by the University of Chicago. Influenced by the feminist movement of the 1960s and 1970s, and together with personalities such as June Nash (2004) and Helen Safa (2007), Navarro became interested in the situation of women in history, forming part of the creative generation of the recent training field of Latin American women's studies. She has taught as a professor, visiting professor, or guest at universities in the United States, Spain, Mexico, Uruguay, and England, and had actively campaigned to popularize gender studies through articles, meetings, and conferences at universities in different countries. As a researcher, she had studied Latin American feminist encounters, analyzing both their most conflictive aspects (confrontations, theoretical differences, etc.) and their positive ones (network formation, capacity for joint mobilization, etc.). In "Some reflections on the VII Latin American and Caribbean Feminist Meeting" she expresses her thoughts on the matter.

=== Study of Eva Perón ===
Navarro was an expert in the figure of Eva Perón. In 1982, Navarro published her biography, Evita, to publicize the dimensions of this woman who became a part of the power and a symbol of Peronism, and whose image presented two opposite faces according to the ideological lens with which one looked at her. For the followers of Perón, Eva was an extraordinary person, a tireless worker, while for the anti-Peronists, she was an ignorant and ambitious woman. In addition to the biography, which had been published on several occasions, Navarro had continued to write articles on Eva, the last one in 2010, focused on the mythology of "Evita".

== Awards and honours ==
- 1982: Distinguished Woman Scholar (University of New Hampshire)
- 2007: Distinguished Visitor (Buenos Aires)
- 2010: Elizabeth Howland Hand-Otis Norton Pierce Award for Outstanding Undergraduate Teaching (Dartmouth College)
- 2017: Doctor honoris causa (UPNA)
- 2017: Silvert Award
- 2019: Illustrious visitor of the city of Montevideo

== Selected works ==
=== Books ===
- Los nacionalistas. Buenos Aires: Jorge Álvarez, 1969. (in Spanish)
- Eva Perón, with Nicholas Fraser. London: Andre Deutsch, 1981; New York: Norton, 1981, 1996.
- Un nuevo saber: Los estudios de mujeres, ed. with Catharine R. Stimpson. Vol. 1, ¿Qué son los estudios de mujeres? Buenos Aires: Fondo de Cultura Económica, 1998. (in Spanish)
- Un nuevo saber: Los estudios de mujeres, ed. with Catharine R. Stimpson. Vol. 2, Sexualidad, género y roles sexuales. Buenos Aires: Fondo de Cultura Económica, 1999. (in Spanish)
- Women in Latin America and the Caribbean: Restoring Women to History, with Virginia Sánchez Korrol. Bloomington: Indiana University Press, 1999. Trad: Mujeres en América Latina y el Caribe. Madrid: Narcea, 2004.
- Un nuevo saber: Los estudios de mujeres, with Catharine R. Stimpson. Vol. 3, Cambios sociales, económicos y culturales. Buenos Aires: Fondo de Cultura Económica, 2000. (in Spanish)
- Evita: Mitos y representaciones, comp. Buenos Aires: Fondo de Cultura Económica, 2002. (in Spanish)
- Un nuevo saber: Los estudios de mujeres, ed. with Catharine R. Stimpson. Vol. 4, Nuevas direcciones. Buenos Aires: Fondo de Cultura Económica, 2002. (in Spanish)
- Evita. Buenos Aires: Corregidor, 1982; Planeta, 1997, 1998; Edhasa, 2005.

=== Articles ===
- "The Case of Eva Perón", Signs 3, 1 (1977).
- "Research on Latin American Women", Signs 5, 1 (1979).
- "Evita and the Crisis of 17 October 1945: A Case Study of Peronist and Anti-Peronist Mythology", Journal of Latin American Studies 12, 1 (1980).
- "Evita’s Charismatic Leadership", de Michael L. Conniff, ed., Latin American Populism in Comparative Perspective. Albuquerque: University of New Mexico Press, 1982.
- "Hidden, Silent, and Anonymous: Women Workers in the Argentine Trade Union Movement", with Norbert C. Soldon, ed., The World of Women’s Trade Unionism. Westport: Greenwood Press, 1985.
- "The Personal Is Political: Las Madres de Plaza de Mayo", with Susan Eckstein, ed., Power and Popular Protest: Latin American Social Movements. Berkeley: University of California Press, 1989, 2001.
- "The Construction of a Latin American Feminist Identity", with Alfred Stepan, ed., Americas: New Interpretive Essays. New York: Oxford University Press, 1992.
- "Feminisms in Latin America: From Bogotá to San Bernardo", with Nancy Saporta Sternbach, Patricia Chuchryk, Sonia Alvarez, Signs 17, 2 (1992). Reprinted in Magdalena León, ed., Mujeres y participación política: Avances y en América Latina, Bogotá: TM Editores, 1994; Barbara Laslett, Johanna Brenner, and Yesim Arat, eds., Rethinking the Political: Gender, Resistance, and the State, Chicago: University of Chicago Press, 1995.
- "Algunas reflexiones sobre el VII Encuentro Feminista Latinoamericano y del Caribe", with Cecilia Olea Mauleón, ed., Encuentros, (des)encuentros y búsquedas: El movimiento feminista en América Latina. Lima: Flora Tristan, 1998. (in Spanish)
- "Against Marianismo", with Rosario Montoya, Lessie Jo Frazier, and Janise Hurtig, eds., Gender’s Place: Feminist Anthropologies of Latin America. New York: Palgrave, 2002.
- "Encountering Latin American and Caribbean Feminisms", with seven co-authors, Signs, 28, 2 (2003). Reimpreso en Revista Estudos Feministas 11, 2 (2003).
- "Evita, historia y mitología", Caravelle. Cahiers du monde hispanique et luso-brésilien, N. 98, "Icônes d’Amérique latine", June 2012. (in Spanish)
