= Azza Ghanmi =

Tunisian academic and feminist

Azza Ghanmi is a Tunisian feminist and activist engaged in the advancement of women's rights in Tunisia.

In 1978, Ghanmi was a co-founder of Club d'Etude de la Condition de la Femme at the Club Tahar Haddad. Then, in 1985, she became a founding member of Nissa a small association of women, from diverse backgrounds, who published a feminist magazine of the same name, between 1985 and 1987. In her advocacy, Ghanmi aligns with the l’Association des Femmes Africaines pour la Recherche et le Développement (AFARD) / Association of African Women for Research and Development (AAWORD). She also promotes Tunisia's compliance with the International Convention for the Elimination of Discrimination Against Women (CEDAW), to which Tunisia became a signatory in 1985. In 1993, Ghanmi published Le Mouvement Féministe Tunisien, a chronological record and commentary on events of the Tunisian feminist movement of the 1980s.

== Personal life ==
Ghanmi was born in Tunis. There, she pursued a degree in medicine before transitioning to a career in education and now, emergency medical skills in secondary schools.

Ghanmi married Gilbert Naccache (1939 - 2020), a Jewish, left-wing, Tunisian activist and former political prisoner.

== Feminist activism ==
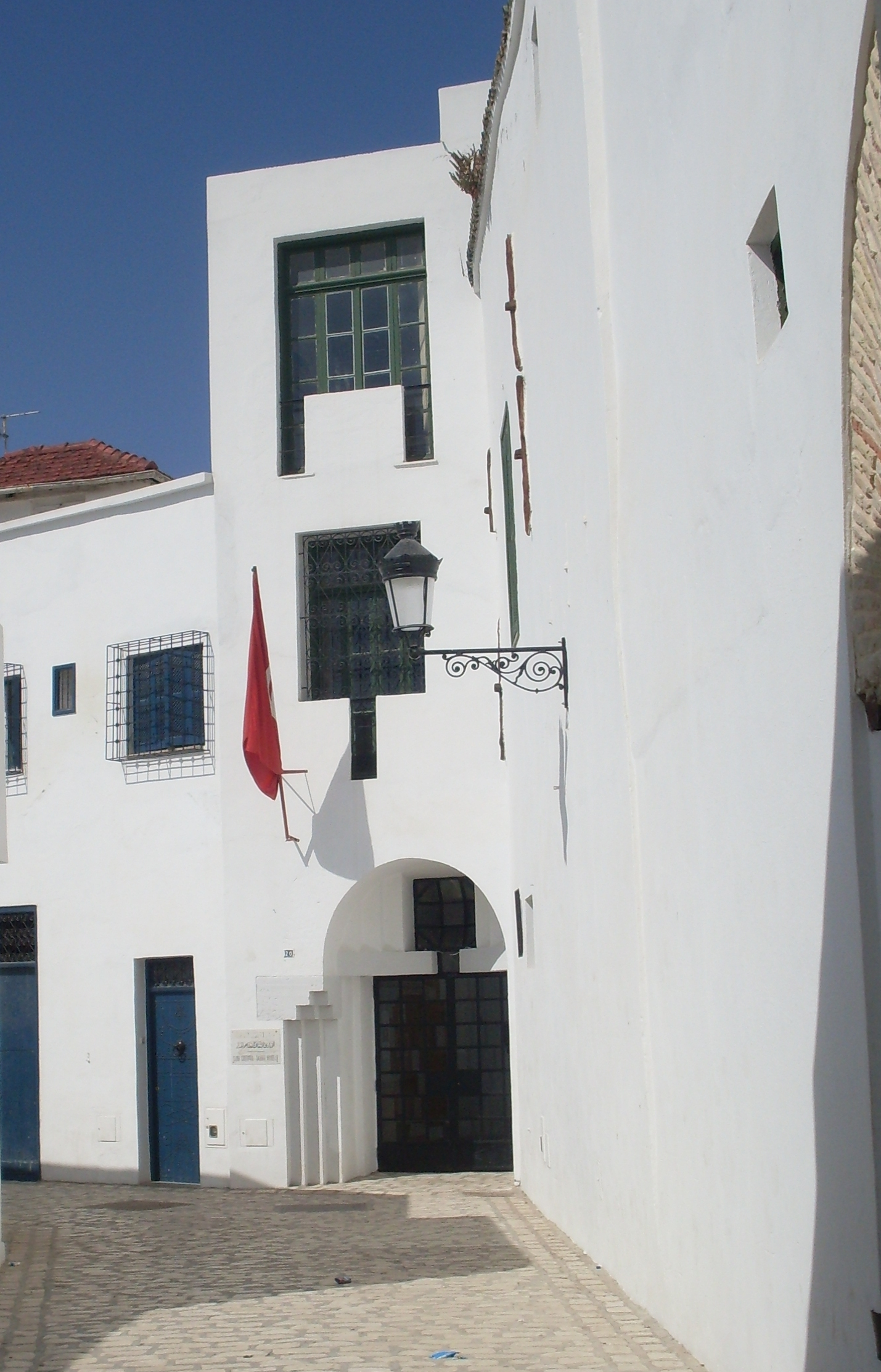
Tahar Haddad Club, the meeting place of the Club d'Etudes de la Condition de la Femme.

In 1978, in collaboration with Ilhem Marzouki and others, Ghanmi was a co-founder of Club d'Etude de la Condition de la Femme (Club for the Study of the Condition of Women) at the Tahar al-Haddad Cultural Center in Tunis. Using feminist and anti-imperialist principles common to the autonomous Tunisian feminist movement, the club promoted substantive discussion about the status of women and girls. The club sought solidarity with other causes, such as Palestinian and Maghrebi women's advocacy. Within the club, Ghanmi participated in a focus group on the topic of "Women and the Family," including discussion of how diverse sexualities impact women's experiences of oppression.

In the wake of events of mass unrest in the early 1980s such as the Sabra and Shatila Massacre and Israel's invasion of Lebanon, Ghanmi became involved with an early iteration of the Tunisian Association of Democratic Women, a human rights foundation dedicated to protecting the civil rights of Tunisian women through democratic measures.

In January 1989, Ghanmi and fellow Tunisian feminist scholar, Dorra Mahfoudh, co-founded the Association of Tunisian Women for Research and Development (AFTURD). Its mission was to promote research of women's status and integration in Tunisian society in cultural, social, economic, and political realms. In August of the same year, they co-founded the Tunisian Association of Democratic Women (ATFD). This organisation focussed on the effects of Tunisia's religious and political system on women's rights and comparison of these rights to international standards. Ghanmi served as secretary general of ATFD. Through a liberal lens, these two groups observed areas such as gender roles within the family; gender equality in education; image of women in the media; the status and role of rural women.

Ghanmi supports the work of the Association of African Women for Research and Development (AFARD), established in December 1977 to assemble African feminists and intellectuals to improve women's status and rights throughout the continent. She also promotes alliance with and eventual incorporation of the organs of the autonomous Tunisian feminist movement into the National Union of Tunisian Women (UNFT). This organisation was founded in 1956 to promote women's rights in Tunisia through methods including family planning education and also radical reform. In 1985, Ghanmi and fellow Tunisian feminists, including Emma bel-Hajj as director, founded a small association called Nissa. Between 1985 and 1987, the group published eight issues of a journal of the same name.

Internal disputes arose within Nissa. Director, Emma bel-Hajj hesitated to release specific standards on how Nissa would address the Code of Personal Status in Tunisia in the journal. Bel-Hajj decided that Nissa would address the question on a case by case basis. There was also internal debate as to whether or not men would be allowed to contribute to the journal. This was resolved in the affirmative. Dissatisfied with the group's decisions on such issues, Azza Ghanmi, Zeineb Guehiss, Nadia Hakimi, and Neila Jrad published an article in Nissa criticizing the journal for distancing itself from its primary objectives. The four feminists announced their withdrawal from the group in November 1985.
