= Donny Meertens =

- Born: Donalda Jeanine Meertens The third 1946 (age 79–80); Rotterdam, Netherlands
- Occupations: Academic, policy and development advisor
- Years active: 1979–present

Donalda Jeanine "Donny" Meertens (born 1946) is a Dutch academic, Colombian policy and development advisor, and a co-founder of the Programa de Estudios de Género, Mujer y Desarrollo (Gender, Women and Development Studies Program) at the National University of Colombia. Educated in the Netherlands, Meertens studied land rights in Colombia becoming interested in how the exploitation of rural peasants increased violence in the country. She moved to Colombia to assist with development programs in the early 1990s and has held a number of posts with United Nations agencies. She also served as the research coordinator for the Comisión Nacional de Reparación y Reconciliación (National Commission for Reparation and Reconciliation). She has worked as a professor at the National University of Colombia and the Pontificia Universidad Javeriana. Her work has centered on rural displacement, gender inequalities, and the links between violence and the land.

== Early life and education ==
Donalda Jeanine Meertens was born in 1946 in Rotterdam, Netherlands, to Adriana Alberdina (née Philippus) and Jan Meertens. Meertens graduated with a master's degree in social anthropology from the University of Amsterdam. She went on to secure a PhD from the Katholieke Universiteit Nijmegen. Her thesis Tierra, violencia y género: hombres y mujeres en la historia rural de Colombia 1930–1990 (Land, Violence and Gender: Men and Women in the Rural History of Colombia 1930–1990) prepared under the advisors Gerrit J. Huizer and Gerrit A. de Bruijne, was published in 1997. The work evaluated how violence began to surge during the 1930s because of the exploitation of tenant farmers who owed labor services in a type of feudalistic peasant system to landowners. Examining policies through the 1960s, the work noted that violence continued to escalate because of the resistance of land owners and a combination of rural banditry and repressive government policies which used violence to suppress unrest. In the third period, Meertens analysis showed that the introduction of reforms and a press toward capitalism from the 1970s, led to a rise in drug trafficking and the development of paramilitary organizations to provide defense to those engaged in the drug trade.

== Career ==
Working at the Center for Study and Documentation of Latin America at the University of Amsterdam, Meertens publishing about land rights and reform in Colombia in 1979. Her study analyzed whether the land reforms and creation of the Asociación Nacional de Usuarios Campesinos (ANUC, National Peasant Association) were effective in improving the living conditions of the poorest rural workers in Colombia. From 1967, when the ANUC was created, the government's goal was to eliminate social unrest caused by the unequal distribution of land, lax regulations governing land ownership and rural poverty. She concluded that the partial reforms did not meet the aims intended. Throughout the 1980s, Meertens continued to evaluate violence in Colombia, including studies of the impact of drug trafficking on the social and economic structures of the country. Her influential study with Gonzalo Sánchez, Bandoleros, gamonales y campesinos: el caso de 'la violencia' en Colombia (Bandits, Peasants, and Politics: The Case of 'La Violencia' in Colombia, 1982), examined the rise of rural bandits who were able to usurp the authority of national politicians, become leaders and spokespersons for grievances of the rural population, and control the local economy. By the late 1980s, she began to include gender in her works, analyzing the ways that working and living conditions impact women and spaces.

In the early 1990s, Meertens began working with various agencies on development projects in Colombia. Simultaneously, she worked as an independent researcher and a lecturer at the National University of Colombia. In 1994, she became one of the founders of the women's studies program, Programa de Estudios de Género, Mujer y Desarrollo (PGMD, Gender, Women and Development Studies Program) at the university, along with Juanita Barreto Gama, Guiomar Dueñas Vargas, Florence Thomas, Magdalena León Gómez, María Martínez, Yolanda Puyana Villamizar, María Himelda Ramírez and Ana Rico de Alonso, and Florence Thomas. In addition to teaching, she continued with her work in policy and development, serving from 1997 as the Colombian Gender Adviser for the United Nations High Commissioner for Refugees, from 2008 as program officer for the United Nations Development Fund for Women, and from 2009 as a research coordinator for the Comisión Nacional de Reparación y Reconciliación (National Commission for Reparation and Reconciliation). In 2013, she was awarded a fellowship from the Woodrow Wilson International Center for Scholars. That year, she also became am associate professor of political science at the Pontificia Universidad Javeriana, and a researcher at that university's Alfredo Vázquez Carrizosa Institute of Human Rights and Peacebuilding.

Many of Meertens' works focus on the experiences of women who live in areas of conflict. Political scientist, Jenny Pearce, noted that Meertens' work was pioneering in that it not only evaluated how Colombian women lived through and experienced the country's violence, but also because she was one of the first scholars to assess peasant women, a typically under-studied group. Looking at war crimes, Meertens evaluated how displacement from their land impacted married and single mothers, women in informal partnerships, and widows, noting that they often moved multiple times and experienced prolonged periods of a lack of safety. Because of customs which assumed women could not hold land titles and inheritance which favored a birth family over a spouse, reclaiming their land, particularly if their partner had not had a paper title, presented complex obstacles. She went beyond examining experiences and proposed restitution, to evaluating how effective reparations were and whether their implementation transformed systemic biases in later policy proposals. Her ongoing research questions whether land restitution will lead to an increase in socio-economic and political sustainability and stability.

== Selected works ==
- Meertens, Donny (1979). Jonkers en boeren: de strijd om het land in Colombia: drie essays over agrarische ontwikkeling, produktiewijzen en boerenstrijd [Land Owners and Farmers: The Battle for the Land in Colombia: Three Essays on Agricultural Development, Modes of Production and Farming Struggle] (in Dutch). Amsterdam, Netherlands: Centrum voor Studie en Documentatie van Latijns-Amerika. ISBN 978-90-70280-22-2.
- Meertens, Donny (1997). Tierra, violencia y género: hombres y mujeres en la historia rural de Colombia 1930-1990 [Land, Violence and Gender: Men and Women in the Rural History of Colombia 1930–1990] (PDF) (PhD) (in Spanish). Nijmegen, Netherlands: Katholieke Universiteit Nijmegen, Derde Wereld Centrum Ontwikkelingsstudies. ISBN 978-90-72639-69-1. Archived (PDF) from the original on 28 March 2023.
- Sánchez G., Gonzalo; Meertens, Donny (2001). Bandits, Peasants, and Politics: The Case of "La Violencia" in Colombia. Translated by Hynds, Alan (1st English ed.). Austin, Texas: University of Texas Press. ISBN 978-0-292-77758-3.
- Meertens, Donny (April 2010). "Forced Displacement and Women's Security in Colombia". Disasters. 34 (2). Oxford, UK: Wiley-Blackwell: 147–164. doi:10.1111/j.1467-7717.2010.01151.x. ISSN 0361-3666. OCLC 613406049. PMID 20132270.
- Meertens, Donny; Zambrano, Margarita (July 2010). "Citizenship Deferred: The Politics of Victimhood, Land Restitution and Gender Justice in the Colombian (Post?) Conflict". International Journal of Transitional Justice. 4 (2). Oxford, UK: Oxford University Press: 189–206. doi:10.1093/ijtj/ijq009. ISSN 1752-7716. OCLC 681648835.
- Meertens, Donny (2019). Elusive Justice: Women, Land Rights, and Colombia's Transition to Peace. Madison, Wisconsin: University of Wisconsin Press. ISBN 978-0-299-32560-2.
