= African Gender Institute =

Feminist research and teaching group

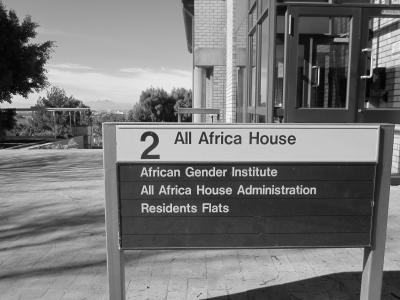
Sign showing the African Gender Institute at the University of Cape Town

The African Gender Institute (AGI) is a feminist research and teaching group that studies issues related to gender in Africa. It has become a department at the University of Cape Town (UCT), administered within the School of African and Gender Studies, Social Anthropology and Linguistics. The AGI has its own staff and has a unique degree of independence from UCT.

== Purpose ==
The AGI describes itself as specifically feminist and seeks to promote feminism on the African continent. It serves as a point of contact for feminist intellectuals across Africa, many of whom suffer from isolation and discrimination at their academic institutions. Amina Mama—a key figure at the AGI—has argued that the organization constitutes a key exception to neoliberal commodification of and control over African academics. A major goal of the AGI is to maintain an institutional space for African feminists to network, collaborate, teach, and research.

== History ==
The AGI grew out of the Equal Opportunities Research Project, created at the University of Cape Town in 1992 as apartheid was ending. The AGI was created in 1996, with the specific goal of advocating for women researchers, policy advocates and writers based within African countries, and with commitment to the growth and voice of African feminisms. From 1998 to 1999 Amanda Gouws was the acting director.

Mama became director of the AGI in 2000 and helped to found its journal Feminist Africa. Under Mama's leadership, projects in women's access to e-technologies, women's peace activism, sexual and reproductive rights, and projects on citizenship were undertaken, with contributors across the continent. Key among these were Elaine Salo, Sisonke Msimang, Jane Bennett, Jennifer Radloff, and Yaliwe Clarke in South Africa, Charmaine Pereira in Nigeria, Sylvia Tamale and Ruth Ochieng in Uganda, Takyiwaa Manuh and Akosua Ampofo in Ghana, and many others. The AGI also grew a strong undergraduate and graduate teaching and research programme within the university of Cape Town.

Faced with budget cuts and shifting institutional support, the AGI found itself split from the project of Gender Studies at UCT. The AGI, under the directorship of Jane Bennett from 2008 to 2017, focused on consolidating its core intellectual positions and its institutional position at UCT, and continued to run successful projects, especially in sexuality and reproductive justice work. These efforts were generally successful, and in 2017, Yaliwe Clarke took over the directorship of the AGI with new agendas for strengthening black, queer and African work especially among young women. This was strongly supported by a new Advisory Board

== Activities ==
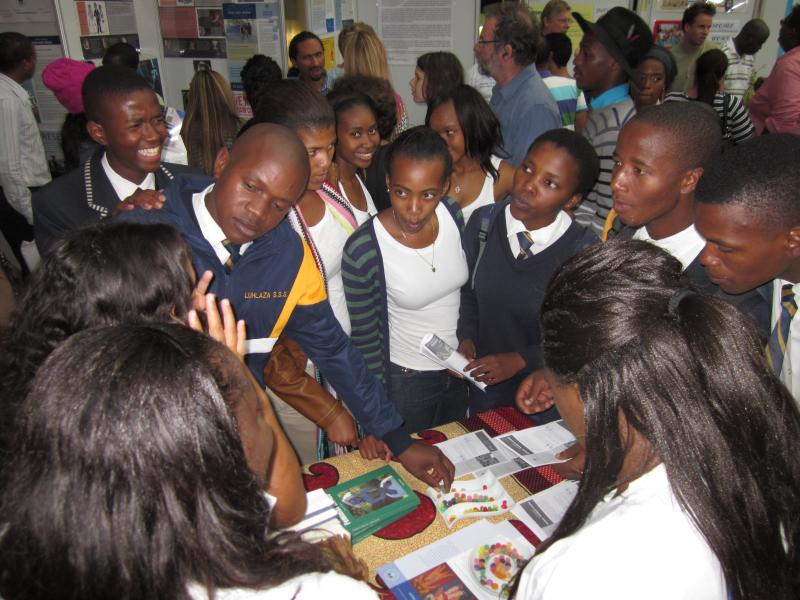
High school students check out the African Gender Institute during a UCT open day.

Gender and Women's Studies for Africa's Transformation, or GWS Africa, is one of AGI's major projects. GWS Africa is an effort aimed at creating and sharing a strong intellectual core for feminists across Africa. Much of GWS Africa takes place online, through a listserv and a website. The organization generated Feminist Africa, which mostly circulates online. Through GWS Africa, the AGI has been a major force for increasing women's access to internet communications.

In 2000–2002, GWS Africa conducted a survey of Gender and/or Women's Studies Departments across Africa. It found that these disciplines were generally on the rise, but that many of them had adopted the mainstream Women in Development (WID) approach. This finding reinforced the AGI's desire to foster a more critical African feminist discourse, and led in 2002 to a significant pan-African feminist forum in 2002, held at UCT.

From 2002 on, the AGI's work on strengthening gender studies and feminist work on the continent grew in multiple directions, including the creation of a Southern Africa-wide network on sexual harassment in higher education, the growth of feminist-oriented e-space specifically designed for the interest of African-based feminists, the regular publication of Feminist Africa, and many capacity-building workshops on questions of land, movement building, militarism and sexuality.

From 2008 on, under the new directorship of Jane Bennett, programmes on sexuality and reproductive justice were strengthened while other AGI threads were simultaneously developed by a very strong team, including Yaliwe Clarke working on women's peace activism with Ruth Ochieng of ISIS-Wicce in Uganda. The teaching programmes within the University of Cape Town grew strongly, and partnerships were built with Barnard College in New York, the Gino Germani Institute in Buenos Aires, and CODESRIA in Senegal. E-advocacy projects were built by Selina Mudavanhu, and others.

In 2012, the University of Cape Town instituted a merger process which split the AGI's public project work from its gender studies teaching, creating a new section of Gender Studies. This had challenging impacts, but the AGI continued to stabilize itself with new programmes in young women's leadership in sexuality.

In 2017, under new directorship again, with Yaliwe Clarke, the AGI ran programmes in queer visuality, with film festivals in different locations, and initiated work on a symposium entitled "Dreaming the Future", to celebrate the work of acclaimed South African feminist Pumla Gqola.

== See also ==
- Feminism in South Africa
