= Achola Pala =

Kenyan academic

- Born: Martha Achola Pala; Bondo, Kenya
- Other names: Achola Pala Okeyo, Achola O. Pala
- Occupation: Sociologist
- Years active: 1977–present

Achola Pala is a Kenyan anthropologist, sociologist, and women's policy specialist. Born in a small town in western Kenya, Pala completed her education at the University of East Africa and Harvard. She worked as a researcher with the University of Nairobi and later was the head of social science research at the International Centre of Insect Physiology and Ecology. Concerned about women's empowerment and the impact of public policies on women, she worked with numerous divisions of the United Nations including UNESCO, UNICEF, the United Nations University, and the World Food Council, before becoming chief of the Africa Section of UNIFEM. She also participated in numerous conferences on women including the 1980, 1985, and 1995 World Conferences on Women. She worked with Esther Jonathan Wandeka to gain governmental support for the 1985 conference held in Nairobi and was instrumental in introducing the peace torch at the 1995 Beijing conference.

Pala was one of the feminist scholars who founded the Association of African Women for Research and Development (AAWORD) in 1977 to promote women's studies and research on African women by African women. She was also a founding member of Development Alternatives with Women for a New Era (DAWN), created in 1984 to promote cooperation among women academics throughout the Global South. A pioneering intellectual woman of Kenya, she is recognized for encouraging African scholarship. Her research has evaluated the negative impacts public policies have had on women and stressed the importance of allowing women to design policy solutions based their own priorities and cultural traditions. During her tenure as chief of the Africa Section of UNIFEM, she was able to implement a policy which required that in the Kenyan office of the organization, all programs were headed by African women.

== Early life and education ==
Achola Pala was born in Kisumu County Kenya, to Agnes (née Bolo) and Hosea Pala. Her parents had both attended the Jeanes School in the Kabete, neighborhood of Nairobi. Her father was a teacher and her mother worked in development programs. Both were feminists and interested in creating schools and providing technical training skills to improve their community. Her parents encouraged all of their children, including girls, to acquire an education. One of nine siblings, Pala's oldest brother was Francis Otieno Pala, a co-founder of the National Library Service of Kenya. She began her education at the local Diemo School, but after two years studied in Butere, where her eldest sister, Patricia Anyango, Oloo was a teacher. Patricia homeschooled her for two years after which she returned to Diemo to complete her primary school education The family lives in Seme Constituency of Kisumu County, Kenya. In the 1960s, she graduated from Butere Girls High School|where she was one of the only two students who obtained First division in the Cambridge School Examination. She studied for A-Level Examinations at Limuru Girls' High School before being selected to attend the University of East Africa (now University of Dar es Salaam). During her studies, she worked in the late 1960s as an intern for a Kenyan children's development program.

Graduating in 1970, Pala continued her education, earning a master's degree in education from Harvard University. She returned to Kenya in 1973 and took a post as a junior researcher with the Institute of Development Studies at the University of Nairobi Receiving a Rockefeller Foundation grant, she returned to Harvard, earning a PhD in anthropology. Her thesis Changes in Economy and Ideology: A Study of Joluo of Kenya, with Special Reference to Women was completed in 1977. It evaluated how land reforms requiring individualized property registration had diminished women's ability to make inheritance decisions over cattle and land. According to scholars Wanjiku Mukabi Kabira, Elizabeth Auma, and Brender Akoth, Pala is one of the pioneering "Kenyan women intellectuals". In 1977, she became one of the founders of the Association of African Women for Research and Development (AAWORD), an organization established to promote women's studies and research on African women by African women. She brought the ideas of the women's liberation movement into policy discussions on empowering women and seeking parity through the use of African social and knowledge structures, rather than using Eurocentric lenses. Around the same time she married a diplomat, Michael G. Okeyo, who was a member of the Kenyan delegation to the United Nations.

== Career ==
After her graduation, Pala was hired as a liaison officer for the World Conference on the United Nations Decade for Women and in the 1980s presented lectures to women's groups in New York City. She attended the 1980 World Conference on Women in Copenhagen, Denmark, and with other African feminists introduced Afrocentric ideas on women and the environment. While in New York, she also worked as a consultant to the United Nations Educational, Scientific and Cultural Organization (UNESCO) and the United Nations International Children's Emergency Fund. As a researcher, she worked for the Population Council, a health initiative for the United Nations University's Center for Policy Studies which focuses on reproductive health, HIV/AIDS, and public health issues facing women, children, and the poor. She was a member of the independent experts panel, which advised the World Food Council on reducing malnutrition and hunger. Returning to Kenya, she resumed her post as a research fellow at the University of Nairobi in the area of development policy.

Pala and her husband had three children before returning to New York in 1984 for a year, during which she gave lectures on the challenges women faced in developing countries. She attended the development conference held that year in Bangalore, India, which saw the founding of the Development Alternatives with Women for a New Era (DAWN) with Pala as one of the founding members from Africa. The organization is a network for feminist academics and activists focused on the Global South. When the family returned to Kenya in 1985, she and other feminists pushed the government, which had no ministry to deal with women's issues, to create a women's department within the Ministry of Social Services. Working with Esther Jonathan Wandeka, the newly appointed head of the department, they pressed the government to support hosting the Third World Conference on Women in Nairobi. Although they faced resistance, she and Johnson secured authorization for the conference. In 1986, she became head of social science research at the International Centre of Insect Physiology and Ecology. She worked there for five years to interface the center's research to include socio-economic considerations, before becoming the chief of the Africa Section of the United Nations Development Fund for Women (UNIFEM).

Pala had been involved in the pacifist movement since her school days, attending a peace conference in Sweden in 1976. In the 1990s with turmoil in many African countries, she proposed to the director of UNIFEM that they adopt a traditional African custom to promote peace. During the independence movements, of the 1960s, Julius Nyerere had walked an independence torch from Dar es Salaam to Arusha. The journey and torch became a symbol uniting people on its path to the cause. Similarly, Pala promoted using a torch to symbolize women's commitment to peace. The idea was introduced for the 1995 World Conference on Women hosted in Beijing, China. After the conference, she was able to convince UNIFEM to establish an office in Nairobi and adopt a policy under which in Kenya, the UNIFEM programs were to be headed by African women. After retiring from UNIFEM, Pala focused on grassroots women's organizations, which focused on social change and women's empowerment.

== Research ==
Some of her earliest works examined the negative impacts public policies have had on women. One study examined whether women could qualify for government assistance to improve their use of their lands. Because the policy in the Nyanza Province required that 15 acres of land had to be under cultivation, very few women were able to obtain government aid grants as most title registrations were held by men. Further, because the system of registration favored husbands or sons, women's traditional role in distributing land was subverted and resulted in an overall loss of social status for women.

Later works dealt with the rights of African feminists to establish their own priorities based upon their own cultural traditions. Noting that those traditions were not stagnant, as they had been shaped by colonialism, Pala recognized that the global resistance traditions in Black society to subjugation were often used by authorities to dehumanize communities and destroy their socio-economic structures. Pala also cautioned against developing policies and frameworks for African women based on the diasporic experiences of people who had been forced to migrate to the Caribbean, Europe, North America, and South America.

== See also ==
- List of peace activists

== Selected works ==
- Pala, Achola O. (1978). Women's Access to Land and Their Role in Agriculture and Decision-Making on the Farm: Experience of the Joluo of Kenya. Nairobi, Kenya: Institute for Development Studies, University of Nairobi. OCLC 5575159.
- Pala, Achola Okeya (May–June 1980). "The Joluo Equation: Land Reform = Lower Status for Women". Ceres. 1 (75). Rome, Italy: Food and Agriculture Organization of the United Nations: 37–92. ISSN 0009-0379.
- Pala Okeyo, Achola (March 1981). "Reflections on Development Myths". Africa Report. 26 (2). New York, New York: Africa-America Institute: 7–10. ISSN 0001-9836.
- Prah, Kwesik; Okeya, Achola Pala (December 1989). "The Role of Social Science in Generating Technologies for the Farming Community in Africa". International Journal of Tropical Insect Science. 10 (6). Cambridge, Cambridgeshire: Cambridge University Press: 777–782. Bibcode:1989IJTIS..10..777P. doi:10.1017/S1742758400012534. ISSN 1742-7584. OCLC 7996515182. S2CID 86725255.
- Pala, Achola O. (1995). Connecting Across Cultures and Continents: Black Women Speak Out on Identity, Race, and Development. New York, New York: United Nations Development Fund for Women. ISBN 978-0-912917-35-1.
- Pala, Achola O. (2005). "16. Definitions of Women and Development: An African Perspective". In Oyèwùmí, Oyèrónké (ed.). African Gender Studies: A Reader (1st ed.). New York, New York: Palgrave Macmillan. pp. 299–312. ISBN 978-1-4039-6282-9.
