= Jennifer Radloff =

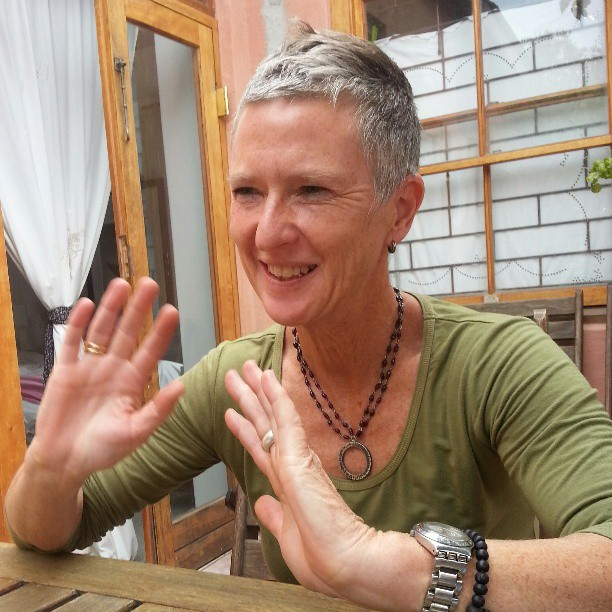
- Jennifer Radloff in 2015, by Robert Hamblin
- Occupation: APC Women's Rights Programme
- Years active: 1980s - present
- Known for: Pioneer on ICT for social justice South Africa

Jennifer Radloff (born 1961, Durban) is a South African feminist activist and a pioneer on Information and communications technology (ICT) for social justice. She works for the Association for Progressive Communications (APC) in the Women's Rights Programme and is a board member of Women's Net.

== Career ==
Radloff is a South African activist who has been involved in women's rights since 1992, with a special focus on access to technology and ICT and capacity-building through digital security and digital storytelling. She created, along with APC's Women's Rights Programme, the Gender and Evaluation Methodology for Internet and ICTs, a learning tool that integrates a gender analysis in the evaluation of initiatives that use ICTs for social change that has been used by over 100 community-based organisations in over 25 countries.

Between 1995 and 2002, she worked as the communications manager at the African Gender Institute, a feminist research and teaching group that studies issues related to gender in Africa. She has undertaken consultancies for UNDP, United Nations Division for the Advancement of Women and Rockefeller Foundation, and presented at numerous international and regional conferences, training and capacity building workshops and strategic dialogues.

Before joining APC, she worked at the University of Cape Town in the Social Justice Resource Project setting up an alternative resource centre, and then moved to the African Gender Institute to lead the communications and networking programme. While at the African Gender Institute she organised the first pan-African consultative workshop to link up librarians in Africa using email in order to share indigenous knowledge. She is a trainer and facilitator and has managed many projects, including GenARDIS – Gender, Agriculture and Rural Development in the Information Society. Radloff was involved in the formation of Women'sNet in South Africa, and was on the board until the end of 2016. She serves on the executive committee of the Women Human Rights Defenders International Coalition.

== Publications ==
=== Contributions to books ===
- ‘Toward a Social Compact for Digital Privacy and Security’, for the Centre for International Governance Innovation and Chatham House (2016)
- ‘Hacking exclusion: African feminists engagements and disruption of the internet’, for Heinrich Böll Stiftung (2015)
- ‘Shifting Power and Human Rights Diplomacy’, for Amnesty International (2014)
- ‘Grassroots women’s information’ in Information Sources in Women’s Studies and Feminism. Co-authored with Dr Jane Bennett (2002)
- ‘The relevance and appropriateness of new information technologies for women in Africa’. Co-authored with Ruth Ojiambo Ochieng, in Superhighway or footpath? Knowledge, Information and Development (2001)
- ‘African Women's Networking and Mechanisms for supporting Women's use of the superhighway’. Co-authored with Sonja Boezak, for Panos Institute (2000)
- ‘Women's Information Services and Networks in Africa’, in Women's Information Services and Networks, KIT & IIAV, Amsterdam (1999)

=== Articles and journals ===
- ‘Why Should Human Rights Funders Care About Digital Security?’ (2017)
- ‘Digital Storytelling: All our stories are true and they are ours!’, for GenderIT.org (2016)
- ‘Tools for movement builders: ICT Toolkit and We Rise’, for GenderIT.org (2016)
- ‘Hacking exclusion: African feminists engagements and disruption of the internet’, for GenderIT.org (2015)
- ‘Digital Security – from silencing to claiming safe spaces’, for GenderIT.org (2014)
- ‘Cómo influye el activismo en tu experiencia como ciudadana de internet’, for GenderIT.org (2013)
- ‘How activism shapes your experience of being a citizen on the internet’, for GenderIT.org (2013)
- ‘Hacking Exclusion: African Feminist Engagements and Disruptions of the Internet’ (2015), in #GameChanger: How is new media changing political participation in Africa? (2015)
- Feminist Africa 18: e-spaces e-politics (2014)
- ‘Editorial: Feminist engagements with 21st-century communications technology’, in Feminist Africa 18 (2014)
- ‘Digital Security as Feminist Practice’, in Feminist Africa 18 (2014)
- ‘African cyberfeminism in the 21st century’, in Open Democracy (2014)
- ‘In Conversation: Jennifer Radloff and Jan Moolman on technology-related violence against women’, in Feminist Africa 18 (2014)
- Various articles for http://www.genderit.org/ (2007–present)
- ‘The Role of Information and Communication Technologies in the Development of African Women’, with Natasha Primo and Alice Munya (2004)
- ‘Claiming Cyberspace: Communication and Networking for Social Change and Women's Empowerment’, in Feminist Africa, Issue 4 (2004)
- ‘Net Gains for Women in Africa’, in Journal of the Society for International Development 45, with Natasha Primo (2002)
- ‘Form and Content in African women’s electronic networks’, in Association of Concerned African Scholars Bulletin (2001)
- ‘Relevant and accessible electronic information networking in Africa’ in Agenda No:38, with Ruth Ojiambo Ochieng (1998)
