= June Nash =

American anthropologist (1927–2019)

June C. Nash (May 30, 1927 – December 9, 2019) was a social and feminist anthropologist and Distinguished Professor Emerita at the Graduate Center of the City University of New York. She conducted extensive field work throughout the United States and Latin America, most notably in Bolivia, Mexico and Guatemala. She was also a part of feminist and working class social movements such as that of the Zapatistas in Mexico.

== Early life and education ==
June Caprice Bousley was born in Salem, Massachusetts in 1927 to Joseph and Josephine (Salloway) Bousley. She graduated with a Bachelor's degree in economics from Barnard College in New York City. After graduation, she worked for a year in Washington D.C. as a statistician before deciding to travel to Mexico. She first spent some time in Acapulco, but decided to travel to the mountains of Chiapas, Mexico where she worked alongside the American Friends Service Committee on various projects in Maya communities.

With a new interest in Maya peoples, Nash returned to the United States to pursue graduate studies, ultimately receiving both her Master's degree and doctorate from the Department of Anthropology at the University of Chicago in 1960. Her dissertation "Social relations in Amatenango del Valle: an Activity Analysis" detailed the social conditions of this town in Chiapas, Mexico.

== Career ==
Nash had a prolific career as an anthropologist spanning 50 years of field work and scholarship. She taught at Yale University and New York University before coming to the Cit University of New York in 1990. Her work was published in a wide variety of journals including the Southwestern Journal of Anthropology, Human Organization, the Journal of Black Studies, the Annals of the New York Academy of Sciences, American Ethnologist, International Labor and Working Class History, the Anthropology of Work Review, and the Indiana Journal of Global Legal Studies. She also contributed to the creation of two ethnographic films, I Spent My Life in the Mines, based on her work in Bolivia, and Community and Industrial Cycle, based on her work with General Electric employees in Pittsfield, Massachusetts.

She received a number of awards, including the Conrad Arensburg Award for Ethnological Studies (1992), the American Anthropological Association's Distinguished Service Award (1995) and the Kalman Silvert Award of the Latin American Studies Association (2004).

The Roseberry-Nash Award for a graduate student paper was created in 2006 in honor of the contributions June Nash and William Roseberry have made to Latin American anthropology. The June Nash Travel Award was also created to honor Nash and is awarded by the Society for the Anthropology of Work to help fund a graduate student's participation in the annual AAA meetings.

=== Field work ===
Kay Warren has described Nash's work and creativity as "inherently oppositional." Nash's political activism could be found throughout her various field work projects. The overlap of ethnography with this activism allows her work to function as social criticism. Her methodology for doing ethnography was to create a dialogue with the people with whom she lives. In an interview with Smith College she shared her views of anthropology and field work: "I think anthropology is very comprehensive. It takes into account all aspects of life," she explains. "It's a method of living with people."

Nash began her field work in Chiapas and continued to return there throughout her career. She continued to make field visits to Mexico and Guatemala, focusing her research on ecology and alternative development models.

==== Tin mining in Bolivia ====
Nash traveled to Bolivia where she applied Marxist theory to analyze structural violence in the lives of tin miners. In the preface to We Eat the Mines and the Mines Eat Us (1979) she describes her work as follows:

"This book recounts the story of the people in their struggle to maintain their way of life. Given this background of massacres, resistance, and protest, the courage they show in this current situation is remarkable. It should be an inspiration for those who maintain that progress can be made only when the rank and file of workers are the architects of the institutions in which they work and lie, just as it is a refutation of those who reject the primary role of workers in bringing about such a future" (xxi)

The book exemplifies Nash's ability to provide personal, ethnographic accounts while contextualizing the individual experience in the social and economic conditions of the place. Her methodology of demonstrating local experiences of political processes via ethnography was ground-breaking for the time and foreshadowed the push for more interactive and participatory ethnography work being done today.

In 1992, her biography of Juan Rojas and his family, first published in 1976 in Spanish as He Agotado Mi Vida en las Minas, was published in English as I Spent My Life in the Mines.. Nash formed a strong bond with Rojas and his family throughout her field work, allowing her to learn about the life of a tin miner. The 1992 English version of the biography includes updated chapters on Roja's wife and grown children. Nash describes her relationship with Rojas as well as her position as an anthropologist speaking for others in the introduction to the book: "In many ways I feel that I was selected by Juan to be the medium through which he could narrate his life story" (pqg3 7) Rojas and Nash, along with the help of Eduardo Ibanez, shared the stories of this book via an ethnographic film documentary of the same name (I Spent My Life in the Mines) in 1977.

==== Capitalism and globalization ====
From her use of Marxist theory to her critique of globalization, Nash's scholarship consistently contributed to the critique of global capitalism. She decided to return to the United States and study corporations there after tin miners in Bolivia asked her about the conditions of working for corporations in the U.S. This motivation resulted in her monograph about General Electric workers at a plant in Pittsfield, Massachusetts (1989).

Following that, she returned to Chiapas and published Crafts in the World Market: the Impact of Global Exchange on Middle American Artisans detailing the ways in which traditional artisans were involved in the global market. Nash's most recent publications continue to analyze the ways in which globalization articulates itself at the local level. For example, her article entitled "Consuming Interests: Water, Rum, and Coca-Cola from Ritual Propitiation to Corporate Expropriation in Highland Chiapas" is a comparative study of Guatemala and Chiapas and the way the alcoholic beverage rum and Coca-Cola has been promoted and accepted for traditional and ritual uses.

==== Chiapas and the Zapatistas ====
Nash published extensively on various topics in Maya communities in Chiapas, ranging from discussions of violence, political anthropology and artisan practices. Since the 1994 Zapatista rebellion, Nash provided commentary on the social movement from her unique perspective as an anthropologist who has worked in the Chiapas area since the 1950s. She described the political organizing of the movement as “radical democratic mobilization” under a system that excludes indigenous peoples. Nash also emphasized that Zapatistas are responding to a global trend to militarize conflicts that involve indigenous peoples.

According to Nash, the Zapatistas are unique because women make up 30% of the movement's participants. She attributed the elevated status of women in the state of Chiapas to the formation of a women-led pottery collective in the 1970s. Though the collective was not active from the 1970s to the present, it was reactivated under the Zapatistas and has been a continuing source of strength for women in the area.

In her book Mayan Visions, she discusses the Maya of Chiapas from a historic perspective, and then brings the reader to the present to better understand how and why the Zapatista movement came to be under the forces of global capitalism and globalization.

== Gender in Latin America ==
Nash played an important role in establishing gender as an area of study in Latin America. Her edited volumes Sex and Class in Latin America (1976) with Helen Safa and Women, Men and the International Division of Labor with Maria P. Fernandez-Kelly both anticipated future scholarship in which sex and gender were analyzed as unique areas of inquiry. Nash boldly states in her introduction to the Sex and Class in Latin America volume,

"They (women) mediate between men in the nerve centers of complex societies, seen but rarely heard, stimulating production over which they have no control, becoming consumers of products they inspire but do not produce, and finally becoming “consumed”- petted, admired and seduced- by the men who produce them."(page 9)

Her feminist analysis was closely tied to her background in class and (re)production and was among the first critical analysis of its time of women in Latin America.

Since then, particularly in her work with the Zapatistas, Nash was criticized by some second-wave feminists for essentializing gender roles in her discussion of Latin American social movements. She wrote about the revitalization of traditional gender roles in the Zapatista movement, and responded to criticism by arguing that self-essentializing is a valuable tool for women participating in Latin American social movements. Warren shares the following excerpt from Mayan Visions to demonstrate Nash's argument:

"Just as the referential system of religion in the politics of indigenous peoples raises hackles with the sophisticated outside observer, so too does the self-referential language of motherhood and identification with the earth often used by women in these movements. In the postmodern, deconstructive mode now fashionable in anthropology, the very category of women is decried as essentialist.. . . We must go beyond deconstruction of the rhetoric to discover the incentives generating a common collective image among indigenous movements."

== Personal life ==
In 1951, June C. Bousley married Manning Nash (1924–2001), a fellow graduate student in anthropology at the University of Chicago. After completing her master's degree in 1953, she joined him in Guatemala for fieldwork. In 1960 and 1961, she conducted fieldwork in Burma with her husband, collaborating on research relating to marriage, family, and population growth. Later, in 1972, she married New York University sociology professor Herbert Menzel (1921–1987), and in 1997 she married again to Frank Reynolds, professor of history of religions and Buddhist studies at the University of Chicago Divinity School. She had two children, Eric and Laura, from her first marriage.

Nash died on December 9, 2019, at the age of 92.

== Selected works ==
- 2007 "Consuming Interests: Water, Rum, and Coca-Cola from Ritual Propitiation to Corporate Expropriation in Highland Chiapas" in Cultural Anthropology, Volume 22, number 4.
- 2003 "The Integration of Indigenous People in Civil Society" in Social Analysis, Volume 47, number 1.
- 2003 "The War of the Peace in Chiapas: Indigenous Women's Struggle for Peace and Justice," pages 285–312 in What Justice? Whose Justice? Fighting for Fairness in Latin America, Susan Eva Eckstein and Timothy P. Wickham-Crowley, eds. Berkeley: University of California Press.
- 2003 "Mesoamerican Indigenous Women and Religion" in Latino(a) Research Review, Volume 5, number 2–3.
- 2003 "The Domestication of Military Violence" in the Society for Feminist Anthropologists' Anthropology Newsletter.
- 2003 "Mexico Turns South for its Future," pages 6–10 in Society for the Anthropology of North America, Volume 6, number 1 (June).
- 2003 "Indigenous Development Alternatives," pages 57–98 in Urban Anthropology and Studies of Cultural Systems, Volume 32, number 1.
- 2002 "Postscript: Gender in Place and Culture," in Gender's Place: Feminist Anthropologies of Latin America, Rosario Montoya, Lessie Jo Frazier, and Janise Hurtig, eds. New York and London: Routledge Press.
- 2002 "Globalization and the Cultivation of Peripheral Vision," pages 5–20 in Anthropology Today, Volume 17, number 4 (August).
- 2001 "Ethnicity, Race, and Gender: Intersection in the Americas, Opportunities for Dialogue and Advancement within the International Human Rights Framework" in Race, Gender, Ethnicity and Human Rights in the Americas: A New Paradigm for Activists, Celina Romany, ed.
- 2001. Mayan Visions: The Quest for Autonomy in an Age of Globalization. New York and London: Routledge Press.
- 2000 "Gender, Ethnicity, and Migration: Teaching Diversity" in Cultural Diversity in the United States, Ida Susser, ed. London and New York: Blackwell Publications.
- 2000 "Gendered Deities and the Survival of Culture," pages 297–316 in Gender/Bodies, Religion, Sylvia Marcos, ed. Cuernavaca, Mexico: Aler Books.
- 1997 "The Fiesta of the Word: The Zapatista Uprising and Radical Democracy in Mexico" pages 261–274 in American Anthropology. Volume 99(2).
- 1993 Crafts in the World Market: The Impact of Global Exchange on Middle American Artisans. Albany: State University of New York Press.
- 1992 I Spent My Life in the Mines: The Story of Juan Rojas, Bolivian Tin Miner. New York: Columbia University Press.
- 1989 From Tank Town to High Tech: The Clash of Community and Industrial Cycles. Albany : State University of New York Press.
- 1981 "Ethnographic Aspects of the World Capitalist System" pages 393–423 in Annual Review of Anthropology, Volume 10(1).
- 1979 We Eat the Mines and the Mines Eat Us: Dependency and Exploitation in Bolivian Tin Mines. New York: Columbia University Press.
- 1970 In the Eyes of the Ancestors: Belief and Behavior in a Mayan Community. New Haven: Yale University Press.
