= Manning Nash =

American anthropologist and ethnographer

Manning Nash (March 4, 1924 – December 12, 2001) was an anthropologist and ethnographer, professor of anthropology at the University of Chicago until his retirement in 1994, and a specialist in the study of the modernization of developing nations in Latin America and Asia. Nash conducted the first anthropological study of a factory in a Third World country, and his expertise in modernization of developing nations led to his fieldwork in Guatemala, Mexico, Burma, Iran, and Malaysia.

== Early life and education ==
Nash was born in Philadelphia, Pennsylvania in 1924. He received his bachelor's degree from Temple University in 1949 and his Ph.D. from the University of Chicago in 1955.

In 1951, he married June C. Bousley, a fellow graduate student in anthropology at the University of Chicago. After completing her master's degree in 1953, she joined him in Guatemala for fieldwork. In 1960 and 1961, Manning and June Nash conducted fieldwork in Burma, collaborating on research relating to marriage, family, and population growth.

== Research and work ==
Nash's anthropological studies predicted the impact corporations and governments would have on people in villages around the world, which would later be referred to as third world countries.

From 1958 to 1963, Nash was editor of the journal on developing nations, Economic Development and Cultural Change. He served on the faculty of the University of California, Los Angeles and at the University of Washington. In the 1950s, he was one of the first anthropologists to join the faculty of a business school when he was hired to teach for the University of Chicago Graduate School of Business. Nash returned to Chicago in 1957 as an assistant professor. He became a full-time faculty member in the department of anthropology 1968, and he served as chairman of the department from 1988 to 1991.

Nash's core elements of ethnicity

1. kinship - "presumed biological and descent unity of a group"
2. Commensality - "the propriety of eating together"
3. common cult - "a value system beyond time and empirical circumstance"

=== Published works ===
- The Cauldron of Ethnicity in the Modern World by Manning Nash (Apr 15, 1993)
- Unfinished Agenda: The Dynamics of Modernization in Developing Nations by Manning Nash (Aug 1984)
- Machine Age Maya: The Industrialization of a Guatemalan Community.
- Peasant Citizens: Politics, Religion, and Modernization in Kelantan, Malaysia (1974)
- Primitive and Peasant Economic Systems (1966)
- The Golden Road to Modernity: Village Life in Contemporary Burma. (1965)
- Graduate thesis: "Rural to Urban Negro Migrants' Attitudes Towards Civil-Political Rights and Religion."

== External Sources ==
- Guide to the Manning Nash Papers 1942-1988 at the University of Chicago Special Collections Research Center
