= Silvert Award =

Award for studies of Latin America

The Kalman H. Silvert Award was created in honor of the first president of the Latin American Studies Association. Given every 18 months, the Silvert Award "recognizes senior members of the profession who have made distinguished lifetime contributions to the study of Latin America."

== Recipients ==
- John J. Johnson (1983)
- Federico Gil (1985)
- Albert O. Hirschman (1986)
- Charles Wagley (1988)
- Lewis Hanke (1989)
- Victor L. Urquidi (1991)
- George Kubler (1992)
- Osvaldo Sunkel (1994)
- Richard Fagen (1995)
- Alain Touraine (1997)
- Richard Adams (1998)
- Jean Franco (2000)
- Thomas Skidmore (2001)
- Guillermo O'Donnell (2003)
- June Nash (2004)
- Miguel León-Portilla (2006)
- Helen Safa (2007)
- Alfred Stepan (2009)
- Edelberto Torres Rivas (2010)
- Julio Cotler (2012)
- Peter H. Smith (2013)
- Tulio Halperin-Donghi (2014)
- Manuel Antonio Garretón (2015)
- Rodolfo Stavenhagen (2016)
- Marysa Navarro (2017)
- Carmen Diana Deere (2018)
- Lars Schoultz (2019)
- Wayne A. Cornelius (2020)
- Sueli Carneiro (2021)
- Ronald H. Chilcote (2022)
- Susan Eckstein (2023)
