= Carmen Diana Deere =

American feminist economist (born 1945)

- Born: August 1, 1945 (age 81); Carlsbad, New Mexico, USA
- Awards: Silvert Award

Academic background
- Education: University of Colorado Boulder; Tufts University; University of California, Berkeley
- Doctoral advisor: Alain de Janvry

Academic work
- Discipline: Economics
- Sub-discipline: Feminist economics; Gender studies; Latino studies
- Institutions: University of Florida; University of Massachusetts Amherst
- Main interests: Land policy and agrarian reform; Rural social movements; Gender in Latin American development

Carmen Diana Deere (born August 1, 1945) is an American feminist economist who is an expert on land policy and agrarian reform, rural social movements, and gender in Latin American development. Deere is Professor Emeritus of Latin American studies and Food Resources Economics at the University of Florida and Professor Emeritus of FLACSO-Ecuador. She was honored with the Silvert Award in 2018.

== Early life and education ==
Carmen Diana Deere was born in Carlsbad, New Mexico, August 1, 1945. She received a BA in International Politics and Economics from the University of Colorado, an MA in Development studies from The Fletcher School at Tufts University (1968), and a Ph.D. in Agricultural economics from the University of California, Berkeley (1978).

== Career and research ==
From 1992 to 2004, she served as Director of Latin American studies and the Center for Latin America, Caribbean and Latino Studies at the University of Massachusetts Amherst. From 2004 to 2011, she was a professor of agricultural economics and Latin American studies at the University of Florida where from 2004 to 2009, she directed the Center for Latin American Studies. She has also been a consultant for the United Nations Development Programme on Brazil (2004) and has participated in various programs on gender in Latin American universities. Between 2009 and 2010, she was a visiting researcher at the Latin American Faculty of Social Sciences-Ecuador where she conducted a national study on gender and asset ownership.

Deere has been the president of the Latin American Studies Association, the organization that brings together experts in Latin America from all disciplines and various occupational areas throughout the world with more than 12,000 members, and the New England Council of Latin American Studies (NECLAS). She currently participates in the editorial committee of several specialized journals such as the Journal of Agrarian Change, and associate editor of the journal, Feminist Economics.

She has received numerous research grants, including from the Ford Foundation, to carry out a comparative study on gender and land rights in Latin America and the publications of the results (1997-2001), as well as from the World Bank, to carry out research on women and land rights in Latin America. From 2013 to 2015, funded by UN Women, Deere conducted international research, the "Gender Asset Gap Project," focused on improving statistics on gender and assets as well as analysis of women's intra-household bargaining power.

Deere currently participates in the "International Panel on Social Progress" (IPSP), convened by Amartya Sen and continues to develop research in Ecuador (FLACSO) and in Cuba with the University of Havana within the collaboration project in the agricultural sector and the international economy: challenges and opportunities for Cuba and the United States.

Deere was influenced by Stephen Resnick and Richard D. Wolff, Marxist economists, and her early work with Magdalena León de Leal.

== Awards and honours ==
- 1996, Bacardi Family Eminent Scholar Chair in Latin American Studies, University of Florida
- 1997, Chancellor's Medal, University of Massachusetts Amherst
- 2000, Fulbright-Hays scholar, Federal University of Rio de Janeiro
- 2018, Silvert Award

=== Award-winning books and papers ===
- 2006, James A. Robertson Prize, Conference on Latin American History, for "Liberalism and Married Women’s Property Rights", best article, The Hispanic American Historical Review, 2005
- 2003, Bryce Wood Book Award, Latin American Studies Association, for Empowering Women
- 2002, Best Book Award, NECLAS, for Empowering Women
- 2002, Best Book Award, Latino Literary Hall of Fame, History Division, for Empowering Women
- 2002, Best Book Award, Cuban Academy of Sciences, Social Science Division, for Historias Agrarias
- 2001, Best Book Award, University of Havana, for Historias Agrarias
- 1998, Joseph P. Criscenti Best Article Award, NECLAS, for "Here Come the Yankees!"
- 1991, Best Book Award, NECLAS, for Household and Class Relations

== Selected works ==
- Deere, Carmen Diana; Leal, Magdalena León de (2001 - 2014). Empowering Women: Land and Property Rights in Latin America. University of Pittsburgh Press. ISBN 9780822972327.
- Baranyi, Stephen, Manuel Morales y Carmen Diana Deere, (2004). Land and development in Latin America: Openings for policy research. Ottawa: The North – South Institute: International development.
- Deere, Carmen Diana; Leal, Magdalena León de (2002). Género, propiedad y Empoderamiento: tierra, estado y mercado en América Latina. PUEG. ISBN 9789683699367. (Text)
- Deer, C. D. (2005). The feminization of agriculture? Economic restructuring in rural Latin America. ISBN 92-9085-049-3.
- Deere, Carmen Diana y Cheryl Doss, eds. (2007). Women and the Distribution of Wealth. London and New York City: Routledge.
- Deere, Carmen Diana y Frederick S. Royce, eds. (2009). Rural social movements in Latin America: Organizing for sustainable livehoods. Florida: University Press of Florida.
