= Takyiwaa Manuh =

Ghanaian academic and author

- Born: May 1952 (age 73–74); Kumasi, Ghana
- Occupations: Academic and author

Academic background
- Education: Wesley Girls High School; University of Ghana; University of Dar es Salaam; Indiana University Bloomington

Academic work
- Institutions: University of Ghana

Takyiwaa Manuh (born May 1952) is a Ghanaian academic and author. She is an Emerita Professor of the University of Ghana, and until her retirement in May 2017, she served as the Director of the Social Development Policy Division, of the United Nations Economic Commission for Africa (ECA), located in Addis Ababa, Ethiopia. She was also the Director of the Institute of African Studies, University of Ghana from 2002 to 2009. She is a fellow of the Ghana Academy of Arts and Sciences.

== Early life and education ==
Manuh was born in May 1952 at Kumasi in the Ashanti Region of Ghana to James Kwesi Manuh, who was a food contractor, and Madam Akosua Akyaa, then a trader at Ankaase, a town near Kumasi. Her early education began at Ankaase Methodist School when she lived with her grandmother. While in class one, she was moved to the Adum Presby School, where she began class one once again. She began class one for a third time when she was later sent to Penworth Kindergarten. Manuh went on to complete her primary education at the Kwame Nkrumah University of Science and Technology (KNUST) Primary school also in Kumasi, after which she entered Wesley Girls' High School, Cape Coast, for her secondary education.

She continued her studies at the University of Ghana, where she obtained her Bachelor of Laws degree (LLB) in 1974. In 1978, she was awarded her master's degree in Law from the University of Dar es Salaam. She later went on to pursue a doctorate degree in Anthropology at the Indiana University Bloomington, graduating in the year 2000.

== Career ==
Following her postgraduate studies in Tanzania, Manuh gained employment as a Research Fellow at the University of Ghana in 1979. She has also taught in various schools and faculties at the university. She has been a visiting professor at the Indiana University Bloomington, a Visiting Fellow at the University of Birmingham, and has maintained working ties with University of Cape Town's African Gender Institute since 1999.

Manuh serves on many boards and committees. She is a member of the Scientific Committee of the Association of African Universities (AAU), the Council for the Development of Social Science Research in Africa (CODESRIA), UNESCO's International Institute for Educational Planning (IIEP) Governing Board, the African Gender Institute Board, the Steering Committee of the South-South Exchange Program on the History of Development (SEPHIS), the Steering Committee of NETRIGHT, the ABANTU for Development board of which she chairs, and the Coalition for Women's Rights in Ghana. In 2005, she was elected fellow of the Ghana Academy of Arts and Sciences.

== Awards and honours ==
In 2004, she was the co-winner of the National Women's Business Council Best Paper in Women's Entrepreneurship Award together with Dr. Kojo Saffu of Brock University, Ontario, Canada.

In 2007, Manuh was awarded the University of Ghana's Meritorious Service Award, and in July 2008, she was awarded the Order of the Volta (Officer Class). In 2015, the University of Sussex awarded her an Honorary Doctor of Laws degree.

== Works ==
Manuh's works have been in the areas of Gender and Women in Ghana, women's rights and issues of empowerment in Ghana and Africa, Contemporary African Migrations, and higher education in Africa. Her writings include:

- Ghanaians, Ghanaian-Canadians and Asantes: Citizenship and Identity among Migrants in Toronto? Africa Today 45(3-4): pages 481–494 (1998);
- This Place is not Ghana: Gender and Rights Discourse among Ghanaian Migrants in Toronto, Canada. Ghana Studies Journal 2: pages 77–95;
- The Salt Cooperatives in Ada, Ghana In D. R. F. Taylor and F. Mackenzie (eds), Development From Within: Survival in Rural Africa. Routledge: London and New York. Chapter 5, pages 102–124;
- The Asantehema's Court and its Jurisdiction over Women in Asante: A Study in Legal Pluralism Research Review, (N.S.) Volume 4, Number 2: pages 50–66 also speak to issues in ethnic identity and governance;
- At Home in the World: Contemporary Migration and Development in Ghana and West Africa, SubSaharan Publishers (2005) co-edited (with Amina Mama and Charmaine Pereira);
- An issue of Feminist Africa on "Sexual Cultures.", (2007);
- Change And Transformation In Ghana's Publicly-Funded Universities: A Study of Experiences, Lessons And Opportunities (with Sulley Gariba and Joseph Budu) was published by James Currey, Oxford, and Woeli Publications, Accra;
- Africa after Gender? (with Catherine Cole and Stephan Miescher), Indiana University Press (2007).
