= Florence Thomas =

French-Colombian social psychologist

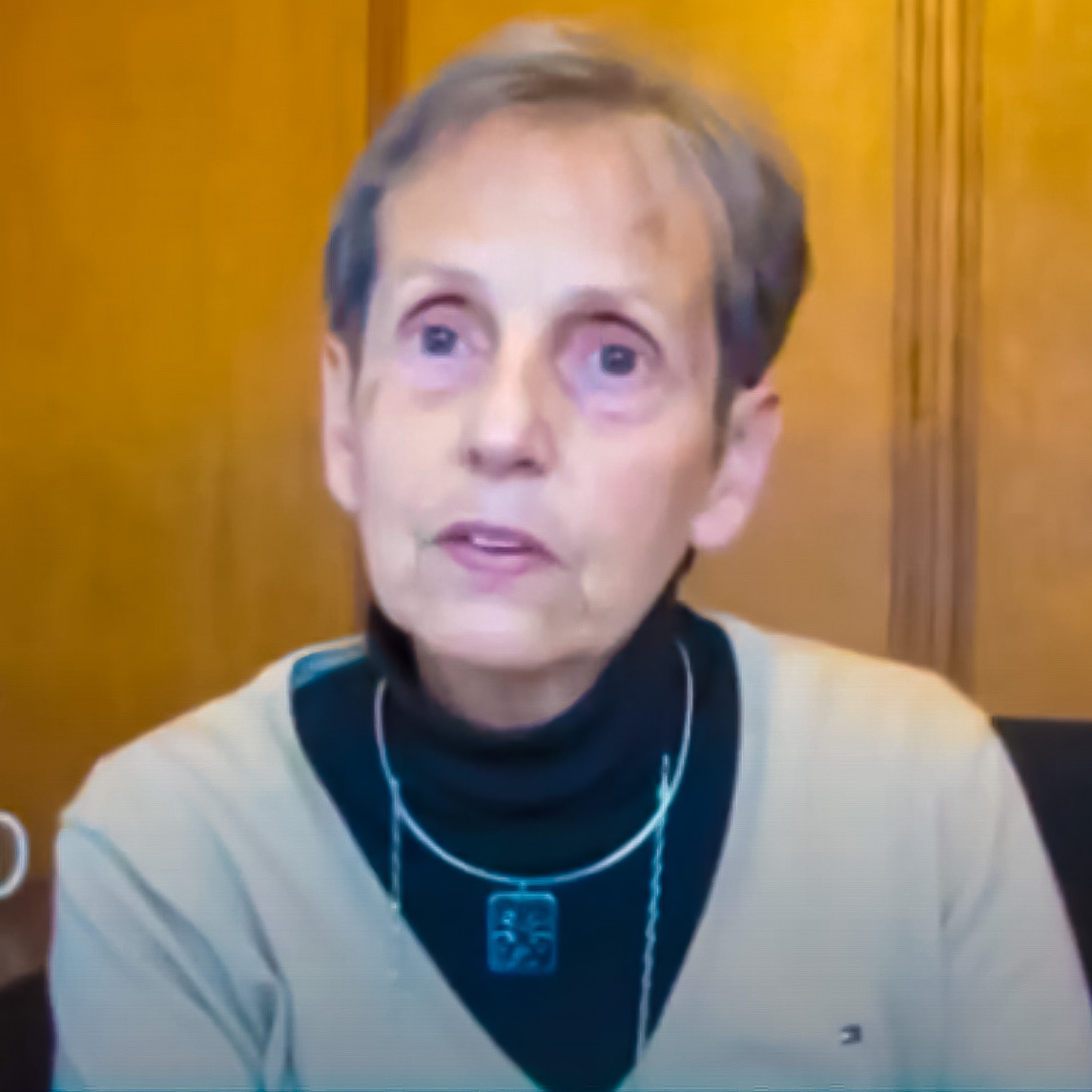
- Thomas in 2013
- Born: Florence Marie Therèse Thomas; 1943 (age 82–83); Rouen, France
- Occupations: academic, journalist, feminist
- Years active: 1967–present

Florence Marie Therèse Thomas (born 1943) is a French-Colombian social psychologist and feminist academic. She was a co-founder of the Programa de Estudios de Género, Mujer y Desarrollo (Gender, Women and Development Studies Program) at the National University of Colombia. She is also a journalist for the newspaper El Tiempo. Thomas was honored with the Premio Nacional de Periodismo Simón Bolívar (Simón Bolívar National Journalism Award) in 2005. In 2017, Thomas was decorated as a Knight in France's Legion of Honour.

== Early life and education ==
Florence Marie Therèse Thomas was born in 1943 in Rouen, in the Normandy region of France, during the bombing raids of World War II. Her father was a lawyer and though her mother wanted to study to become a doctor, social convention did not allow her to study. Her parents were part of the liberal middle-class and encouraged her to further her education. After graduating from secondary school, she moved to Paris and spent six years studying at the University of Paris. A pivotal event during her time in Paris occurred in 1965, when Thomas discovered she was pregnant with a child by her Colombian boyfriend, a fellow student. The pill had only become available in France in 1960 and five years later, abortion was still illegal. Upon confirming her condition, Thomas approached her brother who was a medical student. Unwilling to jeopardize his career, he gave her a referral to a friend, who in turn referred her to an illegal abortionist. She voluntarily terminated the pregnancy, but was angered that society allowed the church, state, or her partner to take away her agency to make her own decision. After the procedure, she continued her studies and graduated with a master's degree in social psychology.

== Career ==
In 1967, Thomas followed her boyfriend Manuel Morales to Colombia, despite her lack of being able to speak Spanish or knowing anything of the country. That year couple married and she was hired to teach Sociology and Psychology at the National University of Colombia. Because she could not speak the language, she lectured in French and a translator interpreted her lectures for her first two semesters. The invisibility of women in public spaces pushed her from leftist activism into feminism. In the 1970s, she invited other women scholars at the National University to informally meet to discuss feminist literature and feminism in relation to their academic work. These activist academics, including Thomas, Juanita Barreto Gama, Guiomar Dueñas Vargas, Magdalena León Gómez, María Martínez, Donny Meertens, Yolanda Puyana Villamizar, María Himelda Ramírez and Ana Rico de Alonso worked to create an interdisciplinary field of study over many years. After a decade of marriage and having had two children, Nicolás and Patrick, Thomas divorced, vowing never to remarry.

From the early 1980s, the academics informally created the Grupo de Estudios Mujer y Sociedad (Women & Society Study Group). Every Thursday at noon, women scholars from the fields of anthropology, history, psychology, and social work gathered in Thomas' office. They officially organized the group in 1985, after overcoming the university's resistance, with Thomas serving as its director. The following year, Women & Society hosted a conference, Mujer y vida cotidiana (Women and Daily Life), drawing 300 women from throughout the country as participants. The success of the seminar led to the creation of another program, La cuestión femenina (The Feminine Question), which was offered annually for the next fifteen years. In 1994, they were successful in launching the Programa de Estudios de Género, Mujer y Desarrollo (PGMD, Gender, Women and Development Studies Program) in the Human Sciences Department at the National University. (Note: In 2001, PGMD was renamed as the "Escuela de Estudios de Género" (Genders Studies School).)

In 1999, she began writing as a columnist for the newspaper El Tiempo and became well known for her outspoken views on feminism. Early in the 2000s, Women & Society were successful in gaining master's degree accreditation for the gender studies program. In 2005, she became only the fifth woman to be honored with the Premio Nacional de Periodismo Simón Bolívar (Simón Bolívar National Journalism Award) in the category of analysis and opinion in press media. Thomas retired from teaching in 2007. In 2009, she and several other public personalities published an article declaring their atheism. In 2011, she was naturalized as Colombian, having not done it previously because of political dissent. In 2017, she was honored as a knight in France's Legion of Honor.

== Research ==
Thomas' work explores the political and legal struggle for human rights for ethnic minorities, indigenous people, LGBT community members, and women. Her work has evaluated the meanings and symbolism of sexism as it appears in popular culture, such as representations of inequality, subordination, and violence in telenovelas, literary tracts, and other cultural media. She has defined feminism as an ethical and political position aimed at building equality in society. She clarifies her position, by acknowledging that men and women are different, but should have the same protections of their rights. (Note: "¿Qué es el feminismo? Es una opción ético-política que lucha por construir equidad entre hombres y mujeres."… Queremos ser iguales como sujetos políticos de derechos, pero queremos mantener nuestras diferencias, porque nacemos de manera distinta".) She also distinguishes between feminism and machismo, noting they are not counterparts because the former is an ideology based upon equity for all and the latter an ideology based on retaining power through violence. (Note: "El feminismo es una ideología libertaria que busca equidad, el machismo es una ideología violenta, de poder. El feminismo es tratar de construir un mundo más equitativo, más justo, más tolerante, más bello para todo el mundo, no solamente para las mujeres, porque si el mundo cambia para las mujeres, va a cambiar también para los hombres. El machismo impide que las mujeres puedan decidir sobre su cuerpo, el machismo apoya el acoso sexual".)

== Selected works ==
- Thomas, Florence (1985). El macho y la hembra reconstruídos: aportes en relación con los conceptos de masculinidad y feminidad en algunos mass-media colombianos; fotonovela, canción, comerciales [The Reconstructed Male and Female: Contributions in Relation to the Concepts of Masculinity and Femininity in Some Colombian Mass Media, Soap Operas, Song, Commercials] (in Spanish) (2a ed.). Bogotá: Editorial Universidad Nacional de Colombia. ISBN 978-958-628-008-2.
- Thomas, Florence (1994). Los estragos del amor: el discurso amoroso en los medios de comunicación [The Ravages of Love: Love Discourse in the Media] (in Spanish) (1. ed.). Bogotá: Editorial Universidad Nacional de Colombia. ISBN 978-958-17-0118-6.
- Thomas, Florence (1997). Conversación con un hombre ausente [Conversation with an Absent Man] (in Spanish) (1. ed.). Bogotá: Arango Editores Ltda. ISBN 978-958-27-0014-0.
- Thomas, Florence (2001). La mujer tiene la palabra [The Woman Has Words] (in Spanish). Bogotá: Editora Aguilar. ISBN 978-958-8061-66-5.
- Thomas, Florence (2003). Género, femenino: un ensayo autobiográfico [Gender, Feminine: An Autobiographical Essay] (PDF) (in Spanish). Bogotá: Editora Aguilar. ISBN 978-958-704-062-3.
- Thomas, Florence (2003). Palabras en el tiempo [Words in Time] (in Spanish). Bogotá: Editora Aguilar. ISBN 978-958-704-108-8.
- Thomas, Florence (2006). Conversaciones con Violeta: historia de una revolución inacabada [Conversations with Violeta: The Story of an Unfinished Revolution] (in Spanish) (1. ed.). Bogotá: Editora Aguilar. ISBN 978-958-704-394-5.
- Thomas, Florence (2008). Florence de la A a la Z [Florence from A to Z] (in Spanish) (1. ed.). Bogotá: Aguilar. ISBN 978-958-704-792-9.
- Thomas, Florence (2010). Habia que decirlo [It Had To Be Said] (in Spanish). Bogotá: Icono. ISBN 978-958-8461-11-3.
