= Elaine Salo =

South African anthropologist, scholar and activist

- Born: Elaine Rosa Salo; 1962; Kimberley, South Africa
- Died: 13 August 2016 (aged 53–54); Newark, Delaware, US
- Spouse: Colin Miller
- Children: Two

Academic background
- Education: University of Cape Town (BA); Clark University (MA); Emory University (PhD)

Academic work
- Discipline: Anthropologist
- Sub-discipline: Ethnography; Gender studies; African feminism; patriarchy; masculinity; water politics; women's movements
- Institutions: University of the Western Cape; University of Cape Town; University of Pretoria; University of Delaware

Elaine Rosa Salo (1962 – 13 August 2016) was a South African anthropologist, scholar and activist, who specialised in gender studies and African feminism. She taught at the University of the Western Cape, the University of Cape Town, the University of Pretoria, and, until her death from cancer, at the University of Delaware.

== Early life and education ==
Salo was born in 1962 in Kimberley, South Africa, grew up under apartheid. She studied anthropology at the University of Cape Town, graduating with a bachelor's and an honours degree. She was a "token" black student in an otherwise White-majority university: the university was located in a White Group Area. Having been awarded a scholarship, she studied international development at Clark University in Massachusetts, United States: she graduated with a Master of Arts (MA) degree in 1986. Also with a scholarship, she studied anthropology at Emory University in Georgia, United States, graduating with a Doctor of Philosophy (PhD) degree in 2004: her doctoral thesis concerned gendered roles in the Manenberg Township of Cape Town, South Africa.

== Academic career ==
Salo taught at universities in South Africa and in the United States. She lectured at the University of the Western Cape from 1988 to 1999; the University of Cape Town from 2000 to 2009; and the University of Pretoria from 2009 to 2013, where she was director of its Institute for Women's & Gender Studies. From 2013, until her death in 2016, she was an associate professor in political science, international relations, and women & gender studies at the University of Delaware.

Her anthropological and ethnological research was focused on African women (including gender studies, African feminism, patriarchy and masculinity, and motherhood), particularly in the township of her doctorate (Manenberg). Her research and teaching also extended to water politics, women's movements, and the anthropology of gender and sexuality.

== Personal life ==
Salo was married to Colin Miller, and together they had two children.

Salo had survived breast cancer, but it returned in the year before her death. She died on 13 August 2016, in Newark, Delaware, USA, aged 54.

== Selected works ==
- Salo, Elaine (2001). "Talking about feminism in Africa". Agenda. 16 (50): 58–63. doi:10.1080/10130950.2001.9675993 (inactive 12 July 2025). JSTOR 4066405.
- Salo, Elaine (August 2003). "Negotiating Gender and Personhood in the New South Africa: Adolescent Women and Gangsters in Manenberg Township on the Cape Flats". European Journal of Cultural Studies. 6 (3): 345–365. doi:10.1177/13675494030063005. S2CID 144419494.
- Elaine Salo (2007). "Mans is ma soe: Ganging Practices in Manenberg, South Africa, and the Ideologies of Masculinity, Gender, and Generational Relations". In Bay, Edna G.; Donham, Donald L. (eds.). States of violence: Politics, youth, and memory in contemporary Africa. Charlottesville: University of Virginia Press. pp. 148–178. ISBN 9780813925776.
- Salo, Elaine R. (2018). Respectable mothers, tough men and good daughters: producing persons in Manenberg township South Africa. Bamenda: Langaa Rearch and Publishing. ISBN 9789956550265.
