= Zenebework Tadesse =

Ethiopian sociologist and activist

- Born: Addis Ababa
- Awards: Fellow of the Ethiopian Academy of Sciences

Academic background
- Education: Binghamton University

Academic work
- Discipline: sociology
- Main interests: democracy, gender and women's land rights in Africa

Zenebework Tadesse (Amharic: ዘነበወርቅ ታደሰ) is an Ethiopian sociologist and activist. She is the first executive director of Association of African Women for Research and Development.

== Early life and education ==
Tadesse was born in Addis Ababa to a Catholic family. Her father worked for the government. She attended a Catholic girls' school, where she was taught by missionary priests. She later studied in the US, where she spent time in Minnesota and Indiana initially studying journalism, later switching to international relations once she realized that the lack of press freedom in Ethiopia would thwart a journalism career. She attended Binghamton University in New York, where she got degrees in Sociology and International Relations. She moved to Chicago, where she was involved in the civil rights movement and the Black Panthers. She later moved to Harlem.

She was a research fellow at the Graduate Centre of the University of South Africa, Ethiopia.

== Career ==
Tadesse is an activist and sociologist who has undertaken significant research on democracy, gender and women's land rights in Africa. She has called for more financial support of women, especially with regards to access to education. Tadesse is a founding member of the Ethiopian Forum for Social Sciences, and the principal vice president of the Ethiopian Academy of Sciences. She is an executive board member of the African Gender Institute and the African Governance Institute. Tadesse was also the Deputy Executive Secretary of CODESRIA from 1987 to 1993 and served as the head of their Publications Programme during her tenure, and later became the first woman to be president of the executive committee at CODESRIA from 2002 to 2005.

In 1977, she was a founding member of the Association of African Women for Research and Development, an organization that she became the first executive director of.

Tadesse has worked with several organizations involved with the United Nations, including being a member of the executive committee of the United Nations Research Institute for Social Development, as well as being a member of the Committee for Development Policy from 2016-2018. Included in her work with development groups was her tenure as Director of Global Fund for Women and Director of Learning Partnership for Women.

Tadesse was a development consultant for Agrarian South: Journal of Political Economy.

== Selected publications ==
In 1976 she wrote a book, The Condition of Women in Ethiopia, that is held in the Rome headquarters of the FAO, but has not been publicly published.

With Yared Amare, she wrote the paper Women's Land Rights in Ethiopia, published in 2000 in the Journal of Ethiopian Women Lawyers Association (No.1 (Summer): 25-51).

In 1984, Tadesse published "Breaking the Silence and Broadening the Frontiers of History: Notes on Recent Studies on African Women in History" as part of the UN Conference "Meeting of Experts on Theoretical Frameworks and Methodological Approaches to Studies on the Role of Women in History as Actors in Economic, Social, Political and Ideological Processes" in Paris during the same year.

Her essay "Africa: A New Look From the Inside" was published in The UNESCO Courier: A Window Open on the World, XXXIII, 7 in 1980.
