= Helen Safa =

Anthropologist, feminist scholar and academic

Helen Icken Safa
- Born: December 4, 1930; Brooklyn
- Died: November 4, 2013 (aged 82); Gainesville, Florida
- Education: Columbia University
- Awards: Silvert Award
- Scientific career
- Fields: Anthropology
- Workplaces: Syracuse University; Rutgers University; University of Florida

Helen M. Icken Safa (December 4, 1930 – November 4, 2013) was an anthropologist, feminist scholar and academic. Safa focused her work on Latin American studies and she served as president of the Latin American Studies Association from 1983 to 1985. She taught anthropology and Latin American studies at Syracuse University, Rutgers University and the University of Florida. She received the Silvert Award, the highest honor given by the Latin American Studies Association.

== Biography ==
Helen Icken was born in 1930 in Brooklyn. Her parents, Gustav Icken and Erna Keune, had grown up a few miles from each other in Germany, but they did not meet until they came to the United States as young adults. Helen Icken went to Germany with her mother for a year when she was four, returning to Brooklyn to begin elementary school. She recalled that she could not speak English when she started school. "I think it was one of the reasons why I always felt marginal to my own culture," she said.

A 1952 graduate of Cornell University, Icken began her research work in Puerto Rico soon thereafter. She enrolled at Columbia University, where she pursued graduate study in anthropology and earned a Ph.D. in 1960. She started her academic career at Syracuse University. In 1962, she married Manoucher Safa-Isfahani; he was from Iran and was working for the United Nations Secretariat in New York. She taught at Rutgers University from 1967 to 1980, chairing the anthropology department and directing the Latin American studies program. From 1980 until her retirement in 1997, she taught at the University of Florida.

Safa was the president of the Latin American Studies Association (LASA) from 1983 to 1985. During her presidency, she received a Ford Foundation grant to establish an exchange program between scholars from the United States and Cuba. Safa also worked to promote LASA's Gender and Feminist Studies section. In 2007, Safa received the Silvert Award from LASA for distinguished contributions to the field. Three years later, the journal Caribbean Studies published a special issue in honor of Safa.

Safa wrote two notable books. The Urban Poor of Puerto Rico (1974) summarized Safa's doctoral dissertation work; anthropologist Jorge Duany called it "a classic account of Puerto Rican culture". Before publishing her second book, The Myth of the Male Breadwinner: Women and Industrialization in the Caribbean (1995), Safa had long conducted research on Puerto Rico's Operation Bootstrap. This book described the effects of such industrial employment initiatives for women in Puerto Rico, the Dominican Republic and Cuba. She was a member of the editorial board of the Latin American Research Review.

Safa's husband died in 1995. She later married John Dumoulin. She died at a Gainesville hospice in 2013.
