= Association of African Women for Research and Development =

Women's organization

- Formation: 1977
- Headquarters: Dakar
- Executive Director: Zenebework Tadesse

The Association of African Women for Research and Development (AAWORD) / Association des Femmes Africaines pour la Recherche et le Développement (AFARD) is an African feminist organization established in Dakar in December 1977. The "first intellectual feminist organization to denounce the living conditions of African women", AAWORD/AFARD "brought together female African intellectuals to promote equal rights between men and women at the continental level and contributed greatly to the advancement of the status of African women".

== History ==
AAWORD/AFARD was created after discussion between women scholars who met in Lusaka in Zambia in December 1976. In its early years, AAWORD was supported by the Council for the Development of Social Science Research in Africa (CODESRIA). In 1977, 1983 and 1988 it held general assemblies in Dakar. In 1995 it held its general assembly in Pretoria, South Africa.

AAWORD sponsors regular conferences, and publishes occasional bilingual papers and bibliographies. In 1986 it started publishing a quarterly newsletter, Echo. In 1990 it established a documentation center.
