= Charmaine Pereira =

Nigerian writer and feminist scholar

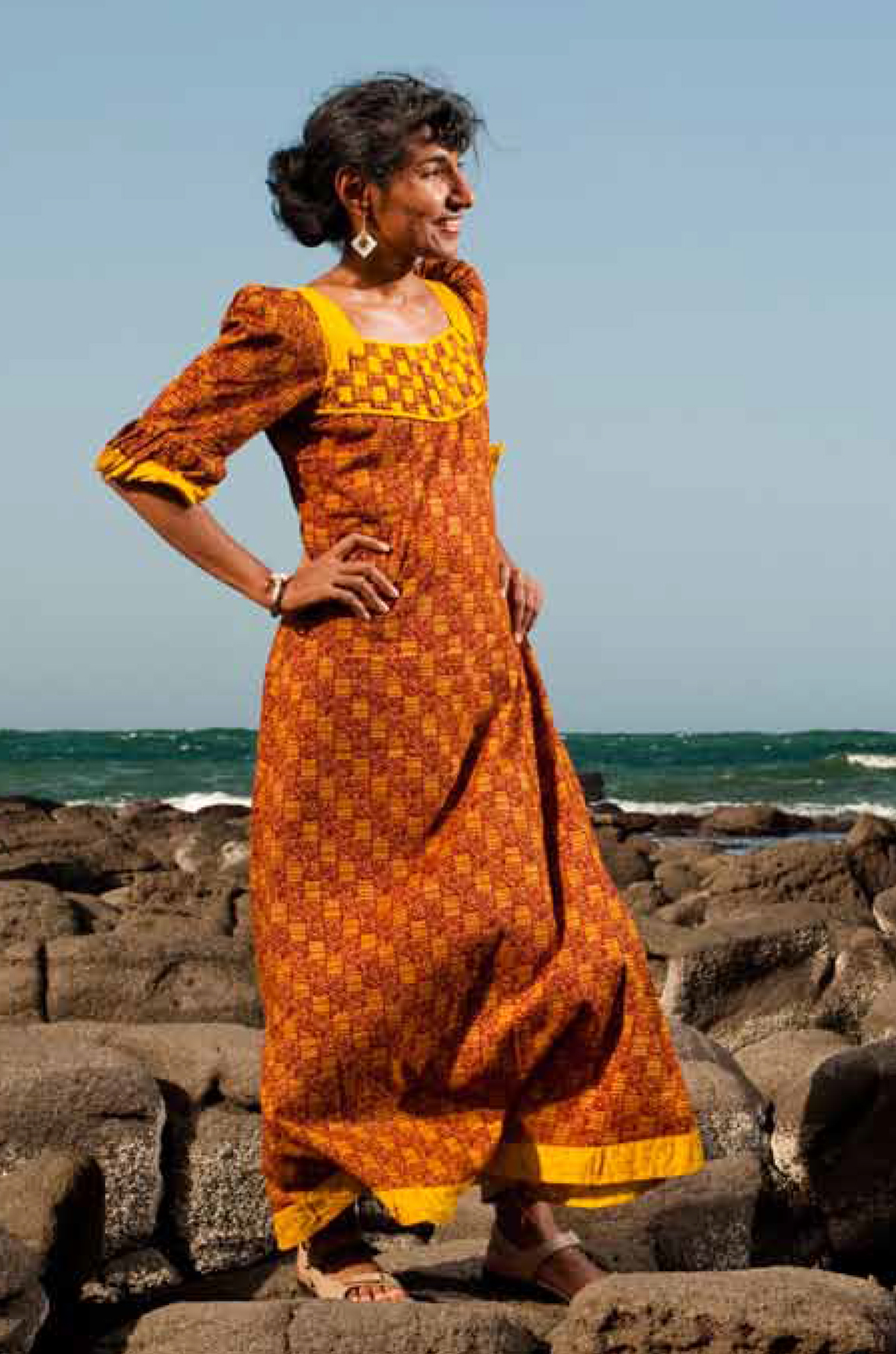

Charmaine Pereira is a writer and feminist scholar in Abuja, Nigeria. Her work centers on feminist thought, sexuality, gender education, and civil society and the state. Pereira is also a coordinator for the Initiative for Women’s Studies in Nigeria. She is a member of Tapestry Consulting, an organization that seeks to create gender equality in the workplace in Africa.

== Biography ==
In 1991, Pereira received a Ph.D. in Psychology of Education from The Open University.

In 2004, Charmaine Pereira co-edited Jacketed Women: Qualitative Research Methodologies on Sexualities and Gender in Africa with Jane Bennett.

Pereira currently teaches in the Sociology department at Ahmadu Bello University. Her work explores the challenges that a researcher encounters when interrogating the intersectionality of culture, gender, sexuality, law, and religion.

== Selected publications ==
- Pereira, Charmaine. Gender in the Making of the Nigerian University System. James Currey, 2007.
- Pereira, Charmaine, editor. Changing Narratives of Sexuality: Contestations, Compliance and Women’s Empowerment. London, New York: Zed Books, 2014.
- Bennett, Jane, and Charmaine Pereira, editors. Jacketed Women: Qualitative Research Methodologies on Sexualities and Gender in Africa. Tokyo, New York, Paris: United Nations University Press, 2013.
- Pereira, Charmaine. “Domesticating Women? Gender, Religion and the State in Nigeria Under Colonial and Military Rule.” African Identities 3.1 (2005): 69-94.

== Other sources ==
- Loans for People on Benefits - Fast Approval - On Screen Decision
- Pereira, Charmaine (2005). "Domesticating women? Gender, religion and the state in Nigeria under colonial and military rule1". African Identities. 3: 69–94. doi:10.1080/14725840500065937. S2CID 144413701.
