= Magdalena León de Leal =

Colombian sociologist (*1939)

Magdalena León
- Born: Magdalena León Gómez; June 30, 1939 (age 87); Barichara, Santander, Colombia
- Other name: Magdalena León de Leal (pen name)
- Occupation: Feminist sociologist
- Spouse: Francisco Leal (m. 1967)

Academic background
- Education: National University of Colombia; University of Washington; University of Wisconsin

Academic work
- Discipline: Sociology
- Sub-discipline: Women's studies
- Institutions: Asociación Colombiana para el Estudio de la Población; National University of Colombia

Magdalena León (née, León Gómez; pen name, Magdalena León de Leal; Barichara, Santander, June 30, 1939) is a Colombian feminist sociologist specializing in social research and women's studies. Trained with the founders of Colombian sociology, Orlando Fals Borda and Camilo Torres Restrepo, she transferred the rhetorical and discursive framework to the analysis of empirical reality using the survey, systematization, and data analysis to learn the reality on the ground, not only of Colombia but also from Latin America.

She has worked in the formulation of policies aimed at the advancement of women. She is the author of La mujer y el desarrollo en Colombia (English: Women and development in Colombia) (1977) recognized as the work that inaugurated the issue of women and development in Colombia from a national perspective both for its incidence in the academic field and for its impact on public policy formulation. Also noteworthy is her research establishing a gender approach on redistribution policies that allowed the recognition of women's work in the rural and agrarian world, claiming land ownership for women as a key to development and the fight against poverty.

== Early life and education ==
Magdalena León Gómez was born in Barichara, Santander, Colombia, June 30, 1939. She was the fifth of nine siblings, seven girls and two boys. Her father was Juan Francisco León, a liberal merchant who owned a fabric store. She had the affection and care of two mother-figures, her mother, Lola Gómez de León and her aunt, Tata, Magdalena explains, recalling her early life. She also remembers the violence in her home town and, as a consequence of threats, the transfer of her family to Bucaramanga when she was seven years old.

She began the third year of elementary school at the Franciscan nuns' school and graduated from high school there. There, in her fifth year of high school, she met Monserrat Ordóñez, a future writer, with whom she struck up a friendship. Educated in Barcelona and with a large library, Ordóñez made it easy for León to connect with books and libraries, awakening her passion for knowledge. In the company of her older brother who had studied medicine, she moved to Bogotá to enroll in the National University of Colombia. She initially decided on studying economics until she was recruited by Orlando Fals Borda and Camilo Torres Restrepo, a pioneer of Liberation theology and co-founder of the first sociology faculty in Latin America. León entered with the first sociology class, a newly founded department at the National University (1959–1962).

The group of students included of four women and twelve or thirteen men and were led by Fals, Torres, and Andrew Pierce; Virginia Gutiérrez de Pineda joined later. León studied various subjects with them: rural sociology taught by Fals, which included field trips to discover and transform reality; methodology with Torres with whom she visited the poor neighborhoods of Bogotá; and family anthropology, with Gutiérrez de Pineda, who, at that time, was conducting pioneering research on the family in Colombia. León graduated in 1963 and was awarded a Rockefeller Foundation scholarship to study at the University of Washington, where she received a master's degree.

In 1967, she married Francisco Leal, a sociology student. After her first daughter, Claudia Maria, was born, León returned to the U.S., to the University of Wisconsin. Later, she gave birth to her second daughter, Marta Biviana.

== Career and research ==
León is recognized as a leading researcher who brought gender studies to rural parts of the world.

In Colombia, León became a teacher at the National University of Colombia, teaching the course on Class Structure and Social Stratification.

In the late 1960s, León met a Spanish feminist with whom she shared reflections on the experiences of being a woman. Key books and their authors were beginning to circulate in bookstores, such as Betty Friedan and her The Feminine Mystique although, as León later explained, at that time, she had no direct contact with liberal feminism or the radical feminism that emerged later in the U.S. It was upon her return to Colombia again and looking for work, when León was confronted with the desire to understand what was happening to the women of her country.

In 1974, at the proposal of the "Asociación Colombiana para el Estudio de la Población" (ACEP; English: Colombian Association for the Study of the Population), ACEP was linked to the project "La participación de la mujer en los procesos de desarrollo económico y social de Colombia" (English: The participation of women in the processes of economic and social development in Colombia). Assuming that development processes improved the living conditions of women in societies in transition towards modernization, the research set out to establish the degree of female participation in the most important areas for social progress and to establish the factors that promoted or impeded such participation. León led an interdisciplinary research team made up of Gutiérrez de Pineda, Cecilia López, Josefina Amézquita de Almeyda, Patricia Pinzón de Lewin, Hernando Ochoa, and Dora Rothlisberger among others. They began to work with urban women. Her work was published with the title, "La mujer y el desarrollo en Colombia" (English: Women and development in Colombia) (1977); it was recognized as the work that inaugurated the issue of women and development in Colombia from a Colombian national perspective due to its incidence in the academic field as well as its impact on the formulation of public policies.

In 1980, León published the research Mujer y capitalismo agrario: Estudio de cuatro regiones colombianas (English: Woman and agrarian capitalism: Study of four Colombian regions), highlighted by the recognition she made of the contribution of the work of rural women and their contribution to the accumulation of capital. The work, influenced by the previous research of the Danish economist Ester Boserup (1970) of studies and policies on "Mujer en Desarrollo" (MED) (Women in Development), was also the first joint work that was followed by numerous collaborations in research on rural women between León and Carmen Diana Deere.

In 1981 and 1982, León compiled and published the three-volume collection, Debate sobre la mujer en América Latina y el Caribe (English: Debate on Women in Latin America and the Caribbean) (1982). In the article, "Política agraria en Colombia y debate sobre políticas para la mujer rural" (English: Agrarian policy in Colombia and debate on policies for rural women), León pointed out the achievements and limitations of the policy for rural women formulated in 1984.

From 1981 to 1986, she developed the "Acciones para transformar las condiciones socio-laborales del servicio doméstico en Colombia" (English: Actions project to transform the socio-labor conditions of domestic service in Colombia), a project that sought not only to understand the phenomenon as such, but also to "transform the labor relations of domestic service". The work had an influence on labor legislation and made it possible to achieve recognition of the rights of female workers, including the law that gave them access to social security. This research generated processes of individual and collective reflection between the employees and the employers, and promoted the organization of the women's union as domestic workers and citizens.

In 1986, León published the study, La mujer y la política agraria en América Latina (English: Women and agrarian policy in Latin America) in which she makes the work of rural women visible, recognizes them as agricultural producers, and characterizes the peasant economy in Latin America as a family farming system, a thesis contrary to that of Boserup who interpreted it as a masculine agricultural system.

After 15 years of research, in 1989, she left the ACEP and returned to the National University of Colombia participating in the "Grupo Mujer y Sociedad" (English: Women and Society Group), and in 1990, she returned as a full professor. In 1994, she created the "Fondo de Documentación Mujer y Género: Ofelia Uribe de Acosta" (English: Women and Gender Documentation Fund: Ofelia Uribe de Acosta), which she directed until 1999. She also promoted the creation of study networks: in 1995 "Red de Masculinidad" (English: Network of Masculinity) was created, and in 1996, "Red de Mujeres y Participación Política" (English: Network of Women and Political Participation), which brought together academic women, trade unionists, politicians, NGOs, and grassroots leaders.

Between 1995 and 1999, during her last years at university, León returned to research on rural women, rethinking their situation more than a decade after her first research. Together with Deere, León carried out a comparative study in twelve Latin American countries. The authors explain the inequality due to male preferences in the granting of inheritance, due to the privileges that men have in marriage, due to masculine bias in state land distribution policies and programs, and due to the gender bias that exists in the market.

In 2001, León and Deere returned to the issue of the situation of rural women with the aim of rethinking their situation two decades later. The result crystallized in the book, Género, propiedad y empoderamiento: tierra, Estado y mercado en América Latina (English: Gender, property and empowerment: land, State and market in Latin America) (2000), a comparative study that covers twelve countries in which the authors demonstrate that gender inequality in land ownership in Latin America Latina is rooted in family, community, state, and market relations. The authors conceptually and empirically developed Nancy Fraser's theoretical proposal in the sense that comprehensive actions are required that simultaneously address both the demands related to equality and redistribution, as well as those related to differences and recognition.

In 2011, León and Deere co-author the book Land and Property Rights in Latin America, a multidisciplinary analysis of gender and property in Latin America that has served as a reference in analyzes of inequality and gender in the region. The work proposes the comparison of the situation of married women in Latin America comparing them with that of the U.S. and England at the beginning of the 19th century, demonstrating the importance of the notion of formal equality of women before the law to advance and the need to recognize the work carried out by women in the agrarian sector in order to ensure their control of productive assets, especially land ownership, which is key to reducing the poverty that especially affects them.

== Awards and honors ==
- 2003, Bryce Wood Book Award for Property, and Empowerment: Land, State, and Market in Latin America, Latin American Studies Association (LASA) (co-written with Carmen Diana Deere)

== Selected works ==
- Las clases medias y la dependencia externa en Colombia (1971)
- Leal, Magdalena León de (1977). La Mujer y el desarrollo en Colombia. Asociación Colombiana para el Estudio de la Población.
- Deere, Carmen Diana; Leal, Magdalena León de (1980). Mujer y capitalismo agrario: estudio de cuatro regiones colombianas. Asociación Colombiana para el Estudio de la Población.
- Deere, Carmen Diana; Leal, Magdalena León de (1982). Women in Andean agriculture: peasant production and rural wage employment in Colombia and Peru. International Labour Office. ISBN 9789221031062.
- Leal, Magdalena León de; Deere, Carmen Diana; Marulanda, Nohra Rey de (1982). Debate sobre la mujer en América Latina y el Caribe: Sociedad subordinación y feminismo. Asociación Colombiana para el Estudio de la Población.
- Leal, Magdalena León de; Batli, Srilatha (1997). Poder y empoderamiento de las mujeres. UN, Facultad de Ciencias Humanas. ISBN 9789586017350.
- Leal, Magdalena León de (1998). Mujer rural y desarrollo: reforma agraria y contrarreforma en el Perú : hacia un análisis de género. Ediciones Flora Tristán.
- Leal, Magdalena León de; Deere, Carmen Diana; Elizabeth García; V, Julio César Trujillo (1999). Género y derechos de las mujeres a la tierra en Ecuador. Consejo Nacional de las Mujeres.
- Leal, Magdalena León de; Feijoó, Mariá del Carmen; Sociales), Programa Latinoamericano de Investigación y Formación sobre la Mujer (Consejo Latinoamericano de Ciencias (1993). Tiempo y espacio: las luchas sociales de las mujeres latinoamericanas. CLACSO.
- Leal, Magdalena León de; Alvarez, Sonia E. (1994). Mujeres y participación política: avances y desafíos en América Latina. TM Editores. ISBN 9789586014793.
- Deere, Carmen Diana; Leal, Magdalena León de (1999). Mujer y tierra en Guatemala. AVANCSO Asociación para el Avance de Ciencias Sociales en Guatemala.
- Deere, Carmen Diana; Leal, Magdalena León de (1 de enero de 1999). Towards a gendered analysis of the Brazilian agrarian reform. Center for Latin American & Caribbean Studies, University of Connecticut.
- Deere, Carmen Diana; Leal, Magdalena León de (1997). Women and land rights in the Latin American neo-liberal counter-reforms. Women in International Development, Michigan State University.
- Deere, Carmen Diana; Leal, Magdalena León de (2001 - 2014). Empowering Women: Land and Property Rights in Latin America. University of Pittsburgh Pre. ISBN 9780822972327.
- Deere, Carmen Diana; Leal, Magdalena León de (2002). Género, propiedad y Empoderamiento: tierra, estado y mercado en América Latina. PUEG. ISBN 9789683699367.
- Leal, Magdalena León de; Baldez, Lisa (2005). Nadando contra la corriente: mujeres y cuotas políticas en los países andinos. UNIFEM.
- Leal, Magdalena León de; Sáenz, Eugenia Rodríguez (2005). Ruptura de la inequidad?: propiedad y género en la América Latina del siglo XIX. Siglo del Hombre Editores. ISBN 9789586650748.
