= Riordan Roett =

American political scientist (1938–2026)

Riordan Roett (September 10, 1938 – October 17, 2026) was an American political scientist specializing in Latin American politics, political economy, and international relations, particularly Brazil. He was the Sarita and Don Johnston Professor of Political Science at Johns Hopkins University’s Paul H. Nitze School of Advanced International Studies (SAIS), where he directed the Latin American Studies program from 1973 until his retirement in 2018. He subsequently held emeritus status.

His scholarship examined Brazilian political institutions, democratization, international debt, economic reform, and Latin America’s relations with the United States, China, and India. His books included Brazil: Politics in a Patrimonial Society, The New Brazil, and Brazil: What Everyone Needs to Know. He served as president of the Latin American Studies Association (LASA) in 1978–1979 and chaired its Emergency Committee to Aid Latin American Scholars during the 1970s.

He was a life member of the Council on Foreign Relations and a member of the Bretton Woods Committee.

== Early life, education and academic career ==
Roett was born and raised in New York City, NY. He received undergraduate, master’s, and doctoral degrees from Columbia University. His sustained engagement with Brazil began with a Fulbright fellowship in 1962. Based in Recife, he conducted research in the Brazilian Northeast and became interested in the relationship between United States development assistance and regional politics.

During his 1962–1963 Fulbright fellowship, Roett was affiliated with the Instituto Joaquim Nabuco in Recife, where he worked with its founder, sociologist Gilberto Freyre and with economist Celso Furtado, then head of the Superintendence for the Development of the Northeast (SUDENE), who urged him to examine American development assistance in the Northeast. He later described how Furtado’s advice and his observation of the expanding American aid mission shaped his dissertation research. Roett also worked closely with educator Paulo Freire before Brazil’s 1964 military coup.

Roett later credited political scientist Kalman Silvert with having a significant influence on him and other emerging Latin Americanists during the 1960s, praising Silvert’s openness and intellectual breadth.

Roett held a fellowship at the Massachusetts Institute of Technology. From 1967 to 1973, he was an assistant professor at Vanderbilt University, where he also served as acting director of the Center for Latin American Studies.

At Vanderbilt, he received the Chancellor’s Cup in 1970 and the Ellen Gregg Ingalls Award for Excellence in Classroom Teaching in 1971.

=== Detention in Brazil ===
During a research visit to Brazil in 1970, Roett was detained by security personnel in Rio de Janeiro. In a 2004 interview with historian James N. Green, he recalled being blindfolded, taken to an interrogation site, and threatened with a firearm before being released following intervention by an American diplomatic officer. His account forms part of Brown University’s oral-history collection concerning opposition to Brazil’s military dictatorship.

== Johns Hopkins SAIS ==
Roett joined SAIS in 1973 and directed its Latin American Studies program for 45 years. He also directed Western Hemisphere Studies and held the Sarita and Don Johnston Professorship of Political Science. He directed the Center of Brazilian Studies. His teaching and program leadership connected the study of Latin American politics with international finance, economic policy, and emerging markets. He twice received SAIS’s Excellence in Teaching Award.

In 2004, Johns Hopkins established the Riordan Roett Chair in Latin American Studies through a major commitment from his former student Robert J. Hildreth, supplemented by contributions from alumni and friends. Johns Hopkins Magazine reported that Hildreth committed $2 million through the Hildreth-Steward Foundation. Hildreth, a member of Roett’s first SAIS class, credited him with continuing academic and professional support after graduation.

The Riordan Roett Financial Aid Fellowship was established in 2017 in anticipation of his retirement the following year. It supports students in Latin American Studies.

Roett retired in 2018 and became professor emeritus.

Roett also taught international relations at Instituto de Empresa Business School in Madrid, and held a Fulbright appointment at Torcuato Di Tella University in Buenos Aires in 2005–2006.

== Assistance to displaced Latin American scholars ==
=== Establishment of ECALAS ===
Following the military coup in Chile on September 11, 1973, Roett led international efforts to assist academics and students subjected to political persecution under the military government of Augusto Pinochet. In October 1973, the Latin American Studies Association (LASA) established the Emergency Committee to Aid Latin American Scholars (ECALAS), appointing Roett as chairman of its steering committee.

ECALAS sought to preserve the careers of scholars whose employment, research, and academic freedom had been disrupted by military repression. Its activities included locating temporary university appointments, facilitating graduate fellowships, identifying institutional sponsors, and assisting displaced academics to leave the country and continue their research and teaching outside their countries of origin. Although initially established in response to events in Chile, the initiative formed part of a wider international effort to assist scholars threatened by political repression in Latin America.

The steering committee brought together prominent scholars and specialists, including economist Albert O. Hirschman, political scientists Richard R. Fagen and Elsa M. Chaney, economist Joseph Grunwald, sociologist Henry A. Landsberger, and Michael Potashnik of the Social Science Research Council. Bryce Wood served as executive secretary, coordinating operations from an office at New York University. ECALAS developed a network of regional coordinators and university contacts to identify academic vacancies and potential host institutions.

=== Activities in Chile and congressional testimony ===
Roett's involvement extended beyond the committee's administrative activities in the United States. On June 18, 1974, he appeared alongside Richard Fagen and political scientist John Plank before the United States House Subcommittee on Inter-American Affairs, chaired by Representative Dante Fascell. The three scholars presented testimony on the deterioration of academic freedom and conditions at Chilean universities following the military coup. Their testimony was delivered on behalf of LASA, while their subsequent policy recommendations were presented in their individual capacities.

Roett also traveled to Chile in connection with his work for ECALAS. In a March 2004 oral-history interview with historian James N. Green for Brown University, he recalled making frequent trips to Santiago in 1973 and 1974 and described witnessing repression more severe than what he had experienced during his own detention in Brazil in 1970.

In a 2021 interview with the Chilean investigative publication Interferencia, Roett recalled traveling frequently throughout Latin America during the period when he chaired ECALAS.

=== International coordination and academic placements ===
ECALAS operated within a broader network of institutions responding to the displacement of Latin American academics. Its partners included the Latin American Council of Social Sciences (CLACSO), academic associations in Canada and Europe, and philanthropic organizations providing emergency financial support. The Ford Foundation supplied substantial funding for these activities. Archival research published in 2025 identified a Ford Foundation grant of US$84,100 to LASA in 1974, alongside larger grants to CLACSO and assistance programs in Canada and the United Kingdom.

ECALAS worked with American universities to arrange academic placements for displaced scholars, obtaining placements across 32 United States campuses, benefitting 68 refugee scholars.

The difficulties surrounding the admission of Chilean refugees became a subject of discussion in the United States Congress. In 1974, the Congressional Record included an appeal supporting ECALAS and encouraging public universities to offer positions to displaced Chilean academics. The statement described the committee's activities as a response to the destruction of academic freedom in Chile and called for greater institutional assistance.

=== Notable beneficiaries ===
ECALAS's academic-placement efforts reached individuals who subsequently occupied prominent positions in Chilean public life and international academia.

Among those connected to its activities was Ricardo Lagos, who later served as President of Chile from 2000 to 2006.

The committee also assisted Chilean academic and former government official Mario Valenzuela, who had been removed from his position following the military coup, who secured an academic appointment at Bowdoin College in Maine.

Accounts of the wider international academic-rescue efforts following the Chilean coup also identify prominent displaced scholars and political figures, including Sergio Bitar and Fernando Flores, who received assistance through overlapping university and philanthropic networks.

=== Recognition and legacy ===
ECALAS's operations formed part of the international academic response to the suppression of universities and political opposition under Southern Cone military dictatorships.

Roett's involvement in assisting Chilean scholars was subsequently recognized by the government of Chile. In February 2009, he was awarded the Order of Bernardo O'Higgins at the rank of Grand Officer. Chilean ambassador Mariano Fernández, who later became the country's foreign minister, cited Roett's assistance to Chilean academics during the dictatorship when presenting the decoration.

== Scholarship ==
=== Brazil ===
His early book The Politics of Foreign Aid in the Brazilian Northeast (1972) examined American assistance and the political environment of northeastern Brazil. The book developed from his dissertation research and received reviews in journals including the American Political Science Review and The Americas.

In Brazil: Politics in a Patrimonial Society, first published in 1972 and subsequently revised through a fifth edition in 1999, Roett examined Brazilian political institutions, the relationship between state and society, military involvement in politics, economic development, and foreign policy. The fifth edition addressed the transition from military to civilian government and the social challenges confronting the democratic system. His later books extended that analysis to Brazil’s changing international position.

The New Brazil (2010) traced the country’s development from Portuguese colony to regional power, examining political and economic change and its expanding international role. Brazil: What Everyone Needs to Know (2016) provided an account of Brazilian history, politics, society, culture, and foreign relations.

=== Political economy and democratic change ===
Roett’s research also addressed the relationship between economic policy and political institutions across Latin America. With Carol Wise, he coedited Exchange Rate Politics in Latin America (2000), which compared the political foundations and consequences of exchange-rate policy in Argentina, Brazil, Mexico, and Venezuela.Their subsequent volume, Post-Stabilization Politics in Latin America: Competition, Transition, Collapse (2003), examined political responses to market reforms in Argentina, Brazil, Chile, Mexico, Peru, and Venezuela. Its contributions considered how liberalization, privatization, and deregulation interacted with electoral competition, transitions from authoritarian rule, and the breakdown of established political systems.

His work on Mexico included edited volumes on institutional reform, political and economic liberalization, the private sector, and the peso crisis. With Russell Crandall and Guadalupe Paz, he coedited Mexico’s Democracy at Work: Political and Economic Dynamics (2004) and The Andes in Focus: Security, Democracy, and Economic Reform (2005). The latter examined Bolivia, Colombia, Ecuador, Peru, and Venezuela, alongside United States policy toward the Andean region.

=== China, India, and Latin America ===
Roett’s later work examined Latin America’s expanding relationships with Asian powers. With Guadalupe Paz, he coedited China’s Expansion into the Western Hemisphere: Implications for Latin America and the United States (2008), addressing the political and economic consequences of China’s growing regional presence. Their subsequent volume, Latin America and the Asian Giants: Evolving Ties with China and India (2016), broadened the analysis to include India and examined trade, investment, diplomatic relations, and Latin America’s changing international partnerships.

== Congressional testimony and policy work ==
Roett testified before committees of the United States House of Representatives and Senate on Latin American affairs. His appearances included hearings on Brazilian debt, Latin American economic recovery, and China’s regional role.

On September 28, 1983, he appeared before the Senate Foreign Relations Committee’s Subcommittee on International Economic Policy during hearings on Brazilian debt and economic policy.

On April 29, 1992, he testified before the Joint Economic Committee on prospects for Latin American economic recovery.

On April 6, 2005, he testified before the House Subcommittee on the Western Hemisphere at its hearing on China’s influence in the region. He argued that China’s engagement was principally economic and diplomatic and that Chinese trade could contribute to Latin American growth. He also advocated a more active United States response to the region’s economic needs.

On March 10, 2010, he appeared before the same subcommittee at its hearing, U.S. Policy Toward the Americas in 2010 and Beyond. He urged policymakers to consider Latin America’s increasingly diverse political systems and international relationships within a broader global context.

Roett participated in Council on Foreign Relations task forces on Brazil, including the group responsible for Global Brazil and U.S.–Brazil Relations in 2011. He consulted for the Office of the Director of National Intelligence.

Roett was also a faculty fellow of the World Economic Forum and participated in its annual meetings in Davos.

== Financial-sector work ==
Roett served as a consultant to Chase Manhattan Bank, where he was a senior political analyst in the Emerging Markets Division of its International Capital Markets Group. His work concerned political analysis of emerging markets.

Beginning in the 1990s, Roett served as an independent director of registered investment funds that later formed part of the Legg Mason and Western Asset fund complexes.

== Honors and recognition ==
Roett received Brazil’s Order of Rio Branco at the rank of Commander in December 2000.

Chile awarded him the Order of Bernardo O’Higgins at the rank of Grand Officer in 2009.

His university honors included Vanderbilt’s Chancellor’s Cup and Ellen Gregg Ingalls teaching award, two SAIS Excellence in Teaching Awards, and the establishment of the Riordan Roett Chair in Latin American Studies. The fellowship established in his name in 2017 continued his association with the training of Latin American specialists.

== Selected publications ==
=== Authored and coauthored books ===
- The Politics of Foreign Aid in the Brazilian Northeast. Vanderbilt University Press, 1972.
- Brazil: Politics in a Patrimonial Society. First published 1972; fifth edition, Praeger, 1999.
- Paraguay: The Personalist Legacy, with Richard S. Sacks. Westview Press, 1991.
- The New Brazil. Brookings Institution Press, 2010.
- Brazil: What Everyone Needs to Know. Oxford University Press, 2016.

=== Edited and coedited volumes ===
- Brazil in the Sixties. Vanderbilt University Press, 1972.
- Brazil in the Seventies. American Enterprise Institute, 1976.
- Mexico and the United States: Managing the Relationship. Westview Press, 1988.
- Political and Economic Liberalization in Mexico: At a Critical Juncture? Lynne Rienner, 1993.
- The Challenge of Institutional Reform in Mexico. Lynne Rienner, 1995.
- The Mexican Peso Crisis: International Perspectives. Lynne Rienner, 1996.
- Brazil Under Cardoso, with Susan Kaufman Purcell. Lynne Rienner, 1997.
- Mexico’s Private Sector: Recent History, Future Challenges. Lynne Rienner, 1998.
- Mercosur: Regional Integration, World Markets. Lynne Rienner, 1999.
- Exchange Rate Politics in Latin America, with Carol Wise. Brookings Institution Press, 2000.
- Post-Stabilization Politics in Latin America: Competition, Transition, Collapse, with Carol Wise. Brookings Institution Press, 2003.
- Latin America in a Changing Global Environment, with Guadalupe Paz. Lynne Rienner, 2003.
- Mexico’s Democracy at Work: Political and Economic Dynamics, with Russell Crandall and Guadalupe Paz. Lynne Rienner, 2004.
- The Andes in Focus: Security, Democracy, and Economic Reform, with Russell Crandall and Guadalupe Paz. Lynne Rienner, 2005.
- China’s Expansion into the Western Hemisphere: Implications for Latin America and the United States, with Guadalupe Paz. Brookings Institution Press, 2008.
- Latin America and the Asian Giants: Evolving Ties with China and India, with Guadalupe Paz. Brookings Institution Press, 2016.

== Notable Students ==
- Roberto Álvarez, the Dominican Republic's minister of foreign affairs from 2020, previously served as ambassador to the Organization of American States from 2005 to 2008 and worked on human rights through the Inter-American Commission on Human Rights. He studied at SAIS and worked in its Latin American department during Roett's directorship.
- Cynthia J. Arnson, former director of the Wilson Center's Latin America Program and author of works on Central American politics and peace processes, received graduate degrees at SAIS and collaborated with Roett on Enter the Dragon? China's Presence in Latin America.
- Enrique Berruga, Mexico's permanent representative to the United Nations from 2003 to 2007, received a master's degree from Johns Hopkins and studied at SAIS during Roett's directorship.
- Todd Greentree, a former American diplomat who served in several conflict zones including El Salvador and Afghanistan, subsequently taught strategy and policy at the Naval War College and became a researcher of irregular warfare. He studied Latin American Studies at SAIS from 1978 to 1980.
- Amparo Menéndez-Carrión, a Uruguayan-Ecuadorian political scientist, former Director of FLACSO, and author of La conquista del voto: de Velasco a Roldós (1986). Obtained an MA and Ph.D at SAIS, where she conducted doctoral research under Roett's advisement and coauthored a study of authoritarian rule in Paraguay with him.
- Roberto Russell, an Argentine political scientist and former director of academic affairs at Argentina's diplomatic academy, the Instituto del Servicio Exterior de la Nación, also directed the master's program in international studies at Torcuato Di Tella University, where he became professor emeritus in 2025. He earned his doctorate at SAIS and contributed to Latin America in a Changing Global Environment, edited by Roett and Guadalupe Paz.
- Arturo Sarukhán, Mexico's ambassador to the United States from 2007 to 2013, previously served as consul general in New York and chief of policy planning at Mexico's foreign ministry. He received a master's degree from SAIS during Roett's tenure.
- Isabel Studer, a Mexican scholar and official who served in Mexico's foreign affairs and environment ministries and as director general for cooperation and international economic relations at its development-cooperation agency, founded the Global Institute for Sustainability at Tecnológico de Monterrey. She earned a master's and doctorate at SAIS during Roett's directorship.
- Julia E. Sweig, an author and former senior fellow at the Council on Foreign Relations, won the Herbert Feis Award in 2003 for Inside the Cuban Revolution and later published Lady Bird Johnson: Hiding in Plain Sight. She received her doctorate at SAIS and acknowledged Roett in her work.
- Juan Gabriel Tokatlian, an Argentine scholar of foreign policy, international security, and drug trafficking, co-founded the Center for International Studies at the University of the Andes in Colombia and served as vice-rector of Torcuato Di Tella University from 2019 to 2023, becoming professor emeritus in 2026. He received his master's degree (1981) and doctorate (1990) at SAIS during Roett's directorship.
- Mariano Turzi, an Argentine political scientist who teaches at Universidad Austral and UCEMA, received his doctorate from SAIS in 2010 under Roett's supervision. His research includes the political economy of soybean production in Argentina, Brazil, and Paraguay, examined in The Political Economy of Agricultural Booms (2017).
