= The World of Lucha Libre =

Book by Heather Levi

- Cover, The World of Lucha Libre
- Author: Heather Levi
- Cover artist: Sergio Arau
- Language: English
- Series: American Encounters/Global Interactions
- Genre: Book
- Publisher: Duke University Press
- Publication date: October 3, 2008
- Publication place: United States
- Media type: Print
- Pages: 288
- ISBN: 978-0-8223-4214-4
- OCLC: 226361814

The World of Lucha Libre: Secrets, Revelations, and Mexican National Identity is a book, published in 2008, by Heather Levi. The book is an account of lucha libre, a term used in Mexico for a form of professional wrestling.

== Synopsis ==
From Levi's perspective of the inner workings of lucha libre, Levi observes this form of wrestling as a cultural performance, an occupational subculture, and a set of symbols that circulate through Mexican culture and politics. Additionally, Levi “argues that lucha libre stages the contradictions at the heart of Mexican national identity,” which include “the rural and the urban, tradition and modernity, ritual and parody, machismo and feminism, politics and spectacle.” The World of Lucha Libre is split into six chapters, described below.

=== Chapter 1: Staging Contradiction ===
Levi begins with an introductory chapter emphasizing lucha libre to be a practice of staging contradictions. In this section, Levi argues that lucha libre “occupies a space somewhere between sport, ritual, and theater and is thus capable of drawing its power from all of those genres.” The chapter offers a simple view of lucha libre; two or more wrestlers enter a boxing ring to put on a fighting show that ends only when one of them is pinned down or surrenders. Levi, however, expands lucha libre to be a “complex performance that integrates a range of ideas about agency, power, modernity, gender, and national culture.”

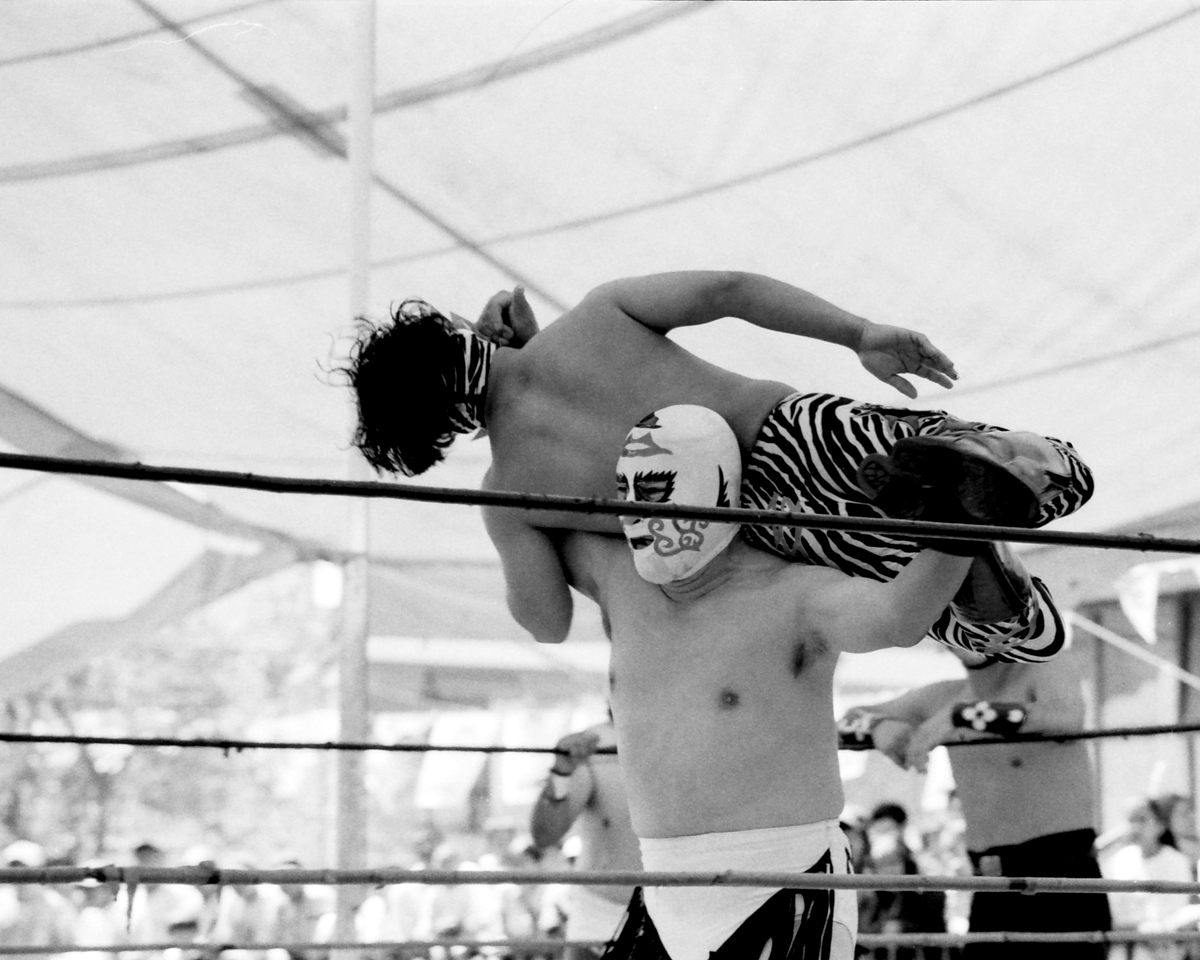
live match

=== Chapter 2: Trade Secrets and Revelations ===
In this chapter, Levi explains that by immersing herself in the practice of lucha libre the secrecy of how a luchador is made was revealed to her. In this section she observes that everyone seems to know that outcomes of lucha libre matches are predetermined, yet emphasizes a secretive element that is said to be unplanned. In her practice as a luchadora, she continues the discussion of lucha libre being fixed, while expressing that she felt the wrestling was real. In the end of the chapter, Levi explains that “secrecy itself is a structuring feature of lucha libre,” and concluded that it is not the secrets, but the secrecy itself that is important in the sport.

=== Chapter 3: Of Charros and Jaguars: The Moral and Social Cosmos of Lucha Libre ===
This chapter looks at the perspectives of lucha libre as both an athletic sport and as a spectacle of good vs. evil, or tecnicos (good guys) vs. rudos (bad guys). Levi addresses that lucha libre is a complex cultural performance consisting of three levels: the life world, the performance, and the played out "socially marked characters." The chapter proceeds to discuss the life of lucha libre within the context of the body and self-representation of a luchador/a. The aspects of the performance involve play-roles that range from socially marked characters to animals (e.g. jaguars) and elemental forces (Tinieblas or Darkness), but also mass media cultural images, such as El Zorro.

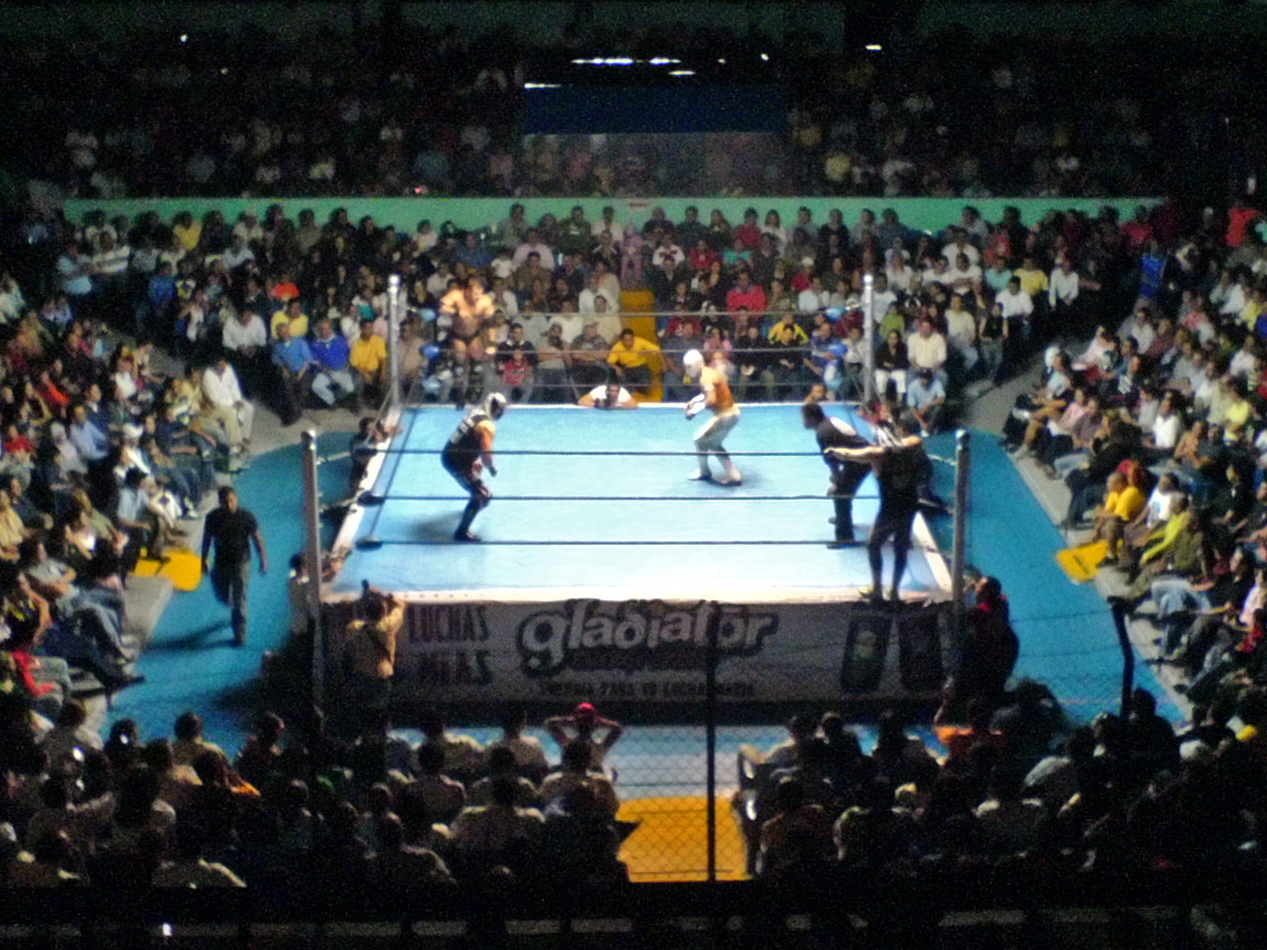
Lucha libre ring

=== Chapter 4: The Wrestling Mask ===
In this chapter Levi presents the mask as a national culture embodiment and contributor to the idea of culture and nation. The mask, Levi explains, offers a liberty for the luchador/a to “embody a critical role” of empowerment. Without the mask the luchador/a would be unable to “convert to a national or regional” symbol. The empowerment of the mask reflects a “political theater” for the social wrestler, termed the “lucha social”. The idea is that the social wrestler acts as an agency for a lucha, or struggle within Mexican politics, in secrecy, and behind a hidden mask.

=== Chapter 5: A Struggle Between Two Strong Men? ===
This chapter discusses machismo and “marianismo” as forms of gendered representation that are contested in the ring. Levi critiques the idea of traditional roles that depict “ a romantic notion of the macho as the real, earthly Mexican, indifferent to risk, indifferent to death.” In lucha libre male representation is extended to homosexuality, and women fought for acceptance as "luchadoras." The chapter discusses one distinction between Mexican professional wrestling and wrestling in the U.S.; females are less sexualized and are more often regarded as professional athletes.

=== Chapter 6: Mediating the Mask: Lucha Libre and Circulation ===
In this chapter Levi addresses what it means for "professional wrestling to be vulgarized" as a televised sport. Televised matches were short lived after they reached the courts and were banned to protect underaged viewers. Levi implies that there may have been other reasons for the banning, but the ban expanded luche libre into cinema. Once luche libre reentered the televised spectrum it entered a popular tradition that conflicted with "neoliberal economics or cultural authenticity" and opposed the once vulgar and corrupt aspects luche libre had among a less mass audience.

== Publication ==
Duke University Press published The World of Lucha Libre in October 2008 as part of the American Encounters/Global Interactions series, edited by Gilbert M. Joseph and Penny Von Eschen. The book is available in Kindle, hardback and paperback formats.
