= Charles Hales =

Charles Hales may refer to:

- Charlie Hales (born 1956), American politician, mayor of Portland, Oregon
- Charles Nicholas Hales (1935–2005), English physician, biochemist, diabetologist and pathologist

== See also ==
- Charles Hale (disambiguation)
