= Charles Hale (disambiguation) =

Charles Hale (1831–1882) was an American legislator and diplomat.

Charles Hale may also refer to:

- Charles A. Hale (1930–2008), American historian
- Charles R. Hale (bishop) (1837–1900), American Anglican bishop
- Charles R. Hale (anthropologist) (born 1957), scholar and academic

== See also ==
- Charles Hales (disambiguation)
