= Forrest Hylton =

American historian

Forrest Hylton (Ph.D., New York University) is an ethnohistorian of Latin America and the Caribbean and Visiting Professor of History in the graduate school at the Universidade Federal da Bahia (UFBA). He has also taught at the Universidad de los Andes (Bogotá), Harvard University, Northwestern University, and the Universidad Nacional de Colombia-Medellín. He has been a Postdoctoral Fellow at New York University's Tamiment Library, a Faculty Fellow at the Charles Warren Center for American History at Harvard University, and a Guest Researcher at Linnaeus University (Växjö, Sweden).

He has also been a member of the Junta Directiva of the Asociación Sindical de Profesores Universitarios-Medellín (ASPU), a participant in the Grupo de Investigación en Historia Social (GIHS), and in Salvador, is currently a member of the research group 'Escravidão e a Invenção da Liberdade'. He has participated actively in the Latin American Studies Association in various roles, and writes about Latin American and Caribbean politics for the London Review of Books; he has also written for NACLA Report on the Americas, Jacobin, CounterPunch, Against the Current, Left Turn, Pulso, Nueva Sociedad, and Universo Centro.

== Books ==
Hylton is the author of Evil Hour in Colombia, which has been translated into Spanish, French, and Portuguese. With Sinclair Thomson, he is co-author of Revolutionary Horizons: Past and Present in Bolivian Politics, which has been translated into French. With Thomson, he is an editor of and contributor to Ya es otro tiempo el presente: Cuatro momentos de insurgencia indígena (La Paz: Muela del Diablo, 2003), in its third printing in Bolivia.

== Research ==
Allegedly, Hylton is completing a book manuscript entitled Ghosts of Race War: Indian Communities, the Federal War of 1899, and the Regeneration of Bolivia, and working on a monographic project entitled Atlantic Homeland: Trade, Law, and Authority in the Guajira (New Granada), 1696-1831. He has completed archival research for a book to be entitled Labor Noir: Democracy and Organized Crime on the Brooklyn Waterfront, 1919-1982, under contract with Oxford University Press.

Hylton has recently published essays on indigenous peasant politics in Bolivia in the nineteenth, twentieth, and twenty-first centuries. He is the author of an essay on indigenous historicities in the Americas and the ethical and epistemological limits of history as an academic discipline, and an essay on the history of silver and gold mining in colonial Spanish America, 1500-1810, is forthcoming.

In 2022, with Miguel Durango, he has published an essay on the 1799 conspiracy in Maracaibo in Mundos do Trabalho; with Aaron Tauss, an essay on Colombia in New Left Review; and with Tauss and Alcides Gómez, an essay on Medellín in Le Monde Diplomatique. An essay on democracy, labor, and organized crime on the Brooklyn waterfront, entitled "Labor Noir," will be published in winter 2023 in Spectre: A Marxist Journal.

His academic and political publications are available for download at: academia.edu

== Documentary Films ==
With Lina Britto (Northwestern University), Hylton is co-author and co-producer of a documentary, Espíritus Guerreros: Las huellas de las luchas Wayúu del siglo XVIII (2012/14, 35 mins., Spanish and Wayuunaiki, Universidad de los Andes/Northwestern University), about historical memory of Spanish colonization projects in the Guajira peninsula in the Age of Revolution.

== Fiction ==
Hylton's first novel, Vanishing Acts: A Tragedy, is bi-lingual, and was published by City Works Press (San Diego) in 2010. His short fiction, translations, and excerpts from a novel in progress, entitled Isolate Flecks, have appeared in the Brooklyn Rail. Excerpts from another novel in progress, El caso Padilla, have been published in Arte y Parte (Riohacha, Colombia).

== Poetry ==
Hylton is at work on an autobiographical long poem entitled Lost Causes, as well as Split the Difference, a collection of short lyrics. He follows the poetics of Louis Zukovsky and Basil Bunting a la letra, con muchísima música, so far with mixed results.
