= Arturo Arias (writer) =

Guatemalan novelist and critic (born 1950)

- Born: 1950 (age 75–76); Guatemala City, Guatemala
- Education: L'Ecole des Hautes Etudes Paris, France
- Occupations: novelist and critic
- Writing career
- Genre: Novels
- Notable awards: Guggenheim Fellowship, Anna Seghers Prize, Academy Award nomination

Arturo Arias (born 1950) is a Guatemalan novelist and critic. His early life was marked by the overthrow of democracy in 1954, and the ensuing military dictatorships and civil rebellions. These experiences, along with a visit to refugee camps on the Guatemala-Mexico border in 1982, sparked his dedication to peoples and Indigenous rights and inspired his scholarly research.

== Career ==
Arias is a John D. and Catherine T. MacArthur professor of 20th-century Spanish-American Literature at the University of California, Merced. He has taught courses specializing in: Central American literature; Indigenous literatures; social and critical theory; race, gender and sexuality in post-colonial societies; cultural studies, and ethnographic approaches. Arias previously taught at San Francisco State University, the University of Redlands in Southern California, and the University of Texas at Austin, where he was the Tomás Rivera Regents Professor in Spanish Language and Literature. He is a past president of the Latin American Studies Association. He holds a PhD in Sociology of Literature, from L'Ecole des Hautes Etudes Paris, France. (1978)

Arias has held several prestigious fellowships—the Guggenheim (John Simon Guggenheim Memorial Foundation), the Hood (University of Auckland) and the Martha Sutton Weeks (Stanford Humanities Center)--as well as distinguished visiting posts at Princeton, Tulane, and the University of Oregon.

Arias has published numerous novels, as well as scholarly books and journal articles, in English and Spanish. He received the Casa de las Américas Prize for his novel Itzam Na (1981), the Anna Seghers award for his novel Jaguar en llamas (1990), and the Casa de las Américas prize in essay for his book Ideología, Literatura y Sociedad durante la Revolución Guatemalteca, 1944-1954 (1979). In 2008, he was honored with the Miguel Angel Asturias National Award for Lifetime Achievement in Literature in his native Guatemala.

His books in English include Recovering Lost Footprints: Contemporary Maya Narratives. Volumes 1 and 2, The Rigoberta Menchú Controversy, Taking their Word: Literature and the Signs of Central America, After the Bombs, and Rattlesnake.

== Works of Fiction in Spanish ==
=== Short Stories ===
- En la ciudad y en las montañas. Guatemala City: Impresos industriales, 1975.

=== Novels ===
- Después de las bombas. Guatemala City: F&G Editores, 1979.
- Itzam Na. Havana: Casa de las Américas, 1981.
- Jaguar en llamas: Guatemala City: Editorial Cultura, Ministerio de Cultura y Deportes,1989.
- Los caminos de Paxil. Guatemala City: Editorial Cultura, Ministerio de Cultura y Deportes, 1991.
- Cascabel. Guatemala City: Artemis & Edinter, 1998.
- Sopa de caracol. Guatemala City: Santillana, 2002.
- Arias de don Giovanni. Guatemala City: F&G Editores, 2010.
- El precio del consuelo. Guatemala City: F&G Editores, 2017.

== List of works in English ==
=== Novels translated into English ===
- Arias, Arturo (1990), After the Bombs, Willimantic, CT: Curbstone, ISBN 978-0-915306-88-6. Trans. Asa Zatz.
- Arias, Arturo (2003), Rattlesnake, Willimantic, CT: Curbstone Press ISBN 978-1-931896-01-6 Trans. Sean Higgins and Jill Robbins. (spy thriller)

=== Scholarly books in English. ===
- Arias, Arturo (2001), The Rigoberta Menchú Controversy, Minneapolis: University of Minnesota Press, ISBN 978-0-8166-3626-6.
- Arias, Arturo (2007), Taking their Word: Literature and the Signs of Central America, Minneapolis: University of Minnesota Press, ISBN 978-0-8166-4849-8
- Arias, Arturo (2018). Recovering Lost Footprints: Contemporary Maya Narratives. Volumes 1 and 2. SUNY Press.

== Awards ==
- Anna Seghers Prize 1990 for his novel Jaguar en llamas
- Academy Award Nomination 1985 for Best Original Screenplay (El Norte); co-writer
- Casa de las Américas Prize 1981 for his novel Itzam-Na
- Casa de las Américas Prize 1979 for his essay Ideologías, literatura y sociedad durante la revolución guatemalteca 1944-1954
- Miguel Angel Asturias National Award for Lifetime Achievement in Literature 2008
- Guggenheim Fellowship 2020
