= Cynthia McClintock =

Cynthia McClintock is a professor at George Washington University and an author. She serves on the Center for International Policy's board of directors. From 1994–1995 she was the president of the Latin American Studies Association. She is an expert on Peruvian relations with the U.S., Andean affairs, the drug trade, and the Tupac Amaru rebel group.

McClintock grew up in New York City, where she graduated from the Chapin School. She received a B.A. in English from Harvard University (1967), M.A. (1968) Political Science, University of California at Los Angeles and a Ph.D. from Massachusetts Institute of Technology (1976) Political Science.

Her expertise is in Latin American politics, U.S. policy towards Latin America, and Peru. She was a member of the Council of the American Political Science Association from 1998–2000 and served as chair of its Comparative Democratization Section. She was a fellow at the Woodrow Wilson School of Public and International Affairs from 2003–2005.

She has received fellowships from the U.S. Institute of Peace, Fulbright, Social Science Research Council and the Woodrow Wilson International Center for Scholars. She has testified before the Subcommittee on Western Hemisphere Affairs of the U.S. House of Representatives and has appeared on News Hour with Jim Lehrer, CNN International, CNN Spanish, National Public Radio, and the Diane Rehm Show.

== Bibliography ==
- The United States and Peru: Cooperation – at a Cost. Co-author: Fabián Vallas. Routledge, 2003. Spanish edition: Instituto de Estudios Peruanos, 2005
- Revolutionary Movements in Latin America: El Salvador's FMLN and Peru's Shining Path U.S. Institute of Peace Press, 1998
- Peasant Cooperatives and Political Change in Peru. Princeton University Press, 1981
- The Peruvian Experiment Reconsidered. Co-author: Abraham F. Lowenthal. Princeton University Press, 1983. Spanish edition: Instituto de Estudios Peruanos, 1985
