= Gilbert Joseph =

American academic

Gilbert M. Joseph
- Born: 1947/10/24
- Education: Colgate University Yale University
- Notable work: The Mexico Reader: History, Culture, Politics

Gilbert M. Joseph is an American scholar and writer. He received his doctorate from Yale University in Latin American history in 1978, where he is presently a Farnam Professor Emeritus of History and International Studies. He has been the recipient of numerous awards, including the Sturgis Leavitt Best Article Prize (1981,1987), the Tanner Award for Inspirational Teaching of Undergraduates at the University of North Carolina, Chapel Hill (1980), and the Harwood F.Byrnes/Richard B. Sewall Prize for Teaching Excellence at Yale University (2017). Joseph presided over the Latin American Studies Association (LASA) from 2015 to 2016.

Joseph specializes in Modern Latin American history, particularly Mexico and Central America, and in US-Latin American relations. He is the author of numerous academic works including books, chapters, book reviews, and articles, in his fields of research.

== Biography ==
Gilbert Joseph was born in Boston, Massachusetts, in 1947. He received his B.A. in 1969, with a major in History, from Colgate University, where he graduated as Class Valedictorian and Summa Cum Laude.

In 1969–1970, he was a Fulbright Scholar in History at Monash University in Australia. He received his M.A. (1972) and M.Phil (1974), before being awarded the doctorate from Yale in 1978, the year he became an assistant professor in Latin American history at the University of North Carolina at Chapel Hill.

In 1993, after fifteen years on the faculty in Chapel Hill, he returned to Yale as a full professor; in 1999 he became the Farnam Professor of History and International Studies, a position he held until July 2021, when he became the Farnam Professor Emeritus. In 2005 he finished an eleven-year term as director of Latin American and Iberian Studies. During 2015–2016 he served as president of the Latin American Studies Association (LASA). He presided over LASA's Fiftieth Anniversary Congress in New York City in 2016, and was a member of LASA's Executive Council and Strategic Oversight Committee from 2014 to 2020.

Joseph edited the Hispanic American Historical Review (with Stuart Schwartz) from 1997 to 2002, and has served on the editorial boards of historical journals in the U.S., Mexico, Venezuela, and the U.K. He also co-edits (with Penny Von Eschen) the long-running book series "American Encounters/Global Interactions" for Duke University Press, which aims to stimulate critical perspectives and fresh interpretive frameworks for scholarship on the imposing global presence of the United States and has published 70 titles since its inception in 1998.

To date, he has directed 55 PhD students (46 graduated from Yale, 9 from UNC-Chapel Hill). Joseph won Yale's inaugural Graduate Mentor Award in the Humanities in 2000 and the Geoffrey Marshall Faculty Mentoring Award, bestowed by the Northeastern Association of Graduate Schools, in 2002.

== Writings ==
=== Books ===
- Joseph, G. M. (1982). Revolution from Without: Yucatán, Mexico, and the United States, 1880-1924. Cambridge University Press. ISBN 978-0-521-23516-7.
- Joseph, Gilbert M. (2015). Rediscovering The Past at Mexico's Periphery: Essays on the History of Modern Yucatan. The University of Alabama Press. ISBN 978-0-8173-8984-0. Project MUSE 43125.
- Wells, Allen; Joseph, Gilbert M. (1992). "Modernizing Visions, 'Chilango' Blueprints, and Provincial Growing Pains: Mérida at the Turn of the Century". Mexican Studies/Estudios Mexicanos. 8 (2): 167–215. doi:10.2307/1051855. JSTOR 1051855.
- Brannon, Jeffrey T.; Joseph, Gilbert M. (1991). Land, Labor and Capital in Modern Yucatan: Essays in Regional History and Political Economy. Books on Demand. ISBN 978-0-608-05126-0.
- Joseph, Gilbert Michael; Nugent, Daniel (1994). Everyday Forms of State Formation: Revolution and the Negotiation of Rule in Modern Mexico. Duke University Press. ISBN 978-0-8223-1467-7.
- Joseph, Gilbert Michael; Szuchman, Mark D. (1996). I Saw a City Invincible: Urban Portraits of Latin America. Rowman & Littlefield. ISBN 978-0-8420-2496-9.
- Wells, Allen; Joseph, Gilbert M. (1997). Summer of Discontent, Seasons of Upheaval: Elite Politics and Rural Insurgency in Yucatán, 1876–1915. Stanford: Stanford University Press. ISBN 978-0-8047-2656-6.
- Joseph, Gilbert M.; Legrand, Catherine C.; Salvatore, Ricardo D., eds. (2020). Close Encounters of Empire. doi:10.1515/9780822396352. ISBN 9780822396352. S2CID 241600081.
- Deans-Smith, Susan; Joseph, Gilbert M. (1999). "The Arena of Dispute". The Hispanic American Historical Review. 79 (2): 203–209. doi:10.1215/00182168-79.2.203. JSTOR 2518372.
- Espejo, Ramón; Guijarro, Juan I.; Marín, Pilar (2007). Critical Essays on Chicano Studies. Peter Lang. ISBN 978-3-03911-281-4.
- with Carlos Aguirre and Ricardo D. Salvatore (eds.), Crime and Punishment in Latin America: Law and Society since Late Colonial Times. Durham and London: Duke University Press, 2001.
- (ed.), Reclaiming the Political in Latin American History: Essays from the North. Durham and London: Duke University Press, 2001.
- Joseph, G. M. (2001). "A Historiographical Revolution in Our Time". Hispanic American Historical Review. 81 (3): 445–447. doi:10.1215/00182168-81-3-4-445. S2CID 145154805. Project MUSE 12617.
- with Timothy J. Henderson (eds.), The Mexico Reader: History, Culture, Politics. Durham and London: Duke University Press, 2002.
- with Daniela Spenser (eds.), In from the Cold: Latin America’s New Encounter with the Cold War. Durham and London: Duke University Press, 2008.
- with Greg Grandin (eds.), A Century of Revolution: Insurgent and Counterinsurgent Violence during Latin America’s Long Cold War. Durham and London: Duke University Press, 2010.
- with Edward Terry, Ben Fallaw, and Edward Moseley (eds.), Peripheral Visions: Politics, Society, and the Challenges of Modernity in Yucatán. University, Alabama: University of Alabama Press, 2010.
- with Jürgen Buchenau. Mexico's Once and Future Revolution: Social Upheaval and the Challenge of Rule since the Late Nineteenth Century. Durham and London: Duke University Press 2013.
- with Peter Winn (eds.), Latin America: Fifty Years of Transformation, 2017.

=== Articles and book chapters ===
- Joseph, Gilbert M. (1976). "British Loggers and Spanish Governors: The Logwood Trade and Its Settlements in the Yucatan Peninsula: Part II". Caribbean Studies. 15 (4): 43–52. JSTOR 25612722.
- "The Origins of Modern Belize: The Logwood Trade and Its Settlements in the Yucatán Peninsula" Caribbean Studies 15, no. 4 (January 1976): 43–52.
- "Apuntes hacia una nueva historia regional: Yucatán y la Revolución Mexicana, 1915-1940" Revista de la Universidad de Yucatán 19 no. 109 (January–February 1977): 12-55.
- Joseph, Gilbert M. (1979). "Mexico's 'Popular Revolution': Mobilization and Myth in Yucatan, 1910-1940". Latin American Perspectives. 6 (3): 46–65. doi:10.1177/0094582X7900600304. JSTOR 2633399. S2CID 144671526.
- "Caciquismo and the Revolution: Carrillo Puerto in Yucatán" In D. A. Brading, ed., Caudillo and Peasant in the Mexican Revolution. Cambridge: Cambridge University Press, 1980), pp. 193–221.
- "Revolution from Without: The Mexican Revolution in Yucatán, 1910-1940" In Edward H. Moseley, ed., Yucatán: A World Apart. University, Alabama: University of Alabama Press, 1980, pp. 142–171.
- "The Fragile Revolution: Cacique Politics and Revolutionary Process in Yucatán." Latin American Research Review 15, no. 1 (1980): 39-64.
- Joseph, Gilbert M. (January 1, 1980). "John Coxon and the Role of Buccaneering in the Settlement of the Yucatán Colonial Frontier". Terrae Incognitae. 12 (1): 65–84. doi:10.1179/tin.1980.12.1.65.
- with Allen Wells, "Corporate Control of a Monocrop Economy: International Harvester and Yucatán's Henequen Industry during the Porfiriato" Latin American Research Review 17, no. 1 (1982): 69-99.
- Joseph, Gilbert M. (1985). "From Caste War to Class War: The Historiography of Modern Yucatán (c. 1750-1940)". The Hispanic American Historical Review. 65 (1): 111–134. doi:10.2307/2514672. JSTOR 2514672.
- Joseph, Gilbert M.; Wells, Allen (November 1986). "Summer of Discontent: Economic Rivalry among Elite Factions during the Late Porfiriato in Yucatán". Journal of Latin American Studies. 18 (2): 255–282. doi:10.1017/S0022216X00012025. S2CID 143836681.
- with Allen Wells, "The Rough and Tumble Career of Pedro Crespo" In William Beezley and Judith Ewell, eds., The Human Tradition in Latin America: The Twentieth Century. Wilmington, Delaware: Scholarly Resources, 1987, pp. 27–40.
- "Documenting a Regional Pastime: Baseball in Yucatán" In Robert M. Levine, ed., Windows on Latin America: Understanding Society through Photographs. Coral Gables: University of Miami North-South Center, 1987, pp. 76–89.
- "The United States, Feuding Elites, and Rural Revolt in Yucatán, 1836–1915" In Daniel Nugent, ed., Rural Revolt and United States Intervention in Mexico. San Diego: Center for U.S.-Mexican Studies, 1988, pp. 167–197.
- with Allen Wells, "El monocultivo henequenero y sus contradicciones: Estructura de dominación y formas de resistencia en las haciendas yucatecas a fines del Porfiriato" Siglo XIX 6 (julio-diciembre 1988): 215-277.
- with Allen Wells, "Yucatán: Elite Politics and Rural Insurgency" In Thomas Benjamin and Mark Wasserman, eds., Provinces of the Revolution: Essays on Regional Mexican History, 1910-1929. Albuquerque: University of New Mexico Press, 1990, pp. 93–131.
- with Allen Wells, "Verano de descontento, estaciones de sublevación: Hacia un análisis de la política de las élites y la rebelión rural en Yucatán, 1890-1915" In Othón Baños Ramírez, ed., Sociedad, estructura agraria y estado en Yucatán. Mérida: Universidad Autónoma de Yucatán, 1990, pp. 233–256.
- Joseph, Gilbert M. (1990). "On the Trail of Latin American Bandits: A Reexamination of Peasant Resistance". Latin American Research Review. 25 (3): 7–53. doi:10.1017/S0023879100023554. JSTOR 2503816. S2CID 142990626.
- with Allen Wells, "Seasons of Upheaval: The Crisis of Oligarchical Rule in Yucatán, 1909-1915" In Jaime E. Rodríguez O., ed., The Revolutionary Process in Mexico: Essays on Political and Social Change, 1880–1940. Los Angeles: UCLA Latin American Center Publications, 1990, pp. 161–185.
- "The New Regional Historiography at Mexico's Periphery" In Joseph and Brannon, eds., Land, Labor, and Capital in Modern Yucatán, pp. 1–9.
- Wells, Allen; Joseph, Gilbert M. (1992). "Modernizing Visions, "Chilango" Blueprints, and Provincial Growing Pains: Mérida at the Turn of the Century". Mexican Studies/Estudios Mexicanos. 8 (2): 167–215. doi:10.2307/1051855. JSTOR 1051855.
- with Allen Wells, "Henequen Monoculture and its Contradictions: Structure of Domination and Forms of Resistance on Yucatecan Estates during the Late Porfiriato" In Edward D. Beechert, Brij V. Lal, and Doug Munro, eds., Resistance and Accommodation on Plantations. Honolulu: University of Hawaii Press, 1993, pp. 241–296.
- Joseph, Gilbert M.; Nugent, Daniel (1994). "Popular Culture and State Formation in Revolutionary Mexico". Everyday Forms of State Formation. pp. 3–23. doi:10.1215/9780822396666-001. ISBN 978-0-8223-1452-3. S2CID 191883878.
- "Rethinking Mexican Revolutionary Mobilization: Yucatán's Seasons of Upheaval, 1909-1915." In Joseph and Nugent, eds., Everyday Forms of State Formation, pp. 135–169.
- "Un replanteamiento de la movilización revolucionaria mexicana: Los tiempos de sublevación en Yucatán, 1909-1915." Historia Mexicana, 43, no. 171 (enero-marzo 1994): 505-546.
- "La nueva historiografía regional de México: Una evaluación preliminar" In Pablo Serrano Alvarez, ed., Pasado, presente y futuro de la historiografía regional de México. México: UNAM, 1999, Chap. 62.
- "De guerra de castas a lucha de clases: La historiografía del Yucatán moderno (c. 1750-1940)" In Serrano Alvarez, ed., Pasado, presente y futuro, Chap. 36.
- with Allen Wells, "Clientelism and the Political Baptism of Yucatán's Working Classes, 1880–1929." In Will G. Pansters, ed., Citizens of the Pyramid: Essays on Mexican Political Culture. Amsterdam: Thela Publishers, 1997, pp. 66–106.
- "Close Encounters: Towards a New Cultural History of U.S.-Latin American Relations" In Joseph, LeGrand, and Salvatore, eds., Close Encounters of Empire, pp. 3–46.
- "La última batalla del orden oligárquico. La resistencia popular y de las élites durante el 'Porfiriato prolongado' de Yucatán (1910-1915)" In Romana Falcón and Raymond Buve, eds., Don Porfirio presidente..., nunca omnipotente. Mexico City: Universidad Iberoamericana, 1998, pp. 407–452.
- Joseph, Gilbert M. (1999). Vanderwood, Paul (ed.). "The Challenge of Writing Narrative Cultural History". Mexican Studies/Estudios Mexicanos. 15 (2): 359–371. doi:10.2307/1052149. JSTOR 1052149.
- Joseph, Gilbert M.; Rubenstein, Anne; Zolov, Eric (2020). "Assembling the Fragments:Writing a Cultural History of Mexico Since 1940". Fragments of a Golden Age. pp. 1–22. doi:10.1515/9780822383123-004. ISBN 9780822383123. S2CID 241916957.
- "Reclaiming ‘the Political’ at the Turn of the Millennium." In Joseph, ed., Reclaiming "the Political" in Latin American History, pp. 3–16.
- Joseph, Gilbert M. (2020). "What We Now Know and Should Know: Bringing Latin America More Meaningfully into Cold War Studies". In from the Cold. pp. 1–46. doi:10.1515/9780822390664-002. ISBN 9780822390664.
- Joseph, Gilbert M. (2020). "Latin America's Long Cold War". A Century of Revolution. pp. 397–414. doi:10.1515/9780822392859-015. ISBN 9780822392859. S2CID 243595486.
- Joseph, Gilbert M. (2014). "Some Final Thoughts on Regional History and the Encounter with Modernity at Mexico's Periphery". In Terry, Edward D.; Fallaw, Ben W.; Joseph, Gilbert M.; Moseley, Edward H. (eds.). Peripheral Visions: Politics, Society, and the Challenges of Modernity in Yucatan. The University of Alabama Press. pp. 254–266. ISBN 978-0-8173-8336-7. Project MUSE chapter 1439015.
- With Allen Wells, "El ‘Porfiriato Prolongado’ de Yucatán: La Resistencia popular y de las élites, 1910-1915." In Quezada, Historia general de Yucatán.
- "Revolutionary Encounters of the Transnational Kind: Cross-border Collaborations, Border Thinking, and the Politics of Nation-State Formation.” In Jaime Marroquín Arredondo, Adela Pineda Franco, and Magalena Mieri, eds., Open Borders to a Revolution: Culture, Politics, and Migration. Washington, DC: Smithsonian Institution Scholarly Press, 2013, pp. 239–250.
- Joseph, Gilbert M. (2016). "Epilogue. Kalman Silvert and Latin American Studies Today". Kalman Silvert. pp. 175–180. doi:10.1515/9781626375604-014. ISBN 9781626375604.
- Joseph, Gilbert M. (January 2, 2019). "Border crossings and the remaking of Latin American Cold War Studies". Cold War History. 19 (1): 141–170. doi:10.1080/14682745.2019.1557824. S2CID 159125062.
- "Kalman Silvert y los estudios latinoamericanos actuales," In Abraham Lowenthal and Martin Weinstein, eds., Kalman Silvert y la construcción de la democracia. Pittsburgh: Latin American Research Commons, 2021, pp. 169–174.
