= Wayne A. Cornelius =

American political scientist

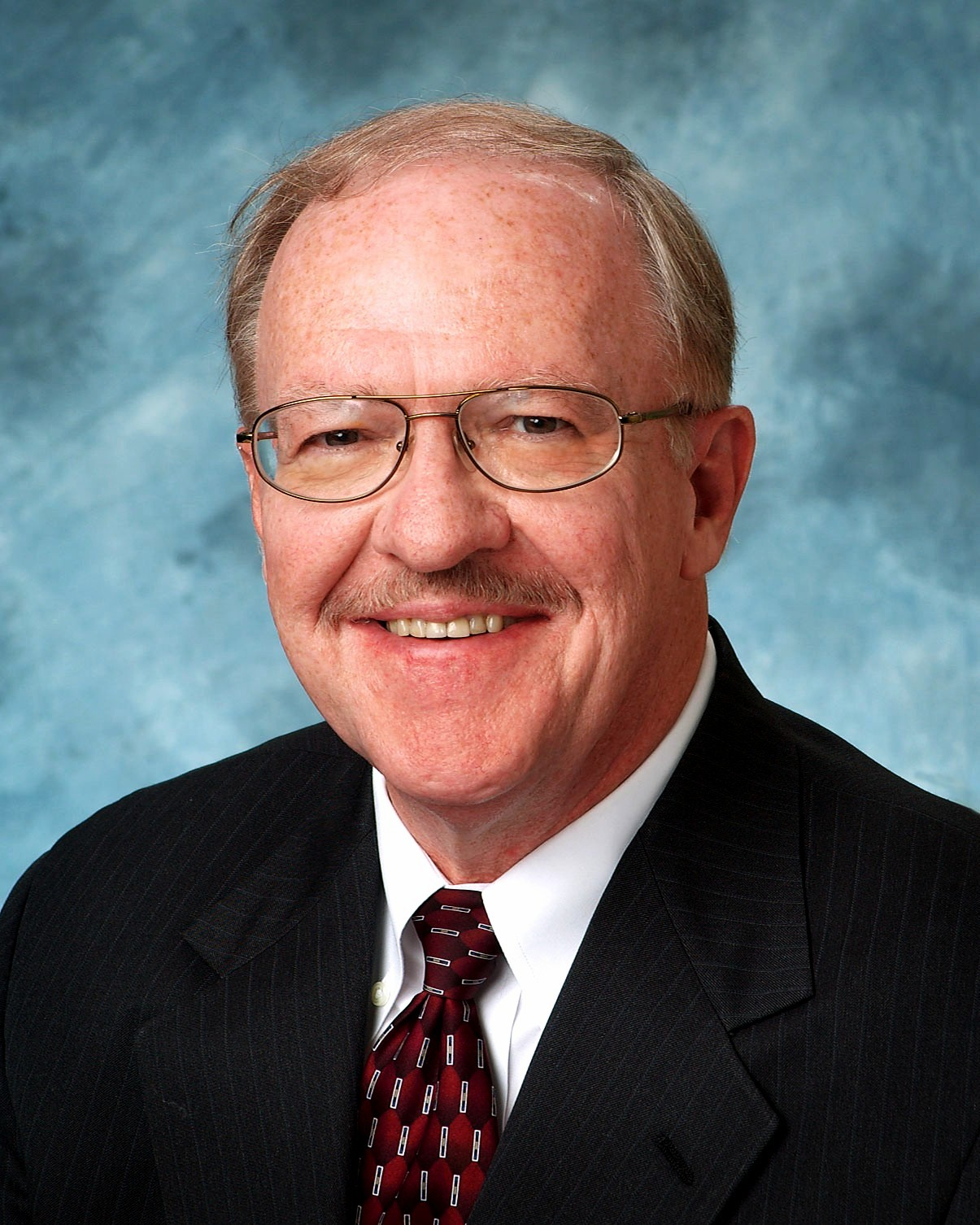
- Born: July 15, 1945 (age 81)
- Education: College of Wooster, Stanford University
- Known for: Work on immigration to the United States from Mexico
- Spouse: Doil Jaralin Rahn
- Awards: President of Mexico Aguila Azteca award for lifetime contributions to U.S.-Mexican understanding, 2009
- Scientific career
- Fields: Political science, sociology
- Workplaces: University of California at San Diego, Oxford University, MIT, Reed College
- Thesis: Politics and poverty in urban Mexico: political learning among the migrant poor (1974)

Wayne A. Cornelius (born July 15, 1945) is an American political scientist known for his work on comparative immigration policy, Mexican politics, and U.S.-Mexican relations. He is Distinguished Professor of Political Science, emeritus, at the University of California-San Diego (UCSD). At UCSD he was the inaugural holder of the Theodore Edmonds Gildred Chair in U.S.-Mexican Relations. He is also Director Emeritus of UCSD's Center for U.S.-Mexican Studies and its Center for Comparative Immigration Studies.

In 1985 he was elected the 17th President of the Latin American Studies Association, the world's largest organization for scholars of Latin American studies.

== Background ==
He was born on July 15, 1945 in Beaver Falls, Pennsylvania. Cornelius received an A.B. (summa cum laude, Phi Beta Kappa) from The College of Wooster (1967; Distinguished Alumni Award, 2009), where he double-majored in Political Science and Latin American Studies. He later received his Ph.D. in political science at Stanford University, with a dissertation on political learning among low-income migrants in Mexico City.

== Academic career ==
Cornelius' career has been deeply entwined with Mexico, where he learned to speak Spanish as a high school student. From 1970 through 2015, he conducted field research in various Mexican states nearly every year.

After a research fellowship at Harvard University's Center for International Affairs, in 1971 he joined the Political Science Department at the Massachusetts Institute of Technology as an assistant professor; he was promoted to full professor in 1978. In 1979 he became a member of the political science faculty at UCSD, where he remained for 36 years, retiring in 2015. He was also a core faculty member in UCSD's Division of Global Public Health in the School of Medicine, specializing in immigrant and trans-border health. He now lectures at the Oregon Health Sciences University (OHSU) and the University of Portland's School of Nursing and Health Innovations.

He also held visiting professorships at Princeton University, Harvard, the University of Oxford (St. Antony's and Nuffield colleges), and Reed College.

He has been a research fellow of the Woodrow Wilson International Center for Scholars, the Institute for International Studies at Stanford University, the University of Tokyo, the Institute for the Study of Labor (Germany).

He is an Associated Fellow of the Global Labor Organization, a nongovernmental organization for research and policy. He has been an elected member of the Council on Foreign Relations (New York).

Much of Cornelius' career has been devoted to building academic programs with significant training components.

In addition to the Center for U.S.-Mexican Studies and the Center for Comparative Immigration Studies at UCSD, he was the founding director of the Mexican Migration Field Research and Training Program (MMFRP), also based at UCSD. Each year from 2004 through 2015, he trained students to gather, analyze and publish data from migration-related field research in rural Mexico and in several U.S. cities, in partnership with four Mexican universities.

== Research ==
Cornelius pioneered in cross-national studies of immigration policy, focusing on the United States, Japan, and Spain. Beginning in 1976, he conducted fieldwork-based research to analyze immigration policies and their outcomes.

Much of this research sought to document the unintended consequences of U.S. immigration policy choices, such as stimulating migrant-smuggling operations and increasing fatalities among undocumented border-crossers. His research also questioned the efficacy of U.S. government efforts to construct deterrence strategies for controlling unauthorized immigration from Mexico and other countries.

In the early 1990s, he developed a conceptual framework for the comparative study of immigration control policies, known as the convergence hypothesis.

He posited that there was a growing similarity in immigration policy, its results, and the general public response within labor-importing countries, and he identified the principal drivers promoting such convergence in nine industrialized countries. First published in book form in1994, Cornelius' theoretical work influenced the way in which scholars understood immigration policymaking and its outcomes across nation-states.

In 1991 he was awarded the Abe Fellowship by the Social Science Research Council and the Japan Foundation, for cross-national research on immigration policy in the United States and Japan.

Cornelius' scholarship is relevant to multiple disciplines, including political science, sociology, anthropology, labor economics, and immigration law. He has authored, coauthored, or edited over 300 publications. His work has been cited more than 16,000 times in refereed journal articles.

== Selected publications ==
=== Books & Edited Volumes ===
- Cornelius, Wayne A. (1975). Politics and the Migrant Poor in Mexico City. Stanford University Press. ISBN 978-0-8047-0880-7.
- Cornelius, Wayne A., ed. (2004). Controlling immigration: a global perspective (2nd. ed.). Stanford, Calif: Stanford University Press. ISBN 978-0-8047-4489-8.
- Cornelius, Wayne A.; Espenshade, Thomas J.; Salehyan, Idean (2001). The International Migration of the Highly Skilled: Demand, Supply, and Development Consequences in Sending and Receiving Countries. Center for Comparative Immigration Studies, University of California, San Diego. ISBN 978-0-9702838-0-1.
- Cornelius, Wayne A.; Shirk, David A.; University of California, San Diego, eds. (2007). Reforming the administration of justice in Mexico. Notre Dame, Ind. : San Diego: University of Notre Dame Press; Center for U.S.-Mexican Studies, University of California. ISBN 978-0-268-02292-1.
- Cornelius, Wayne A.; Fitzgerald, David, eds. (2007). Mayan journeys: U.S.-bound migration from a new sending community. CCIS anthologies. La Jolla, Calif: Center for Comparative Immigration Studies, UCSD. ISBN 978-0-9702838-9-4.
- Cornelius, Wayne A.; FitzGerald, David; Borger, Scott C.; University of California, San Diego, eds. (2009). Four generations of norteños: new research from the cradle of Mexican migration. CCIS anthologies. La Jolla, Calif: Center For Comparative Immigration Studies, UCSD. ISBN 978-0-9800560-0-6.
- Cornelius, Wayne A., ed. (2009). Migration from the Mexican Mixteca: a transnational community in Oaxaca and California. CCIS anthologies. La Jolla, Calif: Center for U.S.-Mexican Studies, University of California, San Diego. ISBN 978-0-9800560-2-0.
- Cornelius, Wayne A., ed. (2010). Mexican migration and the U.S. economic crisis: a transnational perspective. CCIS anthologies. La Jolla, CA: Center for Comparative Immigration Studies. ISBN 978-0-9800560-4-4.
- Cornelius, Wayne A.; Gell-Redman, Micah; Kosnac, Hillary S.; Lewin F., Pedro; Noriega, Verónica; Noriega, eds. (2015) The New Face of Mexican Migration: A Transnational Community in Yucatan and California. La Jolla CA: Center for Comparative Immigration Studies, University of California-San Diego. ISBN 978-1-5197-6786-8.

=== Articles & Book Chapters ===
- Cornelius, Wayne A. (1969). "Urbanization as an Agent in Latin American Political Instability: The Case of Mexico". American Political Science Review. 63 (3): 833–857. doi:10.2307/1954431. ISSN 0003-0554.
- Cornelius, Wayne A. (1974). "Urbanization and Political Demand Making: Political Participation Among the Migrant Poor in Latin American Cities". American Political Science Review. 68 (3): 1125–1146. doi:10.2307/1959152. ISSN 0003-0554.
- Cornelius, Wayne A. (1982). "Interviewing Undocumented Immigrants: Methodological Reflections Based on Fieldwork in Mexico and the U.S.". International Migration Review. 16 (2): 378. doi:10.2307/2545104. ISSN 0197-9183.
- Cornelius, Wayne A. (2000). "Blind spots in democratization: Sub‐national politics as a constraint on Mexico's transition". Democratization. 7 (3): 117–132. doi:10.1080/13510340008403674. ISSN 1351-0347.
- Cornelius, Wayne A. (2001). "Death at the Border: Efficacy and Unintended Consequences of US Immigration Control Policy". Population and Development Review. 27 (4): 661–685. doi:10.1111/j.1728-4457.2001.00661.x. ISSN 0098-7921.
- Marcelli, Enrico A.; Cornelius, Wayne A. (2001). "The Changing Profile of Mexican Migrants to the United States: New Evidence from California and Mexico". Latin American Research Review. 36 (3): 105–131. doi:10.1017/s0023879100019191. hdl:10419/21066. ISSN 0023-8791.
- Cornelius, Wayne A.; Rosenblum, Marc R. (2005-06-15). "IMMIGRATION AND POLITICS". Annual Review of Political Science. 8 (1): 99–119. doi:10.1146/annurev.polisci.8.082103.104854. ISSN 1094-2939.
- Strathdee, Steffanie A.; Lozada, Remedios; Ojeda, Victoria D.; Pollini, Robin A.; Brouwer, Kimberly C.; Vera, Alicia; Cornelius, Wayne; Nguyen, Lucie; Magis-Rodriguez, Carlos; Patterson, Thomas L. (2008-07-30). "Differential Effects of Migration and Deportation on HIV Infection among Male and Female Injection Drug Users in Tijuana, Mexico". PLoS ONE. 3 (7) e2690. doi:10.1371/journal.pone.0002690. ISSN 1932-6203. PMC 2467493.
- Cornelius, Wayne A. (2011-05-30), "Evaluating Recent U.S. Immigration Control Policy:", Crossing and Controlling Borders, Budrich UniPress, pp. 191–204
- Rosenblum, Marc R.; Cornelius, Wayne A. (2012-11-21), "Dimensions of Immigration Policy", Oxford Handbook of the Politics of International Migration, Oxford University Press, pp. 245–273, ISBN 0-19-533722-0
- Cornelius, Wayne A.; Varsanyi, Monica W. (2025-05-28). "Subnational immigration policymaking in the United States: the role of issue entrepreneurs in California, Texas, and Florida". Journal of Ethnic and Migration Studies. 51 (9): 2127–2145. doi:10.1080/1369183X.2024.2441831. ISSN 1369-183X.
- Cornelius, Wayne (2026). "How Trump's Deportation Machine Actually Works". www.mexicodecoded.com.

== Public-facing professional activity ==
Cornelius is known as an activist-scholar, seeking to shape policy debates on immigration and asylum policy. He advised three presidential candidates on immigration and foreign policy issues.

He has published more than 100 op-eds on immigration issues, Mexican politics, and LGBTQ+ rights, appearing in The Los Angeles Times, The New York Times, The Washington Post, The Economist, The Globe Post, The Conversation, and Reforma (Mexico City). He has been interviewed on the BBC World Service's Newshour, PBS Frontline, NPR's Morning Edition and All Things Considered, CBS Morning News, and twice on CBS News' 60 Minutes.

== Awards ==
In 2012 he received the Order of the Aztec Eagle, Mexico's highest recognition for foreign citizens, awarded by President Felipe Calderón for lifetime contributions to better understanding of Mexican migration and other issues affecting U.S.-Mexican relations.

The University of California in 2016 awarded him the Edward A. Dickson Prize for distinguished post-retirement contributions to student training and research and in 2021 UC's Constantine Panunzio Award for distinguished post-retirement public service.

Also in 2021 UCSD awarded him the Revelle Medal, the campus' highest award for emeriti faculty. In 2020 he received the Latin American Studies Association's Kalman Silvert Award for lifetime scholarly achievement. In 2024 he received the American Political Science Association's Career Achievement Award in international migration studies.
