= Federico Gil =

American political scientist

Federico Guillermo Gil (1915 – 2000) was a political scientist and founder and president of the Latin American Studies Association and a recipient of its Kalman Silvert Award for outstanding lifetime service to Latin American studies.

He held the title of Kenan Professor at the University of North Carolina at Chapel Hill.
