= Instituto Global para la Sostenibilidad =

Mexican research institute

Coordinates: 19°16′59.78″N 99°8′12.6″W

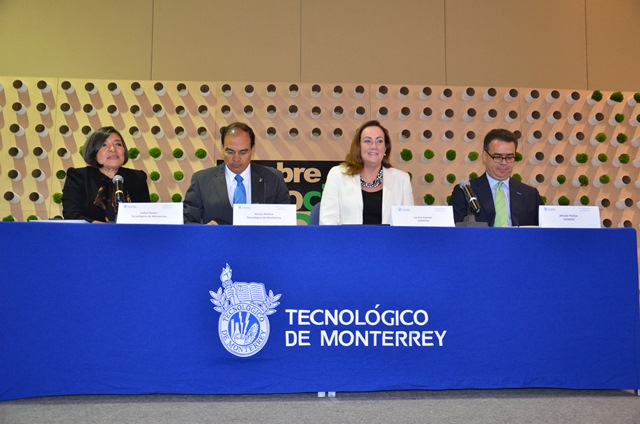
- Isabel Studer, Arturo Molina, Louise Goeser y Alfredo Phillips en el Cumbre de Negocios Verdes del Instituto Global de Sostenibilidad
- Founder: Isabel Studer
- Established: 2011
- Focus: Environmental issues
- Location: Monterrey Institute of Technology and Higher Education, Mexico City, Mexico

Instituto Global para la Sostenibilidad (Global Institute for Sustainability) is a globally and environmentally focused organization founded by María Isabel Studer Noguez at the Tec de Monterrey, Mexico City Campus in collaboration with Arizona State University (ASU). It was founded as an extension of the ASU's Global Institute for Sustainability as an extension, the first and only one of its kind in Latin America. The institute holds and sponsors research, educational events and program and activism on its own and in collaboration with business, educational and governmental agencies.

== Organization ==
The Instituto Global para la Sostenibilidad (IGS) was founded at the Tec de Monterrey, Mexico City Campus in collaboration with Arizona State University. It is an expansion of the Global Institute for Sustainability, founded in Arizona in 2004 and is the first and only program of its kind in Latin America, promoting business solutions, clean technologies, and government models for action.

The institute was founded to promote global environmental thinking in Mexico and the rest of Latin America. Its primary objectives are, to promote sustainable development in Mexico, to generate and diffuse knowledge about green economies and sustainable development and promote coordination of efforts in sustainability at the Tec de Monterrey system. Its main functions are interdisciplinary research into environmental issues, environmental education and creating solutions for businesses and government.

The program has alliances with private and public organizations such as : the UNAM Programa de Investigación en Cambio Climático, Yale University, El Colegio de México, FEMSA, CEMEX, Walmart, Mexican Stock Exchange, Green Momentum, Asociación de Bancos en México, SIGEA, Siemens, Instituto Mexicana para la Competitividad, World Wildlife Fund, Centro Mexicano del Derecho Ambiental, Greenpeace, the Nature Conservancy, the Inter-American Development Bank, the World Bank, the United Nations Development Programme and Korea International Cooperation Agency as well as Mexican agencies such as the Secretariat of Energy, the Secretariat of Economy, the Secretariat of the Environment and Natural Resources and the Nacional Financiero development bank.

== Activities ==
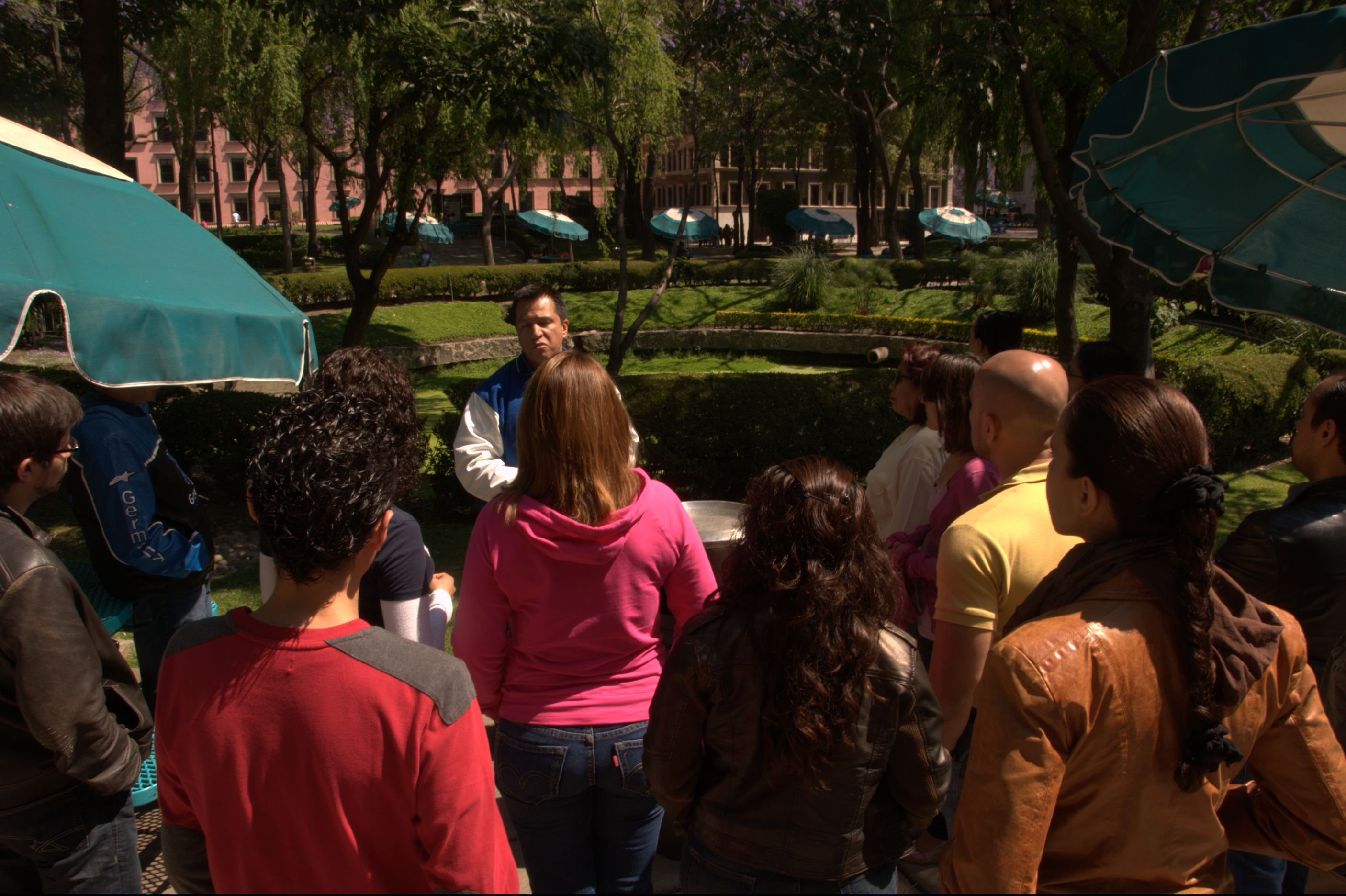
Demonstration of a rainwater collection cistern at the Mexico City Campus

The institute's activities focus on research, education and the support of political and social action related to the environment. Research efforts are multidisciplinary with programs in climate change and sustainability; environmental systems research and climate research. It collaborates with Tec de Monterrey's system of “Technological Parks” to promote the development of environmentally friendly technology, which include the development of cementing materials, adhesives, biopolymers/bioplastics, water purification systems, lead-free electronics, battery technologies and microprocesses. This collaboration involves nine of Tec de Monterrey's research centers including the new Parque Tecnológico de Ciencias para la Vida (Life Sciences Technology Park) at the Mexico City Campus.

IGS offers a bachelor's degree in sustainable development engineering and a master's degree in sustainable development, works with students in other majors at the campus including those in business administration, finance, international business and international relations. It offers internships for students in sustainable energy, communications, small business development, recycling computer technology, hydraulic research and sustainable cities, and supports student projects in hydroponics, with a greenhouse on the Toluca campus, water-recycling with the use of microorganisms, the Gaia group focused on recycling at Campus Santa Fe and TuEnergía, a program to install solar panels and other types of energy generators in homes and businesses.

IGS sponsors conferences, seminars and workshops for business and governmental leaders as well as the public. One of its main efforts along these lines related to the concept of “green businesses” called the Iniciativa Negocios Verdes (Green Businesses Initiative). This includes a “clinic” to help create environmentally friendly businesses, which is sponsored by corporations such as Walmart México, FEMSA and Banorte. It sponsors workshops, seminars and courses in business and environment, creating government programs against climate change and general environmental education for both campus students and the public. Major conferences include Think Green 2013 and the annual Cumbre Negocios Verdes (Green Businesses Summit). The 2012 Cumbre featured nineteen panel discussions and 110 exhibitors, which included Pavan Sukhdev, Peter Webster, George Kell, John Wiebe, Daniel Servitje of Grupo Bimbo, and Louise Goesser of SIEMENS Mexico. An event on journalism in a green economy in 2012 attracted participants and attendees from thirty nine media outlets in Mexico. The institute has also acted as a consultant to various Mexican governmental agencies, including participated in the Foro de Consulta (Consulting Forum) of the federal government in the development of the National Development Plan 2013-2018.

== History ==
The IGS evolved from the Centro de Diálogo y Análisis sobre América del Norte (Center of Dialogue and Analysis of North America) or CEDAN, both founded by María Isabel Studer Noguez. By 2011, much of CEDAN's activities were related to environmental issues, so Studer reorganized the institute, which opened in 2011 as a partnership between Tec de Monterrey and Arizona State University's Global Institute for Sustainability.

IGS's inaugural event included Carlos Gay of UNAM, Martha Delgado of the Secretariat of the Environment and Natural Resources, Ellis J. Juan, director of the Inter- American Development Bank, Irina Maslesnikova, of Xerox México, and Gabriel Quadri de la Torre of SIGEA. It has grown to sponsor research, educational and promotional activities both on the Tec de Monterrey, Mexico City Campus and other parts of Mexico, successful enough to be known in the United States and Canada as well.

Former professors and students of the institute have gone on to create projects such as the Xooc Foundation, which promotes awareness of marine biodiversity of Mexico, DameUnAveton, an online platform to share rides, and Impulso Urbano, a research and service organization to improve housing and public spaces through the use of recycled materials.
