= Kalman H. Silvert =

American democratic author

Kalman H. Silvert, (born 10 March 1921, Bryn Mawr, Pennsylvania, died 15 June 1976, New York, New York) was an author of works on democracy in Latin America, the first president of the Latin American Studies Association (LASA), and professor of political science at Tulane University, NYU, and other universities. The Kalman Silvert Award is LASA's highest award.

== Life and career ==
Silvert was born in Bryn Mawr, Pennsylvania to Henry Jacob Silvert and Ida Levine Silvert. He attended University of Pennsylvania, studying political science and government. He earned his PhD in political science in 1948 from Penn. In 1942, he married Frieda Moskalik, and the couple had three sons.

Silvert’s academic work on Latin America revolved around issues of democracy, repression, and education and focused on particular Latin American countries including Chile, Guatemala, and Venezuela. He was a professor of political science at New York University and the director of its Ibero-American Center. He had previously taught at Tulane University, Dartmouth College, and the University of Buenos Aires.

He was part of the group of scholars who founded the Latin American Studies Association in 1966 to bring together scholars from many disciplines into one organization. He served as an adviser to the Ford Foundation, which aided the formation of LASA. He subsequently became LASA's first president. According to Richard McGee Morse, who participated in LASA’s founding, “If we wanted to set proper standards for Latin American studies, if we were concerned with the mix of intellectual curiosity and moral commitment, or of sciences and humanities (indeed, Science and Humanity), the founding president had to be Kal Silvert.”

The 11 September 1973 military coup in Chile overthrowing the democratically elected government of Salvador Allende was deeply distressing to Silvert, much of whose academic work concerned Chile. In 1974, he participated in the Commission on U.S.-Latin American Relations, chaired by U.S. Ambassador Sol M. Linowitz. The report advocated the normalization of U.S. relations with Cuba.

According to one friend and colleague, Silvert had a “keen sense of loyalty... low tolerance for foolishness and large capacity for moral indignation … [and an] insistence on speaking from the mind and not the gut.”

== Works ==
- A Study in Government: Guatemala. Middle American Research Institute, Tulane University 1954.
- Education and the Social Meaning of Development: A Preliminary Statement (with Frank Bonilla). New York: American Universities Field Staff 1961.
- The Conflict Society: Reaction and Revolution in Latin America. New Orleans: Hauser Press 1961.
- Chile, Yesterday and Today. New York: Holt 1965.
- Man’s Power: A Biased Guide to Political Thought. New York: Viking Press 1970.
- Education, Class and Nation: The Experience of Chile and Venezuela (with Leonard Reissman). New York: Elsevier 1976.
- Education, Values and the Possibilities of Social Change in Chile (with Joel M. Jutkowitz). Philadelphia: Institute for the Study of Human Issues 1976.
- The Reason for Democracy. New York: Viking Press 1977.
- Essays in Understanding Latin America. Philadelphia: Institute for the Study of Human Issues, 1977.
