= Isabel Studer =

Mexican-American climate activist

María Isabel Studer Noguez
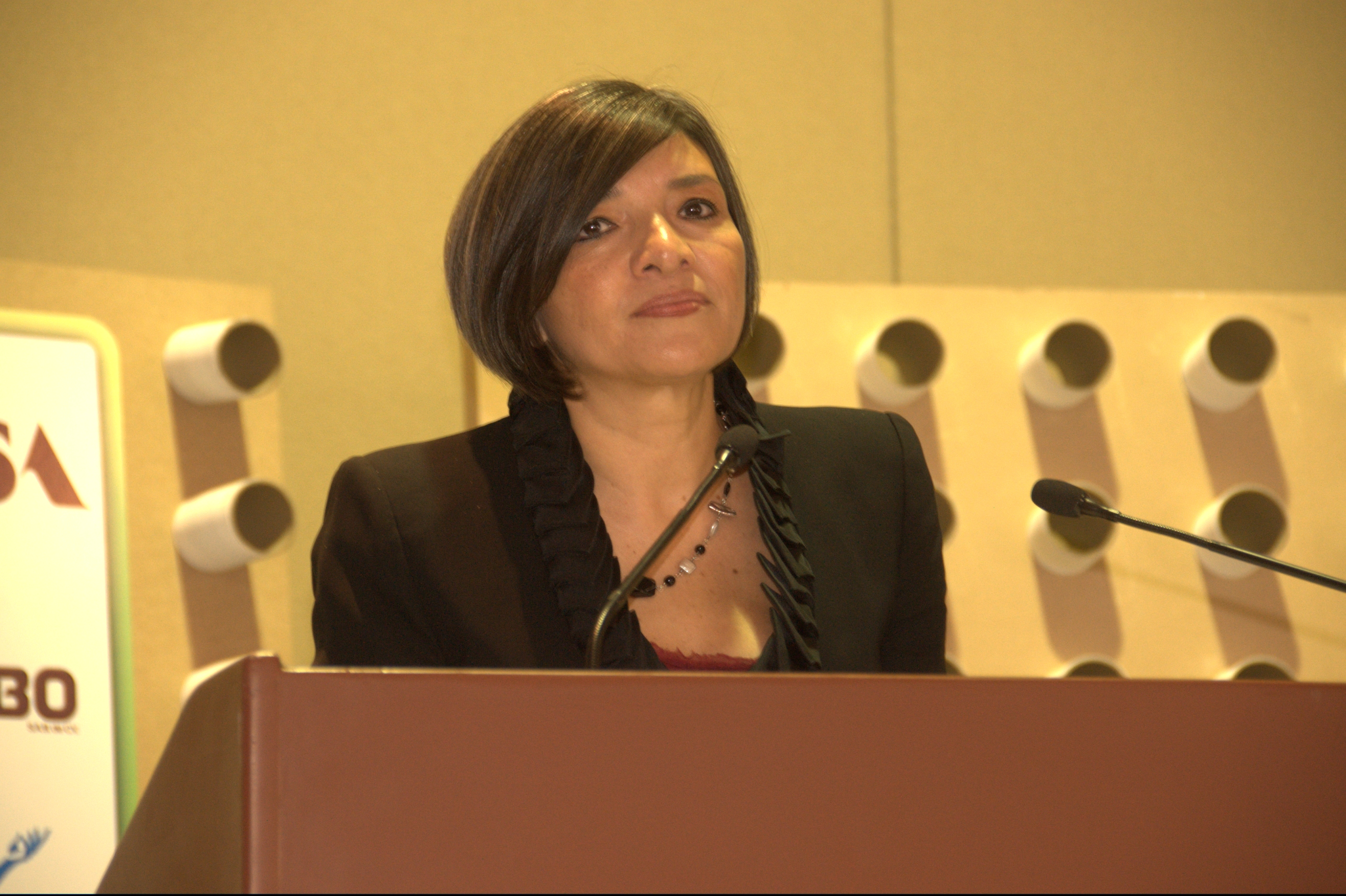
- Studer at the Cumbre de Negocios Verdes event of IGS, 2012
- Occupations: Professor, researcher, strategist and climate activist
- Known for: Founder of the Instituto Global para la Sostenibilidad

María Isabel Studer Noguez is President of Sostenibilidad Global, a non-profit organization focused on building bridges between the private sector and NGOs, communities and local governments to address complex problems associated with the energy transition and climate. She was Director of Alianza University of California-Mexico, Director for Strategic Initiatives for Latin America and executive director for Mexico and Northern Central America of The Nature Conservancy. She was Director General for International Economic Cooperation at the Mexican Agency for International Cooperation, where she launched the Partnership for Sustainability with the aim of engaging the private sector in developing public-private projects around the 2030 Sustainable Development Agenda. For almost a decade, she was a professor and researcher in international relations at the Monterrey Institute of Technology and Higher Education (Tec de Monterrey), principally working as the director of the Instituto Global para la Sostenibilidad (IGS), formerly the Centro de Diálogo y Análysis sobre América del Norte (CEDAN). She began her academic career working in international relations and has held positions in both Mexico and the United States teaching, researching, advising and writing on topics related to international relations, especially in North America, business and environmental issues. Her publications include books, scholarly articles as well as articles and columns for various media.

Today, she is Senior Fellow of The Atlantic Council's Adrienne Arscht Rockefeller Foundation Resilience Center, chair of the Board of Sostenibilidad Global and Inciativa Climática de México (ICM), member of the Board of Directors of the World Environment Center, the Stockholm International Peace Research Institute (SIPRI)'s Environment of Peace, the Sustainability Experts Advisory Group of Dow Chemical, and the Advisory Council for Water (Mexico).

== Education ==
Studer received her bachelor's degree in international relations from the Colegio de México in 1986. She received her masters (1990) and doctorate (1997) in international relations from the School of Advanced International Studies of Johns Hopkins University. Her dissertation was “MNE’s Global Strategies and Government Policies in the Automobile Industry: Ford Motor Company in North America.” In 1993 she did her field research at the Canadian Embassy in Washington. During her studies, Studer received several scholarships including a Fulbright Scholarship in 1988, Galo Plaza Fellowship of the Inter-American Dialogue in 1990, the SAIS scholarship and a scholarship from CONACYT. She is fluent in Spanish, English and French.

== Career ==
=== Academic career ===
She has been a tenured professor and researcher at a number of prestigious Mexican universities and institutions. From 1993 to 1997, she was a professor and researcher at the international studies division of the Centro de Investigación y Docencia Económicas (CIDE), which was followed by a year as a visiting professor at the department of business and economics at Colorado College in Colorado Springs. From 1997 to 2000, she taught at the Instituto Tecnológico Autónomo de México (ITAM) with the international studies department, then was a professor and research at the Facultad Latinoamericana de Ciencias Sociales (FLACSO). From 2005 to 2006, she was an associate professor at the Centro de Investigación y Docencia Económicas (CIDE) and a senior fellow at the Center for North American Studies at the American University in Washington.

=== Work in government ===
Studer began her career as a staff member at the Inter-American Dialogue in Washington, DC from 1990 to 1991. Since then, she has held a number of public policy positions in Mexico and the United States. In 2001, she was the deputy director general for North America at the Secretaría del Medio Ambiente y Recursos Naturales, as well as an alternate representative to the Commission for Environmental Cooperation of North America (CEC). From 2005 to 2006 she was the research director for the Commission for Labor Cooperation in Washington, DC. In 2010, she joined the research program on climate change at the Universidad Nacional Autónoma de México (UNAM). In 2011 she became a member of the Beyond Banking Program committee of the Inter-American Development Bank, and in 2012 a member of the evaluation committee of the Secretaría de Relaciones Exteriores. Dr. Studer was ca member of the Consejo de Cambio Climático (Climate Change Board) with the Secretaría de Medio Ambiente y Recursos Naturales, which advises the president on issues regarding the topic.

=== Tec de Monterrey/Instituto Global para la Sostenibilidad ===
Her research work has been related to the effects of interdependency and its relation to the global economy.

As a professor and researcher for the Tec de Monterrey, Mexico City campus, she lectured with graduate level classes in sustainable development and other topics at the EGADE Business School. She founded and coordinated the Negocios Verdes (Green Business Summit) program. and directed of the Greening of Value Chains Program, a MIF-Tec de Monterrey Program.

Since October 2011, she became the director of IGS. Since January 2008, director of CEDAN Her research work mostly revolves around the Instituto Global para la Sostenibilidad (Global Institute for Sustainability), which is based on the Mexico City campus. The institute began as the Centro de Diálogo y Análisis sobre América del Norte (Center of Dialogue and Analysis of North America) or CEDAN, which she founded and directed in cooperation with the Escuela de Graduados en Administracíon y Políticas Públicas (Graduate School of Administration and Public Policy) on her campus. She states that one frustration of academia is that much of the knowledge that is generated is not immediately useful for making political decisions. Her goal with CEDAN was to create a kind of think tank focusing on generating practical information on things that concern Mexico and its policies.

About eighty percent of CEDAN's activities were related to sustainability, environment and climate change, so Studer reorganized the institute and gave it the new name of the Instituto Global para la Sostenibilidad (Global Institute of Sustainability) or IGS, a partnership between the Tec de Monterrey and Arizona State University. She says that her objective in international studies is to make Mexico a better country, and that its citizens benefit from globalization. The enterprise has become successful enough to be known in the United States and Canada as well.

=== Publications and media ===
Studer has written on topics such as economic integration, regional governance, the auto industry, labor and labor migration, trade and environment, environmental standards, climate change and renewable energy in various publications both academic and popular. She has served as a commenter in various media on topics related to international affairs, issues related to North America (such as NAFTA) and sustainable development. From 2001 to 2005, she was a columnist on international affairs for the newspaper El Universal, later becoming a member of the editorial board of the Reforma publication. She has also served as a commentator at El Palenque of Animal Político. She also regularly writes academic journal articles, mostly related to the process of regional integration and the institutions of North America, especially relations between Mexico and the U.S. and Mexico and Canada.

=== Recognitions ===
Recognitions for her work include being chosen as an associate on COMEXI (Mexican Council on Foreign Affairs) in 2009, a recognition from the governor of Canada in 2009 as well as selection as academic partner at The World Climate Summit in 2010, an ambassador to the World Mayors Summit on Climate and a judge at the “Boot Camp” of the Cleantech Challenge and the Siemens Green Technology Journalism Award in 2011.

In 2013, she received the Académico-Científico award from the Petroleo & Energia magazine as part of their Los 100 Líderes del Sector Energía (100 Leaders in the Energy Sector) 2013 event. Dr. Studer was a member of Mexico's Sistema Nacional de Investigadores from 1994 to 2017, reaching Level II status in 2009.

== Publications ==
=== Books ===
- Designing Integration: Regional Governance on Climate Change in North America, edited with Neil Craik & Deborah VanNijnatten, Toronto: Toronto University Press, 2013. (to be published).
- “Aportaciones de un internacionalista mexicano”. (Input of a Mexican internationalist) Author: Carlos Rico Ferrat. The College of Mexico . Mexico. November 2012. Compilation.
- Réquiem or Revival?: The Promise of North American Integration, edited with Carol Wise, Washington DC: The Brookings Institution, 2007.
- Ford Global Strategies and the North American Auto Industry, Routledge Series of International Business and the World Economy, London: Routledge, 2002.
- “La economía política de la integración regional”, (The political economy of the regional integration), virtual textbook, Masters on Regional Integration, University of Murcia (Spain), the Ortega y Gasset University Institute (Spain) and the International Institute on Government, Management and Policy de Georgetown University (United States), 2003.

=== Journal articles ===
- “Modern Mexico: Shaping the Future”. In: “2012: A New Mexican Vision for North America?”

Task Force Policy Papers, University of Miami. Miami. December 2012.

- “Mercado de trabajo y capital humano en América del Norte”. (Labor market, human capital and labor mobility in North America). In: Foro Internacional. Vol. 52, No. 03, 2012.
- “Who controls North America”. In: Literary Review of Canada. Vol. 20, No. 03., April 2012. Review.
- “A joint research agenda”. In: Canada Among Nations 2011–2012. McGill-Queen's University Press 2012
- “Una agenda de investigación común”. (A joint research agenda) In: México y Canadá: La agenda pendiente. (Mexico and Canada: The outstanding agenda). Mexican Council on Foreign Relations. Mexico. 2012.
- “Mexico-Canadá: el camino hacia una sociedad estratégica”. (Mexico-Canada: The road to a strategic partnership). In: Revista Mexicana de Política Exterior. Issue #92. Mexico. March–June 2011.

== See also ==
- List of Monterrey Institute of Technology and Higher Education faculty
