= Charles R. Hale (anthropologist) =

Charles R. Hale (born 1957) is a scholar of Latin America, Africa, and the African diaspora. He was appointed Dean of Social Sciences at the University of California, Santa Barbara in 2018 and professor of global studies. He is a past president of the Latin American Studies Association (2006–2007). He earned an A.B. in Social Studies at Harvard College and his doctorate at Stanford University. His publications include two single-author books, which have been translated to Spanish, “…más que un indio (more than an Indian)”: Racial Ambivalence and Neoliberal Multiculturalism in Guatemala; and Resistance and Contradiction: Miskitu Indians and the Nicaraguan State, 1894–1987.
