= Charles R. Hale (bishop) =

American coadjutor bishop

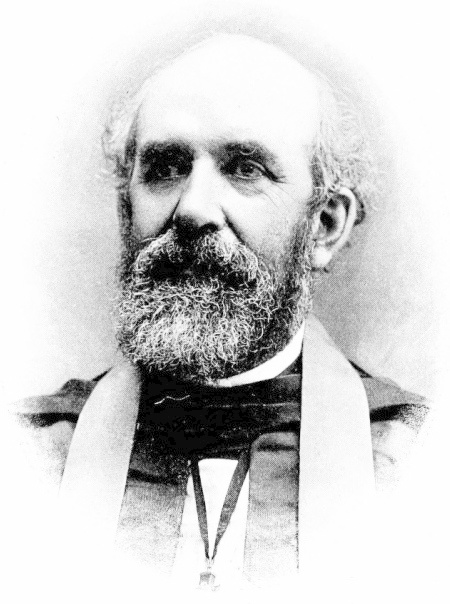
- Born: Charles Reuben Hale; March 14, 1837; Lewistown, Pennsylvania
- Died: December 25, 1900 (aged 63); Cairo, Illinois
- Education: University of Pennsylvania
- Occupation: Clergyman
- Spouse: Anna McKnight Twiggs (m. 1871)

Charles Reuben Hale (March 14, 1837 – December 25, 1900) was coadjutor bishop of the Episcopal Diocese of Springfield from 1892 to 1900. He was commissioned as a chaplain in the United States Navy on March 10, 1863, and served in that capacity until his resignation on March 26, 1871.

== Biography ==
Charles R. Hale was born in Lewistown, Pennsylvania, on March 14, 1837. He graduated from the University of Pennsylvania with an A.M. degree in 1858.

He married Anna McKnight Twiggs on January 12, 1871.

Charles Reuben Hale was consecrated on July 26, 1892, as Coadjutor Bishop of the Diocese of Springfield in the Episcopal Church.

He died in Cairo, Illinois, on December 25, 1900.
