= Latin American Studies Association =

Professional scholars association

- Abbreviation: LASA
- Formation: 1966
- Type: Learned Society
- Headquarters: Pittsburgh, United States
- Website: lasa.international.pitt.edu

The Latin American Studies Association (LASA) is the largest association for scholars of Latin American studies. Founded in 1966, it has over 12,000 members, 45 percent of whom reside outside the United States (36 percent in Latin America and the Caribbean), LASA brings together experts on Latin America from all disciplines and diverse occupational endeavors, across the globe.

== History ==
LASA was founded in 1966 following a meeting sponsored by the Joint Committee on Latin American Studies (composed of the Social Science Research Council (SSRC) and the American Council of Learned Societies (ACLS), held at the Hispanic Foundation (now the Hispanic Division) of the Library of Congress, May 7, 1966. LASA's constitution and bylaws were drafted and on May 12, 1966 it was incorporated in Washington, D.C., as a legal, tax exempt organization, "non-profit professional body created by scholarly area specialists to meet their particular and growing needs." The incorporation of the LASA was the culmination of a long process to create such an organization after the failure of a previous attempt. In April 1958, Howard F. Cline, Director of the Hispanic Foundation of the Library of Congress (1952–71) and the ACLS organized a conference to explore the creation of a coordinating body for Latin American area studies. In 1959, the ACLS and the SSRC formed the Joint Committee on Latin American Studies, which ultimately led to the founding of LASA as an organization. The Constitution and Bylaws of the Latin American Studies Association were published in the Latin American Research Review in 1966. LASA's first President after its 1966 incorporation was political scientist Kalman Silvert, who published extensively on Latin American political systems and conflict. LASA honors Silvert's memory with a major prize. In 1986, the association moved to the University of Pittsburgh where it remained until opening its own facility in 2022, the Latin American Cultural Center, adjacent to the university's campus.

== Mission ==
LASA's mission is "to foster intellectual discussion, research, and teaching on Latin America, the Caribbean, and its people throughout the Americas, promote the interests of its diverse membership, and encourage civic engagement through network building and public debate."

== Latin American Cultural Center ==
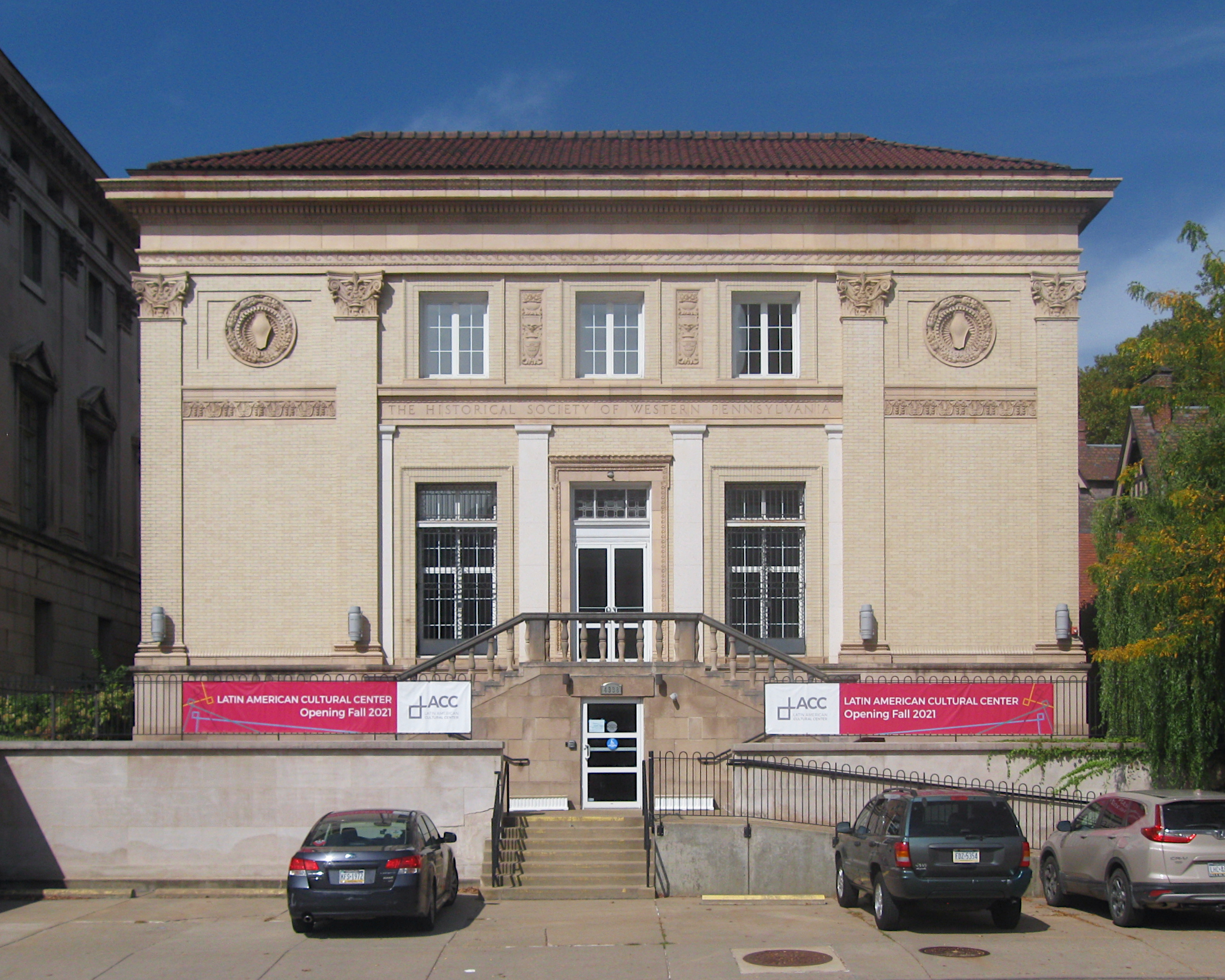
The Latin American Cultural Center in Pittsburgh.

LASA's Latin American Cultural Center (LACC), located in the Oakland neighborhood of Pittsburgh adjacent to the University of Pittsburgh, serves as the headquarters of the association and features museum displays, rotating exhibits, meeting spaces, and a performance venue to showcase live programming that highlights the cultures, music, film, and current day issues of Latin America and the Caribbean. The LACC building, acquired by LASA in 2019 and opened in 2022, the building was built in 1912 by Ingham and Boyd and is a contributing property to the National Register of Historic Places' Schenley Farms Historic District.

== LASA Congresses ==
Every year, specialists on Latin America gather at the LASA International Congress. Featuring over 900 sessions, including plenary sessions and informal meetings, the Congress is the world's premier forum for expert discussion on Latin America and the Caribbean.

- The theme of the 2019 Boston LASA Congress was “Justice and Inclusion".
- The theme of the 2024 Bogotá, Colombia LASA Congress was "Reaction and Resistance: imagining possible futures in the Americas"

== Regional Subgroups ==
At the 1992 LASA Congress in Los Angeles, scholars specializing in Brazil founded the Brazilian Studies Association (BRASA). BRASA now holds independent biennial meetings.

== BRASA Presidents ==
- Leticia de Aquino Machado Eça (Grinnell College), 2026-2027
- Gioconda Herrera (Facultad Latinoamericana de Ciencias Sociales (FLACSO) Ecuador), 2020-2021
- Mara Viveros-Vigoya (Universidad Nacional de Colombia), 2019-2020
- Lynn M. Stephen (University of Oregon), 2018-2019
- Aldo Panfichi (Pontificia Universidad Católica del Perú) 2017-2018
- Joanne Rappaport Georgetown University 2016-2017
- Gilbert Joseph (Yale University) 2015-2016
- Debra Castillo (Cornell University) 2014-2015
- Merilee Grindle (Harvard University), 2013-2014
- Evelyne Huber (University of North Carolina, Chapel Hill), 2012-2013
- Maria Hermínia Tavares de Almeida (Universidade de São Paulo), 2010-2012
- John Coatsworth (Columbia University), (historian) 2009-2010
- Eric Hershberg (American University), 2007-2009
- Charles R. Hale (University of Texas, Austin), 2006-2007
- Sonia E. Alvarez (University of Massachusetts, Amherst), 2004-2006
- Marysa Navarro (Dartmouth College), 2003-2004
- Arturo Arias (University of Redlands), 2001-2003
- Thomas Holloway (University of California, Davis), 2000-2001
- Franklin W. Knight (Johns Hopkins University), (historian) 1998-2000
- Susan Eckstein (Boston University), 1997-1998
- Jane Jaquette (Occidental College), 1995-1997
- Cynthia McClintock (George Washington University), (political scientist) 1994-1995
- Carmen Diana Deere (University of Massachusetts, Amherst), 1992-1994
- Lars Schoultz (University of North Carolina), 1991-1992
- Jean Franco (Columbia University), 1989-1991
- Paul Drake (University of California, San Diego), 1988-1989
- Cole Blasier (University of Pittsburgh), 1986-1988
- Wayne Cornelius (University of California, San Diego), (political scientist) 1985-1986
- Helen M. Safa (University of Florida), 1983-1985
- Jorge I. Domínguez 1982-1983. Stripped of his LASA membership January 2020.
- Peter H. Smith (University of California, San Diego), 1981-1982
- Carmelo Mesa-Lago (University of Pittsburgh), 1980-1981
- William P. Glade 1979-1980
- Riordan Roett 1978-1979
- Evelyn P. Stevens 1976-1978
- Richard R. Fagen 1975-1976
- Paul L. Doughty 1974-1975
- Henry A. Landsberger 1973-1974
- Thomas Skidmore 1972-1973
- Federico G. Gil 1971-1972
- John J. Johnson 1970-1971
- John P. Augelli 1969-1970
- Richard Newbold Adams 1968-1969
- Kalman H. Silvert (political scientist) 1967-1968

== Awards ==
- LASA/OXFAM Martin Diskin Dissertation Award
- Bryce Wood Book Award
- LASA/Oxfam America Martin Diskin Memorial Lectureship
- Premio Iberoamericano Book Award
- LASA Media Award
- Kalman H. Silvert Award - named for the first president of LASA
- Luciano Tomassini Award
- Charles A. Hale Fellowship for Mexican History - named for University of Iowa historian of Mexican liberalism
- Guillermo O'Donnell Democracy Award and Lectureship
- Howard F. Cline Book Prize in Mexican History, named for a founder of LASA

== Publishing ==
LASA publishes an interdisciplinary scholarly journal, the Latin American Research Review (LARR) founded in 1965 by a consortium of U.S. universities. LARR is an interdisciplinary journal that publishes original research and surveys of current research on Latin America and the Caribbean.

LASA has established a publishing house, the Latin American Research Commons, that publishes LARR and other books and journals.
