= Latin American Research Review =

- Discipline: Latin American studies
- Language: English, Spanish, and Portuguese
- Edited by: Carmen Martinez Novo

Publication details
- History: 1965-present
- Publisher: Cambridge University Publishers
- Frequency: Quarterly
- Impact factor: 0.676 (2018)

Standard abbreviations
- ISO 4: Lat. Am. Res. Rev.

Indexing
- ISSN: 0023-8791 (print); 1542-4278 (web)
- LCCN: 65009960
- JSTOR: 00238791
- OCLC no.: 1588206

Links
- Journal homepage; Online access; Online archive at Project MUSE

The Latin American Research Review is a quarterly peer-reviewed academic journal covering research on Latin America and the Caribbean. It was established in 1965 by the Latin American Studies Association (LASA) and is published by LASA's publishing arm, the Latin America Research Commons. The editor-in-chief is Carmen Martinez Novo (University of Florida). Articles are published in English, Spanish, or Portuguese. The journal articles are published only electronically, in an Open Access format.

In 2024, LARR's associate editors are Juan Carlos Callirgos (anthropology, Pontificia Universidad Católica del Perú), Kevin Young (book review editor, University of Massachusetts Amherst), Antonio Gómez (documentary film review editor, Tulane University), Eric Carter (geography, Macalester College), Rosa Luz Durán (economics, Universidad de Lima, Peru), Heather Vrana (history, University of Florida), Vanesa Miseres (literature, University of Notre Dame), Pavel Shlossberg (cultural studies, Gonzaga University), Jana Morgan (politics and international relations, University of Tennessee), Abby Córdova (politics and international relations, University of Notre Dame), and Joel Stillmerman (sociology, Grand Valley State University).

During 2018, LARR received 314 manuscripts and 59 additional manuscripts during the first quarter of 2019. Nearly 60% of them are in the social sciences (sociology, politics and international relations, and economics), whereas slightly over 40 percent originating in the humanities (anthropology, history, or literature and cultural studies). However, of 42 research papers published in 2018, 55 percent were in the humanities (anthropology, history, literature and cultural studies) and 45 percent in the social sciences (economics, political science and international relations, sociology), with literature and political science being the most prominent subjects in each category. LARR also published 27 book review essays and 2 documentary film review essays.

The journal's acceptance rate for 2018 was 19%. Rejections after internal editorial review (i.e., desk rejects) comprised 56% of the decisions and rejections after external review (based on referees' reports) represented the remaining 25%. On average, it took 37 days to reject manuscripts after internal review, 182 days (about six months) to reject manuscripts after peer review, and 367 days (about a year) to accept articles for publication after revisions.

In 2018, around 43% of the authors were women; 20% of the authors were located in Latin America, 10% in Europe, and the remaining in the United States and Canada. Irrespective of the manuscripts' origins, 60 of 72 published articles were submitted in English, 8 in Spanish, and 4 in Portuguese.

The journal also disseminates its articles to a broader audience through the LARR-Panoramas blog, hosted by the University of Pittsburgh.

== Abstracting and indexing ==
The journal is abstracted and indexed in Current Contents/Social & Behavioral Sciences, Scopus, and the Social Sciences Citation Index. In 2018, LARR's impact factor (Web of Science index) was 0.676, whereas its CiteScore (elaborated by Scopus) was 0.74. Its 5-year impact factor was 0.685.
