= Heather Levi =

American anthropologist

Heather Levi is an American anthropologist best known for her research in lucha libre, the style of professional wrestling that was created in Mexico. Levi was born in Massachusetts and became an assistant professor of anthropology at Temple University. She received her Bachelor of Arts degree in Anthropology from the University of Massachusetts in 1990 and went on to receive a PhD in anthropology in 2001 from New York University. She currently lives in Philadelphia.

She is currently doing research on street musicians in Condesa in Mexico City. Her research mainly focuses on performance practices, global and local contexts, and the political uses to which they are directed. Levi has performed ethnographic field work on lucha libre in Mexico City and the significance it has in the Mexican culture. Not only did she do ethnographic field work, but she also trained with a retired lucha libre wrestler and his students. Levi worked with this well respected wrestler for a year and a half and incorporated this as research into her book The World of Lucha Libre This allowed Levi to view wrestling as an arena that examined the connections between ideas of mestizaje, class, gender, aesthetic values, mass mediation, and the state. This thus led her to write her book The World of Lucha Libra in which these ideas are explored. In a Los Angeles Times interview in 2009 she described lucha libre created a unique, cross-class "cultural phenomenon" that put on a "display of these larger-than-life heroes but heroes that everybody...knew [and] came from their social class."

== Publications ==
Books
The World of Lucha Libre: Secrets, Revelations, and Mexican National Identity. Duke University Press, 2008

Chapters in Books
(2005) The Mask of the Luchador. In Steel Chair to the Head, edited by Nicolas Sammond. Duke University Press

(2005) Translation: The Hour of the Mask as Protagonist, by Carlos Monsivis. In Steel Chair to the Head, edited by Nicolas Sammond. Duke University Press

(2001) Masked Media: The Adventures of Lucha Libre on the Small Screen. In Fragments of a Golden Age, The Politics of Culture in Mexico Since 1940. Gil Joseph, Anne Rubenstein and Eric Zolov, eds. Duke University Press

(1999) On Mexican Professional Wrestling: Sport as Melodrama. In Sport/Cult: The Global and Local Cultures of Sport. Randy Martin and Toby Miller, eds. University of Minnesota Press

Articles
(December 2004) Practices and "Reflexivity" In New Dictionary of the History of Ideas. Scribners and Sons

(August 1998) Lean Mean Fighting Queens: Drag in the World of Mexican Professional Wrestling. Sexualities vol. 1. Sage Publications, pp. 275-285.
