= Aztec script =

Pre-Columbian writing system for Nahuatl

Aztec
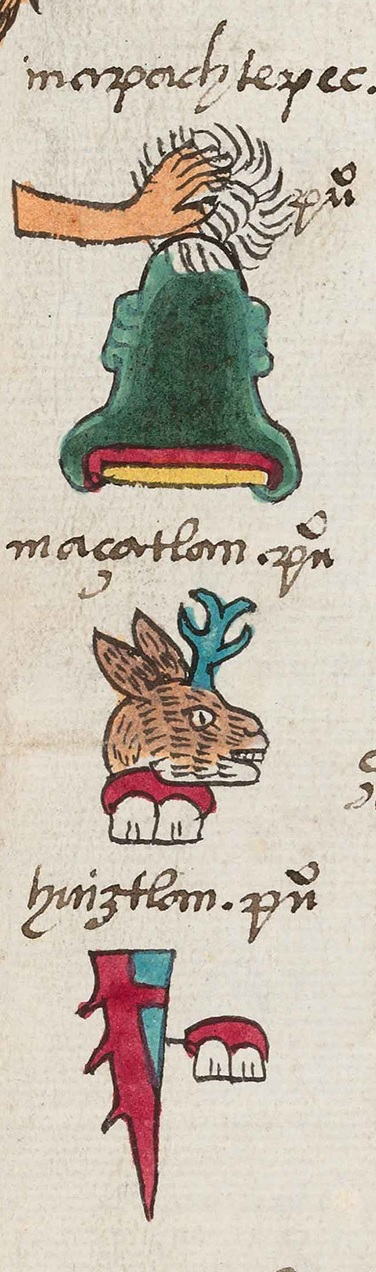
- Script type: Pictographic and logosyllabic
- Creator: The Nahua peoples
- Period: Most extant manuscripts from the 16th century
- Direction: Top-to bottom, left-to right
- Languages: Nahuatl

Related scripts
- Sister systems: Mixtec

Unicode
- Unicode range: Not in Unicode

The Aztec or Nahuatl script is a pre-Columbian writing system that combines ideographic writing with Nahuatl specific phonetic logograms and syllabic signs which was used in central Mexico by the Nahua people in the Epiclassic and Postclassic periods. It was originally thought that its use was reserved for elites; however, the topographical codices and early colonial catechisms, recently deciphered, were used by tlacuilos (scribes), macehuallis (peasants), and pochtecas (merchants).

== Origin ==
The Aztec writing system derives from writing systems used in Central Mexico, such as Zapotec script. Mixtec writing is also thought to descend from Zapotec. The first Oaxacan inscriptions are thought to encode Zapotec, partially because of numerical suffixes characteristic of the Zapotec languages.

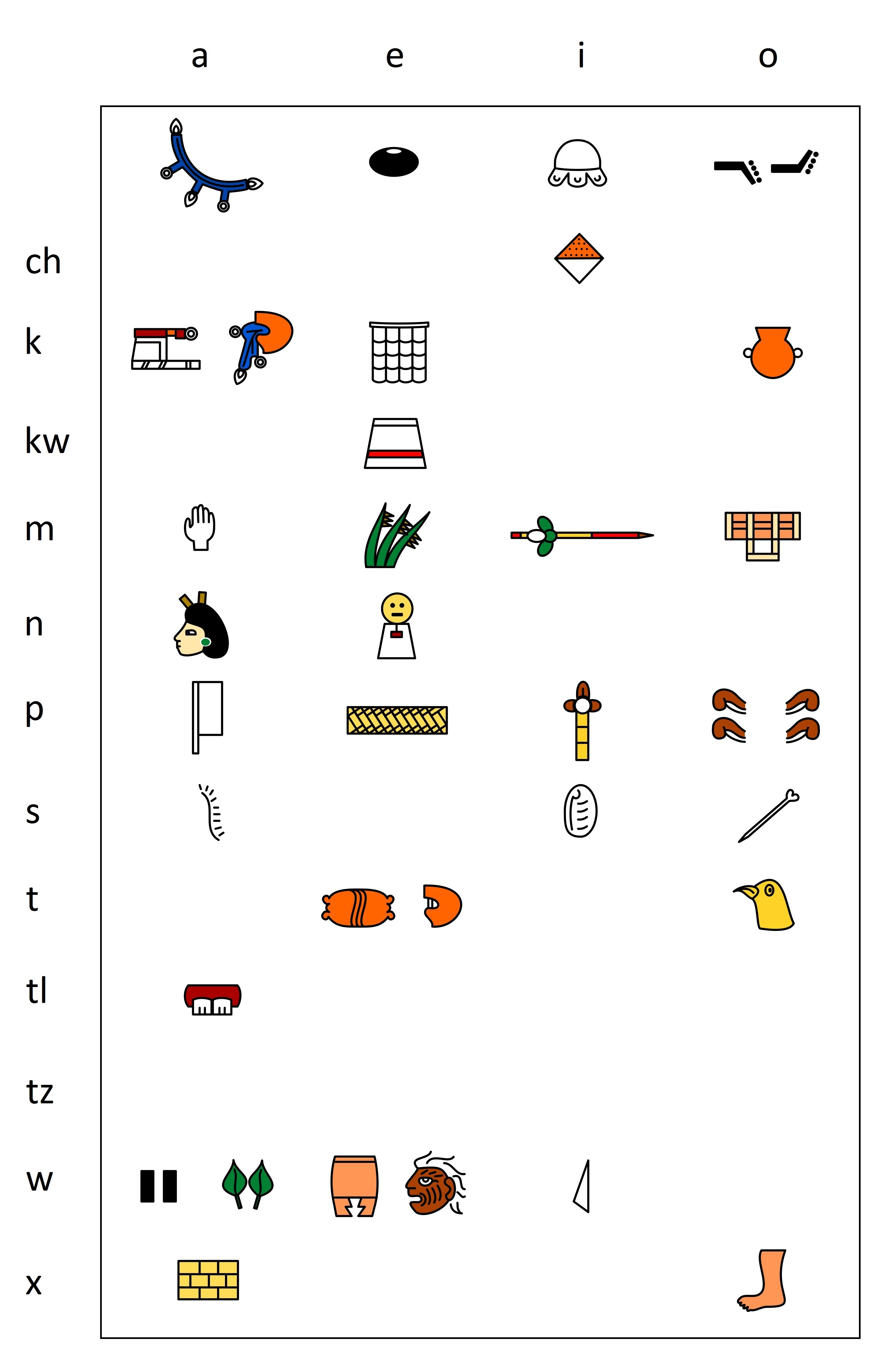
Aztec syllabary (according to Lacadena and Wichmann, 2004)

== Structure and use ==
Aztec was a pictographic and ideographic proto-writing, augmented by phonetic rebuses. It also contained syllabic signs and logograms. Although Western languages distinguish between the painted and the written, Aztec script does not have such a distinction, showing both continuously.There was no alphabet, but puns also contributed to recording sounds of the Aztec language. While some scholars have understood the system not to be considered a complete writing system, this is disputed by others. The existence of logograms and syllabic signs is being documented and a phonetic aspect of the writing system has emerged, even though many of the syllabic characters have been documented since at least 1888 by Nuttall. There are conventional signs for syllables and logograms which act as word signs or for their rebus content. Logosyllabic writing appears on both painted and carved artifacts, such as the Tizoc Stone. However, instances of phonetic characters often appear within a significant artistic and pictorial context. In native manuscripts, the sequence of historical events is indicated by a line of footprints leading from one place or scene to another.

The ideographic nature of the writing is apparent in abstract concepts, such as death, represented by a corpse wrapped for burial; night, drawn as a black sky and a closed eye; war, by a shield and a club; and speech, illustrated as a little scroll issuing from the mouth of the person who is talking. The concepts of motion and walking were indicated by a trail of footprints. The illustration of concepts with graphic expressions contributed Aztec religions to denotation of roles and characterestics of deities in their pictures. An Aztec deity has different combinations of signs establishing a certain homogeneous meaning, rather than the use of a specific representation. Thus, each graphic sign on the picture of deities is an element of the divine personality.

A glyph could be used as a rebus to represent a different word with the same sound or similar pronunciation. This is especially evident in the glyphs of town names. For example, the glyph for Tenochtitlan, the Aztec capital, was represented by combining two pictograms: stone (te-tl) and cactus (noch-tli), and the relative direction of below (-ti-tlan).

Aztec glyphs do not have a set reading order, unlike Maya hieroglyphs. As such, they may be read in any direction which forms the correct sound values in the context of the glyph. However, there is an internal reading order in that any sign will be followed in the direction being written by the sign for the following sound.

=== Numerals ===
The Aztec numerical system was vigesimal as was the Mayan numerical system. They indicated quantities up to twenty by the requisite number of dots. A flag was used to indicate twenty, repeating it for quantities up to four hundred, while a sign like a fir tree, meaning numerous as hairs, signified four hundred. The next unit, eight thousand, was indicated by an incense bag, which referred to the almost innumerable contents of a sack of cacao beans.

=== Historical ===
Aztecs embraced the widespread manner of presenting history cartographically. A cartographic map would hold an elaborately detailed history recording events. The maps were painted to be read in sequence, so that time is established by the movement of the narrative through the map and by the succession of individual maps.

Aztecs also used continuous year-count annals to record anything that would occur during that year. All the years are painted in a sequence and most of the years are generally in a single straight line that reads continually from left to right. Events, such as solar eclipses, floods, droughts, or famines, are painted around the years, often linked to the years by a line or just painted adjacent to them. Specific individuals were not mentioned often, but unnamed humans were often painted in order to represent actions or events. When individuals are named, they form the majority of the corpus of logosyllabic examples.

== Disappearance ==
Aztec script fell out of use due to colonial, ecclesiastical, and governmental authorities, with the help of the local inhabitants who were indoctrinated in Spanish culture. The evangelizers classified Aztec script as a creation of the devil and considered syllabic ideographic symbols as intangible characters. The Old Library of Texcoco, which according to various contemporary sources, contained a larger literary, technical and historical collection than the Old Library of Tenochtitlan, was destroyed by the colonial government under the orders of the religious Juan de Zumárraga, who collected the Aztec documents to be incinerated.

== See also ==
- Aztec codices
- Damago Soto
- Hieroglyph
- Mesoamerican writing systems
- Nahuatl language

== Notes ==
- Lacadena, Alfonso (2008). "A Nahuatl Syllabary" (PDF). The PARI Journal. VIII (4).
- Justeson, John S. (February 1986). "The Origin of Writing Systems: Preclassic Mesoamerica" (PDF). World Archaeology. 17 (3). London: Routledge & Kegan Paul: 437–458. doi:10.1080/00438243.1986.9979981. ISSN 0043-8243. OCLC 2243103. Archived from the original (online facsimile) on 2009-11-22.
- Prem, Hanns J. (1992). "Aztec Writing". In Victoria R. Bricker (volume ed.), with Patricia A. Andrews (ed.). Supplement to the Handbook of Middle American Indians, Vol. 5: Epigraphy. Victoria Reifler Bricker (general editor). Austin: University of Texas Press. pp. 53–69. ISBN 0-292-77650-0. OCLC 23693597.
- Soustelle, Jacques (1961). Daily Life of the Aztecs: On the Eve of the Spanish Conquest. Patrick O’Brian (trans.). London: Phoenix. ISBN 1-84212-508-7. OCLC 50217224.
- Zender, Marc (2008). "One Hundred and Fifty Years of Nahuatl Decipherment" (PDF). The PARI Journal. VIII (4).
- Nuttall, Zelia (2008). "On the Complementary Signs of the Mexican Graphic System" (PDF). The PARI Journal. VIII (4).
- VanEssendelft, Willem (May 2011). The word made stone: deciphering and mapping the glyphs of the Tizoc stone (PDF). Harvard Special Collection: DingoFence. p. 86. Archived from the original (PDF) on Feb 2, 2014.
