= Handbook of Middle American Indians =

Handbook of Middle American Indians (HMAI) is a sixteen-volume compendium on Mesoamerica, from the prehispanic to late twentieth century. Volumes on particular topics were published from the 1960s and 1970s under the general editorship of Robert Wauchope. Separate volumes with particular volume editors deal with a number of general topics, including archeology, cultural anthropology, physical anthropology, linguistics, with the last four substantive volumes treating various topics in Mesoamerican ethnohistory, under the editorship of Howard F. Cline. Select volumes have become available in e-book format.

A retrospective review of the HMAI by two anthropologists discusses its history and evaluates it. One review calls it a fundamental work. Another reviewer says "since the first volume of the HMAI appeared in 1964 is far and away the most comprehensive and erudite coverage of native cultures of any region in the Americas." A review in the journal Science says that "There can be little doubt that, like the Handbook of South American Indians, this monumental synthesis will provide a sound basis for new generalizations and will stimulate additional research to fill the gaps in knowledge and understanding that will become apparent.

Starting in 1981, six volumes in the Supplement to the Handbook of Middle American Indians were published under the general editorship of Victoria Bricker.

== Volumes ==
=== Volume 1. Natural Environment and Early Cultures, Robert C. West, volume editor. (1964) ===
- 1. Geohistory and Paleogeography of Middle America (Manuel Maldonado-Koerdell)
- 2. Surface Configuration and Associated Geology of Middle America (Robert C. West)
- 3. The Hydrography of Middle America (Jorge L. Tamayo, in collaboration with Robert C. West)
- 4. The American Mediterranean (Albert Collier)
- 5. Oceanography and Marine Life along the Pacific Coast (Carl L. Hubbs and Gunnar I. Roden)
- 6. Weather and Climate of Mexico and Central America (Jorge A. Vivo Escoto)
- 7. Natural Vegetation of Middle America (Philip L. Wagner)
- 8. The Soils of Middle America and their Relation to Indian Peoples and Cultures (Rayfred L. Stevens)
- 9. Fauna of Middle America (L. C. Stuart)
- 10. The Natural Regions of Middle America (Robert C. West)
- 11. The Primitive Hunters (Luis Aveleyra Arroyo de Anda)
- 12. The Food-gathering and Incipient Agriculture Stage of Prehistoric Middle America (Richard S. MacNeish)
- 13. Origins of Agriculture in Middle America (Paul C. Mangelsdorf, Richard S. MacNeish, and Gordon R. Willey)
- 14. The Patterns of Farming Life and Civilization (Gordon R. Willey, Gordon F. Ekholm, and Rene F. Millon)

=== Volumes 2–3. Archeology of Southern Mesoamerica, Gordon R. Willey, volume editor. (1965) ===
Volume 2

- 1. Archaeological Synthesis of the Guatemalan Highlands (Stephan F. Borhegyi)
- 2. Settlement Patterns of the Guatemalan Highlands (Stephan F. Borhegyi)
- 3. Architecture of the Guatemalan Highlands (A. Ledyard Smith)
- 4. Pottery of the Guatemalan Highlands (Robert L. Rands and Robert E. Smith)
- 5. Preclassic Pottery Figurines of the Guatemalan Highlands (Alfred V. Kidder)
- 6. Classic and Postclassic Pottery Figurines of the Guatemalan Highlands (Robert L. Rands)
- 7. Artifacts of the Guatemalan Highlands (Richard B. Woodbury)
- 8. Archeological Survey of the Pacific Coast of Guatemala (Edwin M. Shook)
- 9. Archaeological Survey of the Chiapas Coast, Highlands, and Upper Grijalva Basin (Gareth W. Lowe and J. Alden Mason)
- 10. Sculpture of the Guatemala-Chiapas Highlands and Pacific Slopes, and Associated Hieroglyphs (S. W. Miles)
- 11. Summary of Preconquest Ethnology of the Guatemala-Chiapas Highlands and Pacific Slopes (S. W. Miles)
- 12. Archaeology and Prehistory in the Northern Maya Lowlands: an Introduction (E. Wyllys Andrews)
- 13. Archaeological Synthesis of the Southern Maya Lowlands (J. Eric S. Thompson)
- 14. Prehistoric Settlement Patterns in the Maya Lowlands (Gordon R. Willey and William R. BuUard, Jr.)
- 15. Architecture of the Maya Lowlands (Harry E. D. Pollock)
- 16. Tombs and Funerary Practices of the Maya Lowlands (Alberto Ruz Lhuillier)
- 17. Caches and Offertory Practices of the Maya Lowlands (William R. Coe)
- 18. Sculpture and Major Arts of the Maya Lowlands (Tatiana Proskouriakoff)
- 19. Pottery of the Maya Lowlands (Robert E. Smith and James C. Gifford)
- 20. Pottery Figurines of the Maya Lowlands (Robert L. Rands and Barbara C. Rands)

Volume 3

- 21. Jades of the Maya Lowlands (Robert L. Rands)
- 22. Garments and Textiles of the Maya Lowlands (Joy Mahler)
- 23. Artifacts of the Maya Lowlands (William R. Coe)
- 24. Calendrics of the Maya Lowlands (Linton Satterthwaite)
- 25. Maya Hieroglyphic Writing (J. Eric S. Thompson)
- 26. Lowland Maya Native Society at Spanish Contact (Ralph L. Roys)
- 27. Archaeological Synthesis of Southern Veracruz and Tabasco (Michael D. Coe)
- 28. Monumental Sculpture of Southern Veracruz and Tabasco (Matthew W. Stirling)
- 29. The Olmec Style and its Distribution (Michael D. Coe)
- 30. The Olmec Region at Spanish Contact (France V. Scholes and Dave Warren)
- 31. Archaeological Synthesis of Oaxaca (Ignacio Bernal)
- 32. Preclassic and Classic Architecture of Oaxaca (Jorge R. Acosta)
- 33. Architecture in Oaxaca after the End of Monte Alban (Ignacio Bernal)
- 34. Sculpture and Mural Painting of Oaxaca (Alfonso Caso)
- 35. Ceramics of Oaxaca (Alfonso Caso and Ignacio Bernal)
- 36. Lapidary Work, Goldwork, and Copperwork from Oaxaca (Alfonso Caso)
- 37. Zapotec Writing and Calendar (Alfonso Caso)
- 38. Mixtec Writing and Calendar (Alfonso Caso)
- 39. The Zapotec and Mixtec at Spanish Contact (Ronald Spores)

=== Volume 4. Archeological Frontiers and External Connections, G.F. Ekholm and G. R. Willey, volume editors. (1964) ===
- 1. Archaeology and Ethnohistory of the Northern Sierra (Charles C. DiPeso)
- 2. Archaeology of Sonora, Mexico (Alfred E. Johnson)
- 3. Archaeology and Ethnohistory of Lower California (William C. Massey)
- 4. Archaic Cultures Adjacent to the Northeastern Frontiers of Mesoamerica (Walter W. Taylor)
- 5. Mesoamerica and the Southwestern United States (J. Charles Kelley)
- 6. Mesoamerica and the Eastern United States in Prehistoric Times (James B. Griffin)
- 7. Archaeological Survey of El Salvador (John M. Longyear, III)
- 8. Archaeological Survey of Western Honduras (John B. Glass)
- 9. Archaeology of Lower Central America (S. K. Lothrop)
- 10. Synthesis of Lower Central American Ethnohistory (Doris Stone)
- 11. Mesoamerica and the Eastern Caribbean Area (Irving Rouse)
- 12. Mesoamerica and Ecuador (Clifford Evans and Betty J. Meggers)
- 13. Relationships between Mesoamerica and the Andean Areas (Donald W. Lathrap)
- 14. The Problem of Transpacific Influences in Mesoamerica (Robert Heine-Geldern)
- 15. The Role of Transpacific Contacts in the Development of New World Pre-Columbian Civilizations (Philip Phillips)

=== Volume 5. Linguistics, Norman A. McQuown, volume editor. (1968) ===
- 1. History of Studies in Middle American Linguistics (Norman A. McQuown)
- 2. Inventory of Descriptive Materials (William Bright)
- 3. Inventory of Classificatory Materials (María Teresa Fernández de Miranda)
- 4. Lexicostatistic Classification (Morris Swadesh)
- 5. Systemic Comparison and Reconstruction (Robert Longacre)
- 6. Environmental Correlational Studies (Sarah C. Gudschinsky)
- 7. Type Linguistics Descriptions
- A. Classical Nahuatl (Stanley Newman)
- B. Classical Yucatec (Maya) (Norman A. McQuown)
- C. Classical Quiche (Munro S. Edmonson)
- D. Sierra Popoluca (Benjamin F. Elson)
- E. Isthmus Zapotec (Velma B. Pickett)
- F. Huautla de Jimenez Mazatec (Eunice V. Pike)
- G. Jiliapan Pame (Leonardo Manrique C.)
- H. Huamelultec Chontal (Viola Waterhouse)
- 8. Language-in-Culture Studies (Miguel León-Portilla)

=== Volume 6. Social Anthropology, Manning Nash, volume editor. (1967) ===
- 1. Introduction, Manning Nash
- 2. Indian Population and its Identification, Anselmo Marino Flores
- 3. Agricultural Systems and Food Patterns, Angel Palerm
- 4. Settlement Patterns, William T. Sanders
- 5. Indian Economies, Manning Nash
- 6. Contemporary Pottery and Basketry, George M. Foster
- 7. Laquer, Katharine D. Jenkins
- 8. Textiles and Costume, A.H. Gayton
- 9. Drama, Dance and Music, Gertrude Prokosch Kurath
- 10. Play: Games, Gossip, and Humor
- 11. Kinship and Family, A. Kimball Romney
- 12. Compadrinazgo, Robert Ravicz
- 13. Local and Territoria Units, Eva Hunt and June Nash
- 14. Political and Religious Organizations, Frank Cancian
- 15. Levels of Communal Relations, Eric R. Wolf
- 16. Annual Cycle and Fiesta Cycle, Ruben E. Reina
- 17. Sickness and Social Relations, Richard N. Adams and Arthur J. Rubel
- 18. Narrative Folklore, Munro S. Edmonson
- 19. Religious Syncretism, William Madsen
- 20. Ritual and Mythology, E. Michael Mendelson
- 21. Psychological Orientations, Benjamin N. Colby
- 22. Ethnic Relationships, Julio de la Fuente
- 23. Acculturation, Ralph L. Beals
- 24. Nationalization, Richard N. Adams
- 25. Directed Change, Robert H. Ewald
- 26. Urbanization and Industrialization, Arden R. King

=== Volumes 7–8, Ethnology, Evon Z. Vogt, volume editor. (1969) ===
Volume 7. Introduction (Evon Z. Vogt)

Section I
The Maya

- 2. The Maya: Introduction (Evon Z. Vogt)
- 3. Guatemalan Highlands (Manning Nash)
- 4. The Maya of Northwestern Guatemala (Charles Wagley)
- 5. The Maya of the Midwestern Highlands (Sol Tax and Robert Hinshaw)
- 6. Eastern Guatemalan Highlands: The Pokomames and Chorti (Ruben E. Reina)
- 7. Chiapas Highlands (Evon Z. Vogt)
- 8. The Tzotzil (Robert M. Laughlin)
- 9. The Tzeltal (Alfonso Villa Rojas)
- 10. The Tojolabal (Roberta Montagu)
- 11. Maya Lowlands: The Chontal, Chol, and Kekchi (Alfonso Villa Rojas)
- 12. The Maya of Yucatán (Alfonso Villa Rojas)
- 13. The Lacandon (Gertrude Duby and Frans Blom)
- 14. The Huastec (Robert M. Laughlin)

Section II
Southern Mexican Highlands and Adjacent Coastal Regions

- 15. Southern Mexican Highlands and Adjacent Coastal Regions: Introduction (Ralph L. Reals)
- 16. The Zapotec of Oaxaca (Laura Nader)
- 17. The Chatino (Gabriel DeCicco)
- 18. The Mixtec (Robert Ravicz and A. Kimball Romney)
- 19. The Trique of Oaxaca (Laura Nader)
- 20. The Amuzgo (Robert Ravicz and A. Kimball Romney)
- 21. The Cuicatec (Roberto J. Weitlaner)
- 22. The Mixe, Zoque, and Popoluca (George M. Foster)
- 23. The Huave (A. Richard Diebold, Jr.)
- 24. The Popoloca (Walter A. Hoppe, Andres Medina, and Roberto J. Weitlaner)
- 25. The Ichcatec (Walter A. Hoppe and Roberto J. Weitlaner)
- 26. The Chocho (Walter A. Hoppe and Roberto J. Weitlaner)
- 27. The Mazatec (Roberto J. Weitlaner and Walter A. Hoppe)
- 28. The Chinantec (Roberto J. Weitlaner and Howard F. Cline)
- 29. The Tequistlatec and Tlapanec (D. L. Olmsted)
- 30. The Cuitlatec (Susana Drucker, Roberto Escalante, and Roberto J. Weitlaner)

Volume 8, Section III: Central Mexican Highlands

- 31. Central Mexican Highlands: Introduction (Pedro Carrasco)
- 32. The Nahua (William Madsen)
- 33. The Totonac (H. R. Harvey and Isabel Kelly)
- 34. The Otomi (Leonardo Manrique C.)

Section IV
Western Mexico

- 35. The Tarascans (Ralph L. Beals)

Section V
Northwest Mexico

- 36. Northwest Mexico: Introduction (Edward H. Spicer)
- 37. The Huichol and Cora (Joseph E. Grimes and Thomas B. Hinton)
- 38. The Southern Tepehuan and Tepecano (Carroll L. Riley)
- 39. The Northern Tepehuan (Elman R. Service)
- 40. The Yaqui and Mayo (Edward H. Spicer)
- 41. The Tarahumara (Jacob Fried)
- 42. Contemporary Ethnography of Baja California, Mexico (Roger C. Owen)
- 43. Remnant Tribes of Sonora: Opata, Pima, Papago, and Seri (Thomas B. Hinton).

Volumes 6 & 7 were reviewed when the appeared. One reviewer highlights several articles, including those by Eric R. Wolf, Angel Palerm, and Willilam Sanders, but he goes on to say "These volumes are ... more valuable for reference than for reading. Sections dealing with distribution, history, and bibliography are very useful, but sections dealing with social structure or the character of the peoples generally fail to provide integrated analyses indicating the essential features."

=== Volume 10–11. Archeology of Northern Mesoamerica, G. F. Ekholm and Ignacio Bernal, volume editors. (1971) ===
Volume 10

- 1. "Settlement Patterns in Central Mexico", William T. Sanders
- 2. "Pre-Columbian Architecture of Central Mexico", Carlos R. Margain
- 3. "Major Sculpture in Pre-Hispanic Central Mexico", Henry B. Nicholson
- 4. "Mural Painting in Central Mexico", Agustín Villagra Caleti
- 5. "Preclassic or Formative Pottery and Minor Arts of the Valley of Mexico", Román Piña Chan
- 6. "Ceramics of the Classic Period in Central Mexico", Carmen Cook de Leonard
- 7. "Minor Arts of the Classic Period in Central Mexico", Carmen Cook de Leonard
- 8. "Postclassic Pottery of the Central Valleys", Robert E. Lee Chadwick
- 9. "Minor Arts in the Central Valleys", Eduardo Noguera
- 10. "Utilitarian Artifacts of Central Mexico", Paul Tolstoy
- 11. "Basketry and Textiles", Irmgard Weitlaner Johnson
- 12. "Writing in Central Mexico", Charles E. Dibble
- 13. "Calendrical Systems of Central Mexico", Alfonso Caso
- 14. "Social Organization of Ancient Mexico", Pedro Carrasco
- 15. "Structure of the Aztec Empire", Charles Gibson
- 16. "Religion in Pre-Hispanic Central Mexico", Henry B. Nicholson
- 17. "Philosophy in Ancient Mexico", Miguel León-Portilla
- 18. "Pre-Hispanic Literature", Miguel León-Portilla

Volume 11

- 19. "The Peoples of Central Mexico and Their Historical Traditions", Pedro Carrasco
- 20. "Native Pre-Aztec History of Central Mexico", Robert E. Lee Chadwick
- 21. "Archaeology of Central Veracruz", José García Payón
- 22. "Cultural Ecology and Settlement Patterns of the Gulf Coast", William T. Sanders
- 23. "Classic Art of Central Veracruz", Tatiana Proskouriakoff
- 24. "Archaeological Synthesis of the Sierra", Richard S. MacNeish
- 25. "Ancient Sources on the Huasteca", Guy Stresser-Péan
- 26. "Ethnohistory of Guerrero", Herbert R. Harvey
- 27. "Archaeological Synthesis of Guerrero", Robert H. Lister
- 28. "Ethnohistoric Synthesis of Western Mexico", Donald D. Brand
- 29. "Archaeological Synthesis of Michoacan and Adjacent Regions", Robert E. Lee Chadwick
- 30. "Archaeology of Nayarit, Jalisco, and Colima", Betty Bell
- 31. "Archaeology of Sinaloa", Clement W. Meighan
- 32. "Archaeology of the Northern Frontier: Zacatecas and Durango", J. Charles Kelley

=== Volumes 12–15, Guide to Ethnohistorical Sources, Howard F. Cline, Volume editor. ===
Volume 12, Guide to Ethnohistorical Sources, Part 1. (1972)

- 1. “Introductory Notes on Territorial Divisions of Middle America”, Howard F. Cline, pp. 17–62
- 2. “Colonial New Spain, 1519-1786: Historical Notes on the Evolution of Minor Political Jurisdictions”, Peter Gerhard, pp. 63–137
- 3. “Viceroyalty to Republics, 1786-1952: Historical Notes on the Evolution of Middle American Political Units,” Howard F. Cline, pp. 138–165
- 4. “Ethnohistorical Regions of Middle America,” Howard F. Cline, pp. 166–182
- 5. “The Relaciones Geográficas of the Spanish Indies, 1577-1648,” Howard F. Cline, pp. 183–242
- 6. “The Pinturas (Maps) of the Relaciones Geográficas, with Catalogue,” Donald Robertson, pp. 243–278
- 7. “The Relaciones Geográficas, 1579-1586: Native Languages,” H.R. Harvey, pp. 279–323
- 8. “A Census of the Relaciones Geográficas of New Spain, 1579-1612,” Howard F. Cline, pp. 324–369
- 9. “The Relaciones Geográficas of Spain, New Spain, and the Spanish Indies: An Annotated Bibliography,” Howard F. Cline, pp. 370–395
- 10. “The Relaciones Geográficas of Mexico and Central America, 1740-1792,” Robert C. West, pp. 396–452.

Volume 13. Guide to Ethnohistorical Sources, Part 2. (1973)

- 11. “Published Collections of Documents Relating to Middle American Ethnohistory”, Charles Gibson
- 12. “An Introductory Survey of Secular Writings in the European Tradition on Colonial Middle America, 1503-1818,” J. Benedict Warren, pp. 42–137
- 13. “Religious Chronicles and Historians: A Summary and Annotated Bibliography,” Ernest J. Burrus, S.J.
- 14. “Bernardino de Sahagún, 1499-1590
  - A. “Sahagún and His Works,” Nicolau d’Olwer and Howard F. Cline, 186-206
  - B. “Sahagún's Primeros Memoriales.” Tepepulco, H. B. Nicholson, pp. 207–217
  - C. “Sahagún's Materials and Studies,” Howard F. Cline, pp. 218–239
- 15. “Antonio de Herrera, 1549-1625,” Manuel Ballesteros Gaibrois, pp. 240–255
- 16. “Juan de Torquemada, 1564-1624,” José Alcina Franch, pp. 256–275
- 17. “Francisco Javier Clavigero, 1731-1787,” Charles F. Ronan, S. J., pp. 276–297
- 18. “Charles Etienne Brasseur de Bourbourg, 1814-1874,” Carroll Edward Mace, pp. 298–325
- 19. “Hubert Howe Bancroft, 1832-1918,” Howard F. Cline, pp. 326–347
- 20. “Eduard Georg Seler, 1849-1922,” H. B. Nicholson, pp. 348–369
- 21. “Select Nineteenth-Century Mexican Writers on Ethnohistory,” Howard F. Cline, pp. 370–403. Carlos María de Bustamante, José Fernando Ramírez, Manuel Orozco y Berra, Joaquín García Icazbalceta, Alfredo Chavero, Francisco del Paso y Troncoso

Volume 14. Guide to Ethnohistorical Sources Part 3. (1975)

- 22. “A Survey of Native Middle American Pictorial Manuscripts,” John B. Glass, pp. 3–80
- 23. “A Census of Native Middle American Pictorial Manuscripts,” John B. Glass with Donald Robertson, pp. 81–252
- 24. “Techialoyan Manuscripts and Paintings with a Catalog,” Donald Robertson, pp. 253–280
- 25. “A Census of Middle American Testerian Manuscripts,” John B. Glass, pp. 281–296
- 26. “A Catalogue of Falsified Middle American Pictorial Manuscripts,” John B. Glass, pp. 297–309
- Illustrations and maps, 1-103

Volume 15. Guide to Ethnohistorical Sources Part 4. (1975)

- 27A. “Prose Sources in the Native Historical Tradition,” Charles Gibson, pp 312–319
- 27B. “A Census of Middle American Prose Manuscripts in the Native Historical Tradition,” Charles Gibson and John B. Glass, pp. 322–400
- 28. “A Checklist of Institutional Holdings of Middle American Manuscripts in the Native Historical Tradition,” John B. Glass, pp. 401–472
- 29. “The Boturini Collection,” John B. Glass, pp. 473–486
- 30. “Middle American Ethnohistory: An Overview,” H. B. Nicholson, pp. 487–505
- 31. “Index of Authors, Titles, and Synonyms,” John B. Glass, pp. 506–536
- 32. “Annotated References,” John B. Glass, pp. 537–724.

== Supplement to the Handbook of Middle American Indians ==
General Editor, Victoria Bricker

- Volume 1. Archaeology, Jeremy A. Sabloff, volume editor. (1982)
  - 1. Recent Researches and Perspectives in Mesoamerican Archaeology: An Introductory Commentary (Gordon R. Willey)
  - 2. Tehuacan’s Accomplishments (Richard S. MacNeish)
  - 3. The Preceramic and Formative of the Valley of Oaxaca (Kent V. Flannery, Joyce Marcus and Stephen A. Kowalewski)
  - 4. Monte Alban and After in the Valley of Oaxaca (Richard E. Blanton and Stephen A. Kowalewski)
  - 5. San Lorenzo Tenochtitlan (Michael D. Coe)
  - 6. Ecological Adaptation in the Basin of Mexico: 23,000 B.C. to the Present (William T. Sanders)
  - 7. Teotihuacan: City, State, and Civilization (René Millon)
  - 8. The Historical Importance of Tlaxcala in the Cultural Development of the Central Highlands (Angel García Cook)
  - 9. Tula (Richard A. Diehl)
  - 10. Tikal: An Outline of Its Field Study (1956–1970) and a Project Bibliography (Christopher Jones, William R. Coe and William A. Haviland)
  - 11. Dzibilchaltun (E. Wyllys Andrews)
  - 12. The Rise of Sedentary Life (Barbara L. Stark)
  - 13. The Formative Period and the Evolution of Complex Culture (David C. Grove)
  - 14. The Rise of Cities (Richard E. Blanton)
- Volume 2. Linguistics with the assistance of Patricia A. Andrews (1984)
  - 1. Coatlán Mixe (Searle Hoogshagen)
  - 2. Chichimeco Jonaz (Yolanda Lastra de Suárez)
  - 3. Choltí Maya: A Sketch (John Fought)
  - 4. Tarascan: From Meaning to Sound (Paul Friedrich)
  - 5. A Sketch of San Luis Potosí Huastec (Norman A. McQuown)
- Volume 3. Literatures, Munro S. Edmunson, volume editor. (1985)
- Volume 4. Ethnohistory, Ronald Spores, volume editor (1986)
  - 1. Introduction (Ronald Spores)
  - 2. Classic Maya Dynastic Alliance and Succession (James A. Fox and John S. Justeson)
  - 3. Prehispanic Background of Colonial Political and Economic Organization in Central Mexico (Frederic Hicks)
  - 4. Ethnohistory of the Guatemalan Colonial Indian (Robert M. Carmack)
  - 5. The Southern Maya Lowlands during Spanish Colonial Times (Grant D. Jones)
  - 6. Indians in Colonial Northern Yucatan (Nancy M. Farriss)
  - 7. Kinship and Social Organization in Early Colonial Tenochtitlan (Susan M. Kellogg)
  - 8. Socioeconomic Dimensions of Urban-Rural Relations in the Colonial Period Basin of Mexico (Thomas H. Charlton)
  - 9. One Hundred Years of Servitude: Tlamemes in Early New Spain (Ross Hassig)
  - 10. Techialoyan Codices: Seventeenth-Century Indian Land Titles in Central Mexico (H. R. Harvey)
  - 11. Colonial Ethnohistory of Oaxaca (John K. Chance)
- Volume 5. Epigraphy, Victoria Bricker (1991)
  - 1. Introduction (Victoria R. Bricker)
  - 2. The Zapotec Writing System (Gordon Whittaker)
  - 3. Mixtec Pictography: Conventions and Contents (Maarten Jansen)
  - 4. The Annals of the Tlapanecs (Constanza Vega Sosa)
  - 5. Aztec Writing (Hanns J. Prem)
  - 6. Noun and Verb Morphology in the Maya Script (Victoria R. Bricker)
  - 7. A New Look at the Dynastic History of Palenque (Linda Schele)
  - 8. Classic Maya History and Politics at Dos Pilas, Guatemala (Stephen D. Houston)
  - 9. The Copan Dynasty (Berthold Riese)
  - 10. The Middle American Calendar Round (Munro S. Edmonson)
- Volume 6. Ethnology, John D. Monaghan, volume editor (2000)
  - 1. A Retrospective Look at the Ethnology Volumes of the Handbook of Middle American Indians (John D. Monaghan)

Section I
Topical Syntheses

  - 2. Mesoamerican Social Organization and Community after 1960 (Eileen M. Mulhare)
  - 3. Theology and History in the Study of Mesoamerican Religions (John D. Monaghan)
  - 4. Alternative Political Futures of Indigenous People in Mesoamerica (Howard Campbell)

Section II
Regional Syntheses

  - 5. Otomían and Purépechan Cultures of Central Mexico (James W. Dow)
  - 6. Contemporary Cultures of the Gulf Coast (Alan R. Sandstrom)
  - 7. Indigenous Peoples in Central and Western Mexico (Catharine Good)
  - 8. Thirty Years of Oaxacan Ethnography (John D. Monaghan and Jeffrey H. Cohen)
  - 9. The Maya of Chiapas since 1965 (Ulrich Köhler)
  - 10. The Yucatec Maya (Paul Sullivan)
  - 11. Maya and Anthropologists in the Highlands of Guatemala since the 1960’s [sic] (John M. Watanabe)

== See also ==
- Handbook of North American Indians
- Handbook of South American Indians
- Oxford Encyclopedia of Mesoamerican Cultures
