= Huejotzingo =

City and municipality in Puebla, Mexico

- City and municipality
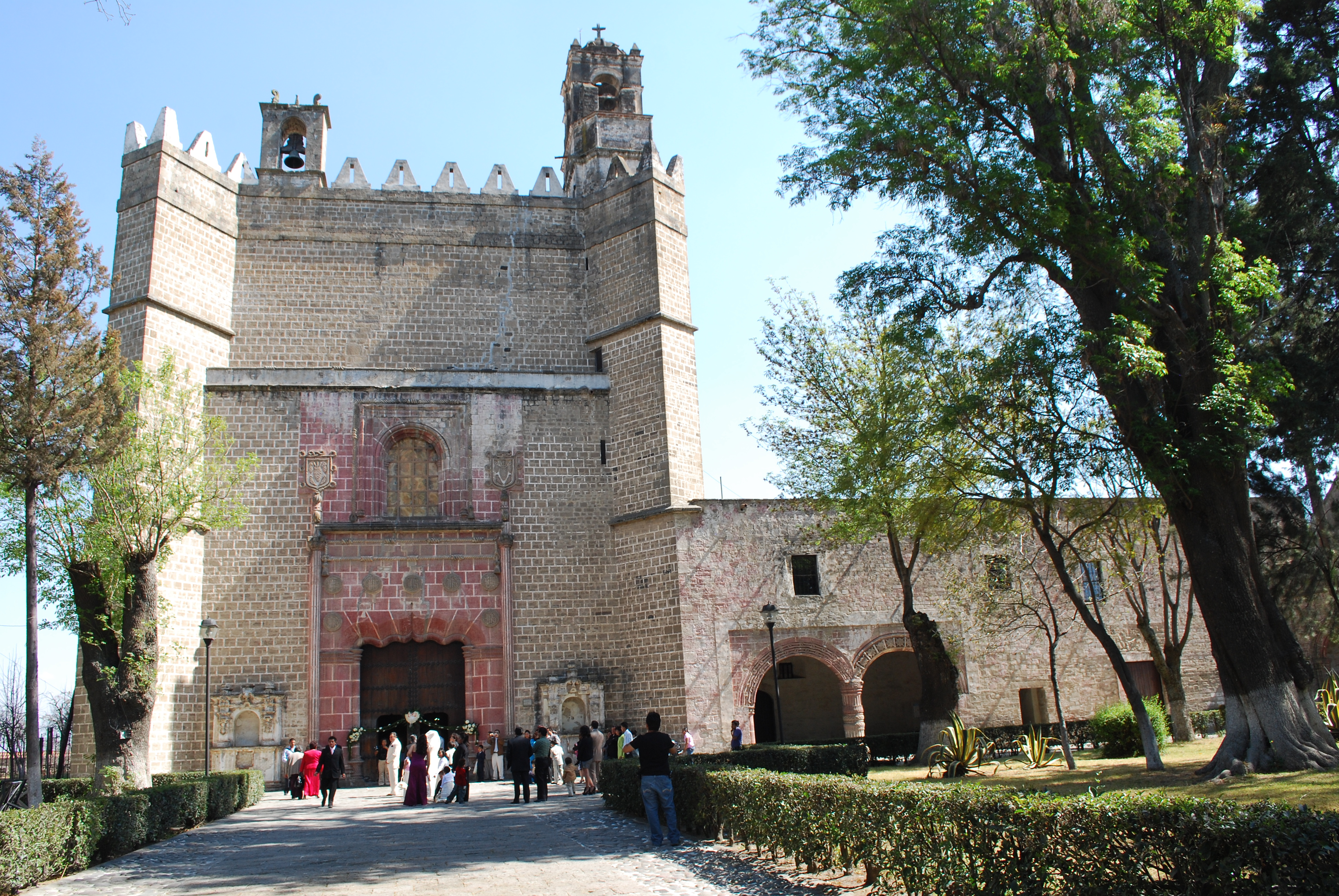
- Facade of the monastery of San Miguel Arcángel

- Coat of arms

- Location in Mexico
- Coordinates: 19°09′43″N 98°24′23″W
- Country: Mexico
- State: Puebla
- Founded: 1529 (Spanish settlement)

Government
  - Municipal President: Angélica Alvarado Juárez

Area
  - Municipality: 188.91 km^{2} (72.94 sq mi)
- Elevation (of seat): 2,260 m (7,410 ft)

Population (2005) Municipality
  - Municipality: 59,822
  - Seat: 23,826
- Time zone: UTC-6 (Zona Centro)
- Postal code (of seat): 74160
- Area code: 227
- Website: Website

Huejotzingo (modern Nahuatl pronunciation) is a small city and municipality located just northwest of the city of Puebla, in central Mexico. In 2023, Huejotzingo was designated a Pueblo Mágico by the Mexican government, recognizing its meaningful cultural and historic importance. The settlement's history dates back to the pre-Hispanic period, when it was a dominion, with its capital a short distance from where the modern settlement is today. Modern Huejotzingo is located where a Franciscan monastery was founded in 1525, and in 1529, the monks moved the indigenous population of Huejotzingo to live around the monastery. Today, Huejotzingo is known for the production of alcoholic apple cider and fruit preserves, as well as its annual carnival. This carnival is distinct as it centers on the re-enactment of several historical and legendary events related to the area. The largest of these is related to the Battle of Puebla, with about 2,000 residents representing French and Mexican forces that engage in mock battles over four days.

== Monastery of San Miguel Arcángel ==
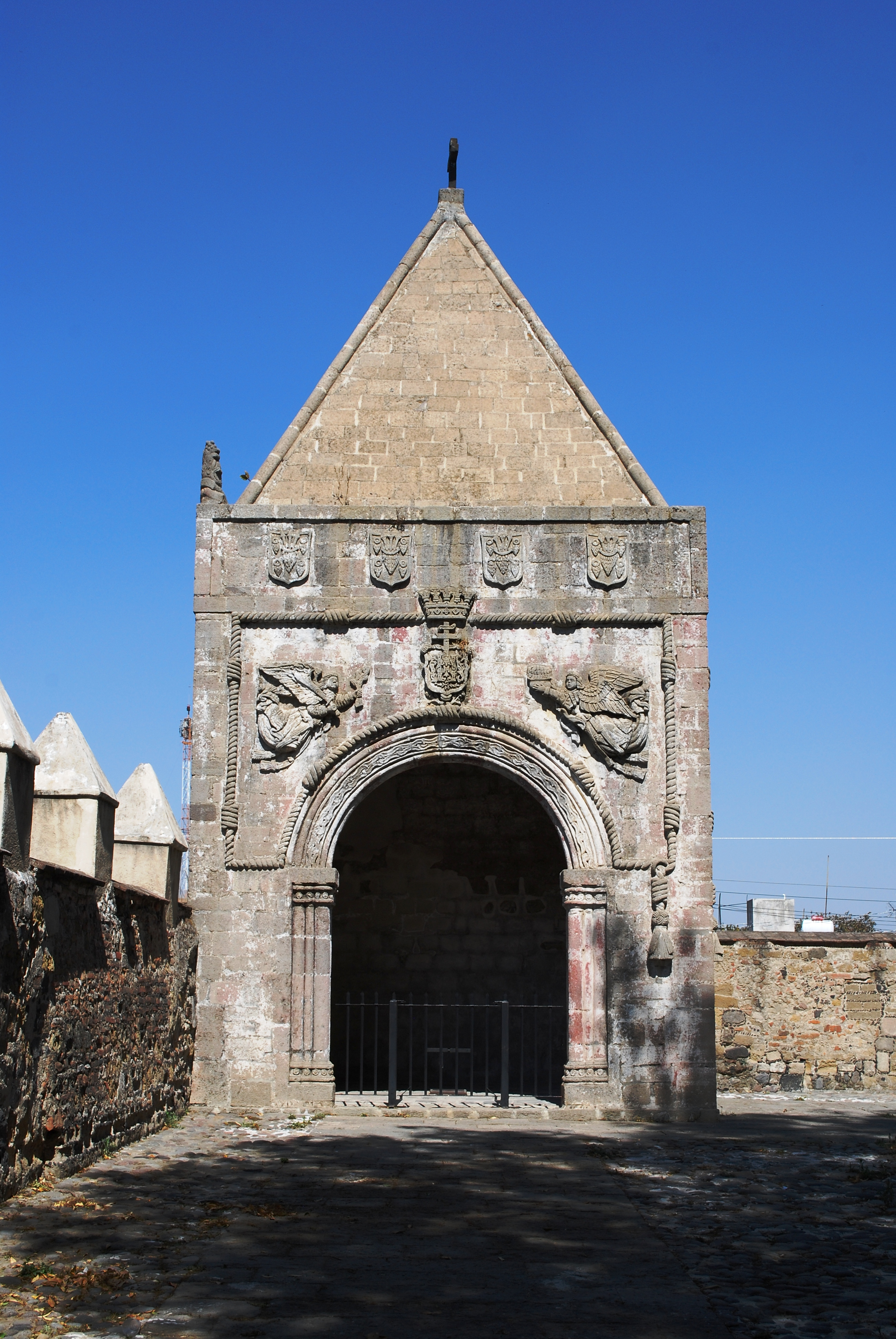
View of the chapel in the northwest corner of the atrium

The Franciscans founded the monastery of San Miguel Arcángel in 1525, in an area outside of the pre-Hispanic settlement of Huejotzingo. That settlement was located on higher ground, closer to the slopes of Iztaccíhuatl, in what is now known as San Juan Loma. Its early founding makes it one of the oldest monasteries in the Americas, and one of the first four Franciscan monasteries established in New Spain. It was dedicated to the Archangel Michael, who would eventually become the patron of the Spanish settlement of Huejotzingo and is the current patron of the modern municipality.

The current building is the third to have been built on the site. The first was a very modest construction that lasted from 1524 to 1529. In 1529, the Franciscans under Juan de Alameda moved the indigenous settlement to an area next to the monastery. Legend states that it was because the friars were tired of making the climb to the indigenous village for evangelization purposes. It was likely, however, to take advantage of indigenous labor to construct a larger monastery. The first monastery was demolished and a second complex was built in its place between 1529 and 1539. However, this building would not survive either, except for old plans and part of a foundation and walls, which were found during renovation work in 1980. The third and current complex was begun in 1544 and completed in 1570, and built under the direction of Juan de Alameda. Construction ended when Alameda died, and he was buried in the monastery. In the colonial era, it was described as being as luxurious as the church of San Juan de los Reyes in Toledo and one of the most beautiful in Mexico. Since then, the complex has survived a number of earthquakes with little damage. In the 1990s, it became one of fourteen monasteries around the Popocatepetl volcano declared a World Heritage Site. The state of Puebla promotes tourism of the monastery through its "Franciscan Route," which connects it with other 16th-century Franciscan monasteries in Calpan and Cholula.

The basic elements of the complex are the atrium with its corner chapels called "capillas posas," cloister, and main church. It is all constructed on a rectangular platform that measures 14,400m2 and rises six meters above the adjacent land. The complex is isolated from the outside by a thick stone atrium wall topped by merlons. These merlons are repeated on the walls of the church and cloister. These merlons are not the typical European style. Their form is similar to elements found in various pre-Hispanic constructions. The thick walls, merlons and narrow windows made the complex a fortress, not only to protect the monks from hostile native populations initially, but also to provide the local community later with a shelter in case of attack.

The atrium of the monastery faces west, towards the main plaza of the modern city. Between this plaza and the main access there is a small plaza. From this small plaza, one climbs a series of stairs to the atrium gate, which is an arcade of three arches with decorations in relief. The atrium takes up most of the monastery grounds and is rectangular, measuring sixty meters long. The most elaborate feature of the atrium is the four chapels embedded in each of the area's four corners, constructed around 1550. They were used for processions, especially for the storage of the Host for processions, but they were also used as chapels to serve the many indigenous of the area in the 16th century. They are elaborately decorated with the Franciscan coat of arms, cords like those worn by Franciscan monks with tassels and other symbols. This decorative feature can be seen in other parts of the complex as well. In the center of the atrium, on the pathway between the main atrium entrance and the entrance to the church, there is an atrium cross. Most histories of the monastery, but not all, state that this atrium cross is not the original, but rather used to belong to one of the corner chapels. The cross is done in sandstone and imitates two knotty tree trunks, with a crown of thorns at the foot.

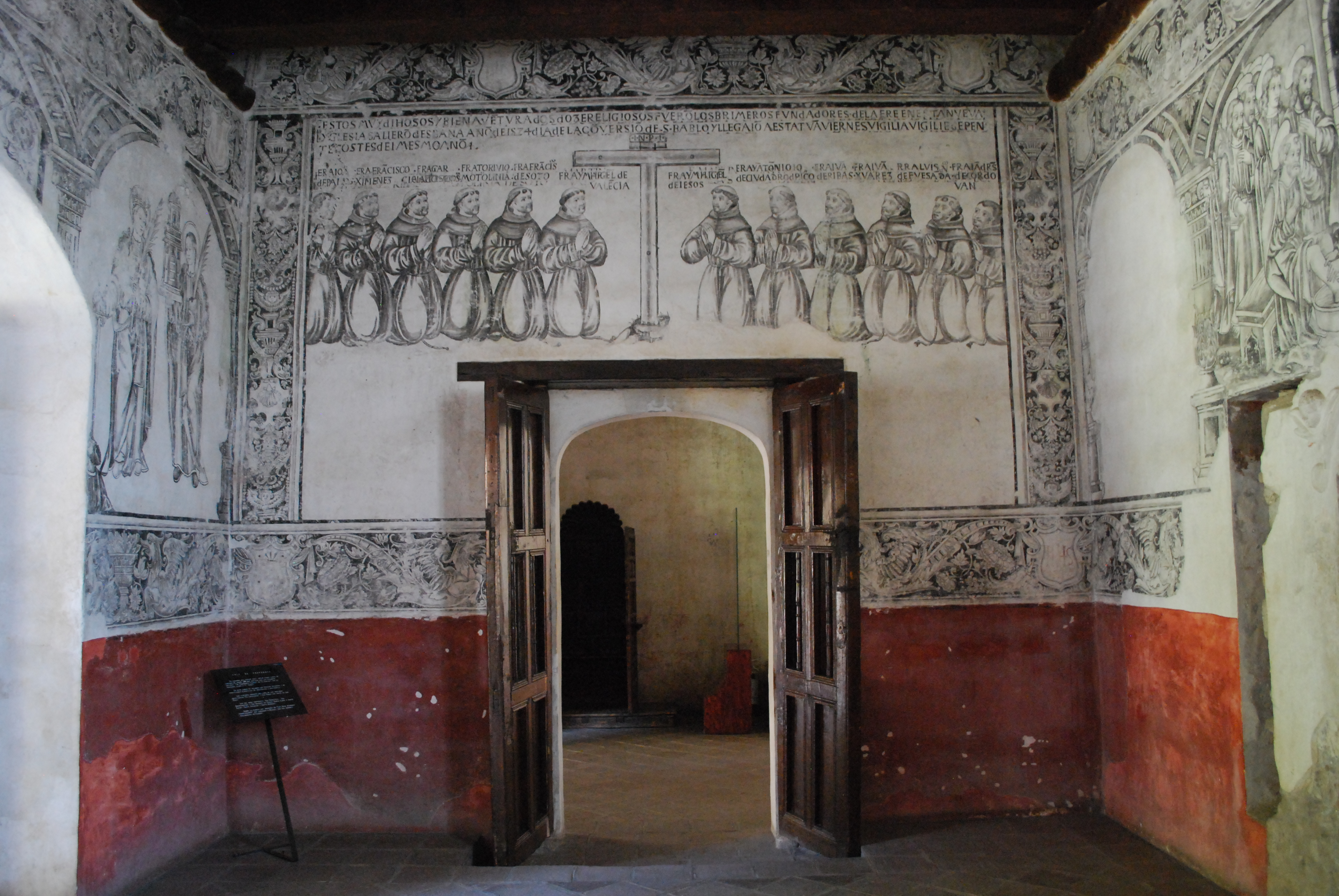
Mural depicting the first twelve Franciscans in Mexico

The monastery also has associated with it a system of aqueducts to bring water here from the Xopanac River. Remnants of it can be seen today.

The architecture of the large church and monastery area is a mix of medieval and Renaissance styles, with Plateresque and Moorish elements standing out. The Plateresque is evident in the large smooth areas with little ornamental work on the facade and north side of the church. This side has a portal decorated with leaves and thistles. The entrance to the church is flanked by tall classical columns, whose capitals support a narrow cornice to form an alfiz. This is decorated with a Franciscan-style cord and seven anagrams in Greek and Latin. Moorish influence is seen in the door arch of the main portal.

The interior has only one nave. There are remnants of frescos on the walls, the best preserved of which show a precession of men in hoods, called "Los encapuchados" (The hooded ones). The main altar is one of the few from the 16th century that remain in Mexico, made by Simon Pereyns. Another unusual feature is the stonework around the door to the sacristy, which forms a crisscross pattern of flowers.

The entrance to the monastery area is on the south side of the complex's facade. It consists of two wide arches supported in the center by a large column. The interior of the cloister retains all of its original architectural elements, and includes the courtyard, fountain, monks’ cells, refectory, kitchen, gardens, and a meditation/prayer room called the sala de profundis. This room contains the best preserved mural work in the complex, including a depiction of the first twelve Franciscans to arrive in Mexico, headed by Martin de Valencia. This cloister today houses the Museo de Evangelización del ex convento de San Miguel (Evangelization Museum of the former monastery of San Miguel), under the administration of the INAH with Gabriel Maritano Garci as director. It contains a modest collection of artworks and other artifacts from the colonial period such as baptismal fonts and religious paraphernalia as well as displays explaining the evangelization work done by the Franciscans after the Conquest.

== Carnival ==
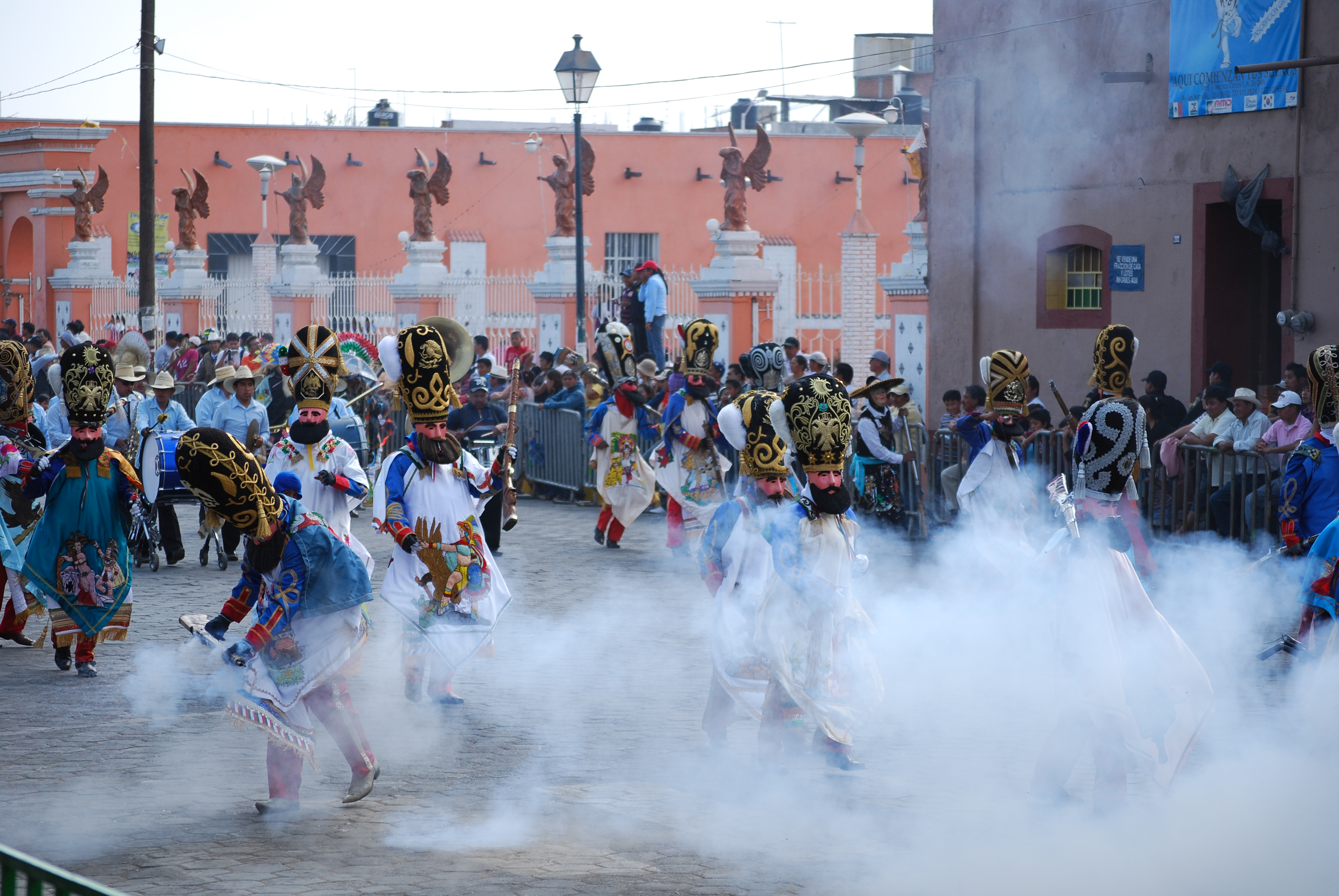
Early parade of "zapadores" at the 2011 carnival

The carnival of Huejotzingo is unlike any other carnival in Mexico or in the world, and it is famous both in Puebla and other parts of the country. The annual event can draw up to 35,000 visitors from both Mexico and abroad, and costs about 2 million pesos to produce. Only about 250,000 comes from the local government, with the rest coming from donations by the local residents. The costumed participants are residents of the municipality and range in age from five to over fifty, and many families have participated for generations. All of the costumes are produced locally, including the "Turkish" shoes (modified running shoes), hand-carved wooden muskets, and elaborately decorated pants, shirts, and other clothing items. Up to 10,000 are in some kind of costume for the event. The firing of the many muskets over the four days can use as much as five tons of gunpowder and there have been accidents which have resulted in injuries and even death. Historically, this carnival has been linked to both the pre-Hispanic festivities related to the god Tlaloc and the "flower wars" of the same epoch. There was a festival dedicated to the rain god, but this was transformed in the colonial period into a festival with masked dancers. Elements of the modern carnival are also said to allude to the wars, in which the objective was not to kill or conquer, but rather to capture warriors for sacrifice. The modern carnival event officially began in 1869 and has been held annually ever since.

Preparations begin in January, with a formal meeting/party on the first Sunday of the year. There is masked dancing to live music. This event is called desfiguros (disfigured) or los viejitos (the little old ones). Officially, carnival begins on the weekend before Ash Wednesday. Saturday begins with a parade at about four in the afternoon. The organizers of the year's event, called generals, enter the municipal palace to have the municipal president sign a document turning over the main plaza of the town to the "general in chief." Then the other generals hang banners around the center blocks of the city to announce that carnival has begun. For the next four days, people listen and dance to music, set off fireworks and more, but what makes the Huejotzingo carnival different is the reenactment of three elements of the area's history and lore, which occur repeatedly over the course of the event. The first is the kidnapping of the daughter of the Corregidor by Agustín Lorenzo. The second commemorates the Battle of Puebla, and the last depicts the first marriage of Indians by Catholic rite in Latin America.

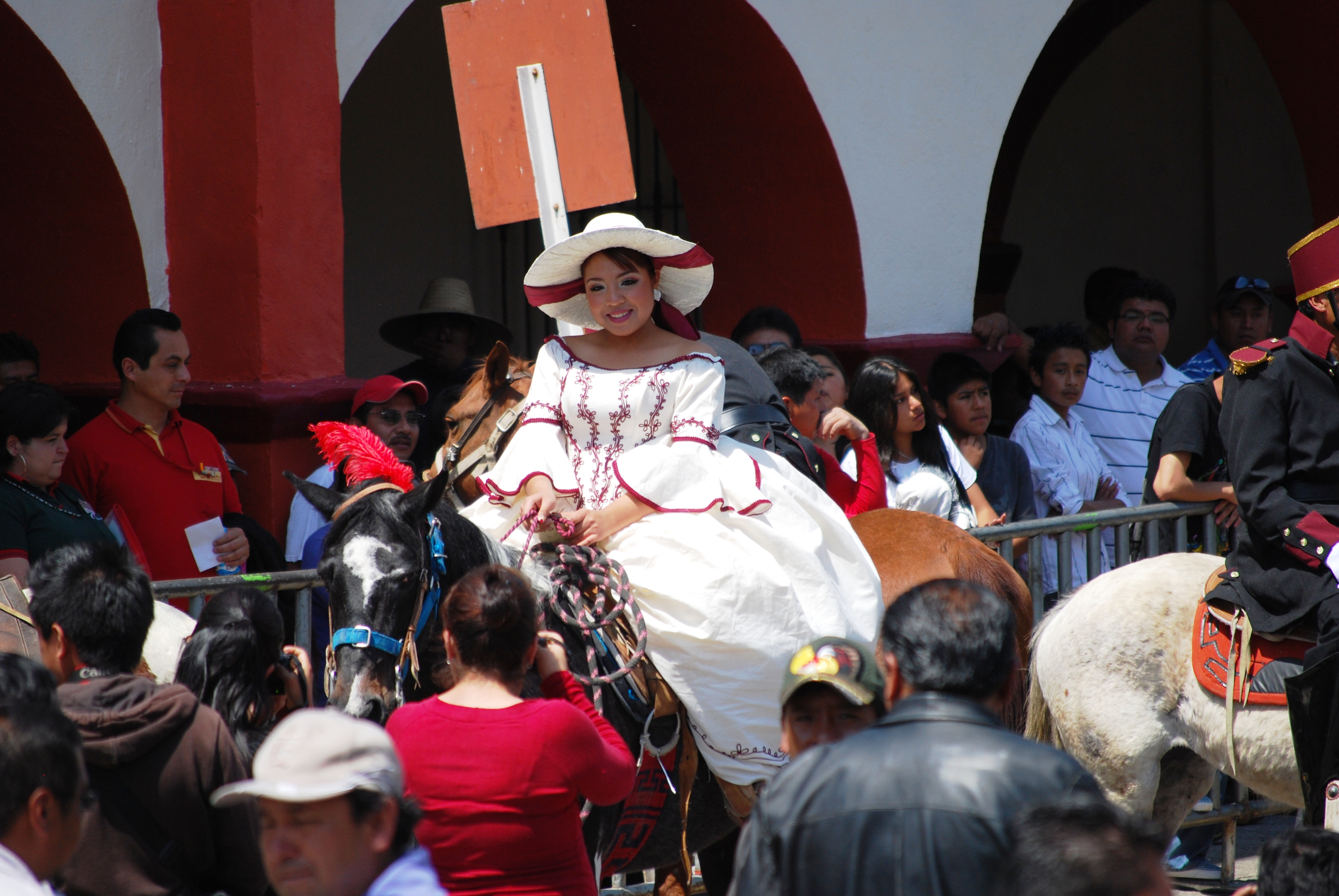
The corregidor's daughter for 2011

Agustín Lorenzo was a bandit during the colonial period, whose story has since been romanticized. According to legend, he and the daughter of the Corregidor were in love. At the beginning of this reenactment, the woman who plays the daughter arrives at the municipal palace to climb up to the balcony to be kidnapped. The man playing Lorenzo arrives on horseback to take the woman, climbing up a rope ladder. He descends with the woman, who is already dressed in white. As the couple flees, they are pursued by lawmen also on horseback. Spectators, including those playing French and Mexican soldiers for another reenactment, generally cheer on the bandit and his bride. As those on horses leave, a small hut is burned on the main plaza. This is because it is said that Lorenzo carried the woman away to his hut and the Corregidor ordered it burned. The reenactment ends with the wedding of Lorenzo and the daughter by a priest and Lorenzo becomes an honest man. While this wedding is happening, on the other side of the same plaza, another wedding takes place. This is the reenactment of the first indigenous couple to be wed with Catholic rites in the area. Tradition states it was the first of its kind on the Americas.

The most extensive event is based on the Battle of Puebla, which occurred in the 19th century between French and Mexican troops in this region. For this, the residents of the four principal neighborhoods of the city are divided into four "battalions," each headed by a "general." Over all four days, these battalions, totaling about 2,000 people, participate in mock battles, firing their wooden muskets at each other, which fills the air with gunpowder smoke. During this time, the battalions eat together and even visit the graves of former members who have died. About thirty percent of the participants are women, who are dressed and masked as men. The four battalions divide into two battalions representing the French and two battalions representing the Mexicans. However, the uniforms are not historically accurate. The "French" are costumed as Zouaves and "zapadores", which are based somewhat on French attire, but others dress as "Turks" complete with turbans. The Mexican side are costumed as "serranos," "zacapoaxtlas," and "apaches" (with headdress).

Each participant pays a fee of between 300 and 500 pesos to participate, along with buying the approximately four kilos of gunpowder they will burn over the event. The generals hire the bands that play for the four days, which cost about 60,000 pesos per band over the four days. Participants also put a lot of money into the costumes that they wear. The values of garments worn can be as high as 30,000 pesos, depending on the type of garment (zacapoaxtla, traje serrano, etc.) and the quantity and quality of the adornments. All carry wooden rifles or muskets, which are also decorated.

The zacapoaxtla is a shirt with loose pants made of natural cotton cloth. At the front and back they are adorned with colored stripes which are embroidered often adding sequins, beads and other elements. Added to this are white embroidered hosiery, bags that carry ammunition and/or a pistol holder. It is finished with a leather mask, which has a beard woven from real human hair. The traje serrano consists of a black cotton shirt and pants, with an animal skin around the shoulders, a hat made of palm fronds, and huarache sandals. If worn with a pre-Hispanic headdress and jewelry, it is called a traje de apache. A zapador is an outfit with a shirt, a short blue jacket, and red baggy pants and an embroidered apron-like garment. The wearer also has a hat and a mask with mustache and beard. "Turco" (Turkish) dress consists of a white shirt and pants, with a small blue vest, a turban with a peacock feather, and a mask with a mustache and beard. They can also have silk capes embroidered with the images of Mexican heroes.

The most important day is Tuesday, when activities begin at one or two in the morning, with a gathering of food and drink by the battalions. At around six am, the participants eat the gathered breakfast and then go to the local cemeteries to pay honor to dancers who may have died during the year. At twelve pm, parades and other events take places similar to the days before. At six pm, the battalions are officially "dismissed" and partying until midnight begins.

The Carnival is extremely popular with local children, who are often seen on the streets in costume with miniature rifles. The Sunday after Ash Wednesday is reserved for a "Children’s Carnival" (Carnaval Infantil). In this event, there is strict control over the use of fireworks and gunpowder to protect the children.

== Economy ==
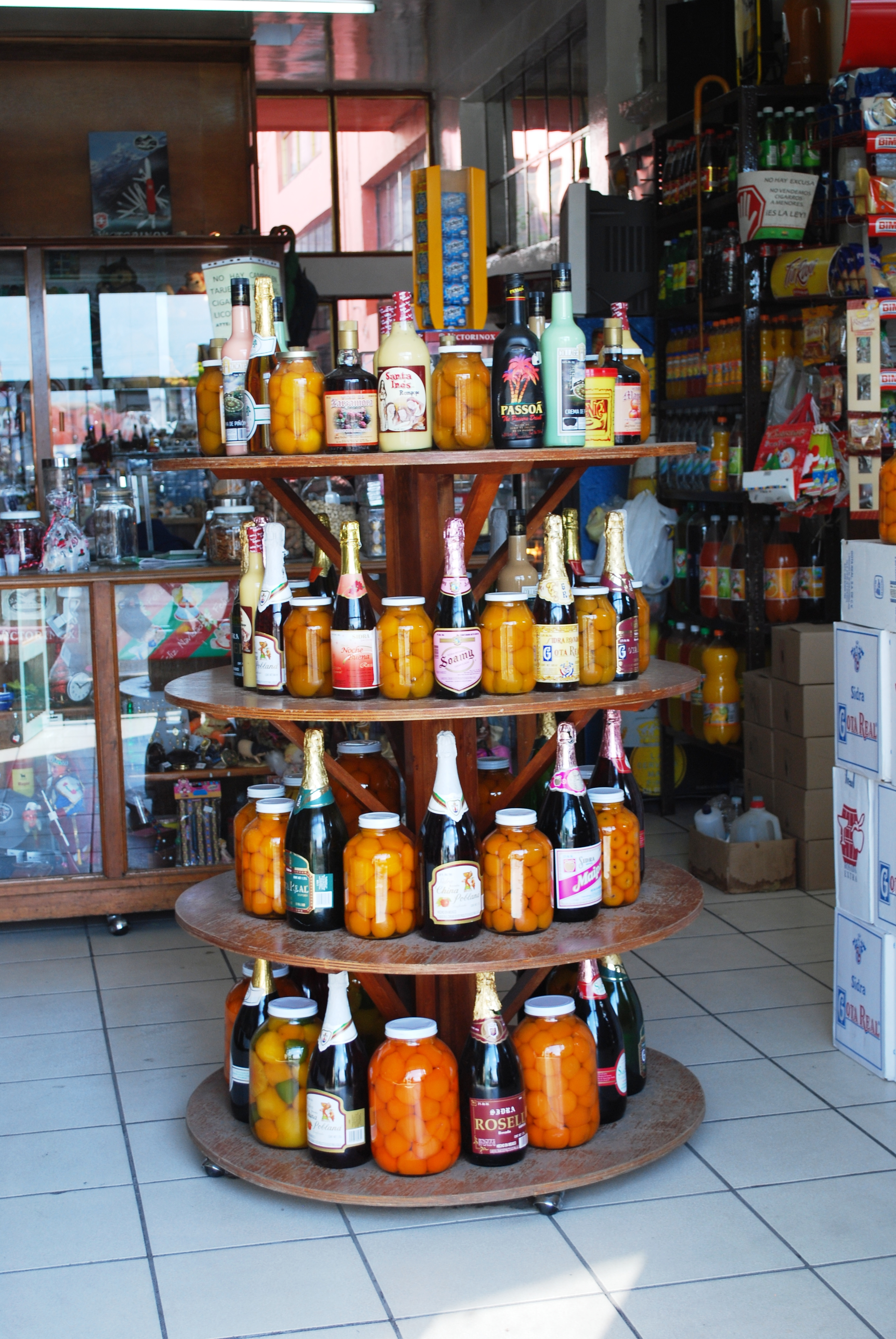
Display of locally produced cider and fruit preserves at a store in the city

Overall, the municipality is considered to have a low level of economic marginalization, with about one third of its community considered to have a high or somewhat high level. The major economic activity in Huejotzingo is agriculture, followed by industry. Agriculture, forestry and fishing employ about 39% of the municipality's population. Principal crops include fava and other kinds of beans, wheat, alfalfa, walnuts, and various fruits such as pears, plums, apricots, peaches, and tejocotes. The municipality contains a large number of fruit orchards, and much of the fruit is sold as preserves. Livestock includes dairy and meat cattle, pigs, goats, sheep, horses, and domestic fowl. Deforestation has significantly diminished the forestry industry, and it is minimal. There is a reservoir by the name of San Joaquin and a pond named San Mateo that is stocked with fish. Trout are raised on farms along the Alseseca and Xopana rivers.

About 31% of the population of Huejotzingo is involved in manufacturing, mining, and construction. The traditional industries of the area are the making of alcoholic apple cider and fruit conserves and sweets. Cider has been made in the municipality since 1920, when its production was started by Miguel Ortega y Rojas. There are five major cider production facilities, which produce about a million and a half bottles of the beverage each year. The city used to be surrounded by apple orchards, but the construction of the airport destroyed most of them. Most apples for cider production now come from an area called Salvador El Seco. The municipality has a growing industrial corridor by the name of Quetzalcoatl, along Federal Highway 190 between kilometer marks 74 and 91. It consists of four sections, which are developed as new businesses move in. The first is dedicated to metals, machinery, construction, and food processing. The second and third are still untouched brushland with plans for auto parts manufacturing in the future, and the fourth is primarily for the pharmaceutical industry. Mining is limited to the extraction of clay.

About 28% of the population is involved in tourism, commerce, and services. Most commercial businesses serve local and regional needs, but they also include shops selling the area's signature cider and fruit conserves. The municipality receives a certain amount of tourism principally due to the monastery with its museum and its annual carnival.

== History ==
The name comes from the Nahuatl Huexotzinco and means "place of small willows," as the area used to be filled with willow trees growing in area bogs and marshes. This area on the slopes of Iztaccíhuatl was settled first by groups of Olmeca-Xicallancas and later by Toltecs and Chichimecas. At first a group of villages, Huejotzingo later coalesced into a dominion or altepetl. According to Ixtlilxochitl, the rulers of Huejotzingo were descended from the Acolhua dynasty of Coatlinchan, and they were considered Chichimec descendants. Their patron deity was Camaxtli, typical of the Chichimeca. Though Nahuatl was the main language, there was also a minority of ethnic Otomi in the area. Between the 13th and 14th centuries, this dominion reached its peak, entering into treaties with the Aztec cities of Tenochtitlan, Tlacopan and Texcoco as well as those in Tlaxcala, and with both areas, it entered into the Xochiyaotl (Flower wars) to obtain victims for human sacrifice. According to one story, the lord of Huejotzingo protected both Moctezuma Ilhuicamina and the Nezahualcoyotl, who were being chased by the Tepanecas. When the two became rulers of Tenochtitlan and Texcoco, respectively, they never forgot the favor. The pre-Hispanic Huejotzingo was located on high ground closer to the Iztaccihuatl volcano, possibly because of the ready supply of water and possibly because of its defensible position. The area came under Aztec domination in the 15th century, but the people's relationship with the empire was poor. When the Spanish arrived, they broke Huejotzingo's ties to Tenochtitlan, and the town decided to ally itself with the Spanish against the Aztecs in 1520.

After the Conquest, the area became the encomienda of Diego de Ordaz. A short time later, it came under direct control of the viceroy. The Franciscans established a monastery in 1525, which was one of several early prominent ones along with those in Texcoco and Tlaxcala. The head of this monastery, Juan de Alameda, moved the pre-Hispanic settlement of Huejotzingo, resettling the population around the monastery, the current location of the city. The moved settlement was organized into four neighborhoods, one on each side of the monastery. Huejotzingo received its coat of arms in 1553 from Carlos V. It shows a silver fortress on a red field, which has a blue flag with the Cross of Jerusalem in gold. There is also a palm tree in gold. On either side of the fortress, there are two lions. Surrounding all of this is a decorative border with five blue stars on a silver background, with the words "Carolus Quintus Hispaniarum Rex" (Latin: Charles V, King of the Spanish). The first civil construction was the "portales," a commercial area and a government building. A textile industry was also established. The indigenous community protested the annual levy of tribute in 1560. Despite a census of 11,328 indigenous, the Spanish Crown demanded payment equal to a population of 25,000. However, the town lost and was forced to pay. Documentation of the excessive "taxes paid by the 21 districts of Huexotzingo between 1571 and 1577" appears in the 1578 Chavero Codex of Huexotzingo, written in the Nahuatl language.

Much of the area's political history is dominated by caciques and caudillos, who ruled through force and/or political connections, generally stifling the economic growth of the area. The appendage of de Nieva was added in 1861 in honor of Ignacio Nieva, who died fighting in the Reform War era in Texmelucan. The cemetery was established in the Barrio del Carmen in 1899.

For most of the 20th century, the municipal presidents came from one party, the Partido Revolucionario Institucional (PRI), and two local families, which rejected industrialization and the building of highways. In November 1995, elections for municipal president were held between Jesus Mensus of the PAN party and Miguel Angel Martinez Escobar of the then-nationally ruling PRI party. The PAN candidate received the largest number of votes, but PRI asserted that there were irregularities at eleven polling stations. The state electoral commission nullified the votes at these stations, which then allowed the PRI to win by 28 votes. Mensus supporters then occupied the municipal palace as talks between the two political parties broke down. In May, the PAN and the protests resulted in a reconsideration of the election commission's decision and PAN was declared the winner.

== Geography ==
Huejotzingo is located on the slopes of the Sierra Nevada, 25 km northwest from the capital on Highway 150. The geography of the land varies depending on the proximity to the Sierra Nevada. Areas at altitudes under 2,500 masl on the far east side are part of the Valley of Puebla, more specifically the plains of Huejotzingo. Between 2,500 and 3,000 m a.s.l. are the lower slopes of the Sierra Nevada, and above this on the far west side, the territory is part of the mountain chain and the Trans-Mexican Volcanic Belt. The east side of the municipality is flat. Heading west, the land begins to rise gradually in the middle of the territory, then the altitude increases sharply on the west end, as it is the foot of the Iztaccíhuatl volcano. Near this volcano, there are a number of other elevations such as Ocotepec, Tepechichipa and Zacatalatla. The steepness of the Iztaccíhuatl volcano makes it prone to rockslides as snowmelt runs down the side, especially from a depression on the side where snow tends to accumulate, called Ayolócotl. Visible along various areas of the volcano are areas devoid of vegetation where rockslides have violently disrupted the ecology.

=== Hydrography ===
The municipality belongs to the upper basin of the Atoyac River, one of the most important basins of the state, where the river begins at the border between Mexico State and Puebla on the east side of the Sierra Nevada. Rivers and streams generally cross the area from southwest to northwest, coming from the Sierra Nevada, and all are tributaries of the Atoyac. These include the San Diego, Cuaxupila, Pipinahuac, Alseseca, Achipitzil, Tolimpa, Losa Cipreses, Actiopa, and Xopanac. Some of these rivers and streams have suffered reduced water flow due to deforestation. Today the Xopana River is mostly dry, and filled with garbage in places. Some of the rivers have cut deep ravines and small canyons into the landscape, including the La Manga, Xeniqui, Ocoxaltepec, Xacatiotlapa, Hueyatitla, Tepetla, Coxocoaco, Apitzato, and Hueacaclán. The snowmelt of the volcanos feeds most of these streams and rivers, and water and snow stored in depressions on the mountain allow for river flow during the dry season. In addition, rain and snowmelt feed underground aquifers and freshwater springs.

=== Climate ===
The climate of the municipality divides into three zones. The lower valley areas have a temperate semi-humid climate with rains in the summer. A somewhat cold and semi-humid climate with rains in the summer predominates at the foothills of the Sierra Nevada. On the upper slopes of the volcano, the climate is cold.

=== Flora ===
Similarly, vegetation divides into three zones. The low flat areas are all given over to farmland and urban areas. The foothills area is generally characterized by forests of pine, holm oak, and oyamel, with areas of brush land, but much of this area is being deforested and converted into new farmland. The upper slopes of Iztaccíhuatl are characterized by snowy rocky land with areas of alpine meadow.

== The municipality ==
The small city of Huejotzingo is the local governing authority for over one hundred other named communities, which cover a territory of 188.91 km2. The municipality is located in the center west of the state, on the border with the State of Mexico. The municipality borders the municipalities of San Salvador el Verde, San Felipe Teotlalcingo, Chautzingo, Domingo Arenas, San Nicolás de los Ranchos, Calpan, Tlaltenango, Juan C. Bonilla, San Martín Texmelucan with the State of Mexico on the west side. Other major communities in the municipality include Santa María Atexcal, San Mateo Capultitlan, San Luis Coyotzingo, Santa María Nepopulaco, San Juan Pancuac, Santa María Tianguistengo, San Miguel Tianguizolco, and Santa Ana Xalmimilulco. There are municipal offices in the following communities: San Juan Pancoac, San Miguel Tianguizolco, San Luis Coyotzingo, Santa Ana Xalmimilulco, San Mateo Capultitlan, Santa Maria Atexcac, Santa Maria Nepopualco, and Santa Maria Tianguistenco.

Festivals include the Feria Regional de Huejotzingo in September, Feria del Santuario de la Preciosa Sangre on the fourth Friday of Lent in Santa Ana Xalmimilulco, and the feasts of the patron saints of the following communities: Santa Ana Xalmimilulco (26 July), San Luis Coyotzingo (19 August), San Mateo Capultitlan (21 September), San Miguel Tianguizolco (29 September), Santa Maria Tianguiztenco (12 May), Santa Maria Nepopualco (5 August), San Juan Pancoac (24 June), and Santa Maria Atexcac (20 January).

Just under 40% of the total municipal population of 59,822 lives in the city proper. Since 1995, the municipality has experienced population growth of about 2.77%. The overwhelming majority are Roman Catholic, with the next largest group, Evangelical/Protestant, accounting for 4.4% of the population. There are a number of Nahua families, with 725 speaking an indigenous language according to the 2005 census.

== Education ==
The municipally has 25 preschools, 21 primary schools, ten middle schools, and four high-school-level institutions. There is also a CECATI technical and vocational school. There is one major institution of higher education called the Universidad Tecnológica de Huejotzingo, which was established in the community of Santa Ana Xalmimilulco in 1998. The institution primarily offers technology-related degrees in fields such as mechanical engineering, information and communications technologies, administration and evaluation of projects, and textile industry design and production.

== Transportation ==
The International Airport of Puebla is located in the municipality, 20 minutes by highway from the city of Puebla and an hour from Mexico City. Its official name is the Aeropuerto Internacional de Puebla Hermanos Serdán. Inaugurated in 1985, the airport is one of the newest in Mexico and serves primarily the Puebla and Tehuacán regions. Most flights in and out are domestic with some international service, mostly to the United States. It served 550,000 passengers in 2009. The major airline to operate out of the facility is Volaris. In total there are six that provide service to Monterrey, Guadalajara, and Tijuana along with Houston and Dallas in the U.S. Buses and taxis connect the airport to the city of Puebla, as well as rental cars. There is parking for 230 cars, but no hotel on the premises.

== See also ==
- Huexotzinco Codex
