= Yolanda Lastra =

Mexican linguist (born 1932)

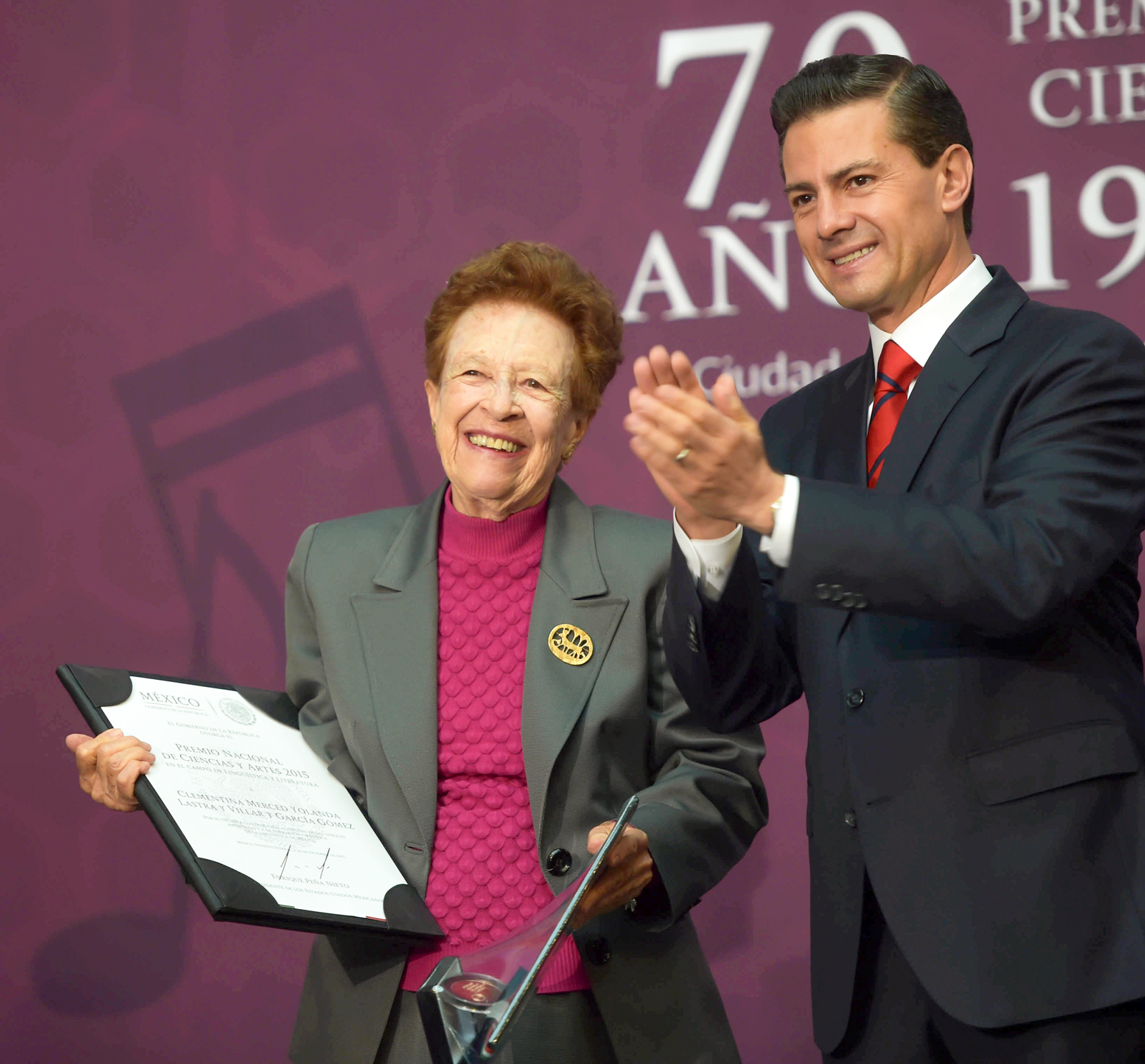
- Lastra receiving a Science and Art National Prize in 2015
- Born: 1932 (age 93–94)
- Education: Cornell University
- Occupation: Linguist
- Spouse: Jorge A. Suárez

Yolanda Lastra de Suárez (born 1932) is a Mexican linguist specializing in the descriptive linguistics of the indigenous languages of Mexico. She obtained her PhD degree in 1963 from Cornell University, her dissertation written under the guidance of Charles F. Hockett treating the syntax of Cochabamba Quechua in Bolivia. She was married to Argentinian linguist Jorge A. Suárez (1927-1985).

Lastra has worked with linguistic documentation and dialectology of the Nahuatl and Otomi languages and is recognized as a leading authority in the studies of Oto-Pamean languages in general. Her 1986 book Áreas dialectales del Náhuatl moderno is the single most comprehensive work on the dialectology of modern Nahuatl ever published.

Lastra is currently a senior investigator at the Institute of Anthropology at Universidad Nacional Autonoma de México. Since May 2014 she is a full member of the Academia Mexicana de la Lengua, the Mexican Language Academy.

== Selected published works ==
Lastra's published works include:

- — (2000). "Otomí language shift and some recent efforts to reverse it". In Fishman, Joshua (ed.). Can threatened languages be saved? Reversing Language Shift, Revisited: A 21st Century Perspective. Multilingual Matters Ltd. ISBN 1-85359-492-X.
- — (2001). Unidad y diversidad de la lengua. Relatos otomíes (in Spanish). Universidad Nacional Autonoma de México, Instituto de investigaciones Antropológicas. ISBN 968-36-9509-4.
- — (1998). Ixtenco Otomí. Lincom. ISBN 3-929075-15-6.
- Lastra, Yolanda (2006). Los Otomies - Su lengua y su historia (in Spanish). Universidad Nacional Autonoma de México, Instituto de investigaciones Antropológicas. ISBN 978-970-32-3388-5.
- — (1992). El Otomí de Toluca (in Spanish). Universidad Nacional Autonoma de México, Instituto de investigaciones Antropológicas. ISBN 968-36-2260-7.
- — (1989). Otomi de San Andrés Cuexcontitlan, Estado de México (PDF) (in Spanish). Archivo de Lenguas Indígenas. ISBN 968-12-0411-5.
- — (1996). "Verbal Morphology of Ixtenco Otomi" (PDF). Amerindia. 21: 1–8. Archived from the original (PDF) on 2011-07-18.
- — (1986). Las áreas dialectales del náhuatl moderno. Serie antropológica, no. 62 (in Spanish). Ciudad Universitaria, México, D.F.: Universidad Nacional Autónoma de México, Instituto de Investigaciones Antropológicas. ISBN 968-837-744-9. OCLC 19632019.
- — (1984). "Chichimeco Jonaz". In Munro S. Edmonson (Volume ed.), with Patricia A. Andrews (ed.). Supplement to the Handbook of Middle American Indians, Vol. 2: Linguistics. Victoria Reifler Bricker (General Editor). Austin: University of Texas Press. pp. 20–43. ISBN 0-292-77593-8. OCLC 10207920.

== External sources ==
- Hill, Jane H. (1989). "Review: [untitled]". Language. 65 (1). Washington, DC: Linguistic Society of America: 129–135. doi:10.2307/414848. ISSN 0097-8507. JSTOR 414848. OCLC 1361911.
- Martín Butragueño, Pedro. "Lingüística descriptiva y lingüística social en la obra de Yolanda Lastra: Historia de un compromiso científico" (PDF). In Martha Ruth Islas Canales (ed.). Entre las lenguas indígenas, la sociolingüística y el español: estudios en homenaje a Yolanda Lastra (in Spanish). Zapopan, Mex.: El Colegio de Jalisco. Archived from the original (PDF) on 2009-03-27.
