= Huexotzinco Codex =

Colonial-era Nahua pictorial manuscript

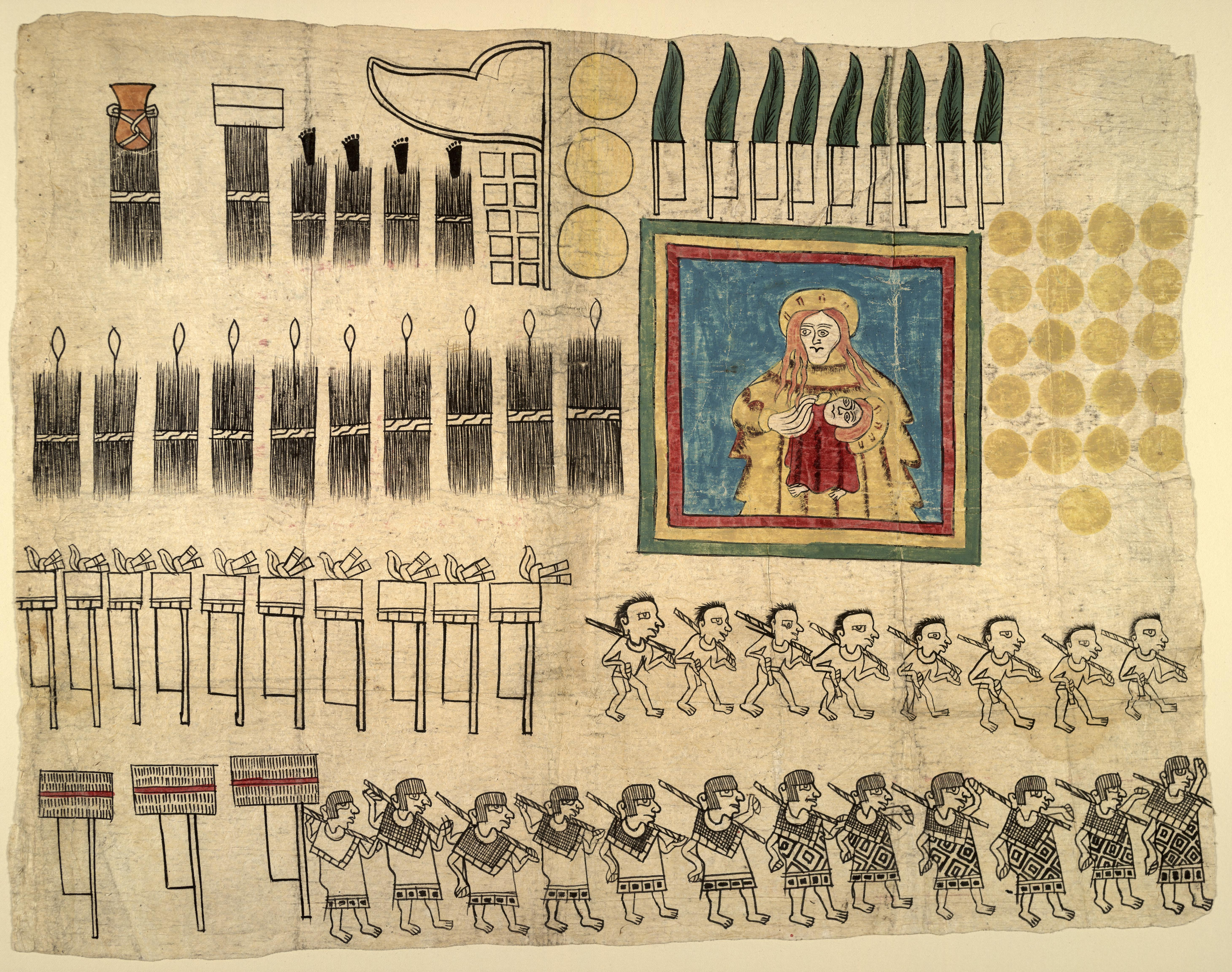
Panel 1 of the Codex; the panel contains an image of the Virgin and Child and symbolic representations of tribute paid to the administrators

The Huexotzinco Codex or Huejotzingo Codex is a colonial-era Nahua pictorial manuscript, one of the group of manuscripts collectively known as Aztec codices. It is an eight-sheet document on amatl, a pre-European paper made in Mesoamerica, and consists of part of the testimony in a legal case against members of the First Audiencia (high court) in Mexico, particularly its president, Nuño de Guzmán, ten years after the 1521 Spanish conquest.

== Content ==
Huexotzinco, now known as Huejotzingo, is a town southeast of Mexico City, in the state of Puebla. In 1521, the Nahua Indian people of the town were the allies of the Spanish conqueror Hernán Cortés, and together they confronted their enemies to overcome Moctezuma, leader of the Aztec Empire. Cortés's indigenous allies from Tlaxcala were more successful than those Huejotzinco in translating that alliance into privileges in the colonial era, and the Huejotzincans petitioned the crown for such privileges. A 1560 petition to the crown in Nahuatl outlines their participation.

After the conquest, the Huexotzinco peoples became part of Cortés's encomienda holdings. While Cortés was out of Mexico from 1529 to 1530, the First Audiencia intervened in the daily activities of the community and forced the Nahuas to pay excessive taxes in the form of goods and services. When Cortés returned, the Nahuas of Huejotzinco joined him in a legal case against the abuses of the First Audiencia.

The Huexotzinco Codex has testimony enumerating the abuses by Nuño de Guzmán when he took over the encomienda in the name of the crown. Indigenous supporting Cortés's lawsuit claimed that Guzmán extracted large amounts of tributes from the town, but also that they were compelled to serve Guzmán as he went to war. Several indigenous witnesses testified to the fact that the lord of Huextzinco was compelled to participate, but that until a horse was procured for him he refused to serve. At this time horses were very expensive, since they were not native to the New World and at the end of the 1520s likely there were few born locally. The horse, according to the testimony of one Esteban, previously named Tochel (or Tochtli, "rabbit"), cost "twenty-one small gold ingots." Esteban also says that for the 600 men outfitted for war, the cost was 27,000 pieces of cloth.

Although the plaintiffs were initially successful in their suit in Mexico, it was appealed to the Council of the Indies in Spain. Documents attesting to the final outcome of the suit were unavailable for many years. A document later uncovered in the collections of the Library of Congress shows that in 1538, Charles I of Spain agreed with the judgement against the Spanish administrators and ruled that two-thirds of all tributes taken from the people of Huexotzinco be returned.

== Later research ==
The codex was part of the private archive belonging to the descendants of Cortés (the Italian dukes of Monteleone) until 1925. Edward Harkness purchased the codex from the rare book dealer, A.S.W. Rosenbach, and presented it to the Library of Congress in 1928–29.

Of particular interest on the Huexotzinco Codex is the image of the Virgin Mary, one of the earliest indigenous depictions. The Indigenous men's testimony was rendered in Nahuatl and translated to Spanish for the lawsuit. Their statements indicate that the Madonna image in the codex shows the banner that Guzmán demanded as a standard for the campaign to conquer what became New Galicia. Made of gold and richly decorated with feathers, the Huexotzincans had to sell twenty slaves to indigenous merchants and received in payment three gold ingots and nine long feathers (likely quetzal feathers, highly prized by the Indians). According to the testimony of one Lucas, formerly known as Tamavaltetle, an indigenous lord of Huexotzinco, the image of the Virgin was "broad and as long as more than half an arm."

Scholars have analyzed the codex and described what each stylized glyph means. On the page with the image of the banner of the Virgin Mary, the decipherments indicate the costs of the banner and the goods rendered for the campaign. On the top left, the pot at the top of a bundle of reeds is 400 pots of liquid amber. Next to it with a bundle of reeds and a divided rectangle is the depiction of "400 small [cotton] mantles to purchase food en route." The four reed bundles and 10 small squares depict 1,600 pairs of sandals for the warriors in Guzmán's campaign. The flag or banner is for the Huexotzincan lord, Don Tomé to carry, which cost "10 loads of small mantles at 20 per load." The three discs are "fine gold plaques used in the standard of the Madonna." The nine flags with the stylized feathers depict nine bundles of quetzal feathers, each containing 20 feathers at a "cost of 9 loads of 20 mantles each." The image of the Virgin Mary was the standard for Guzmán, "(About 16" x 16", gold leaf, One of the earliest native productions related to Catholicism.)" To the left of the Madonna banner are 10 bundles of 400 darts, i.e., 4,000 metal tipped darts for the campaign. The discs to the right of the image of the Madonna depict were the gold or silver to purchase the horse for Don Tomé. On the next line down, the 10 stylized flags depict 200 loads of loincloths for the warriors. The 8 men on that same line are the male slaves sold to Indian merchants for the gold for the Madonna standard. At the bottom of the page, the three stylized flags with large rectangles at their tops are 60 leather covered chests. There are two groups of 6 women, dressed distinctively, which are the female slaves "sold to pay for the gold for the Madonna banner."
