= Flower war =

Ritual war fought between the Aztec Triple Alliance and its enemies (1454–1519)

Flower War
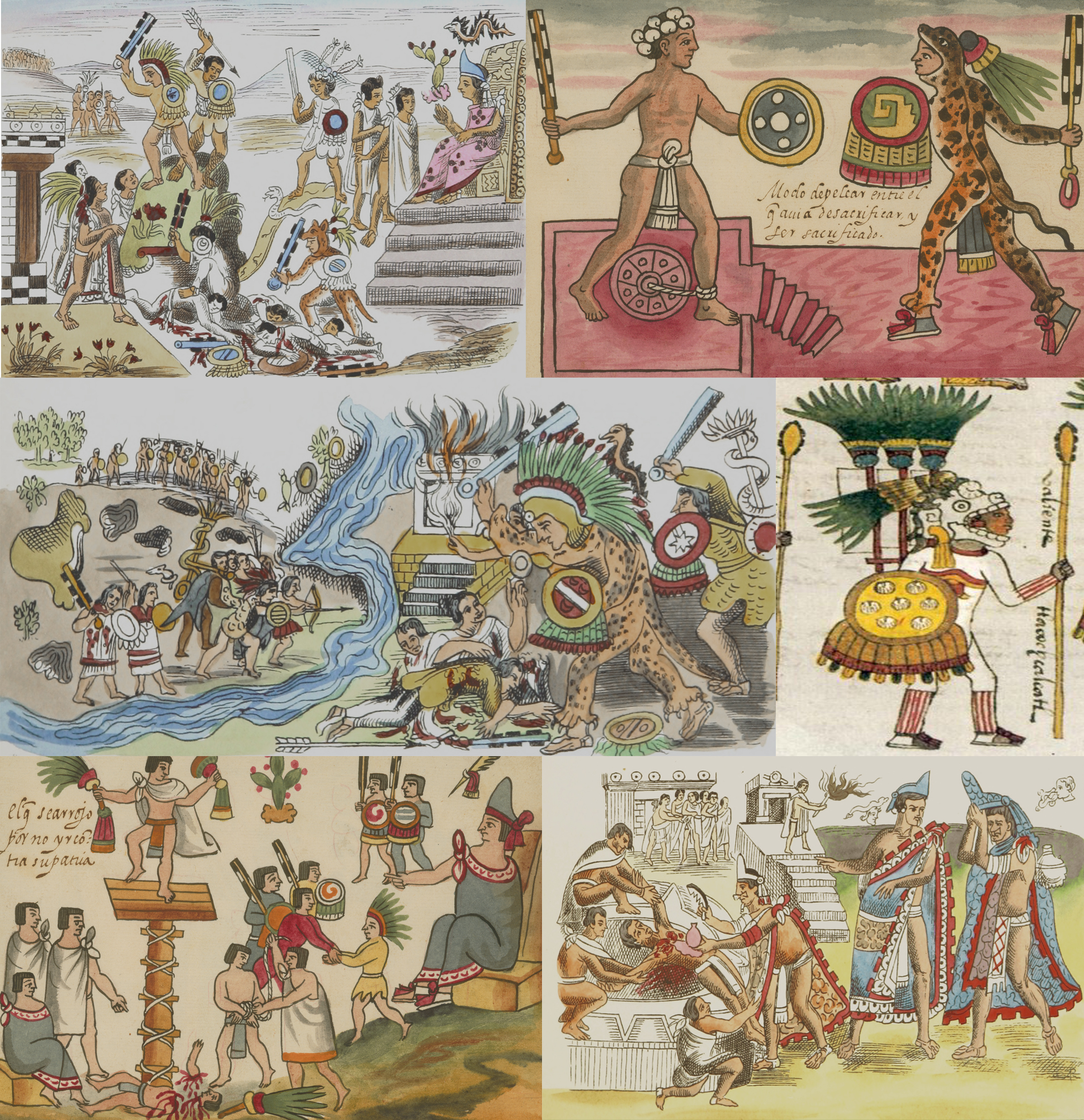
Date	1454 – 1519 (65 Years)
Location	Central Mexico
Result	Subsumed by the Spanish conquest of the Mexica: Cholula and Atlixco incorporated into the Mexica Tlaxcala and Huejotzingo lose trade routes

Belligerents
Mexica	Tlaxcala	Cholula	Huejotzingo	Atlixco

A flower war or flowery war (Nahuatl languages: xōchiyāōyōtl, Spanish: guerra florida) was a ritual war fought intermittently between the Aztec Triple Alliance and its enemies on and off for many years in the vicinity and the regions around the capital city of Tenochtitlan, probably ending with the arrival of the Spaniards in 1519. Enemies included the city-states of Tlaxcala, Huejotzingo, and Cholula in the Tlaxcala-Pueblan Valley in central Mexico. In these wars, participants would fight according to a set of conventions.

During the Spanish conquest of the Aztec Empire, Tlaxcala allied with the Spaniards against the Aztecs, being eager to see their longtime flower war enemies overthrown.

== Origins ==
Texcocan nobleman Ixtlilxochitl gives the "fullest early statement concerning the origin as well as the initial rationale" of the flower war. From 1450 to 1454, the Aztecs had suffered from crop failure and severe drought; this led to famine and many deaths in the central Mexican highlands. Ixtlilxochitl reports that the flower war began "as a response" to the famine: "the priests ... of Mexico [Tenochtitlan] said that the gods were angry at the empire, and that to placate them it was necessary to sacrifice many men, and that this had to be done regularly." Thus, Tenochtitlan (the Aztec capital), Texcoco, Tlaxcala, Cholula, and Huejotzingo agreed to engage in flower war for the purpose of obtaining human sacrifices for the gods. However, scholars such as Frederic Hicks disagree with using Ixlilxochitl's writings as the origin story of the flower war, due to Ixtlilxochitl not specifically mentioning "flower war" and being the only known source to record these events.

== Practice ==
Flower wars differed from typical wars in a number of important aspects. In typical Aztec warfare, the main objectives were political, religious, and socioeconomic. The flower war was a secondary type of warfare that was practiced by the Aztecs and differed from typical warfare. While engaging in a flower war, competing armies would meet on a "preset date at a preselected place". These places became sacred sites and were called cuauhtlalli or yaotlalli. Combatants signaled the start of war by burning a large "pyre of paper and incense" between the armies. Actual battle tactics also differed from typical warfare. In typical warfare, the Aztecs used atlatl darts, stones, and other ranged weapons to weaken enemy forces from afar. However, in flower wars, the Aztecs did not use ranged weapons and instead used weapons such as the macuahuitl that required skill and close proximity to the enemy. The use of these kinds of weapons allowed the Aztecs to display their individual combat ability, which was an important part of the flower war.

Flower wars involved fewer soldiers than typical Aztec wars did. A larger proportion of the soldiers would be drawn from nobility than during a typical war. These characteristics allowed the Aztecs to engage in flower wars during any time of the year. In contrast, the Aztecs could fight larger wars of conquest only from late autumn to early spring, because Aztec citizens were needed for farming purposes during the rest of the year. Additionally, flower wars differed from typical wars in that there were equal numbers of soldiers on each side of the battle; this was also related to the Aztecs wanting to show off their military prowess. They had the ability to participate in small warfare more frequently than others so it was used as practice to prepare their warriors for typical warfare.

Flower wars were generally less lethal than typical wars, but a long-running flower war could become increasingly deadly over time. For example, in a long-running flower war between the Aztecs and the Chalcas, there were few battle deaths at the start. After time had passed, captured commoners started to be killed, but captured nobles were frequently released; sacrifice was not always the fate of captives. However, after further time had passed, captive nobles were killed along with the commoners. This increased the cost of the flower war for both the Aztecs and the Chalcas. The Aztecs considered flower war death to be more noble than dying in a typical war; this can be seen in the word for a flower war death, xochimiquiztli, which translates to "flowery death, blissful death, fortunate death". Further, the Aztecs thought that their own warriors who died in a flower war would be transported to the heaven where Huitzilopochtli (the supreme god of sun, fire, and war) lived.

== Purpose ==
The prominence of Aztec warfare stems from their understanding of mythology. According to Caroline Dodds Pennock, a historian from the University of Sheffield, the Aztecs followed the orders of their god of war, Huitzilopochtli, telling the people of Tenochtitlan that they were able to migrate only through war, making their view of their own culture as well as the rest of the world based on warfare. This aspect of their society was so important that the majority of their music revolved around the flowery metaphors, as well as comparing the warriors to multiple types of prominent birds, holding these warriors, and by proxy these wars, to such high esteem, forever cementing their legacy in Aztec society.

With religion being so important to Aztec society, going as far to shape the politics of their society itself, it makes sense that a large part of these flower wars would be to appease their gods, especially Huitzilopochtli, as he was not only their god of war, but also the patron of the state. By extending this devotion to their gods so that the Aztec could make Tenochtitlan the strong capital that they were promised it to be, they are said to have taken many people to be sacrificed in their name, as the Aztec believed that as part of balancing life in the cosmos, they had to give the Earth blood, similarly to their belief that the gods gave their blood to create humans. The Aztec were also not the only people in the Valley of Mexico known to practice these rituals, losing members of their own society to the ones around them in the same way that the Aztec would take prisoners to be sacrificed, and they even believed that being sacrificed themselves was an honor and a distinguished way to die.

Historians have thought that flower wars were fought for purposes including combat training and capturing humans for religious sacrifice. Historians note evidence of the sacrifice motive: one of Cortez's captains, Andres de Tapia, once asked Moctezuma II why the stronger Aztec Empire had not yet conquered the nearby state of Tlaxcala outright. The emperor responded by saying that although they could have if they had wanted to, the Aztecs had not done so because war with Tlaxcala was a convenient way of gathering sacrifices and training their own soldiers. However, scholars such as Frederic Hicks question that the main purpose of the flower war was to gain sacrifices. Tlaxcalan historian Muñoz Camargo noted that the Aztecs would often besiege Tlaxcalan towns and cut off trade, which was uncharacteristic of a typical flower war. For this reason, proponents of Hicks' idea believe that the Aztecs did want to conquer the Tlaxcalans, but that they simply could not for some reason.

Despite many scholars' doubts about the sacrifice motive of the flower war, Hicks asserts that Moctezuma II's explanations of the flower war (gaining sacrifices and combat training) were logical, given that the Aztecs did place a heavy importance on both sacrifice and martial ability. Fighting in actual warfare was a mandatory part of training for warriors of the noble class, and it was heavily encouraged for warriors of lower classes as well. Given these factors, Hicks suggests that Moctezuma II's stated reasons may have been genuine and not just an excuse for military failure.

However, some scholars have suggested that the flower war served purposes beyond gaining sacrifices and combat training. For example, Hassig states that for the Aztecs, "flower wars were an efficient means of continuing a conflict that was too costly to conclude immediately." As such, a purpose of these wars was to occupy and wear down the enemy's fighting force. By requiring an equal number of soldiers on each side, the Aztecs made the battle seem balanced at first; however, the side with fewer overall troops suffered more because the losses comprised a greater percentage of their total forces. Through this, the Aztecs used the flower wars to weaken their opponents. Furthermore, since fewer soldiers took part in flower war as compared to a traditional war, the practice of flower war allowed the Aztecs to hold a potential threat at bay while focusing the bulk of their forces elsewhere.

Another purpose of the flower war, according to Hassig, was to show the superiority of Aztec troops. This was another reason that equal numbers of troops were used. If the Aztecs tried to use numerical superiority, their enemy would resort to the kind of defensive tactics that the Aztecs had trouble fighting against. With equal numbers, the enemy would fight the Aztecs on the open field, where individual soldiers had a greater chance of showing off their martial ability. Finally, according to Hassig, "propaganda was perhaps the most significant purpose of flower wars." By engaging their opponents in the flower war, the Aztecs were able to continuously showcase their force, which warned other city-states about their power. If the Aztecs made enough of a show of force, it could encourage the allies of the Aztec's enemies to change their allegiance.

== See also ==
- Star war
