= Handbook of South American Indians =

Reference book on indigenous peoples

The Handbook of South American Indians is a monographic series of edited scholarly and reference volumes in ethnographic studies, published by the Smithsonian Institution between 1940 and 1947.

In 1932, Baron Erland Nordenskiöld agreed to edit the series for the National Research Council Division of Anthropology and Psychology; however, he died that year. The Smithsonian Institution agreed to sponsor the series but adequate funds were not approved by US Congress until 1940. Julian Steward edited the series. Ultimately, over a hundred scholars from Latin America, the United States, and Europe contributed and provided advice for the series.

This six-volume series, with an additional index volume, documents information about Indigenous peoples of South America, including cultural and physical aspects of the people, language family, history, and prehistory. This is a reference work for historians, anthropologists, other scholars, and the general reader. The series utilizes noted authorities for each topic. The set is illustrated, indexed, and has extensive bibliographies. Volumes may be purchased individually.

Paul Radin reviewed the first four volumes, generally giving a favorable evaluation, but noting that the volumes are a "compromise between a handbook and a textbook." Radin criticizes the relative neglect of religion as a topic, as well as the neglect of functional aspects of indigenous cultures. He highly praises the inclusion of the cultures of the indigenous in the Southern Cone, which is new in the anthropological literature. He also esteems the article on Andean civilizations, while deeming the volume on the circum-Caribbean groups the weakest.

== Bibliographic information ==
Handbook of South American Indians / Julian H. Steward, General Editor. Washington, DC: Smithsonian Institution, 1940-1947.

== Volume 1: The Marginal Tribes ==
Steward, Julian H., ed. (1946), The Marginal Tribes, Washington, DC: Smithsonian Institution, p. 623

=== Sections ===
1. Indians of Southern South America
2. Indians of the Gran Chaco
3. The Indians of Eastern Brazil

== Volume 2: The Andean Civilizations ==
Steward, Julian H., ed. (1946), The Andean Civilizations, Washington, DC: Smithsonian Institution, p. 1935

== Volume 3: The Tropical Forest Tribes ==
Steward, Julian H., ed. (1948), The Tropical Forest Tribes, Washington, DC: Smithsonian Institution, p. 986

=== Sections ===
1. The Coastal and Amazonian Tupi
2. The Tribes of Mato Grosso and Eastern Bolivia
3. Tribes of the Montana and Bolivian East Andes
4. Tribes of the western Amazon Basin
5. Tribes of the Guianas and the Left Amazon Tributaries

== Volume 4: The Circum-Caribbean Tribes ==
Steward, Julian H., ed. (1948), The Circum-Caribbean Tribes, Washington, DC: Smithsonian Institution, p. 609

=== Sections ===
1. Central American Cultures
2. The Cultures of Northwest South America
3. The West Indies

== Volume 5: The Comparative Ethnology of South American Indians ==
Steward, Julian H., ed. (1949), The Comparative Ethnology of South American Indians, Washington, DC: Smithsonian Institution, p. 818

=== Sections ===
1. A Cross-Cultural Survey of South American Indian Tribes
2. Jesuit Missions in South America
3. The Native Populations of South America
4. South American Cultures: An Interpretative Summary

== Volume 6: Physical Anthropology, Linguistics and Cultural Geography of South American Indians ==
Steward, Julian H, ed. (1950). Physical Anthropology, Linguistics and Cultural Geography of South American Indians. Vol. 6. Washington, DC: Smithsonian Institution. p. 715.

=== Sections ===
1. Ancient Man
2. Physical Anthropology
3. The languages of South American Indians
4. Geography and Plant and Animal Resources

== Volume 7: Index ==
Steward, Julian H., ed. (1959), The Comparative Ethnology of South American Indians, Washington, DC: Smithsonian Institution, p. 286

== See also ==
- Handbook of North American Indians
- Handbook of Middle American Indians
- List of indigenous peoples of South America
