= Damago Soto =

The Reverend Damago Soto of Concordia, Vera Cruz, Mexico, was a minister who supposedly discovered the key to interpreting Aztec writings.
