= Emma Gregores =

Emma Mercedes Gregores (1927-2007) was an Argentine linguist specializing in the Guarani language. She graduated from the University of Buenos Aires, worked as Lecturer of Grammar and Linguistic Theory at the National University of La Plata, and researcher at CONICET.

Along with his husband Jorge A. Suárez, from 1959 to 1961 she finished a doctorate at Cornell University, studying with Charles Hockett. In 1968, they published a grammar of the Guaraní language.

== Selected works ==
- Gregores, E. (1974). “Informe sobre el estado de las lenguas indígenas de la Argentina”. Documento de Trabajo. Bs. As. CICE.
- Gregores, E. 1974: "Pautas para el relevamiento etnolingüístico". CICE (m.i.)
- Gregores, E., & Suarez, J. A. (1967). “A Description of Colloquial Guarani”. Janua Linguarum. Series Practical, XXVII.
- Gregores, E. (1966). Las raíces del pensamiento gramatical de Bello. “Estudios reunidos en conmemoración del centenario de su muerte”, 82-96.
- Hockett, Charles. 1965. “Curso de lingüística moderna”. Traducción de Emma Gregores y Jorge Suárez. Buenos Aires, EUDEBA.
- Gregores, E. (1953). El humanismo de Quevedo. “Anales de filología clásica”, (6), 91-105.
