= Jorge A. Suárez =

Argentine linguist (1927–1985)

- Born: 29 July 1927; Villa María, Argentina
- Died: 24 February 1985 (aged 57)
- Spouses: Emma Gregores; Yolanda Lastra

Academic background
- Education: Cornell University (PhD)
- Thesis: A description of colloquial Guaraní (1961)
- Doctoral advisor: Charles Hockett

Academic work
- Discipline: Linguist
- Institutions: National Autonomous University of Mexico

Jorge Alberto Suárez (29 July 1927 – 24 February 1985) was an Argentine linguist specializing in Mexican indigenous languages. He was born in Villa María in the province of Córdoba in Argentina, and was educated in Buenos Aires, first as a high school teacher. Along with his first wife, Emma Gregores, from 1959 to 1961 he finished a doctorate at Cornell University, studying with Charles Hockett. In 1968, he published his first book, a grammar of the Guaraní language, coauthored with Emma Gregores, a reworking of his doctoral dissertation. He subsequently taught in Argentina until 1969 when he moved to Mexico where he married Mexican linguist Yolanda Lastra, his second wife. In Mexico, he dedicated himself to the study of indigenous Mexican languages, working conjointly with his wife he carried out extensive dialectological surveys of Nahuatl and he conducted in-depth field work of the Tlapanec language (Me'phaa), writing the first full grammar of the language. In 1983 he published a widely influential book on Mesoamerican languages. He was also the editor of the monograph series Archivo de Lenguas Indígenas de México.

In Mexico he was affiliated with El Colegio de México (1969–1972), the department of linguistics at the Instituto Nacional de Antropología e Historia (1972–1975), the Universidad Nacional Autónoma de México (1975–1983) and again Colegio de México (1983–1984).

== Selected writings ==
- Jorge A Suárez and Emma Gregores. 1968. A description of colloquial Guarani. Hague: Mouton
- Jorge A. Suárez. 1974. South American Indian languages. Encyclopaedia Britannica, 15th edition, Macropaedia 17. 105–112.
- Jorge A. Suárez. 1983a. The Mesoamerican Indian Languages. Cambridge: Cambridge University Press.
- Jorge A. Suárez. 1983b. La lengua tlapaneca de Malinaltepec. México: UNAM.

== Bibliography ==
- Levy, Paulette (1990). "Introducción". In Beatriz Garza Cuarón; Paulette Levy (eds.). Homenaje a Jorge A. Suárez: lingüística indoamericana e hispánica. Vol. 18. Colegio de Mexico. pp. 11–22. ISBN 9789681204327. JSTOR j.ctv47w9zk.3.
