= Ronald Spores =

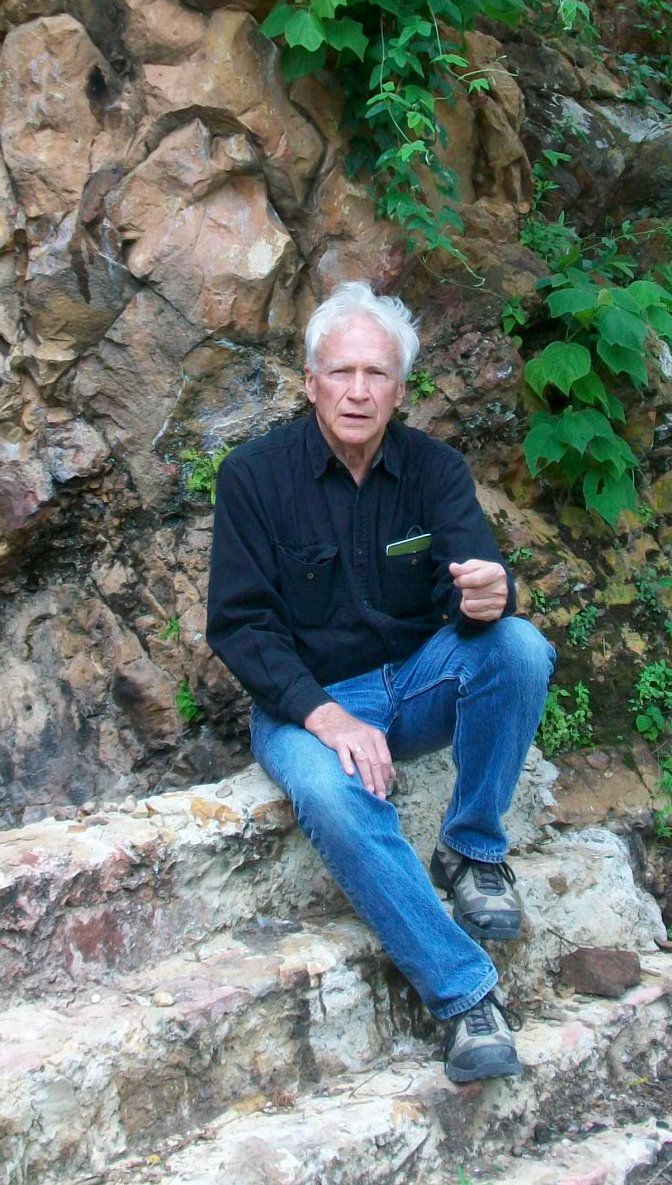
Ronald Spores in the Mixteca Area of Oaxaca, July, 2009

Ronald M. Spores (born January 25, 1931) is an American academic anthropologist, archaeologist and ethnohistorian, whose research career has centered on the pre-Columbian cultures of Mesoamerica. He is Professor Emeritus of anthropology at Vanderbilt University's College of Arts and Science, where he has been a faculty member for over four decades. Spores is most renowned for his scholarship conducted on the cultural history of the Oaxacan region in southwestern Mexico. In particular, he has made many contributions on the Mixtec culture, investigating its archaeological sites, ethnohistorical documents, political economies, and ethnohistory in both the pre-Columbian and Colonial eras. He was co-director of the Proyecto Arqueológico de la Ciudad Yucundaa Pueblo Viejo de Teposcolula, Oaxaca, sponsored by the Fundación Alfredo Harp Helu, the National Geographic Society, and INAH (2004–2010), and currently (2017) directs research on the sixteenth century Casa del Cacique de Yanhuitlan, Oaxaca, and related investigation of the surrounding Prehispanic-Colonial city and region. He is also Research Associate at the American Museum of Natural History, New York, and at the University of Oregon and investigator on the Proyecto Geoparque de la Mixteca Alta, Universidad Nacional Autónoma de México/UNESCO, centered at Yanhuitlan, Oaxaca (2016–2017). Recent research relates to the colonial Manila Galleon trade between the Philippines and Acapulco.

== Biography ==
Spores obtained his undergraduate Bachelor of Science degree from the University of Oregon in 1953. His graduate studies were undertaken at the Universidad de las Américas in Cholula, Mexico, where he obtained an M.A. in 1960. Spores continued graduate studies at Harvard, where he completed a Master's thesis in 1963 and his doctorate in anthropology in 1964.

== Published works ==
=== Authored books ===
Spores, Ronald and Andrew Balkansky (2013) The Mixtecs of Oaxaca: Ancient Times to the Present. Norman: University of Oklahoma Press.

- Spores, Ronald (2007). Ñuu Ñudzahui: La Mixteca de Oaxaca. Oaxaca: Instituto Estatal de Educación Pública del Estado de Oaxaca.
- Spores, Ronald (1984). The Mixtecs in Ancient and Colonial Times. Norman: University of Oklahoma Press.
- Spores, Ronald (1967). The Mixtec Kings and Their People. The Civilization of the American Indian series, no. 85. Norman: University of Oklahoma Press. OCLC 484409.

Spores, Ronald and Nelly Robles Garcia (eds.), Yucundaa. La Ciudad Mixteca y su Transformación Prehispánica-Colonial, México: INAH, 2015.

== Articles ==
- Spores, Ronald (2008). "Excavations at Yucundaa, Pueblo Viejo de Teposcolula". In Maarten Jansen; Laura van Broekhoven (eds.). Mixtec Writing and Society. Amsterdam: KNAW Press. pp. 253–285.
- Spores, Ronald; Robles García, Nelly (2008). "Investigaciones arqueológicas en Yucundaa, el Pueblo Viejo de Teposcolula, Oaxaca". Arqueología: 155–173.
- Spores, Ronald; Robles García, Nelly (2007). "A Prehispanic (Postclassic) Capital Center in Colonial Transition: Excavations at Yucundaa Pueblo Viejo de Teposcolula, Oaxaca, Mexico". Latin American Antiquity. 18 (3): 333–353. doi:10.2307/25478184. JSTOR 25478184. S2CID 161858514.
- Spores, Ronald (1965). "Zapotec and Mixtec at Spanish contact". In Gordon R. Willey (Volume ed.); Gordon Willey (eds.). Handbook of Middle American Indians, Vol. 2: Archaeology of Southern Mesoamerica, Part I. R. Wauchope (General Editor). Austin: University of Texas Press. pp. 962–987. ISBN 0-292-73260-0. OCLC 277126.
- Spores, Ronald (1998). "Differential Response to Colonial Control among the Mixtecs and Zapotecs of Oaxaca". In Susan Schroeder (ed.). Native Resistance and the Pax Colonial in New Spain. Lincoln: University of Nebraska Press. pp. 30–46. ISBN 0-8032-4266-2. OCLC 37499910.
