= Robert E. Lee Chadwick =

American anthropologist and archeologist

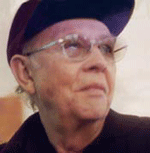
Robert E. Lee Chadwick PHD, 1974

Robert E. Lee Chadwick (March 29, 1930 – January 3, 2014) was an American anthropologist and archeologist, primarily known for his contributions to the Handbook of Middle American Indians.

== Career ==
Robert Chadwick obtained his Ph.D. in anthropology from Tulane University in 1974. His dissertation, directed by Professor Robert Wauchope, was titled The Archaeology of a New World "Merchant" Culture.

As a graduate student at the University of the Americas, he participated in excavations of three Period I tombs at Yagul. He went on to serve as an archeologist for the Tehuacan Archaeological-Botanical Project and as staff archeologist for the Mexican government's Teotihuacan project. Later, he taught at the University of Alberta, Calgary.

== Papers ==
His notable collection of works during his years of excavating and reconstruction at Teotihuacan and other sites contains articles, publications, analysis of the artifacts discovered, sketches, illustrations, photographs on pre-Columbian culture, and a significant catalog prepared by Chadwick of the stone, ceramic and semi-precious artifacts found in north-eastern Costa Rica.

Chadwick gave a number of his papers to Dr. Donald Robertson, of Tulane University. They were subsequently saved by his wife Martha Robertson, who recognized their value. She then turned most of them over to the Latin American Library; and the rest of the papers arrived following her death. Mr. Chadwick retired and died in New York City. His collection of unpublished articles is kept at the Latin American Library at Tulane University New Orleans, Louisiana. His last published essay was in 2013: The Olmeca-Xicallanca of Teotihuacan, Cacaxtla, and Cholula; An archaeological, ethnohistorical, and linguistic synthesis. Con una contribución de Angel García Cook, El Epiclásico en la región poblano-tlaxcalteca. Paris Monographs in American Archaeology 30. ISBN 978 1 4073 1102 9. BAR International Series S2488 Published by Hadrian Books Ltd., Oxford, England Available from: British Archaeological Reports, Oxford, England

=== Robert Chadwick Papers: 1964-2008 ===
Unpublished articles on pre-Columbian culture include:

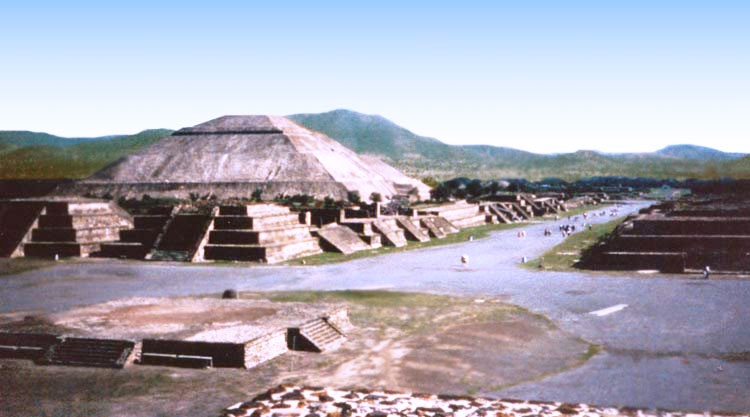
Avenue of the Dead, Teotihuacan, Mexico, 2nd Century A.D.

- Report on excavations at Teotihuacan with eight sketches and plans with illustrations and photographs that show the area at Teotihuacan excavated and reconstructed and some of the artifacts discovered dated 1964.
- Two-page report by Chadwick and Carlos Tirso Serna on "Plaza of the Pyramid of the Sun", Teotihuacan dated 1962.
- "The Ethnohistory of the Tehuacan Valley" by Robert Chadwick and R.S. Macneish. Photocopy of a typewritten paper, 109 pages date 1966.
- Analysis of the Standard Fruit and Steamship Company, New Orleans, Pre-Columbian Collection. Photocopy of a catalog prepared by Chadwick of the stone, ceramic and semi-precious artifacts found in north-eastern Costa Rica and studied by a professional archeologist, 43 pages dated 1969.
- "Toward a Theory of Trans-Atlantic Diffusion". Photocopy of a monograph in which Chadwick makes the case that there were several trans-Atlantic incursions to the New World prior to the European contact of the 16th century, 82 pages. There are nine letters of opinions on this monograph by various authorities to whom Chadwick had submitted copies for evaluation and suggestions about publication dated 1975.
- Notebook assembled from eleven separate unpublished articles written at various times and given the collective name "El fin del mundo clásico en el México & Central: los casos de Teotihuacan, Cholula, Xochicalco" pages are numbered consecutively and total 325. The articles are in typewritten, carbon, mimeographed, or photocopy dated 1979.
- "Identificación de los glifos de Cuitlahuac, Malinalco, Chalco en los códices mixtecos" dated 1967.
- "The Meaning of a Probable Eclipse in Codex Vindobonensis" dated 1967.
- "A reappraisal of the Fall of Teotihuacan" an abstract dated 1965.
- "A Possible Pre-Columbian origin of the La Llorona tale" dated 1967.
- "Rethinking the Quetzalcoatl Myth" dated 1968.
- "The Possible Origin of the Mexican Feast called Ochpaniztli" dated 1968.
- "Identificacion de los glifos de Cuitlahuac, Malinalco, Chalco en los códices mixtecos" dated 1967.
- "Un posible glifo de Cholula en el Códice Nuttall. Identificación de los lugares Craneo Excremento".
- "Story of the 8 Deer Family" dated 1966.
- "A Possible Glyph for Cholula in the Codex Nuttall", dated 1966.
- Additional notes for the Cholula Gyph paper, dated 1966.
- 2002 Rour Jaguar of Cholula in the codices mixtecos, 25 pages.
- 2008 Another Look at The Olmeca-Xicallanca of Teoyihuacan, Cacaxtla, and Cholula: A final Study. 102 pages.
- Miscellaneous material contained in the notebook: a colored illustration of the mural paintings from the Temple of the Warriors, Chichen Itza, Yucatán, taken out of a publication; an unidentified 8x10 black and white photograph of a stone face; a photocopy of an article "Consummation of Quetzacoatl: Transits of Venus in Mexican Inscriptions," by Cottie Arthur Burland; and the typewritten, carbon draft of an article "The Codex Nuttall: Universal Epic or Narrow Nationalism," by John Molloy, Hugh G. Ball, and William B. Kessell. Also included in this folder is a black and white snapshot of Robert Chadwick and Donald Robertson taken in the 1970s by Martha Robertson at Doris Stone's guest house on her estate.
- Articles published in Vols. 10 and 11 of the Handbook of Middle American Indians: "Postclassic pottery of the Central Valleys" Typewritten carbon manuscript 40 pages.
- "Native Pre-Aztec History of Central Mexico" a photocopy of the galley of published work. 19 pages of galley (30 pages in published work), with a note to Dr. Donald Robertson dated 1971.
- "Archaeological Synthesis of Michoacan and Adjacent Regions" corrected galley of the published work. 17 pages.
- Bound volume of 93 pages of photocopies titled "Citations and reviews of Robert Chadwick's writings 1964-1978"(selected sample) compiled by Robert Chadwick, New York, 1979; Robert Chadwick 3–11–80; reread 5/13/96." Also contains a copy of the 1995 Spanish reprint of Chadwick's original 1966 article "The Olmeca-Xicallanca of Teotihuacan: A Preliminary Study," Mesoamerican Notes 7–8. Mexico: University of the Americas.

=== Anthropological publications: 1960-2013 ===
- 1960: (Co-author with Charles E. Mann). "Present Day Use of Ancient Calendars among the Lowland Mixe", Boletin de estudios oaxaquenos, No. 19, Milta: Museo Frissell del Arte Zapoteca.
- 1962: "An Archeological Survey of the Rend Lake Area", Report No. 1. Archaeological Salvage Report, No 19. Mimeographed for limited circulation. Carbondale: University Museum, Southern Illinois University.
- 1963: "The God Malteutl in the Histoyre du Mechique" Tlalocan, Vol. IV, No. 3, Mexico City: La Casa de Tlaloc and Instituto Nacional de Antropologia e Historia (INAH).
- 1963: (Co-author with CarlosTirso Serna). "Plaza de laPiramide del Sol, Zona 5-B", in Proyecto Teotihuacan, Temporada V, 1962, Boletin del INAH (No. 12, June, 1963) Mexico City: INAH
- 1966: "The Tombs of Monte Alban I Style at Yagul", in Ancient Oaxaca: Discoveries in Mexican Archaeology and History. Edited by John Paddock. Stanford: Stanford University Press.
- 1966: "The Olmeca-Xicallanca of Teotihuacan: A Preliminary Study", in Mesoamerican Notes, No. 7-8 Edited by John Paddock & Evelyn Rattray. Mexico City: University of the Americas.
- 1967: "Un possible glifo de Teotihuacan en el Codice Nuttall", Revista Mexicana de Estudios Antropologicos, Tomo XXI. Mexico City: Sociedad Mexicana de Antropologia.
- 1967: (Co-Author with Richard S. MacNeish) "Codex Borgia and the Venta Salada Phase", Chapter 7, Volume I, "Environment and Resources", of the 5 Volume The Prehistory of the Tehuacan Valley. Edited by Douglas S. Byers. Austin & London: University of Texas Press.
- 1970: "The Tombs of Monte Alban I Style at Yagul", re-edition of 1966.
- 1970: "Un possible glifo de Xochicalco en Los Codice Mixtecos", Tlalocan, Vol. VI, No. 3 Mexico City: La Casa de Tlaloc and INAH.
- 1971: "A Current Trend in Anthropology ", Ichtus, Vol. 1, No. 4, Commerce: University Christian Center, East Texas State University.
- 1971: (Translator) Eduardo Noguera, "The Minor Arts in the Central Valleys", Vol, 10, Part 1, Archaeology of Northern Mesoamerica, pages 258–270, Handbook of Middle American Indians, Edited by Robert Wauchope, Gordon F. Ekholm and Ignacio Bernal. Austin & London: University of Texas Press.
- 1971: "Postclassic Pottery of the Central Valleys", Article 8, Volume 10, Part 1, Archaeology of Northern Mesoamerica, pages 228–257, Handbook of Middle American Indians, Edited by Robert Wauchope, Gordon F. Ekholm and Ignacio Bernal. Austin & London: University of Texas Press.
- 1971: "Native Pre-Aztec History of Central Mexico", Article 20, Volume 11, Part 2, Archaeology of Northern Mesoamerica, pages 474–504, Handbook of Middle American Indians, Edited by Robert Wauchope, Gordon F. Ekholm and Ignacio Bernal. Austin & London: University of Texas Press.
- 1971: "Archaeological Synthesis of Michoacan and Adjacent Regions", Article 29, Volume 11, Part 2, Archaeology of Northern Mesoamerica, pages 657–693, Handbook of Middle American Indians, Edited by Robert Wauchope, Gordon F. Ekholm and Ignacio Bernal. Austin & London: University of Texas Press.
- 1973: Review of "An Olmec Figure at Dumbarton Oaks" by Elizabeth P. Benson, Vol. 75, No. 2 Amer.Anthro
- 1974: Review of "The Aztec Image in Western Thought" by Benjamin Keen, Vol. 76, No. 2, pages 397–399.
- 1974: The Archaeology of a New World "Merchant Culture" 619-page Ph.D. dissertation, Department of Anthropology, Tulane University, Dissertation committee: Dr. Robert Wauchope, chairman, Dr. Donald Robertson and Dr. Arden R. King.
- 1974: "The Archaeology of a New World 'Merchant" Culture' Dissertation Abstracts International, Vol. XXXV, No.3
- 1982: "An Explanation of the Textual Changes in Codex Nuttall". In Aspects Of The Mixteca-Puebla Style And Mixtec And Central Mexican Culture In Southern Mesoamerica: 27–31. Middle American research Institute Occasional parer 4. Tulane University, New Orleans, La.
- 1995: Las "Olmeca-xicalancas" de Teotihuacan: A Preliminary Study. In Antologia de Cacaxtla edited by A. Garcia Cook et al.: I, 120-149 Mexico: INAH.
- 2013: The Olmeca-Xicallanca of Teotihuacan, Cacaxtla, and Cholula. An archaeological, ethnohistorical, and linguistic synthesis. With a contribution of Angel Garcia Cook: El Epiclásico en la región poblano-tlaxcalteca: BAR International Series 2488

== See also ==
- Robert Wauchope, American anthropologist and archeologist
