= Oxford Encyclopedia of Mesoamerican Cultures =

The Oxford Encyclopedia of Mesoamerican Cultures is a three-volume set of articles by many specialists under the general editorship of David Carrasco. Published in 2001, the encyclopedia builds on and updates the sixteen-volume Handbook of Middle American Indians (1964–76). The work's coverage spans Mesoamerica from the prehispanic era to the turn of the twenty-first century. Articles are presented alphabetically, but a synoptic outline of contents gives the titles of principal articles. These include geography and history; Mesoamerican cultures and ethnicities; Mesoamerican studies, with an overview article and articles on approaches, methods, and institutions; written and oral sources divided into prehispanic manuscripts and colonial manuscripts and sources; economy and subsistence; social political and religious organization, with principal articles on civil-religious hierarchy, ethnicity, family and kinship, gender, labor, law, political organization, land tenure, slavery, social stratification, an urbanization; social differentiation; institutions and organizations; cultural interaction and processes of social change; cosmovision and ritual performance, creative expressions and material forms; Mesoamerican sites, cities, and ceremonial centers. There are also biographies of historical figures as well as scholars of Mesoamerican culture. There is no coverage of colonialism per se, or race and racial conflict.
