= Chavero Codex of Huexotzingo =

Documentation of a 1578 judicial proceeding

The Chavero Codex of Huexotzingo of 1578 documents a judicial proceeding against officials who collected excessive taxes in Huexotzingo, located in today's Puebla, Mexico. There are 17 locations in the manuscript, which deals with tribute. These taxes, paid in "money, maize, and shirts and blankets" were collected in "the 21 districts of Huexotzingo between 1571 and 1577." Some of the taxes were used to build a church in the San Salvador district. The numbers in the codex from the surveys submitted by officials are recorded in illustrations "using the Mesoamerican numeric system, with some variations characteristic of the Mexica system."

A book on the codex, Códice Chavero de Huexotzingo: proceso a sus oficiales de república, won the 2005 "Premio INAH Francisco Javier Clavijero."

Historian Alfredo Chavero donated the codex to the National Museum of Mexico in 1906.

== See also ==
- Aztec codices

== Bibliography ==
- Brito Guadarrama, Baltazar (2008). Códice Chavero de Huexotzingo: proceso a sus oficiales de república. Obra diversa (in Spanish) (1. ed.). México, D.F: Instituto Nacional de Antropología e Historia. ISBN 9680303128.
