= Alfredo Chavero =

Mexican politician, archaeologist and playwright

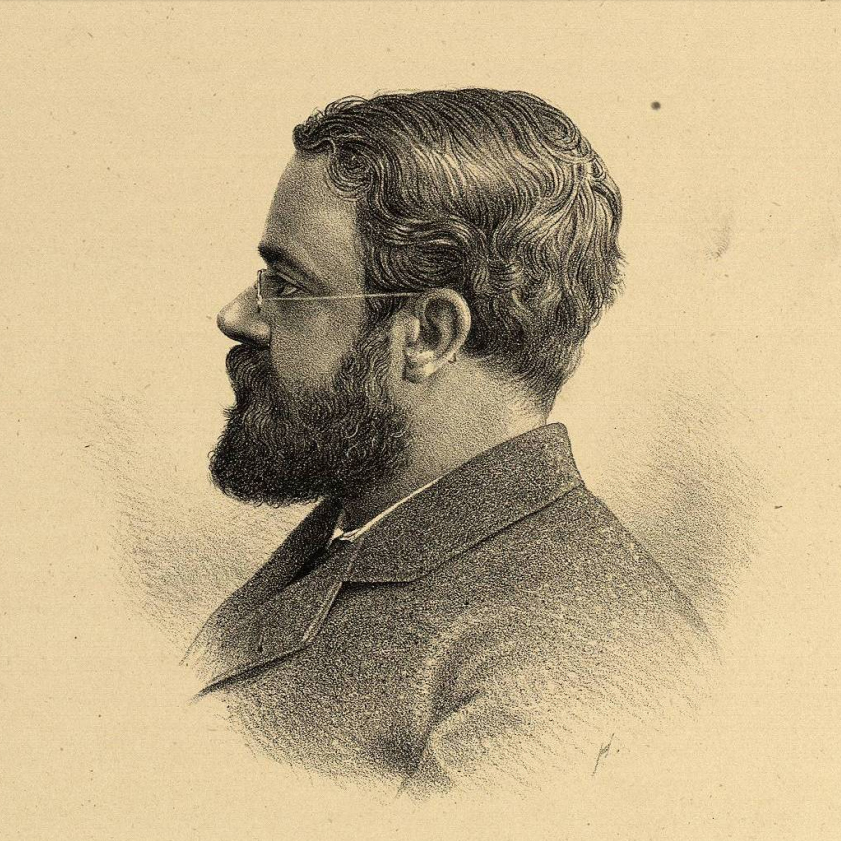

President of the Chamber of Deputies
- In office 16 September 1890 – 30 September 1890
- Succeeded by: Francisco Mejía

Member of the Chamber of Deputies for San Luis Potosí′s 9th district
- In office 16 September 1902 – 15 September 1904

Member of the Chamber of Deputies for Zacatecas′s 9th district
- In office 16 September 1888 – 15 September 1902

Member of the Chamber of Deputies for the Federal District′s 2nd district
- In office 16 September 1878 – 15 September 1880

Personal details
- Born: 1841
- Died: 1906 (aged 64–65)

Alfredo Chavero (1841–1906) was a Mexican archaeologist, politician, poet, and dramatist.

According to Howard F. Cline, "Chavero's most enduring claim to remembrance rests...on [his] completion and extension of Ramírez's plans to republish major native histories and his editorship of pictorial documents."

== Research ==
Chavero conducted numerous investigations on Mexican antiquities. He published Historia Antigua de Mexico, as well as several works on Aztec archaeology, especially on ancient monuments. While excavating the pyramids of Cholula, he discovered some idols that are now in the National Museum of Mexico. His books are often referred to because of his research on Father Sahagún and to the Sun Stone.

== Political career ==
Chavero became a member of the Mexican Congress in 1869. He supported the Mexican presidents Benito Juárez, Sebastián Lerdo de Tejada, Manuel González, and Porfirio Díaz in succession, notwithstanding their different policies.

On 25 June 1879, the government of Diaz ordered the execution of nine citizens of Veracruz who were suspected of conspiracy. This act was severely criticised. This resulted in great public indignation against Mier y Terán, who had executed the order, and Diaz. Chavero was at the time grand master of a masonic lodge and expelled Mier y Terán from the brotherhood. Cavero also suspended Diaz from his masonic rights. These actions garnered great popularity Chavero. In the Mexican Congress, Chavero held a roaring speech against Mier y Terán and Diaz. Afterwards Chavero reconciled with Diaz. Chavero was elected senator in 1886, and was professor for mining, teaching also at law schools of Mexico.

Chavero was elected a member of the American Antiquarian Society in 1881.

When the Mexican government proposed the Law of Monuments (1897), which passed overwhelmingly in the Mexican Congress, Chavero opposed the provision banned the export of Mexican artifacts, which in his view "hindered the flow of artifacts to museums abroad and thus obstructed the cause of science."

At the 1902 International Congress of Americanists in New York, Chavero gave some credit to the French project headed by Joseph Florimond Loubat for major discoveries at Monte Albán. This public declaration before the International Congress of Americanists, including those by Eduard Seler and Franz Boas, were interrupted by Leopoldo Batres, inspector national monuments and Chavero's rival. Batres had excavated at Monte Albán and strenuously objected to Chavero's assertions, since the work was paid for by the Mexican government.

Chavero donated the Chavero Codex of Huexotzingo to the National Museum of Mexico in 1906.

== Poetry ==
Chavero is the author of the dramas "La Reina Xochitl" and "La tempestad de un beso," "Quetzalcoatl," "Los amores de Alarcón," "La hermana de los Ávilas," "El mundo de ahora," and more.

== Works ==
A selected list of Chavero's writings of ethnohistorical interest is published in the Handbook of Middle American Indians.

- Discurso pronunciado en los funerales del C. Benito Juarez presidente de los Estados-Unidos Mexicanos (1872).
- Estudio sobre la Piedra del Sol (1875) y (1877-1903).
- Calendario azteca: ensayo arqueológico por Alfredo Chavero (1876).
- Biografía de Sahagún (1877).
- Sahagun. Estudio por Alfredo Chavero (1877).
- Bienaventurados los que esperan. Comedia en tres actos y en prosa (1878).
- Quetzalcóatl. Ensayo trágico en tres actos y en verso (1878).
- Los amores de Alarcon. Poema dramático en tres actos y en prosa (1879).
- Xóchitl. Drama en tres actos y en verso (1879).
- ¡El huracán de un beso! Drama en dos actos y en prosa, precedido de una introducción, original de Alfredo Chavero (1886).
- Explicaciones del Códice Aubin (1890).
- Explicaciones sobre el Lienzo de Tlaxcala (1892).
- Explicaciones sobre el Códice Borgia (1900).
- Apuntes viejos de bibliografía mexicana (1903).
- Obras del Lic. Don Alfredo Chavero, miembro de número de la Academia Mexicana de la Lengua y correspondiente de la Española. Tomo I: Escritos diversos (1904).
- Discurso pronunciado el 24 de septiembre de 1904 en el Congreso de Artes y Ciencias de la Exposición Universal de San Luis Missouri (1905).
- Calendario de Palemke: signos cronográficos. Primera parte (1906).
- Edición de Historia chichimeca de Fernando de Alva Ixtlilxóchitl (1891-1892).
- Edición de Historia de Tlaxcala de Diego Muñoz Camargo (1892).
