= Norman McQuown =

American anthropologist

Norman A. McQuown (January 30, 1914 – September 7, 2005) was an American anthropologist and linguist. He was a professor at the University of Illinois notable for his extensive field work and study of languages in Mexico and Central America.

== Early life and education ==
Norman A. McQuown was born on January 30, 1914, in Peoria, Illinois. Due to the early death of his mother and sudden departure of his father, he was raised by his grandmother and aunt.

McQuown earned both his BA in German in 1935 and his MA in German and Romance Languages from the University of Illinois. He then earned his Ph.D. from Yale in Linguistics in 1940.

== Career ==
As an anthropologist and linguist, McQuown spent extensive time in the field traveling and immersing himself in various communities conducting research, teaching, translating and developing resources to understand Mexican and Central American languages. Fluent in several languages such as German and Spanish, he is credited with the involvement of several texts such as “El Tzeltal Hablado (1957-1958), Spoken Yucatec Maya (1965), and Spoken Quiché Maya (1966)”. McQuown further utilized his expertise as a long-term professor of both Anthropology and Linguistics at the University of Illinois where he developed the Linguistics program.

== Personal life ==
On November 7, 1942, Norman McQuown married Delores Milleville. They share two daughters, Patricia and Katheryn.

== Selected bibliography ==
- Analysis of the Cultural Content of Language Materials” in Language in Culture (1954)
- The Indigenous Languages of Latin America” in American Anthropologist (1955)
- The Classification of the Mayan Languages” in the International Journal of American Linguistics (1956).
- Reine und angewandte Sprachwissenschaft (Pure and Applied Linguistics) (1975)
