= Victoria Bricker =

American anthropologist (born 1940)

Victoria Reifler Bricker (born 1940) is an American anthropologist, ethnographer and linguist, widely known for her ground-breaking studies of contemporary and historical Maya culture.

== Early life and education ==
Born in Hong Kong, Bricker studied at Stanford University for her undergraduate education, and graduated in 1962 with a bachelor's degree in philosophy and humanities. She attended Harvard University for her graduate education, earning a master's degree in anthropology in 1963 and a Ph.D. in 1968.

== Career and research ==
Bricker has spent her career at Tulane University; she was a visiting lecturer from 1969 to 1970, an assistant professor from 1970 to 1973, an associate professor from 1973 to 1978, and was appointed a full professor in 1978. She is now a professor emerita there. Bricker's research has focused on various aspects of Maya culture in Guatemala, Chiapas, and Yucatán. In Chiapas, she studied Maya ritual humor, oral history, and revitalization, the latter being a subject of her research in Guatemala and Yucatán. In Yucatán, she has also worked on a Maya-English dictionary, the Maya language, and ethnobotany. Bricker has also studied Precolumbian Maya astronomy, calendars, astrology, divination, and script. Her work included studies of the Dresden Codex and Madrid Codex. Her collection of recordings and transcriptions of the Chol, Tzotzil, and Yucatec Maya languages are available at the Archive of the Indigenous Languages of Latin America, and audio recordings and manuscripts are available at the American Philosophical Society archives.

She speaks Spanish, and two Mayan languages: Yucatec and Tzotzil.

== Honors and awards ==
A member of several scientific societies, Bricker has also served in leadership roles with academic publications and societies. She was elected to the National Academy of Science in 1991 and maintains membership in the American Philosophical Society.

- Editor, American Ethnologist (1973–1976)
- Associate editor, Journal of Mayan Linguistics (1978 – )
- Executive board, American Anthropological Association (1980 – )
- Editorial board, Middle American Research Institute (1981 – )
- Chair, Dept. of Anthropology at Tulane University (1988–1991)
- Member, National Academy of Sciences (1991)
- Member, American Philosophical Society (2002)
- Member, American Society for Ethnohistory
- Member, Linguistic Society of America
- Member, Société des Americanistes

== Bibliography ==
- 1973 – Ritual Humor in Highland Chiapas. University of Texas Press. ISBN 9780292719361.
- 1981 – The Indian Christ, the Indian King: The Historical Substrate of Maya Myth and Ritual. University of Texas Press. ISBN 9780292721418.
- 2002 – with Helga-Maria Miram. An Encounter of Two Worlds: The Book of Chilam Balam of Kaua. Middle American Research Institute. ISBN 0-939238-98-5.
- 2011 – with Harvey M. Bricker; winner of the John Frederick Lewis Award. Astronomy in the Maya Codices. American Philosophical Society Press. ISBN 9780871692658
- 2019 – A Historical Grammar of the Maya Language of Yucatán, 1577–2000. University of Utah Press. ISBN 9781607816249.
