= España, la primera globalización =

- Theatrical release poster
- Directed by: José Luis López-Linares
- Edited by: José Luis López-Linares
- Release date: 2021
- Running time: 110 minutes
- Country: Spain
- Language: Spanish
- Budget: €210.000
- Box office: €297.000

España, la primera globalización (Spain, the first globalization) is a Spanish historical documentary film. It was directed by José Luis López-Linares and released in 2021. It was followed by a related work, Hispanoamérica, canto de vida y esperanza, in 2024.

== Contents ==
The documentary stated goal is to debunk the purported "Spanish Black Legend" and to portray little known aspects of the Spanish Empire. It features the presence of 39 historians, such as John Elliott, María Ángeles Pérez Samper, Ricardo García Cárcel, Ramón Tamames, Nigel Townson, Marcelo Gullo, Carmen Iglesias, Elvira Roca Barea and Carlos Martínez Shaw. Next to historians, also geneticist Maarten Larmuseau and museum conservator Gijs van der Ham were interviewed.

== People interviewed ==
- Ferran Adrià
- Ana María Carabias Torres
- Jaime Contreras
- Natalia Denisova
- Carlos Enrique Díaz Urbina
- John Elliott
- Catalina Font
- Antonio García Abasolo
- Rubén García Benito
- Ricardo García Cárcel
- Fernando García de Cortázar
- Manuel Gómez Lara
- Ignacio Gómez de Liaño
- Alfonso Guerra
- Marcelo Gullo
- Gijs van der Ham
- Abigail R. Horro
- Luo Huiling
- Carmen Iglesias
- Pedro Insúa
- Miguel Ángel Ladero Quesada
- Maarten Larmuseau
- Patricio Lons
- Carlos Adrián López Ramos
- Manuel Lucena Giraldo
- Carlos Martínez Shaw
- Juan José Morales
- José María Moreno Martín
- Stanley G. Payne
- María Ángeles Pérez Samper
- Alicia Relinque
- Juan Carlos Rey
- Luis Ribot
- Martín Ríos Saloma
- Elvira Roca Barea
- Adelaida Sagarra Gamazo
- Blas Sierra de la Calle
- Ramón Tamames
- Nigel Townson
- Ricardo Andrés Uribe Parra
- Enriqueta Vila Vilar

== Production ==
The project had a budget of €210.000, of which €96.160 (46%) were raised through an Internet crowdfunding campaign.

== Reception ==
España, la primera globalización became the most watched Spanish documentary in 2021, grossing €297.000 at the box office.
