= Carlos Martínez de Campos y Serrano =

Spanish military officer, historian and academic (1887–1975)

General Carlos Martínez de Campos y Serrano 3rd Duke of la Torre
- Born: Carlos Ignacio Martínez de Campos y Serrano; 6 October 1887; Paris
- Died: 20 May 1975 (aged 87); Madrid
- Burial place: Mingorrubio Cemetery; 40°32′12″N 3°47′11″W
- Military career
- Allegiance: Nationalist Spain
- Branch: Spanish Army
- Rank: Lieutenant general
- Conflicts: Melilla War; Rif War; Spanish Civil War
- Awards: See awards section
- Other work: Chief of the Central General Staff of the Army (1940–1941); Member of the Royal Spanish Academy (1950–1975); Member of the Royal Academy of History (1960–1975)

Chief of the Central General Staff of the Spanish Army
- In office 1940–1941
- Caudillo: Francisco Franco
- Minister of the Army: José Enrique Varela
- Preceded by: Fidel Dávila Arrondo
- Succeeded by: Carlos Asensio Cabanillas

Member of the Royal Spanish Academy
- In office 29 January 1950 – 20 May 1975
- Preceded by: Miguel Artigas Ferrando
- Succeeded by: Manuel de Terán Álvarez

Member of the Royal Academy of History
- In office 1 December 1960 – 20 May 1975
- Preceded by: Alfredo Kindelán
- Succeeded by: Antonio Blanco Freijeiro

Carlos Ignacio Martínez de Campos y Serrano, 3rd Duke of la Torre (6 October 1887 – 20 May 1975) was a Spanish military officer, historian and academic.

== Biography ==
Born on 6 October 1887 in Paris, he was the son of Concepción Serrano —daughter of General Francisco Serrano— and José María Martínez de Campos. He fought in the Melilla War in 1909; later he was stationed as a military attaché in Japan and China. Between 1921 and 1924 he fought in the Rif War. He remained as military attaché of the Spanish embassy in Italy from 1924 to 1931, assuming additional responsibilities in Greece, Bulgaria, Turkey and Albania from his post in Rome starting in 1929. In September 1931 he would return to Spain.

Martínez de Campos, who joined the Nationalist faction during the Spanish Civil War, would be promoted to brigadier general, holding the position of Chief of the Central General Staff of the Spanish Army from 1940 to 1941 and, in 1943, to major general. According to Gonzalo Menéndez-Pidal, Martínez Campos freed the writer Pío Baroja from a probable execution in the town of Santesteban, at the beginning of the Civil War. He was one of the personalities mentioned in the January 1941 order that named the members of the so-called Council of the Hispanidad. In 1943 he was the head of the military commission that negotiated with Nazi Germany the purchase of armaments through the Bär Program.

Martínez de Campos, who took possession of his status as a member of the Royal Spanish Academy on 29 January 1950, was the tutor of Juan Carlos de Borbón between 1955 and 1960. In 1951 he was promoted to lieutenant general. He was placed in reserve by decree in 1957. He joined the Royal Academy of History as a full member on 1 December 1960, although he had been a corresponding member since 1923. He was also a member of the Juan de la Cierva Board of Trustees of the CSIC.

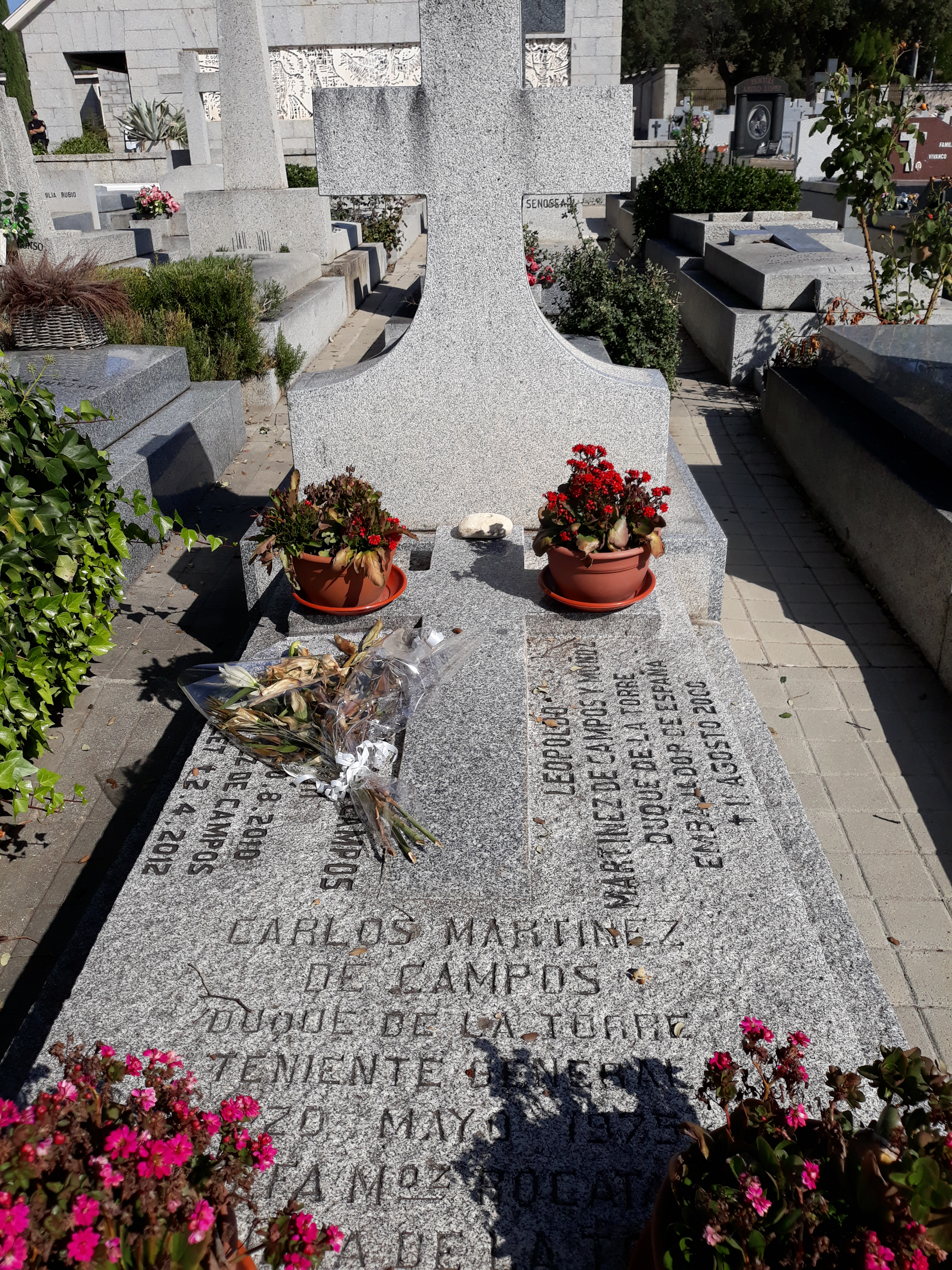
View of the tomb.

He died in Madrid on 20 May 1975.

== Awards ==
- Cross (with White Decoration) of the Military Order, 2nd Class (1935)
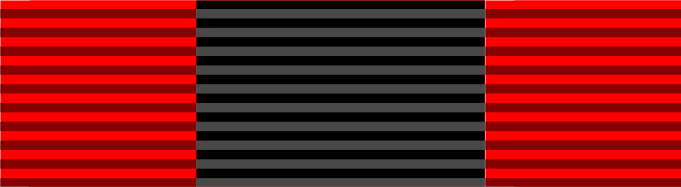
- Commander with Plaque of the Grand Imperial Order of the Red Arrows (1938)
- Military Medal (1939)
- Grand Cross of the Royal and Military Order of Saint Hermenegild (1942)
- Grand Cross (with White Decoration) of Military Merit (1942 and 1944)
- Grand Cross of the Order of Isabella the Catholic (1949)
- Grand Cross of Aeronautical Merit (1954)
- Grand Cross of the Royal and Much Distinguished Order of Charles III (1971)

== Works ==
- (in Spanish) Tratado de equitación (1912)
- (in Spanish) La Artillería y la Aviación (1917)
- (in Spanish) La zona francesa de Marruecos (1918)
- (in Spanish) Historia militar del Japón (1920)
- (in Spanish) Las fuerzas militares del Japón (1922)
- (in Spanish) Arte militar aéreo (1925)
- (in Spanish) La Artillería en la batalla (1928)
- (in Spanish) Pájaros de acero (1930)
- (in Spanish) La campaña de Fezzan (1935)
- (in Spanish) Los fuegos (1935)
- (in Spanish) Arte bélico (1936)
- (in Spanish) La cuestión de los servicios (1936)
- (in Spanish) El empleo de la Artillería (1941)
- (in Spanish) Cuestiones de anteguerra (1944)
- (in Spanish) Teoría de la guerra (1944)
- (in Spanish) Ayer (1945)
- (in Spanish) Otra guerra (1948)
- (in Spanish) Dilemas (1950)
- (in Spanish) Canarias en la brecha (1953)
- (in Spanish) Figuras históricas (1958)
- (in Spanish) Ensayos y comentarios (1962)
- (in Spanish) Islandia tierra de hielo y fuego (1965)
- (in Spanish) España bélica. El siglo XVI (1966)

== Bibliography ==
- Chávarri, Raúl (1967). "Carlos Martínez de Campos: "España bélica. El siglo XVI". Dos tomos. Primer tomo, 306p., segundo tomo, 293. Editorial Aguilar. Madrid, 1966. Colección Evocaciones y Memorias". Cuadernos Hispanoamericanos (in Spanish) (214). Madrid: Instituto de Cultura Hispánica: 239–242. ISSN 0011-250X.
- Delgado Gómez-Escalonilla, Lorenzo (1988). Diplomacia franquista y politica cultural hacia Iberoamérica, 1939–1953 (in Spanish). Madrid: Consejo Superior de Investigaciones Científicas. Centro de Estudios Históricos. ISBN 84-00-06892-0.
- Guerrero Martín, Alberto (2015). Análisis y trascendencia de la colección bibliográfica militar (1928–1936) (PDF) (Thesis) (in Spanish). Madrid: Universidad Nacional de Educación a Distancia.
- López Anglada, Luis (1983). "Escritores militares. El teniente general don Carlos Martínez de Campos y Serrano duque de la Torre y conde de Llovera". Ejército. Revista de las Armas y Servicios (in Spanish). 44 (522). Madrid: Servicio de Publicaciones del Estado Mayor del Ejército: 57–60. ISSN 0013-2918.
- Molina Franco, Lucas (2014). La ayuda militar alemana a España 1939–1945 (Thesis) (in Spanish). Universidad de Valladolid. Facultad de Filosofía y Letras.
- Pabón, Jesús (1975). "Excmo. Sr. D. Carlos Martínez de Campos y Serrano, duque de la Torre (1887–1975)". Boletín de la Real Academia de la Historia (in Spanish). 172 (2). Madrid: Real Academia de la Historia: 273–280. ISSN 0034-0626.

Military offices
Preceded by Fidel Dávila Arrondo	Chief of the Central General Staff of the Spanish Army; 1940–1941	Succeeded by Carlos Asensio Cabanillas
Academic offices
Preceded by Miguel Artigas Ferrando	Member of the Royal Spanish Academy; 29 January 1950 – 20 May 1975	Succeeded by Manuel de Terán Álvarez
Preceded by Alfredo Kindelán	Member of the Royal Academy of History; 1 December 1960 – 20 May 1975	Succeeded by Antonio Blanco Freijeiro
