= Workers' Front (Spain) =

Political party in Spain

Workers' Front Frente Obrero
- Abbreviation: FO
- President: Roberto Vaquero
- Founded: 14 October 2018
- Registered: 13 March 2019
- Newspaper: UNIÓN
- Youth wing: Juventud Combativa
- Ideology: Marxism–Leninism; Socialist patriotism; Spanish republicanism; Left-wing nationalism; Left conservatism; Social conservatism Factions: Hoxhaism
- Political position: Far-left (Note: The party argues that "the left-right dichotomy is no longer valid". However, its leader Roberto Vaquero states that the party represents "the militant, working-class left". It has been overwhelmingly described as far-left, as well as left-wing, by the international media, national media, regional media, and political scientists.)
- Congress of Deputies: 0 / 350
- Senate: 0 / 265
- European Parliament: 0 / 61
- Local seats: 1 / 67,152

Website
- https://frenteobrero.es/

The Workers' Front (Spanish: Frente Obrero, FO) is a Marxist–Leninist political party in Spain, with Roberto Vaquero serving as its president since June 2022. It was founded in October 2018 as a mass organisation by the anti-revisionist party PML (RC) and registered as a separate political party in March 2019. As of 2025, the Workers' Front took part to several national, regional, local, and European elections, winning one local seat in May 2023.

The Workers' Front's political positions include Marxism–Leninism, socialist patriotism, Spanish republicanism, Spanish nationalism, hard Euroscepticism, and social conservatism, with a Hoxhaist faction. Despite rejecting the left–right political spectrum, considering the mainstream left to have abandoned the working class and joined the right-wing in supporting neoliberalism, the party is commonly described as left-wing and far-left, more in line with Communist parties in Eastern Europe. It is also considered a left-conservative party, compared to the German Sahra Wagenknecht Alliance. As a result of its conservative stances on socio-cultural issues, various critics and observers compared the Workers' Front to the far-right Vox and described it as reactionary and right-wing populist in nature, including that the party was National Bolshevik, a claim that Vaquero strongly contested.

== History ==
The Workers' Front was established on 14 October 2018 at the Ateneo de Madrid as a front organisation of the PML (RC). Prior to its establishment, the Workers' Front had already formed committees and organizational structures throughout the country; the party's formation was promoted by various political groups, especially the PML (RC). Subsequently, the Workers' Front expanded to several cities in Spain, such as La Coruña, León, Ponferrada, Zaragoza, and Cádiz. In 2021, the party participated in Okupas, a Spanish squatting movement. FO occupied a prestigious building in the Mercado de Colón district in Valencia. It organized a food bank and the homeless shelter in the building, attacking the local government for not helping over 1,000 homeless people in Valencia. The party also hung the flag of the Second Spanish Republic on the building.

In May 2021, members of the Workers' Front organized a protest against the leader of the Podemos party Irene Montero in Valencia. The party accused Montero and her party of "leaving the workers in the lurch", claiming that Podemos organizes bailouts to banks and companies while Spanish workers are going "months without pay and suffering evictions". FO protesters argued that the feminist and pro-LGBT stances taken by Montero are "symbolic struggles that do not represent reality".

On 12 June 2022, their first congress was held. During the congress, the decision to become a political party was approved by the members. Representatives from other organizations, such as the Polisario Front, spoke during the congress. The congress addressed party's stances on issues such as immigration, the economy, reindustrialization, and Spain's position within the European Union and NATO. The congress also voted to modify the party's logo, and elect the National Board and the party president. Roberto Vaquero was elected the party's president.

In the 2023 Spanish general election, the Workers' Front gained 46,530 and won no seats. In late 2023, the group announced they would be participating in the 2023 Spanish protests against the PSOE government. Since then, the Workers' Front and Vaquero (the party leader since 14 June 2022) gained a presence on social media and national television in Spain, participating in debates on current political issues, such as Horizonte on channel Cuatro. In the 2023 Spanish local elections, a party member was elected councilor of Mandayona in the Province of Guadalajara.

In April 2024, the party held its Second Congress. During the congress, some political positions were revised, such as those concerning the national question and aspects of immigration. A new National Board was elected, and Vaquero was re-elected as president. Soon after its second congress, the party participated in the 2024 Catalan regional election, where it obtained 9,976 votes.

In the 2024 European Parliament election in Spain, the party won 66,242 votes, improving its result from the 2023 general election where it received 46,274 votes. In 2025, the party sparked controversy for publicizing neighborhood watch patrols created in response to immigrant crime and alleged drug trafficking. In January 2026, Frente Obrero joined the protests of Spanish farmers organized against the EU–Mercosur Partnership Agreement. In February 2026, it organized protests in Madrid against immigration in wake of the Spanish government's decision to regularize nearly 850,000 undocumented immigrants, arguing the PSOE-led government of pursuing "feel-good policies" while "dismantling infrastructure, trains, health system, and abandoning the population in natural disasters".

== Ideology ==
The Workers' Front was established as a Marxism–Leninist party, with conservative stances on social and cultural issues. It considers itself a "patriotic and revolutionary movement that fights for and on behalf of workers, for and on behalf of Spain", with the goal of implementing "drastic changes" in Spain and "ending the current regime". Strongly connected with the PML (RC), the Italian historian Steven Forti described it as oscillating between National Bolshevism and "hardline Stalinism". Alejandro Campillo Pérez described it as a "Stalinist-style communist" party. The party was also described as communist by the Spanish newspapers of record, and was classified by El Mundo as "a communist, republican, anti-oligarchic party". The party claimed to reject the labels of political left and right, considering them "two sides of the same coin"; however, its leader Roberto Vaquero described Frente Obrero as "the militant, working-class left". The party was described as left-wing by political commentators and political scientists, and was also commonly described as far-left, with Eugene Costello arguing that the party is "about as far left as you can get".

Frente Obrero is considered to share the national communist profile of the Russian CPRF. The European Conservative described the party as a representative of the "patriotic, pre-woke, pro-work left". El Progreso characterized it as "the old left, as opposed to the identity left", and as an "ultranationalist communist party". According to La Razón, "with a republican and federalist ideology, it has been classified within the communist ideological spectrum". Of the party, its leader wrote: "The need for workers' reorganization is vital, it is necessary to fight for revolutionary unity in a broad, united front of all workers. With this aim in mind, the Frente Obrero was born, which only tries to serve the unity of all those who want to rebuild a revolutionary, working class and militant left, which truly resists this system and its single thinking, which defends the workers, our country and which of course is aimed at the transformation and progress of our society." He defined the Workers' Front as a "national political and revolutionary front with the aim of fighting for the unity of the workers and for the transformation of our society, it is committed to a popular and federal Republic aimed at socialism."

=== Party programme ===
In its party programme A Spain for the Workers, the Workers' Front postulated national sovereignty, Hispanic identity (Hispanidad), free university education, nationalization of the Spanish economy, establishment of a socialist economic system, energy sovereignty, nuclear energy, increasing the minimum wage, supporting the rural sector, promoting birth rates, creating more public housing, introducing rent control, and limiting immigration. The party focuses on class struggle and a planned economy, preservation of the "classical, Christian" culture of Spain, and support for Spanish republicanism. It also called for Spanish withdrawal from the European Union (EU) and NATO, along with expropriation of large landowners and political amnesty for political prisoners; the party criticized liberal democracy as "a scam designed to favor the party system that defends the interests of big capital", and instead supported "promoting and protecting our culture, history, and traditions from those who only want to see it disappear so they can control us more effectively". The party also takes an openly anti-capitalist and anti-free trade stance, decrying both capitalist and free trade as a threat to the Spanish workers and the economic sovereignty of Spain.

In its programme, the Workers' Front called for "the overthrow of the monarchy imposed by Franco" and its replacement by a "federal, popular republic on the path to socialism". It called for a dictatorship of the proletariat which would destroy "the repressive apparatus of the state: the judiciary, administration, police", and be a "democratic regime for the working class" but "dictatorial for the bourgeoisie and other exploiting classes". The party's federal popular republic would pursue "the recovery of Spanish national sovereignty", reindustrializing the country, nationalizing the Spanish economy, "repealing the successive labor reforms that have strengthened free and cheap dismissal for companies", expelling all foreign military bases, closing the border with Morocco, and immediately expelling all immigrants who committed crimes. In its opposition to the European Union, the Workers' Front argued that "Spanish sovereignty is being held hostage by the EU", which the party said "dictates how much and what we produce, tying our hands and feet, denying us the future we deserve." Since its establishment, the party also expressed opposition to capitalism, NATO, surrogacy, feminism, deindustrialization, queer theory, the Trans Law (Ley Trans), affirmative action, Islamization, cosmopolitanism, and political correctness.

The party adheres to Hoxhaist ideology. It is critical of Cuba, North Korea, China, and Venezuela, arguing that these countries are not socialist but neoliberal (China and Venezuela), state capitalist (Cuba), or "crazy" (North Korea). Vaquero argues that the only decent socialist regimes have been the Soviet Union under Lenin and Stalin, as well as the Socialist People's Republic of Albania (1944–1985) of Enver Hoxha. In contrast, the party has denounced Khrushchev as "revisionist", Yugoslav Tito as "opportunist", Trotskyism and Maoism as deviations from Marxism, and Romanian Ceaușescu for opening the Romanian economy to the West. Hoxha has been described as the party's role model. The party attacks the "pop left" (Spanish: izquierda pop) for falling into a "diversity trap", arguing that causes such as feminism, animal rights, inclusive language or environmentalism become "battles comfortable for the [capitalist] system" and bury the class struggle in the long run. Frente Obrero is supported by the Communist Party of Spain (Marxist–Leninist). Frente Obrero has displayed the portraits of Lenin and Stalin during its marches, and featured banners "in honor of those who fell for the Republic" and emblems of the Soviet Union.

=== Classification ===
In 2021, Spanish political scientist Jasiel Paris argued that the Workers' Front represents the "classic left" or old left, and stands to the opposition of the postmodernist left; for Workers' Front, "Marxism sought the empowerment of workers (who in Spain are mostly white, heterosexual men), while the postmodern left seeks empowerment against white, heterosexual men". Paris observed that the Workers' Front should be compared to the Eastern European Communist parties, such as the Communist Party of the Russian Federation, Macedonian Left, and the Party of Communists of the Republic of Moldova, as these parties together with the Workers' Front combine "a socialist economic vision with a cultural vision that we could call conservative because it is patriotic, protectionist and family-oriented". The Workers' Front was also considered similar to the German Bündnis Sahra Wagenknecht, and both parties share views such as advocating a rapprochement with Russia and opposition to immigration, 'queers', feminism, and environmentalism.

Frente Obrero has also been described as [socially] "reactionary left", left-wing nationalist, left-wing conservative, and as adhering to traditional and nationalist values. Considered to represent the nationalist and conservative left, the party expressed support for traditional values and closeness to nationalism, focusing on the workerist blue-collar perspective, and its proposals reiterated criticism against "gender ideology" or the "LGBTI lobby". The party expressed opposition to immigration, advocating strict border control, and arguing that the wages of Spanish workers are declining because of liberal immigration laws; however, the party also stressed that "immigrants are not to blame" and are "victims", with the real culprit being "the capitalist system, which promotes this type of migration to exploit them and lower wages in Spain", and that "the most rancid right uses immigration to generate hatred and social confrontation". Nonetheless, the party recommended strict control of immigration, including the immediate expulsion of illegal immigrants.

=== Social issues ===
The Workers' Front strongly criticized socially progressive left-wing parties. It considers queer theory and other postmodernist causes to be a corrupting element on the left that alienates it from labor. The party accused Podemos of being "a pawn at the service of big business and banks", while arguing that Más País was "leaving the workers on the street". It argued that the mainstream left-wing parties of Spain alienated the workers and caused the rise of the far-right Vox by embracing neoliberal economics and "gender ideology". The party's stance is compared to the German BSW, and both parties criticize 'woke leftism' as "weapons of capital that create precarity for the European proletariat". The party also calls for remigration that is to be achieved via mass deportation of immigrants.

The party argues that there are many similarities between fascism and liberalism, while rejecting feminism, the animal rights movement, social democracy, and the LGBT movement, with Vaquero stating: "No matter how many revolutionary symbols and terms they use to disguise themselves, they are part of the system, they are part of the problem. For them, everything is fascism, but they defend the system's single mindset. They are closer to what they accuse everyone else of than they realise. ... Workers don't care about queer theory, inclusive language, quotas and other nonsense. This 'woke left' does not represent workers, nor does it provide solutions to their problems. For this reason, many workers are becoming disillusioned and criminalising the left, moving closer to positions such as those of the PP or even VOX."

While defining itself within the framework of Marxism–Leninism, the Workers' Front heavily incorporated nationalist and patriotic themes into its message. For example, the party stressed and promoted the need to defend the national sovereignty of Spain, as well as revolutionary patriotism and national pride. Within its communist rhetoric, the party stressed the policies and ideas of Joseph Stalin. It also condemned the May 68 protests, with party leader Vaquero stating: "The left today is the heir of May 1968, when, as Pasolini said, the most working-class people in that conflict were the police, who were at least the sons of peasants. The students were, for the most part, the sons of rich people, since money was needed to study. The left today is empty, there is no revolution." He also wrote:

Cosmopolitanism is currently being promoted. … It is a kind of globalism, a transgressive culture which, although they try to convince us that it is the international culture of the moment that prevails over national cultures, is nothing more than the hegemonic American culture that they are trying to impose on the rest of the world. … The collective identities that united people in the past are now under attack from individualism, consumerism and the pursuit of personal satisfaction in the moment, regardless of the consequences. The important thing is that you consume, and collective identities get in the way of that: differences with other potential consumers only make it harder for the large companies that promote this way of acting to make more profits. They seek to homogenise the population, isolate it and create docile, alienated and submissive consumers.

The party is strongly critical of feminism and transgender rights, arguing that both movements have a political agenda that "overrides women's rights if it deems it necessary". Vaquero argued that feminism goes against the protection of women, stating that feminist positions endanger women by promoting immigration and rehabilitative justice which "has been used to release rapists from prison". On the issue of gender, Vaquero stated: "It's so ridiculous; being a woman is something material, biological—you either are or you aren't. The transgender movement is bringing so much pain to teenagers and their families; it's ruining their lives." The party also criticizes queer theory as a "further denegeration" of feminism, arguing that through "individual transgression, it seeks to deny all collective identity."

Workers' Front postulates abolition of the Spanish ministry of equality, repeal of all anti-discrimination and "queer ideology" laws, elimination of gender quotas, harsher penalties for sexual crimes, and introducing new policies that encourage childbirth. On feminism in general, Vaquero stated: "Feminism doesn't seek equality, and furthermore, it's based on false precepts to maintain its privileges. The gender pay gap and the glass ceiling don't exist, quotas don't bring equality, being a woman isn't a feeling, and patriarchy doesn't exist. Patriarchy, by definition, is a socioeconomic system that privileges men over women simply because they are men. How then can there be laws in the country that discriminate against men in favor of women? It's all just a narrative, a systemic trend supported by large corporations and governments to keep people divided over trivial issues and divert attention from real problems."

=== National issues ===
The party is considered ultranationalist. It declares to be "in defense of culture and national identity" and the national sovereignty of Spain, accusing the Spanish left of "the defense and promotion of foreign things over our history and traditions", and claims that the Spanish ruling class had abandoned the Spanish cultural identity. It argues that the promotion of foreign culture is carried out in Spain to "erase the cultural and historical legacy" of the Spanish people and to undermine the sense of belonging and national identity in order to "erase everything that creates a sense of unity among workers" and render them "docile, submissive, and individualistic to ensure there is no response every time they undermine our dignity". The party's defense of national values extends to defense of Christianity; it postulates the need to fight the "Islamization" of Spain, claiming that there is "a hatred of Christianity" in Spain. Vaquero stated that he is "culturally Christian", and argued that Christianity should be reflected "in family values, in the way we relate to one another, in the role of women in our societies, in our understanding of violence and order, in our traditions". He also argued that class consciousness is inseparable from national consciousness and criticized the postmodern left for abandoning the idea of the nation.

The Workers' Front showed opposition to the independence of Catalonia, arguing that the pro-independence Catalan parties "do not even represent independence" and instead have "fostered Islamization and mass immigration in Catalonia". Ahead of the 2024 Catalan regional election, the Workers' Front announced its participation and called for Catalan voters to reject "Islamization and the fictitious separatist process". The party instead proposed to turn Spain into a federation. It also expressed support for Spanish ownership of Ceuta and Melilla, and decried Moroccan claims to these cities. The Workers' Front also claimed the Spanish ownership of Gibraltar, calling it a colony that is an "important strategic enclave that does not belong to them [the United Kingdom]", and arguing that its native population was expelled by the British. It calls for "expelling all foreign military bases, starting with the British army's presence in Gibraltar."

The party showed support for Kurdish independence, as well as the self-determination of Western Sahara, declaring that "Spain will assume its historical debt and will defend without reservation the right of the Sahrawi people to self-determination." Vaquero condemned support for Ukraine in the Russo-Ukrainian war, writing: "The new left talks a lot about the struggle for peace and against the vestiges of colonialism, but then supports any action taken by NATO. If it is in line with their conception of 'human rights', then it is fine. The left wing spent years saying 'No to war' in Iraq, but they have not taken the same stance with Ukraine. It all depends on what suits Uncle Sam." Frente Obrero's sister party PML-RC declares its non-support for the conflict, seeing the Russo-Ukrainian War as a confrontation between two capitalist countries for territory, although Vaquero interviewed a Spanish volunteer fighting on the Russian side, and stated that it is "logical that Russia would seek to create a buffer state to curb NATO expansionism".

Some have described the Workers' Front as Falangist, noting that despite its Marxist–Leninist doctrine, the party is strongly nationalist and combines its anti-capitalism with anti-immigration stances, along with calling for the defense of both the Spanish "national proletariat" and national integrity. It also promotes the concept of Hispanidad that is opposed to the "Anglo-American universe". Falangist writer Eduardo García Serrano argued that the Workers' Front, beyond its "youthful communism", also carries forward "social patriotism which was the essence of José Antonio Primo de Rivera". Serrano asserted that Vaquero is "a Falangist but doesn't know it". Similarly, Antonio Castilla Martín of the University of Salamanca argued that the party "draws on the symbolism and rhetoric of the early days of Falangism and National-Syndicalism". Vaquero stated that the Workers' Front is neither fascist nor Falangist, and that he is familiar with Primo de Rivera's works but does not find him interesting. He criticized Falangism for its alliance with Francoism.

== Criticism ==
Since its establishment, the Workers' Front attracted criticism from other leftist organizations as transphobic due to its opposition to what it calls "gender ideology" and support of the idea that gender identity (especially being a woman) is only a feeling. During Pride Month, the Workers' Front denounced public pro-LGBT campaigns by other political mainstream, accusing them of "politicizing sexual orientation and making it something supposedly revolutionary, while implementing reactionary measures such as queer ideology or the trans law". The party altered pro-LGBT posters; for example, in a poster that read "My partner is bisexual", the party's activists crossed out "bisexual", replacing it with "unemployed". As a result, the Workers' Front's actions and rhetoric was criticized as homophobic.

Left-wing critics argued that the Workers' Front was reactionary and racist because of its strong opposition to the increasing presence of Islamic immigration not integrated into European societies (allegedly disrespectful of women's or LGBT's rights, other times linked to higher crime rates than the native population, or with violent events motivated by religious fanaticism). In addition, critics negatively compared it to the far-right party Vox, and accused it of giving credit to the Great Replacement theory. In November 2022, the Workers' Front was attacked for organizing a march at the Complutense University of Madrid that exalted Stalin. The event resulted in members of the party clashing with local far-left student organizations, including the Trotskyist Workers' Revolutionary Current. According to left-wing critics, the Workers' Front "expresses the most reactionary Stalinism, specifically aimed at establishing itself among the youth of working-class neighborhoods".

The party has been called a "left-wing Vox" given its conservative stances on social issues, such as its opposition to immigration, LGBT rights, feminism, and its attacks on the "Islamization" of Spain and "gender ideology". The Spanish magazine The Objective argued that the Workers' Front was "reminiscent of Vox's in some points: immigration control, promotion of births, and opposition to positive discrimination against women". El Español also observed that the party took a mildly defensive tone towards Vox, arguing that Vox is not fascist or far-right; instead, Vaquero argues: "They are right-wing populists; now, they call everything politically incorrect fascist and they are distorting the term." Spanish political analyst Asier Balaguer Navarro rejected this claim, writing: "Yes, in the sense that many of its proposals, precisely those that coincide with the conservative party, have a lot of social resonance, and are easily assimilated by the electoral objective of the party; also yes, because of the confrontation with political correctness, defense of the unity of Spain or the rejection of the 'woke laws'. But that is where the similarities end. The Workers' Front is against the EU, it still has a communist base in which the public and the planned are a substantial part of its economic theories; it is openly republican, anti-NATO, secular..."

The Workers' Front has been criticized as National Bolshevik. In an interview, Vaquero strongly rejected this classification, stating: "National Bolshevism, as a term, is used by people with little understanding of ideology or politics to criminalise those who do not fit in with the revolutionary fads of the system. If you are a patriot, you are a National Bolshevik. If you disagree with the government's nonsense, you are too. If you disagree with the ravings of the Queer lobby, you are too. If you are against the bourgeois Catalan independence process, of course you are too. And finally, if you say that class struggle is the main thing and that the transversality of struggles only reinforces the system, oops! Then you're definitely a Nazbol. It's absurd. National Bolshevism does not draw on Marxism. It is twinned with fascism, and we are anti-fascists, but for real, not as a fashion, an aesthetic marked by the system itself."

The party was also described as a representative of "red-brownism" (Spanish: rojipardismo). Steven Forti argues that the party oscillates "between rojipardismo and hardline Stalinism". Some Spanish commentators accuse the party of being "red-brown" or "left-wing fascists", citing Frente Obrero's concept of a "national working class" which rejects any ideology that dilutes the collective into the individual. The party declares a crusade against the "woke and postmodern left", dismisses feminism as an anti-revolutionary ideology that pits women against men, rejects queer theory for "replacing the collective with the individual", and supports closing border against illegal immigration. In contrast, political scientist Fernando José Vaquero Oroquiet criticized the use of the term, stating that it is used to accuse figures and parties of National Bolshevism or convergence with Nazism, even when they are far removed from such ideas, listing Hásel-Paris Álvarez, Ana Iris Simón, Víctor Lenore, German BSW and Frente Obrero as examples.

== Elections ==
The Workers' Front participated in elections for the first time in the 2023 Spanish local elections. They ran in Vilalba dels Arcs (Catalonia), Santa Margalida (Balearic Islands), Mislata (Valencian Community), and Mandayona (Castilla–La Mancha), winning one seat in Mandayona.

=== Election results ===
2023 Spanish local elections
| Municipality | Votes | % | Seats |
|---|---|---|---|
| Vilalba dels Arcs | 27 | 7.6% | 0 |
| Santa Margalida | 100 | 1.8% | 0 |
| Mislata | 255 | 1.1% | 0 |
| Mandayona | 42 | 21.6% | 1 |

=== Cortes Generales ===
| Election | Leading candidate | Congress | | | | Senate | | Government |
| Election | Leading candidate | Votes | % | Seats | +/– | Seats | +/– | Government |
|---|---|---|---|---|---|---|---|---|
| 2023 | Roberto Vaquero | 46,274 | 0.19 (14th) | 0 / 350 | 0 | 0 / 208 | 0 | Extra-parliamentary |

=== European Parliament ===
European Parliament
| Election | Leading candidate | Votes | % | Seats | +/– | EP Group |
|---|---|---|---|---|---|---|
| 2024 | Roberto Vaquero | 66,039 | 0.38 (12th) | 0 / 61 | 0 | – |

=== Regional parliaments ===
| Region | Election | Votes | % | Seats | +/– | Government |
|---|---|---|---|---|---|---|
| Basque Country | 2024 | Did not contest | | 0 / 75 | 0 | No seats |
| Catalonia | 2024 | 10,118 | 0.32 (12th) | 0 / 135 | 0 | No seats |
| Galicia | 2024 | Did not contest | | 0 / 75 | 0 | No seats |

== See also ==
- List of political parties in Spain
- National communism
- Workers Party of Britain, a minor British political party also backed by an anti-revisionist communist party (CPGB-ML)
