= Elvira Roca Barea =

Spanish academic and writer (born 1966)

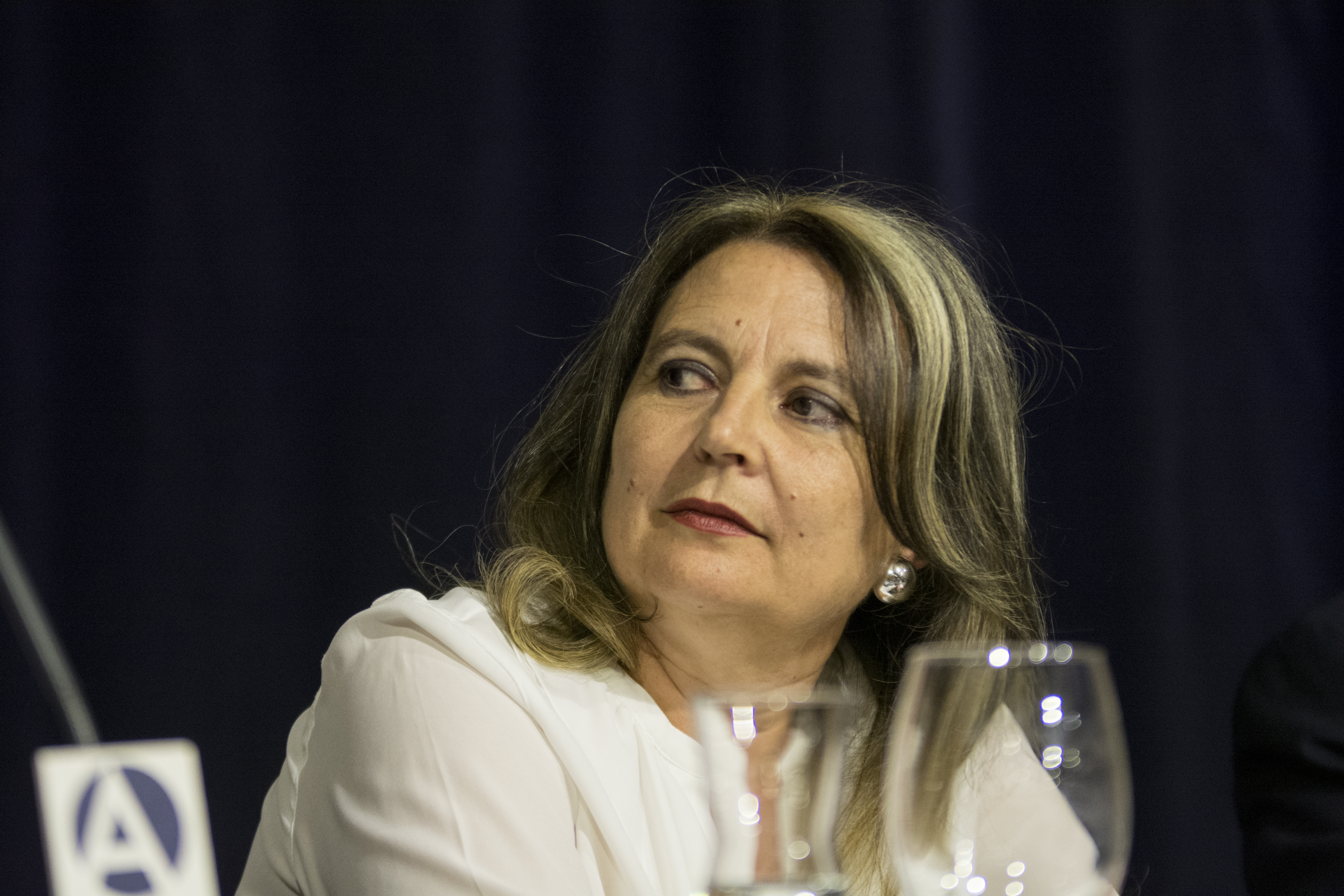
Elvira Roca Barea in 2017

María Elvira Roca Barea (Note: Sometimes abbreviated to "MERB" or "ERB" in written sources) (born 1966) is a Spanish academic and writer. She studied philology, and specialized in the literature of the Middle Ages and early modern Europe. Her research work has primarily focused on narrative strategies in different literary periods, but she became famous for her work on the Spanish Black Legend.

== Career ==
Born in El Borge (province of Málaga) in 1966, she earned a licentiate degree in Spanish Philology and later obtained a master's degree in Medieval Literature, and a PhD in Classical Philology at the University of Málaga. She has worked for the Spanish National Research Council (CSIC) and has lectured at Harvard University in the United States. She is the author of several scholarly publications regarding, mainly, rhetoric and the construction of images and discourses through theatre and literature.

She works as a secondary school teacher at the IES Huerta Alta in Alhaurín de la Torre.

== Works ==
=== Imperiofobia y leyenda negra ===
Her 2016 book, "Imperiofobia y leyenda negra: Roma, Rusia, Estados Unidos y el Imperio español" (Empire-phobia and Black Legend: Rome, Russia, United States and the Spanish Empire) became a bestseller and won numerous awards. The book is a work of advocacy, with a preface that declares that the author doesn't plan on being exhaustive but on putting forward the lesser known information about various empires and their ideological rivals. Roca Barea coins the term "Imperiofobia" (from "imperio" meaning empire and the suffix equivalent to English "phobia") to refer to a characteristic, repetitive process of demonization through distortion and magnification that all multi-cultural empires suffer from neighbouring nations, given certain circumstances. She argues that the Spanish Black Legend is not a unique phenomenon, but a particularly persistent case of this broader phenomenon, which also affected other empires like ancient Rome and Ottoman Turkey, and is now affecting the modern United States, especially in the Islamic world.

In her book she offers a definition of both "empire" and "black legend". She then attempts to show the common elements and strategies shared by this discourse across nations and times, by deconstructing and exposing the similarities between the anti-American, anti-Russian, anti-Roman and anti-Spanish propaganda produced by their respective contemporaries, as well as the similarities in how the empires responded—or rather, did not respond.

The book served as the inspiration of the 2021 documentary film España, la primera globalización, in which Roca Barea herself participated.

=== Fracasología ===
Roca Barea's second book develops her main theory that a distorted representation of Spain's history exists due the hostility of France and the Protestant nations and extends it to what she views as misrepresentation of Spanish history at home. In Fracasología she argues that from the rise of the Bourbon dynasty, Spanish intellectuals have "fossilised self-contempt and uncritical admiration for modernity among Spaniards". According to José-Carlos Mainer, Barea argues in the work that self-criticism is something exclusive to Spaniards, and that it is also a negative trait, or a "sin".

== Awards ==
In 2018 she was awarded the Medal of Andalusia and Medal of Honor of San Telmo awarded by the Andalusian government.

In 2019, Roca-Barea's "Imperiophobia and Leyenda Negra" won the Espasa-Calpe Award for works of literature, journalism and thought, awarded annually since 1984. According to the jury her work was "a magnificent essay, a brave revision which changes the traditional image of the history of Spain and the understanding that we Spaniards have of ourselves."

== Reception ==
Ricardo García Cárcel, Chair of Early Modern History at the Autonomous University of Barcelona and author of La leyenda negra: historia y opinión (1992), argues that, whether Roca Barea likes it or not, it is not currently possible to find any European or American historian with scientific credentials who accepts the extremes of the so-called Leyenda negra ("Black Legend"). This, according to Carcel, is precisely because the exaggerations of the Black Legend have already been thoroughly deconstructed by European and American hispanists such as Elliott, Parker, Benassar or Vincent.

The historian Fernando García de Cortázar, Professor of Contemporary History at the University of Deusto and director of the Vocento Foundation and National History Prize 2008, believes that with Elvira Roca's work "we are once again aware of to what extent the entire history of Spain was misrepresented and had been manipulated to offer an absolutely negative view of it and, of course, contrary to the progress of civilization."

She received significant praise from Peruvian Nobel Prize Winner, Mario Vargas Llosa, who considered Imperiofobia a "book of rigorous scholarship" which is "combative, deep, controversial and reads without pause".

=== Criticism ===
Historian Miguel Martínez, of the University of Chicago, finds fault with her presentation of empires as "victims" instead of aggressors. In his review of Roca's Imperiofobia he states that while it is well-sourced it also contains key historical omissions and severe ideological bias. Martínez argues that Roca systematically omits relevant data contradicting her vision of the Spanish Empire, giving examples such as Roca Barea's comparison of a supposed lack of rebellions in the Spanish Americas with the Indian Mutiny when in reality there were dozens of rebellions against Spanish rule. He also highlights Roca Barea's dismissal of Spanish atrocities in the Americas, citing exceptionally well-documented practices such as amputation, burning and mass killings. He further criticises Roca Barea's refusal to engage with the role of England as an imperial power, arguing that "exploring anti-British propaganda would have rendered her dated vision of perfidious Albion as a machine of anti-Hispanic propaganda absurd". He also takes issue with various perceived inconsistencies between the way she applies her arguments to the history of Spain and to that of other countries. In his view "with numerous scraps of truth, Roca Barea weaves a monumental fallacy which is intellectually unsustainable and dangerous from an ethical and political point of view".

José Luis Villacañas authored Imperiofilia y el populismo nacional-católico (Lengua de Trapo, 2019), as a refutation of Imperiofobia. According to Villacañas, Imperiofobia lacks intellectual rigour and is alien to the parametres of "historical and academic research", featuring a brand of "reactionary intellectual populism". Villacañas considers the underlying interest in the work of Barea to be the underpinning of an ancient metaphysical struggle between Catholicism (identified by Barea with "Spain") and protestantism (with Barea adopting an anglophobic, germanophobic, dutchphobic vision of history, albeit, rooted in an innovative vision of "Hispanidad", rather than the historically more common Anti-US sentiment).

Regarding Fracasología, José-Carlos Mainer considers the Roca Barea's work to be blind to the wholesale reanalysis of the literary historiography dealing with the century of Enlightenment that has taken place in the last six decades, as Roca Barea does "not give a damn about all that historians and philologists have written about the 18th-century in Spain". When it comes to literary style, Mainer describes the prose in Fracasología as "capricious and impulsive", sprinkled with an "abundant" yet "arbitrary" bibliography with a number of mistakes.

== Political positions ==
In 2018, Roca Barea signed a manifesto entitled Manifiesto por la historia y la libertad promoted by the Francisco Franco National Foundation, rejecting the Law of Historical Memory as "an attack on constitutional rights to political opinion and an attempt to impose an official version of history". Roca Barea is an opponent of Catalan nationalism, which she believes to be incapable of moderation, and viewed the movement which led to the Catalan independence referendum of 2017 as a "rebellion of feudal elites".

== Publications ==
- A. Alberte González, M. E Roca Barea. "Edición de artes predicatorias latinas medievales". La filología latina hoy: Actualización y perspectivas, Vol. 1, 1999, ISBN 84-930825-1-1, págs. 591-597
- M.E Roca Barea: La influencia de Cicerón y Quintiliano en las ideas sobre el estilo en las cartas de Plinio el Joven. Quintiliano, historia y actualidad de la retórica : actas del Congreso Quintiliano : historia y actualidad de la retórica : XIX Centenario de la "Institutio Oratoria" / coord. por Tomás Albaladejo, José Antonio Caballero López, Emilio del Río Sanz, Vol. 2, 1998, ISBN 84-89362-39-4, págs. 1053-1058
- A. Alberte González, M. E Roca Barea. El estudio de las artes predicatorias "status quaestionis". Retórica y texto : [III Encuentro Interdisciplinar sobre Retórica, Texto y Comunicaciones] / coord. por Antonio Ruiz Castellanos, Antonia Víñez Sánchez, Juan Sáez Durán, 1998, ISBN 84-7786-295-8, págs. 15-19
- M.E Roca Barea. Teatro y predicación: la predicación como espectáculo en el bajo medievo y el Renacimiento. En torno al teatro del Siglo de Oro : actas de las jornadas XII-XIII celebradas en Almería / coord. por José Juan Berbel Rodríguez, 1996, ISBN 84-8108-115-9, págs. 235-244
- MER Barea El “Libro de la Guerra” y la traducción de Vegecio por Fray Alfonso de San Cristóbal - Anuario de estudios medievales, 2007 - estudiosmedievales.revistas.csic.es
- MER Barea -Diego Guillén de Ávila, autor y traductor del siglo XV- Revista de filología española, 2006
- MER Barea Las novelas de Caballería en Oriente y Occidente: aventura y magia en Chrétien de Troyes y El Caballero de la piel de leopardo- Exemplaria: Revista de literatura comparada, 2000 - dialnet.unirioja.es
- MER Barea Imperiofobia y leyenda negra- editorial Siruela-Madrid, 2016
