= Ituriel Moctezuma =

Mexican politician and activist

Leader of Pacto por Anáhuac
- Incumbent
- Assumed office 2024

Personal details
- Born: 18 September 1984 (age 42) Mexico City, Mexico
- Party: Pacto por Anáhuac (since 2024)
- Education: National Autonomous University of Mexico

Ituriel Moctezuma Romero (September 18, 1984) is a Mexican politician and indigenous activist. He is the president of the political party Pacto por Anáhuac, in which he tried to postulate himself as a candidate for President of Mexico during the 2024 elections, without success. He is a direct descendant of Aztec Emperor Moctezuma II and a member of the Consejo Nacional de Pueblos Originarios y Comunidades Indígenas in Mexico City.

== Biography ==
Moctezuma Romero is a descendant of Moctezuma II through Diego de Alvarado Huanitzin and Teresa Francisca de Moctezuma, the emperor's nephew and daughter, respectively. His ancestors also include Pedro Romero de Terreros, Count of Regla. He graduated with an honorary degree in electrical and electronic engineering in the National Autonomous University of Mexico, after which he started managing the legacy of his family at the head of the Tenochcayotl-Casa Moctezuma foundation. He later became a member of the Consejo Nacional de Pueblos Originarios y Comunidades Indígenas of Mexico City.

In 2024, he announced his candidacy for president of Mexico in the federal elections, ranking fifth among the most notorious candidates behind Claudia Sheinbaum, Xóchitl Gálvez, and Jorge Álvarez Máynez. The independent Marco Vinicio Dávila, but the Instituto Nacional Electoral denied it because Pacto por Anáhuac is not eligible as a party. Pacto por Anáhuac had taken position for the representation of the indigenous peoples of Mexica, featuring members like Tiburcio Zapata, grandson of the historical figure Emiliano Zapata, and Mario Ortiz Tobilla, indigenous governor of Chiapas and member of the Ejército Zapatista de Liberación Nacional.

In March 2025, he was part of Hispanoamérica, un futuro compartido, a promotional event of the new documentary directed by José Luis López-Linares, director of Hispanoamérica, canto de vida y esperanza. He shared panel with Alfonso Borrego, descendant of Geronimo, and Michael N. Henderson, descendant of freedmen from Spanish Louisiana.

== Views ==
Moctezuma has been considered an indigenist, although he instead promotes a "indohispanidad", a fusion of the Native American and Hispanic cultures. He considers his ancestor Moctezuma Xocoyotzin an "American Renaissance man", and who "wanted a world where Castilla and Tenochtitlan, Europe and America, could coexist and fuse together their cultures, kingdoms and religions." From his research he believes Moctezuma came to see Hernán Cortés as a friend and protegee. He regards Cortés as another historical figure of political value, who also sought the union of the Iberian and Mesoamerican peoples before being involved in a war caused by circumstances, which would have been avoided had Moctezuma had free way to act. Moctezuma sees descendants of the emperor like himself as part of the living history of Hispanic America.

He is opposed to the Spanish Black Legend, which he considers foreign propaganda against the union of Hispanic America, and also opposes the black legend against Mesoamerican peoples, considering both of them harmful for Mexicans. In 2024, he stated, "If Spain or Mexico committed mistakes in any moment of their history, only Spaniards and Mexicans have the right to speak." He acknowledged the existence of conflict of their shared history, although not critical: "if we are going to apologize, there is a lot to apologize for in both sides, but it would be most correct to thank each other instead." He believes Spain and Mexico should cease making two opposed currents of historiography and start the construction of a common, coherent history. He also noted the irony that there are statues of Moctezuma II in Spain but not in Mexico.

The ground of his views is to reestablish the political ties between Mexico and Spain, which he consider twin nations and heirs of a five-century mestizaje. He also sees necessary for their shared interests to get rid of the classification of political left and right in Mexico, noting that in Mesoamerica "there was no political right or left, only the duty to rule for common good." Moctezuma holds that it is essential to create a Hispanic-American economic, industrial, and military bloc, a "Indo-Hispanic Commonwealth", as the only possible way for their nations, especially against foreign competition. He proposes that other descendants of Moctezuma settled in Spain form their own political parties to facilitate it.
