= Martín Almagro Gorbea =

Spanish prehistorian (born 1946)

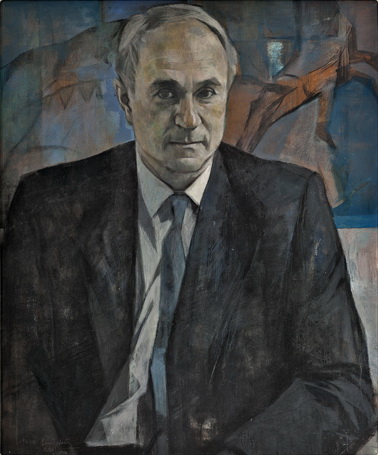
- Born: 5 January 1946 (age 80); Barcelona
- Education: Universidad Complutense de Madrid
- Occupations: Historian, Prehistorian, Perpetual keeper of antiquities of the "Real Academia de la Historia

Martín Almagro Gorbea (born 5 January 1946 in Barcelona) is a Spanish prehistorian.

He is a professor in prehistory, Ph.D. in history by the "Universidad Complutense de Madrid" with extraordinary prize.

Amalgro Gorbea was elected to medalla nº 11 of the Real Academia de la Historia on 17 February 1995 and he took up his seat on 17 November 1996. Perpetual keeper of antiquities of the Real Academia de la Historia.

In 1998 he became the Director of the National Archaeological Museum succeeding María del Carmen Pérez Díe.

Majoring in the early history of the Iberian Peninsula and Western Europe, Tartessos, Iberian and Celtic, Ethnogenesis, process of acculturation, Museology, Excavations and Cultural Heritage.

== Academic Curriculum ==
- Director of the Archaeological Museum of Ibiza.1969-70
- Professor, Department of Prehistory at the Complutense University.1968-76
- Keeper of the National Archaeological Museum.1970-76
- Professor and Director of the University of Valencia.1976-80
- Director of the Spanish School of History and Archeology in Rome.1979-83
- Professor at the Universidad Complutense de Madrid, Doctor in History.1981 -
- Academician of the Royal Academy of History, where he serves as Anticuario perpetuo (keeper of antiquities).1996-
- Director of the National Archaeological Museum.1998-99
- commissioner of
  - The Celts and Vettones exhibition (Ávila, 2001)
  - Hispania, the legacy of Rome (Zaragoza-Mérida, 1998),
  - Treasures of the "Real Academia de la Historia" (Madrid, 2001).

=== Other ===
- Academician of the Academy of Art and History of San Damaso, his inaugural lecture, was "España desde la prehistoria".
- Member of the Permanent Council of the Union Internationale des Sciences Prehistoriques et Protohistoriques.
- Member of the Royal Basque Society of Friends of the Country, (read his speech income in this society in 2008), 'The origins of the Basques'.

== Magazines and publications ==
Founder-Director of the magazine Complutum, of the Universidad Complutense of Madrid, Saguntum of the University of Valencia and currently directs Bibliotheca Archaeologica Hispana, Antiquaria Hispanica (born 1999), Catalog Cabinet of Antiquities (born 1998) and the Bibliotheca Hispana numismatica (born 2005), of the Royal Academy of History.

== Books ==
- Los orígenes de los vascos. Martín Almagro Gorbea (aut.). DELEGACIÓN EN CORTE. Departamento de Publicaciones, 2008. ISBN 978-84-89318-11-3
- La necrópolis de Medellín. I-III (Bibliotheca Archaeologica Hispana 26,1-3) Madrid, 2006–2008. (editor, director y coauthor con J. Jiménez Ávila, A. J. Lorrio, A. Mederos y M. Torres). ISBN 978-84-95983-88-6
- Medallas Españolas. Catálogo del Gabinete de Antigüedades de la Real Academia de la Historia. Madrid, 2005 (695 p. + 32 láms.) (editor y coautor con Mª Cruz Pérez Alcorta y T. Moneo). ISBN 84-95983-68-0
- Prehistoria. Antigüedades Españolas I. Real Academia de la Historia, Catálogo del Gabinete de Antigüedades. Madrid, 2004, 451 p. (editor y coautor con D. Casado, F. Fontes, A. Mederos, y M. Torres). ISBN 84-95983-46-X
- Segobriga. Guía del Parque Arqueológico. Madrid 55 p. (con Juan Manuel Abascal y Rosario Cebrián)
- Epigrafía Prerromana. Real Academia de la Historia, Catálogo del Gabinete de Antigüedades, Madrid, 2003, 544 p.
- Santuarios urbanos en el mundo ibérico. Martín Almagro Gorbea, Teresa Moneo. Real Academia de la Historia, 2000. ISBN 84-89512-58-2
- Las fíbulas de jinete y de caballito: aproximación a las élites ecuestres y su expansión en la Hispania céltica. Martín Almagro Gorbea, Mariano Torres Ortiz. Institución Fernando el Católico, 1999. ISBN 84-7820-466-0
- El rey-lobo de La Alcudia de Ilici. Alicante, 1999. 52 p. MU-2383-1999
- Las fíbulas de jinete y de caballito: aproximación a las élites ecuestres y su expansión en la Hispania céltica. Martín Almagro Gorbea, Mariano Torres Ortiz. Institución Fernando el Católico, 1999. ISBN 84-7820-466-0
- Segóbriga y su conjunto arqueológico. Martín Almagro Gorbea, Juan Manuel Abascal Palazón. Real Academia de la Historia, 1999. ISBN 84-89512-29-9
- Archivo del Gabinete de Antigüedades: catálogo e índices. Martín Almagro Gorbea, Jesús R. Alvarez Sanchís. Real Academia de la Historia, 1998. ISBN 84-89512-27-2
- Excavaciones en el cerro Ecce Homo: (Alcalá de Henares, Madrid). Martín Almagro Gorbea, Dimas Fernández-Galiano. Madrid: Diputación Provincial. Servicios de Extensión Cultural y Divulgación, D.L. 1980. ISBN 84-500-4028-5
- El bronce final y el periodo orientalizante en Extremadura. Martín Almagro Gorbea. Madrid: Consejo Superior de Investigaciones Científicas. Instituto Español de Prehistoria, 1977. ISBN 84-00-03737-5
- Los campos de túmulos de Pajaroncillo (Cuenca). Excavaciones Arqueológicas en España 83, Madrid 1974, 131 pág.
- La necrópolis de "Las Madrigueras". Carrascosa del Campo (Cuenca) (Bibliotheca Praehistorica Hispana X). Madrid, 1969. 165 p.
- Estudios de Arte rupestre Nubio. I. Sites in East Nile riverside, Nag Kolorodna and Kars Ibrim. (Memorias de la Misión Arqueológica Española en Egipto X), Madrid 1968 (with M. Almagro).

== Works summary ==
Magazine articles (351) Contributions in collective works (188) Books (20) Thesis Directed (39) Coordination (58 publications)
