= Hispanoamérica, canto de vida y esperanza =

- Theatrical release poster
- Directed by: José Luis López-Linares
- Written by: José Luis López-Linares; Víctor Escribano
- Edited by: José Luis López-Linares
- Music by: Jorge Magaz
- Release date: 2024
- Running time: 115 minutes
- Country: Spain
- Language: Spanish
- Budget: €220,000

Hispanoamérica, canto de vida y esperanza (Hispanic America, a song of life and hope) is a Spanish historical documentary film. It was directed by José Luis López-Linares and released in 2024.

== Contents ==
The documentary follows its previous chapter España, la primera globalización (2021) and gathers 50 experts from multiple Hispanic countries with the goal of refuting the "Spanish Black Legend" and offer "a renewed, truthful and visually powerful about how Spanish America actually emerged and developed". Its title is a reference to Nicaraguan poet Rubén Darío's work Cantos de vida y esperanza.

== People interviewed ==
- Rafael Aita "Capitán Perú"
- Alfonso Borrego
- Úrsula Camba Ludlow
- Ximena Carcelén
- Antonio Cordero
- Susana Cordero
- Mamela Fiallo
- Marcelo Gullo
- Carmen Iglesias
- Guadalupe Jiménez Codinach
- Enrique Krauze
- Carlos Leánez Aristimuño
- Patricio Lons
- Raquel Maldonado
- Angélica Montes-Cruz
- Jorge Moreno
- Ramón Mujica Pinilla
- Dalmacio Negro Pavón
- Faustino Núñez
- Francisco Núñez del Arco
- Elisa Queijeiro
- Aníbal Romero
- Martín F. Ríos Saloma
- Adelaida Sagarra Gamazo
- Aurelio Valarezco
- Juan Valderrama
- Juan Manuel Zunzunegui

== Production ==
Like its predecessors, Hispanoamérica was produced mostly through a crowdfunding campaign, receiving €222,000 from 4,000 users since the beginning of the project in 2022. It was shot in Spain, Ecuador, Perú, Bolivia, México and the United States.

== Release ==
The documentary's premiere, which was attended by King Felipe VI of Spain, introduced it among the ten biggest box office successes of the year in Spain despite its limited distribution in only 60 theaters. It grossed €93,908 the first week, becoming the most watched documentary of the year in Spain.
