= Fidel Fita =

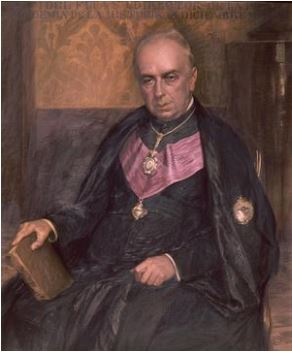
Fidel Fita; portrait by Isidoro Lozano (c.1895)

Fidel Fita Colomé or, in Catalan, Fidel Fita i Colomer (31 December 1835, Arenys de Mar - 13 January 1918, Madrid) was a Spanish-Catalonian archaeologist, philologist, and historian.

== Biography ==
Born to a newly bourgeois family, at the age of ten he was sent to study grammar in Barcelona. In 1850, at the age of fifteen, he became a Jesuit. After studying at several of the order's other institutions, including one in Nivelles, Belgium, where he studied rhetoric, he went to Loyola in 1853, to become a Professor of the humanities and Greek.

During the Revolution of 1854, he went into exile in France, returning in 1857 to take up a post as Professor of Latin and French at the Colegio de Carrión de los Condes in Palencia. From 1860 to 1866, he lived in León, where he taught theology and began his investigations into archaeology, history, and epigraphy. This led to his being named Vice-President of the "Comisión de Monumentos de León", in which position he met the architect, Eduardo Saavedra, with whom he would maintain a lifelong personal and professional friendship. During those years, he made a special effort to identify signs of Roman presence in the area.

In 1866, his order transferred him back to Catalonia. Then, two years later, he was forced into exile again, due to the "Glorious Revolution". Once more, he went to France, not returning until 1870 and, after living in several places, settling in Bañolas. This time, he focused on finding and interpreting Hebrew inscriptions in Girona; maintaining a correspondence with the archaeologist, Juan de Dios de la Rada, who was studying the mysterious sculptures that had been found near Cerro de los Santos.

He was named an Academician at the Real Academia de la Historia in 1877; settling in Madrid, where he lived for over thirty years. He would eventually publish over 700 articles in the Boletín de la Real Academia de la Historia, a third of which deal with epigraphy. Most of the world's experts on that subject were his friends or acquaintances; notably Emil Hübner, who was preparing a supplement to the Corpus Inscriptionum Latinarum. Fita was one of his primary informants on the project.

In 1912, following the death of Marcelino Menéndez Pelayo, he was named Director of the Academia; a position he held until his death.

== Sources ==
- Juan Manuel Abascal Palazón, Fidel Fita (1835-1918): su legado documental en la Real Academia de la Historia, Real Academia de la Historia, 1999 ISBN 978-84-89512-20-7 (Google Books)
- José Ferrándiz, Sotanas conocidas. Semblanzas de eclesiásticos españoles contemporáneos bajo cualquier concepto notables. Madrid: Tipografía de la Sociedad de Publicaciones Históricas, 1913.
