= Panhispanism =

Political ideology aiming for unification of Hispanic countries

Hispanic flag

Panhispanism or pan-Hispanism (Spanish: panhispanismo), sometimes just called hispanism (Spanish: hispanismo), is an ideology advocating for social, economic, and political cooperation, as well as often political unification, of the Hispanic world.

Panhispanism is notably characterized by its history of adaptation to all sides of the political spectrum while retaining its core tenet of Hispanic unity and its anti-Americanism. It has been present consistently in literature, revolutionary movements, and political institutions.

A variant of the ideology focuses specifically on projects of Hispanic American unity (the Patria Grande), to the exclusion of Hispanic areas outside the Americas.

== Background ==
The Spanish colonization of America began in 1492 and ultimately was part of a larger historical process of world colonialism through which various European powers incorporated a considerable amount of territory and peoples in the Americas, in Asia, and in Africa between the 15th and the 20th centuries. Hispanic America became the main part of the vast Spanish Empire.

Due to Napoleon's invasion of Spain from 1808 to 1814 and the consequent chaos, the dismemberment of the Spanish Empire was initiated as American territories began to move towards independence. The only remaining Spanish holdings in the Americas were Cuba and Puerto Rico by 1830 until the 1898 Spanish–American War.

== History ==
=== Precursors: anti-Spanish Hispanic-American unity projects ===
During the Spanish American wars of independence in the early 19th century, Simón Bolívar, Francisco de Miranda, and other rebel leaders aimed for the formation of a united Hispanic-American republic, which failed to materialize. The nascent revolutionary states with a less broader scope, namely the Federal Republic of Central America, Gran Colombia, and the United Provinces of the Río de la Plata, as well as the Peru–Bolivian Confederation later on, all ended up collapsing into the smaller modern countries which are still in existence today. The Congress of Panama (1826) sought to organize a league of Hispanic-American republics primarily as defense against Spain; similarly, this project never materialized.

=== 19th century emergence and initial collapse ===
Panhispanism inclusive of Spain first surged during the 19th century as a reaction to the disintegration of the Spanish Empire, but this trend lasted only a few decades.

By the mid-19th century, Spain and the Hispanic-American republics had largely stabilized their relations. The focus of panhispanists at this time was the promotion of a "spiritual and cultural" brotherhood between Spain and the republics, rather than a political reconquest of the old imperial territories.

During this period, the growing expansionist ambitions of the United States, including its imperialistic attitude towards Latin America, resulted in the development of anti-American sentiment as a key part of panhispanism. This was especially amplified following Mexico's defeat in the Mexican–American War (1846–1848) and subsequent American expansionism in Central America via the initiatives of William Walker (1856–1857). Spain sought to capitalize on these crises by encouraging Hispanic solidarity against the United States.

The predominant panhispanist writers of this time were Francisco Muñoz del Monte, from the Dominican Republic, and José María Samper, from Colombia.

This brief surge of panhispanism was dealt a severe blow and largely discredited following the aggressive military interventions of the Spaniards themselves in Hispanic America, namely the occupation of the Dominican Republic (1861–1865) and the Chincha Islands War (1865–1879) against Peru, Chile, Ecuador, and Bolivia.

=== 20th century revival ===
Panhispanism was revived years after its first "death" in the early 20th century. At this time, the Cuban writer and anthropologist Fernando Ortiz characterized panhispanism as a Hispanic "integration movement" fundamentally opposed to pan-Americanism, seen as a tool of United States hegemony.

As had been done in the previous century, panhispanic intellectuals in both Spain and the Americas were making arguments that the movement should advocate for a "fraternal" union rather than Spanish hegemony over, or reconquest of, Hispanic America. This line of thought and its positive influence was compared to the ongoing rapprochement between Britain and the United States.

From 1925 to 1938, Ramón Menéndez Pidal, director of the Royal Spanish Academy (Real Academia Española) contributed to panhispanism by promoting the unity of the Spanish language while simultaneously recognizing the legitimacy of the Latin American dialects and arguing that they were not inferior to the Spanish spoken in Spain. He is seen as having helped prevent a potential fragmentation of the Spanish language.

In 1932, the Uruguayan poet Juana de Ibarbourou organized a contest for the creation of a flag to represent all Hispanics. The winning design was by Ángel Camblor, an Uruguayan army captain, and was raised in the capital Montevideo. Ironically, it was also adopted the next year, 1933, as the "Flag of the Americas" by the Seventh Assembly of the Pan-American Conference, a project of the United States.

Between 1940 and 1960, new currents started to influence Chilean nationalism by the promotion of falangist and corporatist concepts. Inspired by the Franco regime, there was a Hispanist shift. Traditionalist professor Jaime Eyzaguirre published the magazine Estudios (1938–1954), of a corporativist, nationalist, and Catholic ideology, with collaborators Mario Góngora and right-wing professor Julio Philippi Izquierdo. The theologician and philosopher Osvaldo Lira published his most important works during this period: Nostalgia de Vázquez de Mella (English: Nostalgia of Vasquez de Mella) (1942), La vida en torno (1948), and Hispanidad y mestizaje, y otros ensayos (1952) (English: Hispanic and Mestizo, and other essays). The nationalist lawyer Jorge Prat founded the magazine Estanquero in 1948, from a strong hispanist and corporatist point of view.

==== Use by Francoist Spain ====
During the regime of Francisco Franco in Spain (1936–1975), panhispanism was integrated into the governing Falangist ideology, which aligned itself with fascism. Falangist panhispanism was a major departure from earlier, more liberal strains of the panhispanic movement, and instead emphasized anti-democratic ideals, traditional values, and the role of Roman Catholicism. During this time, the prominent Falangist thinker Ramiro de Maeztu characterized Hispanics, as a cultural and spiritual body of people, as inherently incompatible with democracy and liberalism. Falangist panhispanism was influential in the media of Hispanic America but was also received with mixed attitudes.

In 1940 Franco established the Council of the Hispanidad, a government agency which was in charge of relations with the Hispanic-American countries, and was labelled as pro-fascist and anti-American. This Council was dissolved in 1945, following the end of the Second World War.

=== Present-day developments ===
In the Hispanic world today, panhispanism remains largely anti-American and opposes "Anglo-Saxon" influence in general in Hispanic territories, viewing it as imperialist.

Social media has also been identified as a catalyst for a resurgence in panhispanic sentiment. YouTubers such as "Brigada Antifraude" and the communist Santiago Armesilla are popular proponents of panhispanism, having channels with thousands of views and subscribers, in which they defend the idea of a Hispanic union and attack the Black Legend.

In Puerto Rico, there exists a movement to reunify the island with Spain as its proposed 18th autonomous region, and in Peru, right-wing protestors have been seen carrying the old flag of the Spanish Empire. A growing and controversial movement in the Philippines, whose supporters are dubbed "the Hispanistas", advocates the restoration of Spanish as an official language of the country and in general a closer integration with the Hispanic world.

In 2022, the organization Parlamento Global Hispano (English: Hispanic Global Parliament) was created as an international Hispanic provisional assembly aiming to move the Hispanic world towards economic and political integration; its first elections were held from September to October.

== See also ==
- Creole nationalism
- Flag of the Hispanic People
- Hispanic
- Hispanidad
- Hispanism
- La Raza
- Patria Grande
- Spanish American wars of independence
