= Santiago Armesilla =

Spanish political analyst (born 1982)

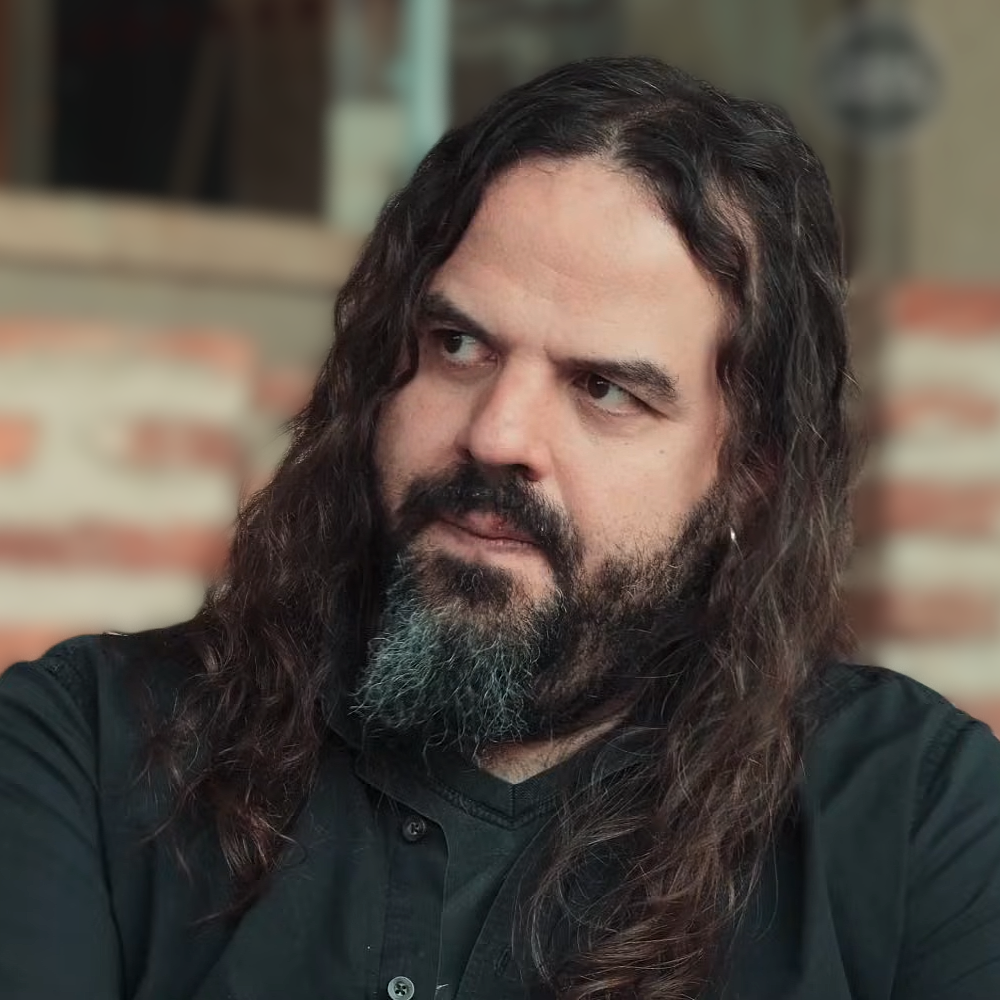
- Born: Santiago Javier Armesilla Conde; January 18, 1982 (age 44); Madrid, Spain
- Education: Colegio San Viator (Madrid); Complutense University of Madrid
- Occupations: Political analyst; political commentator
- Political party: Vanguardia Española
- Movement: Panhispanism; communism; materialism; philosophical materialism
- Website: www.armesilla.org

Santiago Javier Armesilla Conde (born January 18, 1982) is a Spanish political analyst with a PhD in economics, who hosts the political show on YouTube which shares his name. He has also published books such as El marxismo y la cuestión nacional española. Politically, Armesilla has been described as on the traditionalist side of Spanish communism.

Due to his pan-Hispanic and pan-Iberophonic views Armesilla has a strong stance against the Anglosphere.

== Early life and education ==
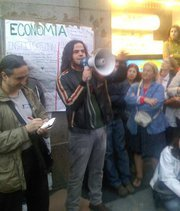
Armesilla in 2014

Armesilla was born in 1982 in Madrid. Armesilla first studied in San Viator School and he graduated from the Complutense University of Madrid with a doctorate in Political and Social Economy in the Framework of Globalization.

== Work ==
Armesilla spent a year and a half in Argentina through a postdoctoral scholarship from CONICET. He was a researcher at the Euro-Mediterranean University Institute and is the author of ten books on Marxism and political economy. Now he is the director of Beatriz Galindo-La Latina Institute where he teaches a course on Political Materialism. He is also the secretary-general of Vanguardia Española, the Spanish section of the Vanguardias Iberófonas, an intercontinental pan-iberophone socialist movement that seeks:

...the unity of the Socialist Vanguard of Spanish and Portuguese-speaking countries; Iberofonía is composed of more than 861 million people who speak the only two universal languages mutually understandable by up to 89%, and who in turn share a common culture, traditions and ways of life, without denying the particularities of each of the nations of the Iberofonía.

In his 2020 book La vuelta del revés de Marx, Armesilla lays the groundwork for a novel revolutionary theory still in construction called "Political Materialism" (MatPol):

Resulting from the interweaving and fusion of Marx's Historical Materialism and [Gustavo] Bueno's Materialismo Filosófico, its objective is the material, plural, concrete, dialectical, historical and political understanding of reality, in view of its political implementation in a strong sense, in a nation-state of civilizational scale or imperio generador, in order to transform it [reality] in a radical sense at the largest possible zootropic-anthropic scale. Marx constructed his critique and his philosophical system by inverting Hegel, and Bueno did the same with Marx in order to purge Marxism from what were, according to him, the idealist components still present within it. Armesilla, for his part, proposes a reading of Marx through Bueno in order to, by fusing the two systems, recover the revolutionary core of Marxism.

In his 2024 book Lenin. El gran error que hizo caer la URSS, Armesilla presents an innovative Marxist critique of the right to self-determination, considering it to be a legal fiction and ideological strategy used to legitimize geopolitical intervention. He traces the genealogy of the idea of self-determination, from the Jewish idea of creation to its Anglo-Saxon liberal absorption via the Protestant Reformation concluding in the German Idealist and Romantic traditions and their influence on the early Russian Social Democratic Labour Party. His political critique echoes that of Marxist philosopher Rosa Luxemburg in her debate against Lenin but goes farther than Luxembourg in that he presents a systematic and materialist reconceptualization of the idea of nation and empire, and proposes a civilizational model of development (what he calls "continental platforms") closer to that favored by the post-Mao People's Republic of China.

== Views ==
Armesilla has been said by ABC to be grouped among Hispanic communists who are conservative in their defense of the nation, the family and the legacy of the Catholic Church (even embracing a catholic atheist label) but radically anti-capitalist (post-capitalist) in the political and economic spheres, with Miguel Riera, director of the publishing house El Viejo Topo, stating that the "rojipardo" label ("red-brown") means very little and applies to figures as disparate as "Manolo Monereo, Ana Iris Simón or Santiago Armesilla". Armesilla rejects the red-brown ideological label in favor of a more systematic taxonomy of the multiple generations of the political left (introduced by Gustavo Bueno in his book titled El mito de la izquierda), thereby overcoming, what he calls, the myth of "left unity".

Armesilla supports the transformation of Spain into a unicameral, centralized, presidentialist, secular, socialist republic. He also argues for the destruction of Spanish Socialist Workers' Party (PSOE), claiming it "breaks the national territory" and prevents workers from accessing economic resources. He supports illegalization of door-to-door proselytism and any organization that promotes "queer ideology", islamic fundamentalism and separatism, or that is close with George Soros's Open Society Foundation, the Friedrich Ebert Foundation and the Bertelsmann Foundation. He also supports Spain's exit from the Eurozone, European Union and NATO, and its integration into an intercontinental Iberofonía "as an alternative to Anglo-Germanic capitalism", which would encompass the Spanish and Portuguese-speaking worlds.
