= Antonio Blanco =

Antonio Blanco may refer to:

- Antonio Blanco (painter) (1912-1999), a painter of Spanish and American descent.
- Antonio Blanco Freijeiro (1923-1991), a Spanish archaeologist and historian.
- Antonio Blanco (footballer) (born 2000), Spanish footballer
