= El Príncipe Gitano =

Spanish flamenco singer (1928–2020)

- Born: Enrique Castellón Vargas; 7 April 1928; Valencia, Spain
- Died: 22 April 2020 (aged 92) Mandayona, Spain
- Genres: flamenco
- Occupations: Musician, composer
- Instrument: voice
- Years active: 1946-2000s

Enrique Castellón Vargas (7 April 1928 – 22 April 2020), better known as El Príncipe Gitano ("The Gypsy Prince") was a Spanish flamenco singer, actor and dancer. He was the brother of rumba singer Dolores Vargas "La Terremoto".

== Career ==
At the age of 14 he made his debut at the Teatro Calderón in Madrid in the same show as Lola Flores and very soon after he performed his first show, “Pinceladas”, becoming a great figure in Spanish song in the 1950s, despite the fact that his real passion was bullfighting, but he did not have success in that field.

His most famous song is "Obí, obá". He also made a peculiar version of the Elvis Presley song "In the Ghetto".

He died due to COVID-19 during the COVID-19 pandemic in Spain.

== Filmography ==
- Brindis al cielo (1954)
- Un heredero en apuros (1956)
- Veraneo en España (1956)
- El alma de la copla (1965)
- El milagro del cante (1967)
- Españolear (1969)
