= María del Pilar León-Castro Alonso =

Spanish archaeologist and historian (born 1946)

María del Pilar León-Castro Alonso (born 13 September 1946, in Seville) is a Spanish archaeologist and historian, as well as an academician of the Real Academia de la Historia.

In 1969, León-Castro Alonso graduated in arts from the University of Seville with honors and received her doctorate there in 1974. She studied under Antonio Blanco Freijeiro, and extended her studies in Bonn by a grant from the Alexander von Humboldt Foundation. She also spent two years conducting research at the Institute of Archaeology Rodrigo Caro Spanish National Research Council. Her research has included Roman Córdoba. Previously a professor at the Complutense University of Madrid, the University of Santiago de Compostela, the University of Cordoba, and the University Pablo de Olavide, she was as of 2016 a professor of archeology at the University of Seville.

León-Castro Alonso founded the magazine Romula which focuses on the archeology of Roman ruins in the Iberian Peninsula. She is a member of the German Archaeological Institute and an academic of the Real Academia de Bellas Artes de Santa Isabel de Hungría. León-Castro Alonso was elected to medalla nº 9 of the Real Academia de la Historia on 13 April 2012; she took up her seat on 19 May 2013.
