= Marxist–Leninist Party (Communist Reconstruction) =

Political party in Spain

Communist Reconstruction Reconstrucción Comunista
- Abbreviation: RC
- Secretary-General: Julián de Soria
- Founder: Roberto Vaquero
- Founded: 2009
- Registered: 6 October 2014
- Split from: Communist Party of the Peoples of Spain
- Youth wing: Young Guard (Bolshevik)
- Ideology: Communism; Marxism–Leninism; Anti-revisionism
- Political position: Far-left
- National affiliation: Workers' Front
- Colours: Red; Gold; Green

Party flag

Website
- https://reconstruccioncomunista.es/

Communist Reconstruction (Spanish: Reconstrucción Comunista, RC), previously known as Marxist-Leninist Party (Communist Reconstruction) (Spanish: Partido Marxista-Leninista (Reconstrucción Comunista), is a Marxist–Leninist political party in Spain officially registered since 2014.

== History ==
=== Early years and consolidation ===
Logo from 2009 to 2026.

The party's history began in 2009 under the name of Communist Reconstruction (RC). It was formed by a small group of militants from the Collectives of Communist Youth, the youth wing of the Communist Party of the Peoples of Spain at that time. The party's main activity in the early years was limited to the province of Madrid, and was based mainly on student unionism in the universities, communist training, support for the Kurdish community, and activism against the Turkish government of Recep Tayyip Erdoğan. On 14 April 2009, the party broke into the traditional demonstration for the Third Republic in the city of Madrid, carrying out a parade of combative aesthetics in honor of the fallen anti-fascists of the Civil War. Since then, every year the party organizes a parade in which more than a thousand people participated in 2019.

Between the years 2012–2014, the party increased its work in the international arena, supporting some anti-repressive causes in Iran and Ecuador, as well as the Naxalite Insurgency in India. Over time, the party broke relations with the Maoist organizations that supported this movement. The party also participated in the general strikes that characterized the 2010–2012 period, and supported the creation of platforms against repression after the considerable increase in police charges and arrests during the peak of the mobilizations. In 2013, the party held its Second Congress, in which of Maoism was criticized as an anti-Marxist current and took an anti-imperialist position regarding the US and China-Russia as "two reactionary political-economic blocs" and "contrary to progress' of the peoples".

On 8 March 2013, the party made public the creation of its youth wing, the Young Guard (Bolshevik). On 22 March 2013, the party participated in the Marches of Dignity, while forming a "Combative and class" bloc denouncing the supposed "inter-class" and "reformist" tint that the mobilizations had acquired, a block in which other leftist organizations participated. During the years 2013 and 2014, the party managed to spread to new regions, such as Valencia, Castellón, the Basque Country, Cuenca, and Jaén, among others. On 10 April 2015, the III Congress took place, in which the party was refounded as PML (RC), thus formalizing the qualitative change experienced in the organization and its extension to new areas in the rest of Spain, such as Barcelona or Tarragona.

=== Temporary party ban ===
In December 2014, two PML (RC) militants volunteered for the International Liberation Battalion to fight Daesh in the Syrian civil war. After their return to Spain in July 2015, they were arrested, and accused of being part of the Kurdistan Workers' Party (PKK), considered a terrorist organization by the European Union. Both they and their party denied these accusations. In their statements, they stated that they worked together with the People's Defense Units and that the decision was totally individual and voluntary. On 27 January 2016, due to the police collaboration of one of the brigade members, Operation Valle was carried out, ordered by the Investigating Court No. 6 of the National High Court, instructed by Judge Eloy Velasco. Eight PML (RC) militants and a citizen of Kurdish origin were arrested, accused of criminal organization and collaboration with a terrorist group.

In addition to the arrests, the National Court estimated the suspension of PML (RC) activity as a precautionary measure for one year, the closure of all its offices and imprisonment of a citizen of Kurdish origin and two militants of the party, among them the secretary general, Roberto Vaquero Arribas, who was imprisoned in solitary confinement for nearly two months until, due to lack of evidence, he was released. All the defendants are at liberty, pending the resolution of the appeal to the Supreme Court of Spain that sought the acquittal of the defendants.

=== Post-illegalization activity and Worker's Front ===
After a year, the precautionary measure was not extended by the National High Court and the PML (RC) was acquitted of all the charges against it. The party resumed its public activity by carrying out a parade in support of a new republic on 8 April 2017. In 2018, the PML (RC) created the Workers' Front (FO, Frente Obrero) as a front organisation and electoral vehicle. The Workers' Front gained media attention due to confronting prominent left-wing politicians, such as Íñigo Errejón, Pablo Iglesias, and Irene Montero. It also gained attention thanks to the Workers' Hope (Esperanza Obrera) initiative in the city of Valencia where after occupying a building they gave food to several hundred individuals as well as accommodation and labor advice. The Worker's Front competed in elections, and gained one seat in the municipality of Mandayona in the 2023 Spanish local elections. It also contested in the 2023 Spanish general election, fielding candidates in almost all constituencies. The party gained 46,274 votes (0.19%) and no seats.

In May 2026 Julián de Soria was elected as the new secretary-general as successor of Roberto Vaquero. The party als returned to its earlier name Communist Reconstruction.

== Ideology ==
The party has been described as far-left and Marxist–Leninist. It was described as anti-revisionist, republican, and patriotic socialist. It "adheres to Stalinist and Hoxhaist communism, reflecting its radical ideological stance within the left-wing political spectrum". The ABC described the party as "ideologically communist and markedly anti-revisionist". It has become notorious for its nationalism, anti-feminism, and open criticism of mass immigration and gender policies, along with denouncing Islamization and identity politics. As a result, its ideology is also described as a "hybrid of classical communism and working-class nationalism". The party's leader describes himself as a "patriotic Marxist".

The main goals of PML (RC) are to fight for a more just society, the elimination of labor exploitation, and the defense of workers' rights. The party's demands include abolishing the Spanish monarchy, leaving the European Union (EU) and NATO, building a workers' front, and creating a federal Spanish republic "in the style of Enver Hoxha's Albania". On the Soviet Union (USSR), the party declared: "The Soviet Union was a workers' democracy. A hundred thousand times more democratic than any of these mediocre European democracies could ever be. The USSR was a dictatorship for exploiters, landowners, and foreign powers." It seeks to represent a radical alternative to the Spanish Socialist Workers' Party (PSOE) and Spanish Communist Party (PCE), accusing them of betraying socialist ideals. The party is known for slogans such as "communists defend the homeland, rats sell it out" and "we will not allow leftism to destroy the workers' movement".

It reveres Joseph Stalin's USSR and Communist Albania under Enver Hoxha, and advocates communism based on the Soviet and Albanian model. The party postulates a Marxist-Leninist system "that scorns any form of market or private property; the creation of a single-party republican state with a Jacobin structure, without territorial tensions; and the rejection of feminism and 'queer' theories, environmentalism and other banners of the modern left". It argues that the only acceptable form of government is the dictatorship of the proletariat, while LGBT or gender postulates are "nothing more than a simple tweakment of a [capitalist] system" that cannot stand and must be destroyed.

The party opposes the "woke left", denouncing social progressivism and multiculturalism. It declared: "It is our duty to say enough is enough and that we are not willing to accept the idea that feminism, environmentalism, and other ridiculous fads of the system should be the guiding principle for the struggle of the working class and not what it has always been: Marxism-Leninism." The party also promotes patriotism, arguing: "(The youth) are being denied the right to a national identity. Today, to be patriotic is to be fascist. In other words, high school kids can no longer feel proud of their culture or their country, and class consciousness is even less prevalent." It calls for deporting illegal immigrants and 'radical Muslims' from Spain, "imposing a naval blockade" and eliminating visas. Vaquero argued: "Immigration policy is filthy; it goes against the country's interests. It seems we can't talk about the violence perpetrated by immigrants. If the gang is from Seville, the case and the names are everywhere; if it's Moroccan, no one talks about it. ... The immigration threshold has been exceeded when people begin to segregate themselves and live on the margins of society." He denounced feminism as "affirmative action for an elite of women" and proposed to "overturn all the feminist laws that have been passed by the Ministry of Equality".

The PML (RC) argues for a "more traditionalist left" that abandons "the false myth of progressivism". The party argues that through picking up causes such as feminism, animal rights, sexual diversity, and environmentalism, the left-wing movement lost its focus, warning of a "diversity trap" that "if we are all an endless sum of specificities, then there can be no us". It states that social progressivism led the left-wing movements to soften their discourse and move "from poor neighborhoods to affluent areas", abandoning the working class and thus leaving an opening for right-wing populism. The party's leader Vaquero also asserted: "Instead of self-analysis and self-criticism, the left insults the people who don't vote for them. In Spain, the parties of change spend their time between Lavapiés and Ciudad Universitaria and have no contact with the workers." The PML (RC) accuses the "woke left" of assimilating itself into the "antithetical" capitalist culture of "transgressive consumption, individualism, ostentation, consumerism, conformism and selfishness", and declared: "Feminism, queer theory, individualist environmentalism, etc. are fads promoted by the system to distance young people and workers in general from what truly makes the transformation of society possible: the class struggle."

According to El Confidencial, the party "accuses Irene Montero, Pablo Echenique, and Ione Belarra of betraying the workers, defends a united and strong Spain, advocates direct confrontation with Morocco, and frontally combats queer feminism". The party is closely linked to the Revolutionary Antifascist Patriotic Front (FRAP), and former FRAP members regularly attend the congresses of PML (RC). Along with FRAP, the party also has ties with the PKK, and was involved in a network to recruit militias for the Kurdistani party. The party's members, along with Vaquero himself, fought in the Syrian civil war as volunteers of Rojava, with the main goal being a struggle against the Islamic State. The party is also "virulently anti-Zionist".

== See also ==
- List of anti-revisionist groups
- List of political parties in Spain
