= Roberto Vaquero =

Spanish politician

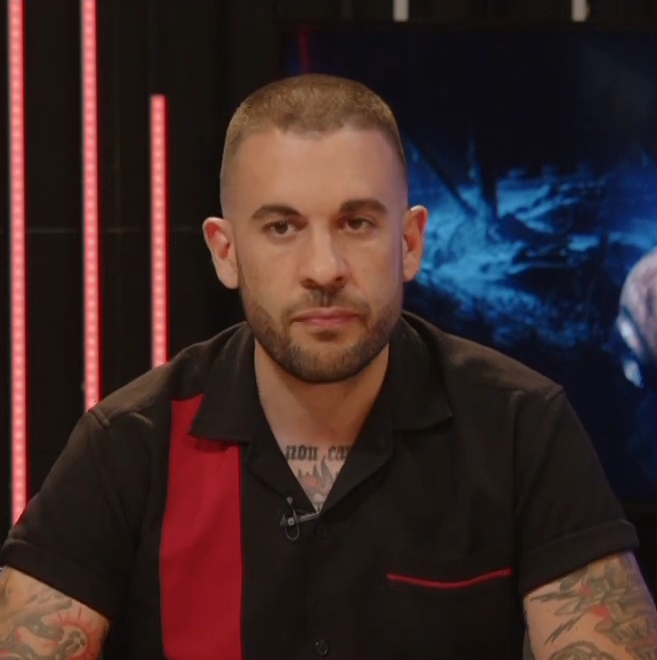
- Vaquero in 2023

Leader of the Workers' Front
- Incumbent
- Assumed office 14 June 2022

Secretary General of the Marxist–Leninist Party (Communist Reconstruction)
- In office 2009 – May 2026
- Preceded by: Post established
- Succeeded by: Julián de Soria

Personal details
- Born: 21 May 1986 (age 40) Madrid, Spain
- Party: Workers' Front (since 2018); Marxist–Leninist Party (Communist Reconstruction) (since 2009)
- Other political affiliations: Collectives of Communist Youth (2007–2009); Communist Youth Union of Spain (2002–2007)
- Education: Complutense University of Madrid

Roberto Vaquero Arribas (born 21 May 1986) is a Spanish political activist. He is the former secretary general of the Marxist–Leninist Party (Communist Reconstruction) (PML (RC)) and the current leader of the Workers' Front (FO). Vaquero supports Spanish republicanism, Spanish patriotism and socialism. He opposes mainstream left-wing parties such as the Spanish Socialist Workers' Party (PSOE) and Podemos.

== Biography ==
Vaquero was born in Madrid on 21 May 1986 and raised in the outskirt town of Pozuelo de Alarcón and the district of Moncloa-Aravaca. He was a childhood neighbour of politician Íñigo Errejón. Raised by conservative parents, he joined the Communist Youth Union of Spain (UJCE) at age 16.

Vaquero graduated in political sciences from the Complutense University of Madrid, where one of his lecturers was Pablo Iglesias Turrión, later founder of the left-wing party Podemos. Vaquero reflected in 2019 that he disliked Iglesias and labeled Iglesias as a "postmodernist" who he saw as no different to the centre-left Spanish Socialist Workers' Party (PSOE), alleging that Iglesias denied the existence of class war.

Vaquero worked with luggage at an airport and as a cinema usher, as well as owning an exotic pet shop in Leganés. He denied accusations that he used party funds to establish the business. After moving to Barcelona, Vaquero returned to Madrid to work in private security at nighttime entertainment venues. He is one of Spain's leading practitioners of Krav Maga.

In 2016, Vaquero was held in prison for 49 days before paying €6,000 in bail. He was accused of possession of explosives and membership of a criminal organisation collaborating with the Kurdistan Workers' Party (PKK), which is classed as a terrorist organisation in Spain. In October 2018, the Audiencia Nacional acquitted him of membership of a criminal organisation and of explosives offences, while rejecting a request from the Prosecution Ministry to ban his party, which had been suspended from activities during the legal process. He was convicted in the first instance of membership of a criminal group and weapons offences, and sentenced to two years and three months. In 2020, the Supreme Court of Spain reduced his sentence by one year, and as of December 2021 he was awaiting the result of his appeal to the Constitutional Court of Spain.

== Political views ==
Vaquero's political heroes are Joseph Stalin and Enver Hoxha. He proposes a one-party state with no private market or property. Vaquero's followers have been involved in escraches, or public heckling, of politicians such as Errejón, Iglesias and Yolanda Díaz whom they accuse of betraying the working class.

=== Constitutional issues ===
Vaquero opposes Catalan independence, proposing that it is supported by right-wing parties in Catalonia and would not change the lives of the poor. Unlike more mainstream forces of the far left in Spain, he supports Spanish patriotism.

Vaquero supports Spanish republicanism. He believes that it is impossible to achieve it without socialism and patriotism.

=== Social issues ===
Vaquero believes that the mainstream left-wing focuses of feminism, queer theory and environmentalism are distractions from the class war. He has called feminism "bourgeois and liberal" and believes that governments and corporations use it to divide the population. Vaquero believes that parties such as Podemos encourage such policies, as well as open borders, to promote consumerism. When asked in 2024 about how his party would help women, he said that he would eliminate the Ministry of Equality, punish rapists more harshly, cut migration, and police the streets.

Vaquero has said that feminism and transgender rights are contradictory because "they have gone from defending men-free spaces to being led by men in skirts who can even use their bathrooms". He also believes that feminists have not condemned "the increase in rapes committed by people from certain religious backgrounds".

At a 2023 event on Spain's migration crisis, hosted by journalist Arturo Pérez-Reverte, Vaquero said that he would use forces of the state to fight crime in dangerous neighbourhoods. Referring to the time he was arrested for planning to fight the Islamic State in Syria, he said "if I was willing to do that over there, imagine what I would be willing to do here".
