= Ramón Mujica Pinilla =

Peruvian anthropologist

Ramon Mujica Pinilla
- Born: Ramon Elias Manuel Mujica Pinilla; 1956 (age 69–70); Lima, Peru
- Education: National University of San Marcos; New College of Florida
- Spouse: Claudia Balarin
- Writing career
- Genres: History, Anthropology, Period Fiction

Ramon Elias Mujica Pinilla is a Peruvian anthropologist and served under three Presidents as Director of the National Library of Peru.

== Early life ==
Ramon Mujica Pinilla is the son of Peruvian diplomat, founding publisher of Expreso de Lima and collector Manuel Mujica Gallo and museum docent Marisa Pinilla Sánchez Concha, daughter of Antonio Pinilla Rambaud a Spanish Consul of Spain in Peru. He graduated from New College of Florida in Sarasota, Florida. He did his postgraduate work at the National University of San Marcos.

Se llama Ramon

== Career ==
He has written books on the mystical intellectual sources of St. Rose of Lima, the first saint of the Americas, and on the political dimensions of her Creole and Indian cult that prepared the ground for Peru's political Independence from Spain in 1821. Angeles Apocrifos en la America Virreinal includes an explanation for the late 17th century Andean sui generis baroque iconography of angels bearing musquets and Hebrew names. This angelic visionary iconography explained the Spanish Conquest of Peru in prophetic terms. It alluded to Inca Garcilaso de la Vega's belief that the Spanish conquistadors were divine messengers with thunderclaps sent by the Inca god Viracocha. Mujica coordinated the two volume set on "El Barroco Peruano" published by the Banco de Credito del Peru and the collection of essays "Vision y Simbolos: del virreinato criollo a la Republica Peruana", that includes contributions by David Brading, Teresa Gisbert de Mesa and Natalia Majluf, among others.

He is a numerary member (miembro de numero) of the Peruvian Academia Nacional de Historia and a "miembro correspondiente" from the Academia Nacional de Bellas Artes in Buenos Aires, Argentina. He has been appointed to be a board member of the Instituto Cervantes in 2014 filling a seat vacated by Isabella Allende.
