= Social rights (social contract theory) =

Unified concept of law

Social rights are rights arising from the social contract. For example, James Madison advocated that a right such as trial by jury arose neither from nature nor from a constitution of government, but from reified implications of the social contract. Social rights are very similar to political rights, and it can be understood that they are effectively the same concepts being exercised in a less extreme way.

Cécile Fabre argues that "it is legitimate to constrain democratic majorities, by way of the constitution, to respect and promote those fundamental rights of ours that protect the secure exercise of our autonomy and enable us to achieve well-being. Insofar as, by virtue of Ch. 1, social rights are such fundamental rights, it follows that they should be constitutionalized."

From a legal standpoint several approaches exercise and guarantee social rights; social rights under the constitution are rights of subjects or "subject rights". This assures that the public receives equal distribution of collective and private interests.
