= Enriqueta Vila Vilar =

Spanish historian

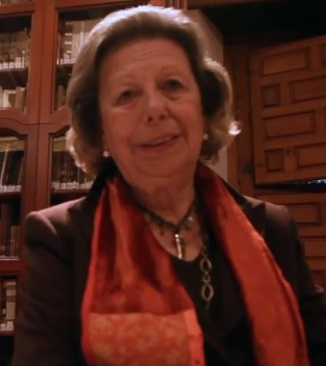
- Born: 14 May 1935 (age 91); Seville, Spain
- Awards: Medal of Andalusia; Gold Medal of the Province of Seville

Academic background
- Education: University of Seville

Academic work
- Discipline: history
- Institutions: Consejo Superior de Investigaciones Científicas
- Main interests: History of the Americas

Enriqueta Vila Vilar (born 1935) is a Spanish historian and researcher specialised on the history of the Americas.

== Biography ==
Born in 1935 in Seville, she earned a PhD in History of the Americas from the University of Seville in 1972. She worked as research lecturer at the Consejo Superior de Investigaciones Científicas (CSIC). She served as Seville municipal councillor in representation of the Andalucist Party (PA) and was charged with the municipal government area of Culture from 1991 to 1995. In 1995, she became the first female numerary member of the Real Academia Sevillana de Buenas Letras, serving as director of the learned society from 2011 to 2014.

In January 2012, she was elected to cover the vacant seat as numerary member of Royal Academy of History left by the decease of Juan Vernet; she assumed on 16 December 2012, reading a speech titled Hispanismo e hispanización: el Atlántico como nuevo Mare Nostrum.
