= Carlos Martínez Shaw =

Spanish historian

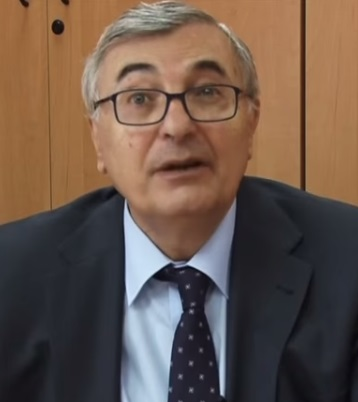
- Born: 28 June 1945; Seville
- Education: University of Seville, University of Barcelona
- Employers: National University of Distance Education; University of Barcelona; University of Santander
- Awards: honorary doctorate of the University of Lleida (2010)

Carlos Martínez Shaw (born 1945) is a Spanish historian, professor emeritus of early modern History at the National University of Distance Education (UNED). He is a member of the Royal Academy of History.

== Biography ==
Born at calle de Cano y Cueto 14, in Seville on 28 June 1945, he obtained a licentiate degree in History from the University of Seville in 1967. As he joined the University of Barcelona to work in a research project on the colonial trade, he began to write his PhD thesis under the guidance of Valentín Vázquez de Prada. He earned the PhD in 1973, reading a dissertation titled Cataluña en la carrera de Indias (1680-1756).

He has been a full professor at the University of Santander/Cantabria (1984–1986), the University of Barcelona (1986–1994) and the National University of Distance Education (1994–2015).

He assumed as numerary member of the Royal Academy of History (RAH) in November 2007, covering the chair #32 left vacant by the demise of Ángel Suquía, as he read a speech titled El sistema comercial español del Pacífico (1765–1820).

== Works ==
Author

- — (1981). Cataluña en la Carrera de Indias, 1680-1756. Barcelona: Editorial Crítica.

Co-author

- Martínez Shaw, Carlos; Alfonso Mola, Marina (2001). Felipe V. Madrid: Alianza Ediciones.

Editor

- Martínez Shaw, Carlos; Oliva Melgar, José María, eds. (2005). El sistema atlántico español (siglos XVII-XIX). Marcial Pons.
