= José Carlos Mainer =

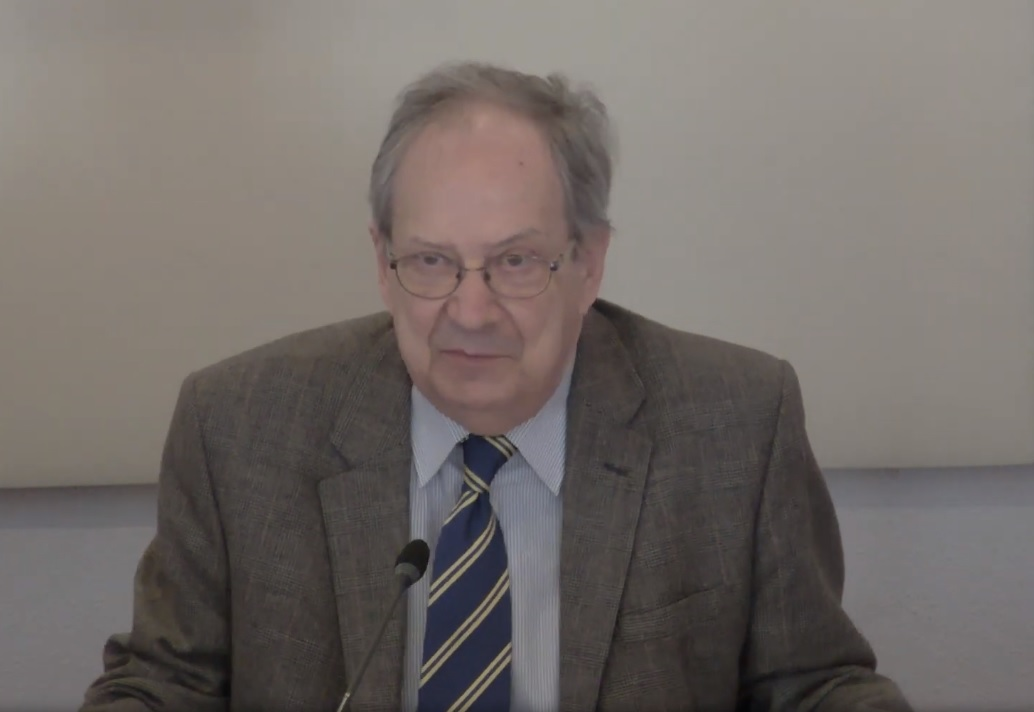
- Born: 11 July 1944; Zaragoza
- Occupation: Literary critic, literary historian
- Employer: Autonomous University of Barcelona; University of Barcelona; University of La Laguna; University of Zaragoza (1982–)
- Awards: Aragonese Literature Award (2002)
- Position held: professor

José Carlos Mainer Baqué (born 1944) is a Spanish historian of literature and literary critic, Professor Emeritus of the University of Zaragoza (UNIZAR). He is credited for his interdisciplinary scholar work intermingling studies on cultural and literary history.

== Biography ==
Born in 1944 in Zaragoza, he earned a PhD in Philosophy and Arts from the University of Barcelona (UB). Author of the pioneer Falange and literatura in 1971, his work regarding the study of literary fascism has been described as "exculpatory" towards the Falangist authors involved. He worked as lecturer at the UB, the Autonomous University of Barcelona (UAB) and the University of La Laguna (ULL) before obtaining a Chair in Literary History of the University of Zaragoza (UNIZAR) in 1982. He retired from teaching in 2011 and remains active as writer, critic and lecturer and collaborates with the newspapers El Pais and ABC.

== Awards and recognitions ==
In December 2002 he was granted by the Diputación General de Aragón the second edition of the 'Premio de las Letras Aragonesas'. In 2004 he was awarded with the journalism prize for the cultural, ethic and democratic values from the Basque Country by the newspaper El Correo. In 2011, in the year of his retirement as a professor at the University of Zaragoza, the book Para Mainer de sus amigos y compañeros de viaje has been edited.

== Works ==
Author

- — (1971). Falange y literatura. Barcelona: Labor. (Note: Reedited in 2013 by RBA.)
- — (1972). Literatura y pequeña burguesía en España.
- — (1975). La Edad de Plata.
- — (1989). Historia, literatura, sociedad.
- — (1989). La corona hecha trizas, 1930-1960. Barcelona: PPV.
- — (1994). De posguerra, 1951-1990. Barcelona: Crítica.
- — (2000). La escritura desatada. El mundo de las novelas.
- — (2003). La filología en el purgatorio. Los estudios literarios en torno a 1950. Barcelona: Crítica.
- — (2004). La doma de la quimera. Ensayos sobre nacionalismo y cultura en España. Madrid: Iberoamericana/Vervuert.
- — (2005). Tramas, libros, nombres: para entender la literatura española, 1944-2000. Barcelona: Anagrama.
- — (2006). Años de vísperas. La vida de la cultura española, 1931-1939. Madrid: Espasa-Calpe.
- — (2012). Pío Baroja. Madrid: Taurus.
- — (2014). Historia mínima de la literatura española. Madrid & México: Turner-El Colegio de México.

Director

- Mainer, José-Carlos, ed. (2010–2013). Historia de la literatura española. Barcelona: Crítica. (9 volumes)
