= Fernando García de Cortázar =

Spanish priest and historian (1942–2022)

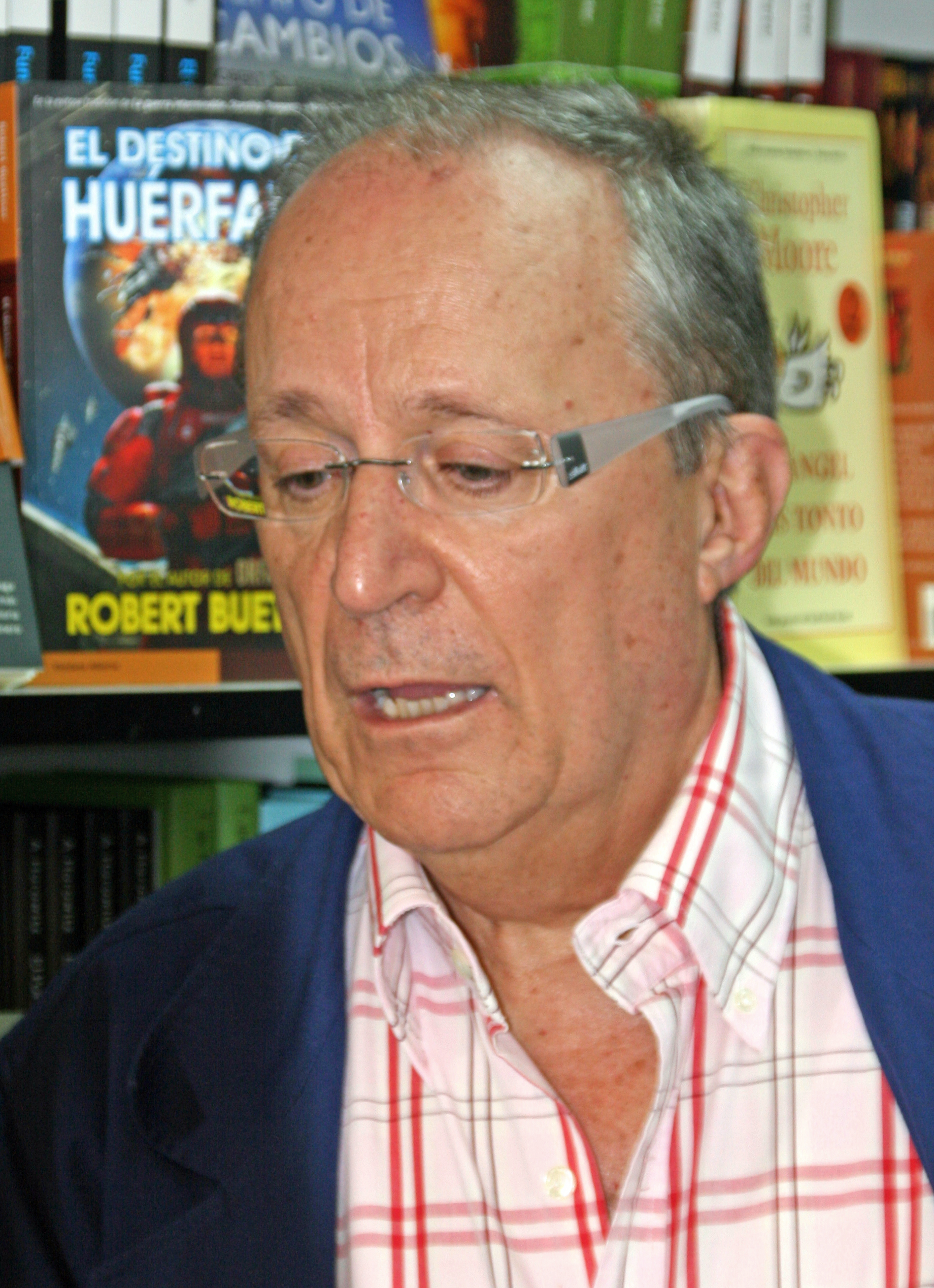
- García de Cortázar in 2008
- Born: Fernando García de Cortázar y Ruiz de Aguirre; 4 September 1942; Bilbao, Spain
- Died: 3 July 2022 (aged 79); Madrid, Spain
- Education: Autonomous University of Madrid
- Occupations: Priest, historian
- Employer: University of Deusto
- Organisation: Real Academia de la Historia

Fernando García de Cortázar y Ruiz de Aguirre (4 September 1942 – 3 July 2022) was a Spanish Jesuit priest and historian.
