= María del Carmen Pérez Díe =

Spanish Egyptologist, curator and researcher

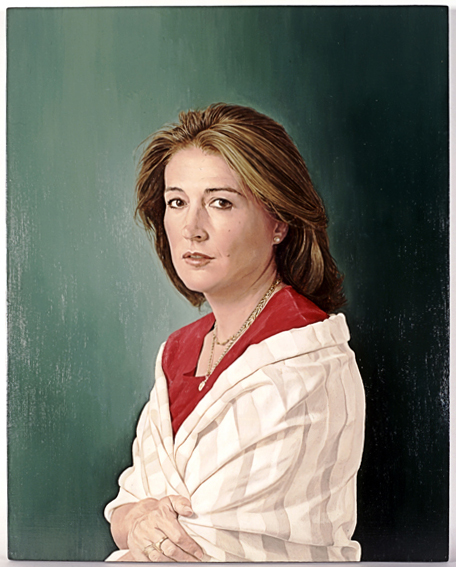
Portrait of María del Carmen Pérez Díe

María del Carmen Pérez Díe (born 1953) is a Spanish Egyptologist, curator and researcher. She has worked for the National Archaeological Museum of Spain as Curator Head of the Department of Egyptian Antiquities and the Middle East since 1980. Pérez Díe served as the museum's director between 1991 and 1997.

She is currently a member of various committees and associations such as the International pour L'Egyptologie Committee, the Spanish Association of Egyptology and the Spanish Committee for the rescue of Tiro.

== Career ==
Pérez Díe was born in 1953 in Madrid. Her mother was a history professor at the Autonomous University of Madrid. Pérez Díe's interest in Egypt came from a young age when her parents took her on a visit to the National Archaeological Museum of Spain. After specialising in Egyptology and Museum Studies in Cairo and Paris, Perez Díe continued her studies at the Complutense University of Madrid where she earned her doctorate with honours in Ancient History in 1990 and whose thesis "Heracleópolis Magna durante el Tercer Período Intermedio" was based on the site Heracleópolis which she has directed since 1984.

== Acknowledgements ==
She has received numerous awards including the National Prize of the Spanish Geographical Society, the Medal of Commendation of Number of the Order of Isabella the Catholic granted by the Ministry of Foreign Affairs and Cooperation in 2009 and the Gold Medal of the Supreme Council of Antiquities of Egypt the following year. Pérez Díe served on the jury for the Princess of Asturias Awards in the Social Sciences category from 2011 until 2014.
