= Boletín de la Real Academia de la Historia =

Spanish academic journal

Boletín de la Real Academia de la Historia is a Spanish academic journal published by the Real Academia de la Historia. It covers historical studies and reports of historical documents. The journal was established in 1871. Between 1883 and 1918, its editor-in-chief was Fidel Fita, who did much to consolidate the journal's reputation and published prolifically within the journal's pages.
