= Ana Iris Simón =

Spanish writer

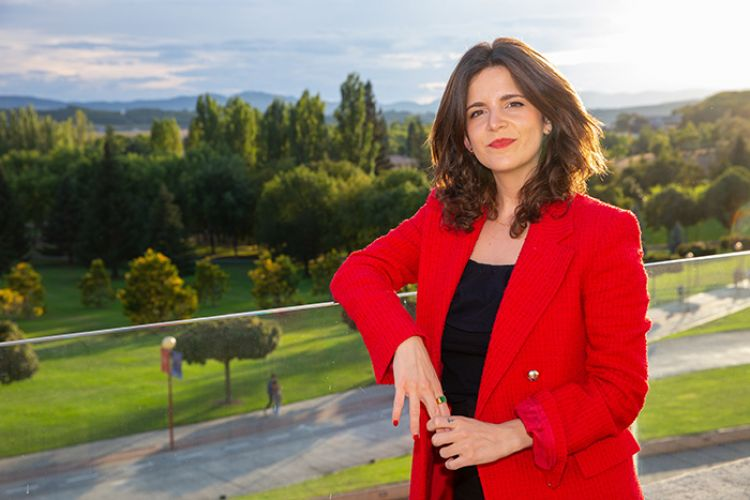
- Ana Iris Simón
- Born: 2 June 1991 (age 35); Campo de Criptana, Spain
- Education: King Juan Carlos University
- Occupation: Writer
- Writing career
- Notable work: Feria

Ana Iris Simón (Campo de Criptana, Ciudad Real, 2 June 1991) is a Spanish writer, best known for her autobiographical novel Feria.

== Biography ==
Simón was born in Campo de Criptana before moving to Noblejas and growing up in Ontígola after her parents moved there for work. She maintained a connection with Campo de Criptana because her four grandparents lived there.

She studied at Virgen del Rosario in Ontígola, Vicente Aleixandre in Aranjuez, and IES Alpajés before attending King Juan Carlos University to study audiovisual communications and journalism.

After living in Madrid and Ávila, she moved to Aranjuez, where she has two children with her partner, the political scientist Hasel-Paris Álvarez.

== Professional life ==
She served as editor of Telva and Vice España, where she wrote about politics, social rights, music, and gender, and was a screenwriter for Playz.

In October 2020, she published Feria, which became a bestseller.

On 22 May 2021, she was invited as a speaker at Palace of Moncloa where she delivered a strongly critical speech about the depopulation of rural Spain in front of Spanish Prime Minister Pedro Sánchez, which went viral.

Since September 2021, she has worked as a columnist for El País. In September 2023, she published a children's book titled ¿Y si fuera feria cada día?, illustrated by Coco Dávez.

She has been a critic of liberalism and progressivism, describing them as a part of "forward flight", and has opposed Spain's relationship with the European Union.

== Works ==
- Feria (2020)
- ¿Y si fuera feria cada día? (2023), illustrated by Coco Dávez
