= Council of the Hispanidad =

- Consejo de la Hispanidad
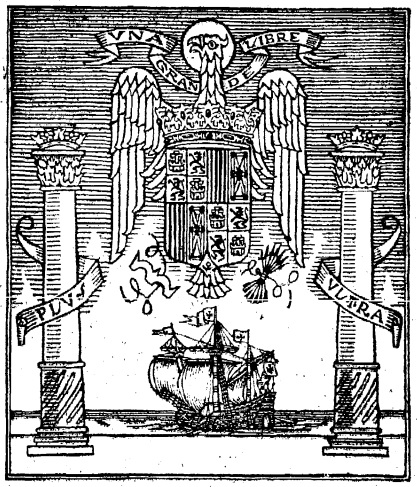

Agency overview
- Formed: November 1940
- Dissolved: December 1945
- Superseding agency: Institute of Hispanic Culture
- Jurisdiction: Spain
- Agency executive: Manuel Halcón (1941–1943), (Chancellor)

The Council of the Hispanidad (Spanish: Consejo de la Hispanidad) was a public body of the Francoist dictatorship dependent of the Spanish Ministry of Foreign Affairs. Created in 1940, it aimed towards the realization of the idea of "Hispanidad". It lasted until 1945, when it was replaced by the Institute of Hispanic Culture (ICH).

== History ==
A law dated 2 November 1940, published in the Boletín Oficial del Estado on 7 November, gave birth to the organ. The text, that put Spain as the "spiritual axis of the hispanic world, with title of preeminency in regards to the universal concerns", made a passing mention in the articles to the possibility, unattainable in the short term, of some kind of political union (Art. #2), a feature characteristic of the falangist ideology. Two months later, the composition of the Council was decided and, in April 1941, the bylaw of the organization was passed. These later regulations also attenuated the imperialist whims present at the Law. The membership included public officials, military personnel, falangist leaders, religious figures and right-wing intellectuals, amounting for 74 councillors. (Note: The correspondent order in the Boletín Oficial del Estado established as default members the officiales holding the following offices: minister of Foreign Affairs, Director of the Archivo de Indias, the National Felegate of the Exterior Service of de F.E.T. y de las J.O.N.S (then Felipe Ximénez de Sandoval, double appointment), the Subsecretary of Foreign Affairs (then Juan Peche y Cabeza de Vaca), the Chief of the Section of Cultural Relations of the Ministry of Foreign Affairs (then the marquis of Auñón), the Subsecretary of Press and Propaganda (then Antonio Tovar, double appointment), Subsecretary of Commerce, Secretary-General of the Ministry of the Navy, the Director General of Maritime Communications, the National Delegate of the Feminine Section of Falange Española Tradicionalista y de las JONS (then Pilar Primo de Rivera, double appointment), the National Delegate of the Frente de las Juventudes (then Sancho Dávila y Fernández de Celis), the President of the Institute of Political Studies (then Alfonso García Valdecasas), the National Delegate of Press and Propaganda of FET y de las JONS (then Ramón Serrano Suñer), the Spanish ambassadors to Argentina, Cuba, Chile, Mexico and Peru, the consul general in the Philippines (then José Castaño), the Prior of the Convent of Dominicans of San Esteban in Salamanca, and the Prior of the Convent of La Rábida. It explicitly appoints Manuel Halcón, Silvestre Sancho, Rafael Benjumea y Burín, Manuel García Morente, Luciano Serrano, Fernando Castiella, Santiago Magariños, Eugenio Montes, Antonio Tovar, Raimundo Fernández Cuesta, Pedro Laín Entralgo, Pilar Primo de Rivera, Cristóbal Colón y Carvajal, Felipe Ximénez de Sandoval, Manuel de Falla, Ramón Menéndez Pidal, Antonio Goicoechea, Leopoldo Eijo Garay, Sabas de Sarasola, Ignacio Zuloaga, Eduardo Marquina, Wenceslao Fernández Flórez, Jesús Pabón, Eugenio Vegas Latapié, José María Areilza, José Ortega y Gasset, Miguel Primo de Rivera, José Moscardó Ituarte, Carlos Martínez de Campos y Serrano, Eduardo Fuentes Cervera, Eduardo Gallarza, Eduardo Aunós, Julián Pemartín, Dionisio Ridruejo, Alfonso de Hoyos, José Millán Astray, José Miguel Guitarte, Justo Pérez de Urbel, Manuel Aznar, Víctor de la Serna, Juan Pujol, José Losada de la Torre, Melchor Fernández Almagro, Antonio Luna García, Fernando Valls Taberner, Federico García Sanchiz, José Rújula, Juan Claudio Güell, José Ibarra y Lasso de la Vega, Mariano Barber, José Fernández Rodríguez, Adolfo Prieto y Álvarez de las Vallinas and Baltasar Márquez.)

Until the creation of the Council of the Hispanidad, the issues related to Hispanic America were under the control of the Falange Exterior, organ of FET y de las JONS charged with the action of the party abroad. Later, the Service of the Falange Exterior maintained a pre-eminent role in the propaganda in Hispanic America.

Manuel Halcón was the Chancellor of the Council until his dismissal in July 1943. The vacant was not covered. His chancellery (a sort of executive board) was formed since April 1941 by Halcón, along Manuel Aznar, Fernando Castiella, Jesús Pabón, Antonio Tovar, Felipe Ximénez de Sandoval and Santiago Magariños. The entity, in a progressive decline since the fall from grace of Ramón Serrano Suñer, was subject to a re-purposing proposal at the end of 1942, in order to overcome the criticism coming from the US, that labelled the council as pro-Fascist and anti-American. Its functions were replaced in December 1945, after the end of the World War II, by the newly created Institute of Hispanic Culture.

== Bibliography ==
- Barbeito Díez, Mercedes (1989). "El Consejo de la Hispanidad". Espacio, tiempo y forma. Serie V, Historia contemporánea (2). Madrid: Universidad Nacional de Educación a Distancia: 113–137. ISSN 1130-0124.
- Arenal, Celestino del (1994). Política exterior de España hacia Iberoamérica. Madrid: Editorial Complutense.
- Delgado Gómez-Escalonilla, Lorenzo (1988). Diplomacia franquista y política cultural hacia Iberoamérica, 1939-1953. Madrid: Consejo Superior de Investigaciones Científicas, Centro de Estudios Históricos. ISBN 84-00-06892-0.
- Delgado Gómez-Escalonilla, Lorenzo (1992). Imperio de papel: acción cultural y política exterior durante el primer franquismo. Madrid: Consejo Superior de Investigaciones Científicas. ISBN 84-00-07243-X.
- Delgado Gómez-Escalonilla, Lorenzo (1994). "Las relaciones culturales de España en tiempo de crisis: de la II República a la Guerra Mundial". Espacio, tiempo y forma. Serie V, Historia contemporánea (2). Madrid: Universidad Nacional de Educación a Distancia: 259–294. ISSN 1130-0124.
- Gondi, Ovidio (1979). La Hispanidad franquista al servicio de Hitler. México D.F.: Ed. Diógenes.
- Payne, Stanley G. (1987). The Franco Regime, 1936–1975. Madison: The University of Wisconsin Press. ISBN 0-299-11070-2.
