= Antonio Blanco Freijeiro =

Spanish archaeologist and historian

Antonio Blanco Freijeiro (6 September 1923 in Marín, Pontevedra – 6 January 1991 in Las Rozas, Madrid) was a Spanish archaeologist and historian. He was professor of archaeology, Epigraphy and Numismatics at the University of Seville (1959–1973), of Classical Archeology at the Complutense University of Madrid (1973–1988), and member of the Royal Academy of History from 1976 until his death.
