= Carmen Iglesias =

Spanish historian

The Most Excellent Carmen Iglesias Countess of Gisbert
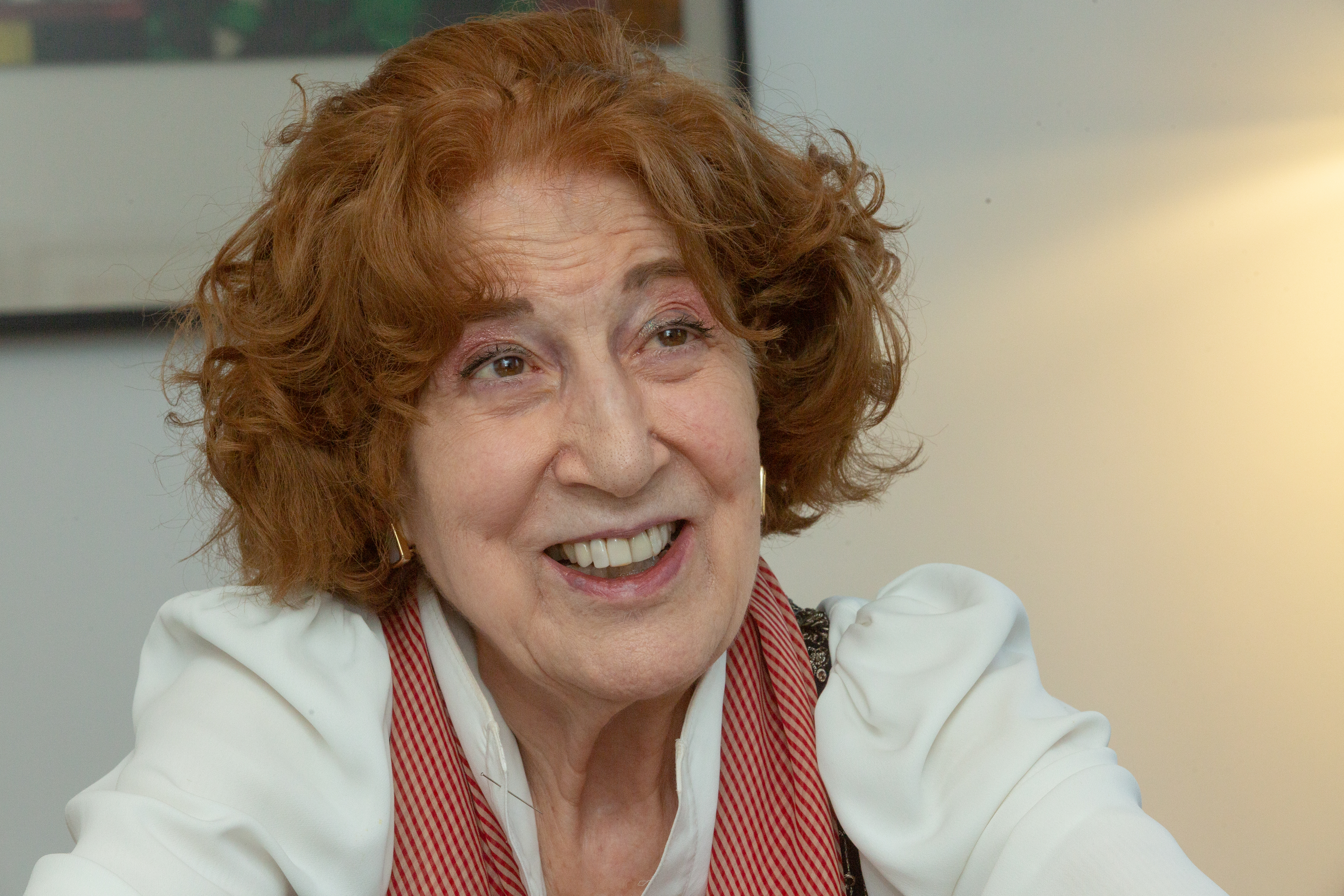
- Born: María del Carmen Iglesias Cano; 16 March 1942 (age 84); Madrid, Spain

Seat E of the Real Academia Española
- Incumbent
- Assumed office 30 September 2002 (Note: Elected on 13 April 2000)
- Preceded by: Gonzalo Torrente Ballester

María del Carmen Iglesias Cano, 1st Countess of Gisbert, is a Spanish historian. She is the Director of the Real Academia de la Historia. In this role she has been responsible for the launch of the electronic version of Spain's dictionary of national biography, the Diccionario biográfico español. She is also a member of the Royal Spanish Academy, which regulates the Spanish language.

She holds the non-hereditary title Countess of Gisbert, which was bestowed on her by King Juan Carlos.

== Biography ==
=== Education ===
Iglesias studied at the Complutense University of Madrid.

=== Career ===
Iglesias is a specialist in 18th-century history, and her publications include work on the French philosopher Montesquieu.

Iglesias was elected to medalla nº 23 of the Real Academia de la Historia on 16 June 1989 and took up her seat on 4 November 1991. She has been director of the Academy since 2014, and is the first female director of that institution. She was elected to Seat E of the Real Academia Española on 13 April 2000, she took up her seat on 30 September 2002.

=== Royal House ===
Iglesias has been a close friend of the Spanish royal family since the 1980s. In 1984, a year after obtaining the professorship at the Universidad Complutense de Madrid, she was appointed tutor to the Infanta Cristina in the Faculty of Political Science and Sociology. Later, between the late 1980s and 1993, she was the private teacher of Felipe, Prince of Asturias.

== Bibliography ==
El pensamiento de Montesquieu: política y ciencia natural. 1984, republished 2005. (link to lecture on Montesquieu)
