= Mandayona =

Mandayona, Spain
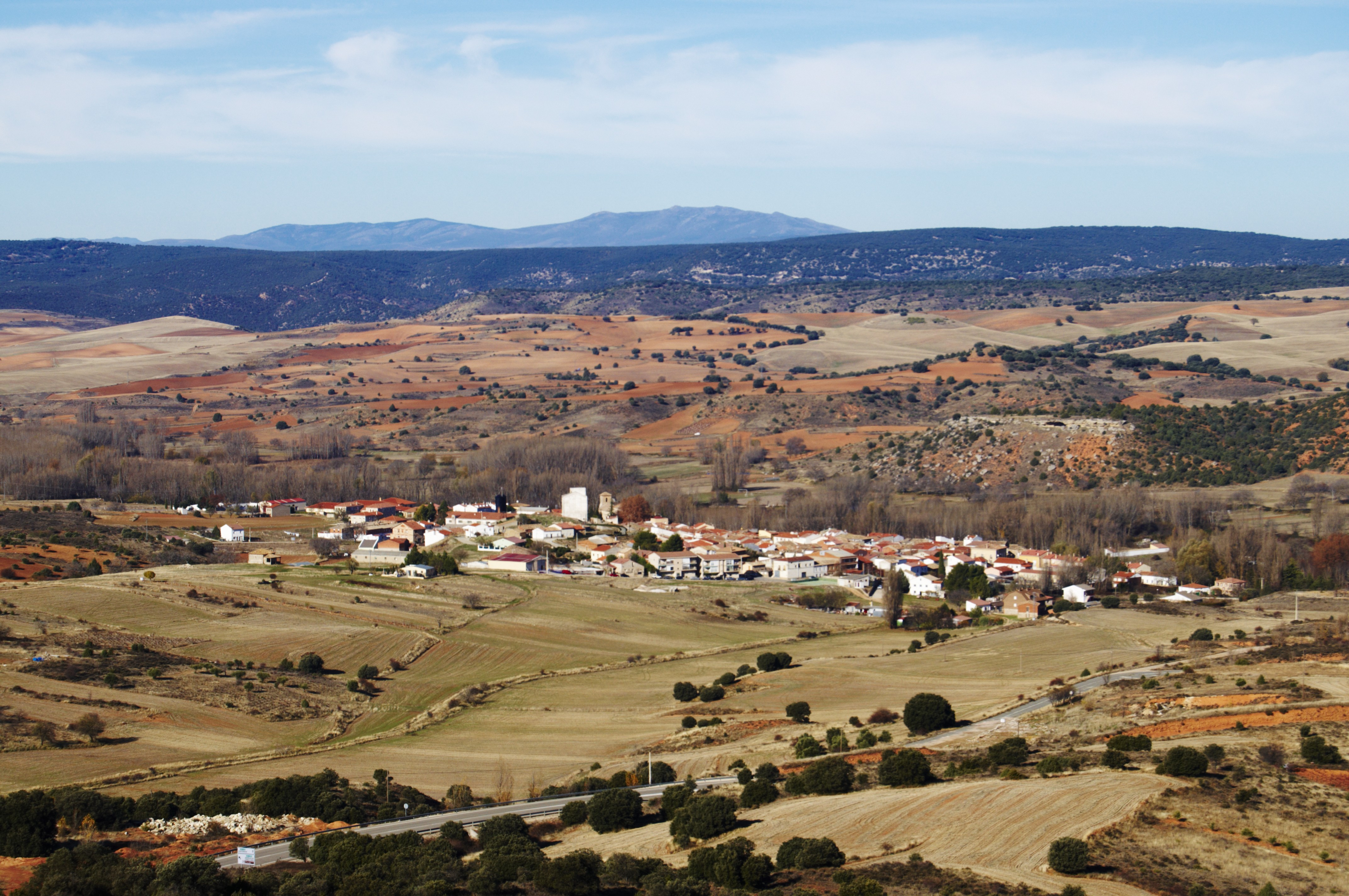

- Coat of arms

- Location within Province of Guadalajara Location within Castilla-La Mancha Location within Spain
- Coordinates: 40°57′27″N 2°44′54″W
- Country: Spain
- Autonomous community: Castile-La Mancha
- Province: Guadalajara
- Municipality: Mandayona

Area
  - Total: 33 km^{2} (13 sq mi)

Population (2025-01-01)
  - Total: 285
  - Density: 8.6/km^{2} (22/sq mi)
- Time zone: UTC+1 (CET)
  - Summer (DST): UTC+2 (CEST)

Mandayona is a municipality located in the province of Guadalajara, Castile-La Mancha, Spain. According to the 2004 census (INE), the municipality has a population of 405 inhabitants.
