= Royal Academy of History =

Spanish institution that studies history

- Real Academia de la Historia
- Arms of the Royal Academy of History
- Abbreviation: RAH
- Formation: 18 April 1738; 288 years ago
- Founder: Felipe V
- Headquarters: Madrid, Spain
- Coordinates: 40°24′48″N 3°41′56″W
- Region served: Spain
- Official language: Spanish
- Protector: Felipe VI (as King of Spain)
- Director: Carmen Iglesias
- Main organ: Governing Board
- Parent organization: Institute of Spain
- Affiliations: Union Académique Internationale
- Website: www.rah.es

The Royal Academy of History (Spanish: Real Academia de la Historia, RAH) is a Spanish institution in Madrid that studies history "ancient and modern, political, civil, ecclesiastical, military, scientific, of letters and arts, that is to say, the different branches of life, of civilisation, and of the culture of the Spanish people". Spanish people in this regard are understood to be citizens of the Kingdom of Spain or the indigenous people of its predecessors, or their descendants. The academy was established by royal decree of Philip V of Spain on 18 April 1738. Its official publication is the Boletín de la Real Academia de la Historia.

== Building ==
Since 1836 the academy has occupied an 18th-century building designed by the neoclassical architect Juan de Villanueva. The building was originally occupied by the Hieronymites, a religious order. It became available as a result of legislation in the 1830s confiscating monastic properties (the ecclesiastical confiscations of Mendizábal).

== Collections ==
As formerly the main Spanish institution for antiquaries, the academy retains significant libraries and collections of antiquities, which cannot be seen by the public. The keeper of antiquities is the prehistorian Martín Almagro Gorbea.

Items held include:

- The Glosas Emilianenses
- The Códice de Roda
- The San Millán Beatus
- The Missorium of Theodosius I, a large ceremonial silver dish, probably made in Constantinople for the tenth anniversary (decennalia) in 388 of the reign of the emperor Theodosius I, the last emperor to rule both the Eastern and Western Empires. It is one of the best surviving examples of Late Antique Imperial imagery and one of finest examples of late Roman goldsmith work.

== Ibero-America ==
The Academy is in constant communication with similar corporations in Ibero-America.

- Academia Nacional de la Historia de Venezuela (1888)
- Academia Colombiana de Historia (1902)
- Academia Mexicana de la Historia (1919)
- Academia Nacional de la Historia del Perú (1920)
- Academia Salvadoreña de la Historia (1922)
- Academia de Geografía e Historia de Guatemala (1923)
- Academia Nacional de la Historia de Ecuador (1928)
- Academia Nacional de la Historia de la República Argentina (1929)
- Academia Panameña de la Historia (1931)
- Academia Chilena de la Historia (1933)
- Academia Paraguaya de la Historia (1937)
- Instituto Histórico y Geográfico del Uruguay (1949)
- Academia Boliviana de la Historia (1959)
- Academia Puertorriqueña de la Historia (1960)
- Academia Dominicana de la Historia (1984)
- Instituto Histórico e Geográfico Brasileiro (1996)
- Academia de Geografía e Historia de Costa Rica (2006)

== Criticism ==
Some Spanish historians have considered it an obsolete misogynist institution, that still considers history as a matter of kings and battles. However, the image has changed since Carmen Iglesias, the first female director, took over in 2014 from Gonzalo Anes. (Note: Anes was initially replaced by Faustino Menéndez Pidal de Navascués.) By some authors RAH is considered a "thoroughly undemocratic" institution "unrepresentative of Spanish historical profession" and a hotbed of historical revisionism.

== Biographical work ==
=== Biographical dictionary ===
In 2011 the Academy published the first 20 volumes of a dictionary of national biography, the Diccionario Biográfico Español, to which some five thousand historians contributed. The publicly funded publication has been subject of controversy for failing to achieve the standards of objectivity associated with, for example, the Oxford Dictionary of National Biography. The British Dictionary restricted itself to persons who were deceased, and the historian Henry Kamen has argued that it was a mistake for its Spanish equivalent to include living figures among entries. However, while there was criticism of entries for some living people (such as the politician Esperanza Aguirre), the main allegations of bias concern articles relating to Francoist Spain. A notable example was the entry on Francisco Franco, written by Luis Suárez Fernández, in which Franco is defined as an autocratic head of state rather than a dictator. In contrast, the dictionary reportedly defames individuals such as Juan Negrín, the last prime minister of the Second Republic.

The dictionary sparked an outcry. Most objections came from voices on the left such as the party United Left and the newspaper Público. For his part, Green party senator Joan Saura asked for publication of the dictionary to be stopped and the offending volumes withdrawn. There was also a call for corrections from the Ministry of Education. The academy announced in June 2011 that amendments would be made to the text online and in future paper editions. In 2012, when the Minister of Education, Culture and Sport, made a statement on the subject of the dictionary, it was still not clear whether the academy was willing to describe Franco as a dictator. Carmen Iglesias, director of the academy, vowed to modify the online version in 2015. In 2018 a ceremony was held at El Pardo to launch the online edition, Diccionario Biografico Electronico. Franco's status as a dictator was confirmed.

=== Metro collaboration ===
In 2015 the academy entered into an initiative in collaboration with Metro de Madrid to provide information about people who have given their names to metro stations. Stations named after people include Concha Espina and Paco de Lucia. Display panels have been placed in the stations in question.

== Monuments and memorials removed during the George Floyd protests ==
In 2020 the academy issued a statement "deploring" recent attacks on statues of figures from Spanish history, such as Christopher Columbus, which had taken place as part of the George Floyd protests. It reaffirmed its "commitment to the knowledge of Spain's actions in America, beyond the falsification, the distortion and the partisan manipulation."

== Numerary members ==
Per article 6 of its statutes, the Real Academia de la Historia is composed of a maximum of 36 "numbered academics" who must be Spanish citizens. There are also academics of honour and academic correspondents, who may be of any nationality. The director since 2014 has been Carmen Iglesias.

The Numbered Academics are (after the number of chair):

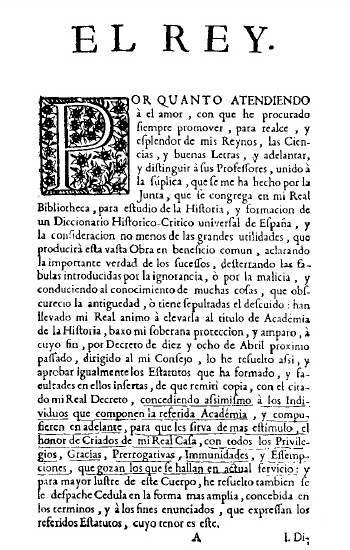
Royal approval of the first statute of the Real Academia de la Historia 17 June 1738

1. Vicente Pérez Moreda
2. Hugo O'Donnell y Duque de Estrada
3. Vacant
4. Vacant
5. Feliciano Barrios Pintado
6. José Manuel Nieto
7. Josefina Gómez Mendoza
8. José Remesal Rodríguez
9. María del Pilar León-Castro Alonso
10. Octavio Ruiz-Manjón
11. Martín Almagro Gorbea
12. Elena E. Rodríguez Díaz
13. Jaime Salazar y Acha
14. Francisco Javier Puerto Sarmiento
15. Juan Pablo Fusi Aizpurúa
16. Antonio Cañizares Llovera
17. Amparo Alba Cecilia
18. José Antonio Escudero López
19. Luis Antonio Ribot García
20. Vacant
21. José Ángel Sesma Muñoz
22. Enriqueta Vila Vilar
23. María del Carmen Iglesias Cano
24. Fernando Marías Franco
25. Miguel Ángel Ladero Quesada
26. Serafín Fanjul García
27. Miguel Ángel Ochoa Brun
28. Luis Alberto de Cuenca y Prado
29. José Luis Díez García
30. Carmen Sanz Ayán
31. Enrique Moradiellos García
32. Carlos Martínez Shaw
33. María Jesús Viguera Molins
34. Juan Francisco Fuentes Aragonés
35. Xavier Gil Puyol
36. Luis Agustín García Moreno
