= Lillian Estelle Fisher =

20th-century American historian and author

- Born: May 1, 1891; Selinsgrove, Pennsylvania
- Died: May 4, 1988 (aged 97); Moraga, California

Lillian Estelle Fisher (May 1, 1891 – May 4, 1988) was one of the first women to earn a doctorate in Latin American history in the U.S. She published important works on Spanish colonial administration; a biography of Manuel Abad y Queipo, reform bishop-elect of Michoacan; and a monograph on the Tupac Amaru rebellion in Peru. As distinguished colonial Latin American historian John J. TePaske put it in 1968, "At least three generations of graduate students have studied the works of Lillian Estelle Fisher." Fisher is included as an example of sexual/gender discrimination in the historical profession.

== Early life ==
Fisher was born in Pennsylvania to farmers George P. Fisher and Etta R. Fisher in 1891. She attended Susquehanna University for her B.A., earning highest honors in 1912. She briefly taught at a Methodist normal school (teacher-education training school) in Puebla, Mexico (1913–1916). Fisher moved to California and earned her M.A. at the University of Southern California in 1918, then attended the University of California, Berkeley for her doctorate, which she completed in 1924 under Herbert I. Priestley. She remained for a time in California, teaching at Whittier College. She taught for 15 years at the Oklahoma College for Women (1926–1942), and returned to Berkeley, where she taught for a time at the extension of the University of California. As Fisher was one a very small number of women earning doctorates in history, her mentor was concerned that as a woman she would face discrimination in the field; however, Priestley did not support the entrance of women in major history departments.

== Academic career ==
In keeping with the intellectual trends in Latin American history at the time, Fisher pursued institutional history, with one work on the viceregal administration and the other on the eighteenth-century Bourbon reforms establishing the intendancy system. In 1955, she published the first full-length biography of reform bishop-elect of Michoacan, Manuel Abad y Queipo. This remains the main work on this important figure of the late colonial period in Mexico. She also wrote a monograph on the background to Mexican independence, and her research on Masons in that era continues to be cited. She also wrote an important early article on women in the Mexican Revolution, "The Influence of the Present Mexican Revolution on the Status of Women", which has been included in an anthology on women in Latin American history. Her final monograph on the Tupac Amaru revolt was published in 1966, when she was 75.

Fisher served as the Secretary of the Conference on Latin American History in 1938, when major organizational decisions were taken.

Fisher donated her papers, unpublished novels, and personal correspondence to the Bancroft Library, University of California, Berkeley. Materials relating to Mexico have been separated from her personal papers.

== Death ==
Fisher died in Moraga, California, in May 1988, at age 97.

== Works ==
- Viceregal Administration in the Spanish Colonies. Berkeley: University of California Press 1926.
- The Intendant System in Spanish America. Berkeley: University of California Press 1929.
- The Background of the Movement for Mexican Independence. New York: Russell and Russell 1934.
- Champion of Reform: Manuel Abad y Queipo. New York: Library Publishers 1955.
- The Last Inca Revolt, 1780–1783. Norman: University of Oklahoma Press 1966.

=== Articles ===
- "The Intendant System in Spanish America," The Hispanic American Historical Review (HAHR), vol. 8 No. 1 (Feb. 1928), pp. 3–13.
- "Teodoro de Croix," HAHR Vol. 9, No. 4 (November 1929), pp. 488–504.
- "Manuel Abad y Queipo, Bishop of Michoacan," HAHR vol. 15, No. 4 (November 1935), pp. 425–447.
- "The Influence of the Present Mexican Revolution on the Status of Women," HAHR Vol. 22, No. 1 (Feb., 1942), pp. 211–228

== See also ==
- Conference on Latin American History
- Historiography of Colonial Spanish America
