= Historiography of Colonial Spanish America =

Area of study on 15th–19th century territory

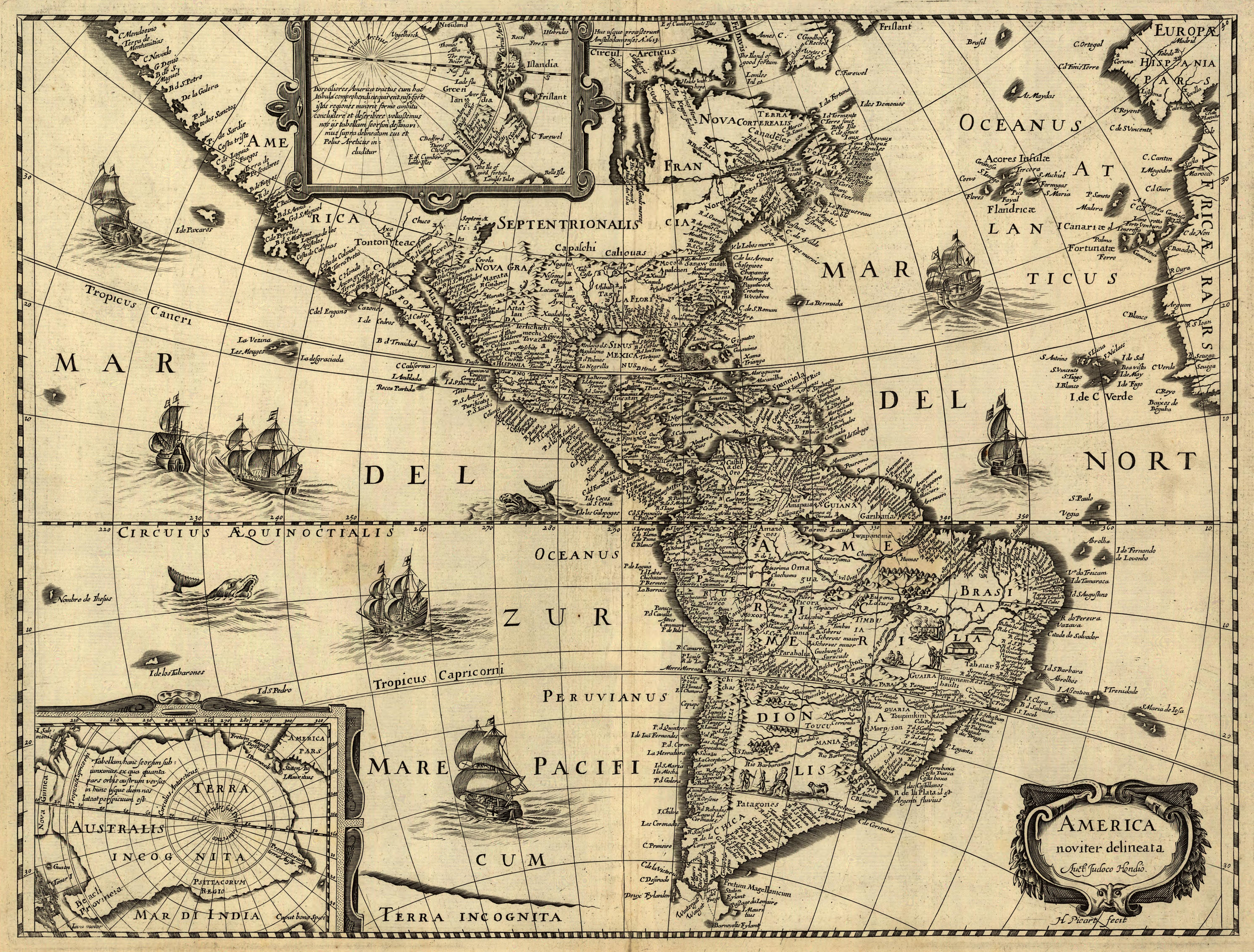
A 17th–century Dutch map of the Americas

The historiography of Spanish America in multiple languages is vast and has a long history. It dates back to the early sixteenth century with multiple competing accounts of the conquest, Spaniards’ eighteenth-century attempts to discover how to reverse the decline of its empire, and people of Spanish descent born in the Americas (criollos) search for an identity other than Spanish, and the creation of creole patriotism. Following independence in some parts of Spanish America, some politically engaged citizens of the new sovereign nations sought to shape national identity. In the nineteenth and early twentieth centuries, non-Spanish American historians began writing chronicles important events, such as the conquests of the Aztec Empire and the Inca Empire, dispassionate histories of the Spanish imperial project after its almost complete demise in the hemisphere, and histories of the southwest borderlands, areas of the United States that had previously been part of the Spanish Empire, led by Herbert Eugene Bolton. At the turn of the twentieth century, scholarly research on Spanish America saw the creation of college courses dealing with the region, the systematic training of professional historians in the field, and the founding of the first specialized journal, Hispanic American Historical Review. For most of the twentieth century, historians of colonial Spanish America read and were familiar with a large canon of work. With the expansion of the field in the late twentieth century, there has been the establishment of new subfields, the founding of new journals, and the proliferation of monographs, anthologies, and articles for increasingly specialized practitioners and readerships. The Conference on Latin American History, the organization of Latin American historians affiliated with the American Historical Association, awards a number of prizes for publications, with works on early Latin American history well represented. The Latin American Studies Association has a section devoted to scholarship on the colonial era.

== General works ==
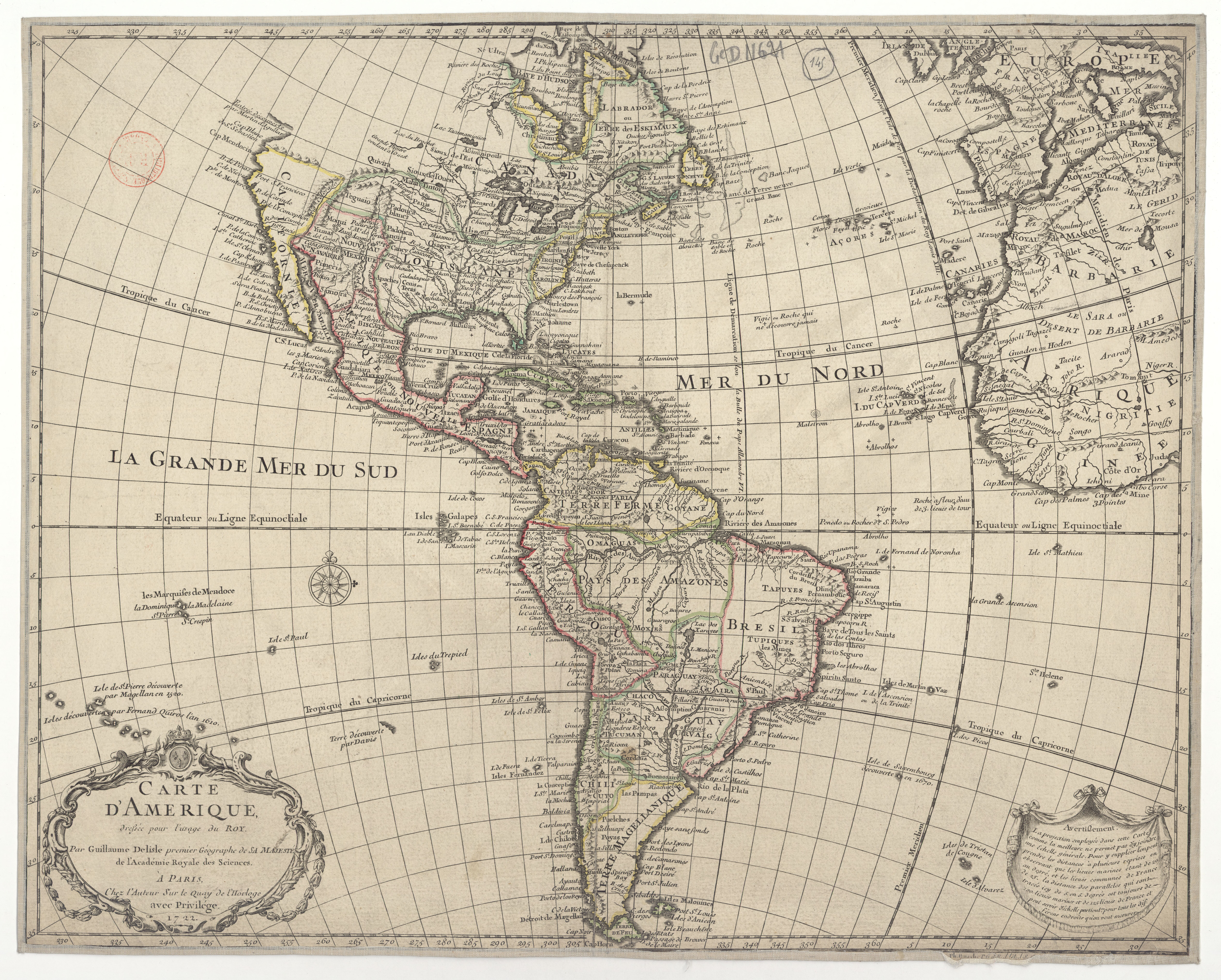
"Carte d'Amérique" by French cartographer Guillaume Delisle 1774

Spanish America, showing modern boundaries with the U.S.

Although the term "colonial" is contested by some scholars as being historically inaccurate, pejorative, or both, it remains a standard term for the titles of books, articles, and scholarly journals and the like to denote the period 1492 – ca. 1825.

The first two volumes of the ten-volume Cambridge History of Latin America focus on the colonial era, with the following eight volumes concerned with the independence era to circa 1980. The purpose of the project was "to produce a high-level synthesis of existing knowledge which will provide historians of Latin America with a solid basis for future research, which students of Latin America will find useful and which will be of interest to historians of other areas of the world" (vol. 1, p. xiv). Volume One deals with the prehispanic era, conquest and settlement, and the establishment of government and commerce. Volume Two focuses on economic and social history, with chapters on Blacks, Indians, and women, groups that were generally excluded from scholarly attention until the late twentieth century. Some colonial historians reviewing the first two volumes criticized the overall structure of the series and the colonial-focused volumes themselves. These concern the “presentist,” structure of the project, seeing the colonial era as a prelude to the modern era rather than giving full weight to the three hundred years of rule by the Spanish Empire and Portuguese Empire; cursory treatment of the linkages between Europe and the Americas; the lack of linkages between the articles; and lack of comparison between Spanish America and Brazil. The emphasis on social and economic history and the general lack of discussion of the institutions of the Catholic Church and the State may be a reflection of academic interests of the contributors and the era of the 1960s and 1970s when many contributors were trained. The almost complete absence of contributions by Latin American or Spanish scholars comes in for criticism, with one reviewer considering that issue “the fundamental flaw of this entire production to date.”

A number of general works used as textbooks have focused on the colonial era for both Spanish America and Brazil, providing an overview of the field. A major synthesis comparing Spanish America and Brazil, by two contributors to the Cambridge History of Latin America, is James Lockhart's and Stuart B. Schwartz's 1983 Early Latin America. They argue that Spanish America and Brazil were structurally similar and "that political and cultural differences between Spanish and Portuguese America were less significant than the economic and social differences between central and peripheral regions." This idea was proposed in Stanley J. Stein and Barbara H. Stein's The Colonial Heritage of Latin America (1970), but which Lockhart and Schwartz work out in more detail, examining both internal as well as external linkages. Early Latin America is written as a textbook and although it has not undergone multiple editions for a mass market, it remains an important and affordable work synthesizing considerable material found in the first two volumes of the Cambridge History of Latin America. A standard work on colonial Latin America that has gone through multiple editions is Mark Burkholder and Lyman L. Johnson's Colonial Latin America. Matthew Restall and Kris Lane have published Latin America in Colonial Times for the textbook market. Collections of primary source documents have been published over the years, which are especially valuable for classroom use.

There are relatively few general works on in English on a single country, but Mexico has been the subject of a number of histories. Two general works concentrating on the colonial period are by Ida Altman and coauthors. and Alan Knight.

Multi-volume reference works have appeared over the years. The Handbook of Latin American Studies, based in the Hispanic Division of the Library of Congress, annually publishes annotated bibliographies of new works in the field, with contributing editors providing an overview essay. The five-volume Encyclopedia of Latin American History and Culture appeared in 1996, with short articles by multiple authors. A general three-volume work published in 2006 is Iberia and the Americas. Various other more specialized encyclopedias have appeared, such as the two-volume Encyclopedia of Mexico: History, Society, and Culture. Anthropology and ethnohistory have multi-volume works devoted to Spanish America, including the six-volume Handbook of South American Indians (1946–1959) The National Science Foundation provided funding to create the Handbook of Middle American Indians (1964–1976). A three-volume work, Oxford Encyclopedia of Mesoamerican Cultures has articles on the sweep of Mesoamerican culture from pre-Contact to the late twentieth century. Another specialized work appearing in tandem with the 500th anniversary of Columbus's voyage is The Christopher Columbus Encyclopedia. 2 vols. Useful bibliographic tools for colonial Mexico are the three volumes by historical geographer Peter Gerhard dealing with civil administrative and ecclesiastical jurisdictions in central Mexico, the north, and the southeastern frontier.

Useful historiographical essays on colonial Spanish America include those in The Oxford Handbook of Latin American History. The historiographical essays deal with New Spain, colonial Spanish South America, sexuality, and the independence era. Many important essays by major figures in the field have appeared journals over the years. Eric Van Young has published a number of historiographical essays focusing on colonial Mexico.

Original scholarly research, bibliographic review essays, and reviews of individual works appear in an increasing number of scholarly journals, including Hispanic American Historical Review (1918–), The Americas, (1944–) Journal of Latin American Studies (1969–), Bulletin of Latin American Research (1981–), Colonial Latin American Review (1992–), Journal of Colonial Latin American Studies (2016–), and others. The digitization of journals and their availability online make it far easier for access. In recent years, the U.S. National Endowment for the Humanities has overseen the development of electronic listservs on a variety of topics. H-LATAM and others publish book reviews online, accessible to the public.

== Early historiography ==
From the early sixteenth century onward, Spaniards wrote accounts of Spain's overseas explorations, conquests, religious evangelization, the overseas empire. The authors range from conquerors, crown officials, and religious personnel. The early development of the idea of Spanish American local patriotism, separate from Spanish identity, has been examined through the writings of a number of key figures, such as Gonzalo Fernández de Oviedo y Valdés, Bartolomé de las Casas, Antonio de Herrera y Tordesillas, Fray Juan de Torquemada, Francisco Javier Clavijero, and others. Spaniards grappled with how to write their own imperial history and Spanish Americas created a "patriotic epistemology."

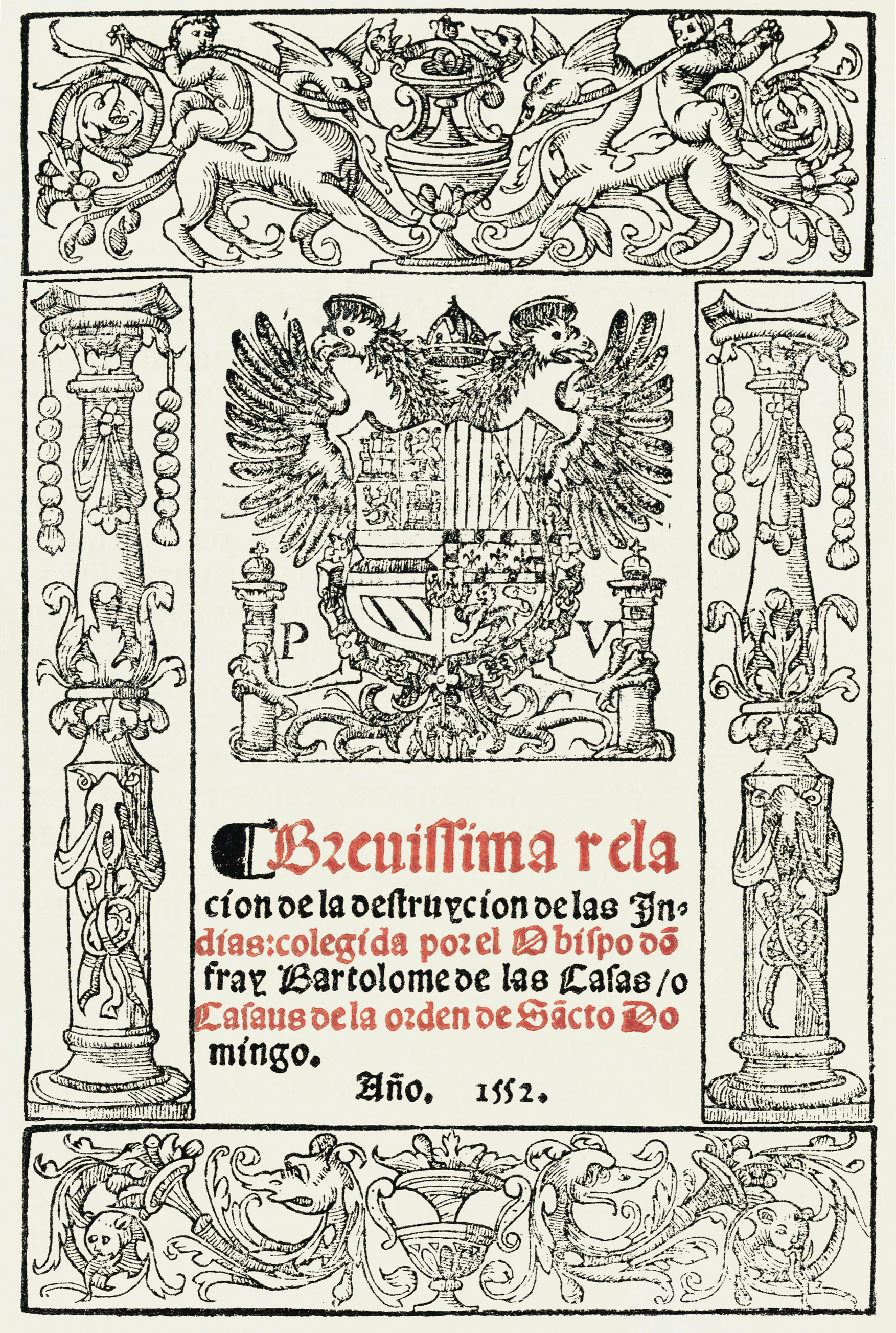
Cover of Bartolomé de las Casas, A Short Account of the Destruction of the Indies (1552), which provided grist for the Black Legend

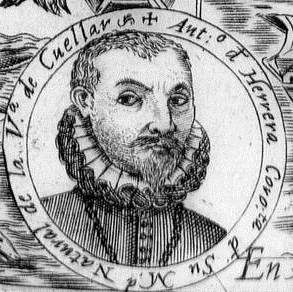
Antonio de Herrera y Tordesillas, early Spanish historian of Spain's overseas empire

European rivals of Spain wrote a number of polemics, characterizing the Spanish as cruel, bigoted, and exploitative. The so-called Black Legend drew on Bartolomé de Las Casas's contemporary critique, A Short Account of the Destruction of the Indies (1552) and became an entrenched view of the Spanish colonial era. Defenders of the Spanish attempts to defend the Indians from exploitation created what was called the White Legend of Spanish tolerance and protection of the Indians. The question was debated in the mid to late twentieth century and continues to have some salience in the twenty-first.

Scottish scholar William Robertson (1721–1793), who established his scholarly reputation by writing a biography of Spain's Charles V, wrote the first major history in English of Spanish America, The History of America (1777). The work paraphrases much of Spanish historian Antonio de Herrera y Tordesillas's Décadas, it also contained new sources. It reached a wide readership when Britain was rising as a global empire. Robertson drew on Las Casas's A Short Account, of Spanish cruelty, he noted Las Casas likely exaggerated. Spanish historians debated whether to translate Robertson's history to Spanish, which proponents supported because of Robertson's generally even-handed approach to Spanish history, but the project ultimately shelved when powerful politician José de Gálvez disapproved.

Scholars in France, particularly Comte de Buffon (1707–1788), Guillaume Thomas François Raynal (1713–1796) and Cornelius de Pauw (1739–1799), whose works generally disparaged the Americas and its populations the region, which Iberian-born Spaniards ("peninsulars") and Latin American-born Spaniards ("criollos") sought to counter.

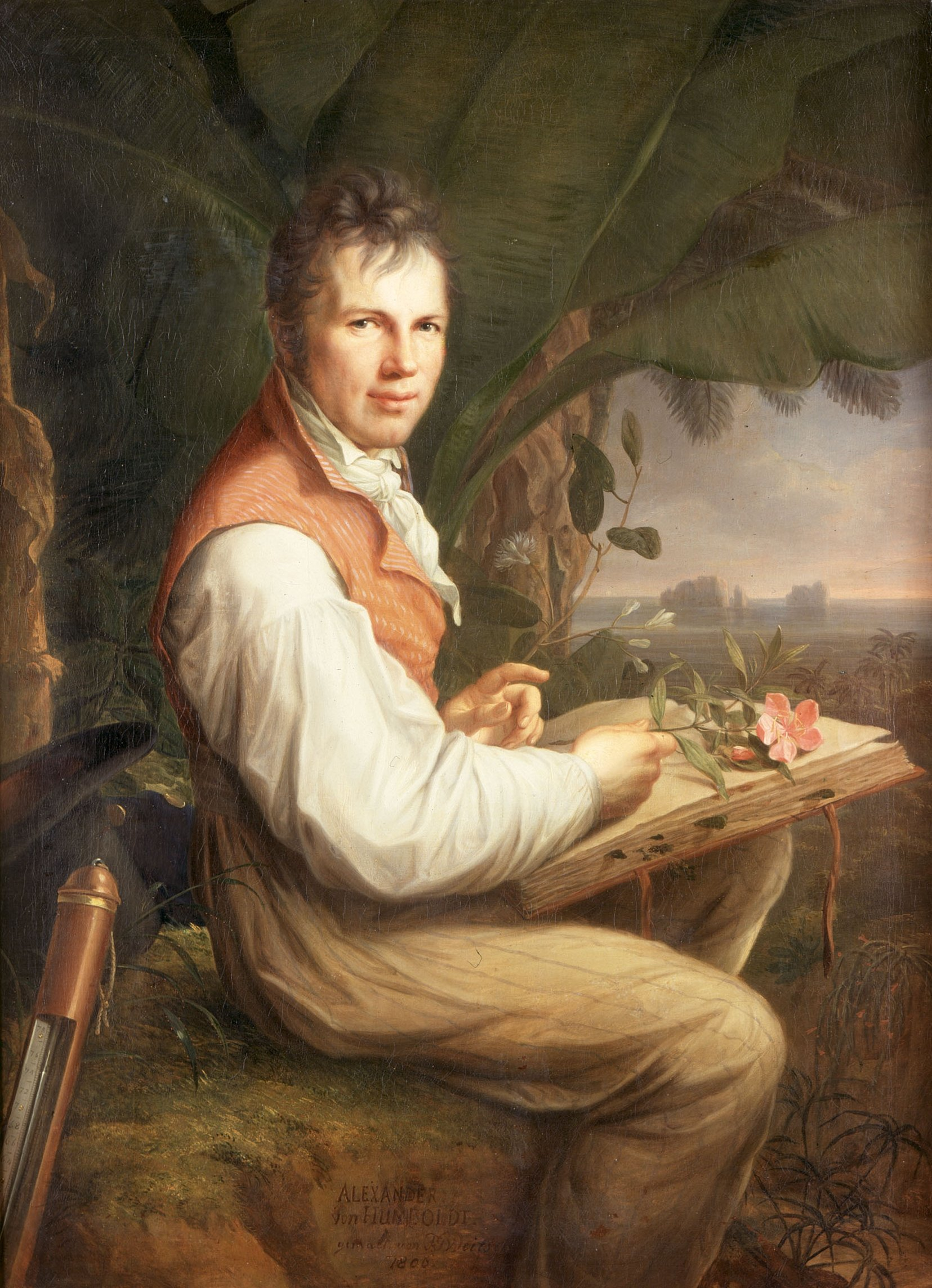
Portrait of Alexander von Humboldt painted shortly after his return from Spanish America by Friedrich Georg Weitsch, 1806

A major figure in Spanish American history and historiography is Prussian scientist and explorer Alexander von Humboldt. His five-year scientific sojourn in Spanish America with the approval of the Spanish crown, contributed new knowledge about the wealth and diversity of the Spanish empire. Humboldt's self-funded expedition from 1799 to 1840 was the foundation of his subsequent publications that made him the dominant intellectual figure of the nineteenth century. His Political Essay on the Kingdom of New Spain was first published in French in 1810 and was immediately translated to English. Humboldt's full access to crown officials and their documentary sources allowed him to create a detailed description of Spain's most valuable colony at the turn of the nineteenth century. "In all but his strictly scientific works, Humboldt acted as the spokesman of the Bourbon Enlightenment, the approved medium, so to say, through which the collective inquiries of an entire generation of royal officials and creole savants were transmitted to the European public, their reception assured by the prestige of the author."

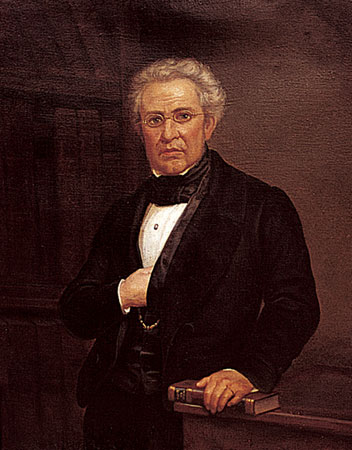
Lucas Alamán, conservative politician and the author of a 5 volume history of Mexico

In the early post-independence era, history writing in the nations of Spanish America was accomplished by those from a particular country or region. Often these writings are part of the creation of a national identity from a particular political viewpoint. Politically conservative historians looked to the colonial era with nostalgia, while politically liberal historians considered the colonial era with disdain. An important example is Mexico's conservative politician and intellectual Lucas Alamán. His five-volume Historia de Mejico is the country's first history, covering the colonial era up to and including the struggle for independence. Alamán viewed crown rule during the colonial era as ideal, and political independence that after the brief monarchy of Agustín de Iturbide, the Mexican republic was characterized by liberal demagoguery and factionalism. Writing in the mid-nineteenth century, Mexican liberal Vicente Riva Palacio, grandson of insurgent hero Vicente Guerrero, wrote a five-volume history of the colonial era from a liberal viewpoint, During the era of Porfirio Díaz (1876–1911), writing a new history of Mexico became a priority and Justo Sierra, minister of education, wrote an important work, The Political Evolution of the Mexican People (1900–02), whose first two major sections deal with "aboriginal civilizations and the conquest" and the colonial era and independence .

In the United States, the work of William Hickling Prescott (1796–1859) on the conquests of Mexico and Peru became best sellers in the mid-nineteenth century, but were firmly based on printed texts and archival sources. Prescott's work on the conquest of the Aztec Empire was almost immediately translated to Spanish for a Mexican readership, even though it had an underlying anti-Catholic bias. For conservative Mexicans, Prescott's description of the Aztecs as "barbarians" and "savages" fit their notion of the indigenous and the need for the Spanish conquest.

The United States victory in the Mexican–American War (1846–48), when it gained significant territory in western North America, incorporated territory previously held by Spain and then independent Mexico and in the United States the history of these now-called Spanish borderlands became a subject for historians. In the United States, Hubert Howe Bancroft was a leader in the development of the history of Spanish American history and the borderlands. His multivolume histories of various regions of northern Spanish America were foundational works in the field, although sometimes dismissed by later historians, "at their peril." He accumulated a vast research library, which he donated to University of California, Berkeley. The Bancroft Library was a key component to the emergence of the Berkeley campus as a center for the study Latin American history. A major practitioner of the field was Berkeley professor Herbert E. Bolton, who became director of the Bancroft Library. As President of the American Historical Association laid out his vision of an integrated history of the Americas in "The Epic of Greater America".

Starting around the turn of the twentieth century, university-level courses on Latin American history were created and the number of historians trained in the use of "scientific history," using primary sources and even-handed approach to the writing of history increased. Early leaders in the field founded the Hispanic American Historical Review in 1918, and then as the number of practitioners drew, they founded the professional organization of Latin American historians, the Conference on Latin American History in 1926. The development of Latin American history was first examined in a two-volume collection of essays and primary sources, prepared for the Conference on Latin American History, and in a monograph by Helen Delpar, Looking South: The Evolution of Latin Americanist Scholarship in the United States, 1850–1975. For more recent history of the field in Great Britain, see Victor Bulmer-Thomas, ed. Thirty Years of Latin American Studies in the United Kingdom 1965–1995.

== European Age of Exploration and the early Caribbean ==
Amerigo Vespucci awakens "America" in a Stradanus's engraving (circa 1638)

The European age of expansion or the age of exploration focuses on the period from the European point of view: crown sponsorship of voyages of exploration, early contacts with indigenous peoples, and the establishment of European settlements. There were a spate of publications that appeared in order to coincide with the 500th anniversary of Columbus's 1492 voyage. A number of important contributions published earlier include the two-volume First Images of America: The Impact of the New World on the Old. Hugh Honour's beautifully illustrated The New Golden Land: European Images of America from Discoveries to the Present Time includes many allegorical images of "America" as a befeathered, half-naked denizen of the "New World", which began appearing in Europe in the mid-sixteenth century.

Early European settlements in the Caribbean and the role of the family of Genoese mariner Christopher Columbus have been the subject of a number of studies. Historical geographer Carl O. Sauer's The Early Spain Main remains a classic publication. The 500th anniversary of Columbus's first voyage was marked with a large number of publications, a number of which emphasize the indigenous as historical actors, helping to create a fuller and more nuanced picture of historical dynamics in the Caribbean. Ida Altman's study of the rebellion of the indigenous leader Enriquillo includes a very useful discussion of the historiography of the early period. The importance of the early Caribbean to the Atlantic World and Colonial Spanish America is explored in a recent anthology by historians.

== Historiography of the conquest ==
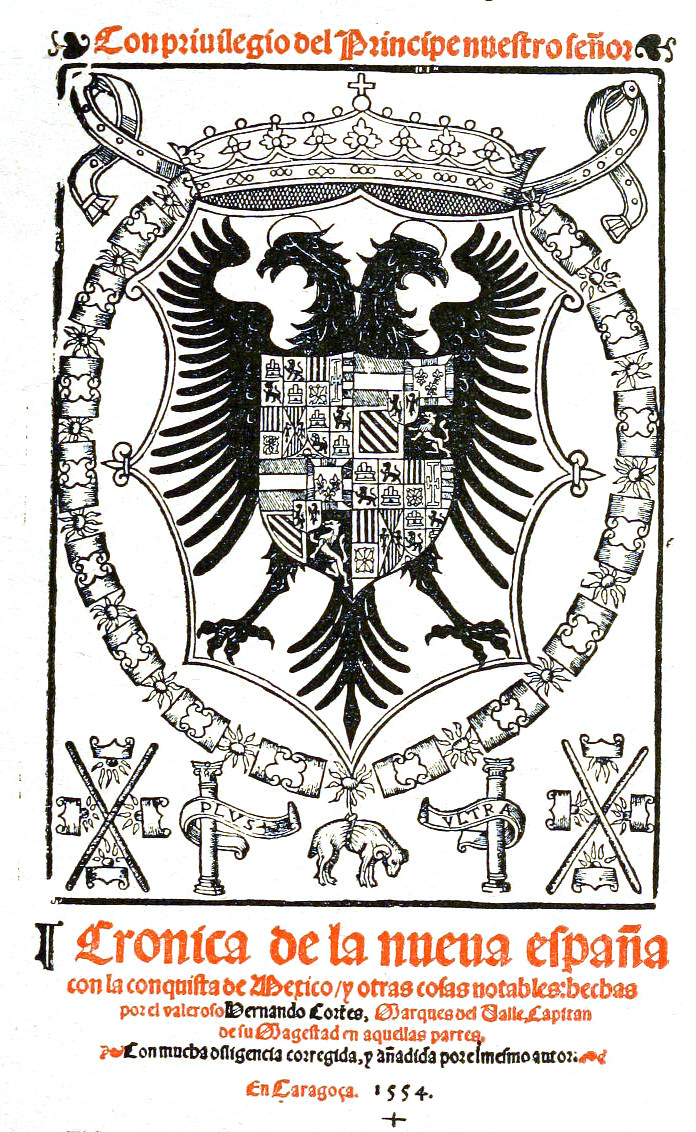
Francisco López de Gómara's account of the conquest of the Aztec Empire (1555). Conqueror Bernal Díaz del Castillo sought to set the record straight with his True History of the Conquest of New Spain

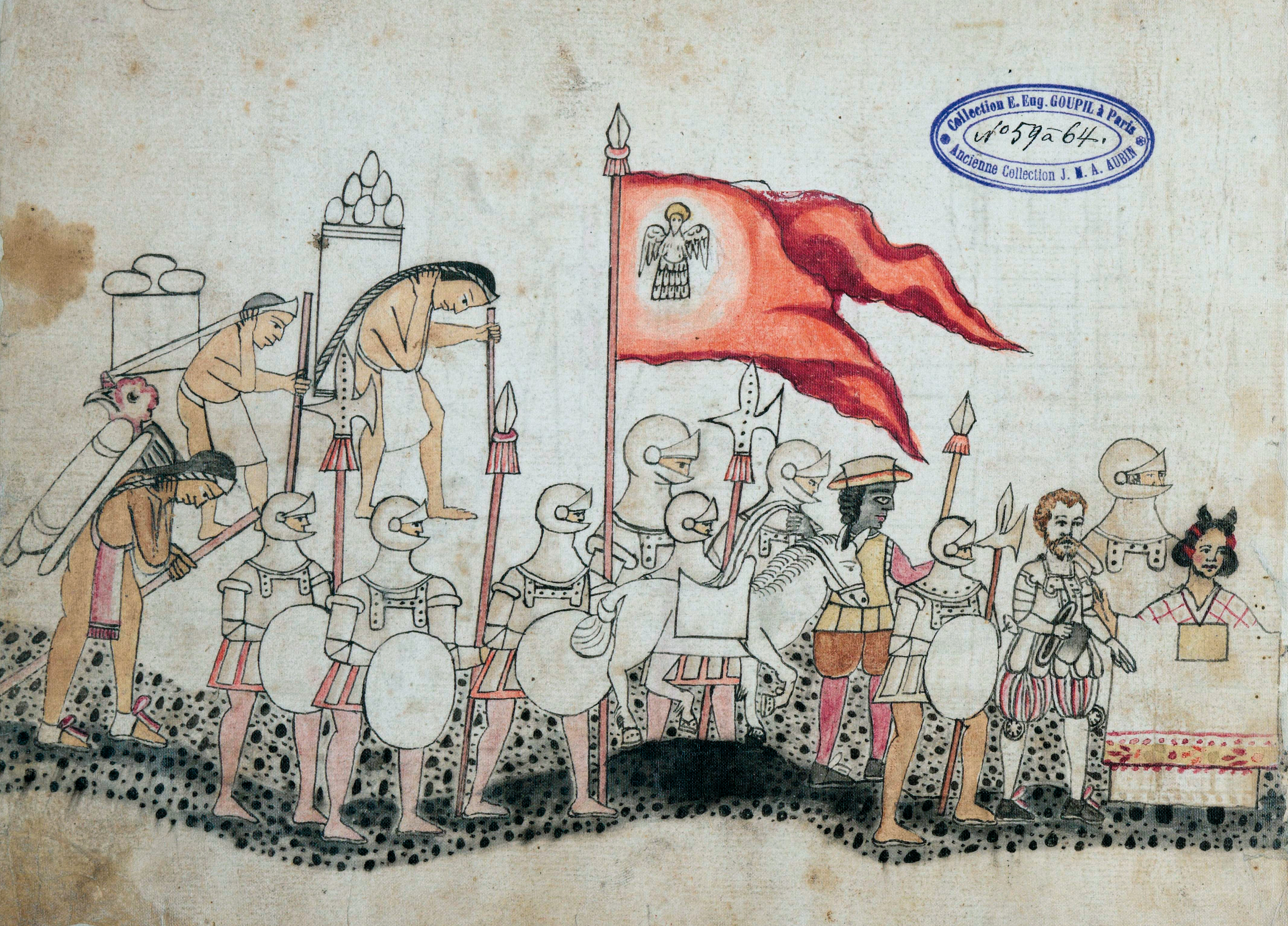
Codex Azcatitlan showing Cortés, Malinche, and a black slave

The history of the Spanish conquest of the Aztec Empire and of the conquest of the Inca Empire has long fascinated scholars and the general public. With the quincentenary of the first Columbus voyage in 1492, there has been a renewed interest in the very early encounter between Europeans and New World indigenous peoples. Sources for the histories of the conquest of the Aztec Empire are particularly rich, and the historiographical debates about events and interpretations from multiple viewpoints inform the discussions.

Spanish conqueror Hernán Cortés wrote to Charles V during the events of the conquest, attempting to his explain his actions and demonstrate the importance of the conquest. Bernal Díaz del Castillo wrote important accounts of the conquest, and other, less prominent Spanish conquerors petitioned the crown to garner rewards from the crown. In addition to these accounts by the European winners, are those by their indigenous allies, particularly the Tlaxcalans and Texcocans, but also the defeated rulers of Mexico-Tenochtitlan. A "vision of the vanquished" was recorded by sixteenth-century Franciscan, Bernardino de Sahagún as the last volume of his General History of the Things of New Spain, often known as the Florentine Codex.

Revisionist history of the conquest was being written as early as the sixteenth century. Accounts by Spanish participants and later authors have long been available, starting with the publication of Hernán Cortés's letters to the king, Francisco López de Gómara's biography of Cortés commissioned by Cortés's son and heir Don Martín. That laudatory biography prompted an irate Bernal Díaz del Castillo to write his "true history" of the conquest of New Spain, finished in 1568, but first published in 1632. Multiple editions of Cortés's letters and Bernal Díaz del Castillo's "true history" have appeared over the years. Accounts from the various Nahua perspectives have appeared, including Franciscan Bernardino de Sahagún's two accounts of the conquest from the Tlatelolco viewpoint, book XII of the Florentine Codex, Anthologies of accounts of the conquest from additional Nahua perspectives have appeared. Spanish accounts of the conquest of Yucatán have been available in print, but now accounts by Maya conquerors have been published in English translation. The so-called "new conquest history" aims to encompass any encounter between Europeans and indigenous peoples in contexts beyond complex indigenous civilizations and European conquerors.

A scholarly debate in the twentieth century concerned the so-called Black Legend, which characterized the Spanish conquest and its colonial empire as being uniquely cruel and Spaniards as fanatical and bigoted. It engaged historians in Spain, Argentina, and in the English-speaking scholarly world. In the United States, Lewis Hanke's studies of Dominican Bartolomé de Las Casas opened the debate, arguing that Spain struggled for justice in its treatment of the indigenous. Benjamin Keen took the position that the assessment of Spanish mistreatment was largely true. Charles Gibson edited a volume of writings on the Spanish Black Legend. Sverker Arnoldson (1960) and William B. Maltby (1971) showed that anti-Spanish attitudes in Europe antedated Las Casas's writings and had multiple origins. Generally the Spanish Black Legend is no longer a source of scholarly debate; however, anti-Spanish attitudes and stereotypes continue to affect modern debates about immigration in the United States and other issues, although the explicit label Black Legend is generally not invoked.

== Demography ==
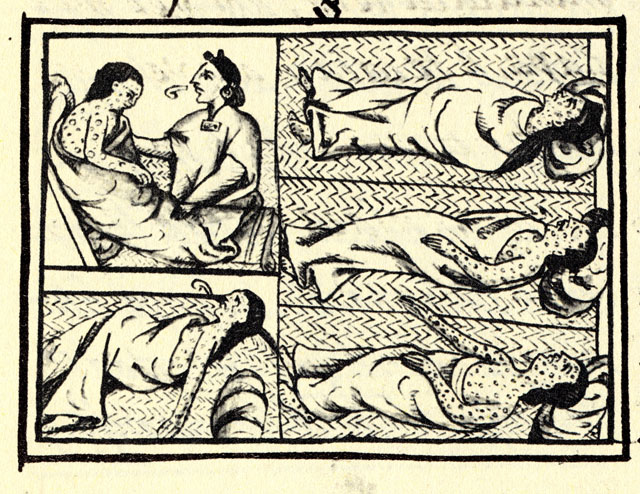
Nahua depiction of smallpox, in Book 12 of the Florentine Codex

The catastrophic fall in the indigenous populations of Spanish America was evident from the first contacts in the Caribbean, something that alarmed Bartolomé de las Casas. The impacts of the demographic collapse has continued to garner attention following the early studies by Sherburne F. Cook and Woodrow Borah, who examined censuses and other materials to make empirical assessments. The question of sources and numbers continues to be an issue in the field, with David P. Henige's Numbers from Nowhere, a useful contribution. Noble David Cook's Born to Die as well as Alfred Crosby's The Columbian Exchange are valuable and readable accounts of epidemic disease in the early colonial period. Regional studies of population decline have appeared for a number of areas including Mexico, Peru, Honduras, and Ecuador. The moral and religious implications of the collapse for Spanish Catholics is explored in an anthology with case studies from various parts of colonial Spanish America, The Secret Judgments of God. Religious and moral interpretations of disease gave way in the eighteenth century to scientific public health responses to epidemics.

== Institutional history ==
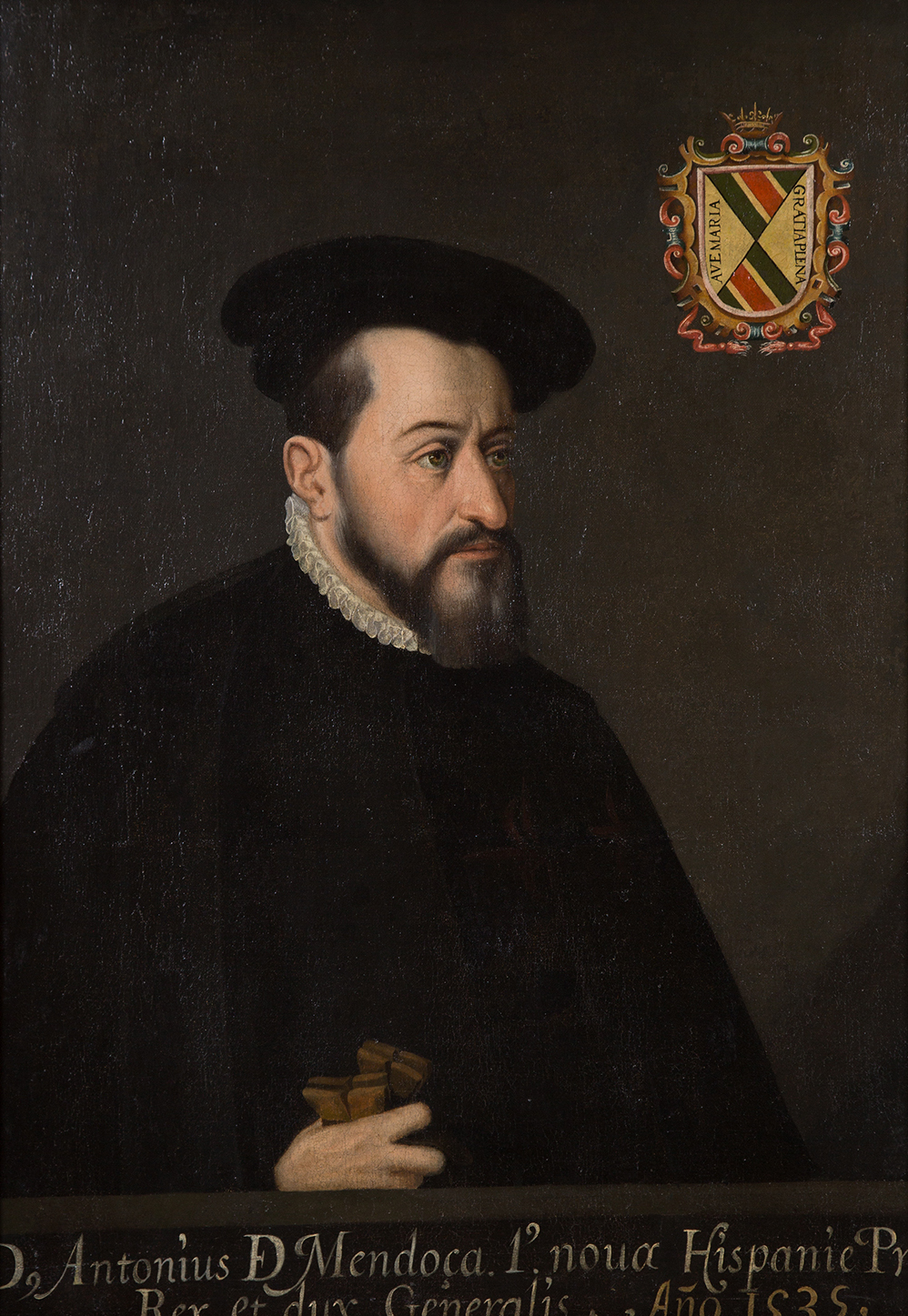
Don Antonio de Mendoza, first viceroy of New Spain, who set many lasting policies during his term

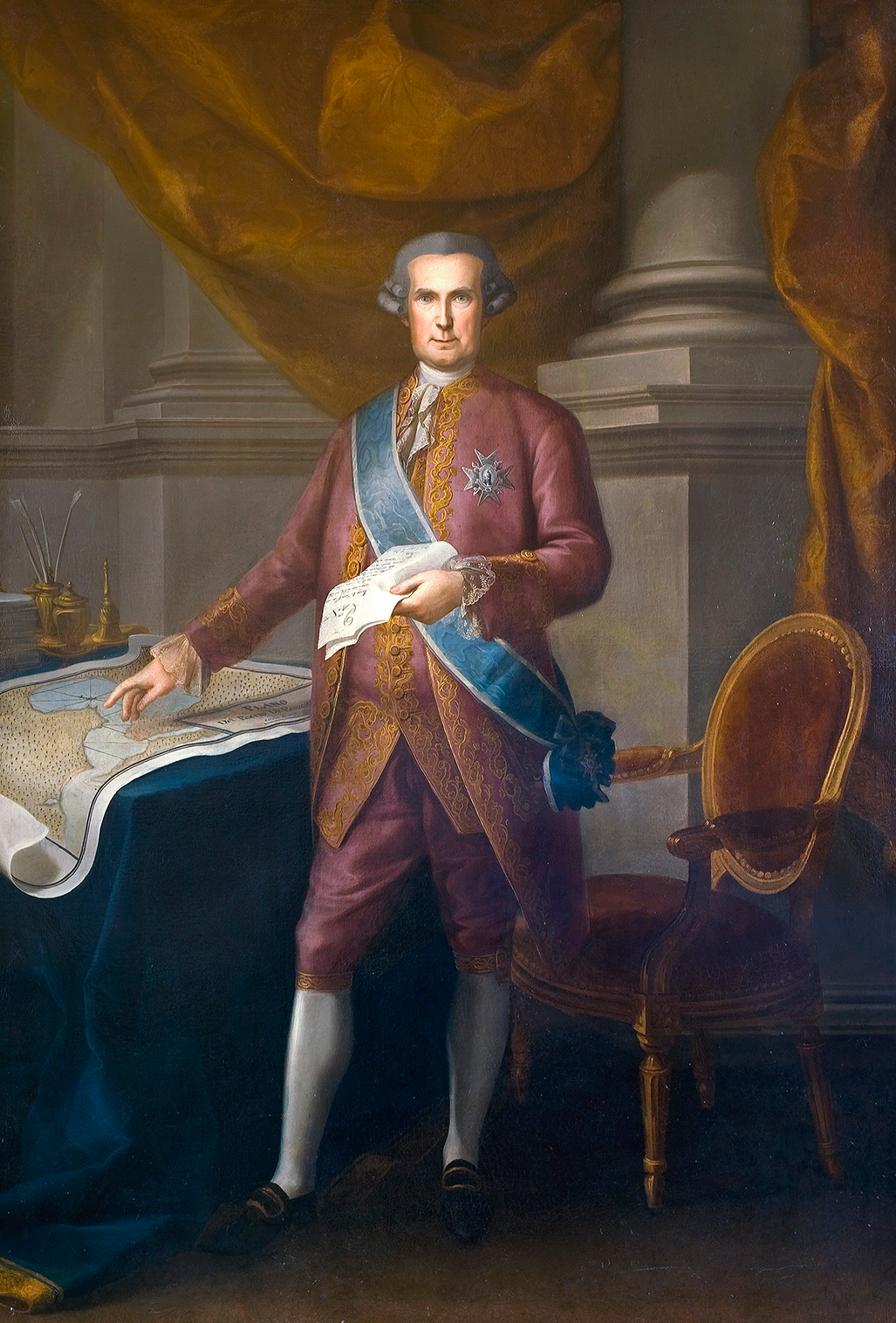
José de Gálvez (1720–1787), Visitador generál in New Spain and later member of the Council of the Indies, who implemented the Bourbon reforms

The institutional history of Spain's and Portugal's overseas empires was an early focus of historiography. Laying out the structures of crown rule (civil and ecclesiastical) created the framework to understand how the two overseas empires functioned. An early study in English of Spanish America was Edward Gaylord Bourne's four-volume Spain in America (1904), a historian who "viewe[ed] the Spanish colonial process dispassionately and thereby escape[d] the conventional Anglo-Protestant attitudes of outraged or tolerant disparagement." In 1918 Harvard professor of history Clarence Haring published a monograph examining the legal structure of trade in the Habsburg era, followed by his major work on the Spanish empire (1947). A relatively early, specialized study of the Caracas Company (1728–1784) is in this vein of institutional history. One of the few women publishing scholarly works in the early twentieth century was Lillian Estelle Fisher, whose studies of the viceregal administration and the intendant system were important contributions to institutional. Other important works dealing with institutions are Arthur Aiton's biography of the first viceroy, Don Antonio de Mendoza, who set many patterns for future administrators in Spanish America. and J.H. Parry on the high court of New Galicia and the sale of public office in the Spanish empire. Further research has been published more recently. An important institutional study by Mark A. Burkholder and Douglas S. Chandler examines collectively the high courts. Scholars have examined how flexible the Spanish bureaucracy was in practice, with John Leddy Phelan publishing a study of the bureaucracy of seventeenth-century Quito, and an important general article. A study of the bureaucracy of Mexico City from the late colonial era to the early Mexican republic is worth noting. Kenneth J. Andrien has examined the viceroyalty of Peru in the seventeenth century. Jonathan I. Israel's work on seventeenth-century Mexico is especially important, showing how creole elites shaped state power by mobilizing the urban plebe to resist actions counter to their interests.

The early Caribbean has been the focus of a few important works, but compared to the central areas, is much less studied. Worth noting are a study of sixteenth-century crown efforts at defense and works on colonial Florida.

The limits of royal power have also been examined. Woodrow Borah's Justice By Insurance (1983) shows how the Spanish crown's establishment of tax-funded legal assistance to Indians in Mexico provided the means for indigenous communities to litigate in the Spanish courts. A useful general examination in the twenty-first century is Susan E. Ramírez, "Institutions of the Spanish American Empire in the Habsburg Era". A recent development in the history of institutions focuses on cultural aspects of state power.

Church-state relations and religion in Spanish America have also been a focus of research, but in the early twentieth century, it did not receive as much attention as the subject merits. What has been called the "spiritual conquest," the early period of evangelization in Mexico, has received considerable treatment by scholars. Another classic publication on the period is John Leddy Phelan's work on the early Franciscans in Mexico. The economic foundations of the Catholic Church have been examined for the early colonial era. The Holy Office of the Inquisition in Spanish America has been a subject of inquiry since Henry Charles Lea's works at the turn of the twentieth century. In the twentieth century, Richard E. Greenleaf examined the Inquisition as an institution in sixteenth-century Mexico. Later work on the Inquisition has used it voluminous records for writing social history in Mexico and Peru.

The Bourbon Reforms of the late eighteenth century have been more broadly studied, examining the changes in administrative arrangements with the Spanish crown that resulted in the intendancy system.

An important shift in church-state relations during the Bourbon Reforms, was the crown's attempt to rein in the privileges of the clergy as it strengthened the prerogatives of the crown in a position known as regalism. Pamela Voekel has studied cultural aspects of the Bourbon reforms on religion and popular piety.

Trade and commerce in the Bourbon era have been examined, particularly the institution of comercio libre, the loosening of trade strictures within the Spanish Empire. The administrative reorganization opened up new ways for administrators and merchants to exploit the indigenous in Mexico via forced sale of goods in exchange for red dye production, cochineal, which was an extremely valuable commodity.

In the late eighteenth century Spain was forcibly made aware in the Seven Years' War by the capture of Havana and Manila by the British, that it needed to establish a military to defend its empire. The crown established a standing military and filled its ranks with locals.

== Social history ==
Scholars of Latin America have focused on characteristics of the region's populations, with particular interest in social differentiation and stratification, race and ethnicity, gender, sexuality, and family history, and the dynamics of colonial rule and accommodation or resistance to it. Social history as a field expanded its scope and depth beginning in the 1960s, although it was already developed as a field previous to that. An important 1972 essay by James Lockhart lays out a useful definition, "Social history deals with the informal, the unarticulated, the daily and ordinary manifestations of human existence, as a vital plasma in which all more formal and visible expressions are generated." Archival research utilizing untapped sources or those only partially utilized previously, such as notarial records, indigenous language materials, have allowed new insights into the functioning of colonial societies, particularly the role of non-elites. As one historian put it in 1986, "for the social historian, the long colonial siesta has long given way to sleepless frenzy."

=== Conquest era ===
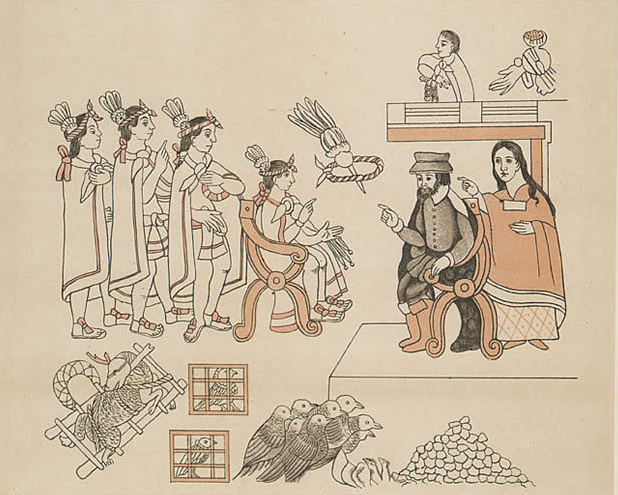
Hernán Cortés and La Malinche meet Moctezuma II in Tenochtitlan, November 8, 1519, shown in the pictorial history of the conquest, Lienzo de Tlaxcala(Facsimile c. 1890).

The social history of the conquest era shift in the way the period is treated, focusing less on events of the conquest and more on its participants. James Lockhart's path-breaking Spanish Peru (1968) concerns the immediate post-conquest era of Peru, deliberately ignoring the political events of the internecine conflicts between Spanish factions. Instead it shows how even during that era, Spanish patterns took hold and a multiracial colonial society took shape. His companion volume, The Men of Cajamarca examines the life patterns of the Spanish conquerors who captured the Inca emperor Atahualpa at Cajamarca who paid a huge ransom in gold for his freedom, and then murdered. The prosopographical study of these conquerors records as much extant information on each man in existing sources, with a general essay laying out the patterns that emerge from the data. A comparable work for the early history of Mexico is Robert Himmerich y Valencia's work on encomenderos. New research on encomenderos in Spanish South America has appeared in recent years.

Gender as a factor in the conquest era has also shifted the focus in the field. New work on Doña Marina/Malinche, Hernán Cortés's consort and cultural translator sought to contextualize her as a historical figure with a narrow range of choices. The work has aided the rehabilitation of her reputation from being a traitor to "her" people. The role of women more generally in the conquest has been explored for the Andean region.

The role of blacks in the conquest is now being explored, as well as Indians outside the main conquests of central Mexico and Peru.

=== Elites ===
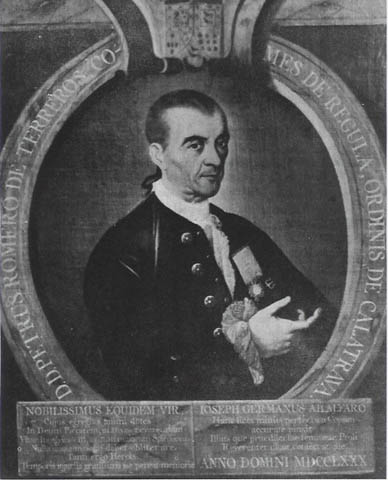
Pedro Romero de Terreros, the first count of Regla, a mining magnate of Mexico

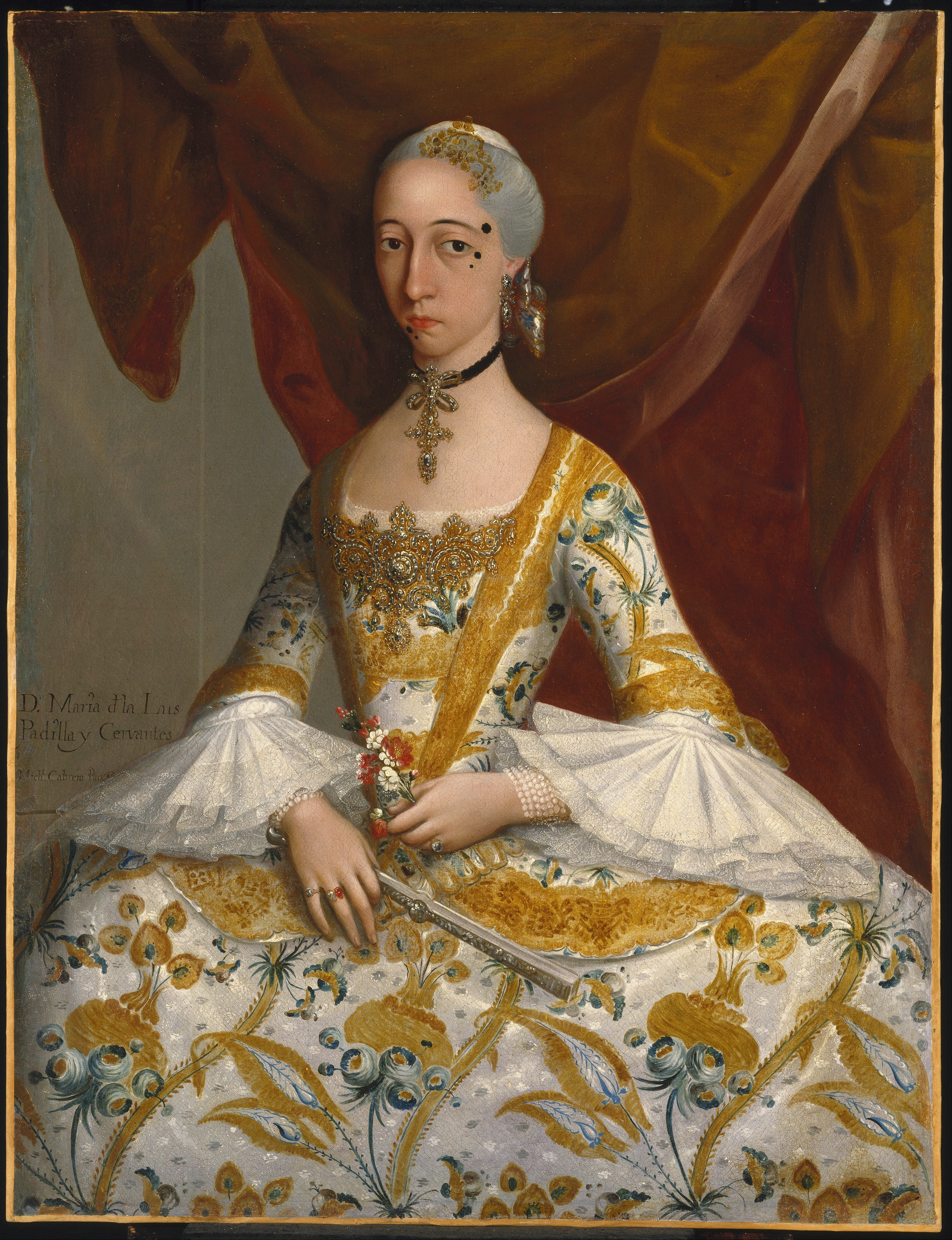
Doña María de la Luz Padilla y Gómez de Cervantes, ca. 1760. Oil on canvas by Miguel Cabrera, Brooklyn Museum

Among elites are crown officials, high churchmen, mining entrepreneurs, and transatlantic merchants, enmeshed in various relationships wielding or benefiting from power as well as the women of this strata, who married well or took the veil. Many are immortalized in contemporary portraits and the subject later, individual biographies or collective biographies.

The history of elites and the role of economic stratification remain important in the field, although there is now a concerted effort to expand research to non-elites. Elites lived in cities, the headquarters and nexus of civil and religious hierarchies and their large bureaucracies, the hubs of economic activity, and the residence of merchant elites and the nobility. A large number of studies of elites focus on particular cities: viceregal capital and secondary cities, which had a high court (audiencia) and the seat of a bishopric, or were ports from overseas trade. The intersection of silver entrepreneurs and elites in Mexico has been examined in D.A. Brading's classic Miners and Merchants in Bourbon Mexico, 1763–1810, focusing on Guanajuato and in Peter Bakewell's study of Zacatecas. Merchants in Mexico City have been studied as a segment of elites for Mexico City in the seventeenth and eighteenth centuries. as well as merchants in late colonial Veracruz. Merchants in other areas have been studies as well. Some extraordinarily successful economic elites, such as miners and merchants, were ennobled by the Spanish crown in the eighteenth century. Individual biographies of successful entrepreneurs have been published.

Churchmen who made an important imprint on their respective eras include Juan de Zumárraga, Pedro Moya de Contreras, Juan de Palafox y Mendoza, Carlos de Sigüenza y Góngora, and Manuel Abad y Queipo. A few nuns and uncloistered religious women (beatas) wrote spiritual biographies. Advocates for the formal church recognition of holy persons, such as Rosa of Lima, St. Mariana de Jesús de Paredes ("the Lily of Quito"), and St. Felipe de Jesús, wrote hagiographies, mustering evidence for their cases for beatification and canonization. Modern scholars have returned to colonial-era texts to place these women in a larger context.

Studies of ecclesiastics as a social grouping include one on the Franciscans in sixteenth-century Mexico. For eighteenth-century Mexico William B. Taylor's Magistrates of the Sacred on the secular clergy is a major contribution. An important study on the secular clergy in eighteenth-century Lima has yet to be published as a monograph. In recent years, studies of elite women who became nuns and the role of convents in colonial society have appeared. Elite indigenous women in Mexico had the possibility of becoming nuns, although not without controversy about their ability to follow a religious vocation.

=== Indigenous peoples ===
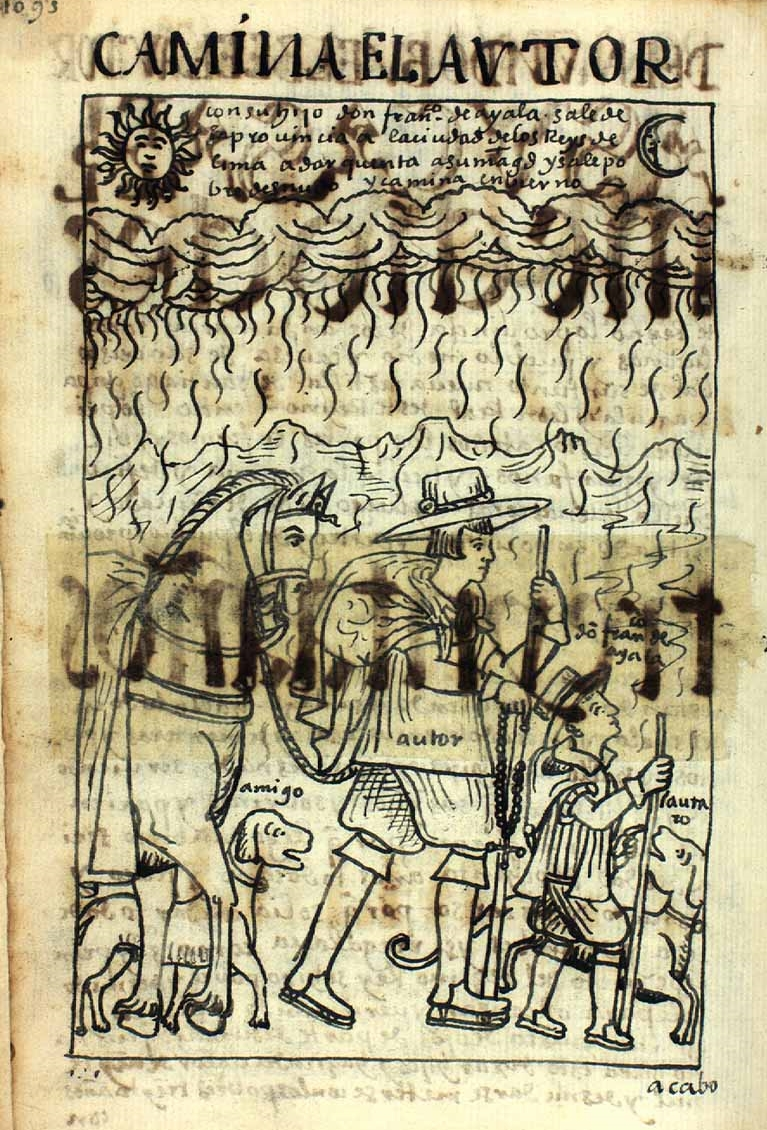
Guaman Poma de Ayala and his son on the way to Lima, illustration from his Nueva Coronica (NC, p. 1105)

The publication of The Cambridge History of the Native Peoples of the Americas gave recognition to the field of indigenous history or ethnohistory that had been developing during the twentieth century. Two volumes, each with two parts, cover the prehispanic and post-Contact history of indigenous peoples of Mesoamerica and South America In the twentieth century, historians and anthropologists of studying colonial Mexico worked to create a compendium of sources of Mesoamerican ethnohistory, resulting in four volumes of the Handbook of Middle American Indians being devoted to Mesoamerican ethnohistorical sources.

Two major monographs by historian Charles Gibson, the first on the post-conquest history of Tlaxcala, the indigenous polity that allied with Cortés against the Mexica, and the second, his monumental history of the Aztecs of central Mexico during the colonial era, were published by high-profile academic presses and remain classics in Spanish American historiography. Gibson was elected president of the American Historical Association in 1977, indicating how mainstream Mesoamerican ethnohistory had become. Litigation by Mexican Indians in Spanish courts in Mexico generated a huge archive of information in Spanish about how the indigenous adapted to colonial rule, which Gibson and other historians have drawn on. Scholars utilizing texts in indigenous languages have expanded the understanding the social, political, and religious history of indigenous peoples, particularly in Mexico.

Indigenous history of the Andean area has expanded significantly in recent years. Andean peoples also petitioned and litigated in the Spanish courts to forward their own interests.

The topic of indigenous rebellion against Spanish rule has been explored in central and southern Mexico and the Andes. One of the first major rebellions in Mexico is the 1541 Mixtón War, in which indigenous in central Mexico's west rose up and a full-scale military force led by New Spain's first viceroy. Work on rebellion in central Mexican villages showed that they were local and generally short-lived. and in the southern Maya area there were more long-standing patterns of unrest with religious factors playing a role, such as the Tzeltal Rebellion of 1712. Seventeenth-century rebellions in northern Mexico have also garnered attention.

Andean resistance and rebellion have increasingly been studied as a phenomenon. The indigenous writer Felipe Guaman Poma de Ayala (1535–ca. 1626) who authored El primer nueva corónica y buen gobierno has garnered significant attention. The nearly 1,200-page, richly illustrated manuscript by an elite Andean is a critique of Spanish rule in the Andes that can be considered a lengthy petition to the Spanish monarch to ameliorate abuses of colonial rule. General accounts of resistance and rebellion have been published. The great eighteenth-century rebellion of Tupac Amaru that challenged colonial rule has been the focus of much scholarship.

=== Race ===
The study of race dates to the earliest days of the Spanish Empire, with debates about the status of the indigenous – whether they had souls, whether they could be enslaved, whether they could be Catholic priests, whether they were subject to the Inquisition. The decisions steered crown and ecclesiastical policy and practices. With the importation of Africans as slaves during the early days of European settlement in the Caribbean and the emergence of race mixture, social hierarchies and racial categories became complex. The legal division between the República de indios, that put the indigenous population in a separate legal category from the República de españoles that included Europeans, Africans, and mixed-race castas was the crown's policy to rule its vassals with racial status as one criterion.

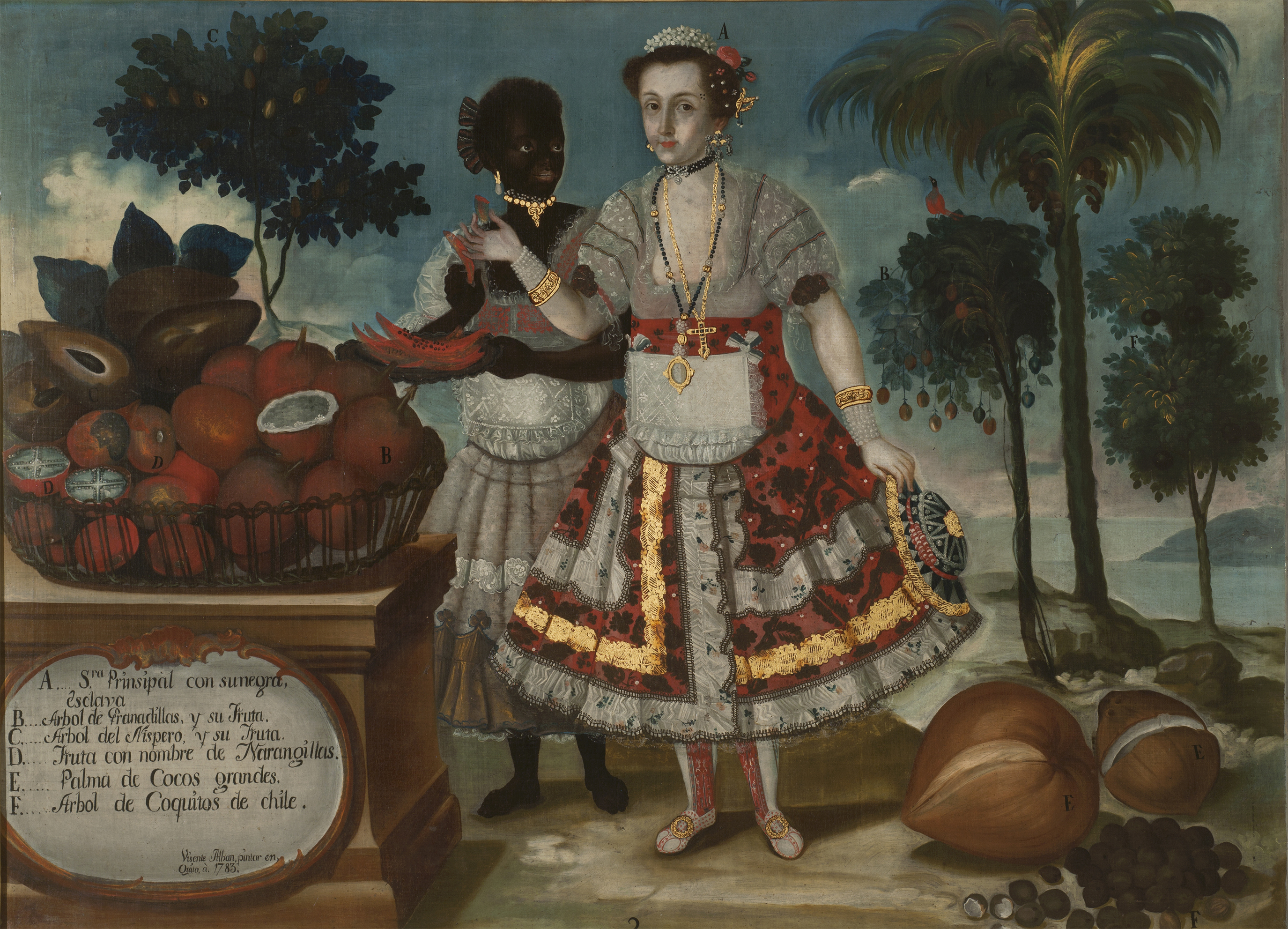
An elite woman with her black slave, Quito

Much scholarly work has been published in recent years on social structure and race, with an emphasis on how Africans were situated in the legal structure, their socioeconomic status, place within the Catholic Church, and cultural expressions. Modern studies of race in Spanish America date to the 1940s with the publication of Gonzalo Aguirre Beltrán's monograph on Africans in Mexico. In the United States, the 1947 publication of Frank Tannenbaum's Slave and Citizen: The Negro in the Americas cast Latin American slavery as more benevolent compared to that in the United States. In Tannenbaum's work, he argued that although slaves in Latin America were in forced servitude, they incorporated into society as Catholics, could sue for better treatment in Spanish courts, had legal routes to freedom, and in most places abolition was without armed conflict, such as the Civil War in the United States. The work is still a center of contention, with a number of scholars dismissing it as being wrong or outdated, while others consider the basic comparison still holding and simply no longer label it as the "Tannenbaum thesis."

The 1960s marked the beginning of an upsurge in studies of race and race mixture. Swedish historian Magnus Mörner's 1967 Race Mixture in the History of Latin America, published by a trade press and suitable for college courses, remained important for defining the issues surrounding race. The historiography on Africans and slavery in Latin America was examined in Frederick Bowser's 1972 article in Latin American Research Review, summarizing research to date and prospects for further investigation. His major monograph, The African Slave in Colonial Peru, African Slave in Colonial Peru, 1524–1650, marked a significant advance in the field, utilizing rich archival sources and broadening the research area to Peru.

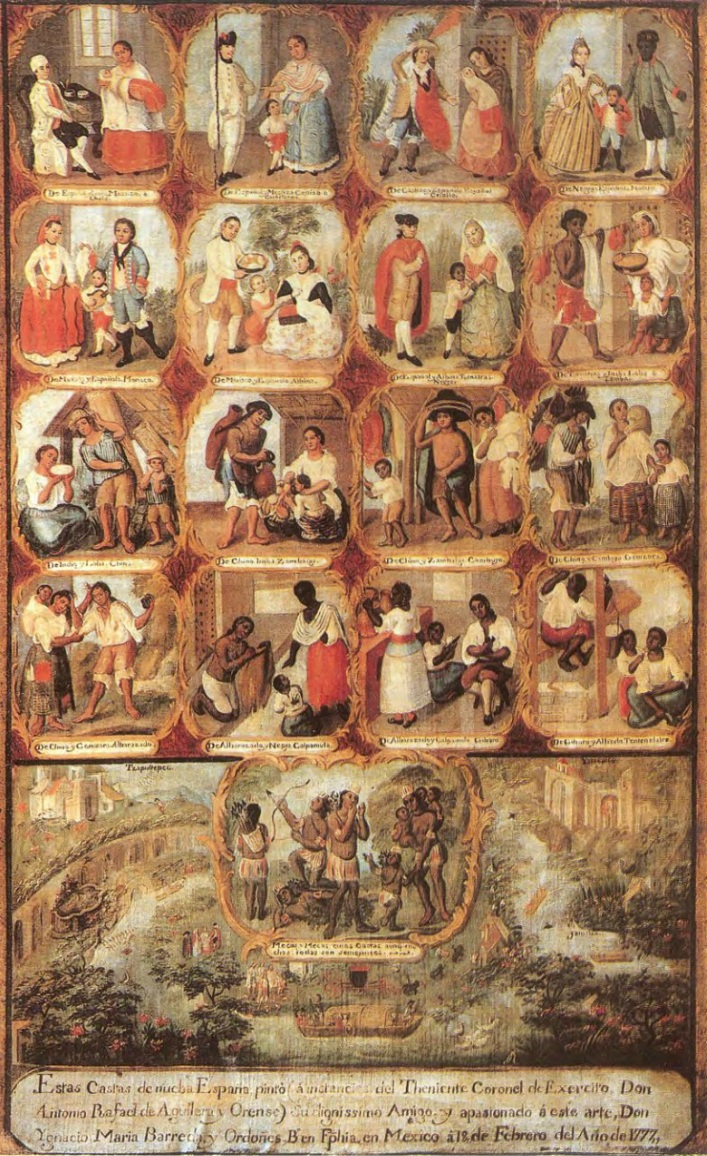
Depiction of the casta system in 18th c. Mexico

The debates about race, class, and "caste" took off in the 1970s with works by a number of scholars. Scholars have been also interested in how racial hierarchy has been depicted visually in the eighteenth-century flowering of the secular genre of casta painting. These paintings from the elite viewpoint show racial stereotypes with father of one race, mother of another, and their offspring labeled in yet another category.

Elites' concern about racial purity or "limpieza de sangre" (purity of blood), which in Spain largely revolved around whether one was of pure Christian heritage, in Spanish America encompassed the "taint" of non-white admixture. A key work is María Elena Martínez's Genealogical Fictions, showing the extent to which elite families sought erase blemishes from genealogies. Another essential work to understand the workings of race in Spanish America is Ann Twinam's work on petitions to the crown by mulattos and pardos for dispensation from their non-white status, to pursue education or a profession, and later as a blanket request not tied to professional rules prohibiting non-whites to practice. In the decades following Tannenbaum's work, there were few of these documents, known cédulas de gracias al sacar, with just four cases identified, but the possibility of upward social mobility played an important role in framing scholarly analysis of dynamics of race in Spanish America. Considerable work on social mobility preceded that work, with R. Douglas Cope's The Limits of Racial Domination remaining important.

The incorporation of blacks and indigenous into Spanish American Catholicism meant that they were part of the spiritual community. Recent work indicates that blacks in Castile were classified as "Old Christians" and obtained licenses to migrate to the Spanish Indies, where many became artisans and a few became wealthy and prominent. The Church did not condemn slavery as such. The Church generally remained exclusionary in the priesthood and kept separate parish registers for different racial categories. Black and indigenous confraternities (cofradías) provided a religious structure for reinforcement of ties among their members.

Work on blacks and Indians, and mixed categories, has expanded to include complexities of interaction not previously examined. Works by Matthew Restall and others explore race in Mexico. There is also new work on the colonial Andes as well.

=== Gender, sexuality, and family ===
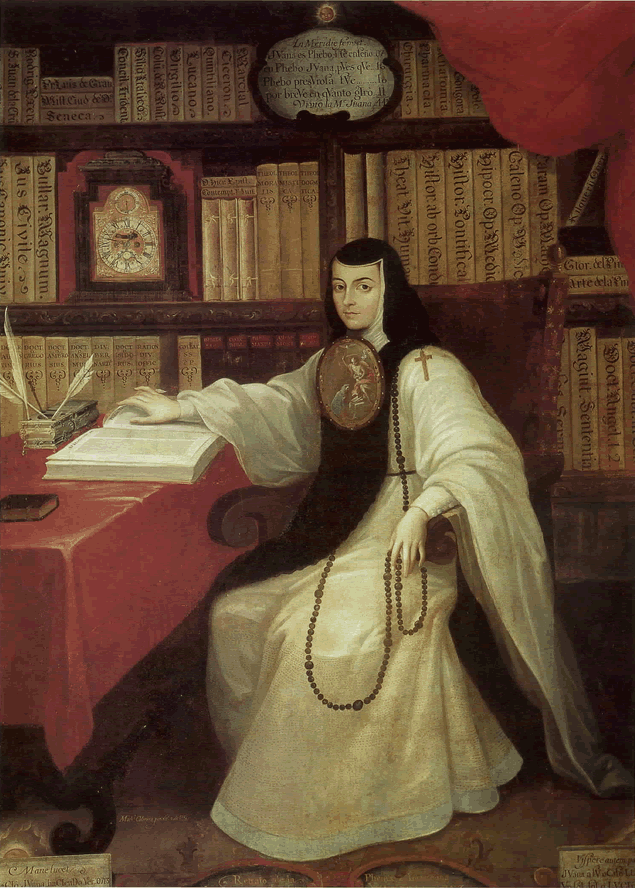
Sor Juana Inés de la Cruz, 17th c. Mexican intellectual known in her lifetime as the "Tenth Muse." Painting by Miguel Cabrera

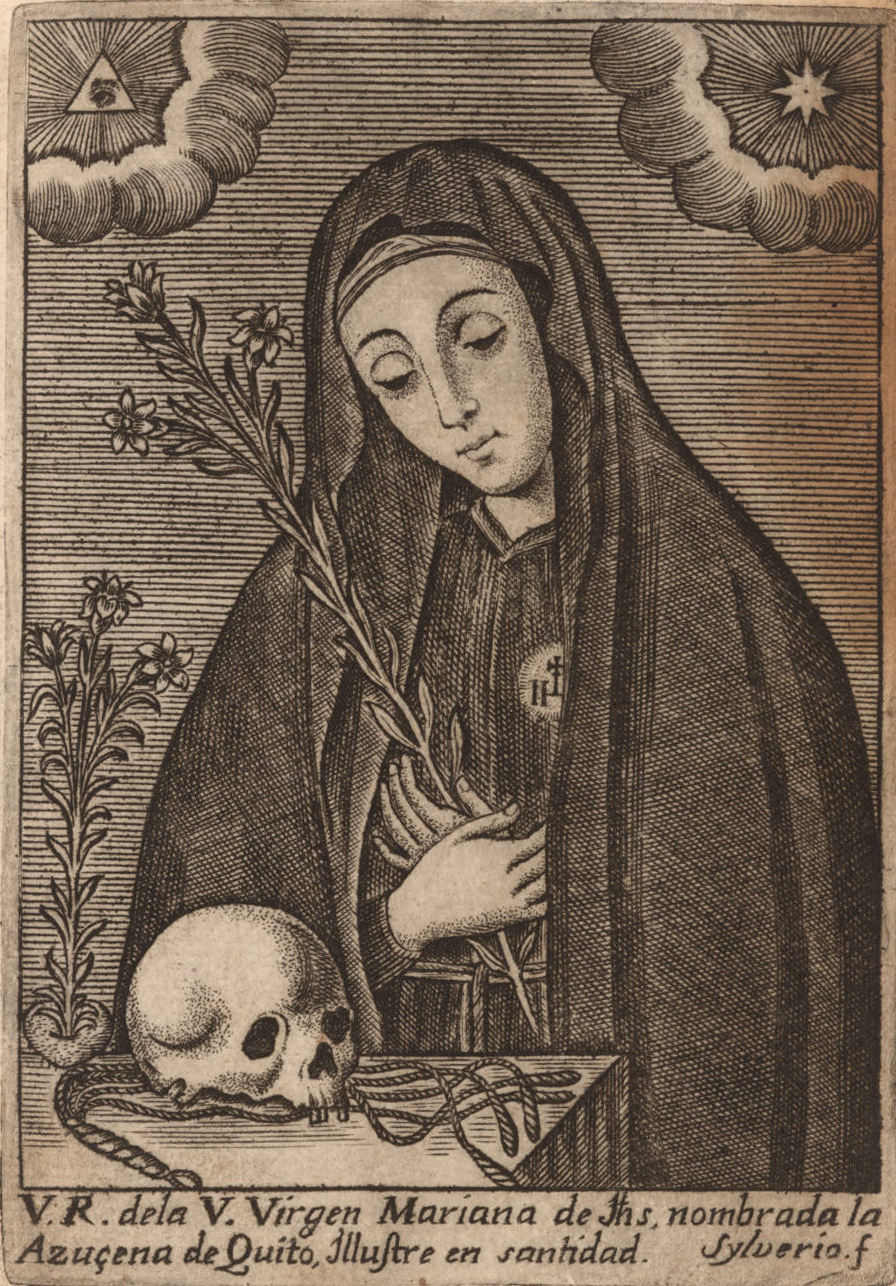
St Mariana de Jesús, the "Lily of Quito," known for her spirituality

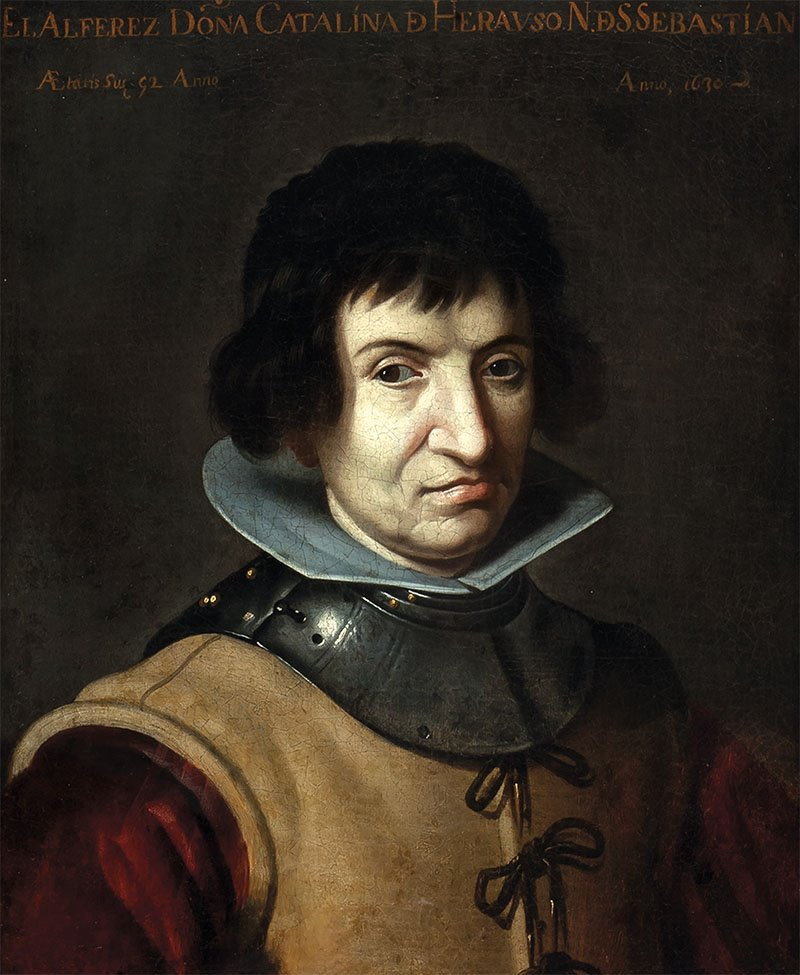
Catalina de Erauso, the "lieutenant nun"

Women's history and gender history developed as a field of Spanish American history in tandem with its emergence in the United States and Europe, with Asunción Lavrin being a pioneer. Works continue to increase, gain scholarly attention, and historiographic assessment. Studies of elites generally has led to the understanding of the role of elite women in colonial Spanish America as holders of property, titles, and repositories of family honor. Crown concerns over inappropriate choice of marriage partners, such as mixed-race unions or partners of unequal socioeconomic status, prompted edicts empowering parents to control marital decisions.

Early works on Mexican nun Sor Juana Inés de la Cruz, a singular seventeenth-century poet, famous in her own time, widened to study elite women who were eligible to become nuns, and further expanded to examine the lives of ordinary, often mixed-race, urban women. Nuns and convents have been well studied. Spanish American holy women such as Saint Rose of Lima and the Lily of Quito, beatas, as well as the popular saint of Puebla, Mexico, Catarina de San Juan, have been the subject of recent scholarly work.

Gender has been the central issue of recent works on urban and indigenous women. The role of indigenous women in colonial societies has been explored in a series of recent works.

The history of sexuality has expanded in recent years from studies of marriage and sexuality to homosexuality, and other expressions of sexuality, including bestiality. Of particular note is Ann Twinam's work on honor and illegitimacy in the colonial era; there is a similar work for Peru. The memoir of the nun-turned-cross-dressing soldier, Catalina de Erauso, is a picaresque tale and one of the few autobiographies form the colonial era. The problem of priests soliciting sexual favors in the confessional box and church responses to the abuse draws on Inquisition cases.

Records of the Holy Office of the Inquisition have been a fruitful archival source on women in Mexico and Peru, which include women of color. Inquisition records by definition record information about those who have run afoul of the religious authorities, but they are valuable for preserving information on mixed-race and non-elite men and women and the transgressions, many of which were sexual, that brought them before the tribunal.

A useful contribution to gender and the history of medicine is Nora E. Jaffary's Reproduction and Its Discontents: Childbirth and Contraception from 1750–1905, which examines the understandings of virginity, conception, and pregnancy; contraception, abortion and infanticide; and "monstrous births" in Mexican colonial and nineteenth-century history.

Women have been studied in the context of family history, such as the work of Pilar Gonzalbo Aizpuru and others. The history of children in Spanish America has become a recent focus.

== Religion and culture ==
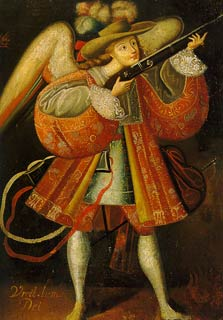
Archangel Uriel, anonymous, 18th century, Cuzco School, typical harquebus angel, likely by an indigenous artist

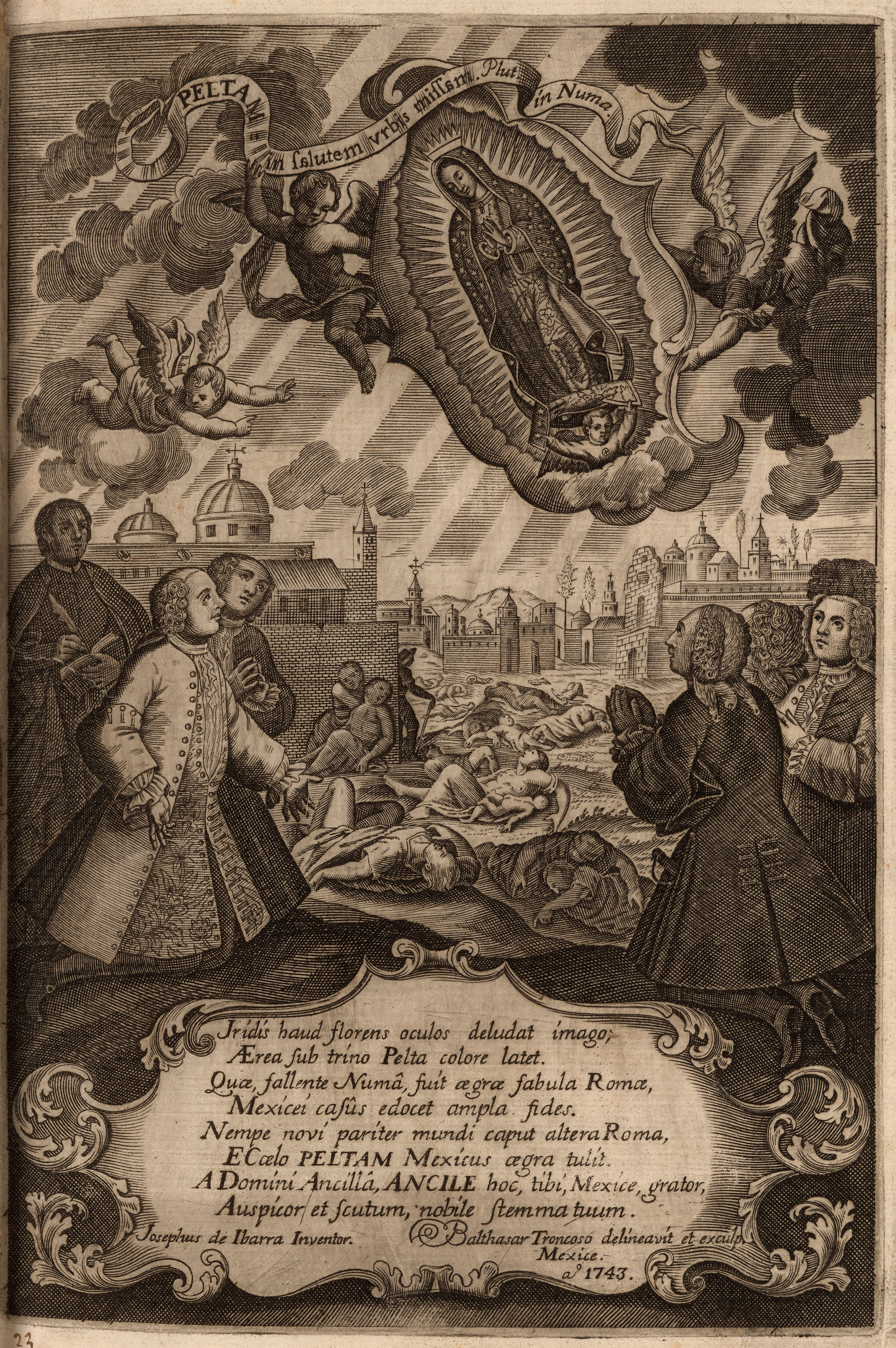
Creoles appealing to the Virgin of Guadalupe during an eighteenth-century epidemic afflicting the indigenous in Mexico City, 1743

The conversion and incorporation of the indigenous into Christendom was a key aim of Spanish colonialism. The classic work of Robert Ricard examines the sixteenth-century "spiritual conquest" prior to the arrival of the Jesuits. Although much scholarly work has been done since it was originally published in 1933 in French, it remains an important work. Translating Christian texts to indigenous languages and creating dictionaries was a crucial element in the project. A great deal has been written about Central Mexico and Nahuatl texts, with Louise Burkhart's The Slippery Earth being particularly important., but clerics in the Andean region grappled with the issues as well.

There is a long tradition of writings by Spanish religious personnel, but more recently there has been an expansion of research on indigenous Catholicism and deeper research on cultural aspects the spiritual conquest, such as religious theater and dance. In Mexico, indigenous language sources have given new perspectives on religious belief and practice. For the Maya area, there have been a number of important studies. An important work on Maya religion is Victoria Reifler Bricker's The Indian Christ, The Indian King. Religion has been an important focus of new work in Andean history, particularly persistence of indigenous beliefs and resistance to Catholic conversion.

Art and architecture playing an important role in creating visible embodiments of religious culture. Images of saints and religious allegories, and churches that ranged from magnificent cathedrals to modest parish churches and mission chapels. Reshaping indigenous worship also entailed the introduction of Christian saints. In Mexico, the story of the Virgin of Guadalupe, said to have appeared in 1531 to a Nahua man, Juan Diego, became the major religious cult of colonial Mexico and into the modern era, an essential part of Mexican identity as well as "Queen of the Americas."

Colonial architecture in Mexico has been the subject of a number of important studies, with church architecture as a significant component. Replacing sacred worship spaces of the ancient religion with visible manifestations of Christianity was a high priority for the "spiritual conquest" of the early evangelical period. Studies of architecture in Spanish South America and particularly the Andean region is increasing. Until the mid eighteenth century, the subject of most paintings was religious in some form or other, so that the historiography of colonial visual culture is weighted toward religion. Publication on colonial art has a long tradition, especially in Mexico. In recent years there has been a boom in publications on colonial art, with some useful overviews published. Major exhibitions on colonial art have resulted in fine catalogues as a permanent record, with many examples of colonial religious art.

Rituals and festivals reinforced religious culture in Spanish America. The enthusiasm for expressions of public piety during the sixteenth and seventeenth centuries was seen as part of "baroque culture." Specific religious celebrations, such as Corpus Christi have been studied in both Mexico and Peru.

The autos de fe of the Inquisition were public rituals enforcing religious orthodoxy with the participation of the highest civil and religious authorities and throngs of the faithful observing. There were a variety of transgressions that brought men and women before the Inquisition, including practicing Judaism while passing as Catholic (judizantes), bigamy, sexual transgressions, blasphemy, and priests soliciting in the confessional. Mocking religious sacraments could bring one before religious authorities, such as the case of the "marriage" of two dogs in late colonial Mexico.

In the eighteenth century, the crown sought to curtail public manifestations of piety ("baroque display") by bringing in new regulations. Pamela Voekel's Alone Before God: Religious Origins of Modernity in Mexico shows how the crown targeted elaborate funerary rites and mourning as an expression of excessive public piety. Mandating that burials be outside the consecrated ground of churches and church yards but rather in suburban cemeteries, elites pushed back. They had used such public displays as a way of demonstrating their wealth and position among the living and guaranteeing their eternal rest in the best situated places in churches. Another crown target was Carnaval celebrations in Mexico City, which plebeians joined with enthusiasm since Carnaval generally overturned or mocked traditional order, including religious authorities. Also to better ensure public order of plebeians, the crown sought to regulate taverns as well as public drinking, particularly during festivals. Since elites consumed alcohol in their private residences, the regulations were aimed at controlling commoners.

== History of science ==
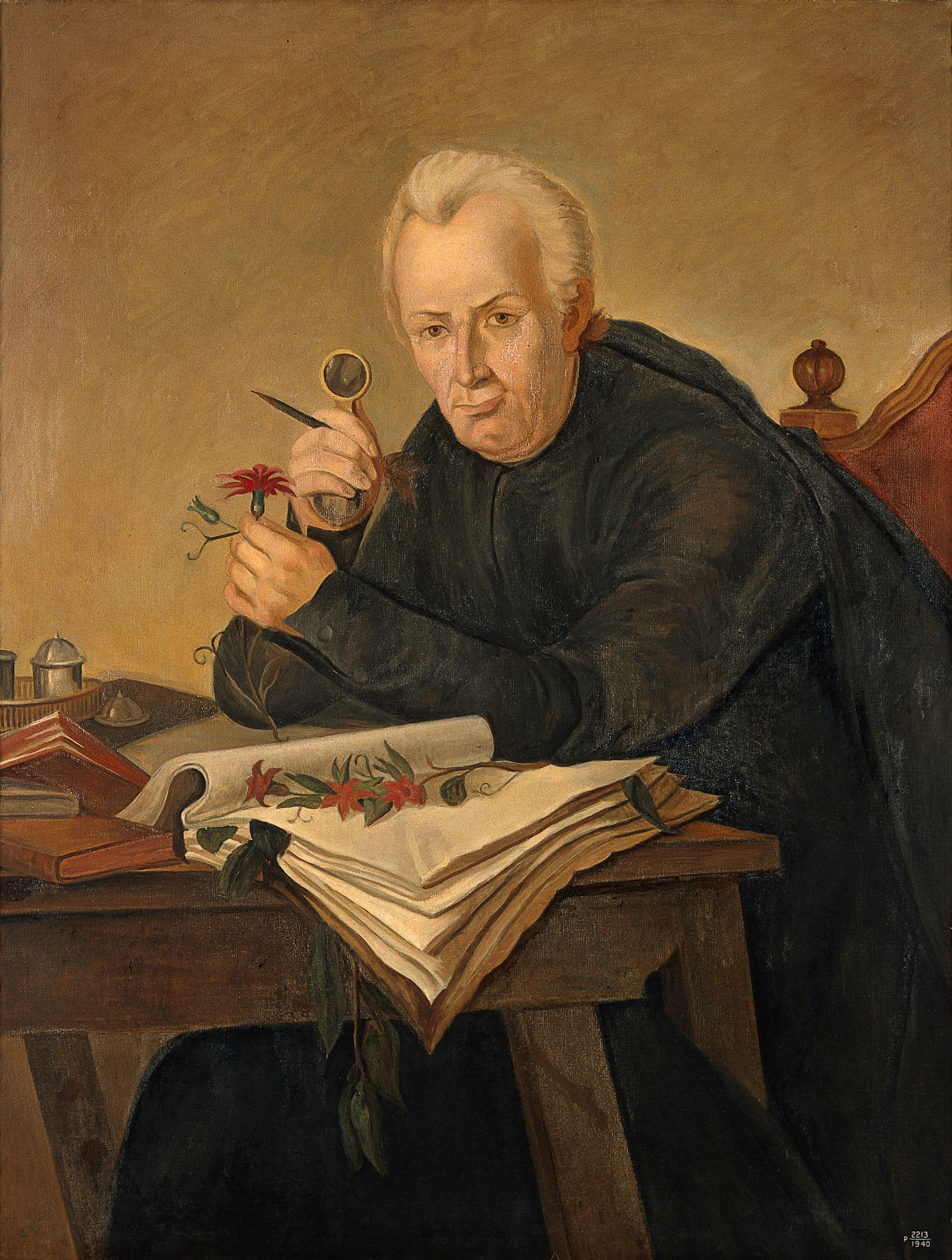
Cleric José Celestino Mutis, head of the Royal Botanical Expedition to New Granada (1783–1816), whose work deeply impressed Alexander von Humboldt.

At the same time that the crown was attempting to suppress baroque religious culture, it was promoting scientific work, to which eighteenth-century clerics contributed. These include José Antonio de Alzate y Ramírez, and José Celestino Mutis. Seventeenth-century Mexican polymath secular priest Don Carlos de Sigüenza y Góngora made astronomical observations as did his Jesuit contemporary Eusebio Kino. In the earlier period, Franciscan Bernardino de Sahagún's collection of information on Aztec classification "earthly" things in Book XI, such as the flora, fauna, soil types, land forms, and the like in the Florentine Codex was not clearly related to the project's religious aims.

The Spanish American Enlightenment produced a huge body of information on Spain's overseas empire via scientific expeditions. The most famous scientific traveler in Spanish America was Alexander von Humboldt, whose travel writings and scientific observations remain important sources for the history of Spanish America, most especially his Political Essay on the Kingdom of New Spain (1811); but other works as well. Humboldt's expedition was authorized by the crown, but was self-funded from his personal fortune. Prior to Humboldt's famous expedition, the crown funded a number of important scientific expeditions to Peru and Chile (1777–78), New Granada (1783–1816), New Spain (1787–1803), which scholars are examining afresh.

Beyond examining particular expeditions, history of science in Spain and the Spanish Empire has blossomed generally, with primary sources being published in scholarly editions or reissued, as well the publication of a considerable number of important scholarly studies.

== Economic history ==
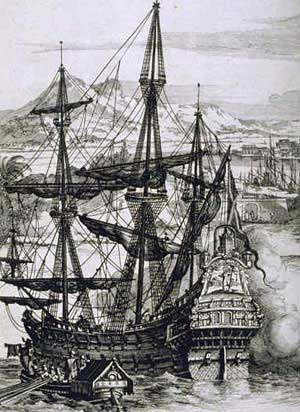
Spanish galleon, the mainstay of transatlantic and transpacific shipping, engraving by Albert Durer

Trade and commerce, commodity production, and labor systems have been extensively studied in colonial Spanish America. An important collection of articles is found in The Cambridge Economic History of Latin America: Volume 1: The Colonial Era and the Short Nineteenth Century, as well as in the first two volumes of The Cambridge History of Latin America. As with other aspects of colonial history, economic history does not fit neatly into a single category, since it is bound up with crown policy, the existence of exploitable resources, such as silver, credit, capital and entrepreneurs. In the development of the agricultural sector, the availability of fertile soil and adequate water, expanses of land for grazing of cattle and sheep, as well as the availability of labor, either coerced or free were factors. The export economy relying on silver production and to a lesser extent dye for European textile production stimulated the growth of regional development. Profitable production of foodstuffs and other commodities, such as wool, for local consumption marked the development of a colonial economy. General works on economic history continue to contribute to the understanding colonial Spanish America.

=== Early labor systems ===
Following on precedents in Spain following the Catholic reconquest of Muslim Spain, conquerors expected material rewards for their participation, which in that period was the encomienda. In Spanish America, the encomienda was a grant of indigenous labor and tribute from a particular community to private individuals, assumed to be in perpetuity for their heirs. Where the encomienda initially functioned best was in regions where indigenous populations were hierarchically organized and were already used to rendering tribute and labor. Central Mexico and the Andes presented that pattern. The encomienda has an institution has been well studied concerning its impacts on indigenous communities and how Spanish encomenderos profited from the system. James Lockhart examined the shift from encomienda labor awarded to just a few Spaniards, to the attempt by the crown to expand access to labor via the repartimiento to later arriving Spaniards who had been excluded from the original awards. This also had the effect of undermining the growing power of the encomendero group and the shift to free labor and the rise of the landed estate. In Central America, forced labor continued as a system well into the nineteenth century. Regional variations on the encomienda have been studied in Paraguay, an area peripheral to Spanish economic interests. The encomienda there was less labor coercion than mobilizing networks of indigenous kin that Spaniards joined.

Slave labor was utilized in various parts of Spanish America. African slave labor was introduced in the early Caribbean during the demographic collapse of the indigenous populations. The slave trade was in the hands of the Portuguese, who had an early monopoly on the coastal routes in Africa. Africans learned skilled trades and functioned as artisans in cities and labor bosses over indigenous in the countryside. Studies of the African slave trade and the economic role of blacks in Spanish America have increased, particularly with the development of Atlantic history. Asian slaves in Spanish America have been less well studied, but monograph on Mexico indicates the promise of this topic. One of the few women to achieve fame in colonial Mexico was Catarina de San Juan, a slave in seventeenth-century Puebla.

The mobilization of indigenous labor in the Andes via the mita for the extraction of silver has been studied. Encomienda or repartimiento labor was not an option in Mexico's north; the workforce was of free laborers, who initially migrated from elsewhere to the mining zone.

=== Silver ===
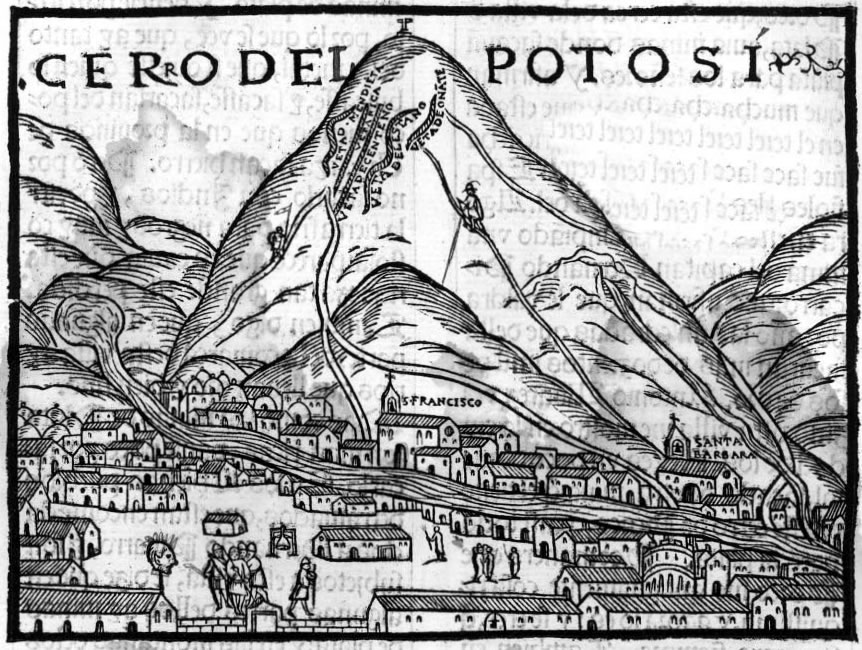
Potosi, the "cerro rico" that produced massive amounts of silver from a single site. The first image published in Europe. Pedro Cieza de León, 1553.

The major motor of the Spanish colonial economy was silver mining, which produced in upper Peru (now Bolivia) at the single site of production, Potosí. There were multiple sites in Mexico, mainly in the north outside the zone of dense indigenous population, which initially necessitated pacification of the indigenous populations to secure the mining sites and the north–south transportation routes.

Silver and silver mining have occupied an important place in the history of Spanish America and the Spanish Empire, since the two major sources of silver were found in the viceroyalties of New Spain (Mexico) and Peru, where there were significant numbers of indigenous and Spanish colonists. With changes in eighteenth-century crown policies, silver production was revived after a slump in the seventeenth century. The impact of silver on the world economy was profound in both Europe and Asia. An early twentieth-century study dealing with the impact of colonial silver on Spain is Earl Hamilton”s. American Treasure and the Price Revolution in Spain. Extensive work on the royal treasury by Herbert S. Klein and John Tepaske on colonial Spanish American and Spain is The Royal Treasuries of the Spanish Empire in America (3 vols.) Other important publications on economic history include the comparison of New Spain and Peru, and on price history. Mercury was a key component to the process of extracting silver from ore. Mercury for Mexican mining production was shipped from the Almadén mine in Spain, while mercury production in Peru was from the mine at Huancavelica.

=== Other commodity production ===
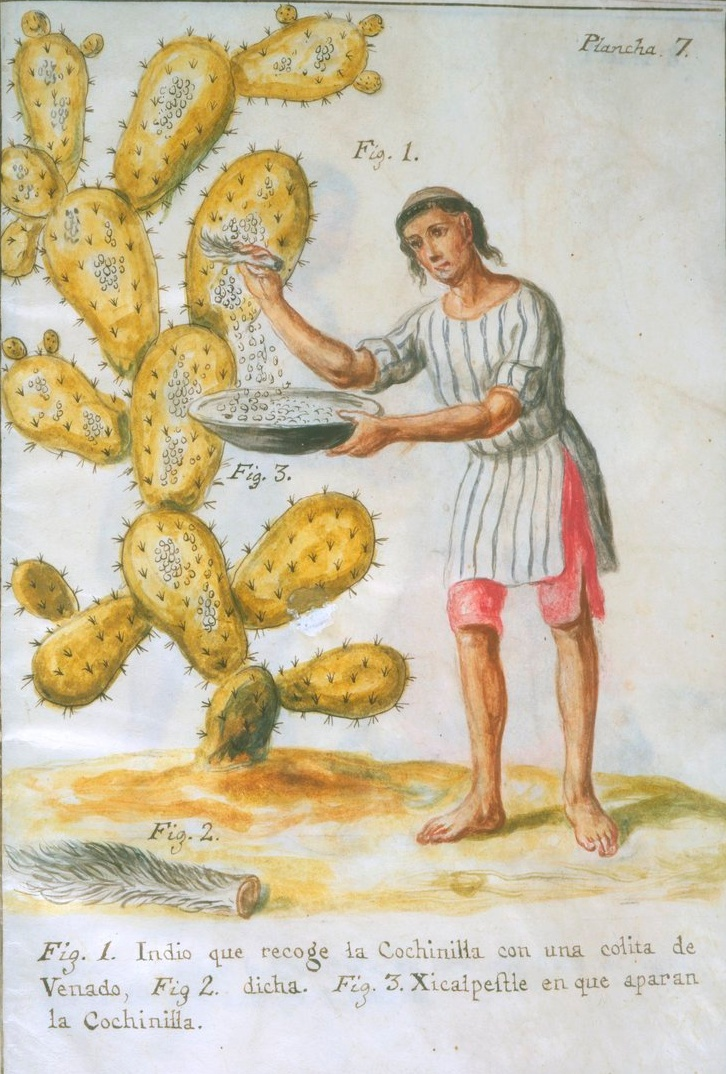
Mexican Indian Collecting Cochineal with a Deer Tail by José Antonio de Alzate y Ramírez (1777)

For a number of years scholars deeply researched landed estates, haciendas, and debated whether haciendas were feudal or capitalist and how they contributed to the economic development. More recently, scholars have focused on commodity chains and their contribution to globalization, rather than focusing solely on production sites.

Sugar as a commodity was cultivated from the earliest colonization in the Caribbean and brought to Mexico by Hernán Cortés, which supplied domestic demand. There is a vast literature about sugar plantations in various regions of Spanish America and Brazil. Another tropical export product was cacao, which was grown in Mesoamerica. Once Europeans developed a taste for chocolate, with the addition of sugar, cacao production expanded.

The production of mind-altering commodities was an important source of profit for entrepreneurs and the Spanish administration. Tobacco as a commodity was especially important in the late eighteenth century when the crown created a monopoly on its production and processing. Demand by the urban poor for local production of pulque, the fermented alcohol from agave cacti, made it profitable, so that large-scale cultivation, including by Jesuit landed estates, met demand; the crown regulated taverns where it was consumed. Coca, the Andean plant now processed into cocaine, was grown and the unprocessed leaves consumed by indigenous particularly in mining areas. Production and distribution of coca became big business, with non-indigenous owners of production sites, speculators, and merchants, but consumers consisting of indigenous male miners and local indigenous women sellers. The church benefited from coca production since it was by far the most valuable agricultural product and contributor to the tithe.

Most high quality textiles were imported from Europe via the transatlantic trade controlled by Iberian merchants, but Mexico briefly produced silk. As demand for cheap textiles grew, production for a growing local mass market took place in small-scale textile workshops (obrajes), which had low capital inputs, since the expansion of sheep ranching provided a local supply of wool, and low labor costs, with obrajes functioning in some cases as jails. Spanish America is most noted for producing dyes for European textile production, in particular the red dye cochineal, made from the crushed bodies of insects that grew on nopal cactuses, and indigo. Cochineal was for Mexico its second most important export after silver, and the mechanisms to engage indigenous in Oaxaca involved crown officials and urban merchants. The blue dye indigo was another important export, particularly from Central America.

=== Trade and transportation ===
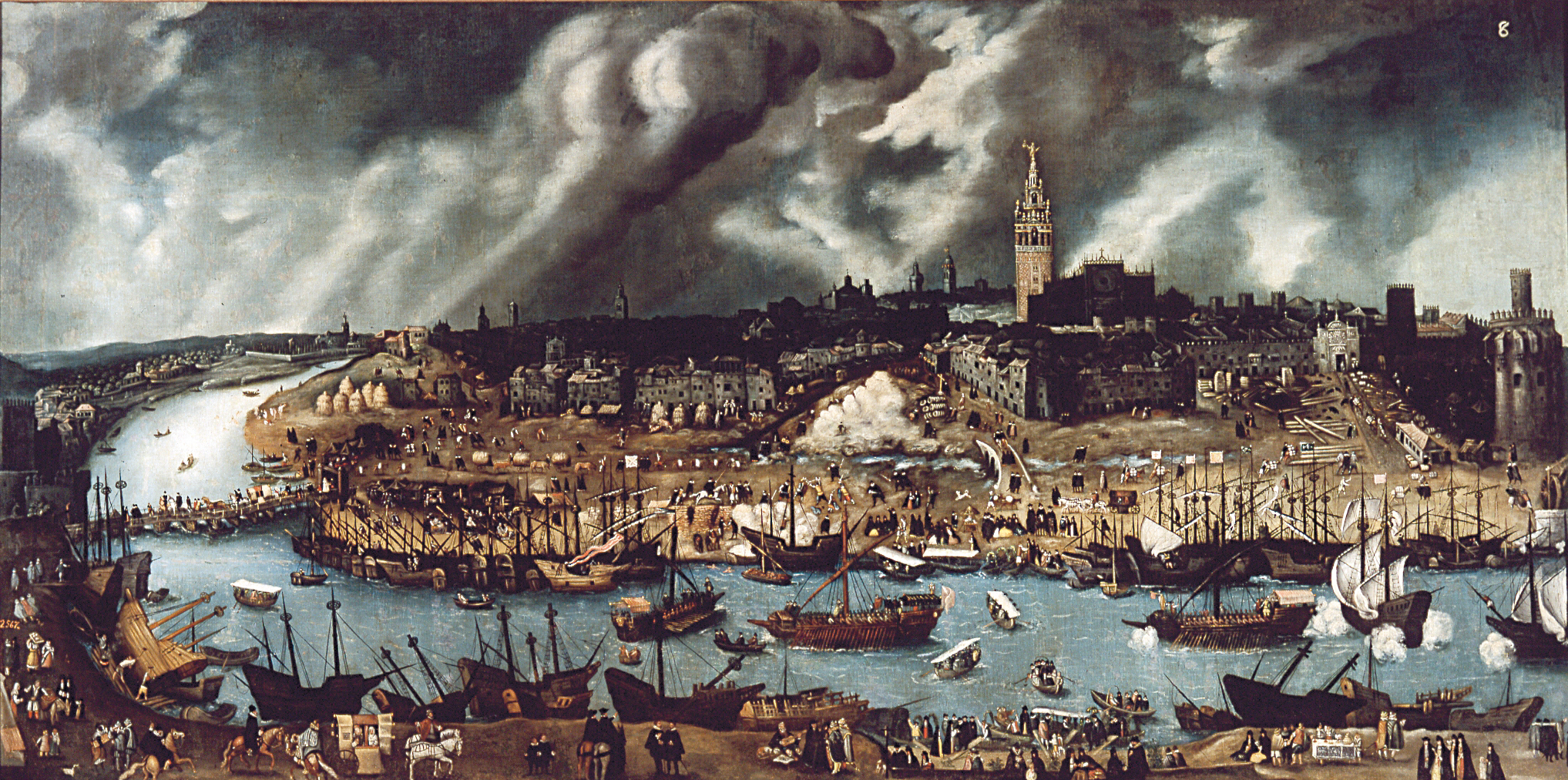
16th c. Seville, Spanish port for the transatlantic trade

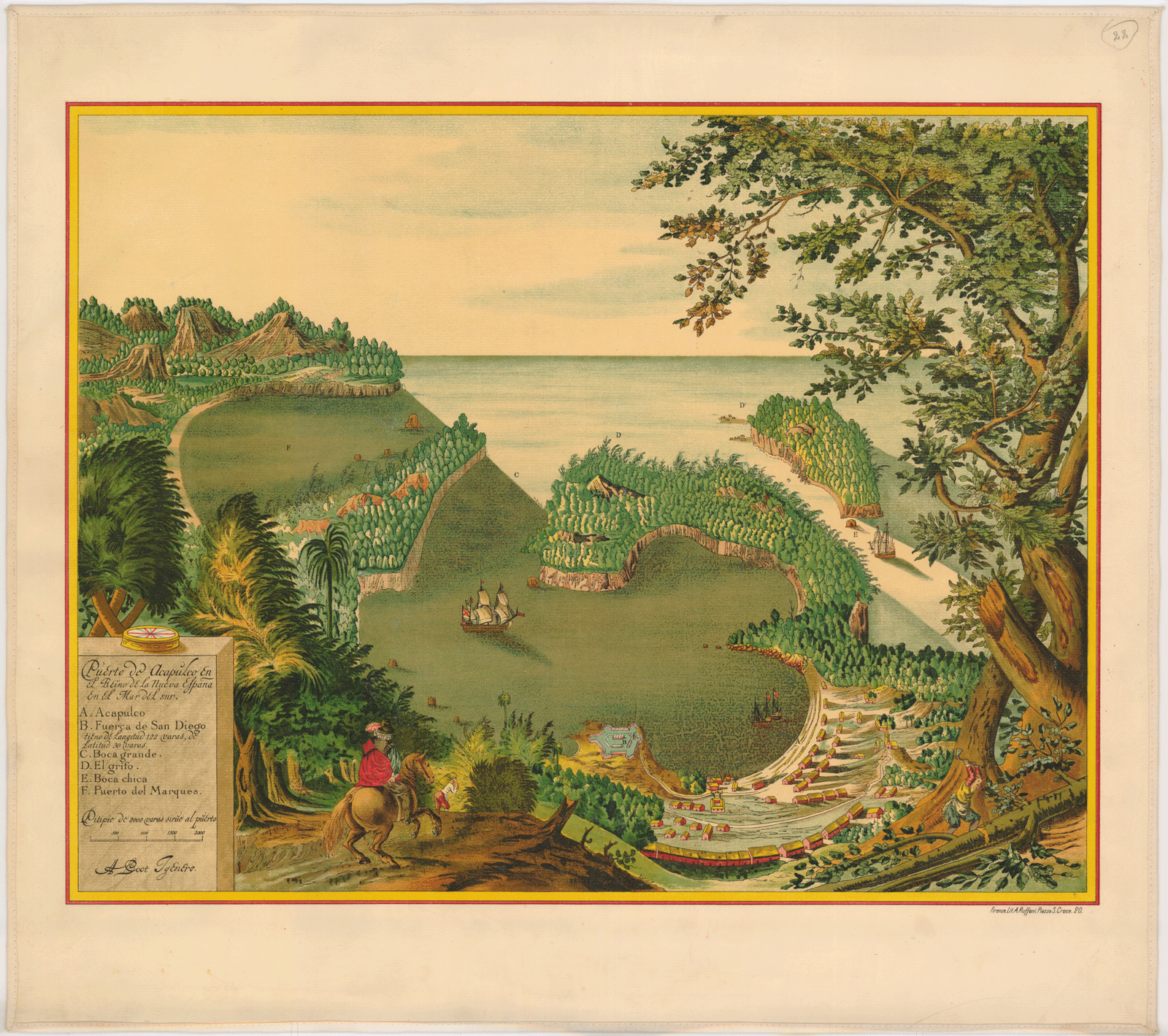
Acapulco in 1628, Mexican terminus of the Manila galleon

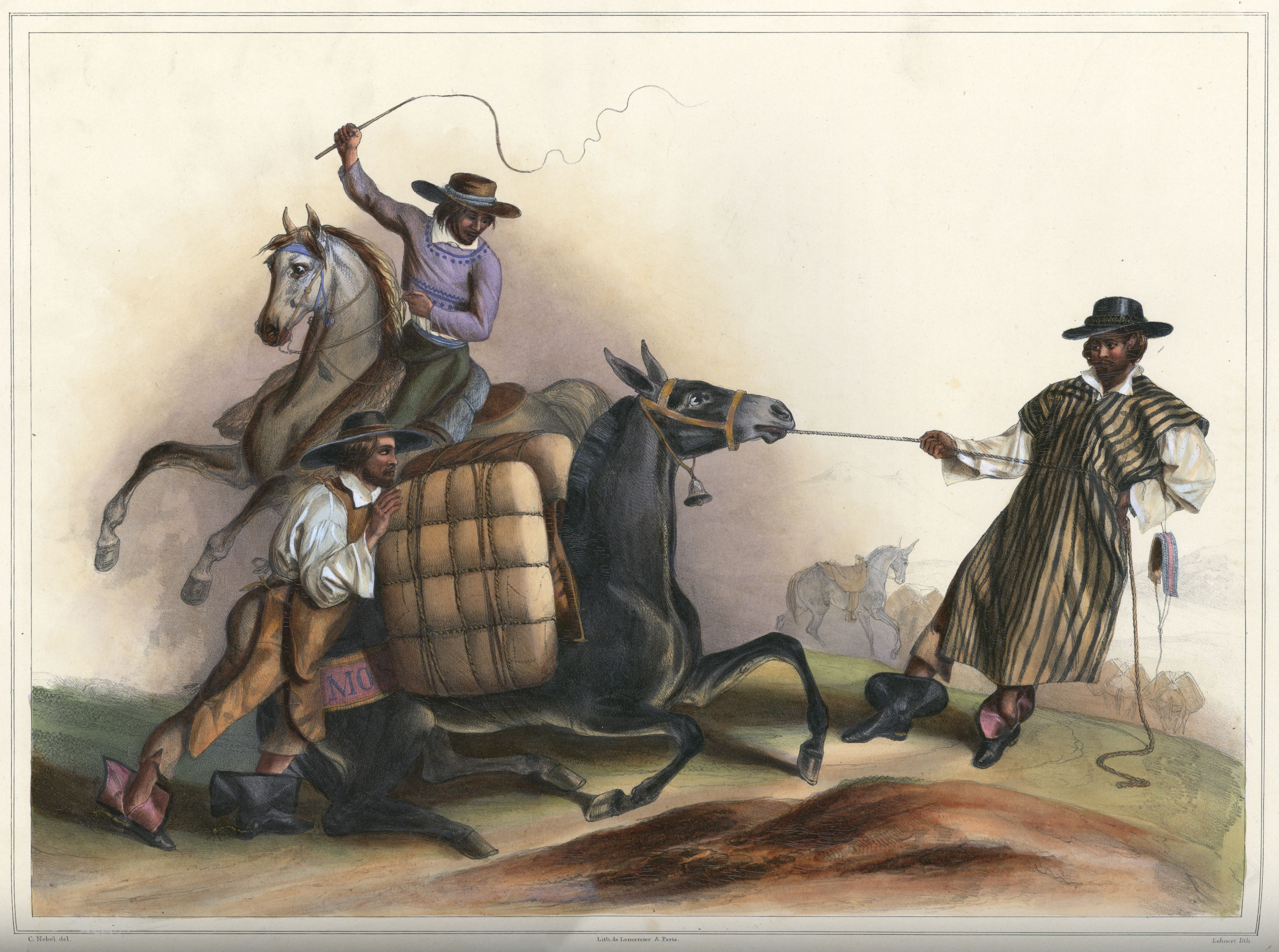
Arrieros in Mexico. Mules were the main way cargo was moved overland, engraving by Carl Nebel

Crown policy attempted to control overseas trade, setting up the Casa de Contratación in 1503 to register cargoes including immigration to the overseas empire. From Spain, sailings to the major ports in Spanish America left from Seville. It was a distance up from the mouth of the Guadalquivir river, and its channel did not allow the largest transoceanic ships to dock there when fully loaded.

The Carrera de Indias was the main route of Spain's Atlantic trade, originating in Seville and sailing to a few Spanish American ports in the Caribbean, particularly Santo Domingo, Veracruz, on the Atlantic coast of Panama, Nombre de Dios later Porto Bello. Since trade and commerce were so integral to the rise of Spain's power, historians undertook studies of the policies and patterns. J.H. Parry's classic The Spanish Seaborne Empire remains important for its clear explication of transatlantic trade, including ports, ships and ship building, and there is new work on Spanish politics and trade with information on the fleets.

Transatlantic trading companies based in Spain and with partners, usually other family members, established businesses to ship a variety of goods, sourced in Spain and elsewhere in Europe and shipped to the major ports of the overseas empire. The most important export from the New World was silver, which became essential for financing the Spanish crown and as other European powers became emboldened, the ships were targeted for their cargo. The system of convoys or fleets (Spanish: flota) was established early on, with ships from Veracruz and from South America meeting in the Caribbean for a combined sailing to Spain. Transpacific trade with the Spanish archipelago of the Philippines was established, with Asian goods shipped from Manila to the port of Acapulco. The Manila galleon brought silks, porcelains, and slaves to Mexico while Spanish silver was sent to Asia. The transpacific trade has been long neglected in comparison to the transatlantic trade and the rise of Atlantic history. New works indicate that interest is increasing. Although the crown attempted to maintain a closed trading system within the Spanish Empire, the British traded with Spanish Americans, accelerating in the eighteenth century.

Overland transportation of goods in Spanish America was generally by pack animals, especially mules, and in the Andean area llamas as well. But the Spanish did not build many roads allowing cart or carriage transport. Transit over oceans or coastal sailing was relatively efficient compared to land transportation, and in most places in Spanish America there were few navigable rivers and no possibility of canal construction. Transportation costs and inefficiency were drags on economic development; the problem was not overcome until railroads were constructed in the late nineteenth century. For bulky, low value foodstuffs, local supply was a necessity, which stimulated regional development of landed estates, particularly near mines. Despite the inefficiencies overland trade, hubs of trade had main routes develop between them, with smaller communities linked by secondary or tertiary roads. The ability to move silver from remote mining regions to ports was a priority, and the supplies to mines of mercury was essential.

=== Environmental impacts ===
The environmental impact of economic activity has coalesced as a field in the late twentieth century, in particular Alfred Crosby's work on the Columbian Exchange and "ecological imperialism." A general history of the environment is by Shawn William Miller. An important general ecological history of central Mexico for the eighteenth century is by Arij Ouweneel. Also important for environmental history is Elinor G.K. Melville's work on sheep grazing and ecological change in Mexico. For the Andean region, the ecological and human costs of mercury mining, essential to silver production, have recently been studied.

== End of the colonial era ==
Independence in Spanish America occupies an ambiguous place in historiography, since it marks both the end of crown rule and the emergence of sovereign nations. The historiography of Spanish American independence has not had a unifying narrative, and has been generally linked to nation-centric accounts. The 2017 publication of Brian Hamnett's The End of Iberian Rule and the American Continent, 1770–1830 aims to show how independence came about in both Spanish America and Brazil, focusing on the contingency of that outcome. He is one of many historians who have argued that political independence was by no means inevitable. "There was little interest in outright independence." Since independence did come about, explanations of why that occurred have been sought in the colonial era. The French capture of the Bourbon monarch Charles IV and his forced abdication in 1808 opened an era of political instability in Spain and Spanish America. Timothy Anna and Michael Costeloe have argued that the Bourbon monarchy collapsed, bringing into being new, sovereign nations, when American-born elites mainly sought autonomy within the existing system. Political scientist Jorge I. Domínguez writes in the same vein about the "breakdown of the Spanish American empire," arguing that independence was caused by international rivalries and not a splintering of colonial elites, whose conflicts he says could be managed within the existing framework. Hamnett's fifty-year frame of reference allows him to show the Spanish crown's attempts reform, but with the Napoleonic invasion of Spain, the Liberal constitution of 1812, and the repudiation of reform with Ferdinand VII's restoration in 1814 pushed Spanish American elites to outright declarations of independence. The inflexibility of both the Spanish liberals and the absolutist Ferdinand VII lost Spain its continental Spanish American empire. Spain itself entered a new era at the same time that Spanish American sovereign states were working out their new political reality.

There are a number of standard works on independence, some of which have been revised in subsequent editions. Richard Graham's Independence in Latin America remains a succinct examination. A classic work on the era is John Lynch's The Spanish American Revolutions, 1808–1826, followed by many others on leaders ("liberators") as well as the era generally. A number of histories of colonial Spanish America take the 1808 Napoleonic invasion of Iberia and ouster of the Bourbon monarchy as their end date. General histories of colonial Latin America end with one or more chapters on independence. The Cambridge History of Latin America has its first two volumes devoted to the colonial period generally, while volume 3 is devoted to the transition from independence to individual sovereign nations and the subsequent political chaos, and economic instability in Spanish America. Brazil largely escaped these problems with the decamping of the Portuguese monarchy to Brazil during the Napoleonic wars and the establishment of an independent Brazilian monarchy by a member of the Braganza dynasty in 1822.

== See also ==
- Spanish Empire
- Spanish American Enlightenment
- Bourbon Reforms
- New Spain
- History of Mexico
- Economic history of Mexico
- Creole nationalism
- History of Roman Catholicism in Mexico
- New Philology
- Latin American studies
