= Historical revision of the Inquisition =

The historical revision of the Inquisition is a historiographical process that started to emerge in the 1970s, with the opening of formerly closed archives, the development of new historical methodologies, and, in Spain, the death of the ruling dictator Francisco Franco in 1975. New works of historical revisionism changed our knowledge of the history of the Roman and Spanish Inquisitions.

Writers associated with this project share the view of Edward Peters, a prominent historian in the field, who states: "The Inquisition was an image assembled from a body of legends and myths which, between the sixteenth and the twentieth centuries, established the perceived character of inquisitorial tribunals and influenced all ensuing efforts to recover their historical reality."

== Background ==
Inquisitions were ecclesiastical investigations conducted either directly by the Catholic Church or by secular authorities with the support of the Church. These investigations were undertaken at varying times in varying regions under the authority of the local bishop and his designates or under the sponsorship of papal-appointed legates. The purpose of each inquisition was specific to the outstanding circumstances of the region in which it was held. Investigations usually involved a legal process, the goal of which was to obtain a confession and reconciliation with the Church from those who were accused of heresy or of participating in activities contrary to Church Canon law. The objectives of the inquisitions were to secure the repentance of the accused and to maintain the authority of the Church. Inquisitions were conducted with the collaboration of secular authorities. If an investigation resulted in a person being convicted of heresy and unwillingness to repent, punishment was administered by the secular authorities.

"Until recently, Protestant-inspired literature on the Inquisition tended to be hostile to the Catholic Church per se, while Catholic literature tended to be narrowly apologetic and justificatory." For Protestant scholars of the nineteenth century such as William H. Prescott and John Lothrop Motley the Spanish Inquisition represented "the archsymbol of religious intolerance and ecclesiastical power". Henry Charles Lea wrote both A History of the Inquisition of the Middle Ages (1888) and A History of the Inquisition of Spain (1906). A History of the Inquisition of Spain was considered both groundbreaking and polemical. His studies were criticized for having both an anti-Catholic and an anti-Spanish bias. Lea saw the Inquisition as theocratic absolutism that weakened Spain to an extent that undermined its overseas empire and ultimately contributed to its defeat during the Spanish–American War of 1898.

For a long time, the Spanish Inquisition had been associated principally with persecution of Protestants. Nineteenth-century historian José Amador de los Ríos brought a focus to bear on the situation of Spain's large converso population.

== More recent studies ==
The two most significant and extensively-cited sources of this revised analysis of the historiography of the inquisitorial proceedings are Inquisition (1988) by Edward Peters and The Spanish Inquisition: An Historical Revision (1997) by Henry Kamen. These works focus on identifying and correcting what they argue are popular modern misconceptions about the inquisitions and historical misinterpretations of their activities. Kamen's 1997 book is updated and revised from an edition first published in 1965. Kamen takes the position that the Inquisition in Spain was motivated more by political considerations than religious, that the monarchs routinely protected those close to the crown, and that in Aragon large areas either defied or hindered its operation. Eric Rust of Baylor University describes Kamen's work as "historical revision at its best".

Helen Rawlings credits Kamen with launching a movement to revisit the historical record. Rawlings identifies four distinct phases, as over time the Inquisition in Spain adapted to changing conditions. From 1480 to 1525 there was an intense persecution of conversos suspected of continuing to practice Judaism. From 1525 to 1630 there was an increased concern of possible Protestant influence on "Old Christians". A less active period from 1630 to 1725 periodically looked to Portuguese "New Christians" operating in Spanish commercial sectors; and from 1725 to 1824 traditionalists and liberals argued the future of the institution.

== The Inquisitions in France ==
=== The "Grand Program" ===
During the 11th century, a new wave of religiosity swept through Europe. It claimed that the prospect of salvation in the world would greatly increase if the world were reformed. In addition, the papacy itself underwent reform at the end of the 11th century and, according to Peters, the Church began devising its "grand program of sanctifying the world". The "grand program" was a combination of the Church's desire to reform its institutional life, free itself from secular control, and build a Christian society. There was also a growing opinion that those who rebelled from the church's beliefs (heretics) or behaved in a manner that was "un-Christian" were not simply souls led astray in a "temptation-filled world, but [were] subverters of the world's new course".

Until the late 12th century, the investigation of heresy was considered the responsibility of local churches, and it was held that local secular authorities would prosecute heretics. However, in 1179, the Church's "grand program of sanctifying the world" saw the creation of the Third Lateran Council, which included a canon condemning heretics. In 1184, Pope Lucius III issued the Ad abolendam, labeled "the founding charter of the inquisition". It called for those found as heretics by the local church to be turned over to secular courts. Finally, in 1199, Pope Innocent III equated heresy with treason and, in 1208, called for a "crusade" against the Albigensians

=== Albigensian Crusade ===
According to Peters, the violence of the following "Albigensian Crusade" was not in line with the reforms and plans of Innocent, who stressed confession, reform of the clergy and laity and pastoral teachings to oppose heresy. Peters asserts that the violence was caused by the "crusade" being under the control of mobs, petty rulers and local bishops who did not uphold Innocent's ideas. Armies from northern France swept through the south and essentially eradicated the Albigensians. The uncontainable, prejudicial passion of local mobs and heresy hunters, the violence of secular courts and the bloodshed of the Albigensian crusade sparked a desire within the papacy to implement greater control over the prosecution of heresy. The desire led to the development of organised legal procedures for dealing with heretics.

Protestant reformers in the 16th century often pointed to the Cathar and Waldensian movements as part of an underground reformed Church that had been the victim of persecution for centuries even though the Cathars had an unquestionably non-Reformed, dualistic perception of God.

=== Codes and torture ===
Generally, inquisitorial courts functioned much like the secular courts of the time, but their sentences and penances were less cruel. A number of procedures and protections restricted the torture of the accused, but much torture could be inflicted, and capital punishment was executed by secular authorities because of the clerical prohibition on shedding blood. Torture was used to extract confession, rather than as a form of punishment, as used by secular courts. Any confession made following or during torture had to be freely repeated the next day without torture, or it was considered invalid. "Technically, therefore, torture was strictly a means of obtaining the only full proof available.... [The inquisitors'] tasks were not only – or even primarily – to convict the contumacious heretic, but... to preserve the unity of the Church".

After the suppression of the Albigensian heresy in southern France in the 13th century, inquisitorial trials diminished in the face of more pressing local needs, and any lingering trials were left to secular authorities. Inquisitorial courts conducted under local episcopacies worked closely with local secular authorities and dealt with local circumstances. Regional control of the inquisitorial process and regional concerns became dominant. By the mid-to-late 14th century papal-commissioned inquisitions had been dissolved in many parts of Europe.

== The Inquisitions in Spain ==
=== Antisemitism and the "conversos" ===
Peters writes,

"From the mid fifteenth century on, religious anti-Semitism changed into ethnic anti-Semitism, with little difference seen between Jews and conversos except for the fact that conversos were regarded as worse than Jews because, as ostensible Christians, they had acquired privileges and positions that were denied to Jews. The result of this new ethnic anti-Semitism was the invocation of an inquisition to ferret out the false conversos who had, by becoming formal Christians, placed themselves under its authority". It was a heated mixture of this racial and religious prejudice against the conversos that ignited what later became known as the "Spanish Inquisition."

The main heresy prosecuted during the period of inquisitions in Spain was the secret practice of Judaism among some conversos. (The number of conversos secretly practicing elements of Judaism is unknown, but recent scholarship has tended to document the existence of more of them, and at later dates, than previously assumed.) From the establishment of the inquisitions up to 1530, it is estimated that approximately 2,000 "heretics" were turned over to the secular authorities for execution in Spain.

There were so few Protestants in Spain that widespread persecution of Protestantism was not physically possible. In the 1560s, a little over one hundred people in Spain were convicted of Protestantism and were turned over to the secular authorities for execution. From 1560 to 1599, two hundred more people were accused of being followers of Martin Luther. "Most of them were in no sense Protestants...Irreligious sentiments, drunken mockery, anticlerical expressions, were all captiously classified by the inquisitors (or by those who denounced the cases) as 'Lutheran'".

=== Procedure and torture ===
Evidence and witness testimony was gathered before an arrest was made. Once an arrest was made, the accused was given several opportunities to admit to any heretical behavior before the charges against him/her were identified. If the accused did not admit to any wrongdoing, the inquisitors dictated the charges and the accused was required to respond to them immediately. Torture was used, but only for extracting confessions during a trial and was not used as punishment after sentencing. If torture was used, the accused was required to repeat their repentance without torture. The Inquisition also had a rule that they were allowed to use torture only once, however, they were able to 'suspend' sessions and resume them the following day, but never led into a third day.

As in the French inquisitions, the purpose of Spanish inquisitorial torture was to gain information or confession, not to punish. It was used in a relatively small percentage of trials since of course the threat of torture if no confession was given was often enough to induce one, and torture was usually a last resort. The "scenes of sadism conjured up by popular writers on the inquisition have little basis in reality, though the whole procedure was unpleasant enough [even] to arouse periodic protests from Spaniards".

The modern historian Thomas F. Madden has suggested that the Inquisition "was an attempt to stop unjust executions" and "the Spanish Inquisition was widely hailed as the best run, most humane court in Europe".

=== The auto de fe ===
The auto de fe that followed trials is the most infamous part of the inquisitions in Spain. The auto de fe involved prayer, celebration of Mass, a public procession of those found guilty, and a reading of their sentences. Artistic representations of the auto de fe usually depict torture and the burning at the stake. These paintings became a major source for creating the violent image popularly associated with the Spanish inquisitions. However, this type of activity never took place during an auto de fe, which was in essence a religious act. Torture was not administered after a trial concluded and executions were always held after and separate from the auto de fe. Because the autos de fe officially separate torture and execution, all these events should be considered separate. Although some torture (routine throughout the continent at the time) may have been caused indirectly by the church, the church did not hold itself officially responsible for the murders committed during the inquisition.

Between 1550 and 1800, the inquisitions in Spain focused not only Protestants, but also on the conversos, the supervision of their own clergy, the general problem of non-mainstream religious beliefs among Catholics, and "blasphemous" or "scandalous" behavior. Some believe that the Spanish inquisitions may not have been exceptionally different from other European courts of the time in their prosecution of these offences, as many of these charges were viewed as part of a broad class of moral crimes that raised legitimate concern to spiritual and secular courts in an age when many regarded religion as the fundamental foundation of society.

== The Inquisitions in Italy ==
=== Context ===
Increasing trends in regionalism, the criticism of ecclesiastic abuses, the Avignon Papacy, and the Great Schism all contributed to the emergence of new religious dissent and unrest in 14th and 15th century Italy. Furthermore, widespread ecclesiastical and clerical reform advanced through the last decades of the 15th century, and by the second decade of the 16th century, reform movements prevailed in many parts of Europe.

The protests raised by Martin Luther that began in 1517 did not initially receive much attention from the papacy. Luther and his supporters concreted the principles of the Protestant Reformation during the 1520s, sparking the development of many reform movements in various regions of Italy. By the time of the pontificate of Paul III, the Reform movement had swept much of Europe away from the Catholic Church. In response, Paul III issued the Licet ab initio, establishing inquisitions in Rome in 1542. These inquisitions consisted of six cardinals given the authority to investigate heresy and to appoint deputies when they deemed necessary.

=== The creation of the Holy Office ===
Although the Roman inquisitions worked moderately and guardedly during the remainder of the pontificate of Paul III, they became an essential part of the structure of Rome when Paul IV, who became pope in 1555, launched the Counter-Reformation that Paul III began. Later, in 1588, Pope Sixtus V officially organized the inquisitions into the Congregation of the Holy Roman and Universal Inquisition or Holy Office. This was only one of fifteen administrative departments of the papal government and was not the sole operating body of the Church.

=== "Heresies" of the Italian Inquisitions ===
Even though the inquisitions in Spain prosecuted a small quantity of Reformers, the Roman inquisitions were the first to target intentionally and specifically the "heresy" of Protestantism. These inquisitions and their subordinate tribunals were generally successful in keeping any substantial Protestant influence from spreading throughout Italy. Protestants in the decades and centuries to come would use this relatively short-lived persecution as the basis for their accusations about the awful "Inquisition." Protestant movements were reduced by around 1600, so for the duration of the 17th century the Roman inquisitions turned their focus to offences other than Protestantism, notably "magical" heresy.

In many trials involving "witchcraft" or "sorcery," "the inquisitors understood very well that the lack of catechesis or consistent pastoral guidance could often result in misunderstandings of doctrine and liturgy, and they showed tolerance of all but the most unavoidably serious circumstances. Thus, although both the Spanish and Roman inquisitions prosecuted the offenses of witchcraft and sorcery very early and vigorously, they also were the first courts to be skeptical of the evidence and mechanism of witchcraft accusations, and they consistently offered the most lenient treatment to marginal cases".

Italian historian Andrea Del Col estimates that out of 62,000 cases judged by Inquisition in Italy after 1542 only 2% (ca. 1250) ended with death sentence.

=== Evolution of the Holy Office ===
By the turn of the 18th century, the Congregation of the Holy Office had virtually no power or influence outside the Papal States. Its main function shifted yet again to the investigation of clerical immorality and corruption and to the censoring of printed books, the latter of which was the key responsibility of the Congregation of the Index. By 1860, the restrictions placed upon ecclesiastical authority and the emerging national Italian state only further reduced the activities of the Holy Office. With its powers reduced to the weakened Papal State, the Office became an advisory committee to the late 19th century popes, where it played a far greater advisory than executive role.

In 1965 Pope Paul VI changed the Office's name to The Sacred Congregation for the Doctrine of Faith and abolished the Congregation of the Index entirely in 1966. Since then, the Congregation for the Doctrine of the Faith has functioned as a papal advisor on theological matters and on matters of ecclesiastical discipline. "Although its work is regular, the Congregation can now hardly be thought of as an Inquisition".

== The Creation of "The Inquisition" ==
The modern day notion of a unified and horrible "Inquisition" is an assemblage of the "body of legends and myths which, between the sixteenth and the twentieth centuries, established the perceived character of inquisitorial tribunals and influenced all ensuing efforts to recover their historical reality". "The [assembled] myth was originally devised to serve variously the political purposes of a number of early modern political regimes, as well as Protestant Reformers, proponents of religious and civil toleration, philosophical enemies of the civil power of organized religions, and progressive modernists..." It was the relatively limited persecution of Protestants, mostly by the inquisitions in Spain and Italy, that provoked the first image of "The Inquisition" as the most violent and suppressive vehicle of the Church against Protestantism. Later, philosophical critics of religious persecution and the Catholic Church only furthered this image during the Enlightenment.

=== Catholic opposition to the Spanish Inquisition ===
"...an early major source of anti-Inquisition propaganda happened to be Catholic in origin. With the outstanding exception of the Holy Roman Empire, every significant Catholic state in Europe, including France, was at some time hostile to Spain." Contemporary political scientist Niccolò Machiavelli (in The Prince) suggested that King Ferdinand of Spain (who originated the Spanish Inquisition) used religion to his political and financial advantage. Italians under Spanish rule repeatedly revolted against the imposition of a Spanish Inquisition (such as revolts in Naples in 1547). Unpaid Spanish and Germanic mercenaries of the King of Spain (Charles V, Holy Roman Emperor) sacked Rome ten years after Luther posted his theses, besieging the Pope and ending Rome's pre-eminence in the Renaissance. Italian diplomats expressed a low opinion of the Spanish and their Inquisition. Internal criticism of Spanish policies in the Americas was cited by foes of the Inquisition.

=== "A Protestant Vision..." ===
"When the printing press first began to form public opinion ... the most diligent victims of the Inquisition happened to be supporters of the Reformation, and they set about convincing Europe that Spain's intentions ... were now directed against Christian truth and liberty." The Inquisition was characterized by clerical organization and support of the inquisitions in Spain and Italy, their "united" success in suppressing Protestant doctrines, and the fear of The Inquisition being initiated elsewhere. "Propaganda along these lines proved to be strikingly effective in the context of the political conflicts of the time, and there were always refugees from persecution to lend substance to the story." "As a Protestant vision of Christian history took shape in the 16th century, the contemporary inquisitions were identified with the inquisitorial tribunals of the medieval past, and the Protestant Reformers with earlier victims of The Inquisition". Catholic defenders of the inquisitorial process used the same argument – that the Reformers were no different from medieval heretics and should be prosecuted in the same manner – thus perpetuating the idea of a continuous, masterminded Inquisition. Both sides made emotional appeals; "Thus alongside various kinds of theological and personal polemic, a war of martyrologies commenced."

=== The Revolt of the Netherlands ===
The Netherlands and Spain came to share rulers by marriage and inheritance among royal families. The Dutch chafed under the shared monarchy; their many states wanted to retain traditional autonomy while the crown sought centralized authority. The animosity between the King and the Netherlands had complex origins – political, economic, cultural, religious and personal.

By around 1550, the Dutch "printing press and propaganda turned to the service of political reform, with The Inquisition as a major focus, on...a wide scale and with...devastating effects". (Note: Losing a battle of the press was not inevitable. By 1487 many presses operated in Spain and tax policies favored printers, foreign and domestic. Queen Isabel was fond of literature, music and paintings.) Even though the Dutch organized their own state-run inquisitions, it was feared that King Philip II would implement a new "Spanish Inquisition" in the Netherlands to eliminate Protestantism. Popular literature, circulating pamphlets, and other images painted the picture of a widespread, awful "Spanish Inquisition." A decree of the Spanish Inquisition signed by the King of Spain in 1568 declared most Dutch lives and property forfeit. The decree was not determined to be a forgery until the 20th century. Such anti-inquisition propaganda motivated all citizens.

Eventually, "The Inquisition" became viewed as the primary instrument of Catholic tyranny, not only of Protestants, but also of freedom of thought and religion in general. However, exporting the Inquisition to the Netherlands was never in the plans of the Spanish Habsburg rulers, at least after the time of Charles V.

=== Montanus ===
In 1567 A Discovery and Plaine Declaration of Sundry Subtill Practices of the Holy Inquisition of Spain was published under the pseudonym Reginaldus Gonzalvus Montanus. While authorship is disputed, it was probably written by Antonio del Corro and/or Casiodoro de Reina, both previously Spanish Catholic monks who became Protestants and fled the Inquisition. The former was a theologian, close relative of an inquisitor and ferocious enemy of the Spanish Inquisition in its campaign to destroy Protestantism. The latter was a student of the Bible from childhood, later translating the Bible into Spanish. Montanus' text was "brief, intelligently designed, and written in a lively and engaging style." It was simultaneously accurate about Inquisitional practices (perhaps published for the first time) and misleading. "Taking some of the most extreme of Inquisitional practices as the norm, Montanus portray[ed] every victim of the Inquisition as innocent, every Inquisition official as venal and deceitful, [and] every step in its procedure as a violation of natural and rational law". The text included 12 case histories of Lutheran martyrs of the Inquisition which were widely read into the early 19th century. The document, along with a number of successive publications, was reprinted and translated throughout Europe and became the definitive source on The Inquisition for many years; "histories" about The Inquisition written after 1567 relied on Montanus as their main source. The Spanish Inquisition, regarding its procedures as secret, never disputed Montanus. In a public relations war of the press the Spanish Inquisition forfeited.

For reasons of history England and France were particularly receptive to Montanus. English monarchs alternated between persecuting Catholics and persecuting Protestants. The French could not agree on a jurisdiction; parlementary and royal inquisitions had both failed.

A more balanced history awaited the publication of Philipp van Limborch in 1692. Juan Antonio Llorente later published a more detailed, if exaggerated, history through his access to the archives of the Spanish Inquisition.

=== William of Orange ===
Also cited as one of the most famous documents supporting the myth of "The Inquisition" is the Apologie of William of Orange, published in 1581. Written by the French Huguenot Pierre Loyseleur de Villiers, the Apologie presented a horrifying narrative of the Spanish Inquisition. This document preserved and reinforced all of the anti-"Inquisition" propaganda generated at the beginning and throughout the Dutch revolt.

William of Orange had been a personal friend of his King from childhood. Nonetheless he became the leader of the Dutch revolt. The King put a price on his head, leading to his assassination. de Villiers had been William's chaplain. The Apologie was William of Orange's rebuttal of the charges made against him (and thus against the revolt). The assassination and rebuttal made William of Orange a martyr, unifying the opposition in a very long war which ultimately led to the formation of Belgium and the Dutch Republic as separate countries.

=== The Black Legend ===
During this time, England, under the rule of the Protestant Queen Elizabeth I and threatened with military attacks from Spain, found a new surge of nationalism being fueled by anti-Catholic propaganda centered on a series of books and pamphlets that detailed the horror of the "Spanish Inquisition". Peters writes, "An image of Spain circulated through late 16th-century Europe, borne by means of political and religious propaganda that blackened the characters of Spaniards and their ruler to such an extent that Spain became the symbol of all forces of repression, brutality, religious and political intolerance, and intellectual and artistic backwardness for the next four centuries. Spaniards ... have termed this process and the image that resulted from it as 'The Black Legend', "la leyenda negra".

Henry Kamen has criticized the concept, "Persistent employment of the [Black Legend] label for ideological ends in order to rebut any criticism of Spain's imperial record has made it both unsuitable to use and inaccurate. In any case many of Spain's actions ... were all too real and no "legend"." "At all times, imperial nations tend to suffer ... in the arena of public opinion, and Spain was no exception, becoming the first victim of a long tradition of polemic that picked on the Inquisition as the most salient point of attack."

=== The Enlightenment and Art ===
By the 17th century, "The Inquisition" provided political and philosophical thinkers with an ideal symbol of religious intolerance. These philosophers and politicians passionately denounced "The Inquisition," citing it as the cause for all the political and economic failures in countries where "Inquisitions" were held. From these debates on toleration, "The Inquisition" was presented by French philosophes as the worst of any religious evil to ever come out of Europe.Additionally, writers, artists, and sculptors of the 17th and 18th centuries used "The Inquisition" as one of their main inspirations, retaliating against "The Inquisition's" suppression of creativity, literature, and art. These artistic images have arguably become some of the most long-lasting and effective perpetuators of "The Inquisition" myth. (Note: "Incredible as it may seem, in the age of the printing press not a single authentic Spanish image of the Holy Office saw the light of day. In the battle of images, the Inquisition was a clear loser." Images of the Spanish Inquisition by Pedro Berruguete, Francisco Goya, Philipp van Limborch, Bernard Picart (and perhaps Francisco Rizi?) may be historically inaccurate.)

== See also ==
- Inquisition
  - Medieval Inquisition
  - Mexican Inquisition
  - Peruvian Inquisition
  - Portuguese Inquisition
  - Roman Inquisition
  - Spanish Inquisition
- Congregation for the Doctrine of the Faith
- Execution by burning
- Historical revisionism
- History of the Jews in Spain
- Histoire de l'Inquisition en France
- Francisco Jiménez de Cisneros
- White legend

== Sources and Further reading ==
- Catholic Dossier, special issue on "The Inquisition", vol. 2, no. 6 (Nov–Dec 1996).
- Carroll, Anne W. "The Inquisition", in Christ the King: Lord of History, pp. 207–211. Rockford Illinois: Tan Books and Publishers, 1994.
- Duke, Alastair (2004). "The elusive Netherlands. The question of national identity in the early modern Low Countries on the eve of the Revolt". BMGN: Low Countries Historical Review. 119 (1): 10–38. doi:10.18352/bmgn-lchr.5967.
- Horvat, Marian (March 1998). "The Holy Inquisition: Myth or Reality". Catholic Family News..
- Kamen, Henry (1997). The Spanish Inquisition: A Historical Revision. London: Weidenfeld & Nicolson..
- Kamen, Henry (2014). The Spanish Inquisition : A Historical Revision. New Haven: Yale University Press. ISBN 978-0-300-18051-0.
- Kelly, Henry A. "Inquisition and the Prosecution of Heresy: Misconceptions and Abuses." Church History, vol. 58, no. 4 (Dec 1989): 439–451.
- Madden, Thomas F. "The Real Inquisition: Investigating the Popular Myth", National Review Online, 18 June 2004.
- Parker, Geoffrey. "Some Recent Work on the Inquisition in Spain and Italy." The Journal of Modern History, vol. 54, no. 3 (Sept 1982): 519–532.
- Peters, Edward (1988). Inquisition. New York London: Free Press Collier Macmillan. ISBN 9780029249802.
- Peters, Edward (1989). Inquisition. Berkeley: University of California Press. ISBN 978-0520066304.
- Reston, James (2006). Dogs of God : Columbus, the Inquisition, and the defeat of the Moors. New York: Anchor Books. ISBN 978-1-4000-3191-7.
- Sanchez, M. G. Anti-Spanish Sentiment in English Literary and Political Writing. PhD Diss, University of Leeds, 2004.
- Van Hove, Brian. "Beyond the Myth of The Inquisition: Ours is 'The Golden Age'." Faith and Reason, (Winter, 1992).
