= White Legend =

Uncritical view of Spanish colonialism

The White Legend (Spanish: Leyenda blanca), or Rosy Legend (Leyenda rosa), is a label that is used to describe a historiographic approach that presents an uncritical or idealized image of Spanish colonialism. Some authors consider it to be the result of taking excessive attempts to counter the bias of the Black Legend, and others consider it to have developed independently. Miguel Molina Martinez describes the White Legend legend as a characteristic of the Spanish nationalist historiography, which was propagated during the regime of Francisco Franco, which associated itself with the imperial past and couched it in positive terms. Molina Martinez points to the classic text of Spanish Americanists during the Franco period, Rómulo Carbia's Historia de la leyenda negra hispanoamericana, as a work with a strong ideological motivation and frequently fell into arguments that could be qualified as part of the White Legend and also gives more current examples of the trope.

Some, such as Benjamin Keen, have criticized the works of John Fiske and Lewis Hanke as going too far towards idealizing Spanish history. While recognizing the general merit of Hanke's work, Keen suggests that the contemporary imperial ventures by the United States in the Caribbean and the Philippines had led him to idealize the Spanish Empire as an analogy for American colonialism. Keen, Sergio Villalobos and others argues that the proponents of the White Legend focus on Spanish legal codes protecting the Indigenous population but ignore the copious documentary evidence that they were widely ignored. For example, Villalobos and orhers posit that the encomienda was largely a bad deal for Indigenous peoples and was marred with abuses. They criticize attempts by historians like Jaime Eyzaguirre to find anecdotes of good treatment towards the Indigenous.

Another trope commonly repeated among proponents of the White Legend is that Spanish America was never a colony after the 1951 essay Las Indias no eran colonias of Ricardo Levene. Followers of that view, therefore, avoid the term "colony" (colonia) and prefer "kingdom" (reino) for Spanish entities in the Americas. Reportedly, this view ignores the unequal treatment of Spanish possessions in the Americas toward Metropolitan Spain.

Luis Castellvi Laukamp accuses Elvira Roca Barea of "transforming the Black Legend into the White Legend" in her 2016 book, Imperofobia y Leyenda Negra in which she claims that Spain confronted the other "not with racist theories but with [protective] laws". Castellvi Laukamp points out that the Spanish Laws of the Indies included racism from the beginning but also that slavery continued in Spanish colonies in the Americas until 1886. He further takes issue with claims that Spanish colonies' high level of mestizaje (biological and cultural mixing of the European and Indigenous population) demonstrates the absence of racism in the empire. Castellvi Laukamp quotes from contemporary sources showing that Indigenous women were treated as spoils of war and subject to racialised sexual slavery and subordination and demonstrates the discriminatory racial stereotypes deployed against black and other non-white women in the colonial period.

Spanish historian Esteban Mira Caballos argues, quoting Manuel Moreno Fraginals, that the Black and White Legends form part of a single unity, which he calls a "Great Lie". He goes on to describe the way the Black Legend is instrumentalized to support the White Legend:

The consequence of the positioning of those who allude to the Black Legend in order to, in reality, defend the White Legend, has been to silence any criticism of the past: We were marvellous, and anything negative anyone has to say about us is fruit of the Black Legend. And without the possibility of criticism, the science of History loses all meaning.

— Esteban Mira Caballos, Mito, realidad y actualidad de la leyenda negra

== Other uses ==
The "White Legend" or the "Rosy Legend" may also refer to the propaganda that was circulated within Spain by Philip II and his descendants. It claimed that his actions in the Netherlands and America were religiously motivated so that his own patrimony would be preserved. The propaganda was intended to foster the image that Spain was ruled by a prudent and pious monarch and to control the unrest that was generated by his aggressive policies and his wars in the Netherlands.

== See also ==
- Historical revision of the Inquisition
