= Black Legend =

Alleged anti-Spanish historiography

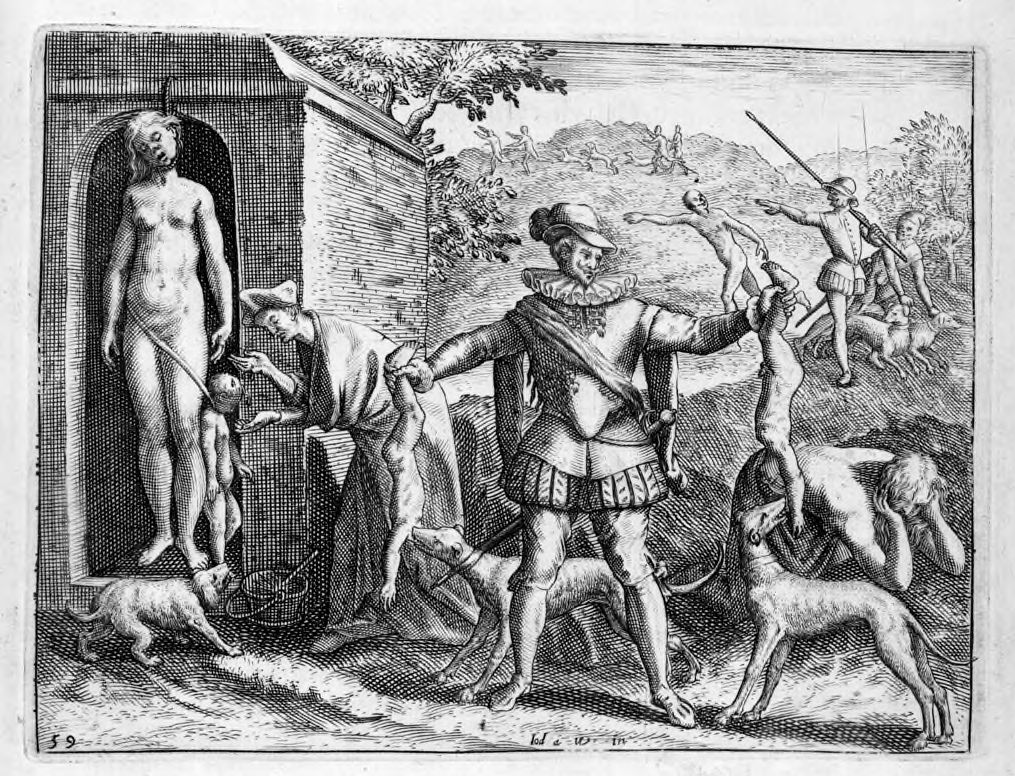
A 1598 Dutch engraving by Theodor de Bry depicting a Spaniard feeding slain Indigenous American women and children to his dogs. De Bry's works are characteristic of anti-Spanish propaganda which resulted from the Eighty Years' War.

The Black Legend (Spanish: leyenda negra) or the Spanish Black Legend (Spanish: leyenda negra española) is a purported historiographical tendency which consists of anti-Spanish and anti-Catholic propaganda. Its proponents argue that its roots date back to the 16th century, when Spain's European rivals were seeking, by political and psychological means, to demonize the Spanish Empire, its people, and its culture, minimize Spanish discoveries and achievements, and counter its influence and power in world affairs.

According to the theory, Protestant propaganda published during the Hispano-Dutch War and the Anglo-Spanish War against the Catholic monarchs of the 16th century fostered an anti-Hispanic bias among subsequent historians. Along with a distorted view of the history of Spain and the history of Latin America, other parts of the world in the Portuguese Empire were also affected as a result of the Iberian Union and the Luso-Dutch Wars. Although some 17th-century propaganda was based in real events from the Spanish colonization of the Americas, some of which involved atrocities, the mainstream academia around the Leyenda Negra suggests that it often employed lurid and exaggerated depictions of violence, and ignored similar behavior by other powers.

Although most scholars agree that the term Black Legend might be useful to describe 17th- and 18th-century anti-Spanish propaganda, there is no consensus on whether the phenomenon persists in the present day. A number of authors have critiqued the use of the "black legend" idea in modern times to present an uncritical image of the Spanish Empire's colonial practices (the so-called "white legend").

== Historiography and definitions of the Spanish Black Legend ==
The term "black legend" was first used by Arthur Lévy in reference to biographies of Napoleon, and he primarily used it in the context of two opposing legends, a "golden legend" and a "black legend": two extreme, simplistic, one-dimensional approaches to a character which portrayed him as a god or a demon. "Golden" and "black legends" had been used by Spanish historians and intellectuals with the same meaning in reference to aspects of Spanish history; Antonio Soler used both terms about the portrayal of Castilian and Aragonese monarchs. The use of the term leyenda negra to refer specifically to a biased, anti-Spanish depiction of history gained currency in the first two decades of the 20th century, and is most associated with Julián Juderías. Throughout the 20th and into the 21st century, scholars have offered divergent interpretations of the Black Legend and debated its usefulness as a historical concept.

=== Origins of the concept of a Spanish Black Legend ===
At an 18 April 1899 Paris conference, Emilia Pardo Bazán used the term "Black Legend" for the first time to refer to a general view of modern Spanish history:

Abroad, our miseries are known and often exaggerated without balance; take as an example the book by M. Yves Guyot, which we can consider as the perfect model of a black legend, the opposite of a golden legend. The Spanish black legend is a strawman for those who seek convenient examples to support certain political theses ... The black legend replaces our contemporary history with a novel in the Ponson du Terrail style, with mines and countermines, which doesn't even deserve the honor of analysis.

The conference had a great impact in Spain, particularly on Julián Juderías. Juderías, who worked at the Spanish Embassy in Russia, had noticed (and denounced) the spread of anti-Russian propaganda in Germany, France, and the United Kingdom and was interested in its possible long-term consequences. Juderías was the first historian to describe the "black legend" phenomenon, although he did not yet name it as such, in a book regarding the construction of an anti-Russian black legend. His work, initially concerned with the intentional deformation of Russia's image in Europe, led him to identify the same patterns of narration he detected in the construction of anti-Russian discourse in the dominant historical narrative regarding Spain. Juderías investigated the original sources supporting centuries old claims of Spanish atrocities and other misdeeds, tracing the origin or propagation of the majority to rival emerging powers. In his 1914 book, La leyenda negra y la verdad histórica (The Black Legend and Historical Truth), deconstructs aspects of Spain's image (including those in Foxe's Book of Martyrs). According to Juderías, this biased historiography was marked by acceptance of propagandistic and politically motivated historical sources and has consistently presented Spanish history in a negative light, purposefully ignoring Spanish achievements and advances. In La leyenda Negra, he defines the Spanish black legend as:

... the environment created by the fantastic stories about our homeland that have seen the light of publicity in all countries, the grotesque descriptions that have always been made of the character of Spaniards as individuals and collectively, the denial or at least the systematic ignorance of all that is favorable and beautiful in the various manifestations of culture and art, the accusations that in every era have been flung against Spain."

=== Historiographic development of the term ===
Later writers supported and developed Juderías's critique. In Tree of Hate (1971), Historian Charles Gibson described it as "the accumulated tradition of propaganda and hispanophobia according to which the Spanish Empire is considered cruel, intolerant, degenerate, exploitative and sanctimonious above reality."

Historian Philip Wayne Powell argued that the Black Legend was still active in modern history, and plays an active role in shaping Latin America–United States relations. His book provides examples of what he viewed as divergent treatment of Spain and other powers, and illustrates how this allows for a double narrative that taints Americans' view of Hispanic America as a whole:

Spaniards who came to the New World seeking opportunities beyond the prospects of their European environment, are contemptuously called cruel and greedy "goldseekers," or other opprobrious epithets virtually synonymous with "Devils"; but Englishmen who sought New World opportunities are more respectfully called "colonists," or "homebuilders," or "seekers after liberty." ... When Spaniards expelled or punished religious dissidents, this came to be known as "bigotry," "intolerance," "fanaticism," and a cause of their decline. When Englishmen, Dutchmen, or Frenchmen did the same thing, it is known as "unifying the nation," or safeguarding it against treason or foreign conspiracy.

— Tree of Hate (2008 edition), page 11

In his book Inquisition, Edward Peters wrote:

An image of Spain circulated through late sixteenth-century Europe, borne by means of political and religious propaganda that blackened the characters of Spaniards and their ruler to such an extent that Spain became the symbol of all forces of repression, brutality, religious and political intolerance, and intellectual and artistic backwardness for the next four centuries. Spaniards and Hispanophiles have termed this process and the image that resulted from it as "The Black Legend," la leyenda negra.

— Inquisition (1989 edition), p.131

In his 2002 book Spain in America: The Origins of Hispanism in the United States, American historian Richard Kagan defined the Spanish black legend:

Compounding this perception of Spain as an inferior 'other' was the Black Legend, the centuries-old cluster of Protestant beliefs that the United States inherited from the British and, to a certain extent, from the Dutch. The Black Legend equated Spain with the Inquisition, religious bigotry, and the bloody persecution of Protestants and Jews. It also conjured up images of despotic monarchs who denied their subjects access to any semblance of economic and political freedom and who had consequently set Spain onto the road of economic weakness and political decline. Such a reading of Spanish history was overly simplistic but promoters of American exceptionalism found it useful to see Spain as an example of what would happen to a country whose fundamental values were antithetical to those of the United States."

According to Julián Marías, the creation of the Spanish black legend was not an exceptional phenomenon -similar disinformation and fabrication campaigns have affected most global powers of the past, such as Ottoman Turkey or Russia- but its persistence and integration into mainstream historiography is. For Marías the causes of its durability are:

1. Overlap of the Spanish Empire with the introduction of the printing press in England and Germany, which enabled the printing of hundreds of pamphlets daily
2. Religious factors and identification
3. Substitution of the Spanish intellectual class by another favorable to its former rival (France) after the War of the Spanish Succession, which established a French narrative in Spain
4. The unique characteristics of the early modern era's colonial wars and the need for new colonial powers to legitimize claims in now-independent Spanish colonies and the unique, new characteristics of the succeeding empire: the British Empire.

Walter Mignolo and Margaret Greer view the Black Legend as a development of Spain's racialisation of Jewishness in the 15th century. The accusations of mixed blood and loose religiosity of the 15th century, first levelled at Jewish and Moorish conversos both inside Spain and abroad, developed into 16th century hispanophobic views of Spaniards as religious fanatics tainted by association with Judaism. The only stable element they see in this hispanophobia is an element of "otherness" marked by interaction with the Eastern and African worlds, of "complete others", cruelty and lack of moral character, in which the same narratives are re-imagined and reshaped.

Antonio Espino López suggests that the prominence of the Black Legend in Spanish historiography has meant that the real atrocities and brutal violence of the Spanish conquest of the Americas have not received the attention they deserve within Spain. He believes that some Hispanicists:

...make an effort to justify the Spanish conquest of the Americas in the best way possible, as they were very conscious of the excesses committed by the "Black Legend", a set of ideas that are characterised by their intellectual coarseness.

According to historian Elvira Roca Barea, the formation of a black legend and its assimilation by a nation is a phenomenon observed in all multicultural empires (not just the Spanish Empire). For Roca Barea, a black legend about an empire is the cumulative result of the propaganda attacks launched by different groups: smaller rivals, allies within its political sphere and defeated rivals, and propaganda created by rival factions inside the imperial system; alongside self-criticism by the intellectual elite, and the needs of new powers consolidated during (or after) the empire's existence.

In response to Roca Barea, José Luis Villacañas states that the "black legend" was primarily a factor related to the geopolitical situation of the 16th and 17th centuries. He argues that:

After 1648 [the Black Legend] was not particularly current in European intellectual circles. To the contrary, [Spain's] old enemies, England and Holland, became the greatest defenders of the Spanish Empire at the end of the 17th century, in order to avoid it falling into the hands of [the French]."

The conceptual validity of a Spanish black legend is widely but not universally accepted by academics. Benjamin Keen expressed doubt about its usefulness as a historical concept, while Ricardo García Cárcel and Lourdes Mateo Bretos denied its existence in their 1991 book, The Black Legend:

It is neither a legend, insofar as the negative opinions of Spain have genuine historical foundations, nor is it black, as the tone was never consistent nor uniform. Gray abounds, but the color of these opinions was always viewed in contrast [to what] we have called the white legend.

== Historical basis ==
Despite having a vast empire stretching from Mexico to Peru across the Pacific to the Philippines and beyond, which required many Spaniards to travel overseas and deal with foreigners, eighteenth-century philosopher Immanuel Kant wrote, "The Spaniard's bad side is that he does not learn from foreigners; that he does not travel in order to get acquainted with other nations; that he is centuries behind in the sciences. He resists any reform; he is proud of not having to work; he is of a romantic quality of spirit, as the bullfight shows; he is cruel, as the former auto-da-fé shows; and he displays in his taste an origin that is partly non-European." Thus, semiotician Walter Mignolo argues that the Spanish black legend was closely tied to race in using Spain's Moorish (Arab and Berber) history to portray Spaniards as racially tainted and its treatment of Native Americans and enslaved sub-Saharan Africans during Spanish colonization to symbolize the country's moral character. That notwithstanding, there is general agreement that the wave of anti-Spanish propaganda of the 16th and 17th centuries was linked to undisputed events and phenomena which occurred at the apogee of Spanish power between 1492 and 1648.

=== Conquest of the Americas ===
During the three-century European colonization of the Americas, atrocities and crimes were committed by all European nations according to both contemporary opinion and modern moral standards. Spain's colonization involved genocide, massacres, murders, slavery, sexual slavery, torture, rape, forced removals, forced religious conversion, cultural genocide and other atrocities, especially in the early years, following the arrival of Christopher Columbus in the Caribbean. However, Spain was the first in recorded history to pass laws for the protection of indigenous peoples. As early as 1512, the Laws of Burgos attempted to regulate the behavior of Europeans in the New World forbidding the ill-treatment of indigenous people and limiting the power of encomenderos—landowners who received royal grants to indigenous communities and their labor. In return, the laws established a regulated regime of work, provisioning, living quarters, hygiene, and care for the natives. The regulation prohibited the use of any form of punishment by the landowners and required that the huts and cabins of the Indians be built together with those of the Spanish. The laws also ordered that the natives be taught the Christian religion and outlawed bigamy.

In July 1513, four more laws were added in what is known as Leyes Complementarias de Valladolid 1513, three related to Indian women and Indian children and another more related to Indian males. In 1542 the New Laws expanded, amended and corrected the previous body of laws in order to ensure their application. These New Laws represented an effort to prevent abuse and de facto enslavement of natives that was not enough to dissuade rebellions by the encomenderos, like that of Gonzalo Pizarro in Perú. However, this body of legislation represents one of the earliest examples of humanitarian laws of modern history.

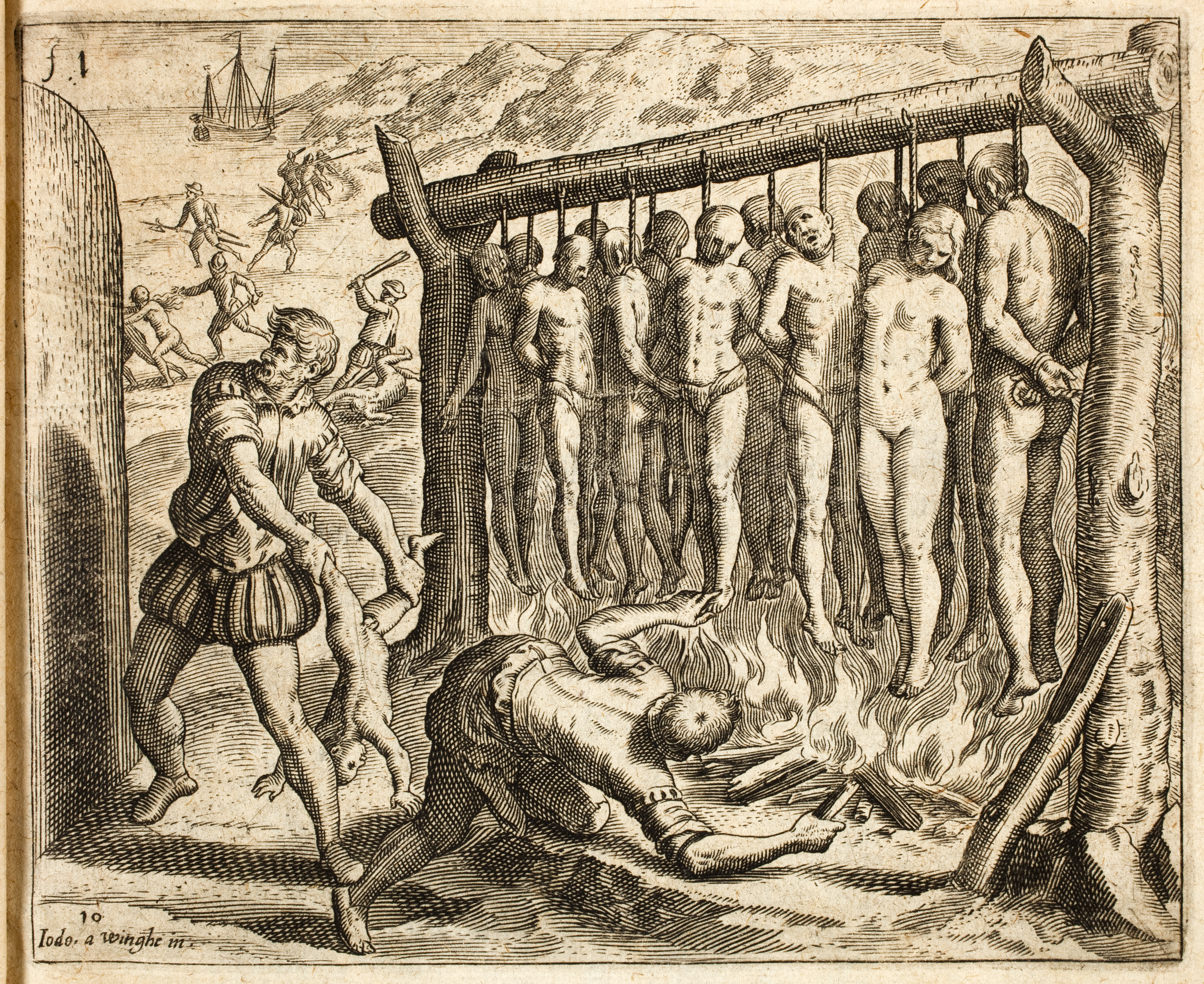
An illustration of Spanish atrocities by Theodor de Bry. Theodor de Bry's work is characteristic of the anti-Spanish propaganda that emerged in Protestant countries such as the United Provinces and England at the end of the 16th century as a result of the strong commercial and military rivalry with the Spanish Empire.

Although these laws were not always followed, they reflect the conscience of the 16th century Spanish monarchy about native rights and well-being, and its will to protect the inhabitants of Spain's territories. These laws came about in the early period of colonization, following abuses reported by Spaniards themselves traveling with Columbus. Spanish colonization methods included the forceful conversion of indigenous populations to Christianity. The "Orders to the Twelve" Franciscan friars in 1523, urged that the natives be converted using military force if necessary. On par with this sentiment, Juan Ginés de Sepúlveda argued that the Indian's inferiority justified using war to civilize and Christianize them. He encouraged enslavement and violence in order to end the barbarism of the natives. Bartolomé de las Casas, on the other hand, was strictly opposed to this viewpoint—claiming that the natives could be peacefully converted.

Such reports of Spanish abuses led to an institutional debate in Spain about the colonization process and the rights and protection of indigenous peoples of the Americas. Dominican friar Bartolomé de las Casas published Brevísima relación de la destrucción de las Indias (A Short Account of the Destruction of the Indies), a 1542 account of the alleged atrocities committed by landowners and officials during the early period of colonization of New Spain (particularly on Hispaniola). In his Short Account, de las Casas underscores the innocence of the indigenous peoples while comparing the Spanish conquistadors to "ravening wild beasts, wolves, tigers, or lions that had been starved for many days." De las Casas, son of the merchant Pedro de las Casas (who accompanied Columbus on his second voyage), described Columbus's treatment of the natives in his History of the Indies. His description of Spanish actions was used as a basis for attacks on Spain, including in Flanders during the Eighty Years' War. The accuracy of de las Casas's descriptions of Spanish colonization is still debated by some scholars due to supposed exaggerations. Although historian Lewis Hanke thought that de las Casas exaggerated atrocities in his accounts, Benjamin Keen found them more or less accurate. Charles Gibson's 1964 monograph The Aztecs under Spanish Rule (the first comprehensive study of sources about relations between Indians and Spaniards in New Spain), concludes that the demonization of Spain "builds upon the record of deliberate sadism. It flourishes in an atmosphere of indignation which removes the issue from the category of objective understanding. It is insufficient in its understanding of institutions of colonial history." However this view has been broadly criticised by other scholars such as Keen, who view Gibson's focus on legal codes rather than the copious documentary evidence of Spanish atrocities and abuses as problematic.

In 1550, Charles I tried to end this debate by halting forceful conquest. Philip II tried to follow in his footsteps with the Philippine Islands, but previous violent conquest had shaped colonial relations irreversibly. This was one of the lasting consequences that led to the dissemination of the Black legend by Spain's enemies.

The treatment of indigenous peoples during Spanish colonization was used in propaganda works of rival European powers in order to foster animosity towards the Spanish Empire. De las Casas' work was first cited in English in the 1583 work The Spanish Colonie, or Brief Chronicle of the Actes and Gestes of the Spaniards in the West Indies, at a time when England was preparing to join the Dutch Revolt on the side of the anti-Spanish rebels.

Historians have noted that the mistreatment and exploitation of indigenous peoples was committed by all European powers which colonized the Americas, and such acts were never exclusive to the Spanish Empire. The revaluation of the Black Legend on contemporary historiography has led to a reassessment of non-Spanish European colonial records in recent years as the historiographical evaluation of the Impact of Western European colonialism and colonisation continues to evolve. According to scholar William B. Maltby, "At least three generations of scholarship have produced a more balanced appreciation of Spanish conduct in both the Old World and the New, while the dismal records of other imperial powers have received a more objective appraisal."

=== War with the Netherlands ===
Spain's war with the United Provinces and, in particular, the victories and atrocities of the Castilian nobleman Fernando Álvarez de Toledo, 3rd Duke of Alba, contributed to anti-Spanish sentiment. Sent in August 1567 to counter political unrest in a part of Europe where printing presses encouraged a variety of opinions (especially against the Catholic Church), Alba seized control of the publishing industry; several printers were banished, and at least one was executed. Booksellers and printers were prosecuted and arrested for publishing banned books, many of which were part of the Index Librorum Prohibitorum.

After years of unrest in the Low Countries, the summer of 1567 saw renewed violence in which Dutch Calvinists defaced statues and decorations in Catholic monasteries and churches. The March 1567 Battle of Oosterweel was the first Spanish military response to the unrest, and the beginning of the Eighty Years' War. In 1568 Alba had prominent Dutch nobles executed in Brussels' central square, sparking anti-Spanish sentiment. In October 1572, after Orange forces captured the city of Mechelen, its lieutenant attempted to surrender when he heard that a larger Spanish army was approaching. Despite efforts to placate the troops, Fadrique Álvarez de Toledo (son of the governor of the Netherlands and commander of the duke's troops) allowed his men three days to pillage the city; Alba reported to King Philip II that "not a nail was left in the wall". A year later, magistrates were still attempting to retrieve church artifacts which Spanish soldiers had sold elsewhere.

This sack of Mechelen was the first of a series of events known as the Spanish Fury; several others occurred over the next several years. In November and December 1572, with the duke's permission, Fadrique had residents of Zutphen and Naarden locked in churches and burnt to death. In July 1573, after a six-month siege, the city of Haarlem surrendered. The garrison's men (except for the German soldiers) were drowned or had their throats cut by the duke's troops, and eminent citizens were executed. More than 10,000 Haarlemers were killed on the ramparts, nearly 2,000 burned or tortured, and double that number drowned in the river. After numerous complaints to the Spanish court, Philip II decided to change policy and relieve the Duke of Alba. Alba boasted that he had burned or executed 18,600 persons in the Netherlands, in addition to the far greater number he massacred during the war, many of them women and children; 8,000 persons were burned or hanged in one year, and the total number of Alba's Flemish victims can not have fallen short of 50,000.

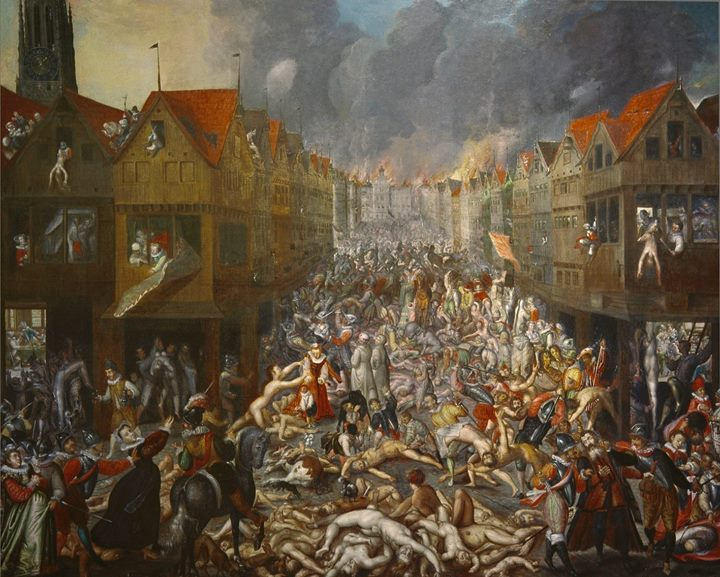
Contemporary, anonymous anti-Spanish propaganda painting of the 4 November 1576 Spanish Fury in Antwerp

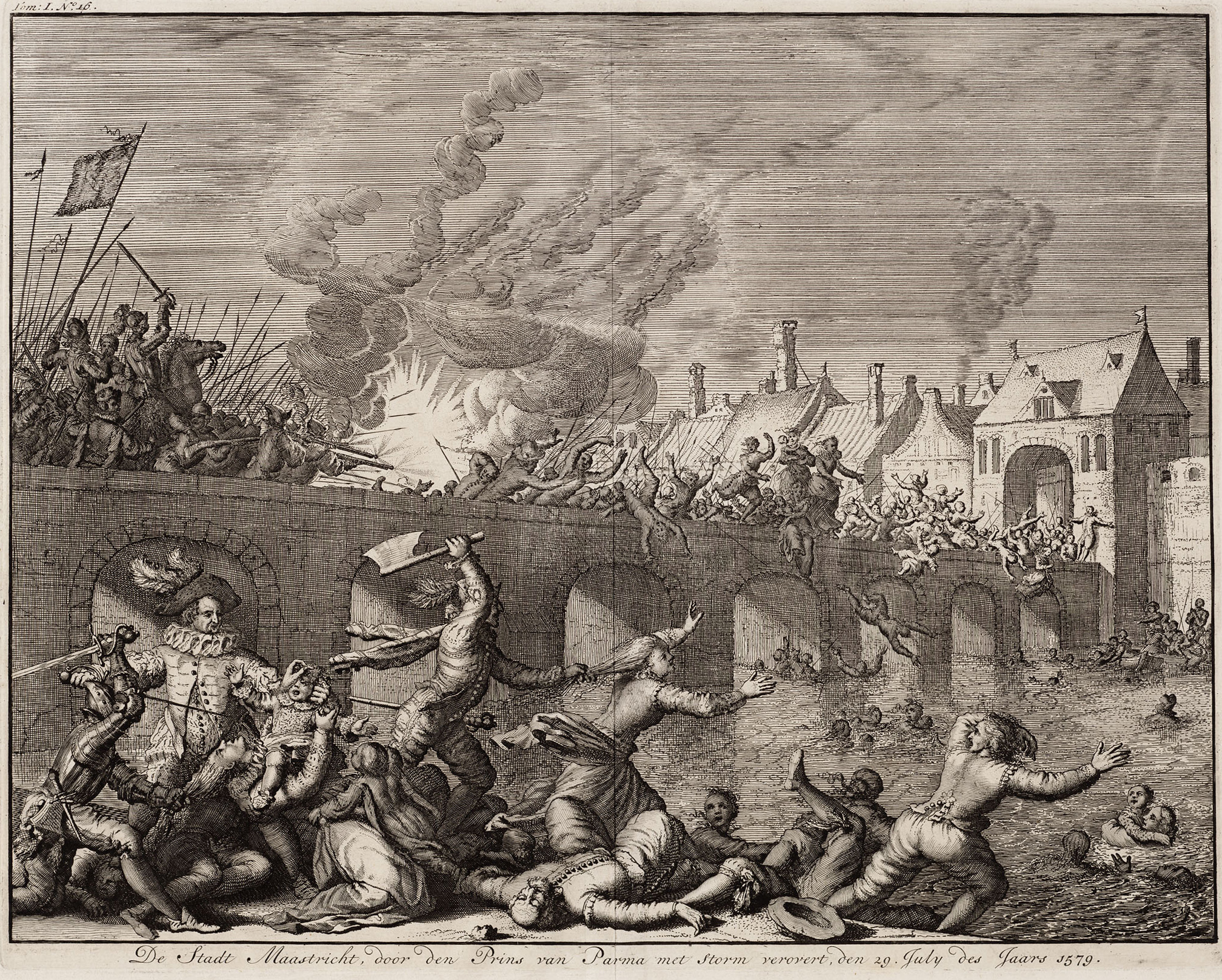
The Spanish Fury at Maastricht in 1579

The Dutch Revolt spread to the south in the mid-1570s after the Army of Flanders mutinied for lack of pay and went on the rampage in several cities, most notably Antwerp in 1576. Soldiers rampaged through the city, killing, looting, extorting money from residents and burning the homes of those who did not pay. Christophe Plantin's printing establishment was threatened with destruction three times, but was spared each time with payment of a ransom. Antwerp was economically devastated by the attack; 1,000 buildings were torched, and as many as 17,000 civilians were raped, tortured and murdered. Parents were tortured in their children's presence, infants were slain in their mother's arms, wives were flogged to death before their husbands' eyes. Maastricht was besieged, sacked and destroyed twice by the Tercios de Flandes (in 1576 and 1579), and the 1579 siege ended with a Spanish Fury which killed 10,000 men, women and children. Spanish troops who breached the city walls first raped the women, then massacred the population, reputedly tearing people limb from limb. The soldiers drowned hundreds of civilians by throwing them off the bridge over the river Maas in an episode similar to earlier events in Zutphen. Military terror defeated the Flemish movement, and restored Spanish rule in Belgium.

The propaganda created by the Dutch Revolt during the struggle against the Spanish Crown can also be seen as part of the Black Legend. The depredations against the Indians that De las Casas had described were compared to the depredations of Alba and his successors in the Netherlands. The Brevissima relación was reprinted no less than 33 times between 1578 and 1648 in the Netherlands (more than in all other European countries combined). The Articles and Resolutions of the Spanish Inquisition to Invade and Impede the Netherlands accused the Holy Office of a conspiracy to starve the Dutch population and exterminate its leading nobles, "as the Spanish had done in the Indies." Marnix of Sint-Aldegonde, a prominent propagandist for the cause of the rebels, regularly used references to alleged intentions on the part of Spain to "colonize" the Netherlands, for instance in his 1578 address to the German Diet.

In recent years, Maarten Larmuseau has used genetic testing to examine a prevalent belief regarding the Spanish occupation

War atrocities committed by the Spanish army in the Low Countries during the 16th century are so ingrained in the collective memory of Belgian and Dutch societies that they generally assume a signature of this history to be present in their genetic ancestry. Historians claim this assumption is a consequence of the so‐called "Black Legend" and negative propaganda portraying and remembering Spanish soldiers as extreme sexual aggressors.

— Maarten Larmuseau, The black legend on the Spanish presence in the low countries: Verifying shared beliefs on genetic ancestry

The memory of the large scale rape of local women by Spanish soldiers lives on to such extent that it is popularly believed that their genetic imprint can be seen today, and that most men and women with dark hair in the area descend from children conceived during those rapes. The study found no greater Iberian genetic component in the areas occupied by the Spanish army than in surrounding areas of northern France, and concluded that the genetic impact of the Spanish occupation, if any, must have been too small to survive until the present era. However, the study makes it clear that the absence of a Spanish genetic imprint in modern populations was not incompatible with the occurrence of mass sexual violence. The frequent murder of Flemish rape victims by Spanish soldiers, the fact rape does not always lead to fertilisation, and the reduced survival possibilities of the illegitimate offspring of rape victims would all militate against significant Iberian genetic contribution to modern populations. Larmuseau considers the persistence of the belief in a Spanish genetic contribution in Flanders to be the fruit of the use of Black Legend tropes in the construction of Dutch and Flemish national identities in the 16th–19th century, giving prominence to the idea of the Spanish armies' cruelty in collective memory.

In an interview with a local newspaper, Larmuseau compared the persistence in popular memory of the actions of the Spanish with the lesser attention given to the Austrians, the French and the Germans who also occupied the Low Countries and participated in violence against their inhabitants.

== Regional perspectives ==
Anachronous map of the Spanish Empire, including territorial claims

=== Italy ===
Sverker Arnoldsson of the University of Gothenburg supports Juderías' hypothesis of a Spanish black legend in European historiography and identifies its origins in medieval Italy, unlike previous authors (who date it to the 16th century). In his book The Black Legend: A Study of its Origins, Arnoldsson cites studies by Benedetto Croce and Arturo Farinelli to assert that Italy was hostile to Spain during the 14th, 15th and 16th centuries when the Crown of Aragon occupied most of Italy and texts produced and distributed there were later used as a base by Protestant nations.

Liberal historians such as Benedetto Croce see in the Risorgimento process the conclusion of the unifying trend that began with the Italian Renaissance, which suffered a long interruption between the middle of the 16th century and the beginning of the 18th century that coincided with direct domination by the Hispanic Monarchy over half of Italy and indirectly over part of the other half. Croce's statements about the Italian aristocracy and their responsibility for the decline of Italy, published in 1917, when the country was in the middle of the world war, aroused reactions, accusations and even indignation on the part of historians, writers, intellectuals and politicians and "the controversy", wrote a well-known contemporary Spanish historian, "it has not yet died out, but there are many historians who today accept, at least in part, Croce's arguments."

The vision of some Italian historians continues to identify the Spanish domination of Italy with a period of decadence for the country, due, in part, to the action of the Inquisition (the traditional religious court, not to be confused with the Spanish institution, which operated with different criteria). Authors such as Campanella or Giordano Bruno suffered persecution for religious reasons, as had also happened at the end of the fifteenth century and in the Florence of Savonarola. The identification of the occupier with oppression was part of the widely spread anti-Spanish propaganda known as the black legend, whose artistic products include Manzoni's The Betrothed (set in 17th-century Lombardy) or Verdi's Don Carlos. According to one interpretation of the Risorgimento, the historical period of Spanish misrule in Milan had been chosen by Manzoni with the intention of alluding to the same oppressive rule of Austrian rule over northern Italy. Other literary critics believe instead that what Manzoni wanted to describe was the Italian society of all times, with all its defects that have remained over time.

Arnoldsson's theory on the origins of Spain's black legend has been criticized as conflating the process of black-legend generation with a negative view (or critique) of a foreign power. The following objections have been raised:

1. The Italian origin of the earliest writings against Spain is an insufficient reason to identify Italy as the origin of the black legend; it is a normal reaction in any society dominated by a foreign power.
2. The phrase "black legend" suggests a tradition (non-existent in Italian writings) based on a reaction to the recent presence of Spanish troops (which quickly faded).
3. In 15th- and 16th-century Italy, critics and Italian intellectual admirers of Spain (particularly Ferdinand II of Aragon) coexisted.

Edward Peters states in his work "Inquisition":

In Italian anti-Spanish invective, the very Christian self-consciousness that had inspired much of the drive to purify the Spanish kingdoms, including the distinctive institution of the Spanish Inquisition, was regarded outside of Spain as a necessary cleansing, since all Spaniards were accused of having Moorish and Jewish ancestry. ... First condemned for the impurity of their Christian faith, the Spaniards then came under fire for excess of zeal in defending Catholicism. Influenced by the political and religious policies of Spain, a common kind of ethnic invective became an eloquent and vicious form of description by character assassination. Thus when Bartolomé de las Casas wrote his criticism of certain governmental policies in the New World, his limited, specific rhetorical purpose was ignored.

— Edward Peters, Inquisition

According to William S. Maltby, Italian writings lack a "conducting theme": a common narrative which would form the Spanish black legend in the Netherlands and England. Roca Barea commented that such prejudice "stemmed from the resentment felt by a wealthy, cultured people—who viewed themselves as heirs to the Roman Empire—at having to live within the orbit of a new power: Spain."

=== Germany ===
Arnoldsson offered an alternative to the Italian-origin theory in its polar opposite: the German Renaissance. German humanism, deeply nationalistic, wanted to create a German identity in opposition to that of the Roman invaders. Ulrich of Hutten and Martin Luther, the main authors of the movement, used "Roman" in the broader concept "Latin". The Latin world, which included Spain, Portugal, France, and Italy, was perceived as "foreign, immoral, chaotic and fake, in opposition to the moral, ordered and German."

In addition to the identification of Spaniards with Jews, heretics, and "Africans", there was an increase in anti-Spanish propaganda by detractors of Emperor Charles V. The propaganda against Charles was nationalistic, identifying him with Spain and Rome although he was born in Flanders, spoke Dutch but little Spanish and no Italian at the time, and was often at odds with the pope.

To further the appeal of their cause, rulers opposed to Charles focused on identifying him with the pope (a view Charles had encouraged to force Spanish troops to accept involvement in his German wars, which they had resisted). The fact that troops and supporters of Charles included German and Protestant princes and soldiers was an extra reason to reject the Spanish elements attached to them. It was necessary to instill fear of Spanish rule, and a certain image had to be created. Among published points most often highlighted were the identification of Spaniards with Arabs, Berbers, and Jews (due to the frequency of intermarriage), the number of conversos (Jews or Muslims who converted to Christianity) in their society, and the "natural cruelty of those two."

=== England/Britain ===
Spanish statesman Antonio Pérez del Hierro, who served as the secretary to Philip II of Spain before fleeing to France and then England after being arrested, wrote Pedacos de Historia o Relaciones, which was published in London by English printer Richard Field in 1594. The work, which was read widely in England, heavily denounced the Spanish monarchy and further contributed to pre-existing anti-Spanish and anti-Catholic sentiments among the English. A violently hispanophobic preacher and pamphleteer, Thomas Scott, would echo this sort of epithet a generation later, in the 1620s, when he urged England to go to war against "those wolvish Antichristians" instead of accepting the Spanish match.

William S. Maltby, regarding Spain in the Netherlands, said that:

As part of an Elizabethan campaign against Spain and the Catholic Church ... Literally hundreds of anti-Spanish publications appeared in English, Dutch, French, and German in the sixteenth century. New editions, and new works restating old accusations, would appear in the Thirty Years War and in other occasions when it seemed useful to excite anti-Spanish sentiment. Given the pervasiveness of such material, it is not surprising that the authors of scholarly histories absorbed anti-hispanism and transmitted it to later generations.

— William S. Maltby, The Rise and Fall of the Spanish Empire

=== Sephardic Jews ===
According to Philip Wayne Powell, the criticism which was spread by the Jews who were expelled by Spain's Catholic monarchs was an important factor in the spread of anti-Spanish sentiment (particularly religious stereotypes). Powell places the beginning of the criticism of the Jewish populations against Spain in 1480, with the creation of the Spanish Inquisition, which was directed mainly against crypto-Jews and false converts. But it was from the expulsion of 1492 that this opinion became general. Despite the fact that they had previously been expelled from almost all European countries, in no other had they had such deep roots during the Middle Ages, coming to live what has been called a Golden Age, giving special relevance to this expulsion. The persecution of Jews, crypto-Jews, Muslims and converts was viewed favorably in the rest of Europe and even applauded in the case of "a country so mixed with Jews and Moors" like Spain.

Studies by Kaplan, Yerushalmi, Mechoulan and Jaime Contreras show that many expelled Jewish intellectuals collaborated in spreading the negative image of Spain. The largest Sephardic community was in Amsterdam, in the Netherlands, with two synagogues. His activity, "little affected to the service of his Majesty", came to provoke the protest of the Spanish ambassadors before the archduke in Brussels. Especially hated was the Inquisition, considered the "fourth beast spoken of by the prophet Daniel", a denatured justification, an accumulation of evil, which had corrupted society. Criticism spread to Flanders and Venice, where Sephardim had also settled. Thus, the communities publicized the executions of the Inquisition, such as the one that occurred in 1655 in Córdoba.

The Sephardim were grateful to their new homeland during the Eighty Years' War: just as Spain was a "land of idolatry" and slavery, like Egypt, whose rulers suffer the curse of Yahweh; The Netherlands, on the other hand, is the land of freedom, on which the God of Israel will bring down all the blessings, as Daniel Levi de Barrios or Menasseh Ben Israel (previously called Manoel Soeiro) wrote. They also used their power within the publishing industry, both to support the Dutch in their struggle and to spread criticism of Spain.

=== Islamophobia and antisemitism ===
In Italian anti-Spanish invective ... the Spanish Inquisition ... was regarded as a necessary cleansing, since all Spaniards were accused of having Moorish and Jewish ancestry. ... First condemned by the impurity of their Christian faith, the Spaniards then came under fire for excess of zeal in defending Catholicism. Influenced by the political and religious policies of Spain, a common type of ethnic invective became an eloquent and vicious form of description by character assassination. Thus when Bartolomé de las Casas wrote his criticism of certain governmental policies in the New World, his limited, specific purpose was ignored.

— Edward Peters, Inquisition (1989)

According to Elvira Roca Barea, the Spanish Black Legend is a variant of the antisemitic narratives which had already been circulated in medieval-era Northern, Central and Southern European nations since the 13th century, critical of the perceived tolerance of Jews and heretics in Spain. In 1555, after the expulsion of the Spanish Jews, Pope Paul IV described Spaniards as "heretics, schismatics, accursed of God, the offspring of Jews and Moors, the very scum of the earth". This climate would facilitate the transfer of antisemitic and anti-Muslim stereotypes to Spaniards. This case has three main sources of proof, the texts of German Renascence Intellectuals, the existence of the black legend narrative in Europe prior to the conquest of America, and the similarity of the stereotypes to other stereotypes which were attributed to Judaism by anti-Semitic Europeans and the stereotypes which the Black Legend attributed to the Spanish.

Martin Luther correlated "the Jew" (who was detested in Germany at the time) with "the Spanish", whose power was increasing in the region. According to Sverker Arnoldsson, Luther:

- Identified Italy and Spain with the papacy, even though the Pontifical States and Spain were enemies at the time
- Ignored the coexistence (including intermarriage) of Christians and Jews in Spain
- Conflated Spain and Turkey out of fear of an invasion by either power.

In 1566, Luther's conversations were published. Among many other similar affirmations, he is quoted as saying:

... Spaniern ..., die essen gern weiss Brot vnd küssen gern weisse Meidlein, vnd sind sie stiffelbraun vnd pechschwartz wie König Balthasar mit seinem Affen.
The Spanish eat white bread with pleasure and kiss white women with pleasure, but they are as dirt-brown and tar-black as King Balthasar and his monkeys.

— Johann Fischart, Geschichtklitterung (1575).

Ideo prophetatum est Hispanos velle subigere Germaniam aut per se aut per alios, scilicet Turcam ... Et ita Germania vexabitur et viribus ac bonis suis exhausta Hispanico regno subiugabitur. Eo tendit Sathan, quod Germaniam liberam perturbare tentat
Thus, it is prophesied that the Spaniards want to subjugate Germany, by itself or through others, such as the Turks. And so Germany will be humiliated and stripped of its men and property, will be submitted to the kingdom of Spain. Satan tries this because he tries to prevent a free Germany

— Luther

== Distribution ==
Proponents such as Powell, Mignolo and Roca Barea allege that the Spanish Black Legend prevails in most of Europe, especially Protestant nations and France, and the Americas. There is, however, no significant trace of it in the Muslim world or Turkey despite the almost seven centuries of sustained warfare in which Spain and the Islamic world were engaged. Historian Walter Mignolo has argued that the Black Legend was closely tied to ideologies of race, both in the way that it used the Moorish (Arab and Berber) history of Spain to depict Spaniards as racially tainted, and in the way that the treatment of Native Americans and enslaved sub-Saharan Africans during Spanish colonial projects came to symbolize their moral character.

=== America ===
The first Puritan settlers were deeply hostile to Spain, seeing themselves as the Protestant advance guard that would free the Indians from Spanish oppression and cruelty. Prominent among these Puritan authors was Cotton Mather, who translated the Bible into Spanish for distribution among the Indians of New Spain. After its independence, the United States soon became a territorial rival of Spain in America, both on the border with New Spain, and in Florida, the Mississippi or in New Orleans, a port that the Americans wanted to export their products from. The enlightened and liberal ideas that had entered the United States in the eighteenth century, joined their sympathies for the new republics emerging to the south, increasing anti-Spanish sentiment. This hostility reached its zenith during the Spanish–American War, when the propaganda machine of Hearst and Pulitzer, used by their newspaper empires, had an enormous influence on public opinion in their country. The hispanophobic speeches heard in Congress during the conflict were so insulting that they led to massive protests in Spain.

The tensions in Hispanic America between the upper classes of creoles and peninsulares, that is, the Spaniards from the Iberian Peninsula, predate the independence of the Latin American countries. It was a confrontation for the right to control and exploit the riches of the American lands and peoples and that, in general, did not affect the lower classes. Around 1800, the ideas of the Enlightenment, with its anticlericalism, its skepticism to authorities, and its support by Masonic lodges, had been enthusiastically embraced among American intellectuals. According to Powell, these ideas were mixed with the black legend, that is, with the identification of Spain as a "horrible example" of obscurantism and backwardness, as an enemy of modernity. Indeed, he claims that the American wars of independence were to some degree civil wars, with the rebels led by minorities of Creoles.

With this background, Powell argues that the rebels were able to use the black legend as a propaganda weapon against the metropolis. Countless manifestos and proclamations were published quoting and praising Las Casas, poems and hymns describing the depraved nature of the "Spaniards", letters and pamphlets designed to advance the patriotic cause. One of the first was the Peruvian Juan Pablo Vizcardo y Guzmán in his Carta dirigida a los españoles americanos por uno de sus compatriotas, accusing the metropolis of the serious exploitation suffered, summarizing the situation as «ingratitude, injustice, servitude and desolation». Another example is one of the great heroes of American independence, Simón Bolívar, an admirer of Las Casas, whose texts he would use profusely, blamed the Spanish for all the sins committed in America (by Creoles and non-Creoles) in the last 200 years, making the Creoles the victims, the "colonized". He would also be one of the first to appeal for the theft of American wealth and claim its return.

This anti-Spanish mentality was maintained during the 19th century and part of the 20th among the liberal elites, who considered "de-Hispanization" the solution to national problems. The historian Powell affirms that as a consequence of denigrating Spanish culture, it has been possible to denigrate their own, of which the first is a part, both in their own eyes and in foreign eyes. In addition, the fact would have produced a certain lack of roots among the American peoples, by rejecting part of their own.

During the War of the Pacific (1879–1884) some Chilean narratives portrayed the war against Peru and Bolivia as a "civilizing crusade" against a backward Ancien régime that fought with armies of Indigenous barbarians. Thus, Bolivia and Peru were negatively portrayed to represent a backward Spanish past which Chile had superseded.

=== Europe ===
At the same time, on the beginning of the 19th century, a school of liberal historians appeared in Spain and France who began to speak of the Spanish decline, considering the Inquisition responsible for this economic and cultural decline and for all the ills that afflicted the country. Other European historians would take up the subject later, maintaining this position in some authors until today. The reasoning stated that the expulsion of the Jews and the persecution of the converts would have led to the impoverishment and decline of Spain, in addition to the destruction of the middle class. In 1867 Joaquín Costa had also raised the issue of Spanish decline. Both he and Lucas Mallada wondered if the fact was due to the Spanish character. He was joined by French and Italian sociologists, anthropologists and criminologists, who spoke more of "degeneration" than decadence, and later other Spaniards such as Rafael Salillas or Ángel Pulido. Pompeu Gener blamed Spanish decadence on religious intolerance and Juan Valera on Spanish pride. These ideas passed into literature with the Generation of '98, in texts by Pío Baroja, Azorín and Antonio Machado: «[Castilla...] a piece of the planet crossed by the wandering shadow of Caín»; reaching in some extremes to masochism and the inferiority complex. Joseph Pérez relates this rejection of one part of his own history (the expulsion of the Jews, the Inquisition, the conquest of America) and the idealization of another (Al-Andalus) with similar movements in Portugal and France.

Also, after the Unification of Italy, many Italian historians tended to narrate in a negative way the time when part of the Italian peninsula had formed a dynastic union with Spain. In particular, Gabriele Pepe denounced what in his eyes had been the plunder and corruption of southern Italy "under the Spanish". This view only began to change in the last third of the 20th century, thanks to a series of congresses and authors such as Rosario Villari and Elena Fasano Guarini. The works of Alessandro Manzoni and Giuseppe Verdi also propagated anti-Spanish propaganda on Italian literature.

=== Southeast Asia ===
The period of Spanish rule in the Philippines is often presented negatively in the present day. Although the Philippine Islands were occupied by both Spain and the United States and the Empire of Japan, only the Spaniards were considered as the oppressors who kept the society in feudal backwardness, along with the development of a servile mentality and the cause of the ignorance through religious fanaticism, while the Americans were portrayed as liberators of the nation in the process of building a national identity against the interference of other powers (the Spanish Catholics and the Islamic sultanates), who, with their defects, were able to bring Modernization in the Islands with its liberal policies. A lot of investigators mention that United States Military Government of the Philippine Islands has an important role in the construction of anti-Spanish propaganda on Philippines' education. The anti-Spanish propaganda has endured in historiography to this day, since scholars used to copy from the same standard books that have distorted the images of the Philippines with such tropes of the black legend. That being the case, it has been denounced that "official" historiography in the Philippines, from the nationalist and liberal school, has lacked objectivity by assuming long-repeated misconceptions regarding the early modern history of the Philippines.

According to Phillip Powell, the leading historians of the United States in the 19th century, Francis Parkman, George Bancroft, William H. Prescott, and John Lothrop Motley, would also write History tinged with the black legend, texts that remain important in later American historiography. An example of this is The Philippine Islands, 1493–1898, important source of Philippine history for non-Spanish speakers that has been criticized by modern historians, notably Glòria Cano, for deliberately distorting the original Spanish documents to portray the Captaincy General of the Philippines in a negative light. In addition, after the United States Occupation of the Philippines, the Schurman Commission was carried out, with the purpose of preparing the conditions for the government of the Philippine islands, and in which the Philippine upper class of the Principalía and the Ilustrado intellectuals participated. Thus, Jacob Schurman built and shaped a discourse that emphasized a negative view of the Philippine Republic (while declaring that the Filipinos are not ready for independence) and outlined an obscurantist image of the Spanish regime, for which they appealed typical dichotomies between modernity vs. tradition, where the Spanish regime represented an apparent medieval and reactionary backwardness, while the US administration presented itself as liberal and progressive.

Thus, the Americans in the Philippines developed a narrative with they belittled Spain, following the traditional lines of the Black Legend, as a feudal, exploitative and oppressive power, while also praising the Hispanic legacy in the Filipino (on a more social than political level), especially their conversion of "savages" to Christianity, but at the cost of underestimating Filipino customs (many of Hispanic origin by Catholic tradition, which the Americans considered a mistake for the Spanish to seek to achieve cultural syncretism with the barbaric and pagan). American works such as The Philippine Islands, 1493–1898, by Blair and Robertson, or The Americans in the Philippines, by James LeRoy, have been accused of having presented a caricatural image of Spanish history in the islands, as well as giving an erroneous image of the Catholic Church and its power as opposed to any possibility of social reforms in the Philippines. The US administration invoked negative views of Spanish colonialism to legitimize its occupation of the islands during the next decades, as a benevolent, modern and democratic colonization against a tyrannical and backward malevolent colonizer who had not been able to develop a national identity to the Filipinos.

== Modern era ==
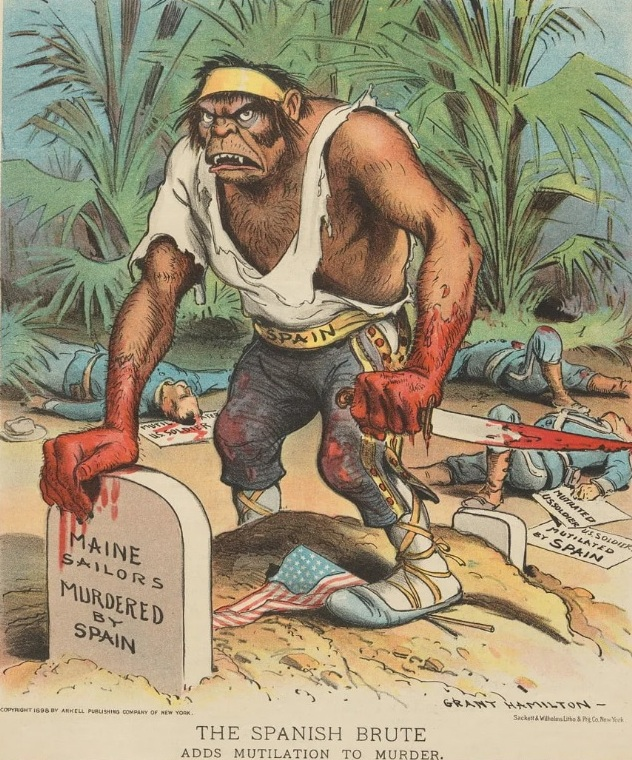
The Spanish Brute, US cartoon, 1898

Historians disagree on whether the Black Legend exists as a genuine factor in current discourse around Spain and its history. In recent years a group of historians including Alfredo Alvar, Ricardo García Cárcel and Lourdes Mateo Bretos have argued that the Black Legend does not currently exist beyond Spanish society's own perception of how the world views Spain's legacy. According to Carmen Iglesias, the Black Legend consists of negative traits which the Spanish people see in themselves and is shaped by political propaganda.

The view of the group around García Cárcel is echoed by Benjamin Keen, writing in 1969. He argues that the concept of the Black Legend cannot be considered valid, given that the negative depiction of Spanish behavior in the Americas was largely accurate. He further claims that whether a concerted campaign of anti-Spanish propaganda based on imperial rivalry ever existed is at least open to question.

Henry Kamen argues that the Black Legend existed during the 16th century but has disappeared in contemporary perceptions of Spain. However, other authors, like Elvira Roca Barea, Tony Horowitz and Philip Wayne Powell, have argued that it still affects the manner in which Spain is perceived, and that it is brought up strategically during diplomatic conflicts of interest as well as in popular culture to draw attention away from the negative actions of other nations. Historian John Tate Lanning argued that the most detrimental impact of the Black Legend was to reduce the Spanish colonization of the Americas (and the resulting culture that emerged) to "three centuries of theocracy, obscurantism, and barbarism." In 2006, Tony Horowitz argued in The New York Times that the Spanish Black Legend affected current U.S. immigration policy.

In her 2016 book exploring “empire-phobia” as a recurring sociopolitical phenomenon in human history, Elvira Roca Barea argues that the unique persistence of the Spanish Black Legend beyond the end of the Spanish Empire is tied to a continued anti-Spanish and anti-Catholic sentiment in traditionally Protestant European countries:

If we deprive Europe of its hispanophobia and anti-Catholicism, its modern history becomes incomprehensible.

José Luis Villacañas, in his 2019 response to Roca Barea, labels her work as "populist national-Catholic propaganda" and accuses her of minimising Spanish atrocities in the Americas along with those of the Inquisition. He argues that, for all intents and purposes, the Black Legend has no meaning outside the context of 17th century propaganda, although he recognises that certain negative stereotypes of Spain may have persisted during the Franco regime.

García Cárcel criticises Roca Barea's position as adding to a long tradition of Spanish society's insecurities about how other countries perceive it. On the other hand, he also criticizes Villacañas's discourse as being heavily ideological in the opposite direction and systematically indulging in presentism. García Cárcel calls for an analysis of Spain's history that renounces both “narcissism and masochism” in favor of nuanced awareness of its “lights and shadows”.

Other proponents of the continuity theory include musicologist Judith Etzion and Roberto Fernandez Retamar, Venezuelan writer Gilberto Ramón Quintero Lugo and Samuel Amago who, in his essay "Why Spaniards Make Good Bad Guys" analyzes the persistence of the legend in contemporary European cinema.

In 1992 Ridley Scott's movie 1492: Conquest of Paradise was accused that the Black Legend had influenced the story, albeit mainly by Spanish language press.

== White Legend ==
The label "White Legend" (Leyenda Blanca) is used to describe a historiographic approach which presents an uncritical or idealized image of Spanish colonial practices. Some authors consider this to be the result of taking attempts to counter the bias of the Black Legend too far, whereas others consider it to have developed independently.

Dominican Historian Esteban Mira Caballos argues that the Black and White legends form part of a single unity, which he calls a "Great Lie". He goes on to describe the way the Black Legend is instrumentalised to support the White Legend:

The consequence of the positioning of those who allude to the Black Legend in order to, in reality, defend the White Legend, has been to silence any criticism of the past: We were marvellous, and anything negative anyone has to say about us is fruit of the Black Legend. And without the possibility of criticism, the science of History loses all meaning.

— Esteban Mira Caballos, Mito, realidad y actualidad de la leyenda negra

The "White Legend" or the "Pink Legend" (Sp: Leyenda Rosa) may also refer to the propaganda which was circulated within Spain by Philip II and his descendants, propaganda which claimed that his actions in the Netherlands and America were religiously motivated, so his own patrimony would be preserved. This propaganda was intended to foster the image that Spain was ruled by a prudent and pious monarch, and control the unrest that was generated by his aggressive policies and his wars in the Netherlands.

== See also ==
- África empieza en los Pirineos – Derogatory expression
- Anti-Catholicism – Hostility or prejudice towards Catholics
- Antisemitic trope – False claims about Jews and Judaism
- Atrocity propaganda – Spreading lies about enemy crimes
- Australian history wars – Public debate in Australia over British colonialism ("black armband")
- Black Legend of the Spanish Inquisition – Alleged anti-Spanish historiography regarding the Spanish Inquisition
- Colonial mentality – Internalized attitude of ethnic or cultural inferiority
- Cultural depictions of Philip II of Spain
- Historical revisionism – Reinterpretation of a historical account
- Islamophobia – Discrimination against Islam or Muslims
- Lost cause of the Confederacy – Negationist myth of the American Civil War
- Accusation in a mirror – Hate speech incitement technique
- Population history of indigenous peoples of the Americas
- Stereotypes of Hispanic and Latino Americans in the United States
- Stereotypes of Jews – Generalized representations of Jewish people
- White legend – Uncritical view of Spanish colonialism
