= Sverker Arnoldsson =

Sverker Arnolsson (1908–1959) was a Swedish historian and philologist.

He was one of the most important historians and hispanists of the 20th century. He was born in Sundsvall, February the 17th 1908, and died in Gothenburg, November the 10th 1959. He started his career interested in Swedish military history but quickly got interested in the history of the Spanish Empire. He is most recognized for his work regarding the Spanish Black Legend.

== Bio ==
Arnoldsson got his PhD from University of Gothenburg in 1937. His thesis, Svensk-fransk krigs- och fresdapolitik i Tyskland 1634–1636 ("The policy of war and peace Swedish-German in Germany 1634–1636". Gotemburg, 1937), was based around the Thirty Years War. Initially, his main interest was Swedish History, but through his thesis work he got fascinated with the Spanish Empire.

Arnolsson was particularly interested in written expressions of history, such as archives, poems, and propaganda. His interest in Hispanic culture was mainly focused on culture and literature. He is one of the authors that explored the Spanish Black Legend.

In 1937 he got a position as assistant professor. He won a Rockefeller scholarship to study in the Argentinian, Mexican, and USA's National Archives. This work was followed by various studies in Spain and Portugal in 1954 and 1958. His work during that time got him special recognition in Europe. In 1958 he was invited to Spain as a special Speaker during the celebration of the IV centenary of the death of Charles V. He became member of the National Academy of History of Buenos Aires.

== Publications ==
1. Svensk-fransk krigs- och fresdapolitik i Tyskland 1634-1636 (“The policy of war and peace Swedish-German in Germany 1634-1636”. Gotemburg, 1937)
2. Krigspropagandan i Sverige före trettioåriga kriget (“Political propaganda política in Sweden prior to the Thirty Years War in Acta Universitatis Gotoburgensis, XLVII, Gotemburg, 1941).
3. Johan III:s litterära själprotarair (“The Literary Self-Portrait of John III, in Studier tillägnade Curt Weibull, Gotemburg, 1946).
4. “Svarta Legenden” (“The Black Legend”, Göteborgs Morgonpost, 1947)
5. “Nicolás Guillén – svart skald från Cuba” (“N. G. – black poet of Cuba”. Göteborgs Morgonpost, 1948).
6. “Den spanska erövringen av Amerika i eftervärldens dom” (“The Spanish Conquest in America according to the judgement of Posterity-leftovers of The Black legend. Svensk Tidskrift, XI, nr. 6, Estocolm, 1953).
7. “Några intryck från spanskamerikanska arkiv och biblioteket” (“Some thoughts from archives and libraries of Spain and Hispano-America”, Arkiv, smahälle och forskning. Estocolm, 1953).
8. San Martín y sus contemporáneos suecos”, ("San Marín and his Swedish contemporanies." Tribute from the National Academy of History in the Centenary of his Death, 1850–1950. Tomo I. Buenos IAres, 1951)
9. “La historiografía moderna en Suecia”, ("Modern historiography in Sweden" in Boletín de la Academia Nacional de la Historia (XXV. Buenos Aires, 1951).

== Translations ==
He translated to Swedish various books of Latin American Poetry, such as Pablo Neruda's and Romeo Murga´s poems, in Götheborgske Spionen (12, nr. 3, Gotemburgo, 1947); poems by Jaime Torres Bodet and Nicolás Guillén, in Ord y Bild (59, nr. 4, Estocolmo 1950); poems by César Vallejo, in Svenska Dagbladet ( 1951), and by Fernán Silva Valdés, in Götheborgske Spionen (1952). He is the author of an anthology of Latin American poetry translated to Swedish: Hettan spränger natten (“The heat that scratches the night”. Estocolm. Gebers, 1956).
