= Benjamin Keen =

American historian

Benjamin Keen (1913–2002) was an American historian specializing in the history of colonial Latin America.

Keen received his PhD from Yale and taught at Amherst College, West Virginia University, and Jersey State College before joining Northern Illinois University in 1965. He retired in 1981. In 1985 he received the Distinguished Service Award of the Conference on Latin American History.

His first work was Latin American Civilization: History and Society: 1492 to the Present, first published in 1955 and appearing in its seventh edition in 2000. Another textbook published in six editions was his A History of Latin America. In Aztec Image in Western Thought he documents how Western intellectuals have changed their views of the Aztec culture since the first years of conquest and until modern times. He also examined how Western historiography have interpreted Christopher Columbus and Bartolomé de Las Casas since the fifteenth century. He also published translations of the chronicle of the 16th-century Spanish judge Alonso de Zorita in Life and Labor in Ancient Mexico: The Brief and Summary Relation of the Lords of New Spain and of Fernando Columbus’ The Life of the Admiral Christopher Columbus.

He was also known as a debater of historiography, and participated in a famous exchange with historian Lewis Hanke beginning in the late 1960s where he accused the latter of having gone too far in his debunking of the Spanish Black Legend - the historiographic tradition exaggerating the cruelty of the Spanish Colonial empire - and instead having participated in the creation of a White Legend.

Keen was married to Betty from 1937 to her death in 1996. The couple raised four children. He died on November 1, 2002, in Santa Fe, New Mexico.

== Selected works ==
- David Curtis DeForest and the Revolution. New Haven: Yale University Press, 1947.
- Readings in Latin American Civilization: 1492 to the Present. Boston: Houghton Mifflin, 1955.
- “The Black Legend Revisited: Assumptions and Realities,” Hispanic American Historical Review 49, no. 4 (Nov. 1969): 703–19.
- “The White Legend Revisited: A Reply to Professor Hanke’s ‘Modest Proposal,’” Hispanic American Historical Review 51, no. 2 (May 1971): 336–55.
- The Aztec Image in Western Thought. New Brunswick: Rutgers Univ. Press, 1971.
- With Juan Friede. Bartolomé de Las Casas in History: Toward an Understanding of the Man and His Work. DeKalb: Northern Illinois Univ. Press, 1971.
- “The Legacy of Bartolomé de Las Casas,” Ibero-Americana Pragensia 11 (1977): 57–67.
- With Mark Wasserman. A Short History of Latin America. Boston: Houghton Mifflin, 1980.
- “Main Currents in United States Writings on Colonial Spanish America, 1884–1984,” Hispanic American Historical Review 65, no. 4 (Nov. 1985): 657– 82.
- Essays in the Intellectual History of Colonial Latin America. Boulder, Colo.: Westview Press, 1998.
- With Keith Haynes. A History of Latin America. Boston: Houghton Mifflin, 1999 (sixth ed.).
- Latin American Civilization: History and Society, 1492 to the Present. Boulder, Colo.: Westview Press, 2000 (seventh rev. ed.).
