= Alfredo Alvar =

Spanish historian, research professor

Alfredo Alvar Ezquerra (Granada, 1960) is a Spanish historian, research professor at the Spanish National Research Council (CSIC) and modern history specialist. He is a correspondent academician at the Royal Academy of History and associated professor at the Complutense University of Madrid.

He is son to Manuel Alvar, a prominent Spanish philologist.

== Teachings and research ==
Alvar's research has been almost totally concentrated on the Spanish Modern Age; in his first years, the kingdom of Philip II and how Madrid became the permanent headquarters of the Court drew his attention; afterwards, his fields of research have comprised, to name a few, historiography, arbitrismo (judgments proposed to solve problems of the kingdom, mainly regarding the dire situation of the royal treasury; it can be considered one of the first economic literature of the Modern Age) and biographies of relevant people in the Spanish 16th and 17th centuries. Anthony Giddens’ theory of structuration and the Annales School and Fernand Braudel, have been extremely influential in Alvar's thinking, and sociology and economy are present throughout his works.

Innovation in History comes mainly as a result of either a new interpretation of old (that is, already used) sources, or bringing to light unknown data and sources. Probably, Alvar's most defining methodological feature has been the permanent quest for new scientific sources, something straightforward even from his very first book (the Accounts and Letters, by Antonio Pérez, Phillip's II secretary), but especially in his last biographies (Isabella I of Castile, Miguel de Cervantes) and a research project regarding the minutes of Madrid's town hall meetings in the last decades of the 16th century.

Professor Alvar has participated in 18 scientific projects and he has been leading researcher in 14 of them. Beyond his teachings at the Complutense University, he set up the Chair of Spanish Modern History in Quito, Ecuador, where he was invited professor.

But if there is one field where Alfredo Alvar is active, that is scientific diffusion. He is or has been actively engaged in different scientific journals, directing some of them and his different courses, lectures and seminars are a constant feature of Madrid's cultural life.

== Works ==
Among his almost twenty books, the most remarkable are:

- The birth of a European capital city. Madrid between 1561 and 1606, awarded the Villa de Madrid prize for Essay and Humanities in 1989, when Alvar was just 31.
- Caesar Charles: from Ghent to El Escorial. His biography of Charles V, institutional present of BBVA, Best Graphic Work and First Prize for Books in the Graphies 99.
- The dossier of the errant courtier, institutional present of Madrid's Mayor in 2006.
- Isabella I of Castile. A triumphant queen, a defeated woman.
- Cervantes. Genius and freedom; this has been the first biography of the Spanish writer made by a historian.

Moreover, Alvar has coordinated and edited complete collections of history books and some remarkable titles for Spanish historiography, such as the forementioned Accounts and Letters, by Antonio Pérez (edited with just 25 years); the edition of the Spanish translation (by Andrés Laguna, physician of kings Charles I and Phillip II) of De Materia Medica by Dioscorides, and the encyclopaedical Topographical Accounts of Phillip II, an extremely interesting effort to know how there were the different villages of the kingdom, but not, as it was previously assumed before Alvar's work, a mere accountability study in order to tax them.
