= David Curtis DeForest =

19th-century merchant and diplomat

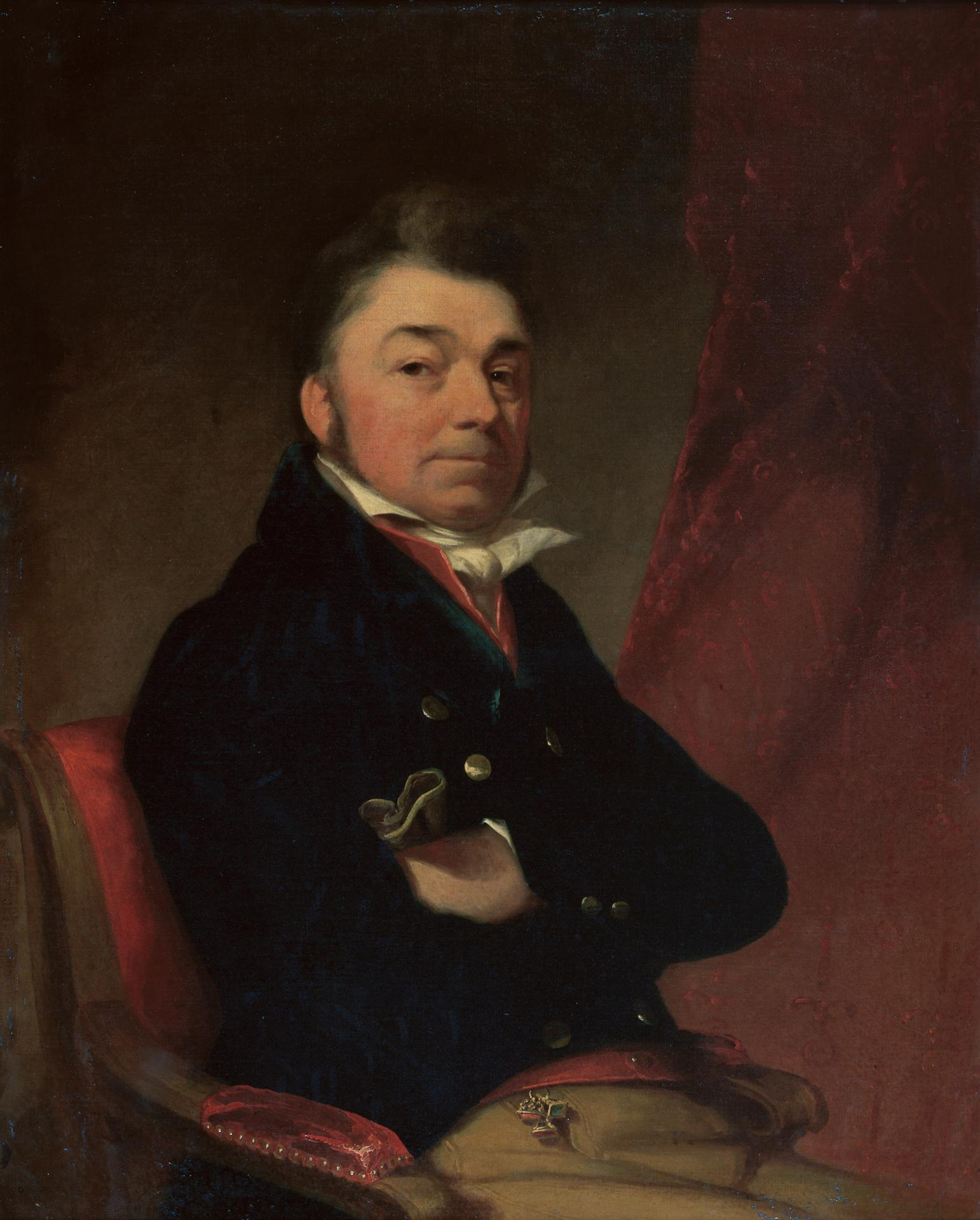
Portrait of David Curtis DeForest at Yale University Art Gallery in New Haven, Connecticut, USA. Oil on canvas by Samuel Finley Breese Morse (1791–1872).

David Curtis DeForest (January 10, 1774 – February 22, 1825) was an American merchant, privateer, and diplomat who played a significant role in fostering commercial and political relations between the United States and the newly independent states of Spanish America, particularly the United Provinces of the Río de la Plata (modern-day Argentina). His career spanned a quarter-century of revolutionary upheavals and is documented as a rich source for the study of commercial and political aspects during the terms of presidents Jefferson, Madison, and Monroe, the Napoleonic era, and the South American independence wars.

== Life ==
=== Early life ===
DeForest was born in Huntington, Connecticut, in 1774, into a distinguished New England family descendent from Belgian Huguenots. His bold disposition led him to abandon early business failures and a brief commission as a lieutenant in the US Army for a life at sea.

DeForest first arrived in the Rio de la Plata in 1802 after learning the art of doing business in Brazil and other South American ports. He initially resided for seven months in a Franciscan monastery in Buenos Aires to master the Spanish language and observe the colonial trade, and returned (via England) to the United States, where he sailed in command of trading ships.

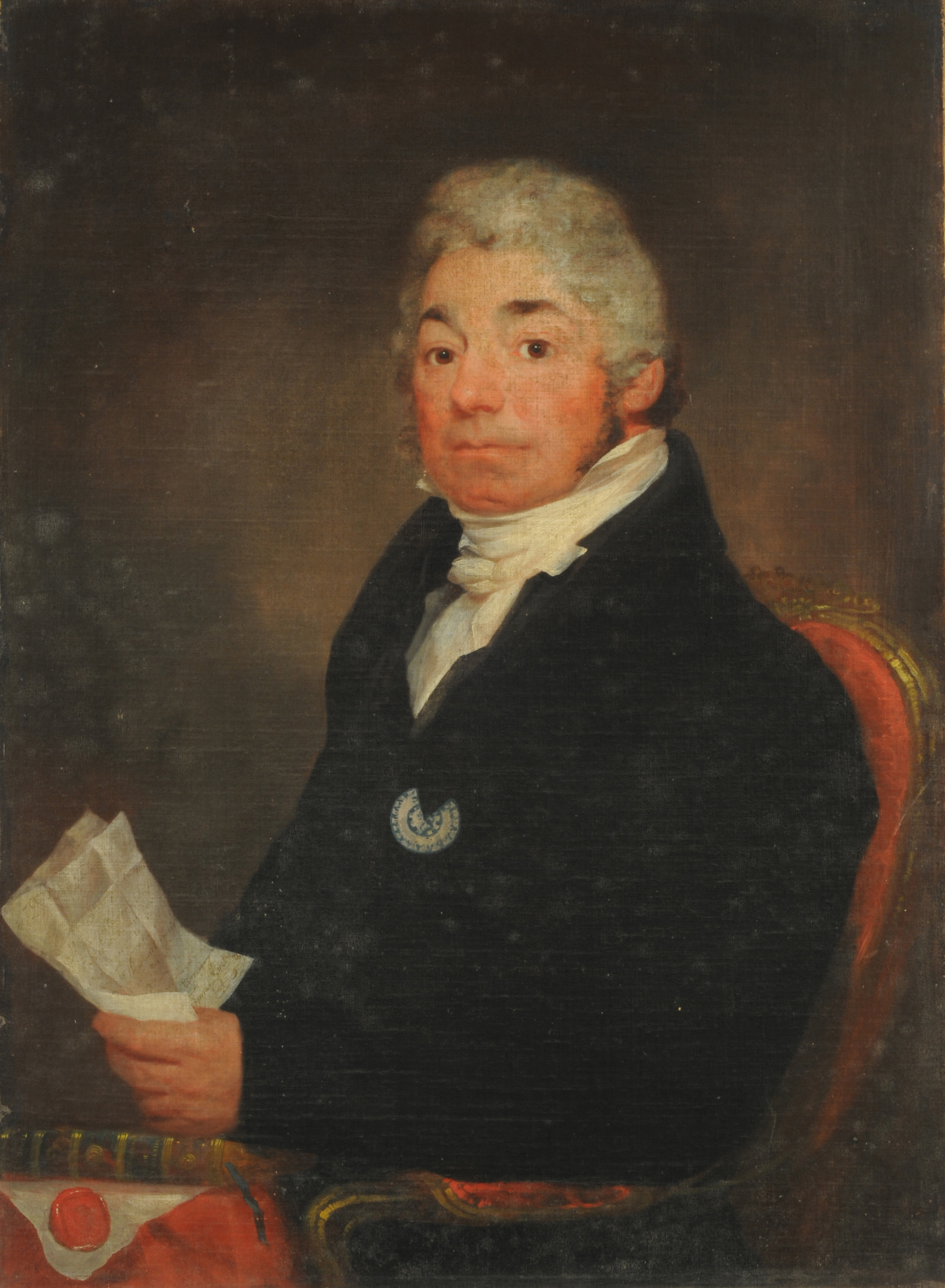
Portrait of David Curtis DeForest at the Museo Nacional de Bellas Artes in Buenos Aires, Argentina. Oil on canvas by Samuel Finley Breese Morse.

=== Established in Buenos Aires - Commerce and arming privateers ===
By 1806, DeForest established himself as a permanent merchant in Buenos Aires, where he became a prominent figure in the local social and commercial circles during the era of the British invasions. As it happened to many other ‘strangers’ in the city, Viceroy Baltasar Hidalgo de Cisneros expelled him in 1809. DeForest went to Rio de Janeiro and after a short stay continued his exile in England. In London, he actively supported the South American independence movement, and acted as an intermediary for the patriot envoy Matias Irigoyen, assisting in the secret purchase of munitions. In 1811, he returned to the United States, married Julia Wooster, and sailed back to Buenos Aires in 1812.

He was promptly honored as an "adopted citizen" of the United Provinces. During the following years, he amassed a significant fortune as a "prince of privateers," outfitting ships under Buenos Aires commissions to harass Spanish commerce. In 1817, he expanded his business by founding the commercial house of Lynch, Zimmermann & Cia, which became a cornerstone of the regional arms trade.

=== Donations in Buenos Aires ===
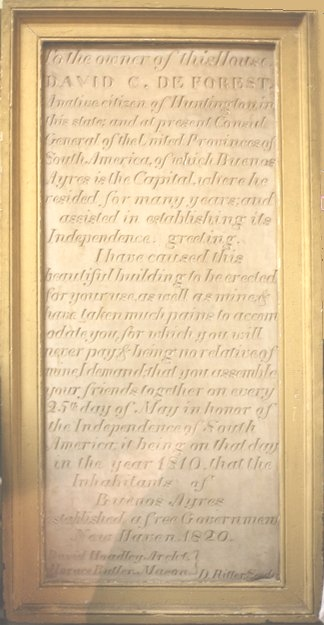
Marble tablet in the mansion built by DeForest on the north corner of Elm and Church Streets, New Haven. Requires occupants to celebrate "on every 25th day of May in honor of the Independence of South America: it being on that day in the year 1810, that the Inhabitants of Buenos Ayres established a free Government." "David C. DeForest, Consul General of the United Provinces of South America, of which Buenos Ayres is the Capital." 1820.

In November 1817, a few months before his return to the United States, DeForest made a lasting contribution to Argentine education. He donated to the state his "chacra" (country estate), a large property in the area then known as San Isidro (now, Vicente López), to endow a new college: the Academy of the Union of the South (a precursor to the University of Buenos Aires). The government accepted the gift, promising to establish a scholarship in his name and to hang DeForest's portrait (once available) in the halls of the academy. Two portraits (shown at right) were completed by 1823 by Samuel Morse - one is currently at the Yale University Art Gallery and the other was sent that same year to Buenos Aires, along with other gifts.

=== Diplomatic life ===
Upon his return to New Haven, Connecticut, in early 1818, DeForest served as the Consul General of the United Provinces. The U.S. government was then in secret negotiations about the territories of “Las Floridas”, and did not want to endanger those delicate discussions recognizing a colony of Spain. Thus, in the same way that it did not recognize Luis de Onís, the ambassador sent by Spain and residing in Philadelphia, the U.S. government held the recognition of DeForest, although he was assured by the Secretary of State, John Quincy Adams that he could “act in his official character as if he were received in due form,” as if officially recognized.

DeForest remained a tireless advocate for the patriot cause and continued his fight for the recognition of independence by contacting U.S. senators, in particular, Henry Clay. Once the Adams–Onís Treaty was signed with Spain, and while DeForest was still consul general, recognition of independence was finally granted in 1822 when Congress approved an appropriation to dispatch diplomatic missions to five new states (the United Provinces of the Río de la Plata, Chile, Peru, Colombia, and Mexico).

Returning to his native state of Connecticut, DeForest built a mansion facing the New Haven Green, and initiated annual public celebrations of the Twenty-Fifth of May (day of the first independent government in Buenos Aires, formed in 1810), complete with national salutes and patriotic toasts. A marble tablet was placed in the house with text to remind house owners of that occasion (see photo). On the other side of the tablet, biographical details of the family (David, Julia, and children) were inscribed.

=== Donations from the United States ===
In 1823, DeForest commissioned the renowned artist Samuel F. B. Morse to paint a series of portraits. One set, featuring DeForest in a blue riding suit and Julia in the yellow satin dress she wore to a White House reception on Christmas Day 1818, eventually became part of the collection at the Yale University Art Gallery. DeForest sent another, more formal Morse portrait of himself to the University of Buenos Aires, later donated to the Museo Nacional de Bellas Artes.

DeForest died in New Haven, Connecticut, on February 22, 1825.

=== Legacy ===
DeForest philanthropic legacy continued through a $5,000 gift to Yale University, which established the David C. DeForest Scholarships on "Debating and Public Speaking". The funds were given under the condition that they were to be held at 6% yearly until such time when they would produce an annual interest of $1,556. That amount would then be used for education of DeForest's assigns at the college ($1,000), maps and books for the library ($500), and a gold medal for oratory ($56). The prize is still awarded today.

DeForest's life remains a unique historical link between the revolutionary spirits of two continents.

== Bibliography ==
- Keen, Benjamin (1947). David Curtis DeForest and the Revolution of Buenos Aires. Yale University Press. ISSN 0084-3350.
- Letts de Epsil, Courtney (1944). Las Memorias y Cartas de David Curtis DeForest, Buenos Aires 1802-1818 [The Memories and Letters of David Curtis DeForest, Buenos Aires 1802-1818] (in Spanish). Yale University.
- Bemis, Samuel F. (1940). "Papers of David Curtis DeForest and J.W. DeForest". The Yale University Library Gazette. 14 (4): 62–63. JSTOR i40038363 – via JSTOR.
- Körner, Karl Wilhelm (1970). "Johann Christian Zimmermann: Ein Deutscher Unternehmer in Übersee". Tradition: Zeitschrift Für Firmengeschichte und Unternehmerbiographie (in German). 15 (6): 282–295. JSTOR 40697241 – via JSTOR.
