= Pedro Corrêa do Lago =

Brazilian art historian and curator

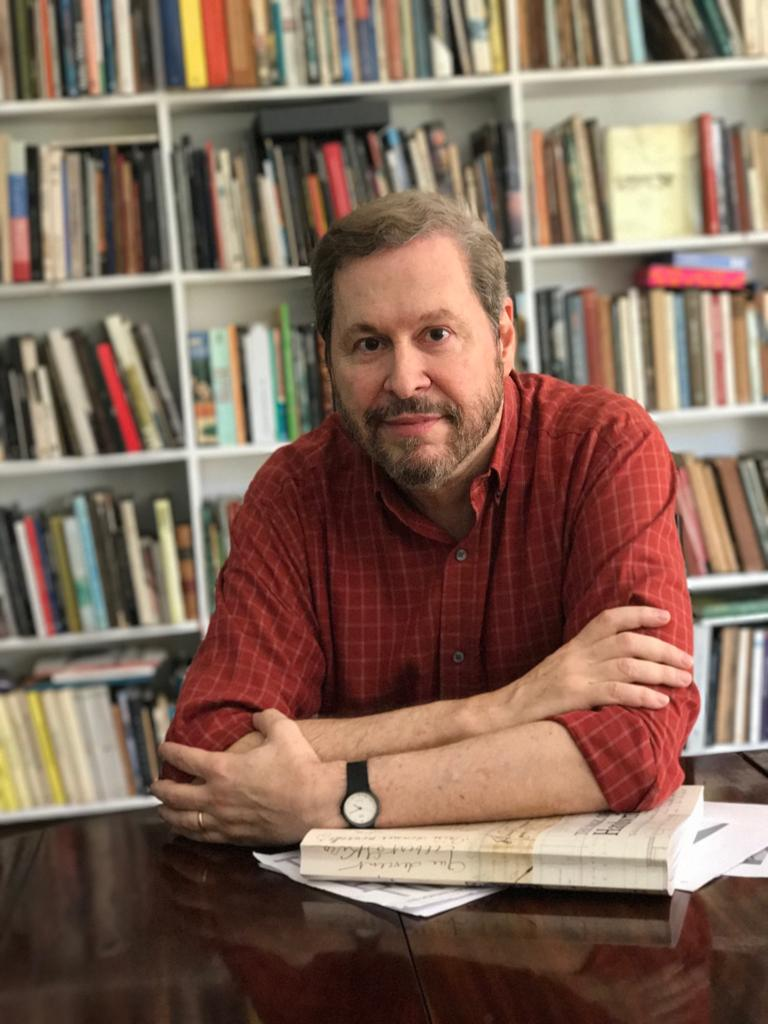
- Born: March 15, 1958 (age 68); Rio de Janeiro, Brazil
- Occupations: Curator; historian; publisher
- Spouse: Bia Corrêa do Lago

Pedro Corrêa do Lago (born March 15, 1958) is a Brazilian art historian and curator who has formed the largest private collection of autograph letters and manuscripts in the world today. He is the author of over twenty books on manuscripts and Brazilian art and was president of Brazil's National Library from 2003 to 2005. In 2002, partnering with his wife Bia Corrêa do Lago, he founded Capivara, an art publishing house specialized in catalogues raisonnés of artists active in Brazil. Since 2012 he has been a columnist for the monthly magazine Piaui.

== Life ==
The son of Brazilian diplomat Antonio Corrêa do Lago and grandson of leading statesman Oswaldo Aranha, Corrêa do Lago spent most of his early life accompanying his father in various postings in Europe and South America. He has a brother, Ambassador André Aranha Corrêa do Lago, who in 1990 married Beatrice Weiller, second cousin of King Felipe VI of Spain (for being the maternal great-granddaughter of King Alfonso XIII of Spain and great-great-great-granddaughter of Queen Victoria) and sister of Sibilla Weiller, wife of Prince Guillaume of Luxembourg. He holds a master's degree in economics from the Pontifical Catholic University of Rio de Janeiro and is fluent in five languages. From 1987 to 2003 he was an antiquarian bookseller in São Paulo and Sotheby's representative in that city from 1986 to 2012. He has also been active as a trustee of the São Paulo Biennale since 1992, and as a full member of Brazil's Historic and Geographic Institute (IHGB) since 2008. Corrêa do Lago has curated several exhibitions including The Distant View at the São Paulo Biennale in 2000, Frans Post, in Paris, at the Musée du Louvre, in 2005 and L’Empire Brésilien et ses Photographes at the Musée d’Orsay in 2005. He also curated the exhibit Brasiliana Itaú, on permanent display since 2014 in the Espaço Olavo Setubal at Itaú Cultural, in São Paulo.

== Manuscript collector ==
Starting in his early teens, Corrêa do Lago has gathered what is widely considered the largest private collection of autograph letters and manuscripts formed in the past 50 years. The subject of his 2003 book entitled True to the Letter (published in five languages), the collection has since grown to become the most comprehensive in the six areas focused on by Corrêa do Lago: art, literature, history, science, music and entertainment. Over a span of 45 years, he assembled tens of thousands of letters, documents, signed photographs and all sorts of manuscript items emanating from the four or five thousand figures he recognized as most prominent in these fields since 1500. Significant pieces from personalities such as Newton and Einstein, Mozart and Beethoven, Van Gogh and Picasso, Joyce and Proust, Henry VIII and Gandhi, Chaplin and Disney are present in the collection, which will be shown to the public for the first time from June to September, 2018, at The Morgan Library & Museum in New York when 130 selected items will be exhibited.

== Capivara Editions ==
With his wife Bia, in 2002 Corrêa do Lago founded Capivara, a publishing house specializing in Brazilian art. He is responsible for leading teams that have conducted the primary research on the most important foreign artists active in Brazil before the 20th century, including Frans Post and Jean Baptiste Debret. Many important paintings have been rediscovered or reattributed by Corrêa do Lago, who has also located and identified thousands of significant historical photographs and manuscript documents, including the earliest photograph of the Americas, by Hercule Florence. In 2008, the couple located with a noblewoman in Europe the lost photography collection of Princess Isabel, regent of Brazil, who went into exile in 1889, and revealed its one thousand images in a book published the following year. Corrêa do Lago was also the editor of Vik Muniz: Catalogue Raisonné, 1987–2015, which covers the entire output of Brazil's best-known contemporary artist (26).

== Brazil’s National Library ==
Invited by Culture Minister Gilberto Gil, Corrêa do Lago was president of Brazil's National Library (Biblioteca Nacional) from February 2003 to October 2005. While he was able to reorganize important services within the institution and create an influential monthly illustrated magazine on Brazilian history ''Revista de Historia da Biblioteca Nacional'' (in Portuguese), his tenure was marked by strong opposition by the leaders of the union of the library's employees, some of whom were deprived of irregular benefits granted by previous administrations, which were disallowed by Corrêa do Lago.

In mid 2005, during a three-month strike by the public servants of the Ministry of Culture (which forced the National Library to be closed during that entire period), a theft occurred of rare items including photographs, prints and drawings (which were later mostly recovered). This crime was perpetrated by a gang that has since been jailed and had pillaged several Brazilian cultural institutions in the early 2000s. At the empty National Library, they operated freely by bribing the security guards. These facts were still unknown at the time and were only uncovered in the following years. Speculation concerning security at the library intensified the union's opposition and eventually led to Corrêa do Lago's resignation in October 2005.

Legal proceedings were initiated by political opponents of Corrêa do Lago related to his term of office at the National Library, but he was cleared of all charges. Oriented by leading Brazilian historians that formed its editorial board, the illustrated history magazine founded by Corrêa do Lago, the Revista de Historia da Biblioteca Nacional, continued to be published for another eleven years after his departure, making Brazilian history accessible to millions in Brazil.

== Publications ==
A leading specialist in Brazilian iconography of the colonial and imperial periods, Corrêa do Lago has written 22 books and catalogues since 1996. These include the catalogues raisonnés of Frans Post (2006, with his wife Bia), Jean Baptiste Debret (2008, with Júlio Bandeira) and Nicolas-Antoine Taunay (2009). He also organized the two editions of Vik Muniz's catalogue raisonné (2009 and 2015), and encouraged and supervised the publication of other significant raisonnés including those of J. M. Rugendas (2010), A. J. Pallière (2011), and A. Eckhout (2010). He has furthermore published monographs on photographers (Militão, 2001) and on collections that he helped to form (Itaú Cultural, 2009), as well as a photobiography of his grandfather Oswaldo Aranha, to critical acclaim (2017).

== Private life ==
Pedro Corrêa do Lago has been married since 1994 to Maria Beatriz (Bia) Fonseca and has two stepsons. The daughter of Brazilian novelist Rubem Fonseca, Bia is the co-author of four books with her husband and for fifteen years hosted the leading literary show on Brazilian television ''Umas Palavras'' from 2001 to 2016. Currently a screenwriter, in 2017 she co-authored the telenovela (Tempo de Amar), shown on TV Globo.

== In popular culture ==
Corrêa do Lago is believed to have inspired the characters in two best-selling novels: the bookseller Miguel Solera de Lara in Jô Soares’s O Xangô de Baker Street (1995) and Paulo Ferreira da Lagoa in Codex 632 (2005) by Portuguese writer José Rodrigues dos Santos.
