= Bia Corrêa do Lago =

Brazilian writer, journalist and researcher

Maria Beatriz Fonseca Corrêa do Lago, better known as Bia Corrêa do Lago (Rio de Janeiro, April 3, 1958) is a Brazilian writer, journalist and researcher. She is the daughter of writer Rubem Fonseca, who was awarded the highest literary award in the Portuguese language – the Prêmio Camões – and is the author of numerous books, including Agosto, O Caso Morel, O Cobrador, and Bufo & Spallanzani.

== Biography ==
Bia Corrêa do Lago was born and lives in Rio de Janeiro. She holds a degree in psychology from PUC and has authored various texts about Frans Post and 19th-century photographers. Since 2001 she has written and hosted the show Umas Palavras produced by Canal Futura, where she interviews playwrights, novelists, filmmakers, composers, dramatists and other public figures who deal with the written language. In 2009, together with her husband, Pedro Corrêa do Lago, she won the highest award in Brazil for an art book – the Prêmio Jabuti – for Coleção Princesa Isabel - Fotografia do Século XIX. Names interviewed on her television program include Mario Vargas Llosa, Oscar Niemeyer, José Saramago, Rachel de Queiroz, Ferreira Gullar, Chico Buarque, Caetano Veloso, Salman Rushdie, Lygia Fagundes Telles, Millôr Fernandes and Gilberto Gil. In 2012 she published Umas Palavras - 15 entrevistas memoráveis, with compilations of interviews selected from the first ten years of her show. A television screenwriter, she co-authored the telenovela Tempo de Amar on TV Globo (Sept. 2017 – March 2018).

== Private life ==
Bia Corrêa do Lago is married since 1994 to Pedro Corrêa do Lago, a Brazilian author, publisher and art historian. She has two sons from a previous marriage.
