= Gofredo Teles Júnior =

Brazilian lawyer, jurist, and university professor

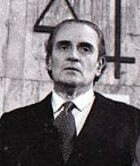
- Born: 16 May 1915; São Paulo
- Died: June 27, 2009 (aged 94)
- Spouse(s): Lygia Fagundes Telles

Goffredo Carlos da Silva Telles or, as he later adopted Gofredo da Silva Telles Júnior (May 16, 1915 - June 27, 2009) was a Brazilian lawyer, jurist, and university professor.

A professor at the University of São Paulo, he was Director and Vice-Director of the same institution, where he also organized courses in philosophy, general theory of the state, and postgraduate courses. He helped found the Brazilian Institute of Philosophy.

He participated in the elaboration of the 1946 Constitution, serving as a federal deputy until 1950.

== Life ==
Telles was born in São Paulo. He was the son of Gofredo Teixeira da Silva Teles and Carolina Penteado da Silva Teles and, through her, the maternal grandson of Inácio Leite Penteado and Olívia Guedes Penteado, uncles of the patroness Yolanda Penteado.

During the Constitutionalist Revolution of 1932, Gofredo Teles Júnior served as a volunteer in Guaratinguetá. At the time, his father was mayor of São Paulo. In 1933, he enrolled at the University of São Paulo Law School. Between 1932 and 1937, Gofredo Teles Júnior actively participated in the Ação Integralista Brasileira (AIB), together with his brother, Ignácio da Silva Teles. He was one of the main leaders of the Integralist Action in São Paulo. He traveled throughout the interior of São Paulo state spreading the Integralist doctrine. In 1934, he ran for the AIB in the National Constituent Assembly and was elected deputy. Having started an active public life, he interrupted it in 1937, with the Estado Novo coup d'état, to dedicate himself to law practice and studies. The following year he published Justiça e júri no Estado Moderno, defending an anti-liberal and anti-totalitarian state, in opposition to the worldwide Nazi trend.

He graduated in 1938, and married Elza Xavier da Silva in 1939. He was a law professor at the University of São Paulo Law School (USP), where he had been teaching since 1940, initially as a free lecturer, and later as a full professor. He took over the chair Introduction to Law Science in 1954, and was vice-director of the University of São Paulo Law School from 1966 to 1969, having held its board of directors in several periods.

In 1946, he was elected to the National Constituent Assembly through the Popular Representation Party, an integralist party association, presided over by Plínio Salgado. During the Constituent Assembly he was controversial. He dedicated himself especially to fighting communism and defending the increase of tax collection in the municipalities . In 1977 Telles was the main writer of the Letter to the Brazilians (Portuguese:Carta aos Brasileiros), in which jurists condemned the military dictatorship and called for the rule of law.

Telles's choice to write and read the letter was strategic, due to his lack of ties with the Left and his repudiation of Marxism, as an integralist. With widespread national repercussion, the Letter was featured throughout the Brazilian press and made front-page headlines in the world's main newspapers, and was translated into numerous languages. The following year, Institutional Act no. 5 was revoked, and the year after amnesty was granted to opponentes and military alike.

He taught for nearly 45 years. In 1985, by force of law, was compulsorily retired upon reaching seventy years old .Shortly after his retirement, and by the unanimous vote of the university council, he was honored with the title of "Professor Emeritus of the University of São Paulo".

On October 5, 1988, the date of the promulgation of the Federal Constitution, he created the Wednesday Circle (Círculo das Quartas-feiras), together with students Adriano Nunes Carrazza and Cássio Schubsky, who were later joined by other students from the Law School at USP. The Circle, as it became known, met weekly for years to debate legal, political, literary and historical topics, etc. The Wednesday Circle had an important political role, with measures such as the first collective writ of security in the country and the first demonstrations for the impeachment of the then President Fernando Collor de Mello.

== Death ==
Telles died of cachexia at his home on June 27, 2009, at the age of 94.

== Personal life ==
Telles was first married in 1939 to Elza Xavier da Silva (d. 1944). In 1947, he married writer Lygia Fagundes Telles, separating in 1960; they had a son, the filmmaker Gofredo Telles Neto. His third marriage was in 1967, to the lawyer Maria Eugênia Raposo da Silva Telles; they had a daughter, Olívia.

== Published books ==
- Justiça e júri no Estado Moderno (1938)
- A definição do Direito (1938)
- O sistema brasileiro de discriminação de rendas (1946)
- Dois problemas brasileiros: o algodão e o fio de seda (1948)
- Tratado da Consequência: curso de lógica formal (1949)
- A criação do Direito, vol. 1 (1953)
- A criação do Direito, vol. 2 (1958)
- Dissertação sobre o Universo (1961)
- A democracia e o Brasil (1965)
- A Filosofia do Direito, vol. 1 (1965)
- A Filosofia do Direito, vol. 2 (1967)
- O Direito Quântico (1971)
- A Constituição, a Assembleia Constituinte e o Congresso Nacional (1986)
- Ética (1988)
- A folha dobrada (1999)
- Iniciação na Ciência do Direito (2001)
- O Povo e o poder (2003)
- Palavras do amigo aos estudantes de Direito (2003)
- O que é a Filosofia do Direito? (2004)
- Estudos (2005)
- Três Discursos (2009)
- Doze Trabalhos: Caminhos do Brasil (2016; posthumous work)
