= Lygia Fagundes Telles =

Brazilian novelist and writer (1918–2022)

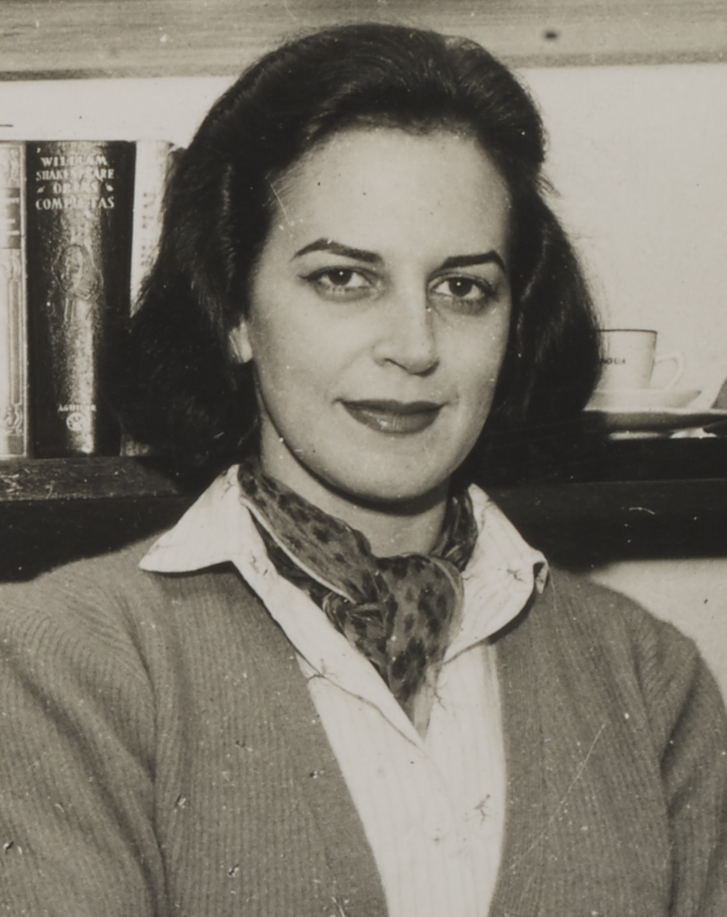
- Born: Lygia de Azevedo Fagundes; 19 April 1918; São Paulo, Brazil
- Died: 3 April 2022 (aged 103); São Paulo, Brazil
- Occupations: Novelist; writer
- Spouses: Gofredo Telles Júnior (m. 1947; sep. 1960) Paulo Emílio Salles Gomes (m. 1962; died 1977)
- Children: 1
- Writing career
- Language: Portuguese
- Notable works: Ciranda de Pedra (1955); Antes do Baile Verde (1970); As Meninas (1973)

Lygia Fagundes da Silva Telles (née de Azevedo Fagundes; Portuguese pronunciation: [ˈliʒiɐ faˈɡũdʒis ˈtɛlis]; 19 April 1918 – 3 April 2022), also known as "the lady of Brazilian literature" and "the greatest Brazilian writer" while alive, was a Brazilian novelist and writer, considered by academics, critics and readers to be one of the most important and notable Brazilian writers in the 20th century and the history of Brazilian literature. In addition to being a lawyer, Lygia was widely represented in postmodernism, and her works portrayed classic and universal themes such as death, love, fear and madness, as well as fantasy.

Born in São Paulo, and educated as a lawyer, she began publishing soon after she completed high school and simultaneously worked as a solicitor and writer throughout most of her career. She was elected as the third woman in the Brazilian Academy of Letters in 1985 and held Chair 16. She was a recipient of the Camões Prize, the highest literary award of the Portuguese language and her works have received honors and awards from Brazil, Chile and France. Winner of all important literary awards in Brazil, honored nationally and internationally, in 2016, at the age of 98, she became the first Brazilian woman to be nominated for the Nobel Prize for Literature.

== Early life ==
Lygia Fagundes was born on 19 April 1918 in São Paulo, Brazil, to Maria do Rosário da Silva Jardim de Moura and Durval de Azevedo Fagundes. Her father was an attorney and public prosecutor who also served as a district attorney, commissioner of police and a judge. Her mother, known as Zazita, was a pianist. Because of the nature of her father's work, the family moved often throughout the state, living at various times in Apiaí, Assis, Itatinga and Sertãozinho. When she was eight years old, Fagundes moved with her mother to Rio de Janeiro, where they remained for five years. Returning to São Paulo, she enrolled in Caetano de Campos School, and graduated in 1937. With proceeds from her father, in 1938, she published Porões e Sobrados (Grounds and Townhouses), a collection of short stories.

In 1939, Fagundes graduated with her pre-law and physical education degrees from the University of São Paulo (USP). In 1941, she enrolled in the Law School at USP (Portuguese: Faculdade de Direito do Largo de São Francisco) as one of only six women students in a class of over one hundred men. Simultaneously, she began working for the government, with the Secretary of Agriculture, as well as writing her second book of short stories, Praia Viva (Living Beach), which she published in 1944. The following year, she graduated with her law degree and in 1947, married her international law professor, Goffredo Telles Jr. The couple would have their only child, Goffredo da Silva Telles Neto in 1952.

== Career ==
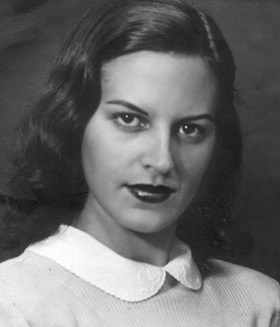
An early photograph of Telles, 1945

Telles continued to work in civil service and became a collaborator with A Manhã (The Morning), writing a weekly column for the journal located in Rio. In 1949 she received the Afonso Arinos award from the Brazilian Academy of Letters for O Cacto Vermelho (Red Cactus), a book of short stories. Among her most successful books is Ciranda de Pedra (The Marble Dance) (1954 reprinted in 1986), which deals with women's sexuality. Telles felt that it was the first work she had produced that marked her maturity as a writer, often criticizing her earlier works. In 1958, she published Histórias do Desencontro (Uncontrollable Stories) which won the prize of the National Book Institute. In 1960, Telles divorced, and the following year began working as a solicitor for the Institute of Providence (Portuguese: Instituto de Providência) of the State of São Paulo. She would work in this office and continue her publishing efforts simultaneously until 1991. In 1962, she married, the film critic and writer Paulo Emílio Salles Gomes, though as divorce was not technically recognized in Brazil at that time, their partnership was considered socially unacceptable.

Telles continued writing in the following decades, such works as: Verão no Aquário (Summer at the Aquarium, 1963), which won the Jabuti Prize in 1965; Capitu (1967, published 1993) a cinematic script co-written with her husband Gomes based upon Machado de Assis' work Dom Casmurro, which won the Candango Award for best screenplay in 1969; Antes do Baile Verde (Before the Green Ball, 1970), which won the Best Foreign Women Writers Grand Prix in Cannes (France) in 1969; As Meninas (The Girls, 1973; The Girl in the Photograph, 2012), which received multiple awards, including the Jabuti Prize, the Coelho Neto Prize of the Brazilian Academy of Letters and the Best Fiction Award from the São Paulo Association of Art Critics; Seminário dos Ratos (Seminary of the Rats, 1977), which would win the award for best short story from the Pen Club of Brazil that same year; A Disciplina do Amor (The Discipline of Love, 1980), which won her another Jabuti Prize, as well as the São Paulo Association of Art Critics Award; and As Horas Nuas, (Naked Hours, 1989), which won the "Book of the Year" and was honored with the Prêmio Pedro Nava.

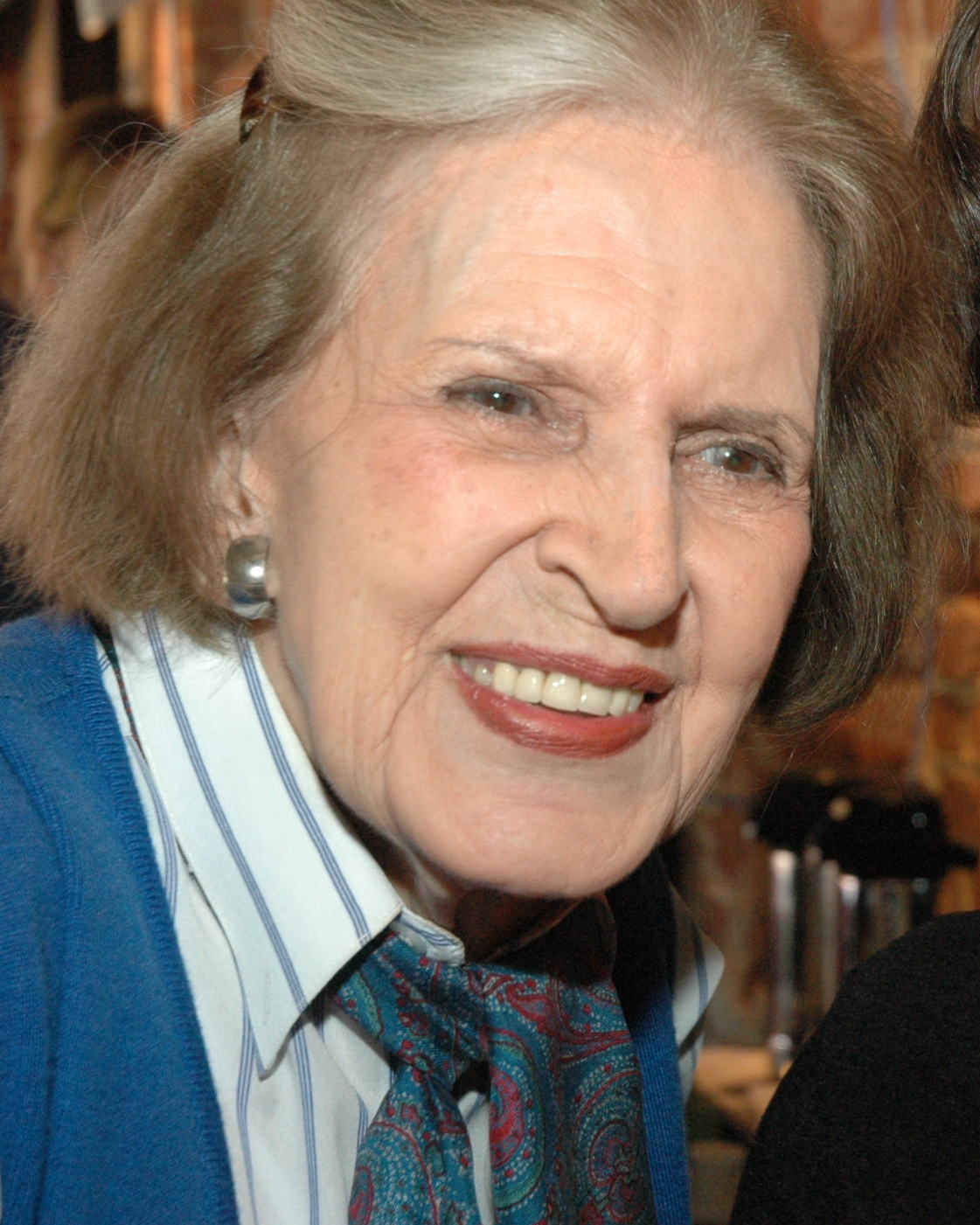
Telles in 2011

Telles' most acclaimed novel, As Meninas, tells the story of three young women in the early 1970s, a difficult time in the political history of Brazil due to the repression by the military dictatorship. She was among intellectuals who went to Brasília in 1977, to deliver the Manifesto of the Thousand (Portuguese: Manifesto dos Mil). The protest was the largest demonstration of intellectuals since the press censorship instituted by president/dictator Emílio Garrastazu Médici began in 1968. She led the delegation, composed of historian Hélio Silva and the writers Nélida Piñon and Jefferson Ribeiro de Andrade to present the signed petition to Armando Falcão, the Justice Minister in the cabinet of President Ernesto Geisel. Later that same year, her husband, Gomes would die. On 24 October 1985, Telles was elected to hold Chair 16, of the Brazilian Academy of Letters, the third woman ever to be elected to a chair. After her retirement from the Institute of Providence in 1991, she continued publishing works such as A Noite Escura e Mais Eu (The Dark Night and More Me, 1995), which won the Arthur Azevedo Prize from the National Library of Brazil; Oito contos de amor (Eight Tales of Love, 1996); Invenção e Memória (Invention and Memory, 2001), which earned her the Jabuti Prize, a parallel honor as Book of the Year, and the Grand Prize of the Critic of the Best of 2000 from the São Paulo Association of Art Critics; Durante Aquele Estranho Chá (During the Strange Tea, 2002); Conspiração de Nuvens (Cloud Compromise, 2007), which won the São Paulo Association of Art Critics Prize; and Passaporte para a China (Passport to China, 2011).

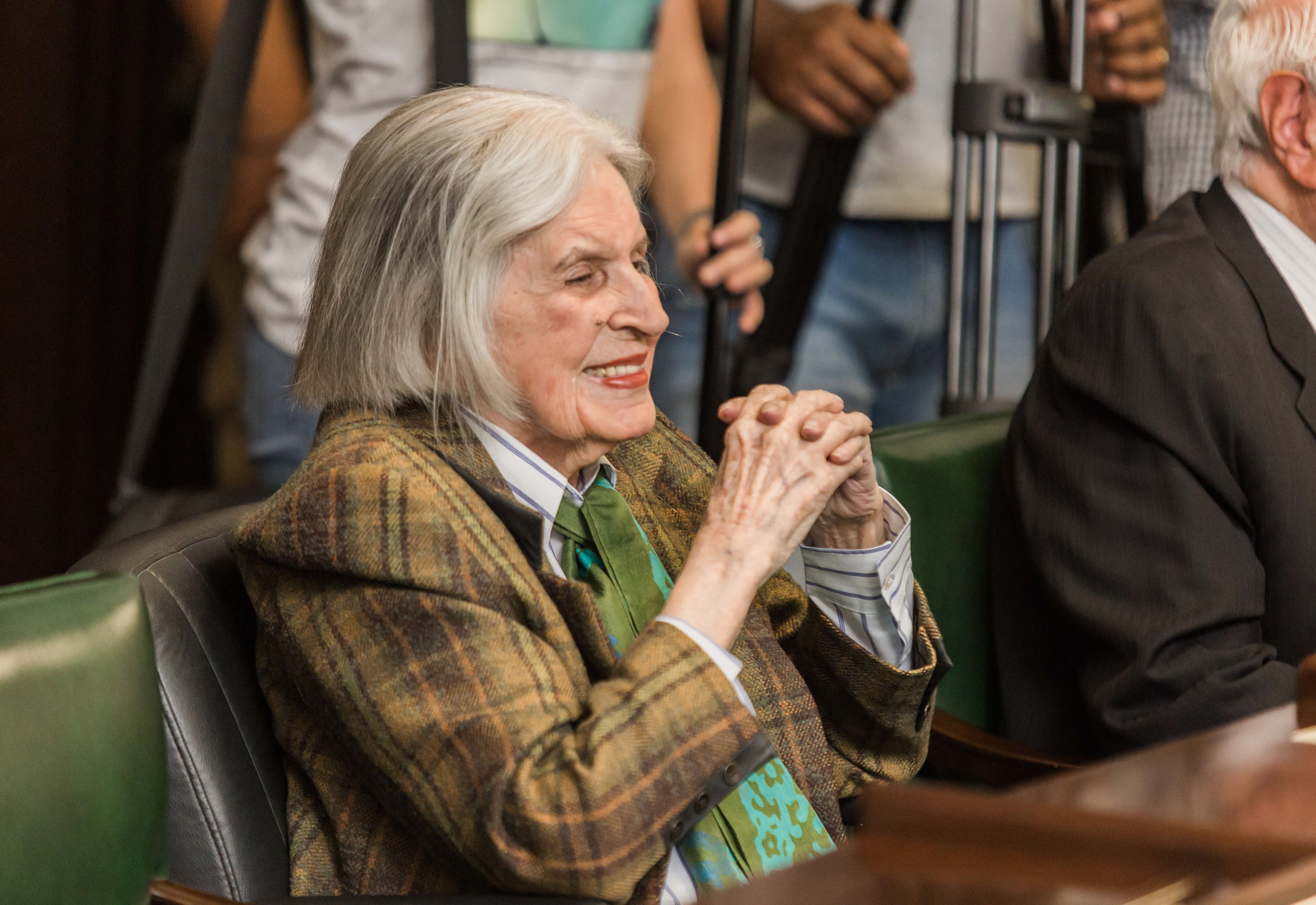
Telles in 2017

In 1985, Telles was honored as a commander in the Order of Rio Branco by the government of Brazil. In 1998, she was awarded the French Ordre des Arts et des Lettres in the grade of chevalier and was honored as a grand officer of the Gabriela Mistral Order of Educational and Cultural Merit from Chile. In 2005 Telles won the Camões Prize, the highest literary award of the Portuguese language for her body of work. As of 2013, she was one of the four female members of the Brazilian Academy of Letters. Her books have been translated into Czech, English, French, German, Italian, Polish, Spanish, Swedish, and been reprinted in multiple editions in Portuguese. She was nominated for the 2016 Nobel Prize in Literature by the Brazilian Writers' Union.

== Death ==
Telles died on 3 April 2022 in São Paulo from natural causes, aged 103. A public wake was held at the Academia Paulista de Letras and her body was cremated the following day at Vila Alpina Cemetery in São Paulo. Governor of São Paulo Rodrigo Garcia declared three days of mourning in the state.

== See also ==
- Brazilian literature
- Before the Green Ball

Academic offices
Preceded by Pedro Calmon	4th Academic of the 16th chair of the Brazilian Academy of Letters; 1987–2022	Vacant
