= Militão =

Militão can be a masculine given name, a middle name, or a surname. Notable people with the name include:

- Militão Augusto de Azevedo, Brazilian photographer and actor
- Militão Ribeiro, Portuguese communist
- Guilherme Militão de Oliveira Ruck Veja (born 2009), Brazilian football midfielder
- Éder Militão (born 1998), Brazilian football centre-back
