= Before the Green Ball =

Brazilian novel by Lygia Fagundes Telles

Antes do Baile Verde
- Author: Lygia Fagundes Telles
- Language: Portuguese
- Publisher: Bloch
- Publication date: 1970
- Publication place: Brazil
- ISBN: 9788532508805

Antes do Baile Verde (Before the Green Ball) is a Brazilian short story written by Lygia Fagundes Telles and originally published by Editora Bloch in 1970. It is considered one of the most important publications by the author, who began her career in the 1970s. The book brings together contemporary realist short stories of an intimate nature, reflecting characteristics of the third modernist generation and Concretism.

Composed of eighteen short stories, written between 1949 and 1969, the book deals with themes such as adultery, marital dissatisfaction, madness, and the demystification of family roles, with characters from middle-class urban Brazilian families who hide dramas and conflicts. Before the Green Ball was distributed under Emílio Garrastazu Médici, during the military dictatorship, and soon after it was published it won the International Women's Grand Prize for Foreign Short Stories.

Her short story work consolidated her career, earning her the Guimarães Rosa Prize in 1972 and the Coelho Neto Prize in 1973. In addition to this, other short stories by Lygia enabled her to be chosen for chair number sixteen of the Brazilian Academy of Letters, founded by Machado de Assis. In 1993, O Moço do Saxofone, one of the stories in Antes do Baile Verde, was adapted for television in an episode of the series Retrato de Mulher.

== Background and context ==
=== Literary scope ===
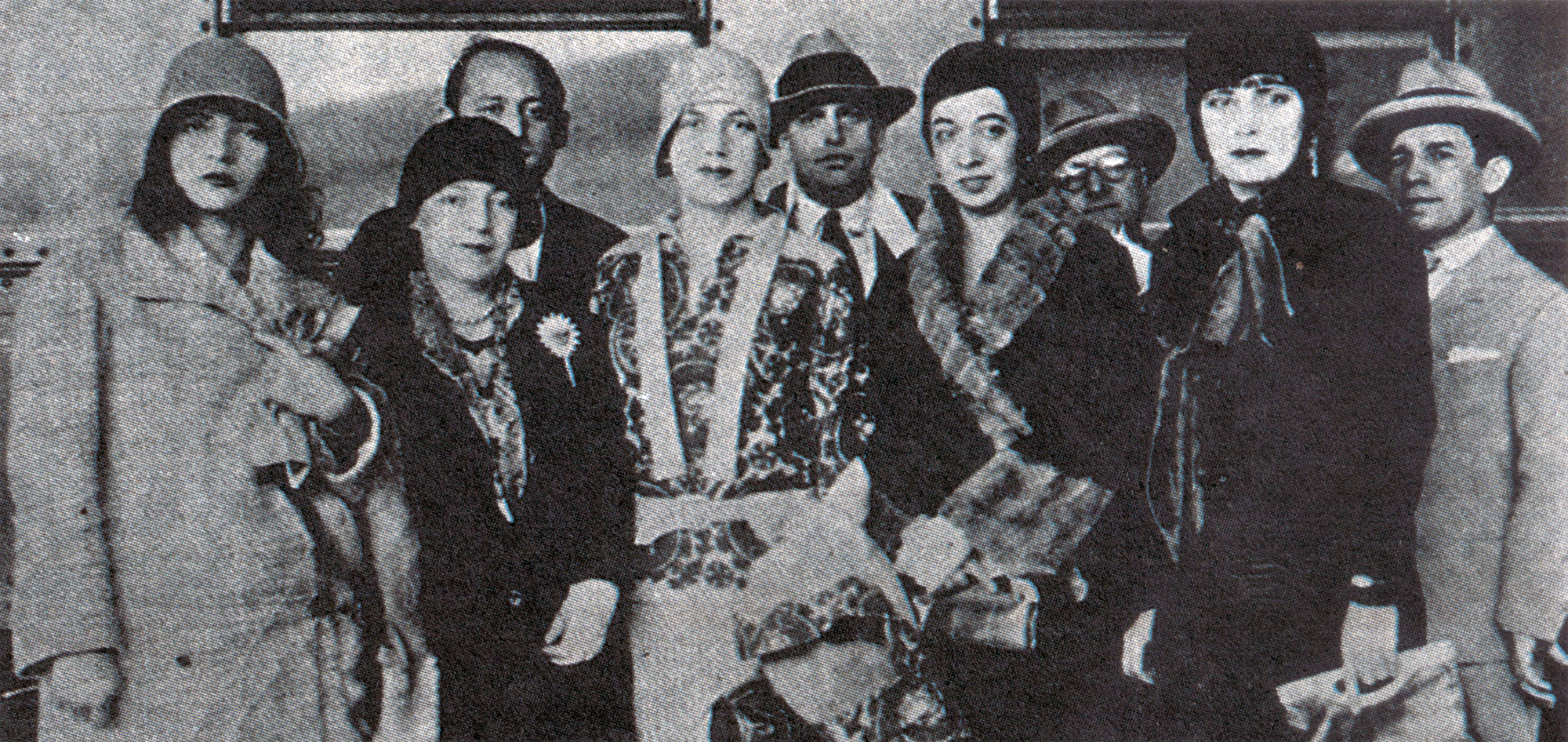
Main exponents of the Modern Art Week (1922).

Modernism in Brazil began with the Modern Art Week in 1922. One of its characteristics was the abandonment of past perspectives and formal freedom, bringing speech and writing closer together, even in the first generation, in which Oswald de Andrade, Mário de Andrade and Manuel Bandeira stood out. The existential concern of man in the world and his social relations gained ground in Brazilian literary production, clearly seen in the second modernist phase, in which Carlos Drummond de Andrade, Vinicius de Moraes, Cecília Meireles, Graciliano Ramos, Jorge Amado and Rachel de Queiroz, for example, reflected on the socio-political context of the time.

The socio-political scenario led to an even more explicit change in literature from 1945 onwards when the third generation began. João Cabral de Melo Neto published Morte e vida severina, a poetic work that criticized land concentration. In poetry, Concretism also stood out, an artistic movement that broke with lyricism and began to extend the meaning of poems to the typographic arrangement of words. Décio Pignatari and the brothers Augusto de Campos and Haroldo de Campos were some of the exponents of this movement.

Ferreira Gullar also took part in the concretist movement, but expanded the meanings of his poems through an engaged exposition in his texts. At the same time, Guimarães Rosa wrote Grande Sertão: Veredas, a work that gives voice to the sertanejo and describes, in monologue, the long journey of jagunços through Minas Gerais, Goiás and Bahia. Another post-modern writer, Clarice Lispector, exposed a recurring structure in her prose that would lead to the production of short stories: a character is in a routine condition and is disturbed by an event; some external element makes her return to normality (epiphany) and, with this, she "discovers" her true identity. The intimate poetry, stream of consciousness and feminine introspection also used by Lispector were used by Lygia Fagundes Telles throughout her literary career.

=== Social sphere ===
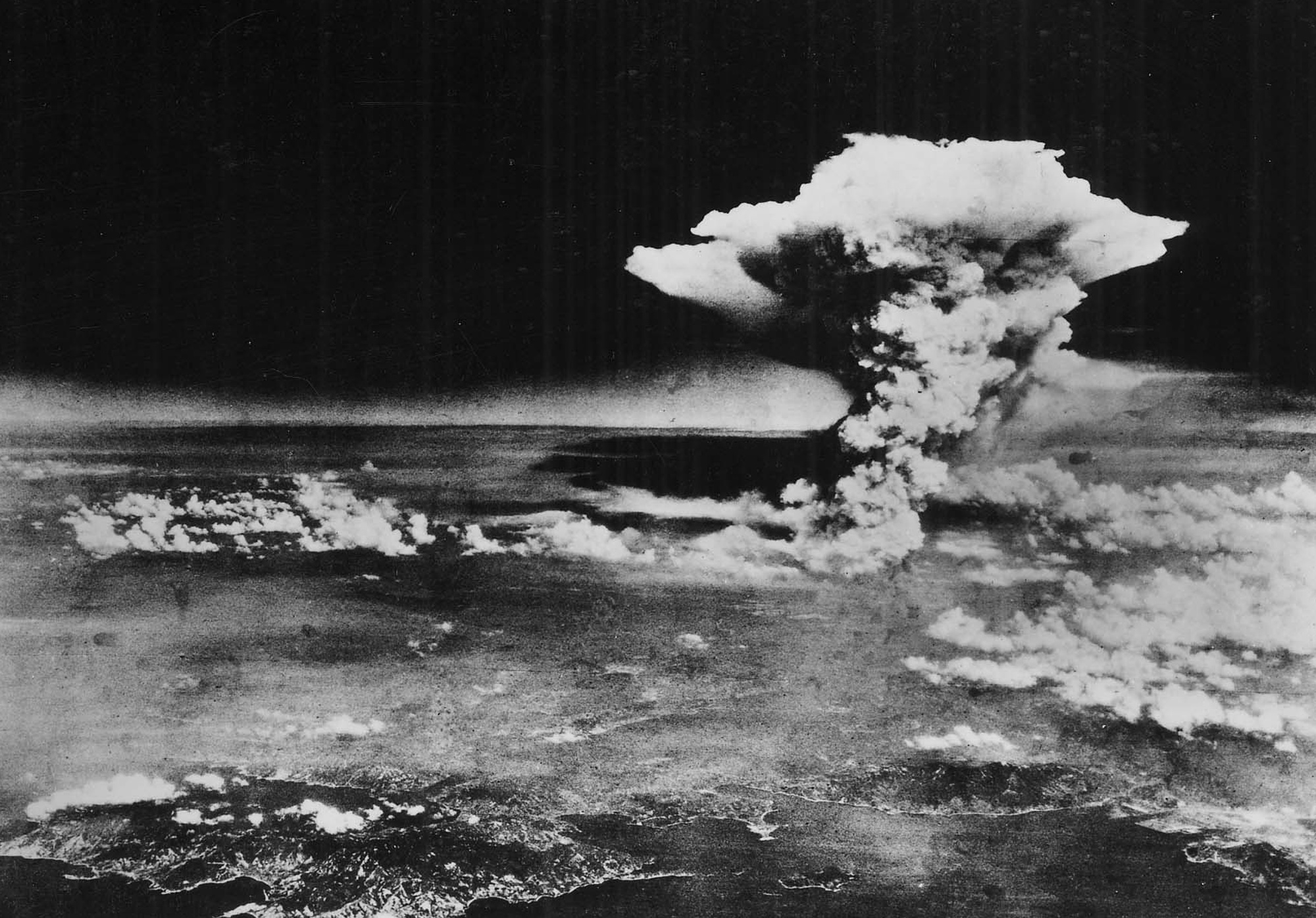
Hiroshima's atomic cloud. In literature, the poem Rosa de Hiroshima, by Vinicius de Moraes, had an impact.

After the end of the World War II (1939–1945), the European continent began a gradual process of reconstruction during human destruction. Existentialist philosophy, therefore, stood out as an analysis of individual issues, especially with the start of the Cold War, which divided the world into two blocs: capitalist (led by the United States) and socialist (led by the Soviet Union). In Brazil, Getúlio Vargas resigned in 1945, after fifteen years in power, and then Eurico Gaspar Dutra won the elections, initiating a developmental policy in the country, on the side of the capitalist bloc. In 1951, Vargas returned to power democratically, but his term did not end because he committed suicide in 1954, in the face of scandals involving his name in the Tonelero Street bombing. In 1955, Juscelino Kubitschek proposed accelerated industrial growth and consequent urban growth; in 1960, Jânio Quadros was elected president, but resigned after controversy over his plans. With Quadros' resignation, his vice-president João Goulart took office and sought to implement left-wing policies.

The cultural scene reflected the changes that had taken place in society, especially the movement of people from the countryside to the city. The Teatro Brasileiro de Comédia (Brazilian Comedy Theater) was created in São Paulo, which revealed numerous actors (such as Grande Otelo, Dercy Gonçalves and Tônia Carrero); its repercussions led to the creation of the Companhia Cinematográfica Vera Cruz (Vera Cruz Film Company), a pioneer in Brazilian film production. Still in the media context, television, broadcast by Assis Chateaubriand in 1950, impressed the population and changed the country's artistic production.

The concept of "post-modernity" directed the focus of art towards human and social relations, due to the spread of the concepts of social class, ideology and egalitarianism. A new literary vision was further intensified by the counter-revolution, called for by conservative sectors of the Catholic Church, influential politicians, landowners, the industrial bourgeoisie and part of the middle class, by the Armed Forces to remove Goulart from power and establish what would become the military dictatorship, which began with the coup of 1964. As a response to the fierce censorship, marginal poetry and intimate-existentialist prose spread, including Antes do Baile Verde, by Lygia Fagundes Telles.

== Features ==
=== Structure ===
Before the Green Ball is not subdivided into chapters or smaller parts; only the eighteen stories are inserted. In the original edition, they are presented respectively: The Objects, Green Yellow Lizard, Only a Saxophone, Helga, The Saxophone Boy, Before the Green Ball, The Hunt, The Key, Midnight in Shanghai, The Window, A Very Strong Tea and Three Cups, The Wild Garden, Christmas on the Barge, The Supper, Come See the Sunset, I Was Dumb and Alone, The Pearls and The Boy.

The original version also contains a letter written by Carlos Drummond de Andrade to Lygia Fagundes Telles in 1966:

Rio de Janeiro, January 28, 1966. Dear Lygia : [...] The book is perfect as a unity in variety, the hand is sure and knows how to suggest the deep story under the apparent story. Even a story set in China manages to work, without getting lost in exoticism or journalism. Its great strength seems to lie in the psychologizing hidden beneath the mass of realistic elements, which anyone can assimilate. Anyone who wants to know the underground truth of the creatures, which social behavior disguises, will find it wonderfully captured behind the story. Bringing the two sides together, overlapping, is the art of the best kind. You've done it. So different from the nonsense of those short story writers who celebrate themselves in newspapers and magazines and we read and forget what they've written! Your story resonates in our memory, imperative. Goodbye, dear friend. I wish you a peaceful, very Virgilian vacation.

— Letter from Carlos Drummond de Andrade.

=== Language ===
The symbolism of the color green recurs in Before the Green Ball. Sometimes it represents life, sometimes death. Sometimes it alludes to hope, envy, and money.

The language of Antes do Baile Verde changes according to the theme of each story. In general, there is an engaged tone as a veiled denunciation of social inequality and opposition to the military regime in Brazil; the widespread presence of free indirect speech to emphasize the psychological analysis made of the characters and the use of numerous figures of speech, such as metaphor, personification, and sarcasm.

Synesthesia is one of the main figures of speech used in Telles' short stories: the color green is constantly cited as a reference to the passage from life to death. Linguistic variations are also used to represent the characters portrayed according to their social level and the communication situation. Two other striking features of Lygia's literature are ambiguity and irony, also present in Ciranda de Pedra (1954) and As Meninas (1973), in which the writer establishes the internal conflicts of a man living in society.

=== Style and theme ===
Chronologically, Lygia Fagundes Telles belongs to the modernist generation of 1945, alongside Guimarães Rosa, Clarice Lispector, Rubem Braga and Dalton Trevisan; therefore, there is an influence of stream of consciousness and epiphany, resources used by these writers. The author's short stories also reflect the style of Edgar Allan Poe, a romantic American writer. In addition, there is a great deal of space for female figures in her works, with hatred, jealousy, and loneliness as recurring themes. The writer constructs a feminine perspective on reality and the human inner world. In general, her characters are restless and vulnerable beings, instruments of psychological reflection, who move about in apparent spontaneity, as an ironic representation of society.

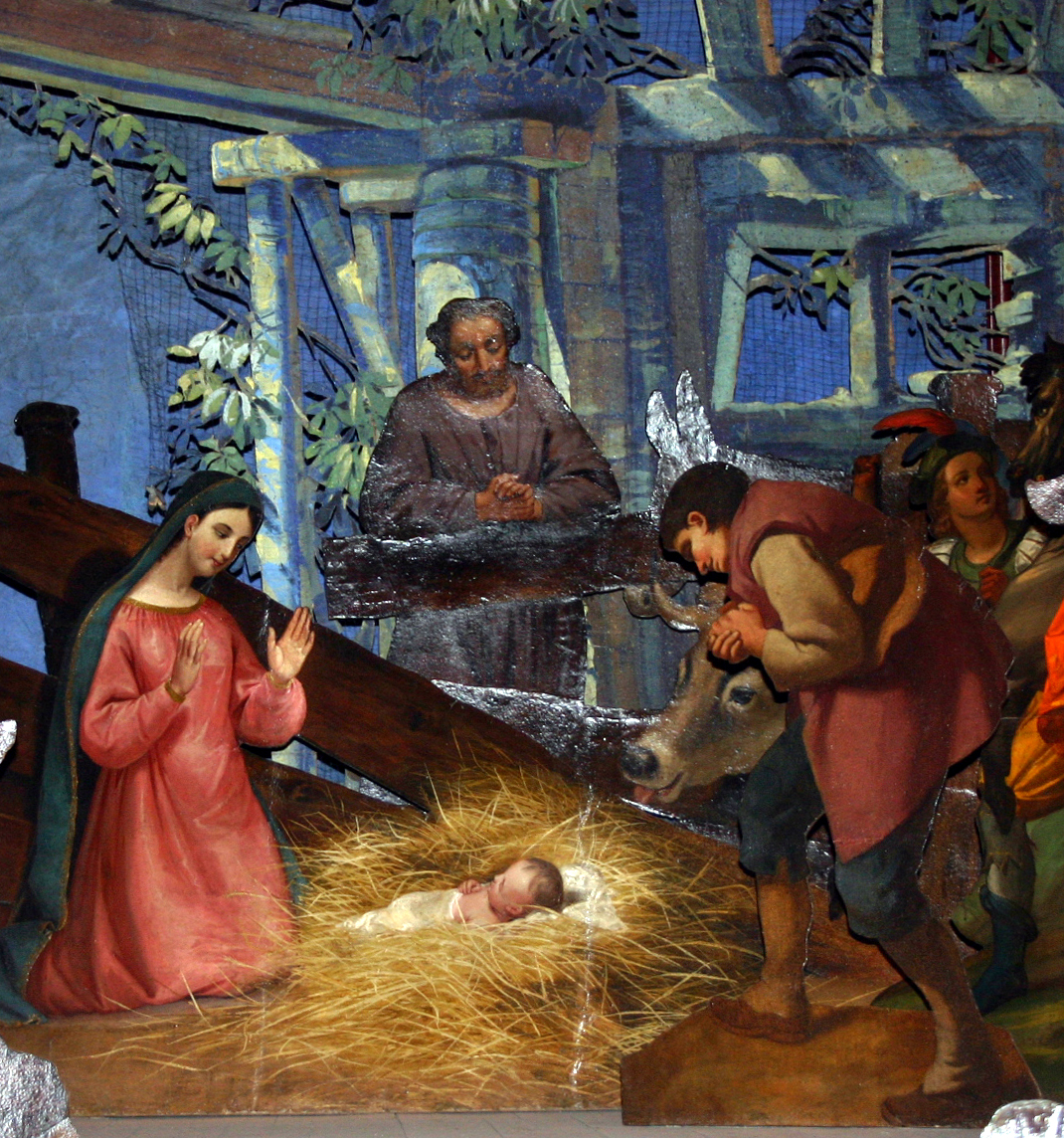
Nativity scene (1750), by Francesco Londonio. The birth of Jesus is metaphorized in Christmas on the Barca

The focus of his short stories is not so much on the action and movement of the characters, but rather on human questions, which are implicitly questioned to explore the internal conflicts of man in society. The personalities shown in the texts of Antes do Baile Verde are intimate, psychologically introspective, and strongly individualized, to construct an identity that produces a real effect.

Among the most popular stories in the book, The Objects exposes a conflict between a couple with a frayed relationship, in which the wife shows no interest in the affairs of her husband, who is emotionally unbalanced; Only a Saxophone tells the monologue of a selfish prostitute who never forgets a saxophone player; Before the Green Ball shows the selfishness of a daughter who would rather go to the ball than take care of her sick father; The Hunt expresses a man's fantastic adventure in front of a tapestry; Christmas on the Ferryboat promotes a biblical intertext with the birth of Jesus; and Come See the Sunset narrates a dialogue, in a tone of mystery, between ex-boyfriends who meet in a cemetery at dusk.

Of the eighteen stories, only two feature exclusively male characters: Verde Lagarto Amarelo and A Caçada. On the other hand, seven of them feature exclusively female characters, demonstrating that Lygia focuses more on the personality of women in society. In addition, almost all the stories have an ending without an explicit ending.

== Reception ==
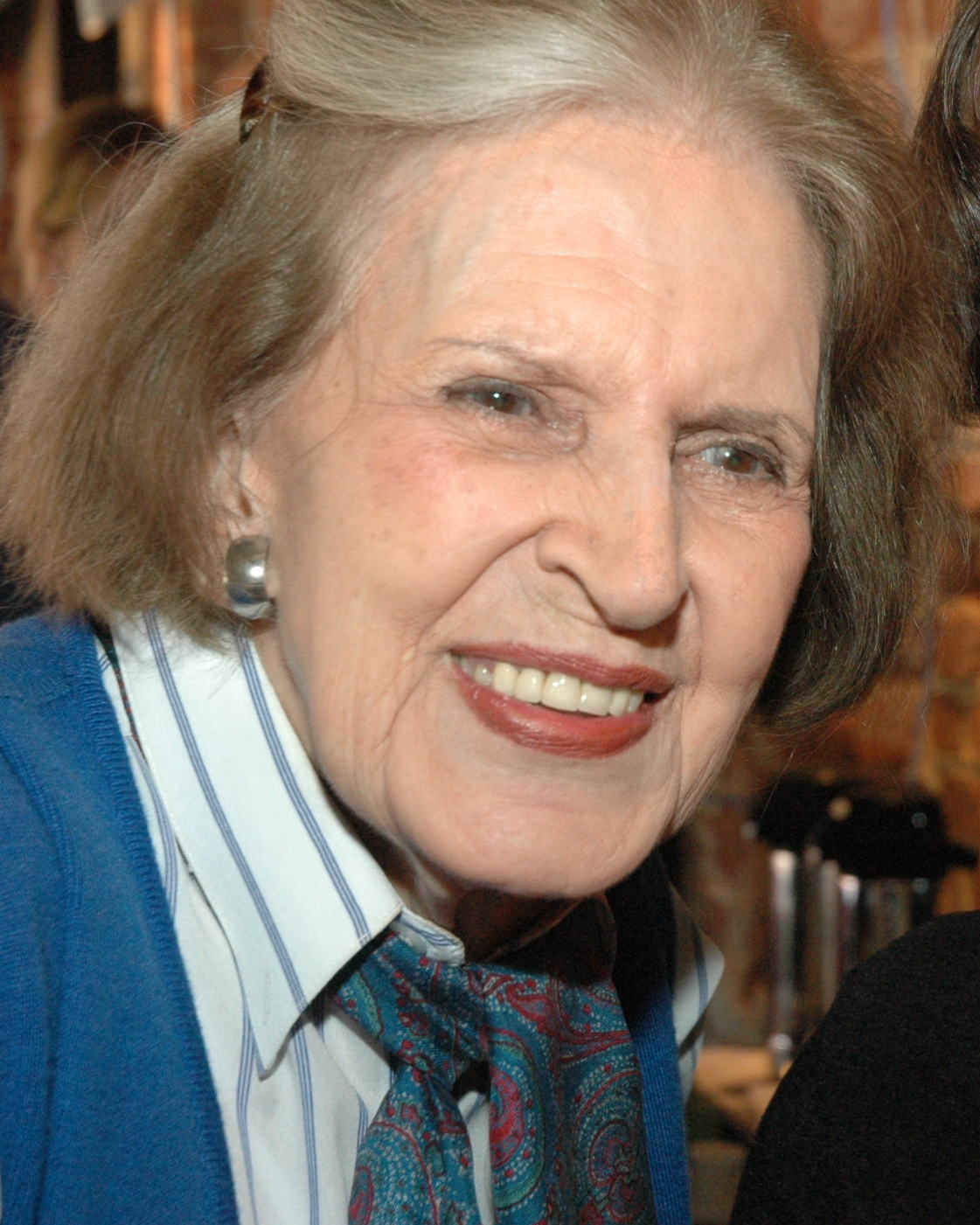
Lygia Fagundes Telles, 2011.

The book, published in 1970, received numerous positive reviews. The writer Caio Fernando Abreu said, in Before the Green Ball, that Lygia Fagundes Telles "[is] basically a storyteller, in the best and broadest meaning of the expression". Literary critic Suênio Campos de Lucena classifies the characters into three categories: "characters who want to forget, but can't; characters who would like to remember; and characters who remember nostalgically; it is also possible to think of a fourth category: those who remember painfully. The memory of pain and rejection is dominant in the writer's texts, which work with this tension between remembering and forgetting. The characters, almost always disintegrated/corrupted by stressful family relationships or by society itself, find themselves dealing with memories they wanted to forget, with their fragmented experiences, a past that torments them, a reminiscing that never stops".

Professor and essayist Silviano Santiago says that "a short and succinct definition of Lygia's short stories would say that their most salient characteristic is the difficulty human beings have in establishing bonds". The reviewer and critic Paulo Rónai also gave a favorable opinion of the eighteen short stories in Antes do Baile Verde: "these masterpieces, of such deep intimate restlessness and which exude such profound despair, gain the classic serenity of definitive art forms". Antonio Candido, professor at the Faculty of Philosophy, Letters and Human Sciences at the University of São Paulo, pointed out that "Lygia has always had the high merit of obtaining, in the novel and the short story, the clarity appropriate to a vision that penetrates and reveals, without resorting to any trickery or heavy-handedness in language or characterization".

== Publications ==
=== Editions ===
Originally published in the Estória Collection by Editora Bloch in 1970 in Rio de Janeiro, Antes do Baile Verde is a 237-page collection of short stories written by Lygia Fagundes Telles between 1949 and 1969. Basically, the narratives in the book were written in São Paulo and Águas de São Pedro. Shortly after its release, it was awarded the International Women's Grand Prize for Foreigners in France.

Other publishers distributed Lygia's work keeping the full text: Círculo do Livro in 1971; Livraria José Olympio Editora in 1983; Nova Fronteira in 1986; Editora Rocco in 2008 and Companhia das Letras on April 23, 2009. Later editions were published with changes in line with the 1990 Orthographic Agreement.

=== In other countries ===
Antes do Baile Verde was published in its original language in Portugal by Livros do Brasil. The short stories As Pérolas (Pearls) and A Chave (The Key) were translated into Italian and Polish, respectively, in works featuring Brazilian narratives. The entire book was published in France and the Czech Republic under the titles Un Thé bien fort et trois tasses and Pred zelenym bálem.

Year	Country	Language	Title	Translators	Publisher
1961	Italy	Italian	Le più belle novelle di tutti paesi	Domenico Porzio	Milan: Aldo Martello
1971	Portugal	Portuguese	Antes do Baile Verde	–	Lisbon: Livros do Brasil
1977	Poland	Polish	Opowiadania brazylijskie	Janina Klawe	Kraków: Wydawnictwo Literackie
1984	Czech Republic	Czech	Pred zelenym bálem	Pavla Lidmilová	Prague: Odeon
1989	France	French	Un Thé bien fort et trois tasses	Maryvonne Lapouge-Petorelli	Paris: Alinea
1995	France	French	Un Thé bien fort et trois tasses	Maryvonne Lapouge-Petorelli	Paris: Le serpent à plumes

== Adaptations ==
The only short story adapted from Before the Green Ball was The Saxophone Boy, which tells the story of a chauffeur who takes up residence in a boarding house, where he is disturbed by the indigestible food, some dwarves who are also staying there and a sad saxophone song. The protagonist therefore sets out to find out who the saxophone player is. With its strong introspective character, the text was staged in the episode "Once Upon a Time... Valdete", from the series Retrato de Mulher, shown on Rede Globo in 1993.

== See also ==
- Lygia Fagundes Telles
- Modernism in Brazil
- Modern Art Week

== Bibliography ==
- Lamas, Berenice (2004). O duplo em Lygia Fagundes Telles: um estudo em literatura e psicologia. Editora da Pontifícia Universidade Católica do Rio Grande do Sul. ISBN 9788574304397.
- Tietzmann, Vera (1992). A ficção intertextual de Lygia Fagundes Telles. Editora da Universidade Federal de Goiás. ISBN 9788531403811.
- Calixto, Lisandro Demetrius (2000). Livros obrigatórios do Vestibular. Clube dos Autores.
- Bosi, Alfredo (1994). História concisa da literatura brasileira. Cultrix. ISBN 9788531601897.
- Carrozza, Elza (1992). A configuração do relacionamento homem-mulher. Hucitec. ISBN 9788527101974.
- Santiago, Silviano (2006). Ora (direis) puxar conversa!. Editora da Universidade Federal de Minas Gerais. ISBN 9788570414625.
- Quint, Anne-Marie (1995). Modèles et innovations: études de littérature portugaise et brésilienne. Sorbonne Nouvelle. ISBN 9782878540994.
- Telles, Lygia Fagundes (2009). Antes do Baile Verde. Companhia das Letras. ISBN 9788516039844.
