= Recurso de amparo =

"Appeal for protection"; legal remedy in many Spanish-speaking countries

In most legal systems of the Spanish-speaking world, the writ of amparo ("writ of protection"; also called recurso de amparo, "appeal for protection", or juicio de amparo, "judgement for protection") is a remedy for the protection of constitutional rights, found in certain jurisdictions. The amparo remedy or action is an effective and inexpensive instrument for the protection of individual rights. The equivalent in U.S. courts is a stay of execution.

Amparo, generally granted by a supreme or constitutional court, serves a dual protective purpose: it protects the citizen and their basic guarantees, and protects the constitution itself by ensuring that its principles are not violated by statutes or actions of the state that undermine the basic rights enshrined therein. It resembles, in some respects, constitutional remedies such as the tutela available in Colombia, the writ of security (Mandado de Segurança) in Brazil and the constitutional complaint (Verfassungsbeschwerde) procedure found in Germany.

In many countries, an amparo action is intended to protect all rights that are not protected specifically by the constitution or by a special law with constitutional rank, such as the right to physical liberty, which may be protected instead by habeas corpus remedies. Thus, in the same way that habeas corpus guarantees physical freedom, and the "habeas data" protects the right of maintaining the integrity of one's personal information, the amparo protects other basic rights. It may therefore be invoked by any person who believes that any of his rights, implicitly or explicitly protected by the constitution, another law (or by applicable international treaties), is being violated.

== Origins in Mexico ==
The Mexican amparo has inspired many and served as a model in other judicatures. In the Philippines, Chief Justice Reynato Puno noted that the model for amparo used there was borrowed from Mexico: the writ of amparo is a Mexican legal procedure to protect human rights. Amparo literally means "protection" in Spanish. De Tocqueville's Democracy in America became available in Mexico in 1837, and its description of judicial review practice in the U.S. appealed to many Mexican jurists. Mexican justice Manuel Crescencio Rejón, drafted a constitutional provision for his native state, Yucatán (threatening independence from Mexico), which empowered jurists to protect all persons in the enjoyment of their constitutional and legal rights. This was incorporated in 1847 into the national constitution. The great writ proliferated in the Western Hemisphere, slowly evolving into various fora. Amparo became, in the words of a Mexican Federal Supreme Court Justice, Mexico’s “task of conveying to the world's legal heritage that institution which, as a shield of human dignity, her own painful history conceived.”

Amparo's evolution and metamorphosis had been witnessed, for several purposes: "(1) amparo de libertad for the protection of personal freedom, equivalent to the habeas corpus writ; (2) amparo contra leyes for the judicial review of the constitutionality of statutes; (3) amparo-casación for the judicial review of the constitutionality and legality of a judicial decision; (4) amparo administrativo for the judicial review of administrative actions; and (5) amparo agrario ejidal o comunal for the protection of peasants’ rights derived from the agrarian reform process."

Mexico's "recurso de amparo" is found in Articles 103 and 107 of the Mexican Constitution —the judicial review of governmental action—to empower state courts to protect individuals against state abuses. Amparo was sub-divided into five legal departments:

(a) the Liberty Amparo (amparo de libertad)
(b) the Constitutionality Amparo (amparo contra leyes)
(c) the Judicial or “Cassation” Amparo, aimed at the constitutionality of a judicial interpretation
(d) the Administrative Amparo (amparo como contencioso-administrativo); and
(e) the Agrarian Amparo (amparo en materia agraria, ejidal y comunal).

== Extension to Latin America ==
Amparo was also legally enshrined in Latin American legal systems. It is now an extraordinary legal remedy in Bolivia, Chile, Costa Rica, Ecuador, El Salvador, Guatemala, Honduras, Nicaragua, Panama, Paraguay, Peru, Brazil and Argentina.

=== Argentina ===
Amparo in Argentina is a limited, summary, emergency procedure, and merely supplementary, requiring previous exhaustion of administrative remedies before rendition of judgment of mandamus or injunction. The decision bars monetary awards and penal provisions except contempt or declaration of unconstitutionality. The 1994 constitution establishes the right to amparo in article 43.

=== Chile ===
In Chile, the term recurso de amparo ("amparo remedy") refers to what is known in comparative law as habeas corpus. Chile's equivalent of amparo is the recurso de protección ("protection remedy").

=== Colombia ===
In Colombia the Constitution of 1991 implemented a system named Acción de tutela (Tutelage action). The legal procedure resembles the Amparo law but is modified to be implemented in instances of imminent risk for any individual within the Colombian population. According to the Constitutional Court (Sentence T-451 of July 10, 1992) whether a right is to be judged as fundamental or not may be determined in a case-by-case basis; this means that the Constitution acknowledges that it can't be determined what are the corresponding fundamental rights therefore they may not only include the ones implicitly addressed by the Constitution of 1991 in Chapter I Title II.

=== Haiti ===
Jurists in Haiti, close to the Collectif des Juristes Progressistes Haitiens (Progressive Lawyers' Network), learning from the Filipino experience, are said to be preparing propositions for the Government to introduce a writ of amparo as a safeguard against frequent kidnappings and arbitrary arrests and torture cases.

== Extension to the world ==
Universal Declaration of Human rights (UDHR) The inclusion of human rights in the UDHR is largely attributable to Latin America and NGOs forcing its inclusion into the Charter of the United Nations, at the San Francisco Conference, after the Great Powers at Dumbarton Oaks had made only one reference to human rights. When the UDHR was negotiated, Mexico successfully had amparo included in the UDHR, as Article 8.

"Article 8 Everyone has the right to an effective remedy by the competent national tribunals for acts violating the fundamental rights granted him by the constitution or by law." The right to an effective remedy is included in the International Covenant on Civil and Political Rights (ICCPR) in its article 2, Paragraph 3:

3. Each State Party to the present Covenant undertakes: (a) To ensure that any person whose rights or freedoms as herein recognized are violated shall have an effective remedy, notwithstanding that the violation has been committed by persons acting in an official capacity; (b) To ensure that any person claiming such a remedy shall have his right thereto determined by competent judicial, administrative or legislative authorities, or by any other competent authority provided for by the legal system of the State, and to develop the possibilities of judicial remedy; (c) To ensure that the competent authorities shall enforce such remedies when granted.

This is usually referred to as the "substantive" procedural right, the flipside of the "fair procedure" contained in Article 14 of ICCPR.[In the USA the two together make up "due process"]

States ratifying ICCPR "undertakes to take the necessary steps, in accordance with its constitutional processes and with the provisions of the present Covenant, to adopt such laws or other measures as may be necessary to give effect to the rights recognized in the present Covenant." (Article 2)

Therefore, when there is a gap between a state's amparo remedies and ICCPR, the state is obliged to adapt amparo up to ICCPR's minimum standards, unless there is a legitimate reservation when ratifying, or what is known as derogation, or limitation or restriction.

Limitations/restrictions must be authorised by the article itself: See Siracusa Principles on the Limitation and Derogation of Provisions in the International Covenant on Civil and Political Rights Annex, UN Doc E/CN.4/1984/4 (1984)

=== Spain ===
Under the current Spanish Constitution of 1978, a writ of amparo may be filed by any natural or legal person, domestic or foreign, as well by the Public Prosecutor and the Ombudsman, at the Constitutional Court. Its function is to protect the rights enshrined in the constitution-the fundamental rights contained in the Preliminary Title and First Section of Chapter II of Title I, to protect rights recognized in the Articles 14 to 29 of the Constitution and as well as conscientious objection to military service under Article 30.

It is a subsidiary remedy that requires all alternative relevant avenues have been exhausted in ordinary courts before turning to the Constitutional Court.

=== The Philippines ===
The writs of amparo and habeas data are prerogative writs introduced in the Philippines to supplement the inefficacy of habeas corpus (Rule 102, Revised Rules of Court). Amparo means protection, while habeas data is access to information. Both writs were conceived to solve the extensive Philippine extrajudicial killings and forced disappearances since 1999.

On July 16, 2007, Philippine Chief Justice Reynato Puno and Justice Adolfo Azcuna officially declared the legal conception of the Philippine writ of amparo – "recurso de amparo", at the historic Manila Hotel National Summit on Extrajudicial Killings and Enforced Disappearances.

On August 25, 2007, Reynato Puno (at the College of Law of Silliman University in Dumaguete) declared the legal conception of amparo's twin, the supplemental Philippine Habeas Data. Puno by judicial fiat proclaimed the legal birth of these twin peremptory writs in October 2007, as his legacy to the Filipino nation. Puno admitted the inefficacy of habeas corpus, under Rule 102, Rules of Court, since government officers repeatedly failed to produce the body upon mere submission of the defense of alibi.

By invoking the right to truth, habeas data will not only compel military and government agents to release information about the desaparecidos but require access to military and police files. Reynato Puno's writ of amparo—Spanish for protection—will bar military officers in judicial proceedings to issue denial answers regarding petitions on disappearances or extrajudicial executions, which were legally permitted in habeas corpus proceedings.

The Supreme Court of the Philippines announced that the draft guidelines (Committee on Revision of Rules) for the writ of amparo were approved on September 23, to be deliberated by the en banc court on September 25.

== See also ==
- Writ of security
- Verfassungsbeschwerde
- Habeas corpus

== Bibliography ==
- Sagües, Néstor P. (2007). La Acción de Amparo (5th ed.). Buenos Aires: Editorial Astrea. ISBN 978-950-508-762-4.
