= Minuscule 2437 =

- New Testament manuscript
- Text: Gospels †
- Date: 11th/12th century
- Script: Greek
- Now at: Biblioteca Nacional
- Size: 20 by 15 cm
- Type: Byzantine text-type
- Category: V

Minuscule 2437 (in the Gregory-Aland numbering), is a Greek minuscule manuscript of the New Testament, on 220 parchment leaves (20 by 15 cm). Paleographically it has been assigned to the 11th or 12th century.

== Description ==
The codex contains almost complete text of the four Gospels with some lacunae. The text is written in one column per page, 24 lines per page. Quotations from the Old Testament are marked. It contains some pictures.

The Greek text of the codex is a representative of the Byzantine text-type. Aland placed it in Category V.

According to the Claremont Profile Method it represents textual cluster 1519 in Luke 1, Luke 10, and Luke 20.

It is currently housed at the Biblioteca Nacional (I. 2) at Rio de Janeiro. It is the most ancient manuscript of the New Testament housed in Latin America.

== See also ==
- List of New Testament minuscules
- Textual criticism
