= Gui Ruck =

Brazilian footballer (born 2009)

Personal information
- Full name: Guilherme Militão de Oliveira Ruck Veja
- Date of birth: 2 February 2009 (age 17)
- Place of birth: Angra dos Reis, Rio de Janeiro, Brazil
- Position: Midfielder

Team information
- Current team: Porto Vitória

Youth career
- Mundo da Bola
- R9 Academy
- Álvares Cabral
- Porto Vitória
- 2018–2019: Vitória Guimarães
- 2019: Braga
- 2019: Porto
- 2020–2022: Rayo Majadahonda
- 2022–2024: Real Valladolid
- 2024–2025: Flamengo
- 2025: Coimbra-MG

Senior career*
| Years | Team | Apps | (Gls) |
| 2026– | Porto Vitória | 0 | (0) |
- * Club domestic league appearances and goals as of 15:43, 5 June 2026 (UTC)

Guilherme Militão de Oliveira Ruck Veja (born 2 February 2009), known as Gui Ruck, is a Brazilian footballer who plays as a midfielder for Porto Vitória.

== Early life ==
Ruck was born in Angra dos Reis, Rio de Janeiro, Brazil, and moved to Vitória in the state of Espírito Santo at the age of five. It was in Rio that he developed his love for football, and he would play in local courts as a child with other children older than himself.

== Club career ==
=== Early career ===
==== Brazil and Portugal ====
Having started his career in Espírito Santo with the youth teams of Mundo da Bola and R9 Academy, Ruck would leave the state, going on to play futsal for Clube Álvares Cabral, as well as for the academy of semi-professional side Porto Vitória.

In 2017 his father decided to move the family to Portugal, and they settled in Guimarães, where his father met Brazilian footballer Davidson through mutual friends. Davidson invited the family to stay in his home for a month and a half, and after he joined Portuguese side Vitória Guimarães in 2018, he took Ruck to trial with the side.

It took only two days of trialling for Vitória Guimarães to offer Ruck a place in their academy, but after a month and a half he was spotted by Braga; having been on the bench in a youth game between the sides and the score 2–0 to Braga, Ruck was brought on as a substitute and scored a hat-trick to win the game 3–2. He was invited to trial with Braga, and after signing with the club, he went on to score eighty-seven goals in the next four months.

These performances caught the eye of Porto, and having been invited to visit the club's facilities, he scored five goals in a training match against the older age group side, and was offered a place in the academy. Despite performing well in Porto's academy, Ruck was described as unhappy by his father, who also claimed that the other players would bully Ruck because he was a better player than they were, also accusing them of having xenophobic attitudes towards his son.

==== Move to Spain ====
Having performed well against them in the final of a youth tournament, Ruck was invited to move to Spain and join Atlético de Madrid. The family made the move in January 2020, and he joined the academy of Rayo Majadahonda in Madrid, an affiliate of Atlético, due to issues with his paperwork. His performances at Rayo Majadahonda again drew the interest of bigger clubs, with Real Madrid and Barcelona being touted as potential suitors.

It was in Madrid that Ruck's family met agent Luiz Rocha, and after taking him on as a client, Rocha introduced him to Ronaldo and Paulo André, directors at then-La Liga side Real Valladolid. He participated in a youth tournament in France with Real Valladolid, and after scoring three goals and assisting five, he was offered a place in the club's academy for the 2022–23 season. In his first twenty-three games with the club, he contributed eight goals and fourteen assists, and this form drew attention from a number of top clubs in Europe.

==== Return to Brazil ====
In July 2023, he was reportedly subject to an offer from Brazilian side Flamengo. In May 2024 he was strongly linked with English sides Crystal Palace and Nottingham Forest, going as far as to travel to England to reportedly negotiate terms. He was also approached by Spanish and French clubs Real Madrid and Paris Saint-Germain, respectively, but ultimately returned to Brazil, signing a three-year contract with Flamengo. Upon signing in August 2024, he stated "it's a very special day in my life", and that it was an "honour to wear the shirt of this giant club that is Flamengo" on his Instagram page.

== Personal life ==
Ruck became the youngest footballer to sign a contract with German sportswear manufacturer Adidas, when he did so in 2019.
