= National Library of Brazil =

Library in Rio de Janeiro, Brazil

Coordinates: 22.909723°S 43.175501°W

Biblioteca Nacional do Brasil

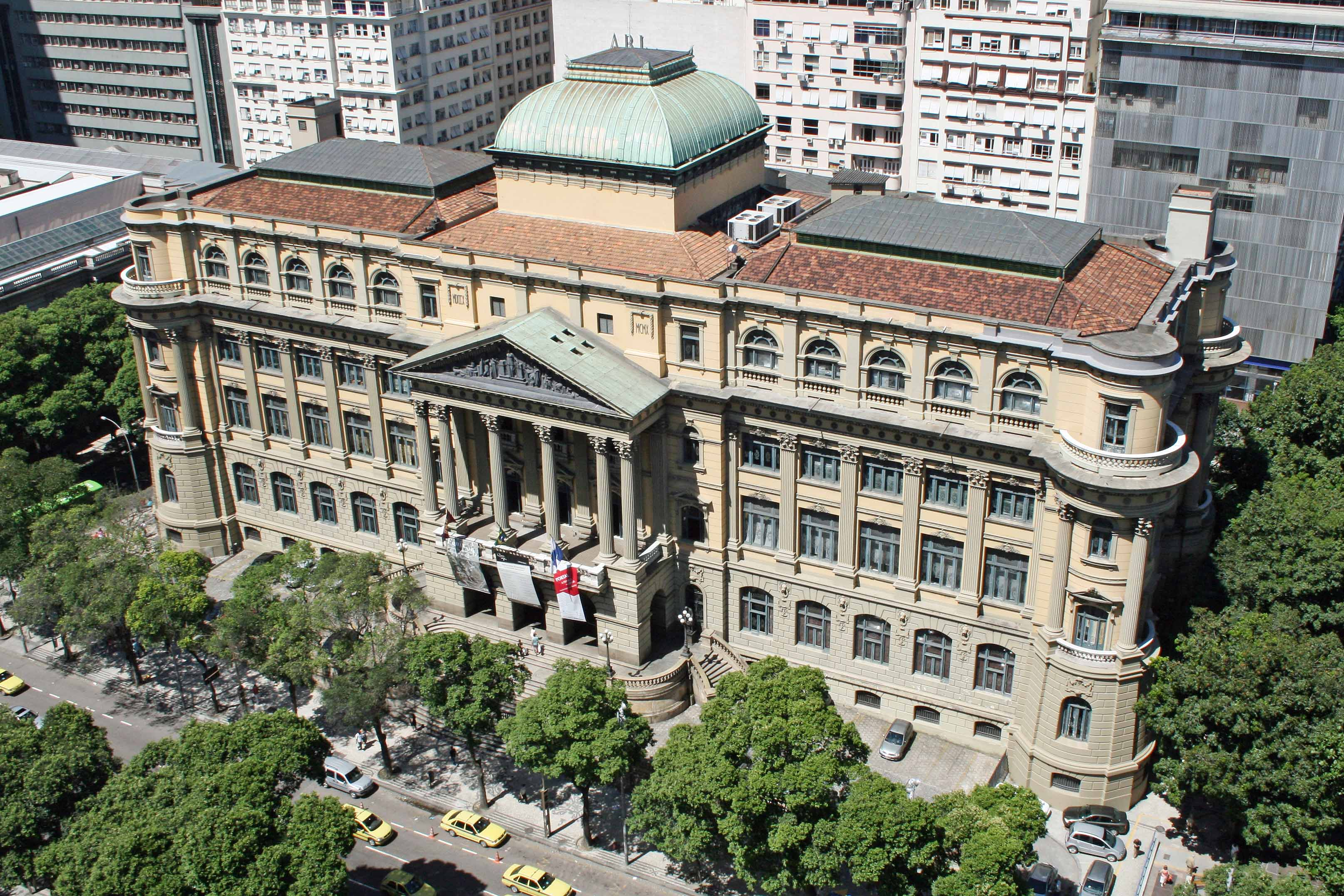
- Aerial view of the library
- Location: Rio de Janeiro, Brazil
- Established: 1810; 216 years ago

Collection
- Size: 9,000,000 Items

Access and use
- Population served: open to the public

Other information
- Director: Luiz Carlos Ramiro Junior
- Website: https://www.bn.gov.br/en

The National Library of Brazil (Portuguese: Biblioteca Nacional do Brasil, official name is Fundação Biblioteca Nacional) is the depository of the bibliographic and documentary heritage of Brazil. It is located in Rio de Janeiro, the capital city of Brazil from 1763 to 1960, more specifically at Cinelândia square.

Considered by UNESCO the largest library in Latin America and the seventh largest in the world, its collections include about 9 million items. It organized the first library science courses in Latin America and its staff has led the modernization of library services, including the development of online databases.

== History ==
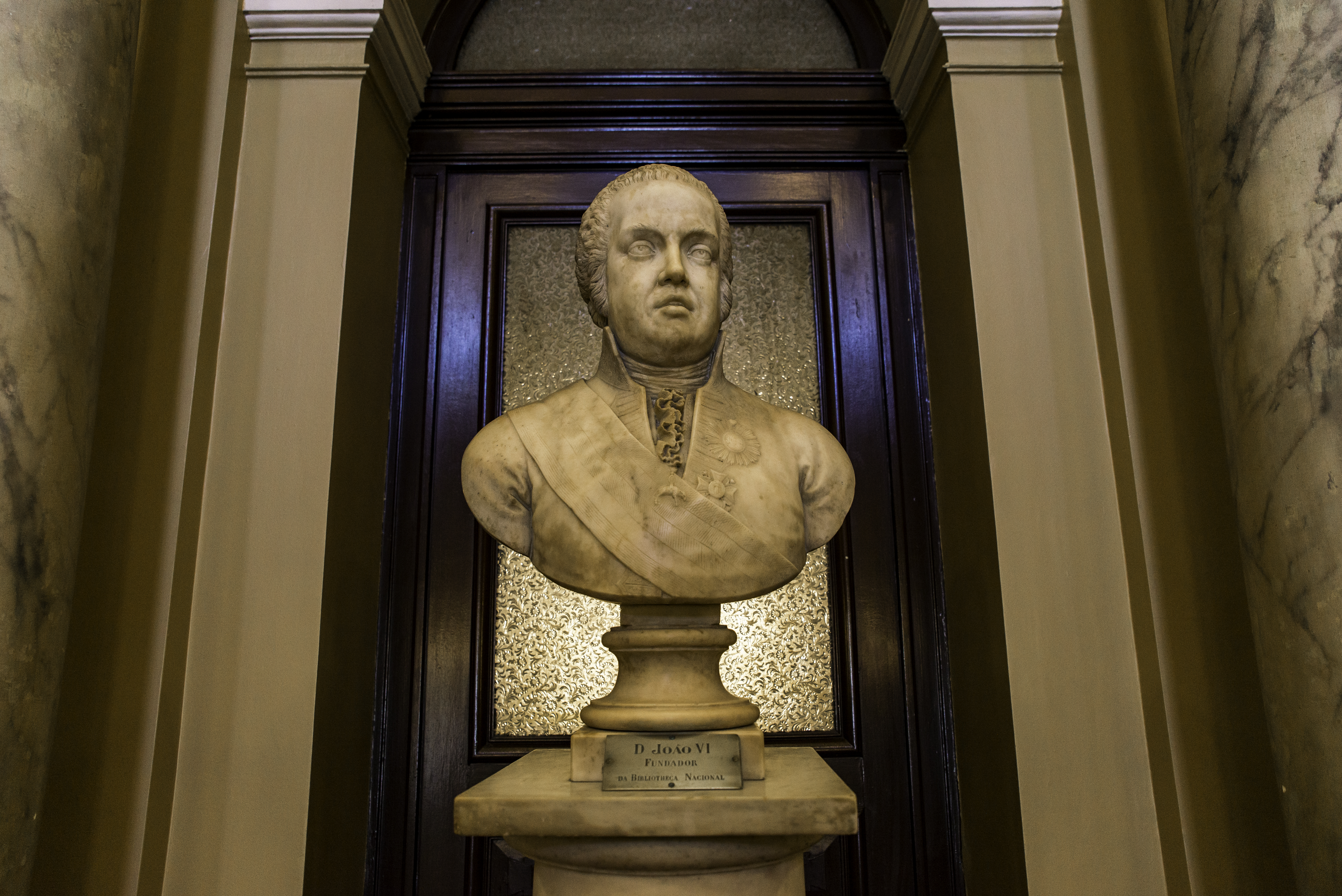
Bust of the library's founder, King John VI of Portugal.

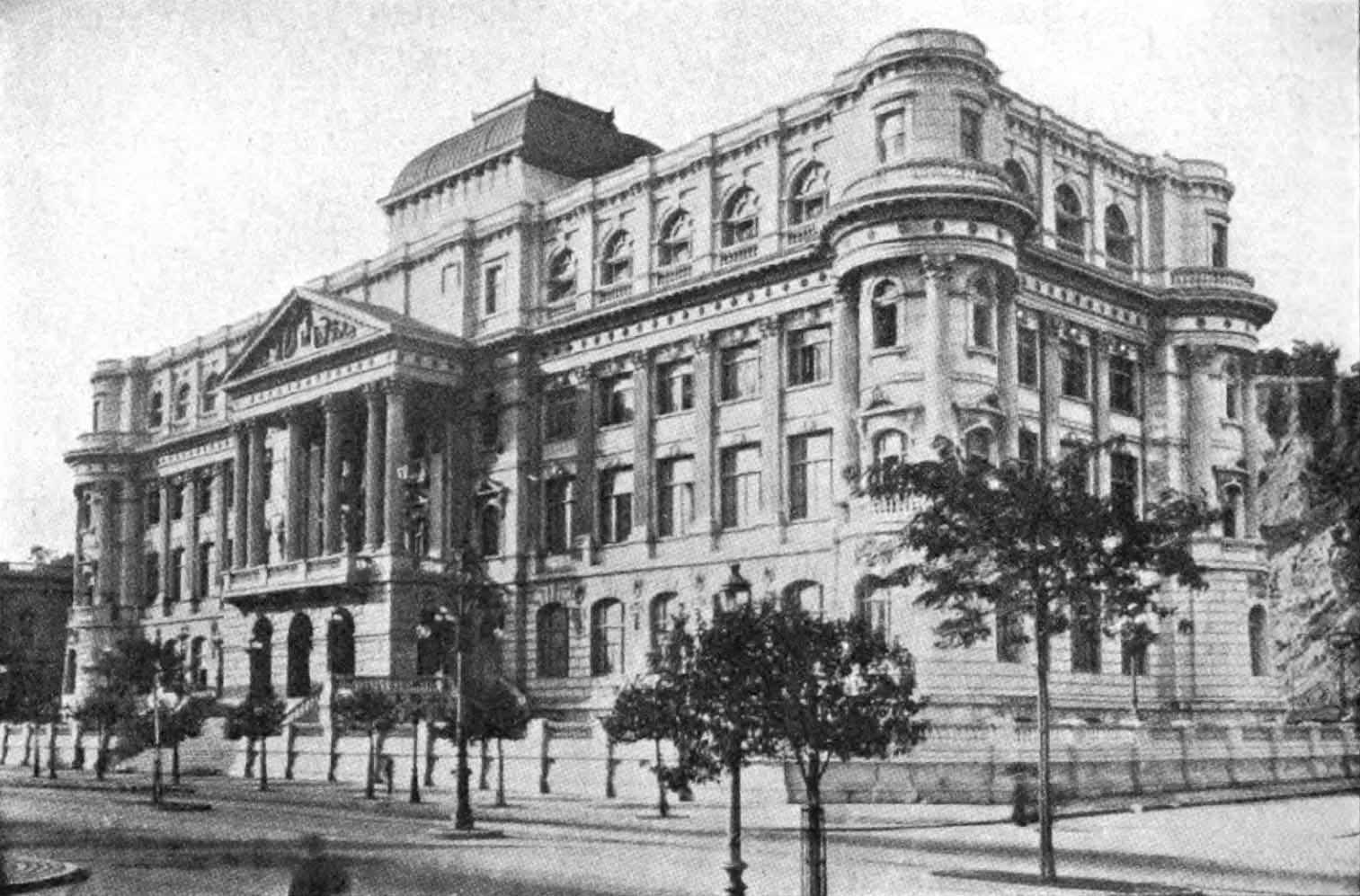
The National Library, c. 1920

The history of the National Library began on 1 November 1755, when Lisbon suffered a violent earthquake. The Royal Library was considered one of the most important libraries in Europe at that time. This irreparable loss to the Portuguese was the impetus for moving many of its contents to Brazil. The collection was brought in three stages, the first being in 1810 and two in 1811. The library of 60,000 books was accommodated initially in the upstairs rooms of the Third Order of Carmel Hospital (in accordance with the charter of July 27, 1810), located in the old back street of Carmel close to the Imperial Palace. The facilities, however, were considered inadequate and as well potentially jeopardizing the valuable collection. Therefore, on 29 October 1810, a date that was assigned to the official founding of the National Library, Prince Regent John (later King John VI of Portugal, Brazil and the Algarves) issued a decree which provided that a royal library should be established from the funds of the royal treasury.

=== Expansion ===
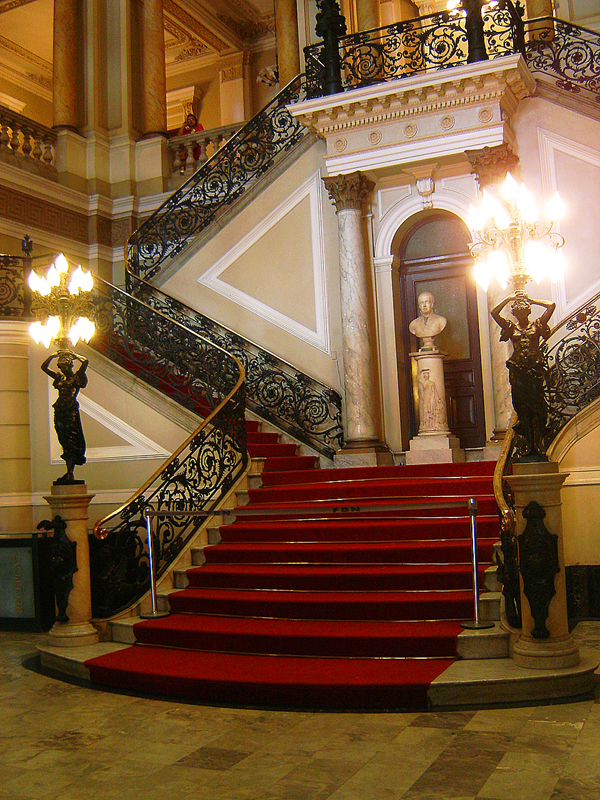
Main entrance to the library

The works for the new building of the library only took place in 1813, when the collection was transferred. While the process of setting up the books, which began in 1810, was taking place the consultation of the library collection could already be carried out by scholars, by royal consent, and in 1814, after the collection of the collection was completed, the consultation was public.

Officially established, the library continued to have a significant expansion through purchases, donations, mainly, and "tips", that is, by the obligatory delivery of a copy of all printed material in the typographic offices of Portugal (By decree of 12 September 1805) and in the Royal Printing, installed in Rio de Janeiro. This legislation on tips was improved over the years and culminated in Decree No. 1,825 of 20 December 1907, commonly called the Legal Deposit Decree, still in force.

=== Transfer of sovereignty ===
After the death of Queen Maria I in March 1816, the reign of King John VI began, and it remained in Brazil until 1821, when political circumstances made him return to Lisbon with the royal family, except for his eldest son Prince Pedro de Alcântara of Braganza (future Emperor of Brazil), who would later proclaim the independence of Brazil in 1822. Here also remained the Royal Library. By that time it had grown significantly and, after Independence, in 1822, became property of the Empire of Brazil, because its purchase is included in the Additional Convention to the Treaty of Friendship and Alliance signed between Brazil and Portugal on 29 August 1825. For the goods left in Brazil the royal family was indemnified in two million pounds sterling, of that value, eight hundred contos de reis were destined to the payment of the Royal Library, which was then called the Imperial and Public Library of the Court.

=== Building ===
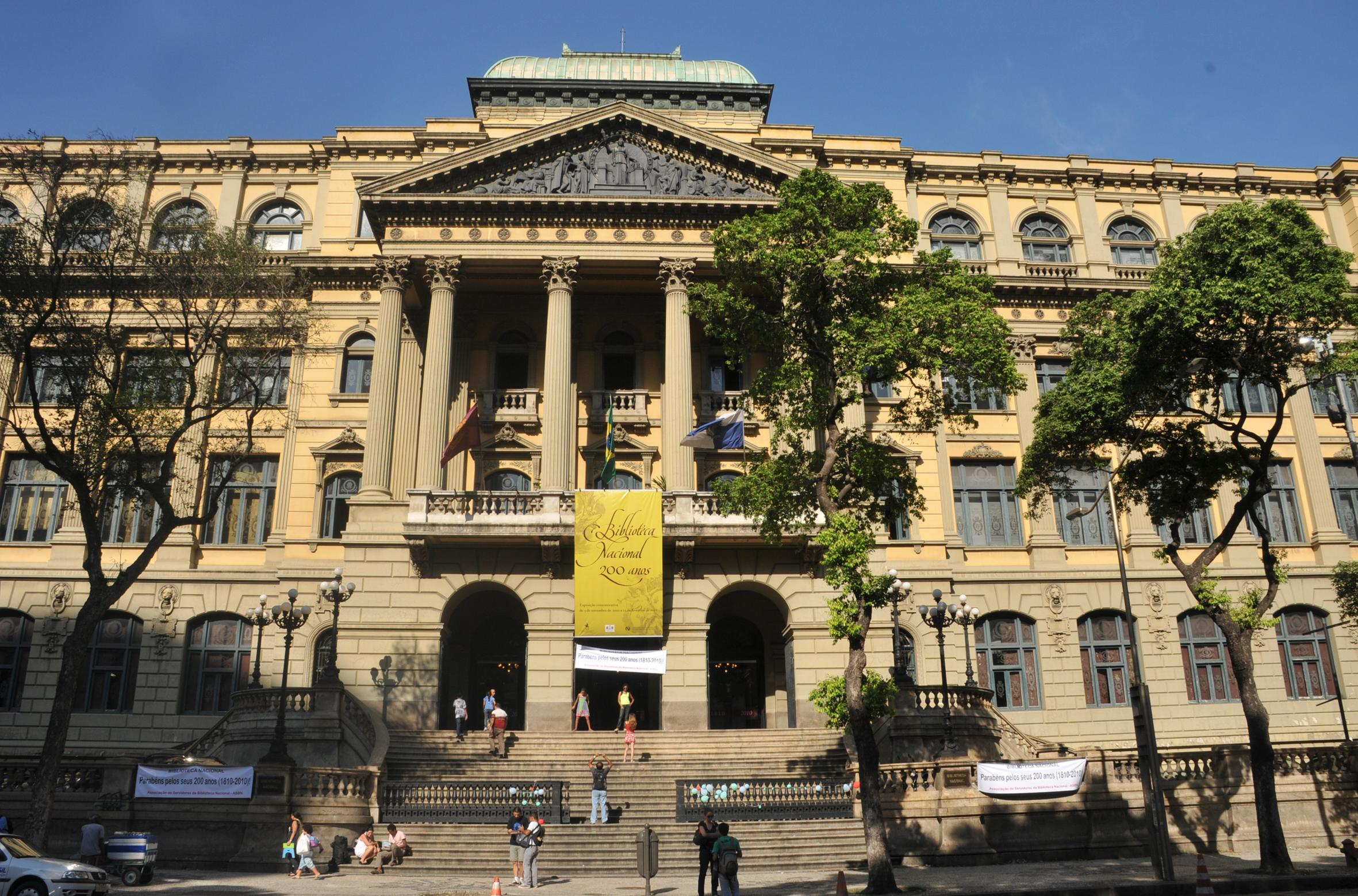
Façade of the current building in 2010

In 1858, the library was transferred to the Passeio street, number 60, in Lapa square, and installed in the building intended to better shelter its collection. As its collection continued to grow with donations, acquisitions and through legal contributions, purchase of rare art collections at auctions and in bookstores around the world, a new building was needed that better suited its needs.

The constant and permanent growth of the collection of the library was fundamental for the realization of a project of construction of a building that would attend all the needs of the library, adequately accommodating its collections. Based on this, the current building was designed. The cornerstone was laid on 15 August 1905, during the government of Rodrigues Alves. The inauguration took place on 29 October 1910, during the Nilo Peçanha government and in the first centenary of the library.

The building of the National Library, designed by the military engineer Sousa Aguiar, has an eclectic style, in which neoclassical and Art Nouveau elements are mixed, and contains ornaments by artists such as Eliseu Visconti, Henrique and Rodolfo Bernardelli, Modesto Brocos and Rodolfo Amoedo. In 1903 Eliseu Visconti had already designed the ex-libris and the emblem of the National Library.

The library building is located at Rio Branco Avenue, number 219, Cinelândia Square, in the center of Rio de Janeiro, composing with the National Museum of Fine Arts and the Municipal Theater an architectural and cultural ensemble of great value.

=== Catalog ===
In 1911, Manoel Cicero Peregrino da Silva started a national union catalog for all Brazilian libraries. He set up the first library science course in South America. Many librarians went on to study in European and North American universities.

== Legal deposit ==
In 1907, Presidential Decree no. 1825 established the duty of all publishers to send one copy of each publication to then-called Bibliotheca Nacional. In 2004, that decree was replaced by congressional Law no. 10,994, which is still in force, upholding the same mandate but updating its provisions.

Article One of Law no. 10,994 specifies that the legal deposit's aim is "to ensure the registration and custody of national intellectual production, to allow for the control, development and diffusion of current Brazilian bibliography, and to defend and preserve the national language and culture."

== Significant collections ==
Among the significant collections of the National Library of Brazil is the Teresa Cristina Maria photograph collection, which includes 21,742 photographs dating from the nineteenth century. These photographs were left to the library by Emperor D. Pedro II in 1891. This collection has been inscribed on UNESCO's Memory of the World international register in 2003 in recognition of its global significance. It features images related to Brazil's history and people from the 19th century, including photographs by Moritz Lamberg. There are also photographs from Africa, North America, and Europe.

== Gallery ==
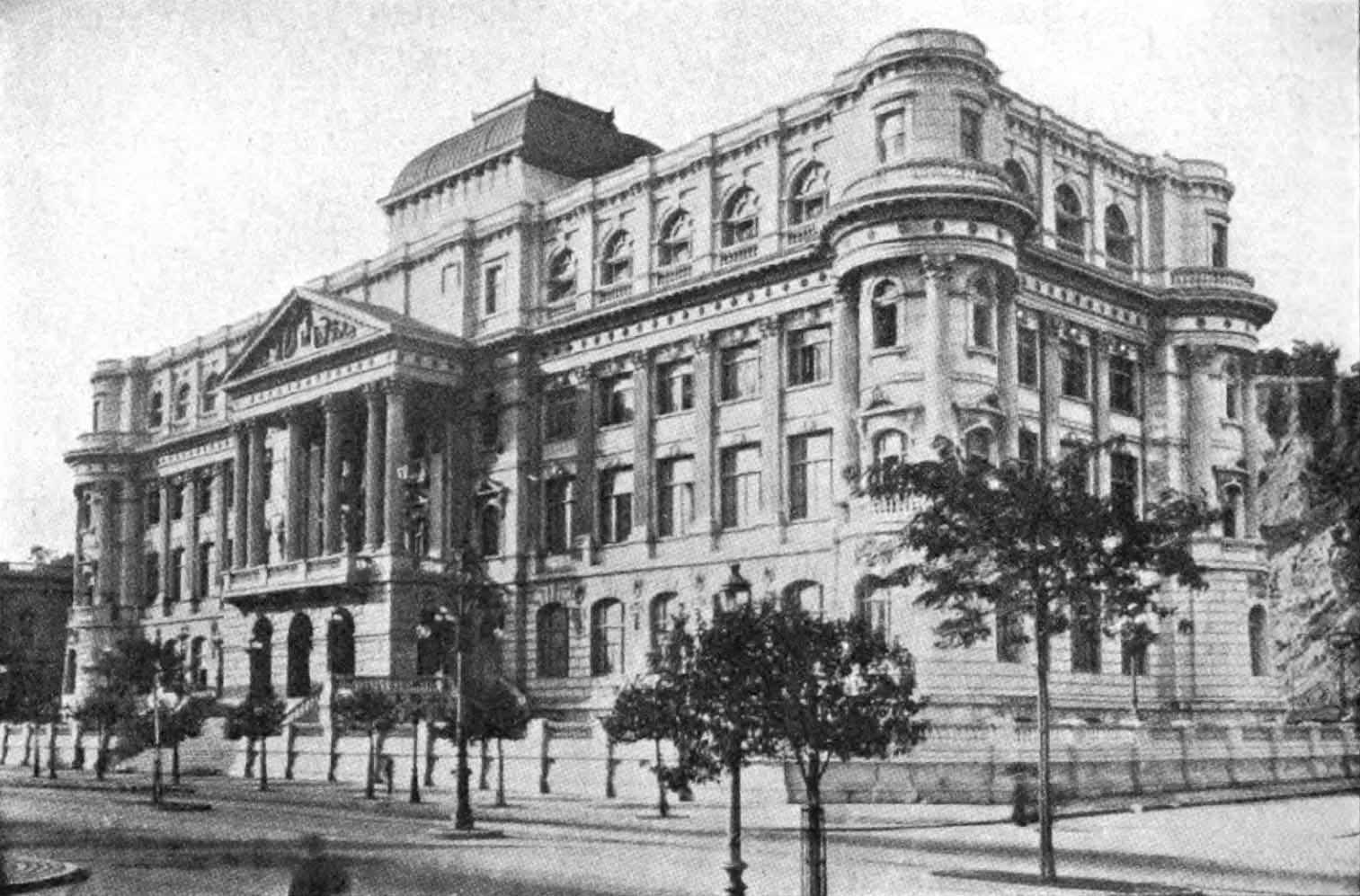
Photograph of the National Library, c. 1920

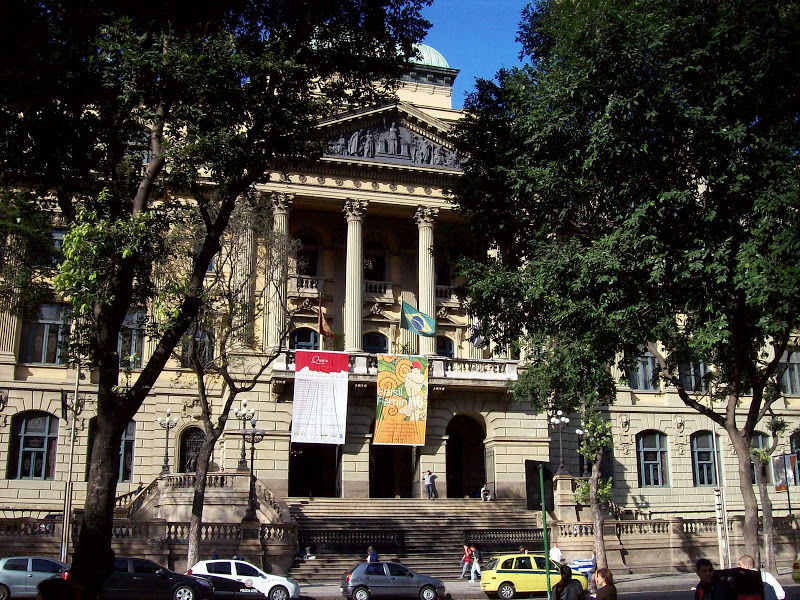
Entrance from the outside

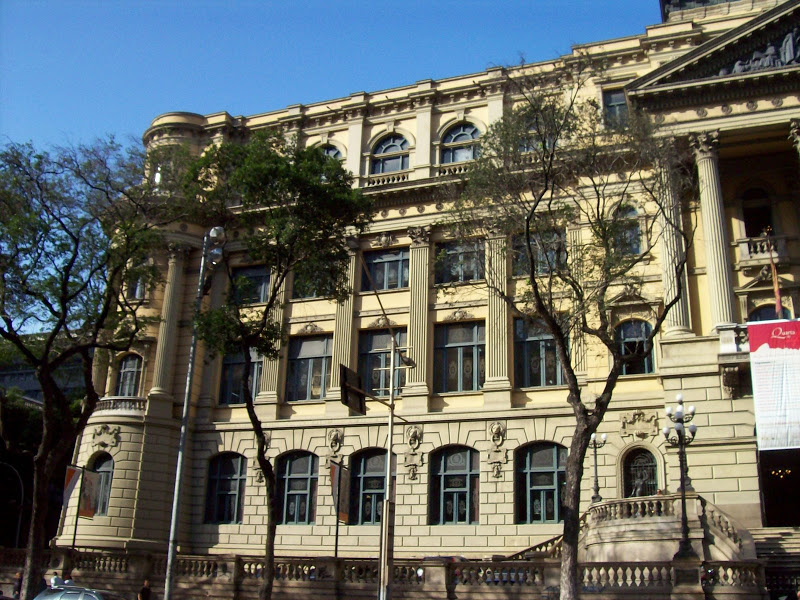
Left wing

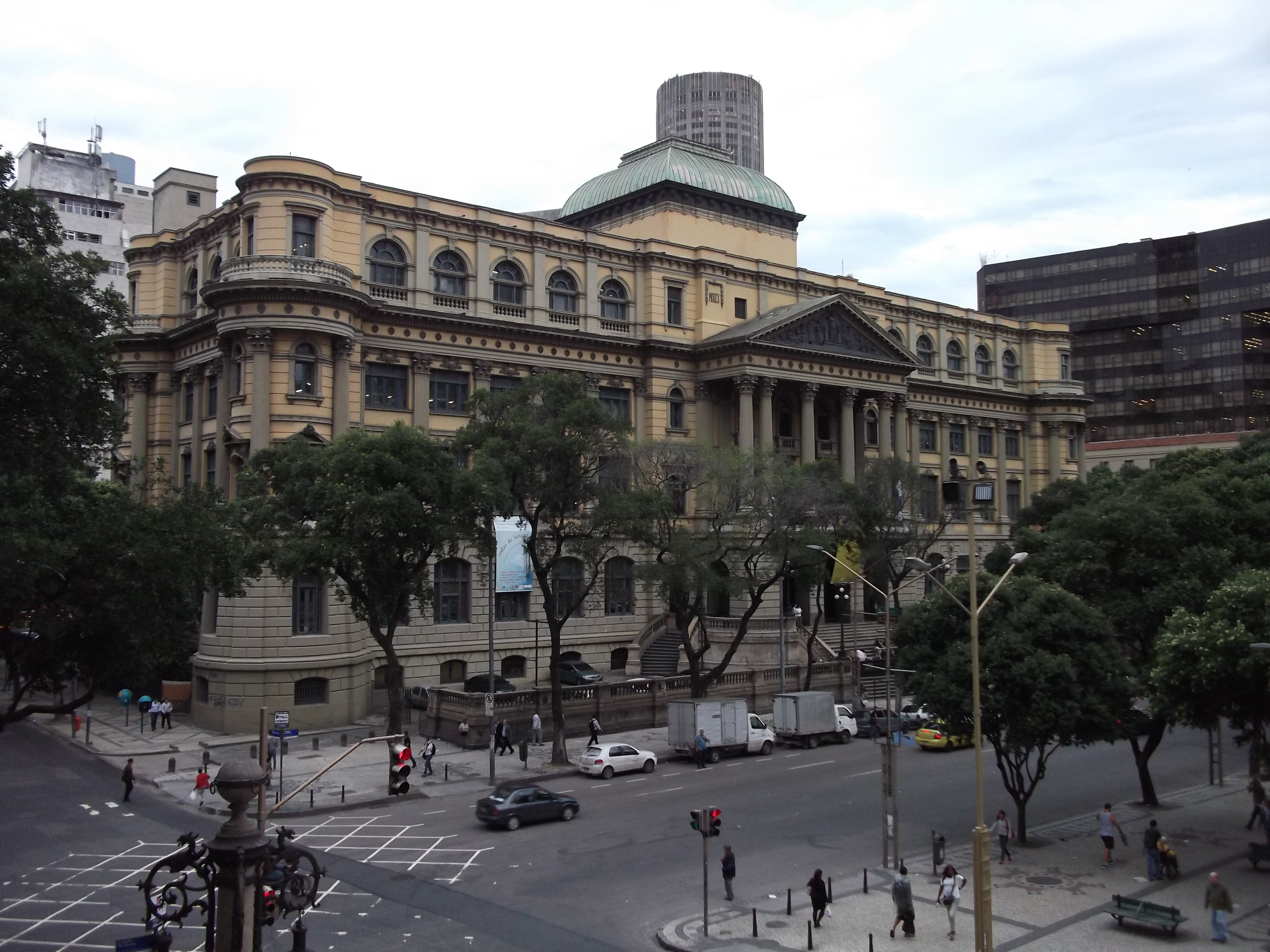
The Library as seen from the Municipal Theatre

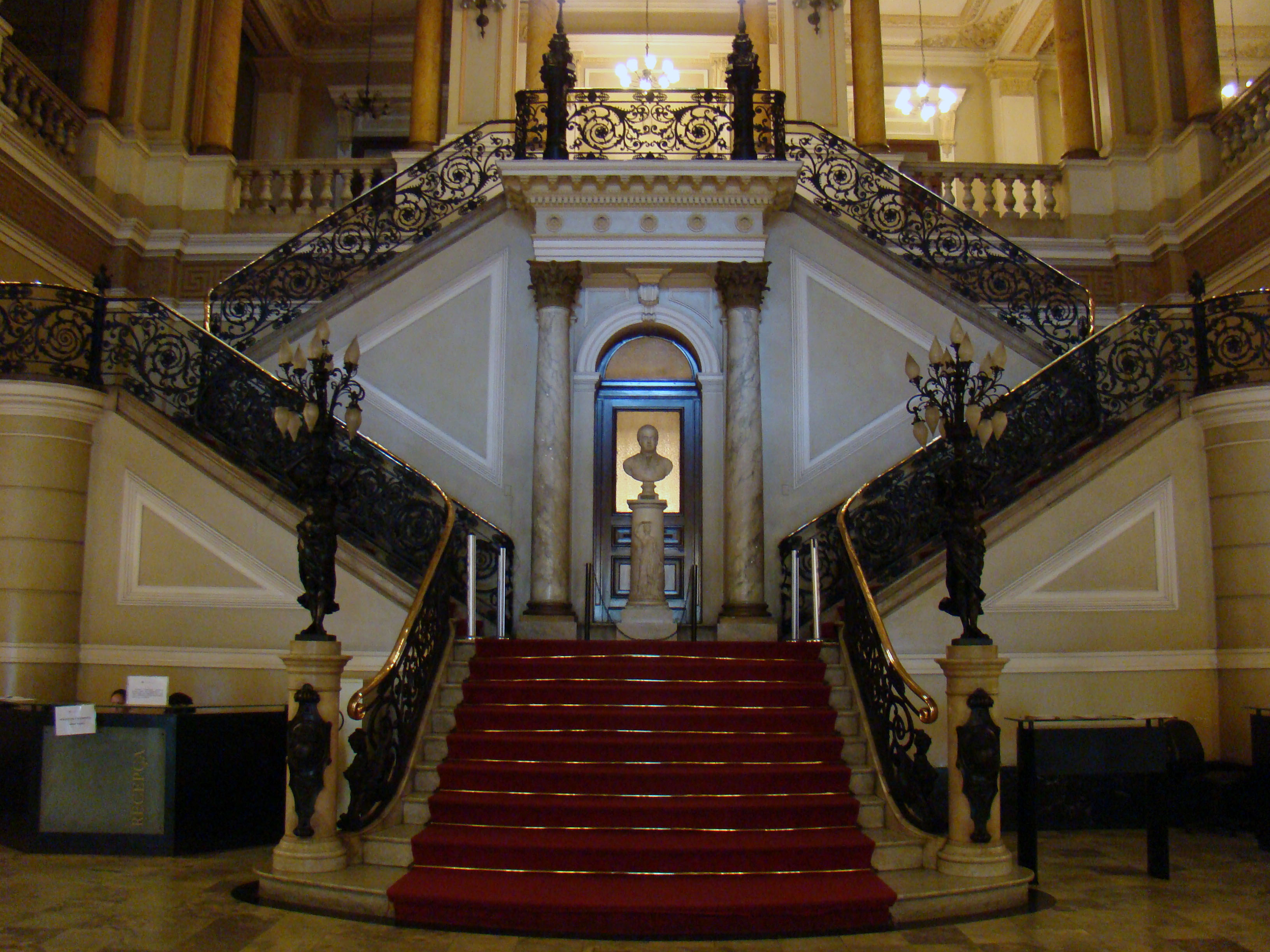
The main staircase with a bust of King John VI

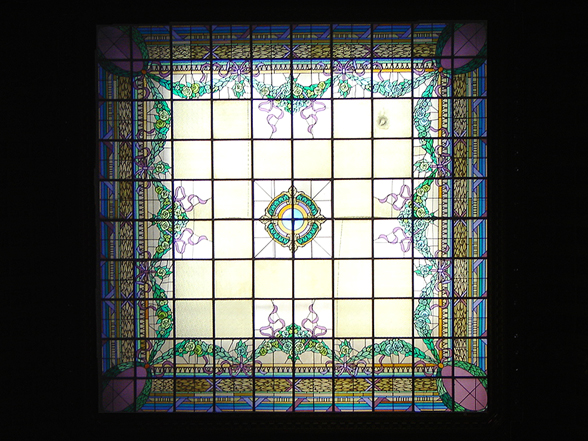
Stained glass ceiling

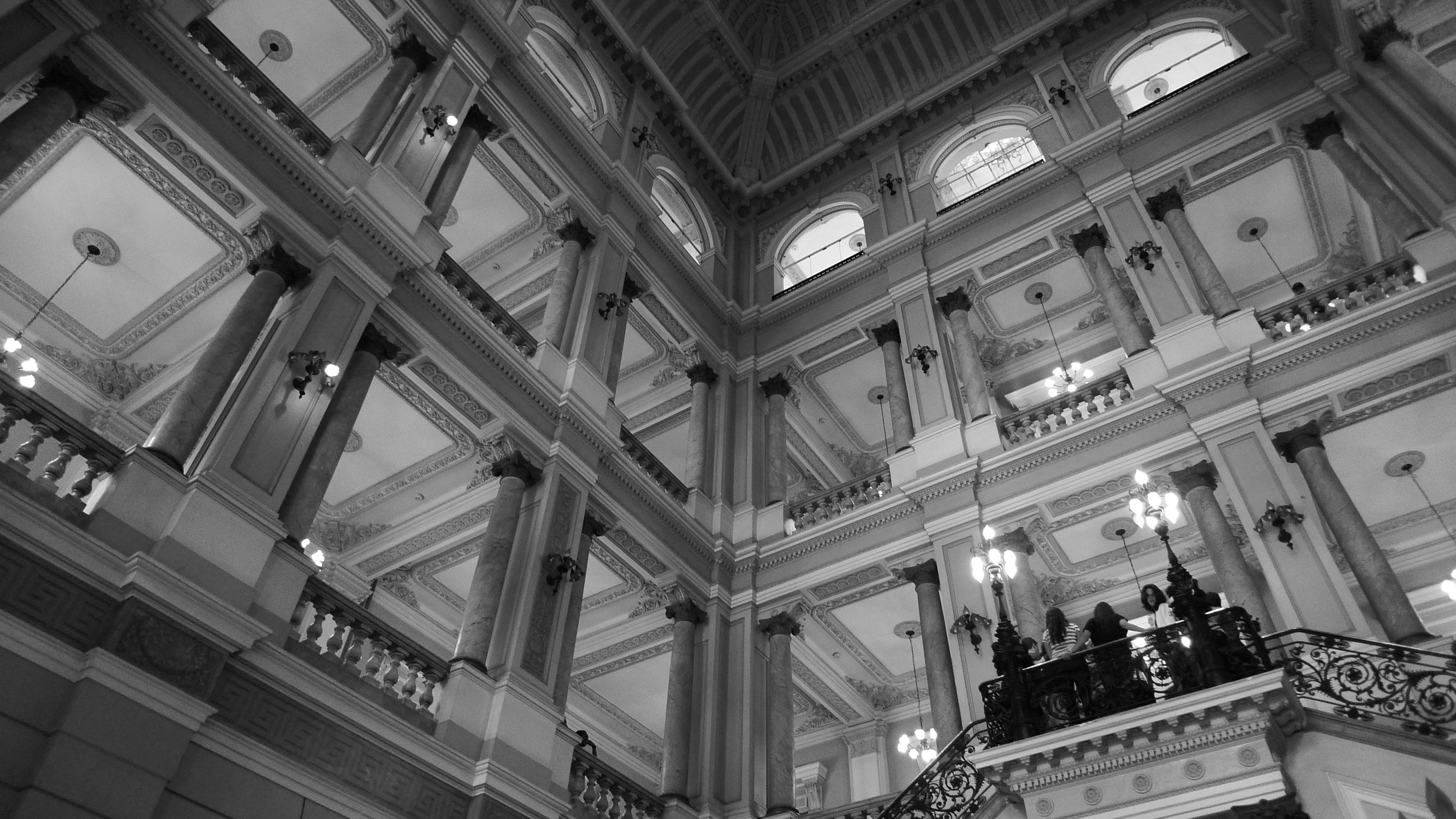
Entrance Hall

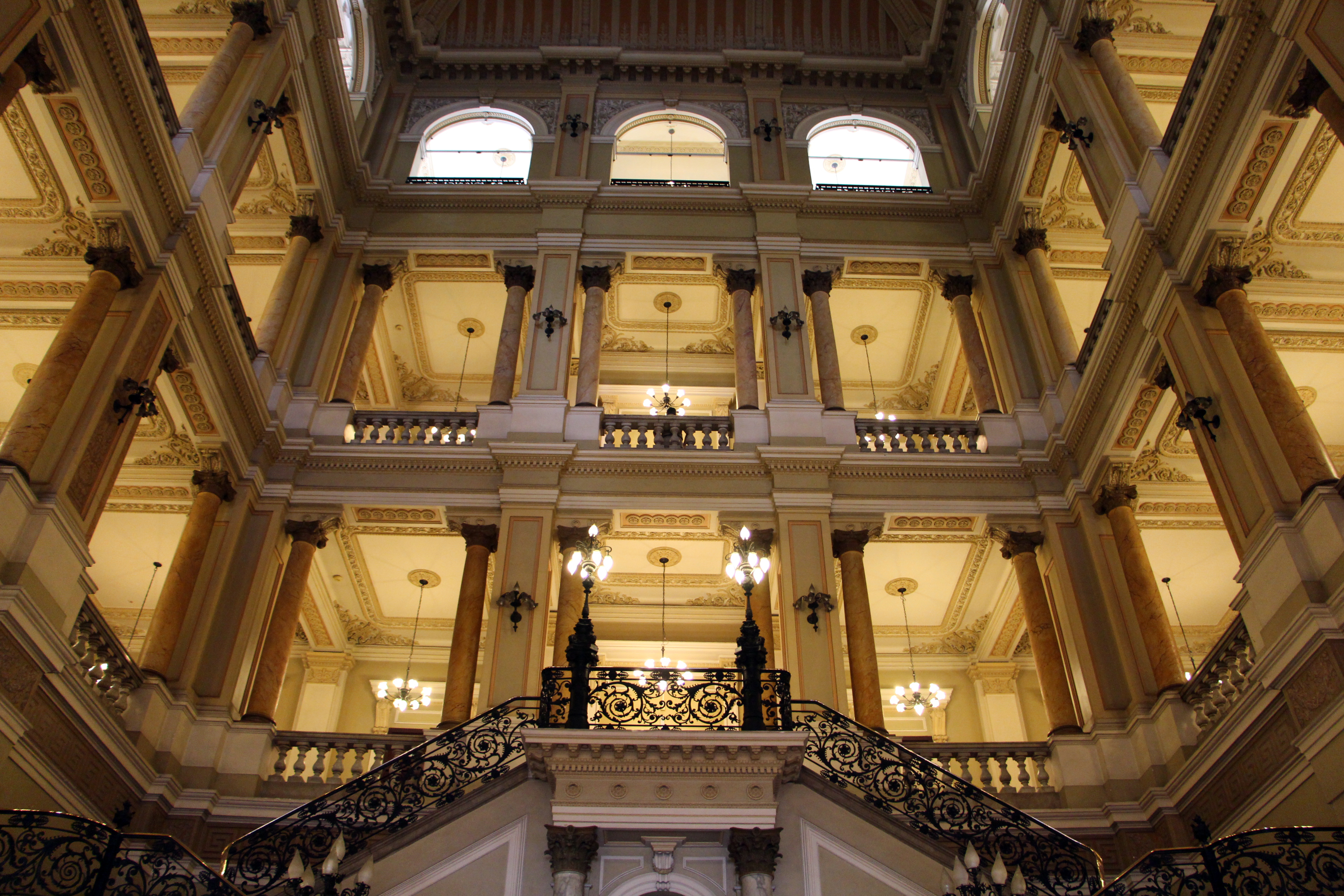
Entrance Hall

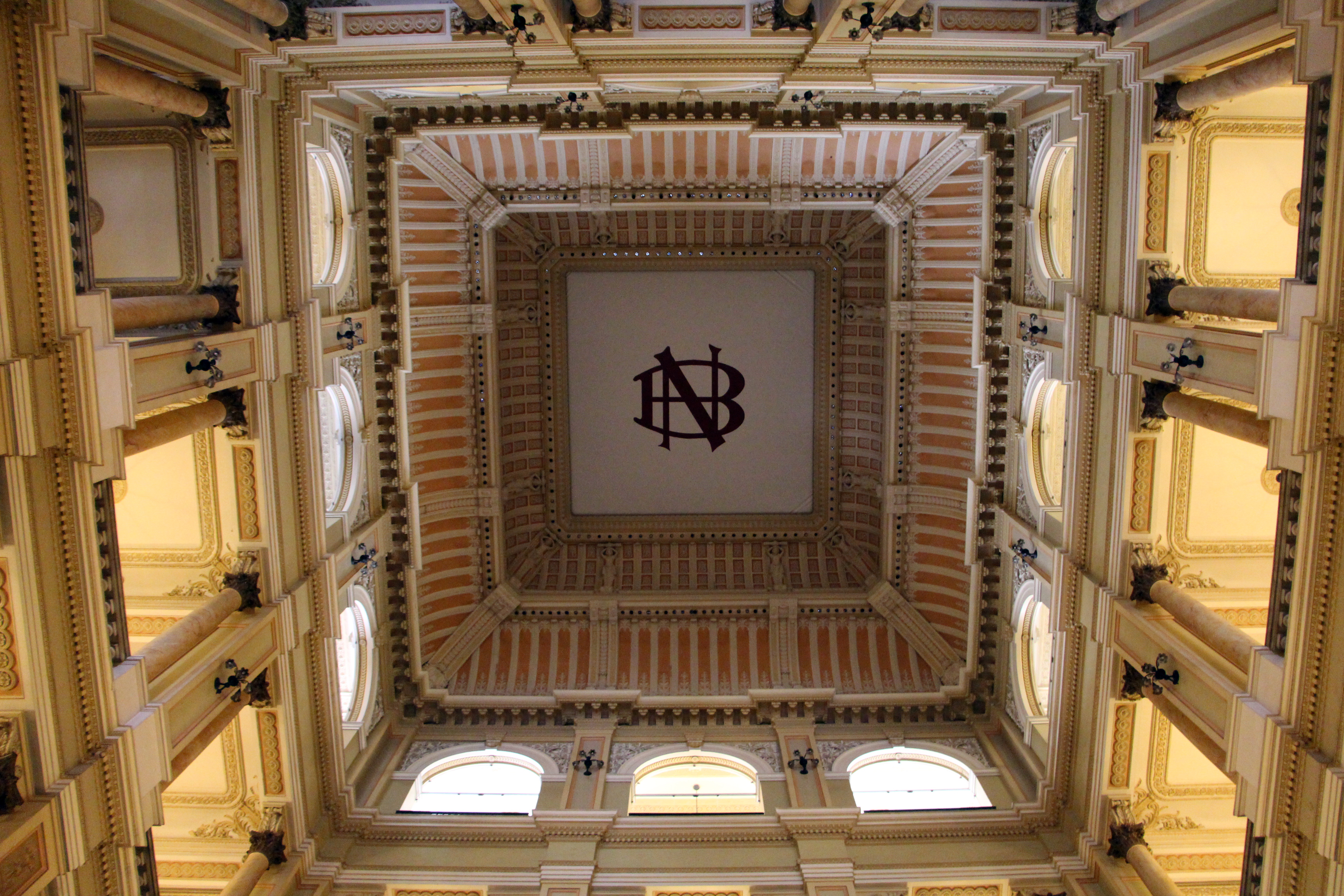
Entrance Hall: ceiling

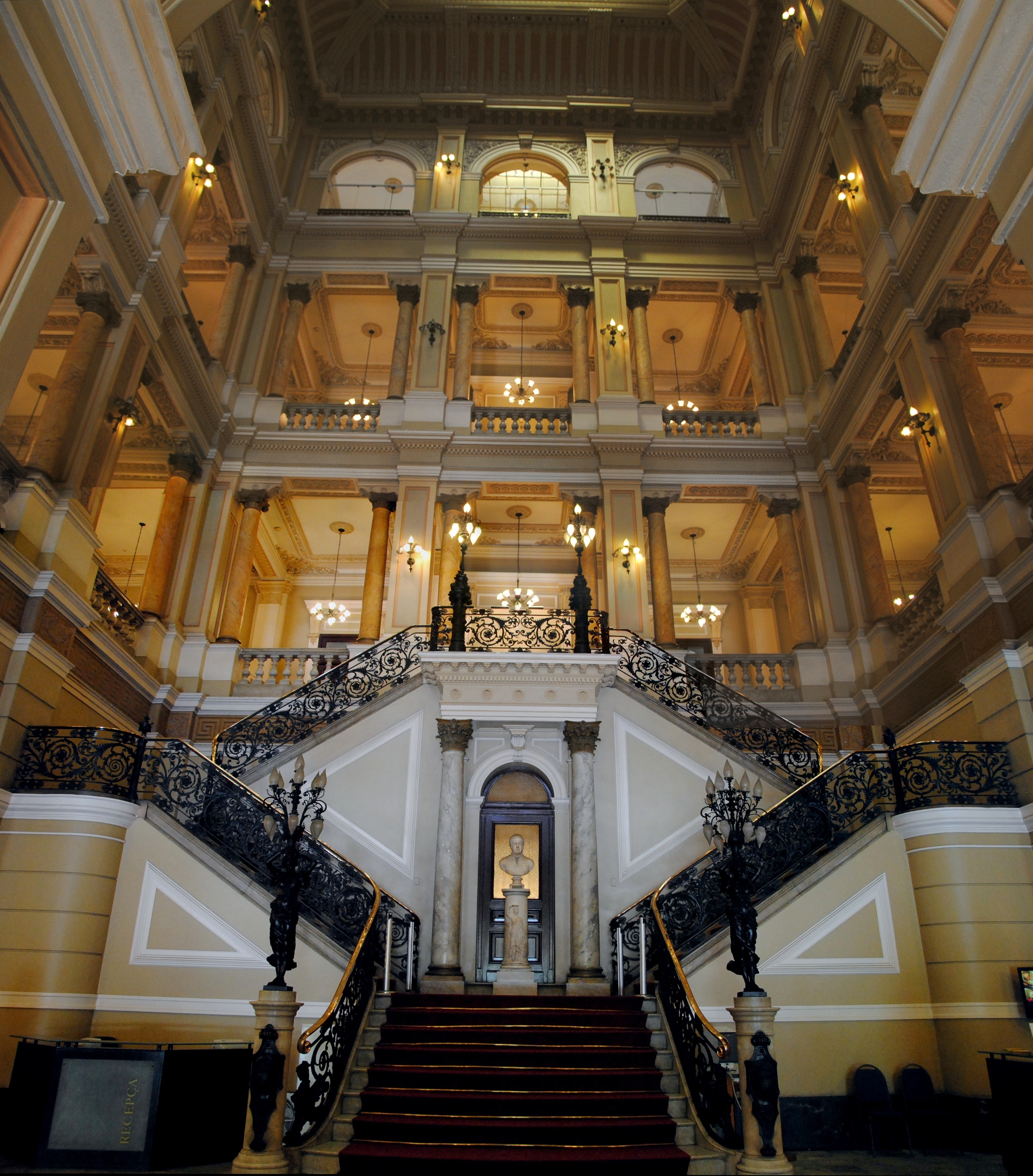
Entrance Hall

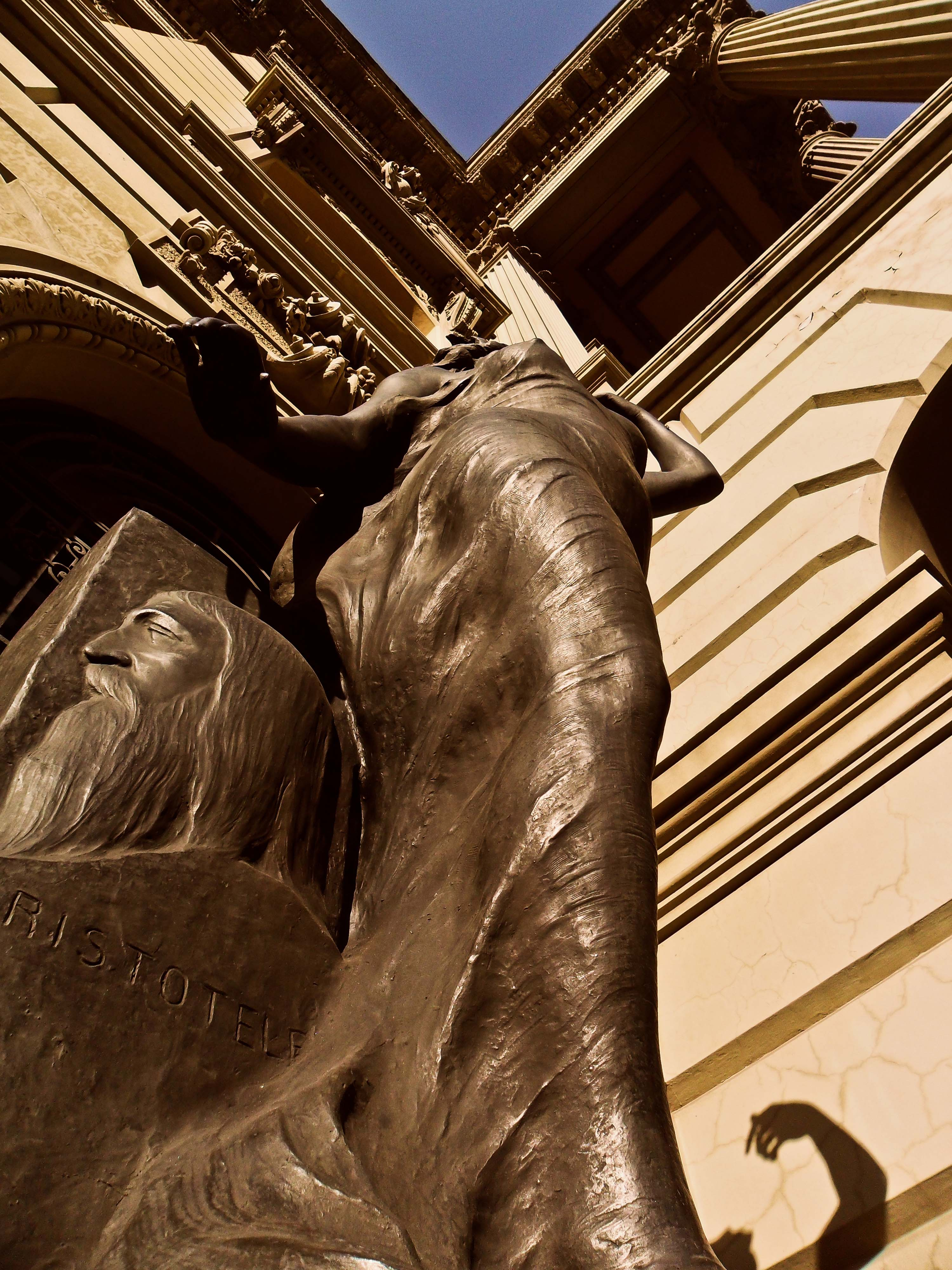
Façade details

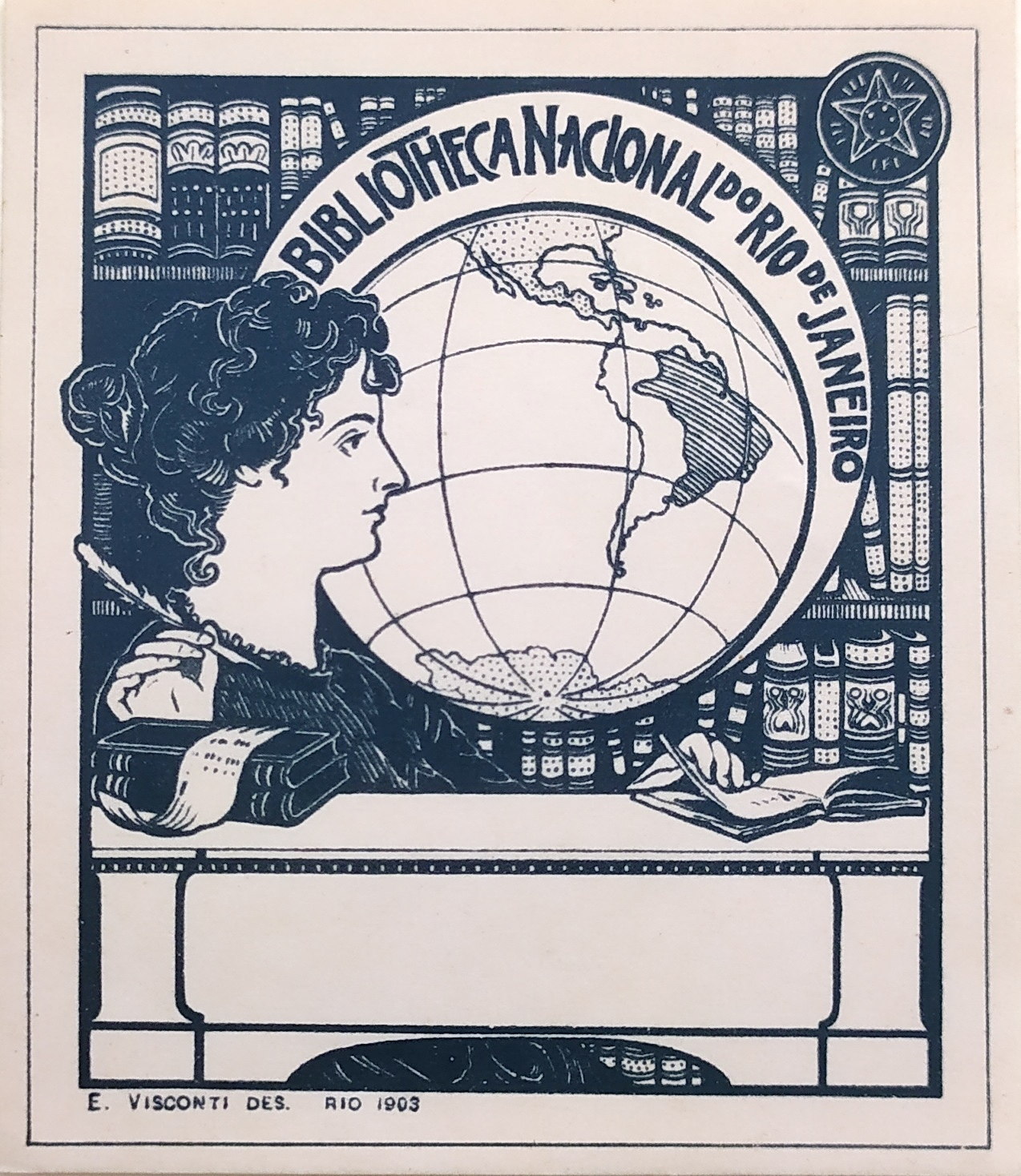
Ex libris

== List of former directors ==
- Frei Camilo de Monserrate (29 April 1853 to 19 November 1870) (in Portuguese)
- Ramiz Galvão
- João Saldanha da Gama
- F. L. Bitencourt Sampaio
- Francisco Mendes da Rocha
- Raul Pompeia
- José Alexandre Teixeira de Melo (in Portuguese) (1895–1900)
- Manuel Cícero Peregrino da Silva (in Portuguese) (1900–1924)
- Mario Behring (interim, 1923)
- Aurélio Lopes de Souza
- Basílio de Magalhães
- Rodolfo Garcia (1932–1945)
- Rubens Borba de Moraes (1945–1947)
- Josué Montello (1947–1953)
- Eugênio Gomes (1951–1956)
- Adonias Filho
- Jannice Monte-Mór
- Plínio Doyle
- Celia Ribeiro Zaher
- Affonso Romano de Sant'Anna (1990–1996)
- Eduardo Portella (1996–2002)
- Pedro Corrêa do Lago (2003–2005)
- Muniz Sodré (2009–2011)
- Galeno Amorim (2011–2013)
- Renato Lessa (2013–2016)
- Helena Porto Severo da Costa (2016–2019) (in Portuguese)
- Rafael Nogueira (2019–2022)
- Luiz Carlos Ramiro Junior (2022–present)

== See also ==
- List of libraries in Brazil
- Legal deposit
- National library
- Minuscule 2437
- Brazilian National Archives
- Asociación de Estados Iberoamericanos para el Desarrollo de las Bibliotecas Nacionales de Iberoamérica
