= Tempo de Amar =

Brazilian telenovela

- Also known as: A Time to Love
- Genre: Telenovela
- Created by: Alcides Nogueira
- Directed by: Jayme Monjardim; Adriano Melo; Teresa Lampreia
- Starring: Bruno Cabrerizo; Vitória Strada; Jayme Matarazzo; Tony Ramos; Letícia Sabatella; Regina Duarte; Henri Castelli; Marisa Orth; Cássio Gabus Mendes; Nívea Maria; Andreia Horta
- Opening theme: "Amar Pelos Dois" by Salvador Sobral
- Composer: Luísa Sobral
- Country of origin: Brazil
- Original language: Portuguese
- No. of episodes: 148

Production
- Camera setup: Multi-camera
- Running time: 31—42 minutes
- Production company: Estúdios Globo

Original release
- Network: TV Globo
- Release: 26 September 2017 – 19 March 2018

Tempo de Amar (English title: A Time to Love) is a Brazilian telenovela produced and broadcast by TV Globo. It premiered on 26 September 2017, replacing Novo Mundo and concluded its run on 19 March 2018, being replaced by Orgulho e Paixão. It is created by Alcides Nogueira. The telenovela is based on the works of Rubem Fonseca and features writing collaborations by Tarcísio Lara Puiati and Bíbi Da Pieve. Adriano Melo, Teresa Lampreia and Jayme Monjardim serve as the main directors.

It stars Bruno Cabrerizo, Vitória Strada, Jayme Matarazzo, Tony Ramos, Letícia Sabatella, Regina Duarte, Henri Castelli, Marisa Orth, Bruno Ferrari, Cássio Gabus Mendes, Nívea Maria and Andreia Horta.

== Plot ==
The story begins in Morros Verdes, fictional city of Portugal, and tells the story of Maria Vitória and Inácio. Maria Vitória became partially orphaned when her mother died at an early age and was raised by her father, José Augusto. During a religious procession, he meets Inácio, a simple young man, who lives in the neighbouring village, and lives on temporary jobs. They start dating, but the couple split up after Inácio gets a job in Rio de Janeiro. He leaves without knowing that Maria Vitória is pregnant.

== Production ==
During early stages of production the provisional title was Amor e Morte. The initial filming took place in Rio Grande do Sul in Serra Gaucha, also in Niterói, Rio de Janeiro.

In November 2015, Rubem Fonseca and Bia Corrêa do Lago, submitted the synopsis of a plot to the 6 pm timeslot, and was scheduled to debut the following year. In March 2016, Alcides Nogueira was reported to part ways with Bia Corrêa, after the news that she would write most of the episodes alone, but in April, the project was postponed to 2018, after Alessandra Poggi and Angela Chaves' Os Dias Eram Assim, that was to replace Novo Mundo, but that was moved to the 11 p.m. timeslot. However, in January 2017, it was announced that Tempo de Amar would replace Novo Mundo.

The original synopsis provided an approach between the years 1886 and 1888, when the abolitionist movement occurred, where historical personalities such as Joaquim Nabuco and José do Patrocínio would have contact with the characters, but not to confuse with the audience previous plot (Novo Mundo), the period history was shifted to the 1920s.

=== Casting ===
Bruna Marquezine was cast for the role of the protagonist, but left the cast to study interpretation. About 15 actresses auditioned for the protagonist; notably Giovanna Lancellotti, Laura Neiva, Marina Moschen and Sophia Abrahão. Marina Ruy Barbosa was the first to be considered for the lead role, however, she was already cast in an upcoming project by Aguinaldo Silva. Bruno Cabrerizo, a former soccer player and Vitória Strada, a gaucho model, both new to Brazilian television were cast in main roles.

== Cast ==
Actor	Character
Vitória Strada	Maria Vitória Correia Guedes
Bruno Cabrerizo	Inácio Ramos
Andreia Horta	Lucinda Macedo
Jayme Matarazzo	Fernão Muniz
Tony Ramos	José Augusto Correia Guedes
Letícia Sabatella	Delfina Leitão
Nívea Maria	Henriqueta
Regina Duarte	Madame Lucerne
Henri Castelli	Teodoro Magalhães
Bruno Ferrari	Vicente Gomes da Rocha
Lucy Alves	Eunice
Cássio Gabus Mendes	Reinaldo Macedo
Françoise Forton	Emília
Deborah Evelyn	Alzira
Nelson Freitas	Bernardo
Marisa Orth	Celeste Hermínia
Werner Schünemann	Coronel Francisco Alcino
Jackson Antunes	Geraldo
Sabrina Petraglia	Olímpia Gomes da Rocha
Marcello Melo Jr.	Edgar
Olívia Torres	Tereza Leitão
Barbara França	Celina
Mayana Moura	Carolina de Sobral
Eli Ferreira	Tiana
Jessika Alves	Helena Pacheco (Lena)
Amanda de Godoi	Felícia Pacheco (Lícia)
Giulia Gayoso	Natália Pacheco (Naná)
Bete Mendes	Irmã Imaculada
Malu Valle	Irmã Margarida
Yasmin Gomlevsky	Irmã Assunção
Karine Teles	Odete
Maria Eduarda de Carvalho	Gilberte
Ana Carbatti	Isolina
José Augusto Branco	Padre João
Valquíria Ribeiro	Balbina
Ricardo Vianna	Tomaso
Guilherme Prates	Giuseppe
Guilherme Leicam	Artur
Cristiano Garcia	Gregório
Odilon Wagner	Álvaro Muniz
Olívia Araújo	Nicota
Lívian Aragão	Angélica
Maicon Rodrigues	Pepito
Jorge de Sá	Justino
Inez Viana	Guiomar
Joelson Medeiros	Firmino de Oliveira
Fátima Montenegro	Elvira de Oliveira
Roberto Frota	Figueirinha
Marcel Octavio	Otávio
Gustavo Arthiddoro	Raimundo
Rosi Campos	Urânia
Antônia Frering	Aspasia

=== Guest cast ===
Actor	Character
Erik Marmo	Martim
Giselle Prattes	Josefina

== Soundtrack ==
=== Volume 1 ===
Tempo de Amar: Vol 1

Soundtrack album by Various artists
- Released: 9 October 2017
- Length: 54:58
- Label: Som Livre

Tempo de Amar Vol. 1 is the first soundtrack of the telenovela, released on 9 October 2017 by Som Livre.

No.	Title	Artist(s)	Length
1.	"Amar Pelos Dois"	Salvador Sobral	3:04
2.	"Tempo De Amar"	Milton Nascimento	2:54
3.	"Do Amor Impossível"	Nana Caymmi	4:27
4.	"Fado"	Maria Bethânia	2:25
5.	"Falando De Amor"	Carminho & Chico Buarque	3:33
6.	"Com Mais Ninguém"	Djavan	3:38
7.	"Caminho De Pedra"	Caetano Veloso	5:51
8.	"Cruel"	Nina Fernandes	3:39
9.	"Nosso Nó(s)"	Sandy	4:01
10.	"Simples Assim"	Ivete Sangalo	3:49
11.	"O Que A Gente Faz Agora"	Marina Elali	3:34
12.	"Vida É Arte"	Jorge Vercillo	5:58
13.	"Siciliana"	Alexandre Guerra	4:03
14.	"Céu E Mar"	Marisa Orth & Nani Palmeira	4:02
Total length:			54:58

=== Volume 2 ===
Tempo de Amar: Vol 2

Soundtrack album by Various artists
- Released: 12 January 2018
- Length: 45:09
- Label: Som Livre

Tempo de Amar Vol. 2 is the second soundtrack of the telenovela, released on 12 January 2018 by Som Livre.

No.	Title	Artist(s)	Length
1.	"Thou Swell"	Taryn Szpilman, Nani Palmeira & Iuri Cunha	2:19
2.	"Cicatriz"	Paula Fernandes	4:04
3.	"O Que Dizer de Você"	OutroEu	3:12
4.	"Mês de Maio"	Almir Sater	3:43
5.	"Fado da Despedida"	Marisa Orth & Iuri Cunha	2:33
6.	"Meu Coração Está Amando"	Gustavo Mioto	3:07
7.	"A Outra Metade"	Chico Pessoa	3:41
8.	"A Vida é Cheia Dessas Coisas"	Dani Black	3:47
9.	"Sei de um Rio"	Camané	4:10
10.	"Faltavam Seus Olhos"	Zizi Possi	3:33
11.	"Beati Omnes"	Marcus Viana & Lulia Dib	4:55
12.	"Um Dia de Sol"	Papas da Língua	4:20
13.	"After You'Ve Gone"	Salvador Sobral	1:55
Total length:			45:09

== Reception ==
=== Ratings ===
Timeslot (AT)	# Eps.	Premiere		Finale		TV season	Average viewership
Timeslot (AT)	# Eps.	Date	Viewers (in points)	Date	Viewers (in points)	TV season	Average viewership
Monday—Saturday; 6:35 pm	148	26 September 2017	26	19 March 2018	27	2017	22.6

Preceded by Novo Mundo; 22 March 2017–25 September 2017	Globo 6 p.m. timeslot telenovela 26 September 2017–19 March 2018	Succeeded by Orgulho e Paixão; 20 March 2018–24 September 2018
