= Writ of security =

Legal remedy in Brazil

In the law of Brazil, the writ of security (Portuguese: mandado de segurança) is a remedy used to protect individual rights. It resembles in some respects the writ of amparo ("writ of protection"), available in other Latin American nations, as well as the writ of mandamus of common law jurisdictions.
