= Largo do Machado =

Public square in Rio de Janeiro, Brazil

Coordinates: 22°55′51″S 43°10′43″W

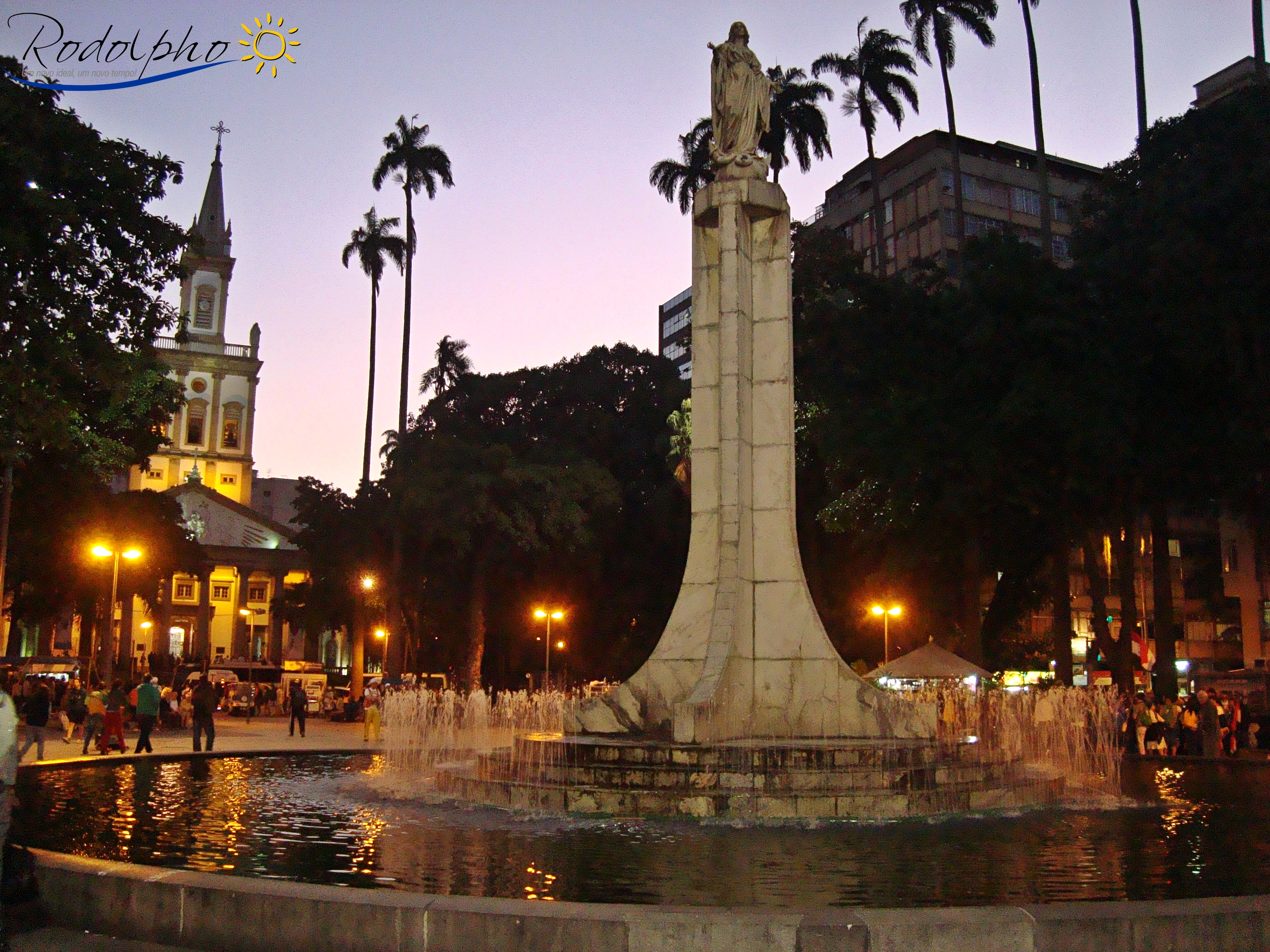
Largo do Machado

Largo do Machado is a square located on the border of the Catete, Flamengo and Laranjeiras neighborhoods in the city of Rio de Janeiro, Brazil.

== In popular culture ==
=== In music ===
- Largo do Machado, by Francisco Eller
- The song Os Últimos Serão os Primeiros, by BR-101, mentions the Largo do Machado

=== Literature ===
- Three novels by Machado de Assis mention the Largo do Machado: Ressurreição (1872), Esaú e Jacó (1904) e Memorial de Aire (1907).
