= Janacópulos =

Janacópulos is a surname. Notable people with the surname include:

- Adriana Janacópulos (1897–c.1978), Brazilian sculptor
- Vera Janacópulos (1886 or 1892–1955), Brazilian singer
