= Helena (Machado de Assis novel) =

Novel by Joaquim Maria Machado de Assis

Helena is a novel written by the Brazilian writer Machado de Assis. It was first published in 1876.

== Plot summary ==
The novel opens with the family of Estácio, whose father, Conselheiro Vale, has just died. In his will, Conselheiro has recognized a natural daughter, previously unknown to both Estácio and his aunt Dona Úrsula, with whom he shares the family home. The daughter, Helena, arrives to a mixed reception. Estácio welcomes her warmly while his aunt shows marked hesitation over this unknown person. While Estácio grows increasingly more fond of his half-sister, Helena in a series of events succeeds in also winning the affection of the stern Dona Úrsula.

Life proceeds harmoniously in their household. Meanwhile Estácio, implicitly due to affections for Helena, defers an engagement with the beautiful, but less adroit Eugênia. Well into the novel it is revealed that Helena has been guarding a secret, one which seems to be related to a house nearby which Estácio and Helena frequently pass near while horseback riding. It is later revealed that the biological father of Helena, who is not Conselheiro Vale, lives in the house but in misery.

At this point, Helena is being courted by Estácio's friend, Mendonça even though the attraction that Estácio feels for Helena is very apparent to the reader. This affection is never truly recognized by Estácio until the preacher Melchior warns Estácio that he feels romantic love for his new sister. As this is being revealed, the reader learns that Helena is indeed not the daughter of Conselheiro Vale and consequently not a blood relation to Estácio.

However, Helena's failure to admit that she is not truly related to the family and thus should never have been recognized proves too much for her conscience and she falls ill. Helena does not recover and by her deathbed Estácio is horrified and distraught.

== Major themes ==
In Machado de Assis’ earlier, romanticist, works the role of the female figure is an important and persistent theme. When Helena arrives there is an air of suspicion regarding her background, especially from Dona Úrsula. Helena is, in many ways, a transitional character between the fading aristocratic values of the landed oligarchy and the emergent urban middle class. The importance of caste is evident among the novel’s representatives of the older generation: Dona Úrsula and Camargo. Prior to the social transitions of the period, feminine selection for marriage was a source of maintenance of the social hierarchy.

Yet, for Estácio, the issue of Helena’s class beginnings is of little consequence and he is instead endured to Helena for the virtues and skills she possesses. This is the new female dexterity which the growing middle class lauds in women. Opposed to the aristocratic values which tended towards idle beauty and adornment, the new ethic prized industry and domestic utility in the female figure. Helena was this model.

Helena is seen as a light of the future; however, the pressures of the extant social structure allow her no place in society. Trapped in despair, Helena falls ill and dies, thus taking the only escape that would be allowed at that time. She is presented as a model of and martyr for the generation of women to come.

== Literary schools of 19th century Brazil ==
19th century Brazil saw the foundations of the national literature centered around the incorporation of the novel as a suitable genre. Domestic novels were highly scrutinized in question of their impact on society and in particular the nation’s youth. Until the last quarter of the 19th century, the predominant literary school in Brazil was Romanticism, of which José de Alencar was the foremost novelist. In his first novels, characterized to some extent by sentimentality, Machado de Assis maintained affinities with the Romantic school. However, by the 1880s, he was an advocate of Brazilian Realism. Realism, along with Naturalism which Machado de Assis disdained, supplanted Romanticism as the pre-eminent novelistic form of the final two decades of the 19th century.

Helena (1876) was followed by Iaiá Garcia (1878). These two works represented the end of what is usually termed Machado de Assis' first, Romantic, phase. With The Posthumous Memoirs of Bras Cubas (1881) his Realist style would be firmly in place. This is usually considered to be the beginning of his mature work. His romantic novels: Ressurreição, A Mão e Luva, Helena and Iaiá Garcia have seen some growth in critical interest but are generally considered inferior.

== Adaptations ==
The work was adapted as a 2014 comic book, Helena.

== See also ==
- Literature of Brazil

== Bibliography ==
- Chamberlain, Bobby J. Portuguese Language and Luso-Brazilian Literature: An Annotated Guide to Selected Reference Works (Selected Bibliographies in Language and Literature. 6th Edition. New York: Modern Language Association, 1989.
- Echevarría, Roberto González and Enrique Pupo-Walker, Editors. The Cambridge Companion to Latin American Literature. Vol. 3. Brazilian Literature Bibliographies. Cambridge University Press, 1996.Google Books
- Da Silva, Hebe Christina. "José de Alencar, Nacionalidade Literária e Forma Romanesca." Trajetórias do romance : circulação, leitura e escrita nos séculos XVIII e XIX. Márcia Abreu, org. Mercado de Letras: São Paulo, 2008.
- GUIMARÃES, Hélio de Seixas. Os leitores de Machado de Assis: o romance machadiano e o público de literatura no século 19. São Paulo: Nankin Editorial, EdUSP, 2004.
- Hahner, June E. Emancipating the Female Sex: The Struggle for Women’s Rights in Brazil, 1850–1940. Duke University Press: Durham, NC, 1990.
- Pescatello, Ann. "The Brazileira: Images and Realities in Writings of Machado de Assis and Jorge Amado." Female and Male in Latin America. Ed. Ann Pescatello. University of Pittsburgh Press: Pittsburgh, PA, 1973.
- SCHWARZ, Roberto. Ao vencedor as batatas: forma literária e processo social nos inícios do romance brasileiro. 2ed. São Paulo: Duas Cidades, 1981.
- Zilberman, Regina. "Brazil". Encyclopedia of Latin American Literature Ed. Smith, Verity. Fitzroy Dearborn: Chicago, 1997.
