= Farroupilha Park =

Public park in Porto Alegre, Brazil

Coordinates: 30°02′12″S 51°12′57″W

- Parque da Redenção
- Parque Farroupilha
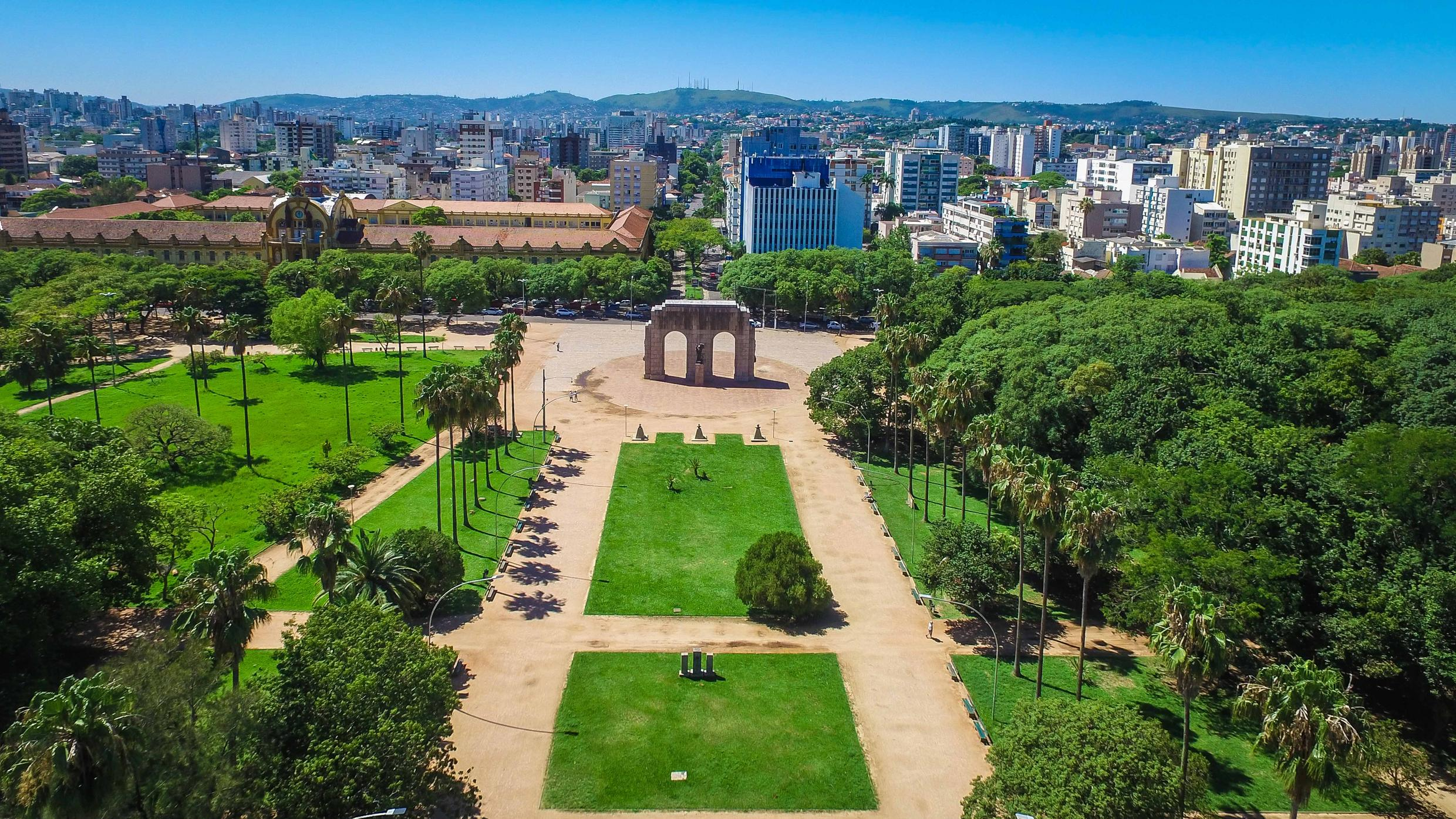
- The park in 2018
- Interactive map of Farroupilha Park
- Type: Public park
- Location: Porto Alegre, Rio Grande do Sul, Brazil
- Created: 1935
- Status: Open year round

Farroupilha Park (Parque Farroupilha in Portuguese), also known as Parque da Redenção, is a major urban park in the city of Porto Alegre, the state capital of Rio Grande do Sul, in Brazil.

The park was designed by French architect Alfred Agache and founded on September 19, 1935.

Near to the Centro Histórico (Historic Centre), Farroupilha Park is located within a polygon formed by José Bonifácio, João Pessoa, Luiz Englert, Setembrina and Osvaldo Aranha Avenues.

== History ==
The site where the park is located was formerly called Várzea do Portão, a large flooded lowlands close to the old gate to Porto Alegre. On February 23, 1807, the City Council requested the Governor of the Province, Paulo José da Silva Gama, to donate the land to be used as public area, as well as a focus area for herds of cattle brought for local supply. However, its measurement would only be effectively carried out between 1820 and 1825.

After its donation to the city, it suffered several attempts of alteration of its primary goals, which have always been hindered by the government. During the Ragamuffin War the Várzea was outside the city's fortifications, and after the end of the conflict an inspection found several irregularities, such as fences advancing their territory and built a mansion at its center, all was immediately demolished. In the years that followed, government and private individuals tried to split the ground to give it other uses, always finding opposition. In 1870, the Lowland received its first official name, changing its name to Campo do Bonfim, in view of the construction of Capela do Bonfim (Lord Jesus Chapel of the Good End, Chapel Bonfim) on its northern boundary. There were also subsequent threats to the integrity of the area, all frustrated, and in 1872 the President of the Province authorized the construction of a military base in its southeastern limit, being the source of the current Colégio Militar de Porto Alegre (Military School of Porto Alegre).

The site was also used as a drying area for leather, a meeting place for carts and as a deposit of the municipal waste until mid-1890, in spite of contrary opinions Hygiene of the Board of the Province. In 1884 the street had its name changed to Campos da Redenção (Fields of Redemption), celebrating the early abolition of slavery in the city.

In 1927, the actual landscaping of the Campos da Redenção began, with the implementation of the Jardim Paulo Gama garden to the north and the banning of the parade of carts and herds in 1928. In 1935 for the centenary celebrations of the Revolução Farroupilha (Ragamuffin War), the entire southern part of the field was drained, flushed and urbanized, following the designs of French architect Alfred Agache. This year its name was changed to its current name Parque Farroupilha.

== Activities and landmarks ==
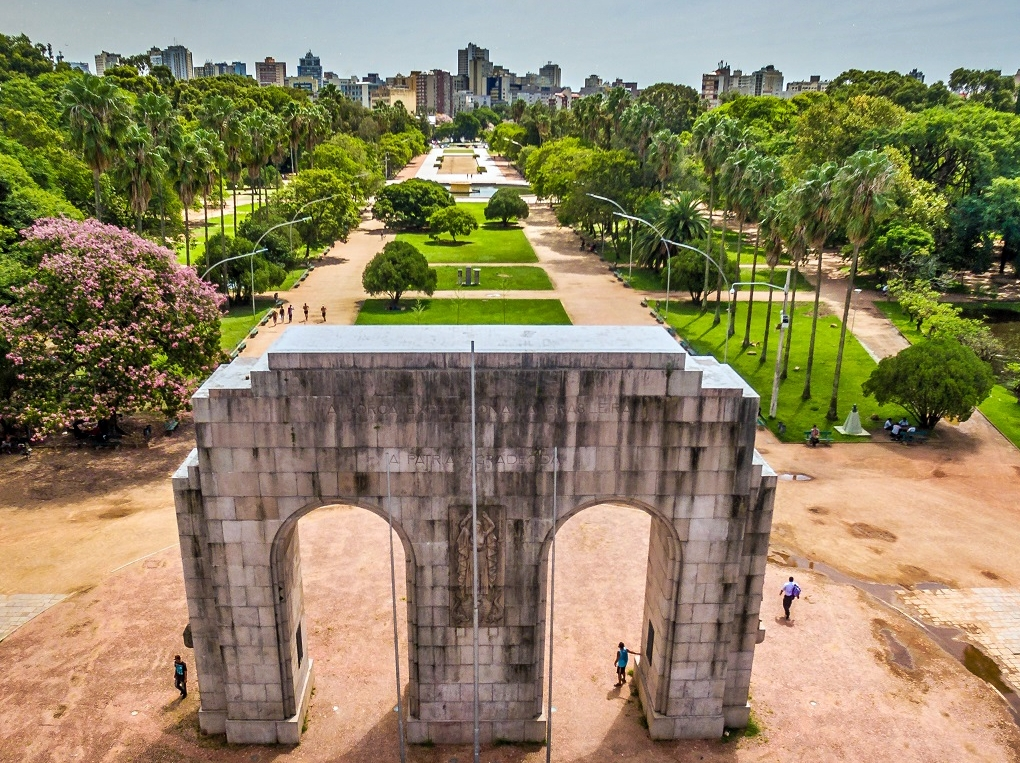
Aerial photo of the Arc of Triumph in Farroupilha Park (2016)

=== Araujo Viana Auditorium ===
Auditorium for concerts, performances and meetings. Designed by architects Moacir Moojen e Carlos Fayet, was inaugurated in March 1964, making it a space for cultural events.

=== Brique da Redenção ===
Every Sunday from 9:00 am the Porto Alegrenses have their favorite outing in Brique da Redenção. There are stalls selling crafts, Arts, Souvenirs, Food and Antiques, all along the Avenida Jose Bonifacio. The Park is full of people walking, talking and taking their mate, especially on sunny mornings. A must for candidates at election time and movements of all types and organizations.

=== Feira Ecológica and Feira de Artesanato ===
Every Saturday, two fairs exhibit their products on Avenida José Bonifácio. There is the Eco-Fair, with several stalls of organic fruits and vegetables at a very good price, and there is the Arts and Crafts Fair, with 60 exhibitors selling their products.

=== Recanto da Ilha ===
The dock in the little lake inside the park was located where now stands the Cafeteria. In 2001, the pier was transferred to the other side, where there is the Belvedere, in the middle of the lake on an island, which is reached through a bridge. Paddle boats can be rented from the wharf at the box office, in March 2004 they were renovated and have buoys and life jackets now. There are boats for 2, 3 and 4 people, some in the shape of swans.

=== Monumento ao Expedicionário ===
Inaugurated on June 16, 1957, the Monument to the Expeditionary, made of granite with a double Arc de Triomphe, with 12.50 m in height, is home to the Pira da Pátria, a point of the celebrations of the Independence of Brazil, September 7, and the Ragamuffin War, on September 20.

After World War II the Brazilian Expeditionary Force members who had fought against the Axis on the Italian front returned to Brazil, and the country multiplied in tribute to the GIs and their deeds. Porto Alegre was no exception, especially as many gaucho soldiers and officers had participated in the war. So in 1946 there was a competition for projects and models of an "Arc de Triomphe" to honor the BEF and its soldiers.

=== Espelho D'Água ===
Located in the Avenue of the States, the water surface suggests tranquility and peace to visitors.

=== Recantos Oriental and Europeu ===
Located on the right of Avenue of the States, the Recanto Oriental is a space for meditation. Formed around a dragon-shaped lake, it has small semi-arc-shaped bridges, a sculpture in the shape of the Fuji-Yama volcano, and a Pagoda where a sculpture of the Buddha is located. Recanto Europeu, in turn, can be found next to Araujo Viana Auditorium, a small space that simulates in a simple way a European garden, with the fountain Fonte Francesa and the Roman Pergola. There are also two other gardens, Recantos Solar e Alpino of lesser notoriety in the park.
