= Alfred Agache =

Alfred Agache may refer to:

- Alfred Agache (painter) (1843–1915), French painter
- Alfred Agache (architect) (1875–1934), French architect and urban designer
