= Clement Seneque =

South African-French painter and architect

Clement Sénèque
- Born: 1896; Phalempin, France
- Died: April 30, 1930 (aged 33–34); Durban, Union of South Africa
- Known for: Painting; Architecture
- Notable work: Durban Bay; The Old Fort; Mont Blanc

Clément Sénèque (14 August 1896 – 30 April 1930) was a painter and architect known for his depiction of natural landscapes and the "awe-inspiring perspective" he brought to paintings of man-made structures.

== Biography ==
Clément Sénèque was born in Mauritius on 14 August 1896 when the island was a British colony. His family moved to Durban, South Africa in 1900, completing his education and serving as an architectural apprentice at a local firm between 1915 and 1921. He then moved to Paris, working as an architect the firm of Alfred Agache. He married his wife Marie Therese L'Hoste on 18 July 1923. Returning to Durban shortly thereafter, he lived and worked as both an artist and architect until his death from pneumonia at the age of 33 on 30 April 1930.

== Career ==
Clément held his first exhibition at La Maison des Artistes in Paris. On his return to Durban, between 1925 and 1930 he rose to prominence, becoming vice-president of the Natal Society of Arts (NSA). Multiple solo exhibitions followed, the most significant of which took place at the Gallery of Johannesburg in 1927.

The Tatham Art Gallery held retrospective exhibitions in 1969 and 1984. A number of galleries in South Africa have his paintings on display.

His work remains popular, with multiple auctions taking place in 2019.

== Works ==
- Mont Blanc - 1923
- Aiguille Du Midi - Village et Glacier des Bossons - 1924
- Les Aiguille de la Glière (at Night) - 1924
