= The Writer (disambiguation) =

The Writer is an American monthly magazine.

The Writer may also refer to:

- The Writer (Israel) an auto-fictional television drama about Sayed Kashua
- "The Writer" (song)
- The Writer (sculpture)
- "The Writer" (The Cleaner), a 2021 television episode
