= Farroupilha Revolution centennial fair =

1935–36 fair in Porto Alegre, Brazil

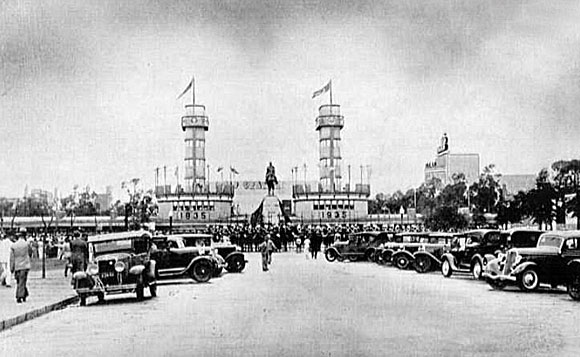
- Inauguration

Overview
- BIE-class: Unrecognized exposition
- Name: Farroupilha Revolution centennial fair
- Area: 250,000 square metres (25 ha)
- Visitors: 1 million
- Organized by: Flores da Cunha, Dário Brossard, Alberto Bins, Mário de Oliveira

Location
- Country: Brazil
- City: Porto Alegre
- Venue: Farroupilha Park
- Coordinates: 30°02′12″S 51°12′57″W

Timeline
- Opening: 20 September 1935
- Closure: 15 January 1936

The Farroupilha Revolution centennial fair was held in Porto Alegre, Rio Grande do Sul, Brazil to mark 100 years since the Farroupilha Revolution (or Ragamuffin War).

== Organisation ==
A general commission for the fair was established on 11 June 1934 and included José Antônio Flores da Cunha, Dário Brossard representing FARSUL (Federação da Agricultura do Estado do Rio Grande do Sul), Alberto Bins as secretary and Mário de Oliveira as secretary general.

It was one of several world and national fairs of the 1930s.

The fair was opened on 20 September 1935 and closed 15 January 1936. During its operation it received around 1 million visitors.

== Location ==
Alfredo Agache under direction from the mayor Alberto Bins had already proposed changes to the Redenção Park including landscaping, addition of a central road and a lake which were realised when the fair was planned. The park was renamed to Farroupilha Park the day before the fair opened, and the fair occupied 250,000 square metres (25 ha)

== Buildings ==
=== State buildings ===
Some Brazilian states had their own pavilions: Pernambuco (designed by Luiz Nunes), São Paulo, Santa Catarina, Paraná, Pará and Amazonas (shared), Minas Gerais Pavilion and the Federal District (then Rio de Janeiro).

Most of the buildings were constructed of wood and plaster and were dismantled in 1939, with the Pará state pavilion which was constructed of masonry surviving until being burned in 1970. Most buildings had an Art Deco style, with the Pará pavilion incorporating Marajoara symbols.

== Other buildings ==
There were theme pavilions: agriculture, foreign industries and railway companies, as well as buildings for entertainment: a casino, restaurant and coffee bar. The foreign industries pavilion occupied 2,000 square metres (0.20 ha) and had 177 exhibitors whilst Rio Grande de Sol's own industrial pavilion took 14,000 square metres (1.4 ha) and had 905 exhibitors.

== Amusement park ==
There was an amusement park with a rowing lake (the dock of which was retained and in use as a cafe in 2010), a Lotto pavilion, tobogganing and a rollercoaster.

== Commemoration ==
A set of four postage stamps were produced to mark the fair.
