= The Case of the Stick =

Short story by Joaquim Maria Machado de Assis

- Short story by Joaquim Maria Machado de Assis
- Original title: O caso da vara

Publication
- Published in: Gazeta de Notícias
- Publication date: 1891

"The Case of the Stick" (Portuguese: O caso da vara) is an 1891 short story by Brazilian writer Joaquim Maria Machado de Assis, published first in the Gazeta de Notícias and republished in the book Páginas Recolhidas. It is an ironic depiction of slavery in Brazil (abolished in 1888) and selfishness. The story's title is sometimes translated into English as "The Punishment Case", or "The Cane"; it appears under the latter in A Chapter of Hats and Other Stories, a collection of Machado's short stories published in Great Britain by Bloomsbury Publishing in 2008.

== Plot summary ==
Damião (pronounced Da-mi-ow) is a young man who escapes from a seminary. Afraid that if he returns home, his father will force him to return to the seminary, he goes to ask help of Miss Rita, a widow and the lover of Damião's godfather, João Carneiro. She agrees to help him, and he hides in her house, where she has a number of girls working for her.

When Rita asks why he does not speak with his father, Damião tells Rita that his father does not listen to anyone. Rita suggests that he seek help from his godfather. At first, Damião resists, but eventually agrees, and João Carneiro is sent for.

While they wait for João Carneiro at Rita's house, Damião tells jokes to the girls. In one of them, a slave named Lucrécia, is distracted from her work. Seeing this, Rita threatens to beat Lucrécia with a stick, the usual punishment, if she does not finish her work. Feeling sympathy for the small scared black girl Damião decides that if Lucrécia does not finish the work, he will try to protect her, but says nothing.

João Carneiro arrives and Rita tries to convince him to intercede with Damião's father. She is insistent, and sends him off. Then she tells Damião to go eat dinner.

Some local women come to Rita's house for coffee and conversation. After the women leave later in the day, Damião becomes increasingly nervous and, certain that if he remains at Rita's house, his father will find him and send him back to the seminary, he decides to try to escape. Clad in a chasuble, he begs Rita for some plain clothing. Laughing, she tells him to relax, and that everything will turn out well. But soon a note from João arrives with the news that the father is unconvinced. Damião sees that Rita is his only hope. She takes a pen and paper and writes a note to João telling him that if he cannot convince the father, they will never see each other again.

Then Rita goes to the collect the work from the girls. Seeing that Lucrécia has not finished her work, she takes Lucrécia by the ear and tells Damião to fetch the stick. He is torn between his desire to help the girl, who begs him for help, and his desire to escape the seminary, he feels remorse, but gives Miss Rita the stick.
