= Société française des urbanistes =

The Société française des Urbanistes (SFU; English: French Society of Urban Planners) is a French national association of urban planners formed in 1911, in part by city planner Alfred Agache.
