= A Mão e a Luva =

Book by Joaquim Maria Machado de Assis

- Author: Machado de Assis
- Language: Portuguese
- Publication date: 1874
- Publication place: Brazil
- Pages: 160
- ISBN: 978-85-380-0351-9

A Mão e a Luva (The Hand and the Glove) is a romance novel written by Brazilian author Machado de Assis (1839–1908) and published in 1874. The book is a psychological analysis of society and of false naivety.

== Story ==
The story revolves around Guiomar, a seventeen-year-old girl, goddaughter to a baroness. Guiomar wishes to raise her position in Carioca society and is sought after by three men: Jorge, Estêvão and Luís Alves. Estêvão loves her crazily, purely and innocently; she is his first love. Jorge, nephew to the baroness and her obvious favorite, sees Guiomar as a path to social climbing, and has "a lustful kind of love". Luís Alves is a middle-term: his intentions are of an ambitious nature, but throughout the book he gradually becomes fond of Guiomar.

Jorge, with the support of the baroness and her British maid, Mrs. Oswald, requests Guiomar's hand in marriage. On the following day, Luís Alves asks as well. The baroness leaves the decision in the hands of Guiomar, who chooses Jorge, but the baroness knows she actually wants to marry Luís Alves. She actually marries Luís Alves and the end of the book justifies the title.

== Bibliography ==
- Machado de Assis, Joaquim Maria. A Mão e a Luva. L&M Pocket, 1999
