= Adriana Janacópulos =

Brazilian sculptor

- Born: 1897; Rio de Janeiro, Brazil
- Known for: Sculpture
- Spouse(s): Alexandre Wolkowyski - unknown wedding date, ending in divorce in 1926

Adriana Janacópulos (1897 - c. 1978) was a 20th-century Brazilian sculptor.

== Biography ==
Adriana Janacopulos was born in Petrópolis Rio de Janeiro in 1897. Of Greek descent, she was the niece of the politician Pandiá Calógeras. After the death of her mother, Adriana moved to Paris with her sister Vera, who would become a lyric singer.

In Paris, Janacopulos studied sculpture with Léo Laporte-Blairsy, Raoul Larche and Antoine Bourdelle and befriended Amedeo Modigliani, Jacques Lipchitz and artists from the Russian colony.

She married the Russian sculptor, Alexandre Wolkowyski, with whom she had two daughters.

When World War I broke out, the Janacopulos sisters moved to Belgium and then to Geneva, Switzerland. After the end of the war, she returned to Paris, exhibiting her works in several artistic salons, such as the Salon d'Automne, and the Tuileries. She lived with the Brazilian artists of modernism, such as Anita Malfatti, Victor Brecheret and Di Cavalcanti, participating in the Latin American Art Exhibition of 1924 (Exposição de Arte Latino-Americana de 1924).

Janacópulos divorced Wolkowyski in 1926. She continued to exhibit in Paris until she returned to Brazil in 1932. With the support of her uncle and the Association of Brazilian Artists, Janacopulos exhibited her first and only solo exhibition in Brazil at the Palace Hotel in Rio. The exhibition was attended by artists and politicians.

She went on to receive commissions from individuals and government agencies. She sculpted the tomb of the poet Felipe d'Oliveira in 1933 and in 1935 made three monuments in honor of the dead of the Constitutionalist Revolution of 1932 for the faculties of law, medicine and engineering of the University of São Paulo.

In 1938 Janacópulos received a commission from the Ministry of Education and Health, to sculpt a work for the Gustavo Capanema Palace. She participated in the first São Paulo Art Biennial, in 1951.

After the death of Vera in 1955, Adriana honored her sister with a bust, inaugurated in 1958 in Paris Square, in Rio de Janeiro.
