= Esau and Jacob (novel) =

Book by Joaquim Maria Machado de Assis

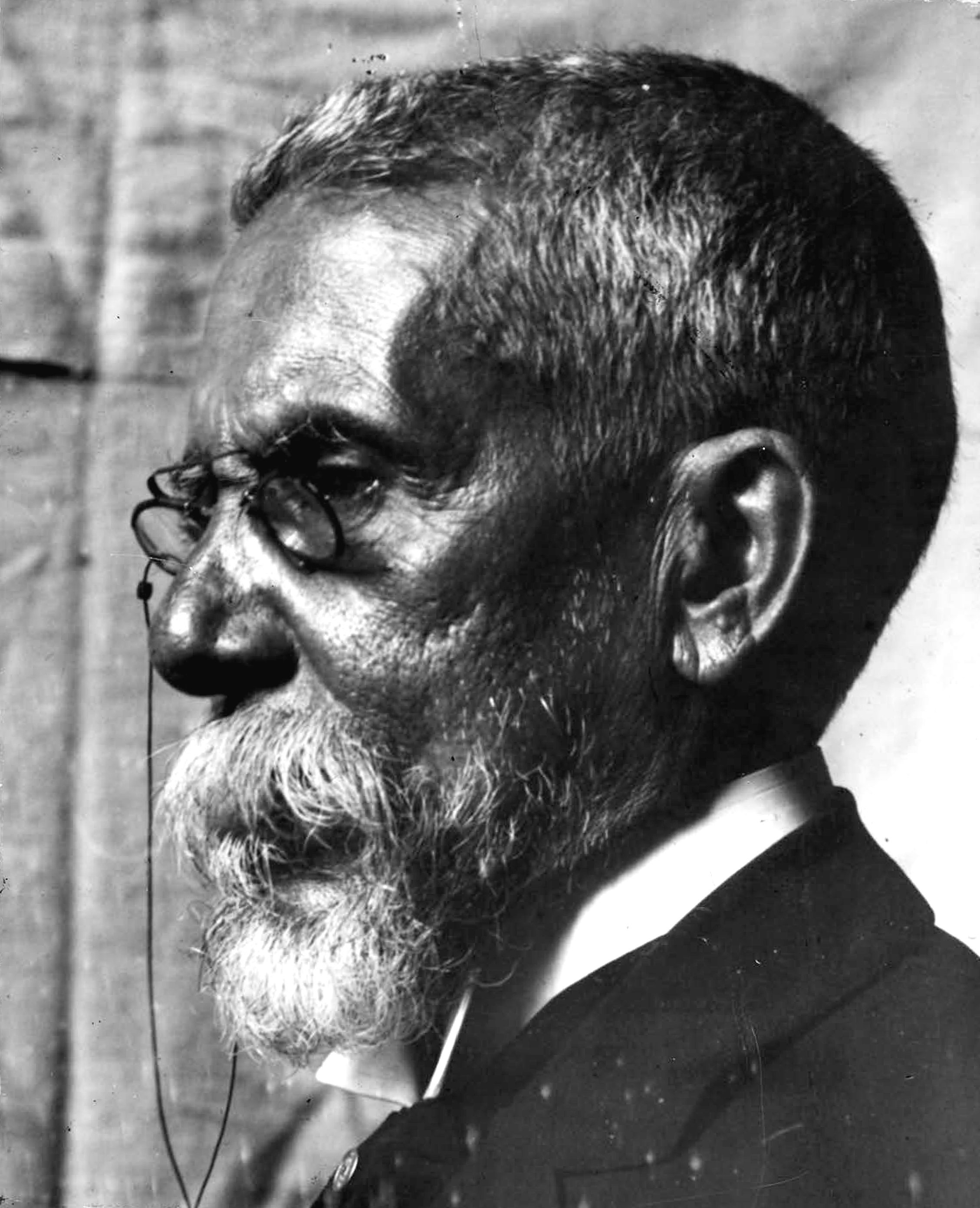
Machado de Assis in 1904. Brazilian National Archives

Esau and Jacob (Portuguese:Esaú e Jacó) is a Machado de Assis novel launched in 1904, four years before his death, by Editora Garnier, and, according to most critics, in full literary heyday, after writing, in 1899, Dom Casmurro, the most famous from his books. Esaú e Jacó stand out for consolidating a "smooth mastery" in the domain of the plot. Machado takes advantage of the occasional eccentricity in a text that leaves behind traces of picaresque and embarks on a realism that resumes the melancholy and lyricism that had begun in the first phase of his literary production. Highlighted are the characters very close to real life.

The narrative begins with Conselheiro Aires, character and narrator, who, however, is also seen from a third person. He plays opposite Natividade, mother of twins Pedro and Paulo, who star in the novel. And Machado reaches almost formal perfection by establishing the fascinating plot where the protagonists are opposed and competing. They disagree in politics, in life, always in opposite fields, against each other, since Paulo is a republican and enters law school, while Pedro is a monarchist and is studying medicine, but they even court the same woman who is indecisive between them.

== Plot ==
Esaú e Jacó begins with the visit of Natividade, pregnant with twins, and her sister, Perpétua, to a cabocla in Morro do Castelo. The future mother wanted to know the fate of her twin sons, Pedro and Paulo. The prediction of the cabocla is encouraging, as she says that they will be big. This, however, is not enough to undo the restlessness of Natividade, who worries about the possible fights of the brothers still in the womb.

Upon arriving home, the woman reports the predictions to Santos, her husband. Pedro and Paulo grow physically identical, but completely different in personality. Paulo, a republican, enters law school, and Pedro, a monarchist, is studying medicine. Both are enchanted by Flora, daughter of the opportunist politician Batista and Dª Cláudia. With the appointment of Batista as president of a northern province, the young woman, divided among the twins, despairs, without wanting to leave Rio. With the Proclamation of the Republic, the girl ends up staying in the city. However, still undecided, she decided to go to the house of Rita, sister of Conselheiro Aires, and thus have more time to choose one of the brothers. Before deciding, the young woman falls ill and dies. The brothers suffer, but they soon begin their careers.

The two face each other in political life as deputies on opposite sides of parliament. With Natividade's death, given her last request, disagreements cease. Peace is short lived, so the brothers exchange barbs and end up separated.

=== Characteristics ===
Machado de Assis, throughout his work, never failed to touch on issues of a social nature, in a profound and ironically biting manner. It is in the narrative of Esaú and Jacó, however, that the Wizard of Cosme Velho goes deep in the criticism of the country's political conformation, denouncing the set of interests that preceded the proclamation of the republic in Brazil.

What is most significant in his work is the way in which he exploits this apparent political divergence to transcend simply political criticism. In this way, he manages to reach the aesthetic treatment of the question of falsely contradictory dualisms, but which are nothing more than appearance.

Manuscript of the book Esau and Jacob In the book, the author also deals, in a very subtle way, with the conflict between faith, science and religion, in vogue at the beginning of the century. At the time, the discoveries of experimental science, the advent of materialism and the redefinition of man ended up causing a sense of disenchantment, instilling desperate skepticism.

In the first chapters, the conflict presented, albeit ironically mild, revolves around belief. It can be inferred that, between the spaces of belief (the cabocla shack and the church), spiritism is placed in the figure of Plácido, as an attempt to establish the union between faith and science, which, due to the emptiness of their positions, does not is achieved.

Machado, a relativist, shows that man's destiny remains a matter of faith, both for religion and for science itself. The same occurs with the republic and monarchy, since the dispute between the two is raised here as a mere party issue, of interest to political groups that are not different in appearance and represent a mere exchange of power. Pay attention to how Machado composes Pedro and Paulo in this perspective, different, but analogous, and how, in this game of contradictions, Flora, Brazil's metonymy, gets confused and languishes. The narrator's direct dialogue with the reader accentuates his awareness of version, of fiction.
