= Machado de Assis =

Brazilian writer (1839–1908)

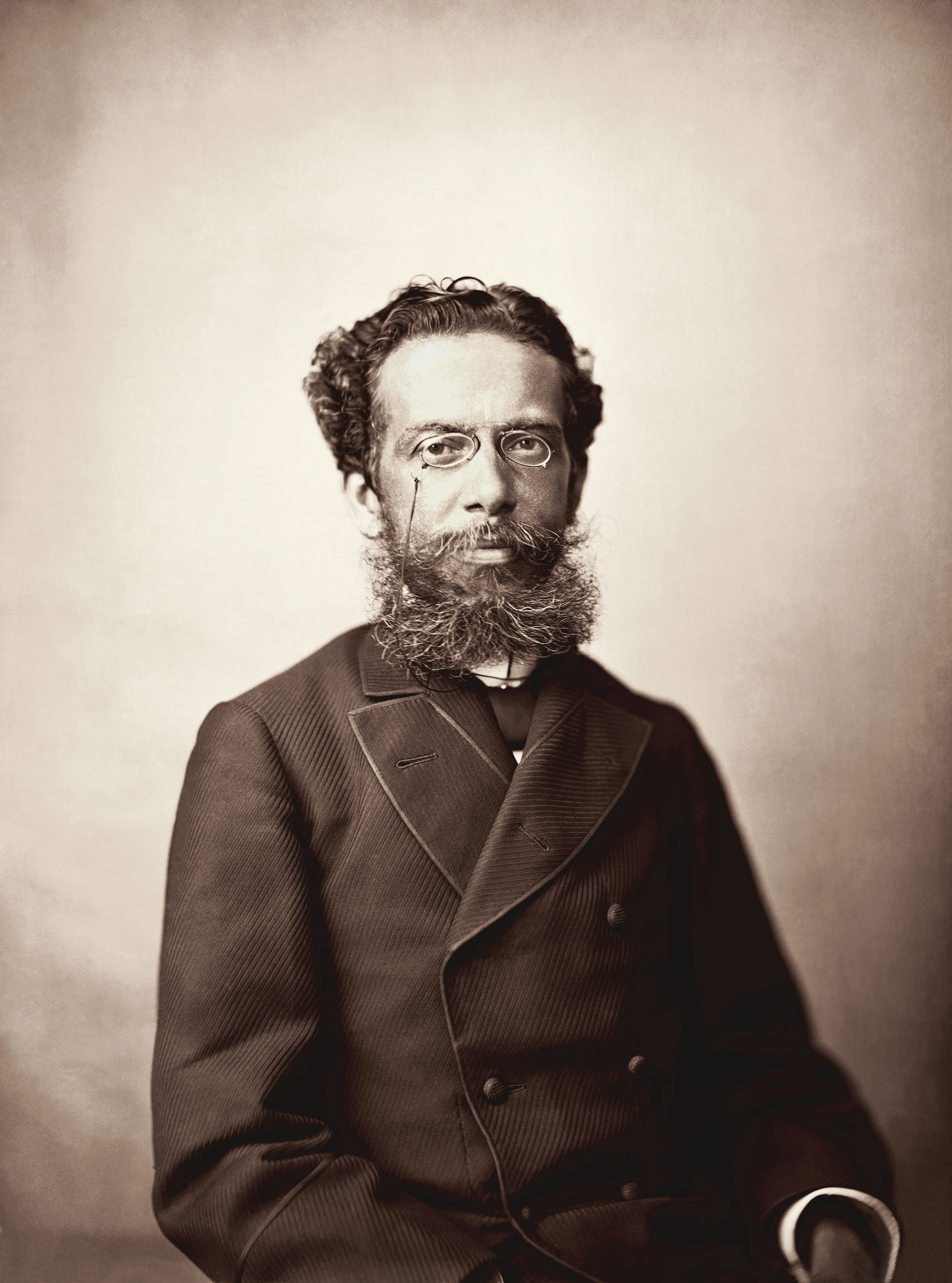
- Picture by Marc Ferrez, c. 1880

1st President of the Brazilian Academy of Letters
- In office 28 January 1897 – 29 September 1908
- Preceded by: Position established
- Succeeded by: Ruy Barbosa

Personal details
- Born: Joaquim Maria Machado de Assis; 21 June 1839 Rio de Janeiro, Empire of Brazil
- Died: 29 September 1908 (aged 69) Rio de Janeiro, First Brazilian Republic
- Spouse: Carolina Augusta Xavier de Novais (m. 1869; died 1904)
- Occupation: Novelist, short story writer, poet, literary critic
- Period: 1864–1908
- Movement: Romanticism, Realism
- Influences: See list: Camões • Vieira • Mattos • Alencar • Almeida Garrett • Schopenhauer • Spinoza • Victor Hugo • Poe • La Rochefoucauld • Goethe • Swift • Sterne • Lucian of Samosata • Voltaire • Shakespeare • Dante • Cervantes
- Influenced: See list: John Barth • Carlos Drummond de Andrade • Cyro dos Anjos • Graciliano Ramos • Murilo Rubião • João Guimarães Rosa • Jorge Amado • Érico Verissimo • José Saramago • Rubem Braga • João Cabral de Melo Neto • Vinicius de Moraes • Mário de Andrade • Manuel Bandeira • Chico Buarque de Holanda • Jorge de Lima • Joaquim Nabuco • Plínio Salgado • Gilberto Freire • Gustavo Corção
- Other names: Machado, "The Warlock from Cosme Velho"
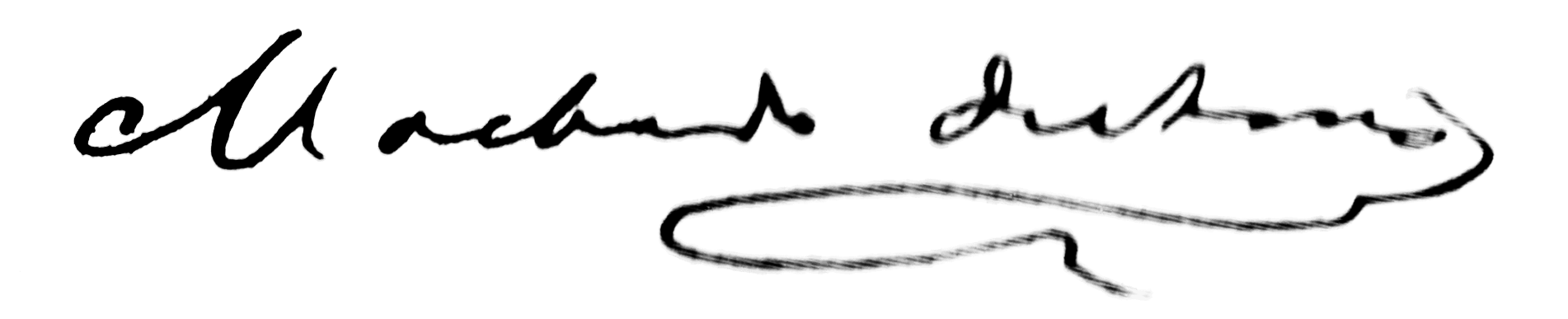
- Signature

Joaquim Maria Machado de Assis (Portuguese: [ʒwɐˈkĩ maˈɾiɐ maˈʃadu d͡ʒ(i) aˈsis]), sometimes called Bruxo do Cosme Velho (21 June 1839 – 29 September 1908), was a pioneer Brazilian novelist, poet, playwright and short story writer, widely regarded as the greatest writer of Brazilian literature. In 1897, he founded and became the first President of the Brazilian Academy of Letters. He was multilingual, having taught himself French, English, German and Greek later in life.

Born in Morro do Livramento, Rio de Janeiro, from a poor family, Machado was the grandson of freed slaves in a country where slavery would not be fully abolished until 49 years later. He barely studied in public schools and never attended university. With only his own intellect and autodidactism to rely on, he struggled to rise socially. To do so, he took several public positions, passing through the Ministry of Agriculture, Trade and Public Works, and achieving early fame in newspapers where he first published his poetry and chronicles.

Machado's work shaped the realist movement in Brazil. He became known for his wit and his eye-opening critiques of society. Generally considered to be Machado's greatest works are Dom Casmurro (1899), Memórias Póstumas de Brás Cubas ("Posthumous Memoirs of Brás Cubas", also translated as Epitaph of a Small Winner) and Quincas Borba (also known in English as Philosopher or Dog?). In 1893, he published "A Missa do Galo" ("Midnight Mass"), often considered to be the greatest short story in Brazilian literature.

== Biography ==
=== Birth and adolescence ===
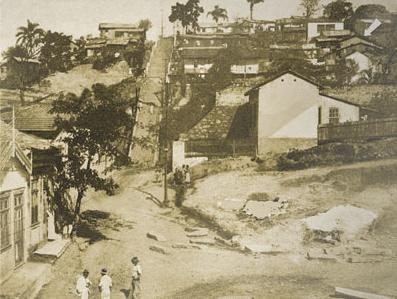
Morro do Livramento. The arrow in the top right corner shows the house where Machado was probably born and spent his childhood.

Joaquim Maria Machado de Assis was born on 21 June 1839 in Rio de Janeiro, then capital of the Empire of Brazil. His parents were Francisco José de Assis, a wall painter, the son of freed slaves, and Maria Leopoldina da Câmara Machado, a Portuguese washerwoman from the Azores. He was born in Livramento country house, owned by Dona Maria José de Mendonça Barroso Pereira, widow of senator Bento Barroso Pereira, who protected his parents and allowed them to live with her. Dona Maria José became Joaquim's godmother; her brother-in-law, commendator Joaquim Alberto de Sousa da Silveira, was his godfather, and both were paid homage by giving their names to the baby. Machado had a sister who died young. Joaquim studied in a public school, but was not a good student. While helping to serve the masses, he met Father Silveira Sarmento, who became his Latin teacher and also a good friend.

When Joaquim was ten years old, his mother died, and his father took him along as he moved to São Cristóvão. Francisco de Assis met Maria Inês da Silva, and they married in 1854. Joaquim had classes in a school for girls only, thanks to his stepmother who worked there making candies. At night he learned French with an immigrant baker. In his adolescence, he met Francisco de Paula Brito, who owned a bookstore, a newspaper and typography. On 12 January 1855, Francisco de Paula published the poem Ela ("Her") written by Joaquim, then 15 years old, in the newspaper Marmota Fluminense. In the following year, he was hired as typographer's apprentice in the Imprensa Oficial (the Official Press, charged with the publication of Government measures), where he was encouraged as a writer by Manuel Antônio de Almeida, the newspaper's director and also a novelist. There he also met Francisco Otaviano, journalist and later liberal senator, and Quintino Bocaiuva, who decades later would become known for his role as a republican orator.

=== Early career and education ===
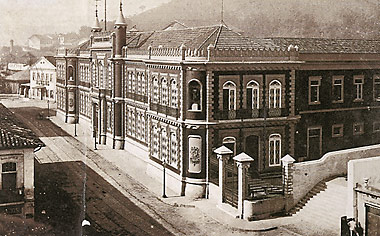
National Press, c. 1880, where Machado de Assis began his services as typographer and proofreader.

Francisco Otaviano hired Machado to work on the newspaper Correio Mercantil as a proofreader in 1858. He continued to write for the Marmota Fluminense and also for several other newspapers, but he did not earn much and had a humble life. As he did not live with his father anymore, it was common for him to eat only once a day for lack of money.

Around this time, he became a friend of the writer and liberal politician José de Alencar, who taught him English. From English literature, he was influenced by Laurence Sterne, William Shakespeare, Lord Byron and Jonathan Swift. He learned German years later and in his old age, Greek. He was invited by Bocaiúva to work at his newspaper Diário do Rio de Janeiro in 1860. Machado had a passion for theater and wrote several plays for a short time; his friend Bocaiúva concluded: "Your works are meant to be read and not played." He gained some notability and began to sign his writings as J. M. Machado de Assis, the way he would be known for posterity: Machado de Assis. He established himself in advanced Liberal Party circles by taking stands in defense of religious freedom and Ernest Renan's controversial Life of Jesus while attacking the venality of the clergy.

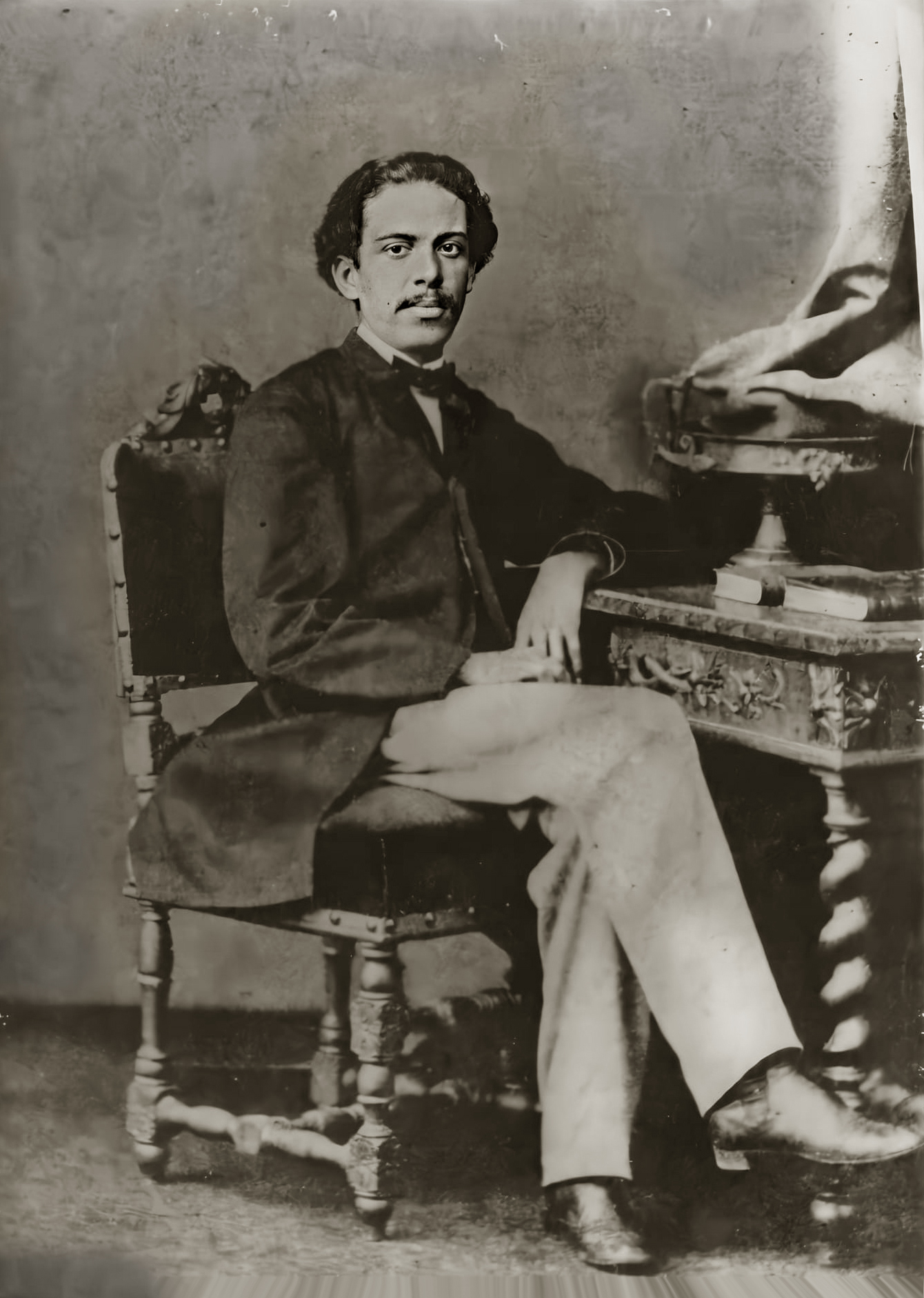
Machado de Assis when he was 25 years old, 1864.

His father, Francisco de Assis, died in 1864. Machado learned of his father's death through acquaintances. He dedicated his compilation of poems called "Crisálidas" to his father: "To the Memory of Francisco José de Assis and Maria Leopoldina Machado de Assis, my Parents." With the Liberal Party's ascension to power at that time, Machado thought he might receive a patronage position that would help him improve his life. To his surprise, aid came from the Emperor Dom Pedro II, who hired him as director-assistant in the Diário Oficial in 1867, and knighted him as an honor. In 1888 Machado was made an officer of the Order of the Rose.

=== Marriage and family ===
In 1868 Machado met the Portuguese Carolina Augusta Xavier de Novais, five years older than he was. She was the sister of his colleague Faustino Xavier de Novais, for whom he worked on the magazine O Futuro. Machado had a stammer and was extremely shy, short and lean. He was also very intelligent and well-learned. He married Carolina on 12 November 1869; although her parents, Miguel and Adelaide, and her siblings disapproved because Machado was of African descent and she was a white woman. They had no children.

=== Literature ===
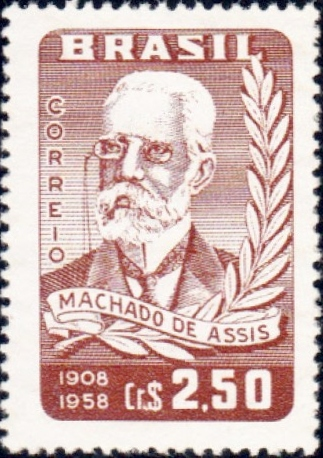
Stamp depicting Machado de Assis

Machado managed to rise in his bureaucratic career, first in the Agriculture Department. Three years later, he became the head of a section in it. He published two poetry books: Falenas, in 1870, and Americanas, in 1875. Their weak reception made him explore other literary genres.

He wrote five romantic novels: Ressurreição, A Mão e a Luva, Helena and Iaiá Garcia. The books were a success with the public, but literary critics considered them mediocre. Machado suffered repeated attacks of epilepsy, apparently related to the hearing of the death of his old friend José de Alencar. He was left melancholic, pessimistic and fixed on death. His next book, marked by "a skeptical and realistic tone": Memórias Póstumas de Brás Cubas (Posthumous Memoirs of Brás Cubas, also translated as Epitaph of a Small Winner), is widely considered a masterpiece. By the end of the 1880s, Machado had gained wide renown as a writer.

Although he was opposed to slavery, he never spoke against it in public. He avoided discussing politics. He was criticized by the abolitionist José do Patrocínio and by the writer Lima Barreto for staying away from politics, especially the cause of abolition. He was also criticized by them for having married a white woman. Machado was caught by surprise with the monarchy overthrown on 15 November 1889. Machado had no sympathy towards republicanism, as he considered himself a liberal monarchist and venerated Pedro II, whom he perceived as "a humble, honest, well-learned and patriotic man, who knew how to make a chair of his throne [for his simplicity], without diminishing its greatness and respect." When a commission went to the public office where he worked to remove the picture of the former emperor, the shy Machado defied them: "The picture got in here by an order and it shall leave only by another order."

The birth of the Brazilian republic made Machado become more critical and an observer of the Brazilian society of his time. From then on, he wrote "not only the greatest novels of his time, but the greatest of all time of Brazilian literature." Works such as Quincas Borba (Philosopher or Dog?) (1891), Dom Casmurro (1899), Esaú e Jacó (1904) and Memorial de Aires (1908), considered masterpieces, were successes with both critics and the public. In 1893 he published "A Missa do Galo" ("Midnight Mass"), considered his greatest short story.

=== Later years ===
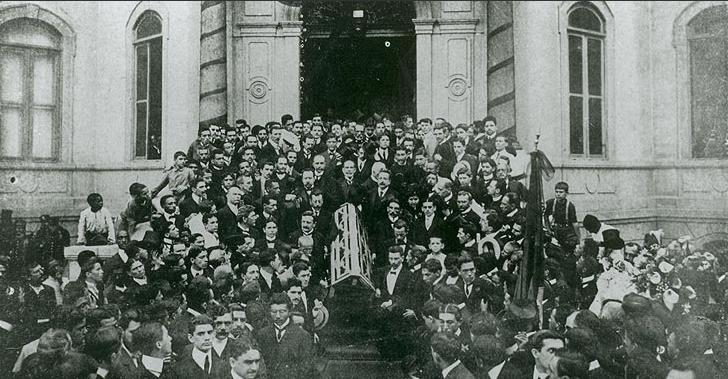
Students and friends, among them Euclides da Cunha, leave the Academy carrying the coffin of Machado de Assis to the Cemetery St. John the Baptist, 1908.

Machado de Assis, along with fellow monarchists such as Joaquim Nabuco, Manuel de Oliveira Lima, Afonso Celso, Viscount of Ouro Preto and Alfredo d'Escragnolle Taunay, and other writers and intellectuals, founded the Brazilian Academy of Letters. He was its first president, from 1897 to 1908, when he died. For many years, he requested that the government grant a proper headquarters to the Academy, which he managed to obtain in 1905. In 1902 he was transferred to the accountancy's directing board of the Ministry of Industry.

His wife Carolina Novais died on 20 October 1904, after 35 years of a "perfect married life". Feeling depressed and lonely, Machado died on 29 September 1908.

== Narrative style ==
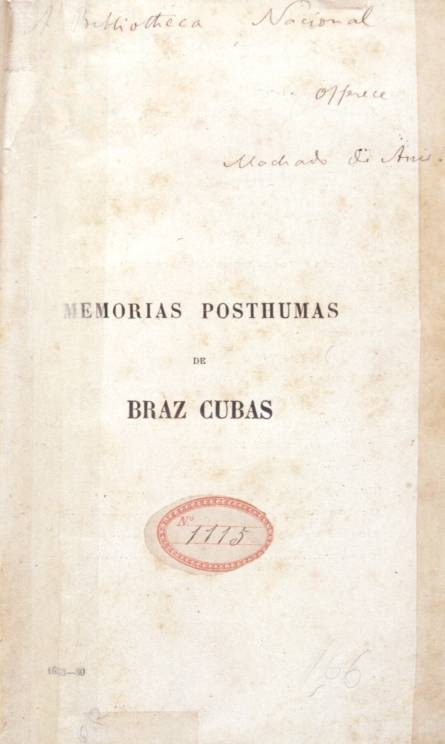
Volume of The Posthumous Memoirs of Bras Cubas dedicated by the author himself to the National Library of Brazil.

Machado's style is unique, and several literary critics have tried to describe it since 1897. He is considered by many the greatest Brazilian writer of all time, and one of the world's greatest novelists and short story writers. His chronicles do not share the same status. His poems are often misunderstood for the use of crude terms, sometimes associated to the pessimist style of Augusto dos Anjos, another Brazilian writer. Machado de Assis was included on American literary critic Harold Bloom's list of the greatest 100 geniuses of literature, alongside writers such as Dante, Shakespeare and Cervantes. Bloom considers him the greatest black writer in Western literature; although, in Brazil, Machado is perceived as a Pardo.

His works have been studied by critics in various countries of the world, such as Giuseppe Alpi (Italy), Lourdes Andreassi (Portugal), Albert Bagby Jr. (US), Abel Barros Baptista (Portugal), Hennio Morgan Birchal (Brazil), Edoardo Bizzarri (Italy), Jean-Michel Massa (France), Helen Caldwell (US), John Gledson (England), Adrien Delpech (France), Albert Dessau (Germany), Paul B. Dixon (US), Keith Ellis (US), Edith Fowke (Canada), Anatole France (France), Richard Graham (US), Pierre Hourcade (France), David Jackson (US), G. Reginald Daniel (US), Linda Murphy Kelley (US), John C. Kinnear, Alfred Mac Adam (US), Victor Orban (France), Daphne Patai (US), Houwens Post (Italy), Samuel Putnam (US), John Hyde Schmitt, Tony Tanner (England), Jack E. Tomlins (US), Carmelo Virgillo (US), Dieter Woll (Germany), August Willemsen (Netherlands) and Susan Sontag (US).

Critics are divided as to the nature of Machado de Assis's writing. Some, such as Abel Barros Baptista, classify Machado as a staunch anti-realist, and argue that his writing attacks Realism, aiming to negate the possibility of representation or the existence of a meaningful objective reality. Realist critics such as John Gledson are more likely to regard Machado's work as a faithful description of Brazilian reality—but one executed with daring innovative technique. In light of Machado's own statements, Daniel argues that Machado's novels represent a growing sophistication and daring in maintaining a dialogue between the aesthetic subjectivism of Romanticism (and its offshoots) and the aesthetic objectivism of Realism-Naturalism. Accordingly, Machado's earlier novels have more in common with a hybrid mid-19th-century current often referred to as "Romantic Realism." In addition, his later novels have more in common with another late 19th-century hybrid: literary Impressionism. Historians such as Sidney Chalhoub argue that Machado's prose constitutes an exposé of the social, political and economic dysfunction of late Imperial Brazil. Critics agree on how he used innovative techniques to reveal the contradictions of his society. Roberto Schwarz points out that Machado's innovations in prose narrative are used to expose the hypocrisies, contradictions, and dysfunction of 19th-century Brazil. Schwarz argues that Machado inverts many narrative and intellectual conventions to reveal the pernicious ends to which they are used. Thus critics reinterpret Machado according to their own designs or their perception of how best to validate him for their own historical moment. Regardless, his incisive prose shines through, able to communicate with readers from different times and places, conveying his ironic and yet tender sense of what we, as human beings, are.

Machado's literary style has inspired many Brazilian writers. His works have been adapted to television, theater, and cinema. In 1975 the Comissão Machado de Assis ("Machado de Assis Commission"), organized by the Brazilian Ministry of Education and Culture, organized and published critical editions of Machado's works, in 15 volumes. His main works have been translated into many languages. Great 20th-century writers such as Salman Rushdie, Cabrera Infante and Carlos Fuentes, as well as the American film director Woody Allen, have expressed their enthusiasm for his fiction. Despite the efforts and patronage of such well-known intellectuals as Susan Sontag, Harold Bloom, and Elizabeth Hardwick, Machado's books—the most famous of which are available in English in multiple translations—have never achieved large sales in the English-speaking world and he continues to be relatively unknown, even by comparison with other Latin American writers.

In his works, Machado appeals directly to the reader, breaking the so-called fourth wall.

== List of works ==
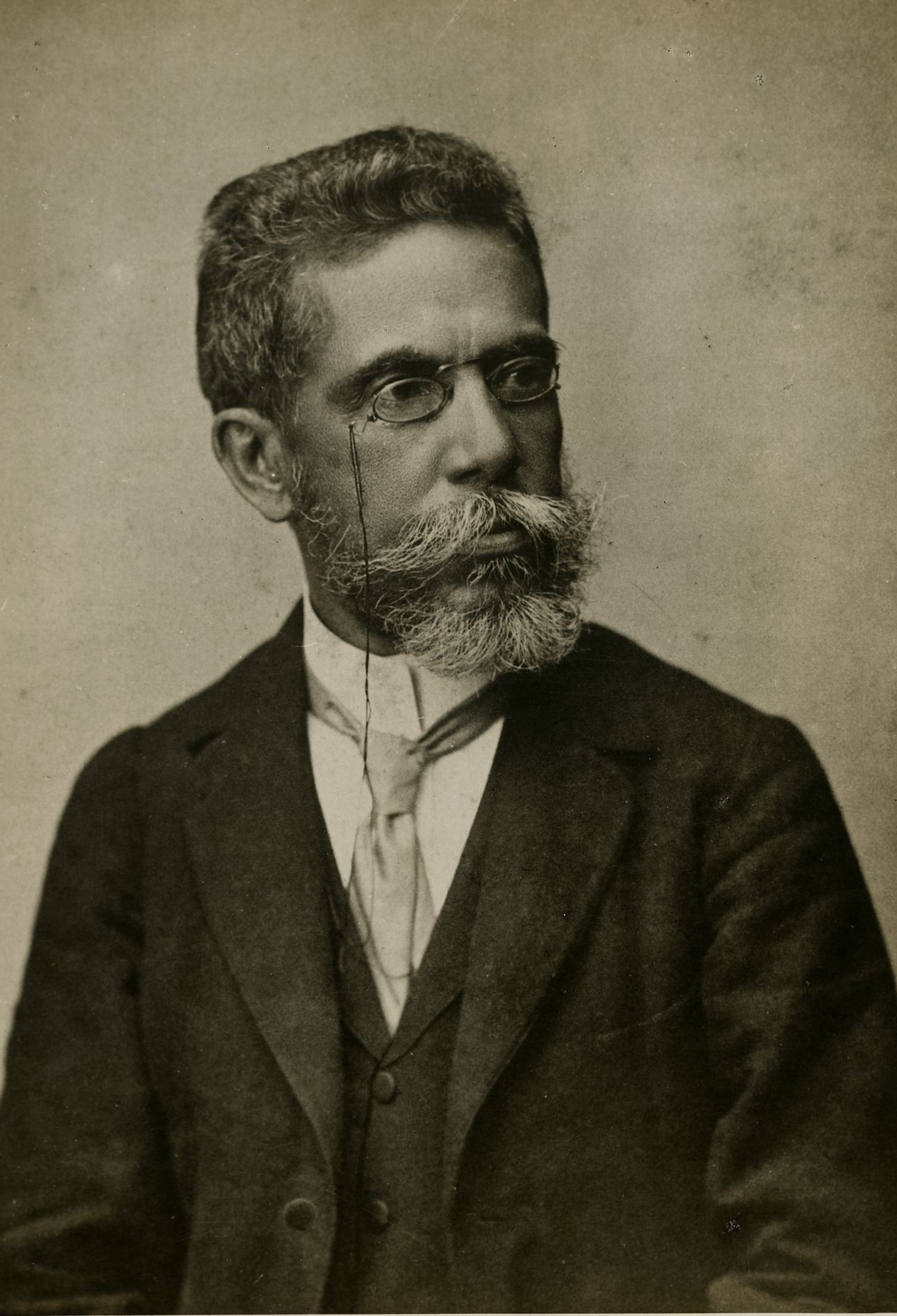
Machado de Assis around age 57, c. 1896

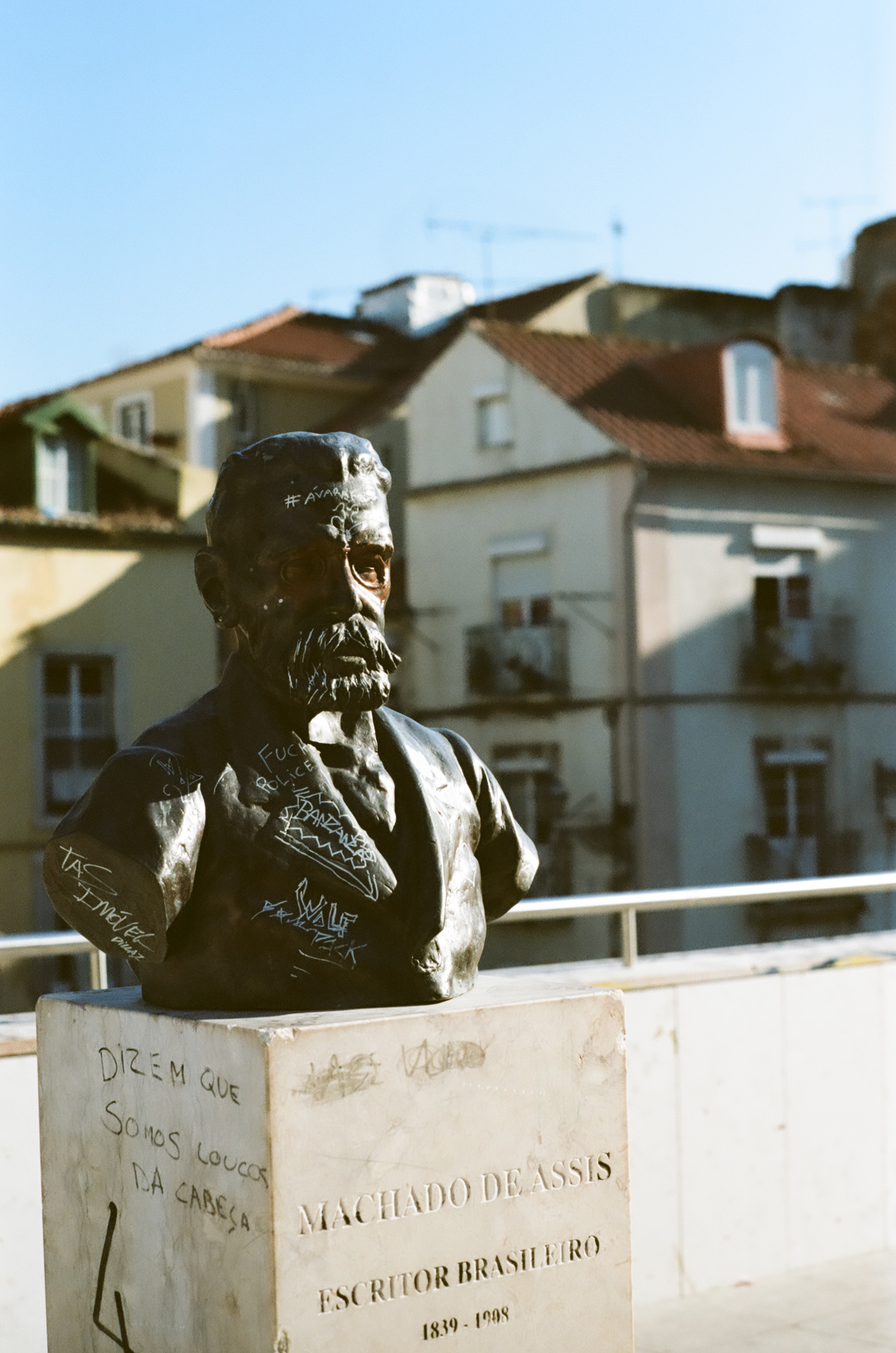
Bust in Lisbon

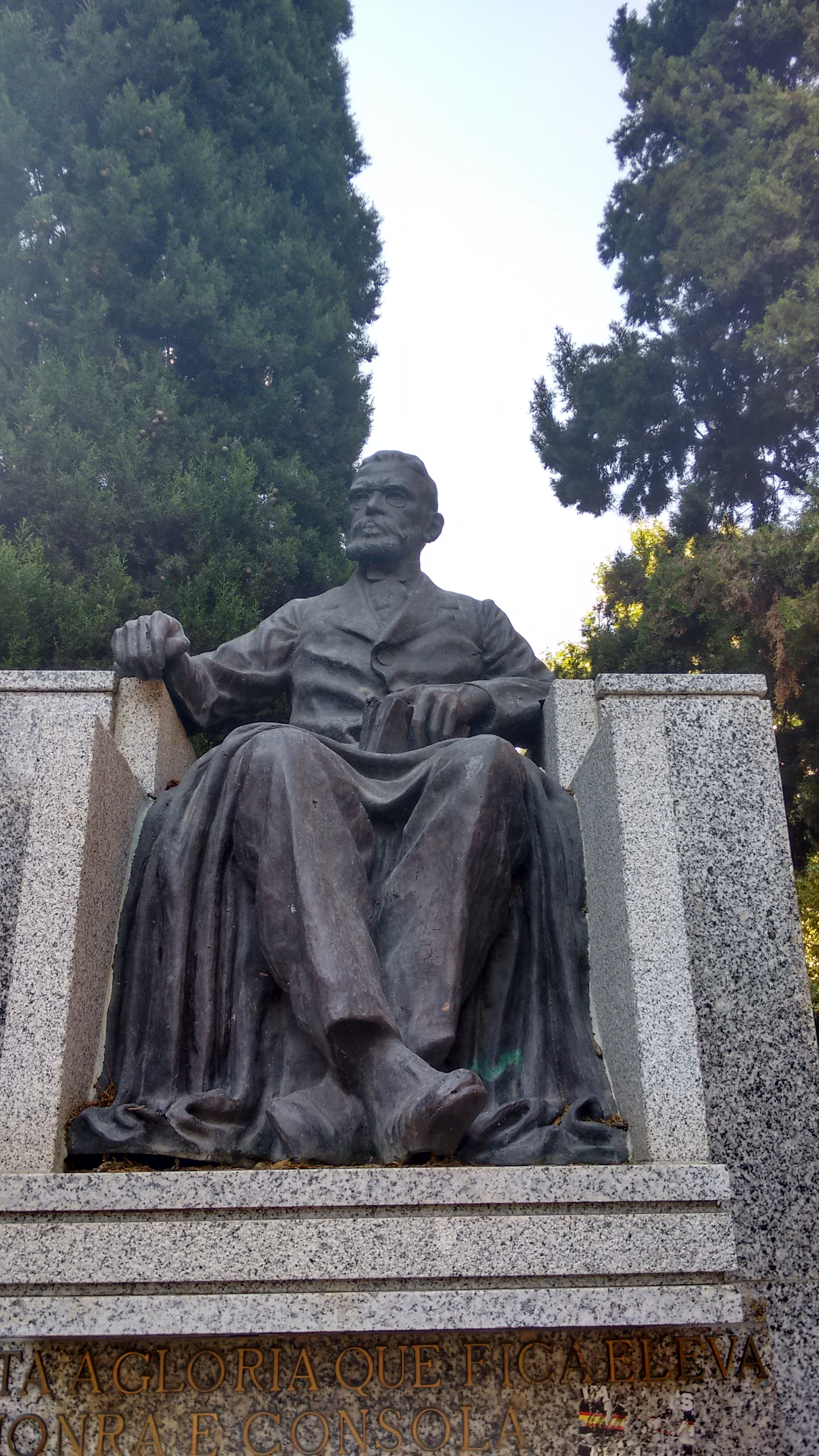
Statue in Madrid, Spain, inaugurated in 1998, replica of the statue made by Humberto Cozzo in 1929 for the Brazilian Academy of Letters in Rio de Janeiro

=== Novels ===
- 1872 – Ressurreição (Resurrection)
- 1874 – A Mão e a Luva (The Hand and the Glove)
- 1876 – Helena
- 1878 – Iaiá Garcia
- 1881 – Memórias Póstumas de Brás Cubas (The Posthumous Memoirs of Bras Cubas, also known in English as Epitaph of a Small Winner)
- 1891 – Quincas Borba (also known in English as Philosopher or Dog?)
- 1899 – Dom Casmurro
- 1904 – Esaú e Jacó (Esau and Jacob)
- 1908 – Memorial de Aires (Counselor Ayres' Memorial)

=== Novellas ===
- 1881 – O alienista (The Psychiatrist, or The Alienist)
- 1886 – Casa velha (published as a book in 1944)

=== Plays ===
- 1860 – Hoje avental, amanhã luva
- 1861 – Desencantos
- 1863 – O caminho da porta and O protocolo (two plays)
- 1864 – Quase ministro
- 1865 – As Forcas Caudinas (published 1956)
- 1866 – Os deuses de casaca
- 1878 – A Sonâmbula, Antes da Missa and O bote de rapé (three short plays)
- 1881 – Tu, só tu, puro amor
- 1896 – Não consultes médico
- 1906 – Lição de botânica

=== Poetry ===
- 1864 – Crisálidas
- 1870 – Falenas (including the dramatic poem Uma ode de anacreonte)
- 1875 – Americanas
- 1901 – Ocidentais
- 1901 – Poesias Completas (complete poetry)

=== Short-story collections ===
- 1870 – Contos Fluminenses
- 1873 – Histórias da meia-noite
- 1882 – Papéis avulsos (including "O alienista")
- 1884 – Histórias sem data
- 1896 – Várias histórias
- 1899 – Páginas recolhidas (including "A Missa do Galo" and "The Case of the Stick")
- 1906 – Relíquias de Casa Velha

=== Translations ===
- 1861 – Queda que as mulheres têm para os tolos, from the original De l'amour des femmes pour les sots, by Victor Hénaux
- 1865 – Suplício de uma mulher, from the original Le supplice d'une femme, by Émile de Girardin
- 1866 – Os Trabalhadores do Mar, from the original Les Travailleurs de la mer, by Victor Hugo
- 1870 – Oliver Twist, from the original Oliver Twist; or, the Parish Boy's Progress, by Charles Dickens
- 1883 – O Corvo, from The Raven, a famous poem by Edgar Allan Poe

=== Posthumous ===
- 1910 – Teatro Coligido (collected plays)
- 1910 – Crítica
- 1914 – A Semana (collection of articles)
- 1921 – Outras Relíquias (collection of short stories)
- 1921 – Páginas Escolhidas (collection of short stories)
- 1932 – Novas Relíquias (collection of short stories)
- 1937 – Crônicas (articles)
- 1937 – Crítica Literária
- 1937 – Crítica Teatral
- 1937 – Histórias Românticas
- 1939 – Páginas Esquecidas
- 1944 – Casa Velha
- 1956 – Diálogos e Reflexões de um Relojoeiro
- 1958 – Crônicas de Lélio

Collected works

There are several published "Complete Works" of Machado de Assis:

- 1920 – Obras Completas. Rio de Janeiro: Livraria Garnier (20 vols.)
- 1962 – Obras Completas. Rio de Janeiro: W.M. Jackson (31 vols.)
- 1997 – Obras Completas. Rio de Janeiro: Editora Globo (31 vols.)
- 2006 – Obras Completas. Rio de Janeiro: Nova Aguilar (3 vols.)

Works in English translation

- 1921 – Brazilian Tales. Boston: The Four Seas Company (London: Dodo Press, 2007).
- 1952 – Epitaph of a Small Winner. New York: Noonday Press (London: Hogarth Press, 1985; republished as The Posthumous Memoirs of Brás Cubas: A Novel. New York: Oxford University Press, 1997; Epitaph of a Small Winner. New York: Farrar, Straus & Giroux, 2008; UK: Bloomsbury Publishing, 2008).
- 1953 – Dom Casmurro: A Novel. New York: Noonday Press (Berkeley: University of California Press, 1966; republished as Dom Casmurro. Lord Taciturn. London: Peter Owen, 1992; Dom Casmurro: A Novel. New York: Oxford University Press, 1997).
- 1954 – Philosopher or Dog? New York: Avon Books (republished as The Heritage of Quincas Borba. New York: W.H. Allen, 1957; New York: Farrar, Straus and Giroux, 1992; republished as Quincas Borba: A Novel. New York: Oxford University Press, 1998).
- 1963 – The Psychiatrist, and Other Stories. Berkeley: University of California Press.
- 1965 – Esau and Jacob. Berkeley: University of California Press.
- 1970 – The Hand & the Glove. Lexington: University Press of Kentucky.
- 1972 – Counselor Ayres' Memorial. Berkeley: University of California Press (republished as The Wager: Aires' Journal. London: Peter Owen, 1990; also republished as The Wager, 2005).
- 1976 – Yayá Garcia: A Novel. London: Peter Owen (republished as Iaiá Garcia. Lexington: University Press of Kentucky, 1977).
- 1977 – The Devil's Church and Other Stories. Austin: University of Texas Press (New York: HarperCollins Publishers Ltd, 1987).
- 1984 – Helena: A Novel. Berkeley: University of California Press.
- 2008 – A Chapter of Hats and Other Stories. London: Bloomsbury Publishing.
- 2012 – The Alienist. New York: Melville House Publishing.
- 2013 – Resurrection. Pennsylvania: Latin American Literary Review Press (republished, annotated Dallas/Dublin: Dalkey Archive Press, 2021)
- 2013 – The Alienist and Other Stories of Nineteenth-century Brazil. Indianapolis: Hackett Publishing.
- 2014 – Ex Cathedra: Stories by Machado de Assis — Bilingual Edition. Hanover, Conn.: New London Librarium.
- 2016 – Miss Dollar: Stories by Machado de Assis — Bilingual Edition. Hanover, Conn.: New London Librarium.
- 2018 – Trio in A-Minor: Five Stories by Machado de Assis—Bilingual Edition. Hanover, Conn.: New London Librarium.
- 2018 – The Collected Stories of Machado de Assis. New York : Liveright & Company.
- 2018 – Good Days!: The Bons Dias! Chronicles of Machado de Assis (1888-1889) — Bilingual Edition. Hanover, Conn.: New London Librarium.

== Honours ==
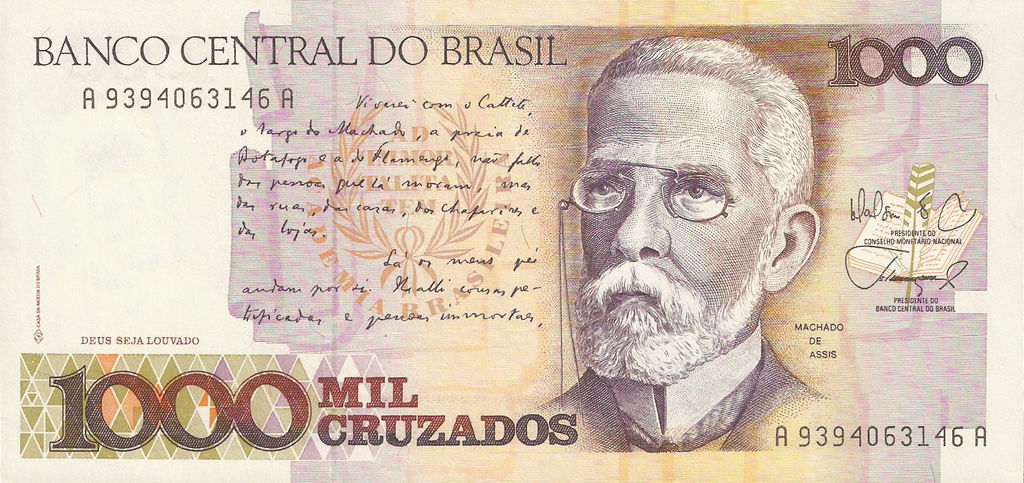
1987 banknote of 1,000 Brazilian cruzados featuring Machado de Assis

- Founding member of the Brazilian Academy of Letters (1896–1908).
- President of the Brazilian Academy of Letters (1897–1908).

=== Honours ===
- Empire of Brazil: Knight of the Order of the Rose (1867).
- Empire of Brazil: Officer of the Order of the Rose (1888).

=== Tribute ===
On 21 June 2017, Google celebrated his 178th birthday with a Google Doodle.

== Notes ==
Academic offices
| Patron: José de Alencar | 1st Academic of the 23rd chair of the Brazilian Academy of Letters; 1897–1908 | Succeeded by Lafayette Rodrigues Pereira |
| New office | President of the Brazilian Academy of Letters; 1897–1908 | Succeeded by Rui Barbosa |
