= Vera Janacópulos =

Brazilian operatic soprano (1892–1955)

Background information
- Born: 20 December 1892; Rio de Janeiro, Brazil
- Died: 5 December 1955 (aged 62) Rio de Janeiro, Brazil
- Occupations: Soprano singer, Educator
- Instrument: voice

Vera Janacópulos (20 December 1886 or 1892 – 5 December 1955) was a Brazilian soprano singer, popular in the first half of the 20th century.

== Life and career ==
Vera Janacópulos was born in Petrópolis, in a family of Greek descent. She was niece of the politician Pandiá Calógeras. After the death of her mother, Vera was taken to Paris with her sister Adriana, who became a sculptor. In Paris, Janacópulos studied violin with Romanian composer George Enescu, but stopped playing it to dedicate herself to singing.

In 1914, Janacópulos performed for the first time in a singing recital, along with Madalena Tagliaferro. The soprano has had a successful career performing in several countries in Europe (Germany, Belgium, Netherlands, France, Spain, Italy, Switzerland), North America (United States) and South America (Argentina and Brazil) and Asia (Java, Sumatra and Celebes). She performed works by Igor Stravinsky, Sergei Prokofiev (with whom she adapted his opera The Love for Three Oranges), Darius Milhaud, Manuel de Falla and Heitor Villa-Lobos, helping to disseminate the work of the Brazilian composer abroad.

Janacópulos returned to Brazil in 1940, establishing herself in São Paulo, where she presented a classical music program for Rádio Gazeta for eight years. She was also a singing teacher, where she lectured at the University of São Paulo's Escola de Arte Dramática (School of Dramatic Arts).

== Death ==
Janacópulos died in Rio de Janeiro, on 5 December 1955.

== Homages ==
A bust of the singer was sculpted by her sister Adriana, in 1958. The sculpture is located at Paris Square in Rio de Janeiro. Janacópulos' archives are collected in the Federal University of the State of Rio de Janeiro Center of Language and Arts library; an auditorium at the institution is also named after her.
