= Ressurreição =

1872 novel by Machado de Assis

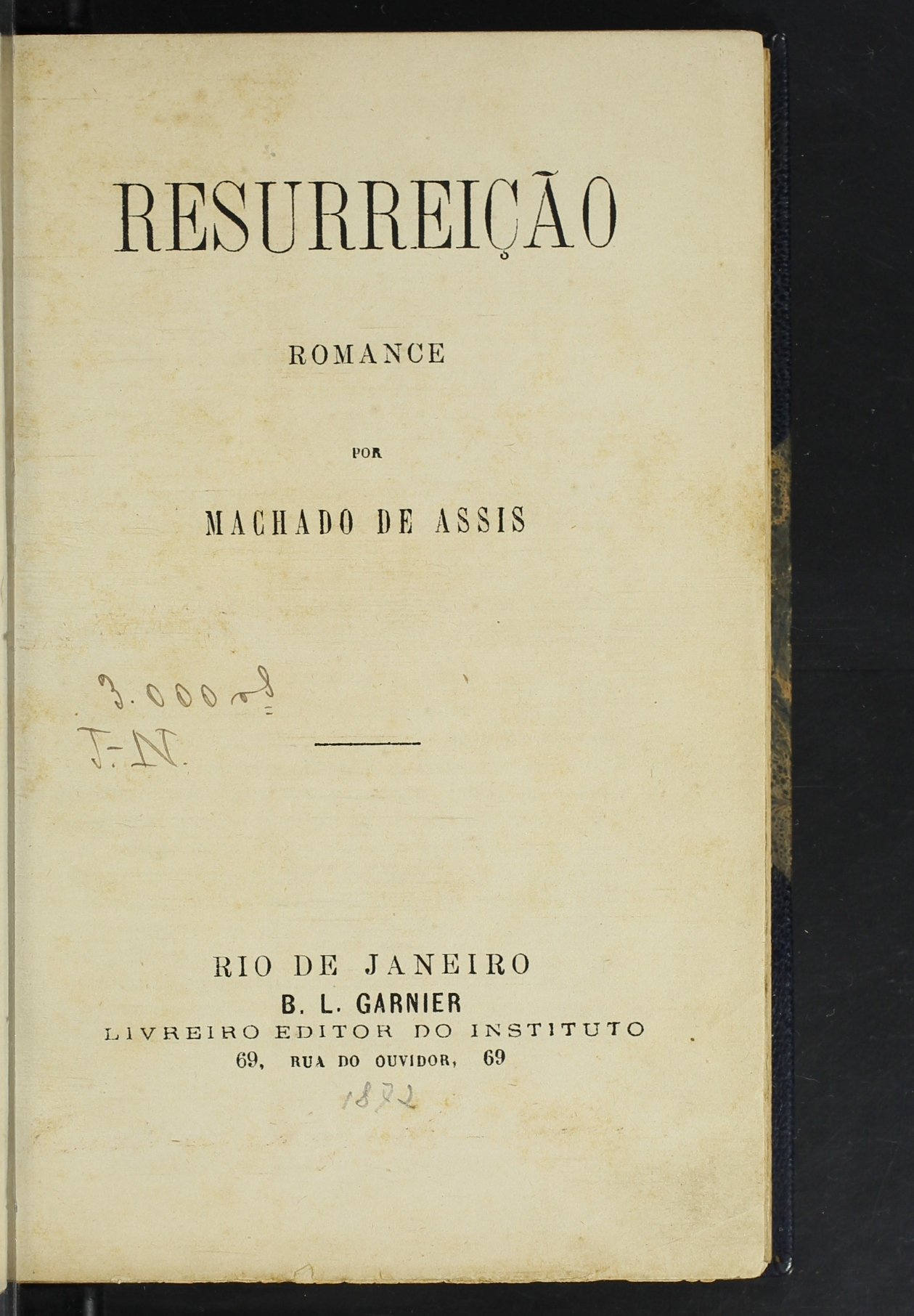
- Cover of the first edition (1875)
- Author: Machado de Assis
- Language: Portuguese
- Publication date: 1872
- Publication place: Brazil

Ressurreição (Resurrection) is Joaquim Maria Machado de Assis' first novel. It was published in 1872. Although it can be considered a romantic work, its romanticism is contained, moderate, without the sentimental excesses, the twists in the plot and the happy endings of the romantic genre. Moreover, it is also presented as a psychological novel "that although it is not unheard of, it is rare in sentimental novels" where the most important thing is not intrigue or action, "but to study the character and his behavior". It is Machado de Assis himself who makes it clear on the Notice of the first edition: "I did not want to make a novel of manners: I tried to sketch a situation and contrast two characters; with those simple elements I looked for the interest of the book". His idea was to put Shakespeare's thought into action:

Our doubts are traitors,
And make us lose the good we oft might win,
By fearing to attempt.

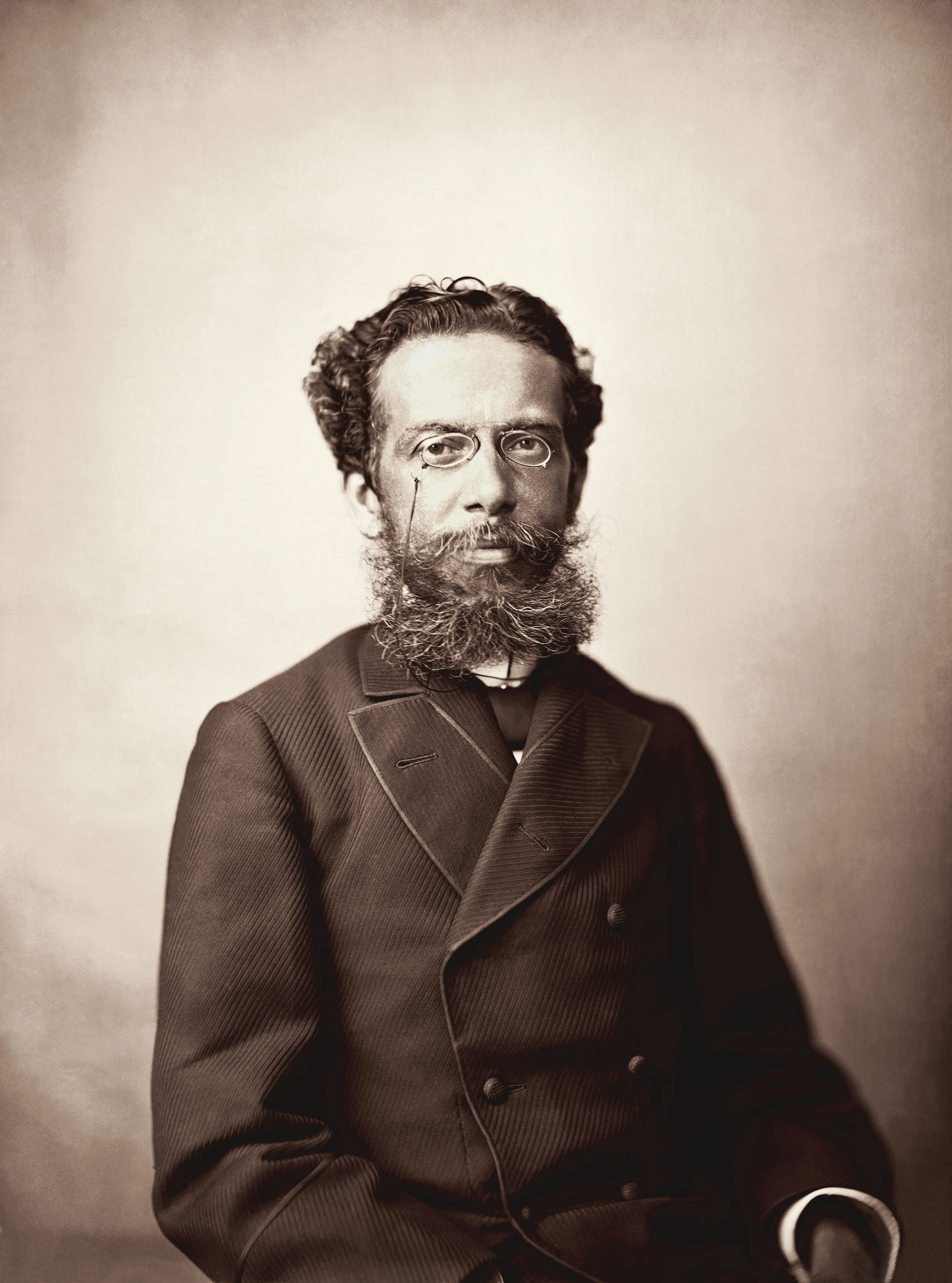
Machado de Assis, 1890

== Synopsis ==
The novel is set in Rio de Janeiro in the 19th century. Doctor Félix changes lovers every six months —"my loves are every six months; they last longer than roses, they last two seasons"— and he has just broken up with the last one, Cecilia. Viana, his friend, introduces him to his sister Livia, a beautiful woman, widowed for two years and mother of a four-year-old boy. They begin a friendly relationship but, between social gatherings and dances, end up falling in love with each other. At first they live a discreet affair, hidden from society. However, conflicts between them start arising due to his jealousy and mistrust. After many comings and goings, Felix ends up asking the widow to marry him, but he escapes on the eve of the marriage due to an anonymous letter with false accusations against Livia. Thanks to the intervention of his friend Meneses, Félix regrets his thoughtless actions and tries to reconcile with her, but now it is Livia whom no longer wants to marry the immature and unstable doctor. "Doubts will accompany you wherever we are, because doubts live eternally in your heart."—this is how Livia says goodbye to him, diagnosing the reason for her failed relationship.

Besides the main couple, Machado de Assis brings to life a myriad of secondary characters, whose personalities and physical characteristics are carefully decomposed in the novel, a distinctive trait of his works.

== Critics' response ==
In the Notice of the first edition, the author asks the critics: "What I ask of the critics is a benevolent intention, but a frank and fair expression." It seems that the critics realized the potential of Machado de Assis who became 33 in June of that year. Joaquim Serra, A Reforma, wrote that "I have not read such a well conceived and carefully finished book in a long time. Resurrection is a novel that will mark an era of our literature and will be the beginning of a triumphant career for Machado de Assis". G. Planche, from Jornal do Comércio, found its style "easy and on point with color vivacity, sober descriptions, well-constructed characters", although he pointed out that the idea of the novel was not original. The cartoon magazine O Mosquito said that the debut novelist could "serve as a model for some hollow spirits of common sense and grammar, who hear the cries of the few who still read them, with their invocations of the moon, the sun and the stars". Carlos Ferreira wrote in Correio do Brasil that "The novel is not simple narrative, it is something that first speaks to the soul, and leaves in it an impression of profound truth about the thesis that it proposes to develop, and then acclaims it in praise: Such sweet turn of phrase and what softness of thought!". Luís Guimarães Júnior, in a bibliographic section of Diário de Río de Janeiro, said: “Resurrection established the fundamental roots for this talented and modest young man, an exquisite poet and serial writer, of a rare spontaneity. [...] Doctor Félix, from Machado de Assis' novel, is a man, if not extremely possible, at least admirably understandable".
