= Giancarlo Neri =

Italian sculptor

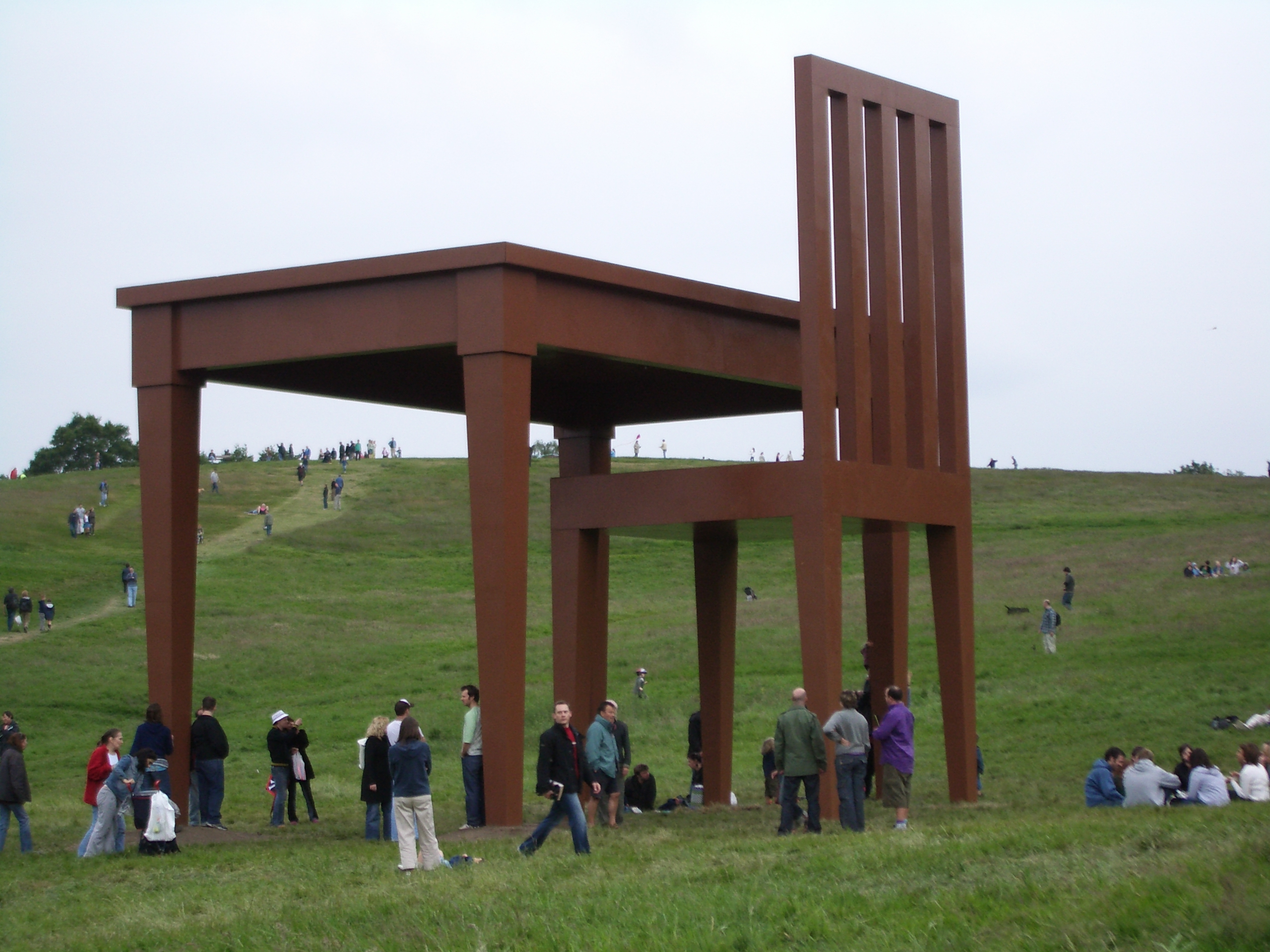
The Writer

Giancarlo Neri is a sculptor born in Naples in 1955.

== Career ==
Perhaps his best-known work is The Writer, a 9-metre-high table and chair made from steel plated with wood, a piece about writer's block. It has been exhibited in Rome and on Hampstead Heath in London in 2005. The structure was dismantled in Hampstead Heath four months later and sent back to Italy.

At one time, he played professional soccer for the New York Apollo of the American Soccer League.
