= Alfred Agache (architect) =

French architect and urbanist (1875–1959)

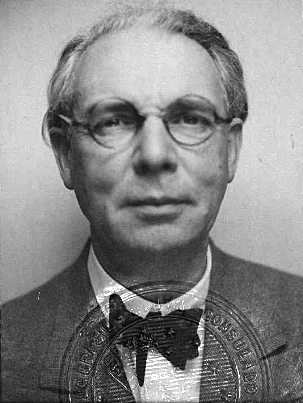
- Agache in 1939 passport photo
- Born: Hubert Donat Alfred Agache; 24 February 1875; Tours, France
- Died: 4 May 1959 (aged 84)
- Education: École des Beaux-Arts
- Occupations: Architect and urban planner

Hubert Donat Alfred Agache (24 February 1875 – 4 May 1959) was a French architect and urbanist known for his work in Brazil.

Agache was born in Tours to Auguste and Catherine Agache. He studied at the École des Beaux-Arts in Paris under Victor Laloux.

He formally planned the Brazilian cities of Rio de Janeiro, Recife, Porto Alegre and Curitiba in the 1940s and 1950s, supported by the Estado Novo regime in Brazil. And in Porto Alegre his plans for the Redenção Park were realised to host the Farroupilha Revolution centennial fair. While his plans were often too expensive to be completed, they formed the basis of more practical plans, and the affordable parts of his plan were followed for several decades, although in Curitiba the so-called Agache Plan was retired and then superseded by later urban planning efforts beginning in the 1960s.

Agache submitted designs for Canberra in the Federal Capital City design competition, and placed third.

Agache also co-founded the French Society for Urban Studies. He was made a Chevalier of the Legion of Honor in 1935 and died in 1959.

== See also ==
- Paris Square
