= Vitória Strada =

Brazilian actress

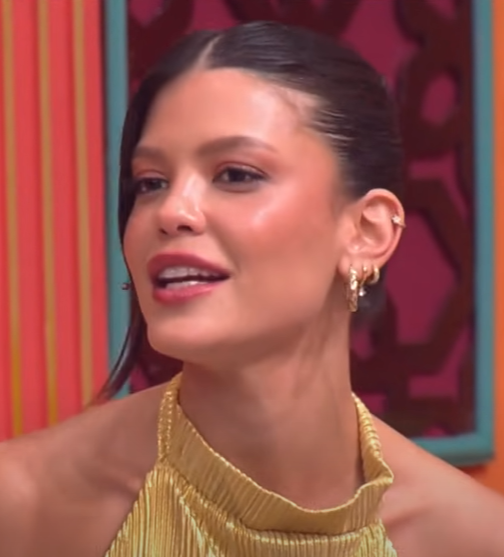
- Strada in 2025
- Born: Vitória Longaray Strada; 12 October 1996 (age 29); Porto Alegre, Rio Grande do Sul, Brazil
- Education: Federal University of Rio Grande do Sul
- Occupations: Actress; model
- Years active: 2008–present (model); 2015–present (actress)
- Height: 1.74 m (5 ft 9 in)

Vitória Longaray Strada (born 12 October 1996) is a Brazilian actress and model.

== Career ==
In 2008, Strada began her modeling career. She finished in second place in the Miss World contest in 2014. In 2015, she began studying Performing Arts at the Federal University of Rio Grande do Sul, and made her film debut in Real Beleza, where she portrayed Maria. In 2017, Strada made her first television appearance by playing Tayla on an episode of the TV series Werner E Os Mortos. Later that same year, she got the main part of the telenovela Tempo de Amar. In 2018, Strada played another main role in Espelho da Vida, portraying three characters: Julia Castelo, Cris Valência and Beatriz.

== Filmography ==
=== Television ===
| Year | Title | Character | Notes |
|---|---|---|---|
| 2017 | Werner e os Mortos | Tayla Domingues | Episode: "Match Point" |
| 2017–2018 | Tempo de Amar | Maria Vitória Correia Guedes / Maria do Céu | Protagonist |
| 2018–2019 | Espelho da Vida | Cristina "Cris" Muniz Valência / Julia Castelo / Beatriz | Protagonist |
| 2020–2021 | Salve-se Quem Puder | Kyra Romantini / Cleyde Ferreira | Protagonist |
| 2021 | Um Lugar ao Sol | Herself | Guest star |
| 2022 | Dança dos Famosos | Herself (Winner) | Season 19 |
| 2023 | Batalha do Lip Sync | Herself (2nd place) | Season 2 |
| 2024 | Fuzuê | Delegate Rebeca Carvalho | Guest star |
| 2025 | Big Brother Brasil | Herself (Housemate) | Season 25 |
| 2026 | A Boa, A Má e o Marido Gigolô | Marcelle / Rayane | Protagonist |

Film

| Year | Title | Character |
|---|---|---|
| 2015 | Real Beleza | Maria |
| 2017 | O Filme da Minha Vida | Dancer |
| 2025 | Recife Assombrado 2 | Isabel |
| 2025 | Covil | Clara |
| 2026 | Caju, Meu Amigo | Rafaela "Rafa" |

== Theater ==
| Year | Title | Character |
|---|---|---|
| 2023 | Abismo de Rosas | Lucinha |

== Awards and nominations ==
| Year | Ceremony | Category | Work nominated | Result |
|---|---|---|---|---|
| 2017 | Melhores do Ano | Revelation Actress | Tempo de Amar | Nominated |
| 2017 | Prêmio Contigo! Online | Revelation Actress | Tempo de Amar | Nominated |
| 2017 | Prêmio Extra de Televisão | Female Revelation | Tempo de Amar | Nominated |
| 2017 | Melhores do Ano Minha Novela | Revelation | Tempo de Amar | Nominated |
| 2018 | Prêmio Extra de Televisão | Best Actress | Espelho da Vida | Won |
| 2018 | Prêmio The Brazilian Critic | Best Actress In a Telenovela | Espelho da Vida | Nominated |
| 2019 | Prêmio Contigo! Online | Best Romantic Couple (with Rafael Cardoso) | Espelho da Vida | Nominated |
| 2020 | Prêmio Contigo! Online | Couple of The Year | Vitória and Marcella Rica | Won |
| 2020 | Prêmio Área VIP | Character of The Year | Salve-se Quem Puder | Nominated |
| 2020 | Melhores do Ano Minha Novela | Best Telenovela Actress | Salve-se Quem Puder | Nominated |
| 2021 | Prêmio Notícias da TV | Telenovela Actor or Actress | Salve-se Quem Puder | Nominated |
| 2021 | Prêmio Contigo! de TV | Best Telenovela Actress | Salve-se Quem Puder | Won |
| 2021 | MTV Millennial Awards | I Shipp | Vitória and Marcella Rica | Nominated |
| 2021 | Prêmio TodaTeen | LGBTQIA+ Power | Vitória Strada | Nominated |
