= Big Brother 25 =

Big Brother 25 is the twenty-fifth season of various versions of television show Big Brother and may refer to:

- Big Brother 25, the 2023 edition of the U.S. version
- Big Brother Brasil 25, the 2025 edition of the Brazilian version
