= Aline Dias =

Brazilian actress and model

- Born: September 19, 1991 (age 34); Leopoldina, Minas Gerais, Brazil
- Occupation: Actress
- Years active: 2012-present

Aline Dias Pacheco (born 19 September 1991 in Leopoldina) is a Brazilian actress and model.

== Filmography ==
=== TV ===
- Malhação (2012 - 2013)
- Sangue Bom (2013)
- Questão de Família (2014)
- Sexo e as Negas (2014)
- Malhação (2016 - 2017)
- O Tempo Não Para (2018 - 2019)
- Salve-se Quem Puder (2020 - 2021)

=== Movie ===
| Year | Title | rote |
|---|---|---|
| 2010 | Como Se Fosse o Último | Iracema |
