= Christina Rodrigues =

Brazilian actress (1963–2020)

- Born: Christina Maria Rodrigues Teixeira; 19 November 1963; Rio de Janeiro, Brazil
- Died: 17 December 2020 (aged 57); Rio de Janeiro, Brazil
- Occupation: Actress

Christina Maria Rodrigues Teixeira (19 November 1963 – 17 December 2020), known as Christina Rodrigues, was a Brazilian actress and humorist.

== Career ==
Rodrigues was known for acting on humor boards in Zorra Total (1999–2015), which later changed its name to Zorra and was extinct. She also participated in several soap operas, among them, Malhação Sonhos (2014–2015), Beleza Pura (2008), Segundo Sol (2018) and Salve-se Quem Puder (2020).

She was also a writer and playwright. Her book titled E eu aprendi a voar was published in 2020.

Rodrigues died from complications of COVID-19 in Rio de Janeiro on 17 December 2020, during the COVID-19 pandemic in Brazil at the age of 57, twenty eight days after her birthday.
