= Ana Vilela =

Brazilian singer-songwriter (born 1998)

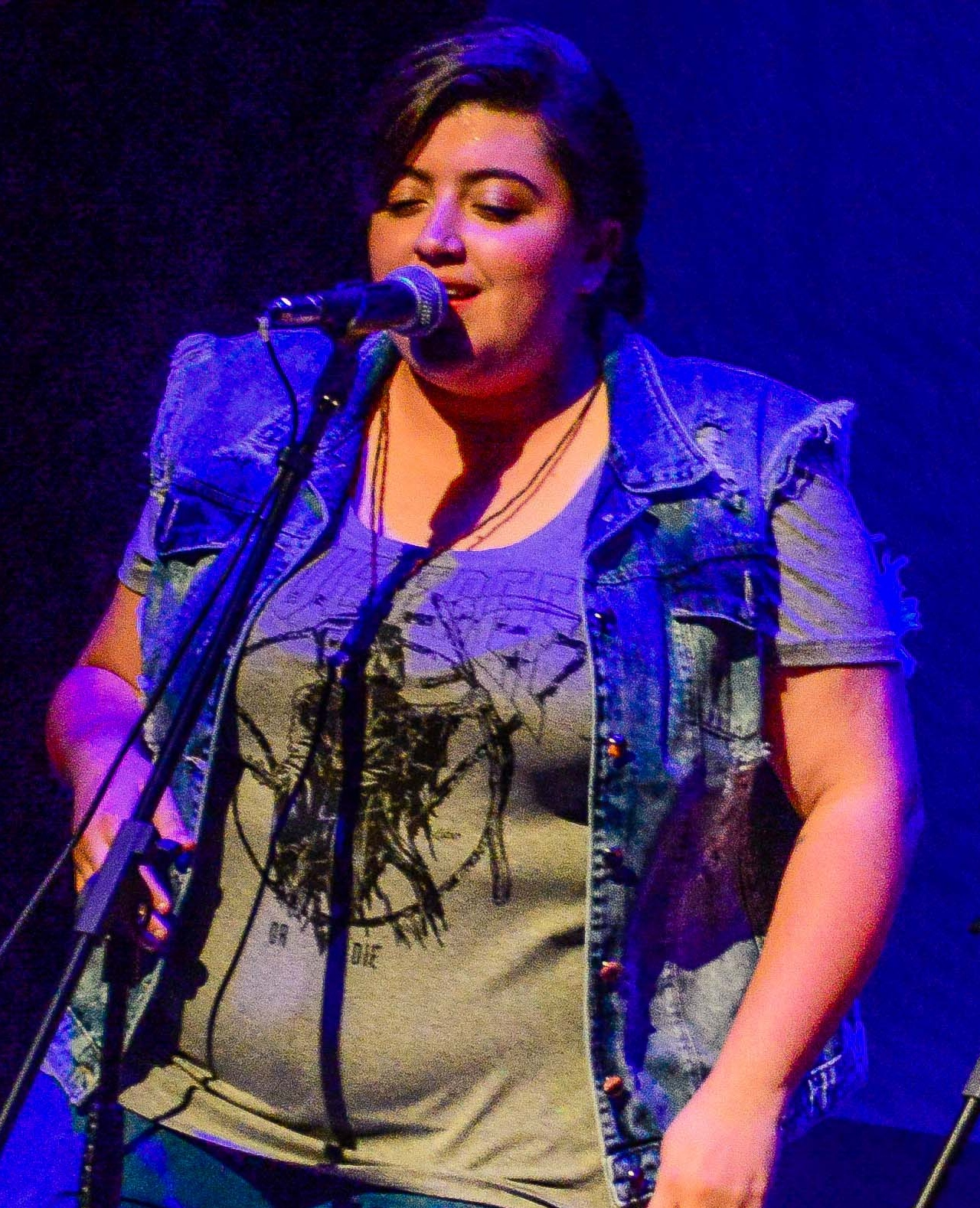
- Vilela performing at the Teatro Viradalata in São Paulo (2017)
- Born: Ana Carolina Vilela da Costa; 6 February 1998 (age 28); Londrina, Paraná, Brazil
- Occupation: Singer-songwriter
- Years active: 2016–present
- Musical career
- Genre: Música popular brasileira

Ana Carolina Vilela da Costa (born 6 February 1998) is a Brazilian singer-songwriter, best known for the song "Trem Bala".

== Biography ==
Born in Londrina, Vilela approached music as an adolescent, learning to play the guitar and composing at 12 years old. She had her breakout in 2016, when a clip of her song "Trem Bala" ('Bullet Train') went viral through YouTube and WhatsApp, collecting in a short time millions of views. The success of the song was increased when model Gisele Bündchen posted a cover of the song on Instagram. The song was eventually officially released in 2017, in an EP which included two versions of the song, one of them in a duet with Luan Santana. The same year Virela released her first self-titled album, which was eventually nominated for Best Portuguese Language Contemporary Pop Album at the 19th Annual Latin Grammy Awards.

In 2018, Vivela released an EP of cover versions of sertanejo songs, and her composition "Promete" became the theme song of the telenovela Espelho da Vida. She released her second album, Contato, in 2019. In 2023, she released the album Melhor Que Ontem. The same year, she joined the platform OnlyFans.

== Discography ==
=== Albums ===
- Ana Vilela (2017)
- Contato (2019)
- Melhor Que Ontem (2023)
