= Salve-se Quem Puder =

Brazilian telenovela

- Also known as: Run For Your Lives
- Genre: Telenovela
- Created by: Daniel Ortiz
- Written by: Flávia Bessone; Nilton Braga; Pedro Neschling; Gabriela Miranda; Bruno Segadilha; Victor Atherino
- Directed by: Marcelo Travesso; Fred Mayrink
- Starring: Deborah Secco; Juliana Paiva; Vitória Strada; João Baldasserini; Felipe Simas; Thiago Fragoso; Rafael Cardoso; José Condessa; Bruno Ferrari; Dandara Mariana; Aline Dias; Juliana Alves; Guilhermina Guinle; Flávia Alessandra; Leopoldo Pacheco
- Theme music composer: Mário Rossi; Roberto Martins
- Opening theme: "Beija-me" by Ludmilla
- Country of origin: Brazil
- Original language: Portuguese
- No. of episodes: 107 (75 International version)

Production
- Camera setup: Multi-camera
- Running time: 33–45 minutes
- Production company: Estúdios Globo

Original release
- Network: TV Globo
- Release: 27 January 2020 – 16 July 2021

Salve-se Quem Puder (English title: Run For Your Lives) is a Brazilian telenovela produced and broadcast by TV Globo. It premiered on 27 January 2020, replacing Bom Sucesso, and ended on 16 July 2021. The series is written by Daniel Ortiz, with the collaboration of Flávia Bessone, Nilton Braga, Pedro Neschling, Gabriela Miranda, Bruno Segadilha and Victor Atherino.

It stars Deborah Secco, Juliana Paiva and Vitória Strada as three women who have to enter the Witness Protection Program after witnessing a homicide. João Baldasserini, Felipe Simas, Thiago Fragoso, Rafael Cardoso, Bruno Ferrari, Dandara Mariana, Aline Dias and Juliana Alves also star in main roles.

== Plot ==
Alexia (Deborah Secco), Luna (Juliana Paiva) and Kyra (Vitória Strada) are three women who meet in Cancún and witness the murder of a powerful judge. They enter the Witness Protection Program and get sent to São Paulo, changing their names to Josimara, Fiona and Cleyde. They are presumed dead to protect them from the killers. Dominique (Guilhermina Guinle) is a dangerous woman who ordered the judge to be killed and is also the aunt of Renzo (Rafael Cardoso), who had a romance in with Alexia in Mexico. Alexia is an unsuccessful actress who had just received her first starring role in a telenovela. Alexia was always ignored by her mother (Débora Olivieri), who never hid her favoritism for her younger daughter, Petra (Bruna Guerin), an ambitious woman who wants to win over her rich and widowed cousin Alan (Thiago Fragoso). Luna and her father, Mário (Murilo Rosa), were abandoned by her mother, Helena (Flávia Alessandra), in Mexico when she was four years old. Helena crossed the border to the United States, promising to earn money and never returned. Kyra was about to marry Rafael.

Alexia, Luna and Kyra are convinced to use their new identities to infiltrate in their real lives. Alexia gets a job as Rafael's secretary in order to keep him away from his ex, Renatinha (Juliana Alves), who takes advantage of Kyra's fake death to get him back. Kyra works as a nanny for Alan so that Ignário (Otávio Augusto), Alexia's grandfather who has Alzheimer's disease, does not forget about his granddaughter. Luna infiltrates the life of her mother, who married a millionaire and is now a powerful businesswoman. Luna works as her assistant and will try to find out why she abandoned her.

== Series overview ==
Phase	Episodes	Originally released	
Phase	Episodes	First released	Last released
1	54	27 January 2020	28 March 2020
2	53	17 May 2021	16 July 2021

== Cast ==
- Deborah Secco as Alexia Máximo / Josimara dos Santos
- Juliana Paiva as Luna Furtado / Fiona Matteucchi
- Vitória Strada as Kyra Romantini / Cleyde Ferreira
- João Baldasserini as José Prazeroso "Zezinho"
- Felipe Simas as Téo Santamarina
- Thiago Fragoso as Alan Máximo
- Rafael Cardoso as Renzo Machado de Alencar
- José Condessa as Juan de La Piedra
- Bruno Ferrari as Rafael Guimarães
- Dandara Mariana as Maribel "Bel" Apolinário
- Aline Dias as Úrsula Ferraz
- Juliana Alves as Renata "Renatinha" Modesto
- Guilhermina Guinle as Dominique Machado de Alencar
- Flávia Alessandra as Helena Furtado Santamarina
- Leopoldo Pacheco as Hugo Santamarina
- Grace Gianoukas as Ermelinda "Ermê" Prazeroso
- Murilo Rosa as Mário Furtado
- Daniel Rangel as Tarantino Máximo
- Valentina Bulc as Beatriz "Bia" Romantini
- Lívia Inhudes as Thammy
- Bruna Guerin as Petra Máximo
- Débora Olivieri as Graziela Máximo
- Carolina Kasting as Agnes Romantini
- Sabrina Petraglia as Micaela Santamarina
- Marcos Pitombo as Bruno Freitas
- Cirillo Luna as Gael Freitas
- Marianna Armellini as Verônica and Marlene Andrade
- Nina Frosi as Gabriela "Gabi" Gonzáles
- Ricardo Duque as Detective Ivo Mantovani
- Otávio Augusto as Ignácio Máximo
- Cosme dos Santos as Edgard Apolinário
- Cristina Pereira as Lúcia
- Marilu Bueno as Dulce Sampaio
- Conrado Caputto as Coach Isaac
- Bernardo de Assis as Catatau / Lucy
- Giordano Becheleni as Enéas
- Cláudio Olegário as Erick
- Andressa Robles as Carol
- Bárbara Sut as Dionice
- Prazeres Barbosa as Marieta
- Gil Hernandez as Pancho
- Jerônimo Martins as Eduardo
- Daniel Satti as Donato Camargo
- Igor Cosso as Antônio Romantini Júnior
- Mila Carmo as Vicky
- Amauri Reis as Baggio
- Ygor Marçal as Nico Máximo "Mosquito"
- Alice Palmar as Sandra Máximo "Queen"

=== Guest cast ===
- Aílton Graça as Judge Vitório Albuquerque
- Jacqueline Laurence as Gracita Romantini
- Ana Carbatti as Consul Adriana Regiano
- Zezé Motta as Neusa Ferraz
- Déo Garcez as Dr. Emir
- Luka Ribeiro as Telenovela director
- Werles Pajero as Robson
- Cláudio Galvan as Taxi driver
- Maria Flor Secco Moura as Alexia / Jú
- Sophia de Carvalho as Child Luna
- Marina Loggia as Child Kyra
- Christina Rodrigues as Cidinha
- Patricia Pillar as herself
- Thiago Lacerda as himself
- Betty Faria as herself
- Ary Fontoura as himself
- Marcelo & Ryan as Themselves
- Sophia Abrahão as herself and as Júlia Santamarina
- Carol Sampaio as herself
- Mumuzinho as himself
- Nego do Borel as himself
- Narcisa Tamborindeguy as herself
- Dudu Bertholini as himself
- Ana Botafogo as herself
- Rodrigo Simas as Alejandro Garcia Morales
- Fátima Bernardes as herself
- Lília Cabral as herself
- Francisco Cuoco as himself
- Maria Eduarda de Carvalho as herself
- Marcello Melo Jr. as himself
- Bruno Dubeux as Luciano
- Patrícia Poeta as herself
- Babu Santana as Nanico

== Production ==
Daniel Ortiz began writing the synopsis for the telenovela in November 2017. The synopsis was approved in April 2018 and joined the queue of 7pm telenovelas, to premiere in early 2020. In September 2018, Daniel had already delivered 6 full episodes and revealed the first details about the story. The telenovela was originally titled Adrenalina but was later changed to Salve-se Quem Puder. Filming began in Cancún on 25 October 2019. On 16 March 2020, it was announced that filming of the telenovela was suspended due to the COVID-19 pandemic, because of this, the telenovela's broadcast will be interrupted after 28 March 2020. Reruns of previous telenovelas currently occupy its timeslot. Filming resumed on 10 August 2020, under strict criteria, to comply with safety guidelines. Scripts were rewritten so that only two actors participate in each filmed scene. The new episodes began airing on 17 May 2021.

== Soundtrack ==
Salve-se Quem Puder: Vol. 1

Soundtrack album by Various artists
- Released: 3 April 2020
- Length: 45:23
- Label: Som Livre

Salve-se Quem Puder Vol. 1 is the first soundtrack of the telenovela, released on 3 April 2020 by Som Livre.

No.	Title	Artist(s)	Length
1.	"Beija-me"	Ludmilla	2:43
2.	"Good as Hell"	Lizzo	2:38
3.	"Meu Talismã"	Iza	2:44
4.	"Devil May Dance Tonight"	Ina Forsman	4:52
5.	"Change"	The Revivalists	3:50
6.	"Caminhos"	Scarcéus	4:05
7.	"A Tal Canção Pra Lua"	Vitor Kley & Samuel Rosa	3:30
8.	"Una Flor"	Juanes	3:48
9.	"Cielito Lindo"	Luiza Possi	4:09
10.	"Meu Bem"	Cai Sahra	3:06
11.	"Você Vai Ouvir Sobre Ela"	Olívia	4:10
12.	"A Gente Faz"	Clara Valverde & Josefe	2:38
13.	"Thinking Of You"	Simply Red	3:10
Total length:			45:23

== Ratings ==
Season	Timeslot (BRT/AMT)	Episodes	First aired		Last aired		Avg. viewers (points)
Season	Timeslot (BRT/AMT)	Episodes	Date	Viewers (in points)	Date	Viewers (in points)	Avg. viewers (points)
1	Mon–Sat 7:30 p.m.	107	27 January 2020	28	16 July 2021	29	27
