= Espelho da Vida =

Brazilian telenovela

- Genre: Drama; Romance; Telenovela
- Created by: Elizabeth Jhin
- Directed by: Pedro Vasconcellos
- Starring: Vitória Strada; João Vicente de Castro; Alinne Moraes; Rafael Cardoso; Irene Ravache; Julia Lemmertz; Kéfera Buchmann; Ângelo Antônio; Felipe Camargo; Rômulo Neto; Patricya Travassos; Thati Lopes; Ana Lúcia Torre; Vera Fischer
- Opening theme: "Minha Vida” by Rita Lee
- Country of origin: Brazil
- Original language: Portuguese
- No. of episodes: 160

Production
- Production locations: Carrancas, Minas Gerais; Tiradentes, Minas Gerais; Ouro Preto, Minas Gerais; Mariana, Minas Gerais
- Camera setup: Multi-camera
- Running time: 31–45 minutes
- Production company: Estúdios Globo

Original release
- Network: TV Globo
- Release: 25 September 2018 – 1 April 2019

Espelho da Vida is a Brazilian telenovela produced and broadcast by TV Globo that premiered on 25 September 2018, replacing Orgulho e Paixão, and ended on 1 April 2019. It is created by Elizabeth Jhin, and directed by Pedro Vasconcelos.

The show features a large ensemble cast headed by; Vitória Strada, João Vicente de Castro, Alinne Moraes, Rafael Cardoso, Irene Ravache, Júlia Lemmertz, Ângelo Antônio, Vera Fischer and Kéfera Buchmann.

Set in both the present time and the 1930s, Espelho da Vida tells the story of Cris Valencia, a budding actress who accompanies her boyfriend to Rosa Branca to make a film based on Julia Castelo, a woman who was mysteriously murdered in the 30s. Cris will also discover she is actually a reincarnation of Julia Castelo. Cris will try to unravel the enigma that befell her in her past life.

== Plot ==
In the town of Rosa Branca, Vicente, on his deathbed, makes a final request to his wife, Margot: to bring back his grandson, Alain, a successful filmmaker, to create a biographical film that tells the world the story of Julia Castelo, a woman involved in a mysterious crime in the 1930s. The crime left many unanswered questions. Despite having sworn never to return to Rosa Branca after being betrayed a decade earlier by his ex-girlfriend Isabel and his cousin Felipe, Alain decides to honour his grandfather’s dying wish. Accompanied by his girlfriend, actress Cris Valencia, Alain embarks on the project, casting Cris as the film's protagonist.

During her research for the role, Cris discovers a mirror in Julia Castelo's house that allows her to travel back to the 1930s, the era when the crime occurred. There, she learns she is the reincarnation of Julia Castelo. With Margot's help, Cris delves into the past to uncover the truth behind Julia's death and determine whether Julia’s boyfriend, Danilo, was indeed the murderer or wrongly accused—a mystery obscured by the lack of documentation and evidence.

Meanwhile, Alain and Cris face challenges in the present. Isabel is determined to win back Alain, resorting to manipulation and scheming. At the same time, Cris must contend with Mariane, a fiercely ambitious actress who will stop at nothing to take the lead role in the film, even if it means sabotaging Cris.

== Cast ==
- Vitória Strada as Cristina "Cris" Muniz Valência / Julia Castelo / Beatriz
- João Vicente de Castro as Alain Dutra / Gustavo Bruno de Luris
- Alinne Moraes as Isabel Ferraz / Isadora "Dora" Monteiro
- Rafael Cardoso as Daniel Marques / Danilo Breton
- Kéfera Buchmann as Mariane Cardoso / Brigite
- Irene Ravache as Margot Dutra / Hildegard Breton
- Júlia Lemmertz as Ana Muniz de Castro / Piedade Castelo
- Ângelo Antônio as Flávio de Castro / Father Luiz
- Felipe Camargo as Américo Valência / Eugênio Castelo
- Patricya Travassos as Edméia "Grace" Ferraz / Graça Monteiro
- Emiliano Queiroz as André Luiz de Luris
- Reginaldo Faria as Vicente Dutra / Augusto Breton
- Patrick Sampaio as Felipe Dutra / Otávio de Luris
- Letícia Persiles as Dr. Letícia Oliveira / Maristela Jardim
- Robson Nunes as Afrânio "Bola" Nunes / Benjamin
- Rômulo Neto as Mauro César Pereira
- Thati Lopes as Josiane "Josi" Diniz
- Luciana Paes as Lenita Marques / Milena "Mimi" Trindade
- Nikolas Antunes as Marcelo Vendrini / Lucas
- Suzana Faini as The Old Lady / Albertina Castelo
- Ana Lúcia Torre as Gentileza "Gentil" Marques / Mother Joana
- Vera Fischer as Maria do Carmo Vilela / Gertrude Trindade
- Evandro Mesquita as Emiliano Freitas
- Luciana Vendramini as Solange Sollari
- Guilherme Hamacek as Vitor Valência
- Marcelo Laham as Tadeu Tavares
- Flávia Garrafa as Neusa Tavares
- Renata Tobelem as Daniela "Dani" Simão
- Cadu Libonati as Hugo Leitão
- Anna Rita Cerqueira as Gabriela "Gabi" Dias
- Débora Ozório as Patrícia "Pat" Vendrini Marques
- Catarina Carvalho as Michelle Aparecida Tavares
- Pedroca Monteiro as Cláudio
- Márcio Machado as Sérgio
- Maria Mônica Passos as Maria José "Zezé" Leitão / Sister Zélia
- Andrea Dantas as Abigail Leitão / Sister Dolores
- Marcelo Escorel as Dr. Dalton Teixeira / Dr. Fabrício
- Cosme dos Santos as Gerson dos Anjos
- Andrea Bacellar as Dalva / Firmina
- Dandara Albuquerque as Sheila dos Anjos
- Luciana Malcher as Débora Martins / Bendita
- Miguel Coelho as Jorge Benício
- Ana Rios as Marina Montez
- Rosana Dias as Valdete / Celine
- Wal Schneider as Martim / Hakima
- José Santa Cruz as Father Léo
- Clara Galinari as Priscila Ferraz Dutra / Teresa Monteiro
- Otávio Martins as Jadson Valência / Henrique Castelo
- Maria Luiza Galhano as Flor Maria dos Anjos

=== Guest cast ===
- Carla Diaz as Carine de Sá / Gisela "Gigi" de Castro (Note: Carine originates from A Força do Querer.)
- Marcos Junqueira as Kikito (Note: Kikito originates from A Força do Querer.)
- Haroun Abud as young André
- Ingrid Guimarães as herself
- José Loreto as himself
- Juliana Paes as herself
- Marcelo Faria as himself

== Production ==
=== Development ===
The first title to be considered for production was O Avesso da Vida. For the setting of the telenovela, the fictitious Rosa Branca, the network decided not to build a scenic city, but to record in four historic cities of Minas Gerais: Carrancas, Tiradentes, Ouro Preto and Mariana. The first phase of filming ended on 27 July 2018. The first teaser was released on 25 August 2018.

=== Casting ===
Isis Valverde was the first to be considered for the lead role, but she passed on the role due to her pregnancy. Paolla Oliveira was cast in the sequence, but the actress repeat partnership with Rafael Cardoso and Alinne Moraes in Além do Tempo, she eventually moved to Troia; Sophie Charlotte, Bianca Bin and Camila Queiroz were also considered for the role, but the part was eventually given to Vitória Strada. After starring in a number of films, Kéfera Buchmann auditioned and was cast, making her debut in television.

Alexandre Nero and Gabriel Leone were also considered for the roles of Alain and Danilo, but for already being on the air in the main roles of the series Onde Nascem os Fortes. They were replaced by João Vicente de Castro and Rafael Cardoso respectively.

== Soundtrack ==
=== Espelho da Vida: Volume 1 ===
Espelho da Vida: Volume 1

Soundtrack album by Various artists
- Released: 5 October 2018
- Length: 56:15
- Label: Som Livre

Espelho da Vida: Volume 1 was released on 5 October 2018 by Som Livre. It contains a variety of tracks by various artists.

No.	Title	Music	Length
1.	"Minha Vida"	Rita Lee	2:26
2.	"Always"	Gavin James	4:07
3.	"O Sol"	Vitor Kley	3:29
4.	"Clearly"	Grace VanderWaal	4:11
5.	"On Top Of The World"	Tim McMorris	3:36
6.	"Só Você"	Fábio Júnior	3:48
7.	"Sincero"	Lulu Santos	4:31
8.	"Coisa de Casa"	OutroEu	3:33
9.	"Espirais"	Marjorie Estiano	3:32
10.	"Mil Noite de Um Amor Sem Fim"	Silva	3:09
11.	"Certas Coisas"	Milton Nascimento	4:22
12.	"Pontos de Partida"	Max Viana	3:59
13.	"João de Barro"	Leandro Léo	4:25
14.	"O Velho e a Flor"	Toquinho and Vinicius de Moraes	4:22
15.	"Oração ao Tempo"	Maria Bethânia	2:45
Total length:			56:15

=== Espelho da Vida: Volume 2 ===
Espelho da Vida: Volume 2

Soundtrack album by Various artists
- Released: 7 December 2018
- Length: 67:10
- Label: Som Livre

Espelho da Vida: Volume 2 was released on 7 December 2018 by Som Livre.

No.	Title	Artist(s)	Length
1.	"Promete"	Ana Vilela	3:18
2.	"Outro Lugar"	Milton Nascimento	4:51
3.	"Mamãe Natureza"	Lulu Santos	4:06
4.	"O Lado Bom da Vida"	Peu Del Rey	3:23
5.	"Quando Você Passa"	Bralih	3:17
6.	"Amiúde"	Roberta Campos & Marcelo Camelo	4:47
7.	"Todo o Amor que Houver Nessa Vida"	Cazuza	2:54
8.	"Weekend"	Blitz	3:19
9.	"A Fórmula do Amor II"	Leoni & Leo Jaime	4:13
10.	"Girls Just Want to Have Fun"	BFF Girls	2:46
11.	"We Can Do Better"	Matt Simons	3:00
12.	"Save Me Now"	Andru Donalds	5:00
13.	"Today"	Eric Silver	3:32
14.	"Lovin' You"	Minnie Riperton	3:59
15.	"Ain't No Sunshine"	Bill Withers	2:04
16.	"Rosa"	Marisa Monte	2:45
17.	"Anos Dourados"	Maria Bethânia	3:15
18.	"A Time For Us"	Nino Rota, Cliff Eidelman And Royal Scottish National Orchestra	6:41
Total length:			67:10

== Ratings ==
Season	Timeslot (BRT/AMT)	Episodes	First aired		Last aired		Avg. viewers (points)
Season	Timeslot (BRT/AMT)	Episodes	Date	Viewers (points)	Date	Viewers (points)	Avg. viewers (points)
1	Monday—Saturday 6:20 pm	160	25 September 2018	21	1 April 2019	23	17.8

The premiere registered a viewership rating of 21 points, the same indices recorded by its predecessor, Orgulho e Paixão.
