= Big Brother Brasil 25 =

- Season 25
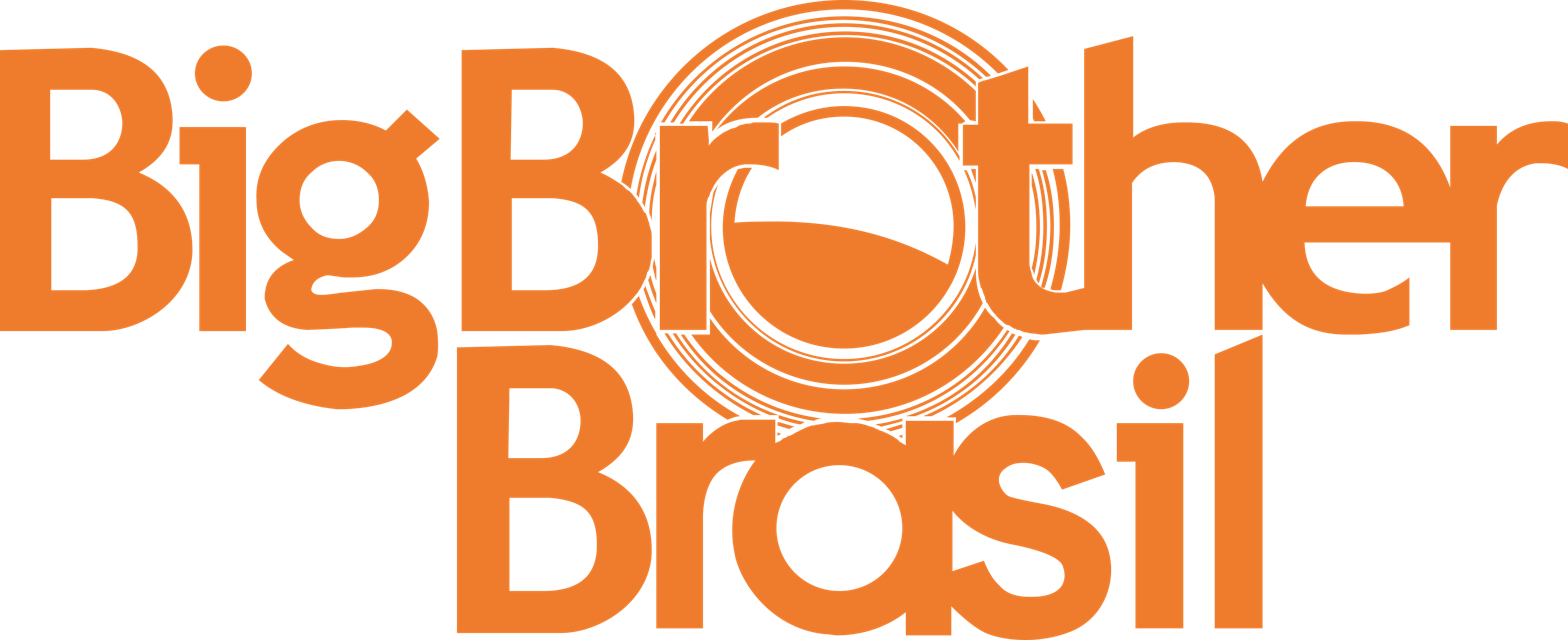
- Hosted by: Tadeu Schmidt
- No. of days: 100
- No. of housemates: 24
- Winner: Renata Saldanha
- Runner-up: Guilherme Vilar
- Companion shows: Rede BBB; Big Show
- No. of episodes: 100

Release
- Original network: TV Globo; Multishow; Globoplay
- Original release: January 13 – April 22, 2025

Season chronology
- ← Previous; Big Brother Brasil 24 Next → Big Brother Brasil 26

Big Brother Brasil 25 (Note: Also referred to as BBB 25.) was the twenty-fifth season of the Brazilian reality show Big Brother Brasil, which premiered on January 13, 2025, on TV Globo. The season continued to be hosted by journalist Tadeu Schmidt, with Rodrigo Dourado who took over as executive producer, replacing Boninho.

The season lasted for 100 days, tying with seasons 21–24 as the longest of the show. It was the sixth consecutive season that featured housemates divided into two groups: "Celebrities", composed of actors, singers, athletes and social media personalities, and "Civilians", composed of everyday Brazilians, but with a pair-based gameplay system. Only one winner was crowned.

For the first time, the grand prize was R$ 2.72 million without tax, and a Chevrolet Pickup S10 car, plus a R$150,000 prize offered to the runner-up and a R$50,000 prize offered to the housemate in third place.

Before the premiere, six new potential housemates competed for the final two spots in the main cast as part of a twist, with the winners being sequestered after the results and moving into the house on Day 1, bringing the total number of housemates up to 24.

On April 22, 2025, dancer Renata Saldanha won the competition with 51.90% of the public vote over geriatric physiotherapist Guilherme Vilar and rodeo lifeguard João Pedro Siqueira.

== Broadcast ==
The series was broadcast daily on TV Globo between January and April of 2025, in free-to-air format and on Multishow via subscription television, with live 1-hour segments after the main show's conclusion on free-to-air TV. Continuous live coverage was available through the pay-per-view (PPV) service exclusively on Globoplay for Globo.com subscribers. This was the first season to exclude traditional PPV on cable TV, ending the service after 23 years.

== The game ==
=== Pairs Twist ===
Applications for Big Brother Brasil 25 opened on April 15, 2024, during the broadcast of Big Brother Brasil 24. The spots were divided by regions of Brazil and introduced a new system of pairs, allowing applicants to join with a friend, relative, partner, or spouse.

The format followed the model introduced in Big Brother Brasil 20, combining housemates into two groups: Pipoca (civilian housemates) and Camarote (celebrity housemates).

During the first portion of the game, the pairs function as if they were a single housemate, where they would compete in competitions and could also be nominated and evicted together. However, in the second phase of the show, the housemates were split up, returning to the traditional format.

Pairs
Housemates		Relationship
Aline	Vinícius	Friends
Arleane	Marcelo	Couple
Camilla	Thamiris	Sisters
Daniele	Diego	Siblings
Diogo	Vilma	Mother/Son
Edilberto	Raissa	Father/Daughter
Eva	Renata	Friends
Gabriel	Maike	Friends
Giovanna	Gracyanne	Sisters
Guilherme	Joselma	Mother-in-Law/Son-in-Law
João Gabriel	João Pedro	Twin Brothers
Mateus	Vitória	Friends

=== Final prize change throughout the season ===
Just like the previous season, the grand prize will be undetermined until the end of the season but this time, the prize starts at R$2.500.000 and increases over the weeks through the housemates chosen by the evicted housemates, occurring on alternating weeks throughout the season.

In some weeks of the season, the housemate chosen by the previous day's evicted housemate must make a decision: choose between adding an amount to the final prize or keeping the amount for themselves. If they choose to acquire the amount, a consequence will be implemented in the house.

Week		Sum of money	Nominated	Chosen housemates	Evicted	Cash offered	Consequence	Selected housemate	Cash bonus	Remaining prize
1		R$2.500.000	Arleane; Marcelo	Giovanna; Gracyanne	Arleane; Marcelo	R$30.000	If they choose to keep the money, they will have to choose 4 pairs housemates to be chained together.	Giovanna; Gracyanne	R$30.000	R$2.530.000
1		R$2.500.000	Diogo; Vilma	Eva; Renata	Arleane; Marcelo	R$30.000	If they choose to keep the money, they will have to choose 4 pairs housemates to be chained together.	Giovanna; Gracyanne	R$30.000	R$2.530.000
1		R$2.500.000	Edilberto; Raissa	João Gabriel; João Pedro	Arleane; Marcelo	R$30.000	If they choose to keep the money, they will have to choose 4 pairs housemates to be chained together.	Giovanna; Gracyanne	R$30.000	R$2.530.000
2		R$2.530.000	Daniele; Diego	(none)	Edilberto; Raissa	(none)				R$2.530.000
2		R$2.530.000	Edilberto; Raissa	(none)	Edilberto; Raissa	(none)				R$2.530.000
2		R$2.530.000	Mateus; Vitória	(none)	Edilberto; Raissa	(none)				R$2.530.000
3		R$2.530.000	Daniele	Guilherme; Joselma	Giovanna	R$70.000	If they choose to keep the money, they will have to choose 1 room to stay locked in for an indefinite period of time.	Camilla; Thamiris	R$0	R$2.530.000
3		R$2.530.000	Diego	Guilherme; Joselma	Giovanna	R$70.000	If they choose to keep the money, they will have to choose 1 room to stay locked in for an indefinite period of time.	Camilla; Thamiris	R$0	R$2.530.000
3		R$2.530.000	Giovanna	Camilla; Thamiris	Giovanna	R$70.000	If they choose to keep the money, they will have to choose 1 room to stay locked in for an indefinite period of time.	Camilla; Thamiris	R$0	R$2.530.000
3		R$2.530.000	Gracyanne	Camilla; Thamiris	Giovanna	R$70.000	If they choose to keep the money, they will have to choose 1 room to stay locked in for an indefinite period of time.	Camilla; Thamiris	R$0	R$2.530.000
4		R$2.530.000	Aline	(none)	Gabriel	(none)				R$2.530.000
4		R$2.530.000	Gabriel	(none)	Gabriel	(none)				R$2.530.000
4		R$2.530.000	Vitória	(none)	Gabriel	(none)				R$2.530.000
5		R$2.530.000	Aline	Vinícius	Mateus	R$45.000	This is a card game, and the total amount drawn will be added to the final prize. The housemate can draw as many cards as they want, but if the sum exceeds R$45.000, they lose everything. In addition, three cards bring a consequence: choosing one housemate to stay in the Super Have-Not. Whoever goes to the Super Have-Not will receive a survival kit and eat outside the house.	Vitória	R$5.000	R$2.535.000
5		R$2.530.000	Guilherme	Joselma	Mateus	R$45.000	This is a card game, and the total amount drawn will be added to the final prize. The housemate can draw as many cards as they want, but if the sum exceeds R$45.000, they lose everything. In addition, three cards bring a consequence: choosing one housemate to stay in the Super Have-Not. Whoever goes to the Super Have-Not will receive a survival kit and eat outside the house.	Vitória	R$5.000	R$2.535.000
5		R$2.530.000	Mateus	Vitória	Mateus	R$45.000	This is a card game, and the total amount drawn will be added to the final prize. The housemate can draw as many cards as they want, but if the sum exceeds R$45.000, they lose everything. In addition, three cards bring a consequence: choosing one housemate to stay in the Super Have-Not. Whoever goes to the Super Have-Not will receive a survival kit and eat outside the house.	Vitória	R$5.000	R$2.535.000
6		R$2.535.000	Diogo	(none)	Diogo	(none)				R$2.535.000
6		R$2.535.000	Vilma	(none)	Diogo	(none)				R$2.535.000
6		R$2.535.000	Vitória	(none)	Diogo	(none)				R$2.535.000
7		R$2.535.000	Camilla	Thamiris	Camilla	R$60.000	If it choose to keep the money, it will have to choose 2 housemates to sleep outside the house.	Thamiris	R$0	R$2.535.000
7		R$2.535.000	Renata	Eva	Camilla	R$60.000	If it choose to keep the money, it will have to choose 2 housemates to sleep outside the house.	Thamiris	R$0	R$2.535.000
7		R$2.535.000	Vilma	João Pedro	Camilla	R$60.000	If it choose to keep the money, it will have to choose 2 housemates to sleep outside the house.	Thamiris	R$0	R$2.535.000
8		R$2.535.000	Aline	(none)	Thamiris	(none)				R$2.535.000
8		R$2.535.000	Thamiris	(none)	Thamiris	(none)				R$2.535.000
8		R$2.535.000	Vinícius	(none)	Thamiris	(none)				R$2.535.000
9		R$2.535.000	Daniele	Diego	Gracyanne	R$90.000	If it choose to keep the money, the all housemates will go to Have-Not, with the exception of him and 2 other housemates of his choice.	Joselma	R$0	R$2.535.000
9		R$2.535.000	Eva	Renata	Gracyanne	R$90.000	If it choose to keep the money, the all housemates will go to Have-Not, with the exception of him and 2 other housemates of his choice.	Joselma	R$0	R$2.535.000
9		R$2.535.000	Gracyanne	Joselma	Gracyanne	R$90.000	If it choose to keep the money, the all housemates will go to Have-Not, with the exception of him and 2 other housemates of his choice.	Joselma	R$0	R$2.535.000
10		R$2.535.000	Aline	(none)	Aline	(none)				R$2.535.000
10		R$2.535.000	Diego	(none)	Aline	(none)				R$2.535.000
10		R$2.535.000	Maike	(none)	Aline	(none)				R$2.535.000
11	Day 77	R$2.535.000	Eva	(none)	Eva	(none)				R$2.535.000
11	Day 77	R$2.535.000	Joselma	(none)	Eva	(none)				R$2.535.000
11	Day 77	R$2.535.000	Vinícius	(none)	Eva	(none)				R$2.535.000
11	Day 79	R$2.535.000	Diego	Daniele	Vilma	R$90.000	This is a card game, and the total amount drawn will be added to the final prize. The housemate can draw as many cards as they want, and accumulates the amount drawn, which can reach R$90.000 in total. There will also be two 'bomb' cards. If one of these cards appears, the game ends and the housemate wins nothing, accumulating R$100.000 for the final prize. In addition, three cards bring a consequence: choosing 2 housemates to be chained by their feet for an indefinite period of time — in fact, the housemate may suffer this consequence.	Maike	R$100.000	R$2.635.000
11	Day 79	R$2.535.000	Vilma	Maike	Vilma	R$90.000		Maike	R$100.000	R$2.635.000
11	Day 79	R$2.535.000	Vinícius	Joselma	Vilma	R$90.000		Maike	R$100.000	R$2.635.000
12	Day 84	R$2.635.000	Daniele	(none)	Daniele	(none)				R$2.635.000
12	Day 84	R$2.635.000	João Pedro	(none)	Daniele	(none)				R$2.635.000
12	Day 84	R$2.635.000	Maike	(none)	Daniele	(none)				R$2.635.000
12	Day 86	R$2.635.000	Diego	(none)	João Gabriel	(none)				R$2.635.000
12	Day 86	R$2.635.000	João Gabriel	(none)	João Gabriel	(none)				R$2.635.000
12	Day 86	R$2.635.000	Vitória	(none)	João Gabriel	(none)				R$2.635.000
13	Day 88	R$2.635.000	Maike	(none)	Maike	(none)				R$2.635.000
13	Day 88	R$2.635.000	Renata	(none)	Maike	(none)				R$2.635.000
13	Day 88	R$2.635.000	Vinícius	(none)	Maike	(none)				R$2.635.000
13	Day 91	R$2.635.000	Renata	(none)	Vinícius	(none)				R$2.635.000
13	Day 91	R$2.635.000	Vinícius	(none)	Vinícius	(none)				R$2.635.000
13	Day 91	R$2.635.000	Vitória	(none)	Vinícius	(none)				R$2.635.000
13	Day 93	R$2.635.000	Guilherme	Diego; Guilherme; João Pedro; Renata; Vitória	Joselma	R$105.000	This is a card game, in which all housemates participate and the total amount drawn will be added to the final prize. The housemates can draw as one of eight cards as they want, and each housemates was only allowed one play. The cards contain sums of money that could be given to housemate choose to keep the money or accumulates the amount drawn for the final prize, which can reach R$105.000 in total.	Diego; Guilherme; João Pedro; Renata; Vitória	R$85.000	R$2.720.000
13	Day 93	R$2.635.000	Joselma	Diego; Guilherme; João Pedro; Renata; Vitória	Joselma	R$105.000	This is a card game, in which all housemates participate and the total amount drawn will be added to the final prize. The housemates can draw as one of eight cards as they want, and each housemates was only allowed one play. The cards contain sums of money that could be given to housemate choose to keep the money or accumulates the amount drawn for the final prize, which can reach R$105.000 in total.	Diego; Guilherme; João Pedro; Renata; Vitória	R$85.000	R$2.720.000
13	Day 93	R$2.635.000	Renata	Diego; Guilherme; João Pedro; Renata; Vitória	Joselma	R$105.000	This is a card game, in which all housemates participate and the total amount drawn will be added to the final prize. The housemates can draw as one of eight cards as they want, and each housemates was only allowed one play. The cards contain sums of money that could be given to housemate choose to keep the money or accumulates the amount drawn for the final prize, which can reach R$105.000 in total.	Diego; Guilherme; João Pedro; Renata; Vitória	R$85.000	R$2.720.000
14	Day 95	R$2.720.000	Diego	(none)	Diego	(none)				R$2.720.000
14	Day 95	R$2.720.000	Renata	(none)	Diego	(none)				R$2.720.000
14	Day 95	R$2.720.000	Vitória	(none)	Diego	(none)				R$2.720.000
14	Day 98	R$2.720.000	João Pedro	(none)	Vitória	(none)				R$2.720.000
14	Day 98	R$2.720.000	Renata	(none)	Vitória	(none)				R$2.720.000
14	Day 98	R$2.720.000	Vitória	(none)	Vitória	(none)				R$2.720.000
Finale		Jackpot								R$2.720.000

=== The house ===
The 25th season's theme will celebrate 60 years of TV Globo, with rooms referencing the network's flagship productions.

=== Voting system ===
The voting system remains unchanged from the previous season. In addition to having unlimited votes online ("Fan Vote"), the viewers would have the option to vote only once on a separate platform, using their CPF, where they would only be allowed to cast one vote per round. Each of these systems would have a weighted average of 50% in the final result of the vote.

=== Expanded HoH privileges ===
Along with the typical duties of the Head of Household, the HoH will allow in "Control Center" extra Monster Punishment taps to be triggered, albeit in a limited way.

Another new feature compared to the previous season is the replacement of the "HoH's Room" with the "HoH's Apartment", where the winner of Thursday's competition goes up to an exclusive room, with its own kitchen, as well as a bed and bathroom. In addition, the HoH of the week won an apartment from MRV, valued at R$260,000 in cash.

Through the "HoH Pursuer" function, he will be able to find out who was the housemate who most tried to put him on the eviction. Finally, every week, the public will choose an emoji in the "HoH Poll" to define leadership performance: Spicy, Sleepy, Brainstorming, I'm Watching, Radioactive or Flying.

Before the "HoH's Party", the HoH must choose a housemate who will be banned from the party and will be locked in the "Barred from the Ball Room". In this room, the barred housemate will only have access to bread, water, and a bathroom and must complete a challenge, which, if completed, will grant access to the party; otherwise, he or she will only be able to return home after the end of the party.

=== Big Sincere ===
Since season twenty-four, the "Big Sincere" is shown live every Monday, the dynamic will be carried out only by the protagonists of the week: the HoH, the PoI holder and those nominated for eviction.

The host will ask questions based on the themes drawn by the housemates during the panel. The other housemates remain inside the house and watch on the living room screen. If the named participant is among the protagonists of the week, there is the right to reply.

The new feature this season was the inclusion of the "Popcorn Meter", which is a jury composed of former housemates, where they evaluate the arguments of the housemates inside the house, but with the current confined being isolated in another corner, without having contact with them, just as the chosen ones of the dynamic also have no contact with the former housemates, being in the external area. The judges define whether the housemate "well done" (positive answer) or "popped" (negative answer). If he does well in the dynamic, the housemate applies a consequence to the opponent, now, if he does badly, the housemate himself receives the consequence.

=== New pair ===
On Friday, January 10, 2025, during the Mais Você show, three pairs potential housemates were revealed, who had ten minutes to have breakfast and talk with Ana Maria Braga. Viewers were asked to vote one pair into the game. As a result, 24 housemates would participate in the season.

=== Terror Lunch ===
The special lunch was a twist that mixed privilege and consequence in the game. On January 29, 2025, Eva answered the Big Phone and, together with her partner Renata, secured a special lunch with a menu prepared by Ana Maria Braga. They were able to choose two more pairs to accompany them: Gabriel & Maike and Guilherme & Joselma.

The lunch was broadcast live to the rest of the house, and, at the end, the housemates who enjoyed the moment had to make some decisions as part of the twist. They chose two housemates (Mateus and Daniele) to switch rooms, one housemate (Gracyanne) to stay out of the Wednesday Show, and two housemates of different pairs (Diego and Thamiris) to be tied up for an indefinite period of time. At the end of the lunch, the three pairs had to decide which one of them would receive immunity of this week.

=== Secret Room ===
In the third week, the public voted to evict individuals as opposed to duos. The nominee with the most votes was evicted from the game. However, their duo was also fake evicted, and temporarily sent to the Secret Room. It later returned to the game with immunity.

On February 4, 2025, Giovanna was evicted, but she left the house twice, with her pair partner, Gracyanne, who ended up being sent to the Secret Room. During her stay, the housemate had access to live images and audio from the house, as well as a special session in which she was able to watch the votes she received in the last nomination and the comments of the other housemates about her eviction in the Diary Room diaries. On the morning of February 6, 2025, Gracyanne returned to the house with immunity and was integrated into the Have group.

=== Freeze ===
At various points in the season, when an alarm would ring, the housemates were required to stay frozen, as a contestant's loved one entered the house. The housemates are unable to move until instructed by Big Brother to do so. If they move beforehand, they would receive a punishment.

On Day 25, the twist took place in the context of Gracyanne's re-entered the house from the Secret Room. If any housemate moved, everyone would face a consequence: the house would be sent to the Have-Not. Camilla, João Pedro and Mateus were unable to comply with the rule and, therefore, all housemates were penalized, except Gracyanne.

=== Challenge Room ===
On Day 45, a button was placed in the middle of the garden. Whoever pressed the button had the power to prevent one housemate from competing in the upcoming HoH competition. Additionally, they were automatically sent to the challenge room. In the room, the selected housemate had to compete in a challenge.

If they completed it, they would become a Have, receive immunity, and prevent a second housemate from competing in the next HoH competition; however, if they unsuccessfully completed the challenge, they would be a Have-Not, be automatically nominated, and not be eligible to be HoH that week.

Vinícius decided to press the button, which resulted in Maike being vetoed from the HoH competition. He then went to the Challenge Room, where he managed to complete the challenge in time. As a result, he won immunity, become a Have and had the right to prevent someone else, and he chose to prevent Vilma from the HoH competition.

=== Mr. Fifi ===
The season now features a robot called Mr. Fifi. He listens to the housemates' conversations and then the three parts captured by him are recorded and put to a vote, where the public decides which conversation will be shown to the housemates in the house.

On February 28, a popular vote was opened, valid until the premiere, for the public to choose a housemate for "RoBBB Mr. Fifi" to tell a gossip about him that happened on the reality show. The six housemates with the most votes will hear what was said about them at some point this season.

Those most voted by the public to receive gossip from Mr. Fifi in the game were Vitória (35.04%), Diego (16.62%), Renata (16.02%), Eva (8.15%), Aline (6.36%) and Guilherme (5.45%).

On the afternoon of Monday, March 3, 2025, the chosen housemates received two pieces of gossip from Mr. Fifi in the house, without the authors being announced. Later, during "Big Sincere", the chosen housemates had to try to guess who was responsible for the gossip, and then watched the video of the moment that occurred. If the housemate guessed who was responsible for the gossip, he would win a new gossip from Mr. Fifi, but this time without showing a video.

=== Glass House ===
On March 11, a public vote was opened among all housemates for a new twist. In "Mr. Fifi's Showcase", a new twist of Glass House, the housemate with the most votes from the public would have the privilege of receiving information about the game for a period of time.

On Thursday morning, the housemate will enter the environment protected by a display window (in the style of a Glass House), at Via Parque Shopping, in Barra da Tijuca, Rio de Janeiro, to interact with visitors and have access to some external information. And those who are not present can send various information through the program's open social network with the public. In addition, the chosen housemate will return to the house with immunity.

Renata was the most voted with 27.28% of the public vote and went to the Glass House on Day 60, where they were able to interact with the public and receive information from the outside world, returning to the house with immunity in the morning of the next day, and also was automatically became a Have, after the draw at the Glass House.

=== The HoH's Crosshairs ===
After HoH's competition, the winner of the competition will name a shortlist of potential nominees referred to "The HoH's Crosshairs". The HoH will hand out a number of wristbands to housemates in the house, marking them as potential nominees, with one being nominated.

Week		HoH(s)	Chosen housemates	Nominated
1		Aline & Vinícius	Arleane & Marcelo; Diogo & Vilma; ~~João Gabriel &~~; ~~João Pedro~~	Arleane & Marcelo
2		Diogo & Vilma	~~Aline &~~; ~~Vinícius~~; ~~Camilla &~~; ~~Thamiris~~; Mateus & Vitória	Mateus & Vitória
3		Gabriel & Maike	Aline & Vinícius; Daniele & Diego; Mateus & Vitória	Daniele & Diego
4		João Gabriel	Aline; Camilla; ~~Mateus~~; Thamiris; Vitória	Aline
5		Eva	Camilla; Gracyanne; Mateus; Thamiris; Vitória	Mateus
6		João Pedro	Aline; Camilla; Daniele; Diego; Vitória	Vitória
7		Vitória	Eva; João Gabriel; João Pedro; Renata; Vilma	Renata
8		Maike	Aline; Daniele; Diego; Vinícius; Vitória	Vinícius
9		Guilherme	Eva; Gracyanne; João Gabriel; ~~João Pedro~~; Maike; ~~Renata~~	Gracyanne
10		Renata	Aline; Daniele; Diego; Joselma; Vinícius; Vitória	Aline
11	Day 74	Maike	Daniele; Diego; Joselma	Joselma
12	Day 81	Vitória	~~João Gabriel~~; João Pedro; Renata	João Pedro

=== Joker Power ===
Each week, before the house groceries purchases, an advantage or twist of some kind will be offered to all housemates, who can then bid for it in the Diary Room using their in-game currencies, if they wish so. The results will then be displayed to the whole House, with the housemate who entered the Diary Room and bid for the advantage first being the winner, in the event of a tie. The housemates are allowed to share, omit or lie regarding any details related to the bid.

Since season twenty-four, through the "Lose and Win" twist, the housemates will enter the Diary Room with the amount of bids they have accumulated, but the value will change unpredictably. Initially, there will be a quick game of luck, the result of which may be the addition or loss of stakes. After that, knowing the new balance, they can decide if they want to participate in the auction.

Week	Power	Bidders				Winner	Description
Week	Power	Housemate	Remaining amount	Lose and Win	Final bids	Winner	Description
6	Exchange Power	Camilla	480	1500	1980	Camilla	During Sunday's nominations, the winner of this power would be able to exchange one of the two nominees by the Big Phone for another housemate.
6	Exchange Power	Diego	470	1500	1670	Camilla	During Sunday's nominations, the winner of this power would be able to exchange one of the two nominees by the Big Phone for another housemate.
6	Exchange Power	Guilherme	890	500	1390	Camilla	During Sunday's nominations, the winner of this power would be able to exchange one of the two nominees by the Big Phone for another housemate.
6	Exchange Power	Maike	1170	50	900	Camilla	During Sunday's nominations, the winner of this power would be able to exchange one of the two nominees by the Big Phone for another housemate.
6	Exchange Power	João Gabriel	1390	500	500	Camilla	During Sunday's nominations, the winner of this power would be able to exchange one of the two nominees by the Big Phone for another housemate.
6	Exchange Power	Renata	1660	500	500	Camilla	During Sunday's nominations, the winner of this power would be able to exchange one of the two nominees by the Big Phone for another housemate.
6	Exchange Power	Thamiris	650	1000	500	Camilla	During Sunday's nominations, the winner of this power would be able to exchange one of the two nominees by the Big Phone for another housemate.
6	Exchange Power	Vilma	920	100	500	Camilla	During Sunday's nominations, the winner of this power would be able to exchange one of the two nominees by the Big Phone for another housemate.
6	Exchange Power	Vinícius	1300	100	500	Camilla	During Sunday's nominations, the winner of this power would be able to exchange one of the two nominees by the Big Phone for another housemate.
6	Exchange Power	João Pedro	1510	1000	300	Camilla	During Sunday's nominations, the winner of this power would be able to exchange one of the two nominees by the Big Phone for another housemate.
6	Exchange Power	Eva	780	300	280	Camilla	During Sunday's nominations, the winner of this power would be able to exchange one of the two nominees by the Big Phone for another housemate.
6	Exchange Power	Vitória	460	300	160	Camilla	During Sunday's nominations, the winner of this power would be able to exchange one of the two nominees by the Big Phone for another housemate.
6	Exchange Power	Diogo	560	300	100	Camilla	During Sunday's nominations, the winner of this power would be able to exchange one of the two nominees by the Big Phone for another housemate.
6	Exchange Power	Joselma	1630	300	100	Camilla	During Sunday's nominations, the winner of this power would be able to exchange one of the two nominees by the Big Phone for another housemate.
7	Pirate Power	Diego	1590	1500	2590	Diego	During Sunday's nominations, the winner of this power would be able to steal someone’s nomination vote - not allowing one housemate to vote and allowing the holder to vote twice.
7	Pirate Power	Vinícius	870	1500	2270	Diego	During Sunday's nominations, the winner of this power would be able to steal someone’s nomination vote - not allowing one housemate to vote and allowing the holder to vote twice.
7	Pirate Power	Camilla	460	1500	1960	Diego	During Sunday's nominations, the winner of this power would be able to steal someone’s nomination vote - not allowing one housemate to vote and allowing the holder to vote twice.
7	Pirate Power	João Gabriel	1350	300	1650	Diego	During Sunday's nominations, the winner of this power would be able to steal someone’s nomination vote - not allowing one housemate to vote and allowing the holder to vote twice.
7	Pirate Power	Renata	1660	300	1501	Diego	During Sunday's nominations, the winner of this power would be able to steal someone’s nomination vote - not allowing one housemate to vote and allowing the holder to vote twice.
7	Pirate Power	Maike	880	50	500	Diego	During Sunday's nominations, the winner of this power would be able to steal someone’s nomination vote - not allowing one housemate to vote and allowing the holder to vote twice.
7	Pirate Power	Thamiris	1380	500	500	Diego	During Sunday's nominations, the winner of this power would be able to steal someone’s nomination vote - not allowing one housemate to vote and allowing the holder to vote twice.
7	Pirate Power	Joselma	1030	50	100	Diego	During Sunday's nominations, the winner of this power would be able to steal someone’s nomination vote - not allowing one housemate to vote and allowing the holder to vote twice.
7	Pirate Power	Vilma	520	10	100	Diego	During Sunday's nominations, the winner of this power would be able to steal someone’s nomination vote - not allowing one housemate to vote and allowing the holder to vote twice.
8	Double Vote	Daniele	40	2000	1800	Daniele	During Sunday's nominations, the vote of the winner of this power would be counted as two.
9	Power of No in the Veto Competition	Vinícius	1610	1000	2610	Vinícius	The winner of this power would be able to veto one of the three housemates nominated from competing in the Veto Competition, sending them directly for eviction.
9	Power of No in the Veto Competition	Guilherme	1150	1000	2150	Vinícius	The winner of this power would be able to veto one of the three housemates nominated from competing in the Veto Competition, sending them directly for eviction.
9	Power of No in the Veto Competition	Renata	1490	200	1690	Vinícius	The winner of this power would be able to veto one of the three housemates nominated from competing in the Veto Competition, sending them directly for eviction.
9	Power of No in the Veto Competition	Aline	950	400	1350	Vinícius	The winner of this power would be able to veto one of the three housemates nominated from competing in the Veto Competition, sending them directly for eviction.
9	Power of No in the Veto Competition	Eva	560	1000	1160	Vinícius	The winner of this power would be able to veto one of the three housemates nominated from competing in the Veto Competition, sending them directly for eviction.
9	Power of No in the Veto Competition	Vitória	540	200	700	Vinícius	The winner of this power would be able to veto one of the three housemates nominated from competing in the Veto Competition, sending them directly for eviction.
9	Power of No in the Veto Competition	Daniele	1280	400	600	Vinícius	The winner of this power would be able to veto one of the three housemates nominated from competing in the Veto Competition, sending them directly for eviction.
9	Power of No in the Veto Competition	Joselma	1120	1000	500	Vinícius	The winner of this power would be able to veto one of the three housemates nominated from competing in the Veto Competition, sending them directly for eviction.
9	Power of No in the Veto Competition	Vilma	510	500	10	Vinícius	The winner of this power would be able to veto one of the three housemates nominated from competing in the Veto Competition, sending them directly for eviction.
9	Power of No in the Veto Competition	João Pedro	790	500	1	Vinícius	The winner of this power would be able to veto one of the three housemates nominated from competing in the Veto Competition, sending them directly for eviction.
10	Power of Veto at a Big Phone Nomination	Joselma	2460	2000	4460	Joselma	The winner of this power would be able to save one of the two housemates nominated through the Big Phone. In addition, the nominee saved by this power would also received immunity for the eviction.
10	Power of Veto at a Big Phone Nomination	Guilherme	2550	500	3050	Joselma	The winner of this power would be able to save one of the two housemates nominated through the Big Phone. In addition, the nominee saved by this power would also received immunity for the eviction.
10	Power of Veto at a Big Phone Nomination	Eva	1810	10	1800	Joselma	The winner of this power would be able to save one of the two housemates nominated through the Big Phone. In addition, the nominee saved by this power would also received immunity for the eviction.
10	Power of Veto at a Big Phone Nomination	Renata	2090	500	1590	Joselma	The winner of this power would be able to save one of the two housemates nominated through the Big Phone. In addition, the nominee saved by this power would also received immunity for the eviction.
10	Power of Veto at a Big Phone Nomination	João Gabriel	720	500	1220	Joselma	The winner of this power would be able to save one of the two housemates nominated through the Big Phone. In addition, the nominee saved by this power would also received immunity for the eviction.
10	Power of Veto at a Big Phone Nomination	João Pedro	660	500	1000	Joselma	The winner of this power would be able to save one of the two housemates nominated through the Big Phone. In addition, the nominee saved by this power would also received immunity for the eviction.
10	Power of Veto at a Big Phone Nomination	Vinícius	1260	500	760	Joselma	The winner of this power would be able to save one of the two housemates nominated through the Big Phone. In addition, the nominee saved by this power would also received immunity for the eviction.

=== Power of No ===
The "Power of No" is a dynamic tied to the Head of Household, allowing them to veto a housemate from competing in the next Head of Household challenge.

Week		Previous HoH(s)	Total	Vetoed housemate(s)
2		Aline & Vinícius	1	Edilberto & Raissa
5		Camilla	1	Diogo
5		Diogo	1	Gracyanne
6		Eva	1	Camilla
7		Vinícius	2	Maike, Vilma
8		Elimination Chain	3	Diego, João Pedro, Thamiris
9		Glass House	1	Renata
10		Guilherme	1	João Gabriel
11	Day 77	Maike	2	Diego, Vinícius
12	Day 81	Maike	1	Vinícius
12	Day 84	Vitória	1	João Pedro

=== Big Phone ===
Once in a while, the Big Phone rings, unleashing good or bad consequences on the nomination process for those who decide to answer it.

Week	Housemate	Date	Time (BRT)	Consequences
2	Gabriel & Maike	January 25, 2025	Saturday; 10:56 p.m.	See note 7
2	Camilla & Thamiris	January 26, 2025	Sunday; 11:20 p.m.	See note 7
3	Eva & Renata	January 29, 2025	Wednesday; 11:52 a.m.	See note 10
6	Diogo	February 22, 2025	Saturday; 11:05 p.m.	See note 19
8	Daniele	March 9, 2025	Sunday; 11:20 a.m.	See note 26
10	Vinícius	March 23, 2025	Saturday; 11:05 p.m.	See note 31

=== The Counterattack ===
The counterattack is a surprise power given to either the HoH's nominee and/or the House's nominee, in which they have the opportunity to automatically nominate an additional housemate for eviction. While viewers are informed when the power will be featured in advance (on Thursdays before the Head of Household competition even takes place), the housemates are only informed about the twist on the spot, during Sunday's live nominations.

Week		Housemate	Status	Used on:	Result
1		Diogo & Vilma	House's nominees	Mateus & Vitória	See note 5
2		Edilberto & Raissa	Big Phone's nominees	Guilherme & Joselma	See note 9
3		Diogo & Vilma, Giovanna & Gracyanne	House's nominees	Aline & Vinícius	See note 12
8		Thamiris	House's nominee	Aline	See note 25
8		Aline	Counterattack's nominee	Gracyanne	See note 25
9		Gracyanne	HoH's nominee	João Gabriel	See note 29
11	Day 77	Vilma	House's nominee	Vinícius	See note 34
13	Day 86	Maike	HoH's nominee	Vinícius	See note 36

== Housemates ==
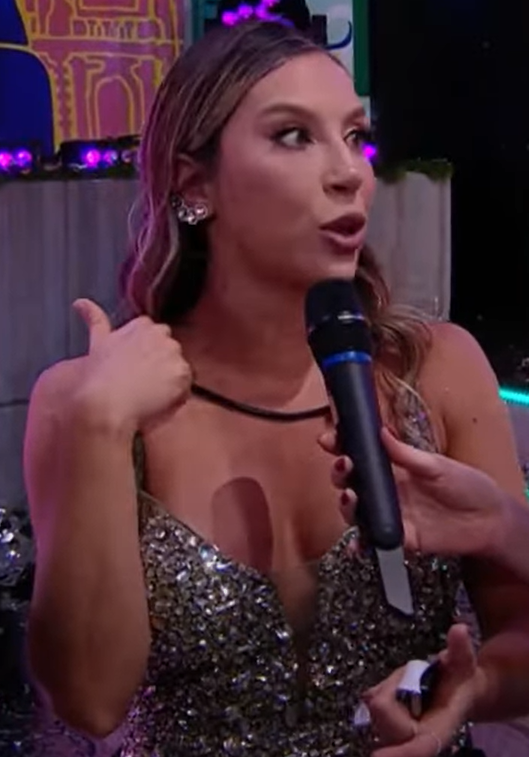
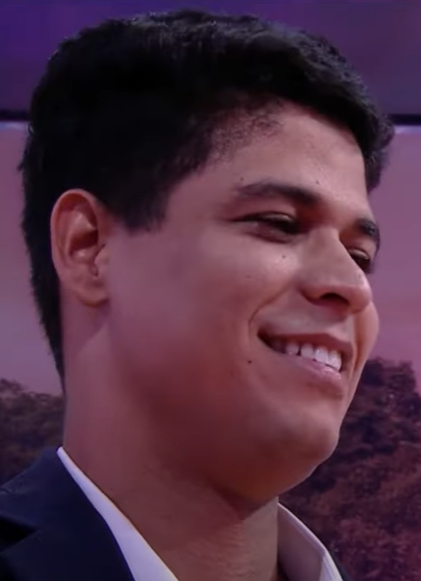
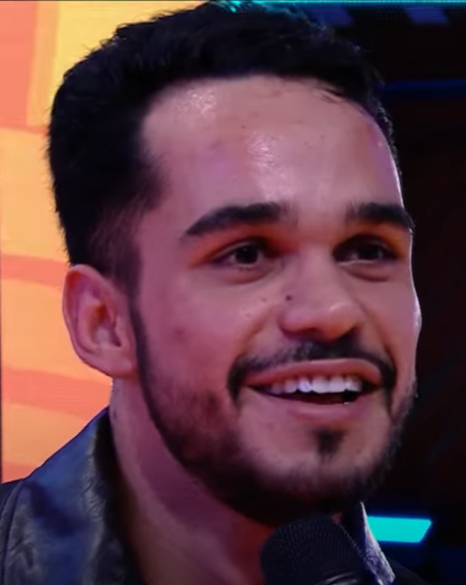
Renata Saldanha (Winner), Guilherme Vilar (Runner-up) and João Pedro Siqueira (Third place), the finalists of Big Brother Brasil 25.

The cast of 22 official housemates was unveiled on January 9, 2025, during breaks in TV Globo programming and on Gshow.

Name	Age	Type	Hometown	Occupation	Partner	Relationship	Day entered	Day exited	Result
Renata Saldanha	32	Civilian	Fortaleza	Dancer	Eva	Friends	1	100	Winner
Guilherme Vilar	27	Wildcard	Olinda	Geriatric physiotherapist	Joselma	Mother-in-Law/Son-in-Law	1	100	Runner-up
João Pedro Siqueira	21	Civilian	Goiatuba	Rodeo lifeguard	João Gabriel	Twin Brothers	1	100	Third place
Vitória Strada	28	Celebrity	Porto Alegre	Actress	Mateus	Friends	1	98	19th Evicted
Diego Hypólito	38	Celebrity	Santo André	Former Olympic gymnast	Daniele	Siblings	1	95	18th Evicted
Joselma Silva	54	Wildcard	Olinda	Housewife	Guilherme	Mother-in-Law/Son-in-Law	1	93	17th Evicted
Vinícius Nascimento	28	Civilian	Nazaré	Event promoter	Aline	Friends	1	91	16th Evicted
Maike Cruz	30	Civilian	São Paulo	Sales representative	Gabriel	Friends	1	88	15th Evicted
João Gabriel Siqueira	21	Civilian	Goiatuba	Rodeo lifeguard	João Pedro	Twin Brothers	1	86	14th Evicted
Daniele Hypólito	40	Celebrity	Santo André	Former Olympic gymnast	Diego	Siblings	1	84	13th Evicted
Vilma Nascimento	68	Celebrity	Aracaju	Nutrition student	Diogo	Mother/Son	1	79	12th Evicted
Eva Pacheco	31	Civilian	Fortaleza	Dancer & physiotherapist	Renata	Friends	1	77	11th Evicted
Aline Patriarca	32	Civilian	Salvador	Military police officer	Vinícius	Friends	1	72	10th Evicted
Gracyanne Barbosa	42	Celebrity	Campo Grande	Fitness model	Giovanna	Sisters	1	65	9th Evicted
Thamiris Maia	33	Civilian	Rio de Janeiro	Nutritionist	Camilla	Sisters	1	58	8th Evicted
Camilla Maia	34	Civilian	Rio de Janeiro	Hair braider	Thamiris	Sisters	1	51	7th Evicted
Diogo Almeida	40	Celebrity	Rio de Janeiro	Actor & psychologist	Vilma	Mother/Son	1	44	6th Evicted
Mateus Pires	28	Celebrity	São José dos Campos	Architect	Vitória	Friends	1	37	5th Evicted
Gabriel Yoshimoto	30	Civilian	São Paulo	Model & event promoter	Maike	Friends	1	30	4th Evicted
Giovanna Jacobina	26	Celebrity	Campo Grande	Veterinarian	Gracyanne	Sisters	1	23	3rd Evicted
Edilberto Simões	42	Civilian	Elói Mendes	Circus owner & clown	Raissa	Father/Daughter	1	16	2nd Evicted
Raissa Simões	19	Civilian	Ubá	Circus artist	Edilberto	Father/Daughter	1	16	2nd Evicted
Arleane Marques	34	Civilian	Manaus	Digital influencer	Marcelo	Couple	1	9	1st Evicted
Marcelo Prata	38	Civilian	Manaus	Public servant	Arleane	Couple	1	9	1st Evicted
Wildcard Pairs
Guilherme Vilar	27	Wildcard	Olinda	Geriatric physiotherapist	Joselma	Mother-in-Law/Son-in-Law	1	1	Selected
Joselma Silva	54	Wildcard	Olinda	Housewife	Guilherme	Mother-in-Law/Son-in-Law	1	1	Selected
Nicole Oliveira	28	Wildcard	São José dos Campos	Law student	Paula	Mother/Daughter	1	1	Not Selected
Paula Oliveira	48	Wildcard	São José dos Campos	Parliamentary advisor	Nicole	Mother/Daughter	1	1	Not Selected
Cléber Santana	24	Wildcard	Jequié	Geography teacher	Joseane	Mother/Son	1	1	Not Selected
Joseane Monteiro	41	Wildcard	Jequié	Nursing technician	Cléber	Mother/Son	1	1	Not Selected

== Voting history ==
Key
– Civilians
– Celebrities
– Wildcard Pairs

	Pre-Game	Pair Phase			Individual Phase																	
	Week 0	Week 1	Week 2	Week 3	Week 4	Week 5	Week 6	Week 7	Week 8	Week 9	Week 10	Week 11		Week 12		Week 13				Week 14		
	Week 0	Week 1	Week 2	Week 3	Week 4	Week 5	Week 6	Week 7	Week 8	Week 9	Week 10	Day 75	Day 77	Day 82	Day 84	Day 86	Day 89		Day 91	Day 93	Day 96	Finale
	Week 0	Week 1	Week 2	Week 3	Week 4	Week 5	Week 6	Week 7	Week 8	Week 9	Week 10	Day 75	Day 77	Day 82	Day 84	Day 86	Round 1	Round 2	Day 91	Day 93	Day 96	Finale
Head of Household	(none)	Aline; Vinícius	Diogo; Vilma	Gabriel; Maike	João Gabriel	Eva	João Pedro	Vitória	Maike	Guilherme	Renata	Maike	Maike	Vitória	Maike	Guilherme	João Pedro		João Pedro	João Pedro	(none)	(none)
Power of Immunity	(none)	Gabriel; Maike	Daniele; Diego	Aline; Vinícius	Mateus	Renata	Guilherme	Vinícius	Joselma	João Gabriel	João Gabriel	João Pedro	(none)	João Gabriel	(none)	(none)	Vinícius		(none)	(none)	(none)	(none)
Saved	(none)	João Gabriel; João Pedro	Aline; Vinícius	Guilherme; Joselma	Mateus	João Gabriel	Joselma	Aline	Guilherme	João Pedro	João Pedro	João Pedro	(none)	João Gabriel	(none)	(none)	Joselma		(none)	(none)	(none)	(none)
Joker Power	(none)	(none)			(none)	(none)	Camilla	Diego	Daniele	Vinícius	Joselma	(none)	(none)	(none)	(none)	(none)	(none)		(none)	(none)	(none)	(none)
Nomination (Twists)	(none)	Mateus; Vitória	~~Daniele~~; ~~Diego~~; Edilberto; Raissa; Guilherme; Joselma	Aline; Vinícius	(none)	Diego	Diogo; ~~Thamiris~~; Vilma	Maike	Aline; Gracyanne	João Gabriel	~~Eva~~; Maike	Vinícius	Vinícius	Daniele	(none)	Vinícius	Renata		(none)	Diego	João Pedro; Renata; Vitória	(none)
Nomination (HoH)	(none)	Arleane; Marcelo; Edilberto; Raissa	Mateus; Vitória	Daniele; Diego	Aline	Mateus	Vitória	Renata	Vinícius	Gracyanne	Aline	Joselma	Diego	João Pedro	Diego	Maike	Vitória		Guilherme	Vitória	(none)	(none)
Nomination (Housemates)	(none)	Diogo; Vilma	Daniele; Diego	Diogo; Vilma; Giovanna; Gracyanne	Diogo; Gabriel; Vitória	Aline; Guilherme	Camilla	Camilla; Vilma	Thamiris	Daniele; Eva	Diego; Vilma	Eva	Vilma	Maike	João Gabriel; Vitória	Renata	Vinícius		Joselma; Renata	Renata	(none)	(none)
Veto Players	(none)	Diogo & Vilma; Mateus & Vitória	Daniele & Diego; Edilberto & Raissa; Guilherme & Joselma	Aline & Vinícius; Diogo & Vilma; Giovanna & Gracyanne	Diogo; Gabriel; Vitória	Aline; Diego; Guilherme	Camilla; Diogo; Vilma	Camilla; Maike; Vilma	Aline; Gracyanne; Thamiris	Daniele; ~~Eva~~; João Gabriel	Diego; Maike; Vilma	(none)									(none)	(none)
Veto Winner(s)	(none)	Mateus; Vitória	Guilherme; Joselma	Aline; Vinícius; Diogo; Vilma	Diogo	Diego	Camilla	Maike	Gracyanne	João Gabriel	Vilma	(none)									(none)	(none)
Renata	Not in House	Daniele; Diego	Daniele; Diego	Giovanna; Gracyanne	Vitória	João Pedro	Camilla	Camilla	Daniele	Joselma	Head of Household	Vitória	Vitória	Joselma	Vitória	Joselma	Joselma	Vinícius	Joselma	Guilherme	Nominated	Winner (Day 100)
Guilherme	Nominated	Giovanna; Gracyanne	Giovanna; Gracyanne	Giovanna; Gracyanne	Gabriel	Thamiris	Camilla	Camilla	Thamiris	Daniele	Vilma	Eva	Vilma	Maike	João Gabriel	Head of Household	Not eligible	Vinícius	Renata	Renata	Exempt	Runner-up (Day 100)
João Pedro	Not in House	Daniele; Diego	Daniele; Diego	Aline; Vinícius	Vitória	Aline	Head of Household	Daniele	Daniele	Daniele	Diego	Vitória	Vitória	Guilherme	Vitória	Joselma	Head of Household		Head of Household	Head of Household	Nominated	Third place (Day 100)
Vitória	Not in House	Diogo; Vilma	Eva; Renata	Diogo; Vilma	Diogo	Joselma	Maike	Head of Household	Thamiris	Eva	Vilma	Eva	Vilma	Head of Household	João Gabriel	Renata	Renata	Vinícius	Renata	Renata	Nominated	Evicted (Day 98)
Diego	Not in House	Gabriel; Maike	Eva; Renata	Diogo; Vilma	Gabriel	Thamiris	Camilla	Vilma; Vilma	Thamiris	Eva	Vilma	Eva	Vilma	Maike	João Gabriel	Renata	Renata	Vinícius	Renata	Renata	Evicted (Day 95)	
Joselma	Nominated	Giovanna; Gracyanne	Giovanna; Gracyanne	Giovanna; Gracyanne	Diogo	Vitória	Camilla	Camilla	Thamiris	Eva	Vilma	Eva	Vilma	Maike	João Gabriel	Renata	Renata	Diego	Renata	Evicted (Day 93)		
Vinícius	Not in House	Diogo; Vilma	Gabriel; Maike	Giovanna; Gracyanne	Diogo	Maike	Maike	Vilma	Thamiris	Eva	Vilma	Eva	Vilma	Maike	João Gabriel	Renata	Not eligible	Diego	Evicted (Day 91)			
Maike	Not in House	Daniele; Diego	Daniele; Diego	Co-Head of Household	Vinícius	Aline	Aline	Daniele	Head of Household	Daniele	Joselma	Head of Household	Head of Household	Guilherme	Head of Household	Joselma	Evicted (Day 88)					
João Gabriel	Not in House	Daniele; Diego	Daniele; Diego	Aline; Vinícius	Head of Household	Aline	Aline	Not eligible	Daniele	Daniele	Diego	Vitória	Vitória	Guilherme	Vitória	Evicted (Day 86)						
Daniele	Not in House	Gabriel; Maike	Eva; Renata	Diogo; Vilma	Diogo	Vitória	Maike	Vilma	Thamiris ^{(×2)}	Eva	Vilma	Eva	Vilma	Maike	Evicted (Day 84)							
Vilma	Not in House	Mateus; Vitória	Daniele; Diego	Giovanna; Gracyanne	Vitória	Vinícius	Camilla	Camilla	Daniele	Joselma	Joselma	Vitória	Vitória	Evicted (Day 79)								
Eva	Not in House	Daniele; Diego	Daniele; Diego	Giovanna; Gracyanne	Camilla	Head of Household	Camilla	Camilla	Daniele	Joselma	Diego	Vitória	Evicted (Day 77)									
Aline	Not in House	Diogo; Vilma	Gabriel; Maike	Giovanna; Gracyanne	Gabriel	Maike	Maike	João Gabriel	Thamiris	Eva	Vilma	Evicted (Day 72)										
Gracyanne	Not in House	Diogo; Vilma	Eva; Renata	Diogo; Vilma	Diogo	Guilherme	Renata	Vilma	Aline	Aline	Evicted (Day 65)											
Thamiris	Not in House	Diogo; Vilma	Eva; Renata	Diogo; Vilma	Diogo	Guilherme	Renata	Vilma	Daniele	Evicted (Day 58)												
Camilla	Not in House	Diogo; Vilma	Eva; Renata	Diogo; Vilma	Diogo	Guilherme	Renata	Vilma	Evicted (Day 51)													
Diogo	Not in House	Mateus; Vitória	Daniele; Diego	Giovanna; Gracyanne	Vitória	Vinícius	Camilla	Evicted (Day 44)														
Mateus	Not in House	Diogo; Vilma	Eva; Renata	Diogo; Vilma	Diogo	Guilherme	Evicted (Day 37)															
Gabriel	Not in House	Daniele; Diego	Daniele; Diego	Co-Head of Household	Guilherme	Evicted (Day 30)																
Giovanna	Not in House	Diogo; Vilma	Eva; Renata	Diogo; Vilma	Evicted (Day 23)																	
Edilberto	Not in House	Mateus; Vitória	Daniele; Diego	Evicted (Day 16)																		
Raissa	Not in House	Mateus; Vitória	Daniele; Diego	Evicted (Day 16)																		
Arleane	Not in House	Mateus; Vitória	Evicted (Day 9)																			
Marcelo	Not in House	Mateus; Vitória	Evicted (Day 9)																			
Nicole	Nominated	Evicted (Annex)																				
Paula	Nominated	Evicted (Annex)																				
Cléber	Nominated	Evicted (Annex)																				
Joseane	Nominated	Evicted (Annex)																				
Notes	1	1, 2, 3, 4, 5, 6	2, 7, 8, 9	2, 10, 11, 12, 13, 14	14, 15, 16	17, 18	19, 20	11, 21, 22, 23, 24	25, 26	11, 27, 28, 29, 30	11, 31, 32	15, 24, 33	24, 34	15, 35	11	24, 36	37		11	38	39	40
Nominated for Eviction	Cléber & Joseane; Guilherme & Joselma; Nicole & Paula	Arleane & Marcelo; Diogo & Vilma; Edilberto & Raissa	Daniele & Diego; Edilberto & Raissa; Mateus & Vitória	Daniele; Diego; Giovanna; Gracyanne	Aline; Gabriel; Vitória	Aline; Guilherme; Mateus	Diogo; Vilma; Vitória	Camilla; Renata; Vilma	Aline; Thamiris; Vinícius	Daniele; Eva; Gracyanne	Aline; Diego; Maike	Eva; Joselma; Vinícius	Diego; Vilma; Vinícius	Daniele; João Pedro; Maike	Diego; João Gabriel; Vitória	Maike; Renata; Vinícius	Renata; Vinícius; Vitória		Guilherme; Joselma; Renata	Diego; Renata; Vitória	João Pedro; Renata; Vitória	Guilherme; João Pedro; Renata
Evicted	Cléber; Joseane; 14% to enter	Arleane; Marcelo; 56% to evict	Edilberto; Raissa; 51% to evict	Giovanna; 53% to evict	Gabriel; 49% to evict	Mateus; 65% to evict	Diogo; 44% to evict	Camilla; 95% to evict	Thamiris; 62% to evict	Gracyanne; 51% to evict	Aline; 52% to evict	Eva; 51% to evict	Vilma; 59% to evict	Daniele; 50% to evict	João Gabriel; 52% to evict	Maike; 49% to evict	Vinícius; 53% to evict		Joselma; 67% to evict	Diego; 60% to evict	Vitória; 54% to evict	João Pedro; 5% to win
Evicted	Nicole; Paula; 20% to enter	Arleane; Marcelo; 56% to evict	Edilberto; Raissa; 51% to evict	Giovanna; 53% to evict	Gabriel; 49% to evict	Mateus; 65% to evict	Diogo; 44% to evict	Camilla; 95% to evict	Thamiris; 62% to evict	Gracyanne; 51% to evict	Aline; 52% to evict	Eva; 51% to evict	Vilma; 59% to evict	Daniele; 50% to evict	João Gabriel; 52% to evict	Maike; 49% to evict	Vinícius; 53% to evict		Joselma; 67% to evict	Diego; 60% to evict	Vitória; 54% to evict	Guilherme; 43% to win
Survived	Guilherme; Joselma; 66% to enter	Diogo; Vilma; 36% to evict	Mateus; Vitória; 43% to evict	Gracyanne; 26% to evict	Vitória; 43% to evict	Aline; 25% to evict	Vitória; 33% to evict	Renata; 3% to evict	Aline; 36% to evict	Eva; 44% to evict	Maike; 47% to evict	Vinícius; 45% to evict	Vinícius; 40% to evict	João Pedro; 45% to evict	Diego; 46% to evict	Vinícius; 48% to evict	Renata; 46% to evict		Renata; 30% to evict	Renata; 39% to evict	João Pedro; 39% to evict	Renata; 52% to win
Survived	Guilherme; Joselma; 66% to enter	Diogo; Vilma; 36% to evict	Mateus; Vitória; 43% to evict	Daniele; 17% to evict	Vitória; 43% to evict	Aline; 25% to evict	Vitória; 33% to evict	Renata; 3% to evict	Aline; 36% to evict	Eva; 44% to evict	Maike; 47% to evict	Vinícius; 45% to evict	Vinícius; 40% to evict	João Pedro; 45% to evict	Diego; 46% to evict	Vinícius; 48% to evict	Renata; 46% to evict		Renata; 30% to evict	Renata; 39% to evict	João Pedro; 39% to evict	Renata; 52% to win
Survived	Guilherme; Joselma; 66% to enter	Edilberto; Raissa; 8% to evict	Daniele; Diego; 6% to evict	Daniele; 17% to evict	Aline; 8% to evict	Guilherme; 10% to evict	Vilma; 23% to evict	Vilma; 2% to evict	Vinícius; 2% to evict	Daniele; 5% to evict	Diego; 1% to evict	Joselma; 4% to evict	Diego; 1% to evict	Maike; 5% to evict	Vitória; 2% to evict	Renata; 3% to evict	Vitória; 1% to evict		Guilherme; 3% to evict	Vitória; 1% to evict	Renata; 7% to evict	Renata; 52% to win
Survived	Guilherme; Joselma; 66% to enter	Edilberto; Raissa; 8% to evict	Daniele; Diego; 6% to evict	Diego; 4% to evict	Aline; 8% to evict	Guilherme; 10% to evict	Vilma; 23% to evict	Vilma; 2% to evict	Vinícius; 2% to evict	Daniele; 5% to evict	Diego; 1% to evict	Joselma; 4% to evict	Diego; 1% to evict	Maike; 5% to evict	Vitória; 2% to evict	Renata; 3% to evict	Vitória; 1% to evict		Guilherme; 3% to evict	Vitória; 1% to evict	Renata; 7% to evict	Renata; 52% to win
Votes	2,498,763	6,518,180	32,317,620	15,522,296	28,846,680	12,731,866	75,179,408	26,341,897	30,601,080	119,743,011	209,254,975	192,551,976	103,726,845	85,364,342	47,194,466	120,892,493	136,259,718		56,941,556	103,742,694	88,891,444	178,478,637

=== Notes ===
- ^Note 1: Three days before the season premiere, 3 potential pairs housemates were revealed to the public, who began vote for one pair to enter the game. Guilherme & Joselma received the most votes entered the House and won immunity from the first nominations.
- ^Note 2: During Weeks 1–3, all housemates competed as pairs. Pairs would win competitions and hold power together, and would vote and be nominated together.
- ^Note 3: On Day 1, the housemates competed in an endurance competition for immunity. After 6 hours, Eva & Renata won immunity for the first nominations.
- ^Note 4: This week, Aline & Vinícius, the HoHs, had to nominate for two different pairs housemates for eviction. The first nominees had to be chosen shortly after the end of the HoH competition. They nominated Edilberto & Raissa. On Sunday voting, the HoHs had to make them second nomination between the pairs housemates chosen to the "HoH's Crosshairs" (Arleane & Marcelo, Diogo & Vilma and João Gabriel & João Pedro). They nominated Arleane & Marcelo.
- ^Note 5: As Heads of Household, Aline & Vinícius was forced to break the tie between Daniele & Diego, Diogo & Vilma and Mateus & Vitória (with three votes each). They nominated Diogo & Vilma.
- ^Note 6: This week, the House's nominees had the power to name an additional nominees. During the nominations, the housemates nominated Diogo & Vilma, who in turn nominated Mateus & Vitória.
- ^Note 7: On Day 13, Maike answered the Big Phone and he and Gabriel was awarded immunity and instructed to nominate one pair housemates for eviction. They chose Daniele & Diego. On Day 14, the Big Phone was canceled after production, warned by viewers, review the footage from Maike dropping the Monster Punishment object to answer the Big Phone, which was against the rules of Monster Punishment. As result, Gabriel & Maike had their immunity cancelled and Daniele & Diego was saved from eviction. Because of this, on the same day, the Big Phone rang again, and Camilla answered the Big Phone and was given the same task. She and Thamiris was awarded immunity and nominated Edilberto & Raissa.
- ^Note 8: As Heads of Household, Diogo & Vilma was forced to break the tie between Daniele & Diego and Eva & Renata (with four votes each). They nominated Daniele & Diego.
- ^Note 9: This week, the Big Phone's nominees had the power to name an additional nominees. Before the nominations, Camilla & Thamiris, with Camilla answered the Big Phone, nominated Edilberto & Raissa, who in turn nominated Guilherme & Joselma.
- ^Note 10: On Day 17, Eva answered the Big Phone and she and Renata was awarded a special lunch and instructed to invite two pairs to lunch with them. They chose Gabriel & Maike and Guilherme & Joselma. At the end of the lunch, the three pairs had to decide which one of them would receive immunity. The pairs chose gave immunity to Eva & Renata.
- ^Note 11: This week, the top 2 vote recipients became the House's nominees.
- ^Note 12: This week, the House's nominees (the top 2 vote from the house) had the power to name an additional nominee, as a group. During the nominations, the housemates nominated Diogo & Vilma and Giovanna & Gracyanne, who in turn nominated Aline & Vinícius.
- ^Note 13: Week 3 a double Veto. Of the 3 pairs Veto players, 2 would win a veto and avoid nominations, leaving the other one pair facing Brazil's vote alongside the HoH's nominees.
- ^Note 14: Unbeknownst to the housemates, Week 3’s eviction was the first individual eviction. The pairs split up on Day 23 after the reveal of the public vote. While Giovanna & Gracyanne were announced as the evicted pair, only Giovanna was officially evicted as the nominee with the most votes. Gracyanne was secretly sent to the Secret Room for 2 days where she could watch her housemates. She was awarded immunity for week 4 upon her return.
- ^Note 15: This week, the Power of Immunity winner won immunity for themselves, rather than having to give immunity to someone. They were only told of this fact during Live Nominations.
- ^Note 16: This week, the top 3 vote recipients became the House's nominees.
- ^Note 17: The first six housemates eliminated from Week 5's HoH competition (Joselma, Maike, Aline, Diego, Daniele and Camilla) would each draw a 'bottle of consequences'. Joselma and Camilla automatically became a Have-Not, Maike had to eliminate another housemate from the competition, with Diego being the chosen, Aline was vetoed from this week's Power of Immunity competition, Diego was automatically nominated for eviction, and Daniele could't received immunity this week.
- ^Note 18: For this week's nominations, the housemates were divided into two groups (50's and North East), and were required to vote for one person on the same group. The housemate with the most votes in each group was nominated.
- ^Note 19: On Day 41, Diogo answered the Big Phone and was automatically nominated for eviction and instructed to nominate an additional housemate. He chose Thamiris.
- ^Note 20: As the winner of this week's Joker Power, Camilla had the power to exchange one of the Big Phone's nominees (Diogo or Thamiris) by another housemate or not interfere with the nominations. Before the nominations took place, Camilla decided to use her Power of Veto and saved Thamiris from the block, replacing her with Vilma on the nomination.
- ^Note 21: On Day 53, Vinícius pressed the surprise button in the backyard and was automatically sent to the Challenge Room. Additionally, required to veto one housemate from competing in the upcoming HoH competition. He chose Maike. He competed in an competition, if he completed it, they would become a Have, receive immunity, and veto a second housemate from competing in the next HoH competition; however, if he unsuccessfully completed the challenge, they would be a Have-Not, be automatically nominated, and not be eligible to be HoH that week. Vinícius won the challenge and was awarded immunity, was automatically became a Have and chose to veto Vilma from the upcoming HoH competition.
- ^Note 22: As the winner of this week's Power of Immunity, Vinícius had the power to nominate one of the two housemates who had received the Monster Punishment (Maike and Vilma) someone for eviction on Sunday. He nominated Maike.
- ^Note 23: As the winner of this week's Joker Power, Diego was required to ban one housemate from voting and had to vote twice during nominations. He chose to ban João Gabriel from voting and voted twice on Vilma.
- ^Note 24: This week, the housemates voted in Face-to-Face nominations instead of voting in the Diary Room.
- ^Note 25: On Day 56, Daniele answered the Big Phone and was awarded this week's Joker Power and sent to the Secret Store, where she were allowed to purchase one of the following powers: "Power of Immunity Veto", "Double Vote", "Deviation Power", "Power of Cancel", "Immunity" and "Higher Power". As the winner of this week's Joker Power, Daniele chose "Double Vote", who making her vote count as two. Daniele's vote on Thamiris counted as two.
- ^Note 26: This week, the House's nominee had the power to name an additional nominee. During the nominations, the housemates nominated Thamiris, who in turn nominated Aline. Furthermore, Aline, as Counterattack's nominee, had the power to name another additional nominee. She nominated Gracyanne.
- ^Note 27: This week, the housemates competed in a popular vote, where the public voted for who should go to "Mr. Fifi's Showcase", a new twist of the Glass House, but the housemates did not know this. The housemate who received the most votes from the public would enter the environment, where he would stay for a while, having the privilege of interacting with visitors and receiving external information about the game, and returning with immunity to the house. Renata received the most votes and went to the Glass House on Day 60, where they were able to interact with the public and receive information from the outside world, returning with immunity to the house in the next day.
- ^Note 28: As Head of Household, Guilherme was forced to break the tie between Daniele and Joselma (with three votes each) to determine the House's second nominee. He nominated Daniele.
- ^Note 29: This week, the HoH's nominee had the power to name an additional nominee, who required to be one of the housemates chosen to the "HoH's Crosshairs". During the nominations, Guilherme, as HoH, nominated Gracyanne, who in turn nominated João Gabriel.
- ^Note 30: As the winner of this week's Joker Power, Vinícius was required to veto one of the three nominees from competing in this week's Veto competition, thus going straight to Brazil's vote alongside the HoH's nominee. He chose Eva.
- ^Note 31: On Day 69, Vinícius answered the Big Phone and was told to immediately nominate two housemates for eviction. He chose Eva and Maike.
- ^Note 32: As the winner of this week's Joker Power, Joselma had the power to veto one of the Big Phone's nominees (Eva or Maike). Before the nominations took place, Joselma saved Eva from the block, leaving Maike as a nominee for the eviction. In addition, Eva received immunity for nominations.
- ^Note 33: On Day 74, the duo finalist of the HoH competition won the power to choose one housemate each to competed in an throwing competition, where the loser was nominated for eviction. Maike and Diego were finalists in the HoH competition and chose Vinícius and João Gabriel, respectively. João Gabriel won the competition, while Vinícius, as the loser, was automatically nominated for eviction.
- ^Note 34: On Day 77, the House's nominee had the power to name an additional nominee. During the nominations, the housemates nominated Vilma, who in turn nominated Vinícius.
- ^Note 35: On Day 82, Joselma and Maike, who were finalists in the HoH competition (except for the winner), won the power to choose, as a duo, one housemate to nominate for eviction. They nominated Daniele.
- ^Note 36: On Day 86, the HoH's nominee had the power to name an additional nominee. During the nominations, Guilherme, as HoH, nominated Maike, who in turn nominated Vinícius.
- ^Note 37: On Day 88, the four housemates who placed the lowest in the HoH competition (Joselma, Renata, Diego and Vitória) was required to vote among themselves to nominate someone for eviction. Renata was nominated for eviction by a 3–1–0–0 vote, over Joselma, Diego and Vitória, respectively.
- ^Note 38: On Day 93, the last place of the HoH competition was nominated for eviction. Diego was the last place of the competition and was automatically nominated for eviction.
- ^Note 39: Guilherme won the final competition, winning immunity for the final eviction and granting his place in the Finale. João Pedro, Renata and Vitória were automatically nominated for eviction by default.
- ^Note 40: For the final, the public will vote for the housemate they want to win Big Brother Brasil 25.

=== Public vote results ===
Week		Housemate	Vote		Average
Week		Housemate	Single	Fan	Average
0		Cléber; Joseane	12.12%	15.36%	13.74%
0		Guilherme; Joselma	68.30%	64.49%	66.40%
0		Nicole; Paula	19.58%	20.15%	19.86%
1		Arleane; Marcelo	56.75%	55.13%	55.95%
1		Diogo; Vilma	32.80%	39.21%	36.00%
1		Edilberto; Raissa	10.45%	5.66%	8.05%
2		Daniele; Diego	9.12%	2.46%	5.79%
2		Edilberto; Raissa	48.21%	53.20%	50.70%
2		Mateus; Vitória	42.67%	44.34%	43.51%
3		Daniele	18.56%	15.59%	17.07%
3		Diego	6.47%	2.46%	4.46%
3		Giovanna	52.68%	52.52%	52.61%
3		Gracyanne	22.29%	29.43%	25.86%
4		Aline	11.86%	4.76%	8.31%
4		Gabriel	52.38%	45.24%	48.81%
4		Vitória	35.76%	50.00%	42.88%
5		Aline	24.92%	24.33%	24.63%
5		Guilherme	10.67%	9.47%	10.07%
5		Mateus	64.41%	66.20%	65.30%
6		Diogo	45.35%	42.50%	43.93%
6		Vilma	30.39%	16.54%	23.46%
6		Vitória	24.26%	40.96%	32.61%
7		Camilla	93.31%	96.03%	94.67%
7		Renata	3.31%	2.16%	2.74%
7		Vilma	3.38%	1.81%	2.59%
8		Aline	33.00%	38.93%	35.97%
8		Thamiris	63.83%	59.64%	61.73%
8		Vinícius	3.17%	1.43%	2.30%
9		Daniele	7.79%	2.24%	5.02%
9		Eva	45.73%	41.47%	43.60%
9		Gracyanne	46.48%	56.29%	51.38%
10		Aline	45.10%	58.36%	51.73%
10		Diego	1.58%	0.28%	0.93%
10		Maike	53.32%	41.36%	47.34%
11	Day 77	Eva	58.60%	44.10%	51.35%
11	Day 77	Joselma	6.89%	1.36%	4.13%
11	Day 77	Vinícius	34.51%	54.54%	44.52%
11	Day 79	Diego	2.29%	0.51%	1.40%
11	Day 79	Vilma	63.30%	54.52%	58.91%
11	Day 79	Vinícius	34.41%	44.97%	39.69%
12	Day 84	Daniele	45.04%	55.70%	50.37%
12	Day 84	João Pedro	48.88%	41.87%	45.38%
12	Day 84	Maike	6.08%	2.43%	4.25%
12	Day 86	Diego	38.92%	52.60%	45.76%
12	Day 86	João Gabriel	57.82%	46.07%	51.95%
12	Day 86	Vitória	3.26%	1.33%	2.29%
13	Day 88	Maike	54.37%	43.87%	49.12%
13	Day 88	Renata	4.81%	0.92%	2.86%
13	Day 88	Vinícius	40.82%	55.21%	48.02%
13	Day 91	Renata	52.64%	39.83%	46.23%
13	Day 91	Vinícius	45.55%	59.81%	52.69%
13	Day 91	Vitória	1.81%	0.36%	1.08%
13	Day 93	Guilherme	2.98%	1.87%	2.42%
13	Day 93	Joselma	58.81%	75.55%	67.19%
13	Day 93	Renata	38.21%	22.58%	30.39%
14	Day 95	Diego	52.35%	67.19%	59.77%
14	Day 95	Renata	46.09%	32.43%	39.26%
14	Day 95	Vitória	1.56%	0.38%	0.97%
14	Day 98	João Pedro	41.42%	36.42%	38.92%
14	Day 98	Renata	10.24%	2.88%	6.56%
14	Day 98	Vitória	48.34%	60.70%	54.52%
Finale		Guilherme	51.40%	35.37%	43.38%
Finale		João Pedro	6.22%	3.22%	4.72%
Finale		Renata	42.38%	61.41%	51.90%

=== Have and Have-Nots ===
	Week 1		Week 2^{1}	Week 3	Week 4		Week 5		Week 6	Week 7^{4}	Week 8	Week 9	Week 10		Week 11		Week 12		Week 13			Week 14	
	Day 1	Day 4	Week 2^{1}	Week 3	Day 25^{2}		Day 32	Day 35^{3}	Week 6	Week 7^{4}	Week 8	Week 9	Day 66^{5}	Day 67	Day 74	Day 77	Day 81	Day 84	Day 86	Day 88	Day 91	Day 93	Day 96
Renata	Have	Have	Have-Not	Have	Have-Not	Have-Not	Have-Not	Have-Not	Have	Have-Not	Have-Not	Have	Have-Not	Have	Have-Not	Have	Have-Not	Have	Have-Not	Have	Have	Have	Have
Guilherme	Have	Have	Have-Not	Have-Not	Have-Not	Have-Not	Have-Not	Have-Not	Have-Not	Have-Not	Have-Not	Have	Have	Have	Have-Not	Have-Not	Have-Not	Have-Not	Have	Have-Not	Have-Not	Have-Not	Have
João Pedro	Have	Have-Not	Have	Have	Have-Not	Have	Have-Not	Have-Not	Have	Have-Not	Have	Have-Not	Have-Not	Have-Not	Have	Have-Not	Have-Not	Have	Have-Not	Have	Have	Have	Have
Vitória	Have	Have-Not	Have-Not	Have-Not	Have-Not	Have-Not	Have-Not	Have-Not	Have-Not	Have	Have-Not	Have-Not	Have-Not	Have-Not	Have-Not	Have-Not	Have	Have-Not	Have-Not	Have-Not	Have-Not	Have-Not	Have
Diego	Have	Have-Not	Have-Not	Have-Not	Have-Not	Have-Not	Have-Not	Have-Not	Have-Not	Have	Have-Not	Have-Not	Have-Not	Have-Not	Have-Not	Have-Not	Have	Have-Not	Have-Not	Have-Not	Have-Not	Have-Not	
Joselma	Have	Have	Have-Not	Have-Not	Have-Not	Have	Have-Not	Have-Not	Have	Have-Not	Have-Not	Have	Have	Have	Have-Not	Have-Not	Have-Not	Have-Not	Have	Have-Not	Have		
Vinícius	Have	Have	Have-Not	Have-Not	Have-Not	Have-Not	Have	Have-Not	Have-Not	Have	Have-Not	Have-Not	Have	Have	Have-Not	Have-Not	Have-Not	Have-Not	Have-Not	Have			
Maike	Have	Have-Not	Have-Not	Have	Have-Not	Have	Have	Have-Not	Have	Have-Not	Have	Have-Not	Have-Not	Have-Not	Have	Have	Have-Not	Have	Have-Not				
João Gabriel	Have	Have-Not	Have	Have	Have-Not	Have	Have-Not	Have-Not	Have	Have-Not	Have	Have-Not	Have-Not	Have-Not	Have	Have-Not	Have-Not	Have-Not					
Daniele	Have	Have-Not	Have-Not	Have-Not	Have-Not	Have-Not	Have-Not	Have-Not	Have-Not	Have-Not	Have-Not	Have	Have-Not	Have-Not	Have-Not	Have-Not	Have						
Vilma	Have-Not	Have-Not	Have	Have-Not	Have-Not	Have-Not	Have	Have-Not	Have-Not	Have-Not	Have	Have-Not	Have-Not	Have-Not	Have	Have							
Eva	Have	Have	Have-Not	Have	Have-Not	Have-Not	Have	Have-Not	Have-Not	Have-Not	Have-Not	Have-Not	Have-Not	Have	Have-Not								
Aline	Have	Have	Have-Not	Have-Not	Have-Not	Have-Not	Have	Have-Not	Have-Not	Have-Not	Have-Not	Have	Have-Not	Have-Not									
Gracyanne	Have	Have-Not	Have-Not	Have-Not	Have	Have	Have-Not	Have-Not	Have-Not	Have-Not	Have-Not	Have-Not											
Thamiris	Have-Not	Have	Have-Not	Have-Not	Have-Not	Have-Not	Have-Not	Have-Not	Have-Not	Have	Have-Not												
Camilla	Have-Not	Have	Have-Not	Have-Not	Have-Not	Have-Not	Have-Not	Have-Not	Have-Not	Have-Not													
Diogo	Have-Not	Have-Not	Have	Have-Not	Have-Not	Have-Not	Have-Not	Have-Not	Have-Not														
Mateus	Have	Have-Not	Have-Not	Have-Not	Have-Not	Have-Not	Have-Not	Have-Not															
Gabriel	Have	Have-Not	Have-Not	Have	Have-Not	Have																	
Giovanna	Have	Have-Not	Have-Not	Have-Not																			
Edilberto	Have	Have-Not	Have																				
Raissa	Have	Have-Not	Have																				
Arleane	Have-Not	Have-Not																					
Marcelo	Have-Not	Have-Not																					

- ^Note 1: On week 2, Gabriel & Maike became have-not after Daniele & Diego picked them for the Monster Punishment.
- ^Note 2: On week 4, due to break the rules of Freeze, where everyone should stand still during return of Gracyanne, as Fake Evicted after her pair partner was evicted, the all housemates become have-nots until the middle of the week.
- ^Note 3: On week 5, due to various punishments, the all housemates become have-nots until the end of the week.
- ^Note 4: On week 7, Vinícius became have after earning a Have-Not Pass for winning the competition from the Challenge Room.
- ^Note 5: On week 10, due to twist of Take or Keep, the all housemates become have-nots until the middle of the week, except Guilherme, Joselma and Vinícius who became have and earning a Have-Not Pass.

== Controversies ==
=== Accusation of psychological abuse ===
Diogo Almeida faced criticism when he nominated Aline Patriarca by Counterattack in the Week 3's nominations on February 2, even though he was just beginning a relationship with her. Military police officer Aline argued with Diogo in the show's pool. The housemate was disappointed with the actor, with whom she had a relationship in the house and had her first kiss during the after of the Wednesday Show that week, after the pairs Gracyanne & Giovanna and Diogo & Vilma unanimously nominated Aline and her pair partner Vinícius for eviction with them.

The next day, when questioned, he interrupted Aline several times and told her to be silent, and at one point, asked her to lower her voice. “Keep your voice down!”, he said, in a tone that many considered authoritarian. Tired of trying to make herself understood, Patriarca replied: “It’s very difficult to talk to you”. The scene generated debates among viewers about possible psychological abuse, out toxic and sexist behavior.

=== Accusation of homophobia ===
Insinuating comments about Diego Hypólito, made by Gabriel Yoshimoto, Diogo Almeida, João Gabriel Siqueira and João Pedro Siqueira due to his sexual orientation, generated negative repercussions from the public, especially because Gabriel kept imitating the gymnast behind his back or even pitching his voice in a derogatory manner. The episode was classified by journalists as "recreational homophobia".

Maike Cruz was also accused of homophobia due to the difference in treatment he gave Hypólito in the house, even opening a rivalry with the athlete. The case raised suspicions of a feud involving the swimmer's family and the Olympic medalist before the show.

=== Lack of interest of housemates ===
The season had been criticized by the public and journalists for the lack of impactful conflicts in situations identical to those already observed in 19th, 22nd and 23rd season, in addition to the total lack of interest of the housemates in taking the dynamics presented seriously.

The host himself even scolded the cast live, with the situation reaching its limit before the Week 5's HoH competition on February 13, 2025, when João Gabriel Siqueira and João Pedro Siqueira were automatically eliminated for using the bathroom while the rules of the challenge were being read, and were also warned by host Tadeu Schmidt. In addition to the twins, Renata Saldanha was also eliminated for going to the bedroom to put in eye drops at the same time that caused the two brothers' punishment.

=== Accusations of sexism ===
On January 31, during the Week 3's HoH endurance competition, a comment involving Gabriel Yoshimoto and João Gabriel Siqueira involving Aline Patriarca caused controversy on social media. When commenting on the relationship between Aline and Diogo Almeida, who kissed during the most recent party, the housemates insinuated that the actor was being guided only by sexual thoughts. "What doesn't a p**** do?", commented João Gabriel, and Gabriel agreed, adding: "You saw that I already said it twice. Maike [Cruz] who stops me... Oh, bro... You're going to keep thinking with your d**k head, you're going to get screwed, bro". Aline's team later spoke out on social media, condemning the housemates' comments. In a statement, they stated that the comments were "sexist" and "machists", reinforcing the idea that all women deserve respect.

On February 8, after João Gabriel offered "The HoH's Crosshairs" bracelet to Aline, the housemate showed surprise and seemed intrigued by the nomination, which triggered explosive reactions from the HoH of the week João Gabriel and his twin brother João Pedro Siqueira. João Gabriel, João Pedro, Gabriel Yoshimoto and Maike Cruz met in the HoH's room. They commented on Aline's reaction, who was outraged at having received the bracelet nominating that she is in "The HoH's Crosshairs". "She really should listen. Give moral to that rabble. Say it to their face. Isn't she the 'big girl'? Isn't she a military police officer?", declared João Pedro. His friends asked him to stop. Aline's team responded to the attacks on social media, calling the twins "Lions in the room".

=== Racial bias in the program ===
==== Thamiris Maia and Renata Saldanha ====
In a conversation on February 3, Thamiris Maia had vented to Renata Saldanha about a comment the dancer had made about Camilla Maia, her sister. During a conversation between Camilla, Maike Cruz and Renata, the housemate had said that the hair braider could not participate in a twist of the show because she was in Have-Not and had supposedly taken on the position of cook in the house. Upon hearing the comment, the hair braider had a crying fit and was calmed down by the nutritionist, as well as Eva Pacheco and Renata for the comment, with Renata apologizing for what she said, stating that it was Maike who had started talking about the subject first.

==== Vitória Strada and Camilla Maia ====
After the Week 6's nominations were held on February 23, Vitória Strada had questioned Camilla Maia about why the HoH of the week, João Pedro Siqueira, had nominated her for the eviction that day, with the two having a heated discussion in the house, with the braider accusing the actress of putting her as an "aggressive black woman", being countered by Guilherme Vilar and Diego Hypólito, with the latter calming Strada down after the fight. At another point, Vitória stated that both Camilla and her sister, Thamiris Maia, had distanced themselves from her in the game, with Thamiris coming to her sister's defense, stating that the relationship had not changed and that it was Vitória who distanced herself.

In the "Big Sincere" the following day, Camilla accused Vitória of having made a racist speech against her in the house, with former housemate Ana Paula Renault disapproving of such insinuation in the dynamic while participating as a guest on the show. The situation ended up generating a negative repercussion on social media, with Camilla being accused of emptying a racial agenda in her favor, leading even the singer and also former housemate, Pocah, to speak out in favor of Strada.

=== Accusation of sexual harassment ===
During the party on April 9, Maike Cruz made advances towards housemate Renata Saldanha. In videos that circulated on social media, the housemate had bitten Saldanha's arm and then pulled her hair, leading the housemate to ask Maike to stop, as the situation was getting out of control. As a result, Cruz received fourteen warnings from the production team. In another video taken by the public, Maike appeared excited and with an erect penis in front of all the housemates and during a conversation with Joselma Silva, the housemate had said that he would try a relationship with the housewife's daughter, leading to disapproval from Joselma and Renata in the speech.

Due to what happened, the public started posting tags asking for Maike's ejection from X/Twitter, and there was also pressure for sponsors to speak out, leading TV Globo to analyze the images, however, no action was taken. In the end, Maike ended up being the 15th evicted from the program the following day (10) in public vote against Vinícius Nascimento and Renata Saldanha.

== Ratings and reception ==
=== Brazilian ratings ===
All numbers are in points and provided by Kantar Ibope Media.

Week	First air date	Last air date	Timeslot (BRT)	Daily SP viewers (in points)							SP viewers (in points)	BR viewers (in points)	Ref.
Week	First air date	Last air date	Timeslot (BRT)	Mon	Tue	Wed	Thu	Fri	Sat	Sun	SP viewers (in points)	BR viewers (in points)	Ref.
1	January 13, 2025	January 19, 2025	Monday to Saturday; 10:30 p.m. Sunday; 11:00 p.m.	17.0	16.2	16.7	16.0	17.0	16.1	12.7	16.0	Outside top 10	
2	January 20, 2025	January 26, 2025	Monday to Saturday; 10:30 p.m. Sunday; 11:00 p.m.	16.9	16.9	16.0	17.0	17.8	15.3	13.4	16.2	Outside top 10	
3	January 27, 2025	February 2, 2025	Monday to Saturday; 10:30 p.m. Sunday; 11:00 p.m.	17.2	16.7	18.1	15.9	18.5	15.4	13.0	16.4	Outside top 10	
4	February 3, 2025	February 9, 2025	Monday to Saturday; 10:30 p.m. Sunday; 11:00 p.m.	17.4	16.9	16.4	16.2	17.0	17.9	14.1	16.6	Outside top 10	
5	February 10, 2025	February 16, 2025	Monday to Saturday; 10:30 p.m. Sunday; 11:00 p.m.	17.0	16.9	14.3	17.2	17.6	16.0	14.8	16.3	Outside top 10	
6	February 17, 2025	February 23, 2025	Monday to Saturday; 10:30 p.m. Sunday; 11:00 p.m.	17.9	16.0	12.1	16.9	15.8	15.2	14.4	15.4	Outside top 10	
7	February 24, 2025	March 2, 2025	Monday to Saturday; 10:30 p.m. Sunday; 11:00 p.m.	17.3	18.0	13.8	17.5	18.0	17.0	11.9	16.2	Outside top 10	
8	March 3, 2025	March 9, 2025	Monday to Saturday; 10:30 p.m. Sunday; 11:00 p.m.	18.3	19.7	11.6	18.0	18.3	16.2	14.1	16.6	Outside top 10	
9	March 10, 2025	March 16, 2025	Monday to Saturday; 10:30 p.m. Sunday; 11:00 p.m.	15.0	17.8	14.8	17.7	18.2	17.4	13.9	16.4	Outside top 10	
10	March 17, 2025	March 23, 2025	Monday to Saturday; 10:30 p.m. Sunday; 11:00 p.m.	17.9	17.2	18.0	13.2	15.8	16.5	13.3	15.9	Outside top 10	
11	March 24, 2025	March 30, 2025	Monday to Saturday; 10:30 p.m. Sunday; 11:00 p.m.	17.5	15.9	18.3	11.7	18.5	14.4	15.0	15.9	Outside top 10	
12	March 31, 2025	April 6, 2025	Monday to Saturday; 10:30 p.m. Sunday; 11:00 p.m.	18.5	18.0	11.8	16.8	18.1	16.2	13.4	16.1	Outside top 10	
13	April 7, 2025	April 13, 2025	Monday to Saturday; 10:30 p.m. Sunday; 11:00 p.m.	16.4	16.4	11.1	17.2	17.9	16.7	13.8	15.6	Outside top 10	
14	April 14, 2025	April 20, 2025	Monday to Saturday; 10:30 p.m. Sunday; 11:00 p.m.	17.9	18.6	11.0	18.2	17.5	16.4	13.4	16.1	Outside top 10	
15	April 21, 2025	April 22, 2025	Monday to Saturday; 10:30 p.m. Sunday; 11:00 p.m.	14.7	17.6	—	—	—	—	—	16.1	Outside top 10	

- In 2025, each point represents 270.631 households in 15 market cities in Brazil (77.488 households in São Paulo).
