= Rafael Cardoso =

Brazilian actor (born 1985)

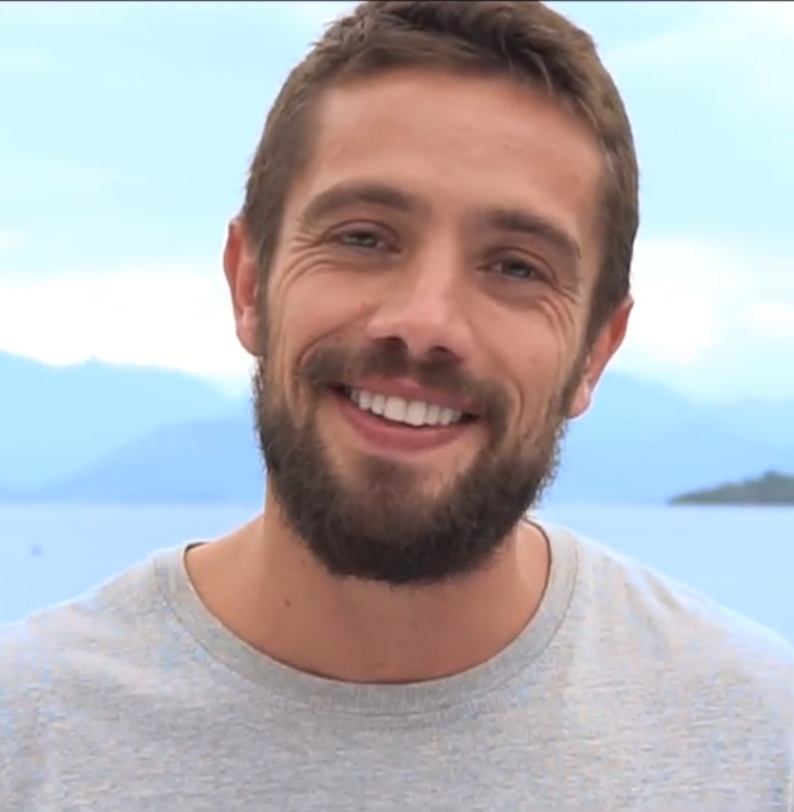
- Cardoso in 2017
- Born: 17 November 1985 (age 40); Porto Alegre, Rio Grande do Sul, Brazil
- Occupation: Actor
- Years active: 2006–present
- Spouse: Mariana Bridi (m. 2013; div. 2022)
- Children: 2

Rafael Cezar Cardoso (born 17 November 1985) is a Brazilian actor.

== Career ==
He began his career in television, playing small parts on specials on RBS TV in Rio Grande do Sul. His first appearance on national television was in 2008, when he played a character in the soap opera Beleza Pura. In November 2009 Cardoso appeared in his first feature film, Do Começo ao Fim, as the character Thomas, younger half-brother of Francisco.

== Filmography ==
=== Television ===
Year	Title	Role	Notes
2006	O Profeta		Participation
2007	Pé na Porta	Rafael	Teen sitcom, 5 episodes
2008	Beleza Pura	Klaus Amarante	
2009	Cinquentinha	Eduardo	
2010	Ti Ti Ti	Jorgito Bianchi	
2011	A Vida da Gente	Rodrigo Macedo	
2012	Lado a Lado	Alberto Camargo Assunção Filho (Albertinho)	
2013	Joia Rara	Viktor Hauser	
2014	Time and the Wind	Florêncio Terra (Jovem)	
2014	Animal	Naldinho	Episode: "Animal Sem Rumo"
2014	Império	Vicente Ferreira	
2015	Além do Tempo	Conde Felipe Castellini / Felipe Santarém	
2016	Sol Nascente	Wladimir César Teixeira (César)	
2016	Segredos de Justiça	Gonçalo	Episode: "Cale-se Para Sempre"
2017-18	O Outro Lado do Paraíso	Renato Loureiro	
2018-19	Espelho da Vida	Danilo Breton / Daniel Marques	
2020	Salve-se Quem Puder	Renzo Machado de Alencar	
2022	Cara e Coragem	Rômulo Dias	Guest star

=== Film ===
Year	Title	Role
2009	From Beginning to End	Thomás
2013	Time and the Wind	Florêncio Terra (Young)
2015	Olhar de Nise	Mário Magalhães
2016	Os Senhores da Guerra	Júlio Bozano
2017	O Rastro	João

=== Internet ===
Year	Title	Role	Note
2011	Quero ser Solteira!	Tomás	Webseries

=== Music video ===
Year	Title	Artist	Note
2012	Vida	Mente Sã	Actor and director of the music video
