= Dom Casmurro =

1899 novel by Machado de Assis

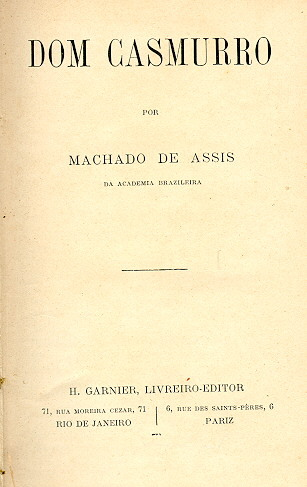
- Title page of the first edition of Dom Casmurro, 1900.
- Author: Machado de Assis
- Language: Portuguese
- Genre: Psychological realism, impressionism
- Published: 1899 (1st Brazilian edition), Livraria Garnier, Rio de Janeiro
- Publication place: Brazil

Dom Casmurro is an 1899 novel written by Brazilian author Joaquim Maria Machado de Assis. Like The Posthumous Memoirs of Brás Cubas and Quincas Borba, both by Machado de Assis, it is widely regarded as a masterpiece of realist literature. It is written as a fictional memoir by a distrusting, jealous husband. The narrator, however, is not a reliable conveyor of the story as it is a dark comedy. Dom Casmurro is considered by critic Afrânio Coutinho "a true Brazilian masterpiece, and perhaps Brazil's greatest representative piece of writing" and "one of the best books ever written in the Portuguese language, if not the best one to date." The author is considered a master of Brazilian literature with a unique style of realism.

Its protagonist is Bento Santiago, the narrator of the story which, told in the first person, aims to "tie together the two ends of life", in other words, to bring together stories from his youth to the days when he is writing the book. Between these two moments, Bento writes about his youthful reminiscences, his life at the seminary, his affair with Capitu and the jealousy that arises from this relationship, which becomes the main plot of the story. Set in Rio de Janeiro during the Second Reign, the novel begins with a recent episode in which the narrator is nicknamed "Dom Casmurro", hence the title of the novel. Machado de Assis wrote it using literary devices such as irony and intertextuality, making references to Schopenhauer and, above all, to Shakespeare's Othello.

Over the years, Dom Casmurro has been the subject of numerous studies, adaptations to other media and interpretations throughout the world, from psychological and psychoanalytical in literary criticism in the 1930s and 1940s, through feminist literary criticism in the 1970s, to sociological in the 1980s and beyond, with its themes of jealousy, Capitu's ambiguity, the moral portrait of the time and the character of the narrator. Credited as a forerunner of Modernism and of ideas later written by the father of psychoanalysis Sigmund Freud, the book influenced writers such as John Barth, Graciliano Ramos and Dalton Trevisan, and is considered by some to be Machado's masterpiece, on a par with The Posthumous Memoirs of Brás Cubas. Dom Casmurro has been translated into several languages and remains one of his most famous books and is considered one of the most fundamental works in all of Brazilian literature.

== Plot ==
The story is told in the first person and the main character is 54-year-old Bento de Albuquerque Santiago, a solitary, well-established lawyer from Rio de Janeiro who, after having rebuilt his childhood house "in the old Rua de Matacavalos" (now Rua do Riachuelo) in Engenho Novo, wants to "tie together the two ends of life and restore his adolescence in old age", in other words, recount his youthful moments in middle age. In the first chapter, the author explains the title: it's a tribute to a "train poet" who once pestered him with his verses and called him "Dom Casmurro" because, according to Bento, he "closed his eyes three or four times" during the recitation. His neighbours, who found his "taciturn, recluse-like habits" strange, and also his close friends, popularised the nickname. He was inspired to write the book by medallions of Caesar, Augustus, Nero and Masinissa: Roman emperors who killed their adulterous wives.

In the following chapters Bento begins his recollections. He recounts the experiences he had when his mother, the widowed D. Glória, sent him to the seminary. Glória sent him to the seminary to fulfil a promise she had made: if she were to conceive a second child after her first, who died in childbirth, she would send it to the seminary. The idea was revived by the dependent José Dias, who tells Uncle Cosme and D. Glória about Bentinho's flirtation with Capitolina, the poor neighbour with whom Bentinho was in love. At the seminary, Bentinho meets his best friend, Ezequiel de Sousa Escobar, the son of a lawyer from Curitiba. Bentinho left the seminary and studied law in São Paulo, while Escobar became a successful businessman and married Sancha, Capitu's friend. In 1865 Capitu and Bentinho get married; Sancha and Ezequiel have a daughter they name Capitolina, while the protagonist and his wife conceive a son named Ezequiel. Bento's companion Escobar, who was an excellent swimmer, paradoxically drowns in 1871, and at the funeral both Sancha and Capitu stare at the deceased: "There was a moment when Capitu's eyes gazed down at the dead man as the widow's had, [...] like the swollen wave of the sea beyond, as if she too wished to swallow up the swimmer of that morning." according to him.

Soon the narrator starts to suspect that his best friend and Capitu were secretly cheating on him. Dom Casmurro also begins to doubt his own paternity. He says in the last lines: "[...] were destined to join together and deceive me..." The book ends with the ironic invitation "Let's go to the History of the Suburbs", a book he would have thought of writing at the beginning of the novel, before the idea of Dom Casmurro occurred to him. The novel takes place from approximately 1857 to 1875, and the narrative, although set in psychological time, allows us to perceive certain units: Bento's childhood in Matacavalos; Dona Glória's house and the Pádua family, with relatives and dependents; his acquaintance with Capitu; the seminary; married life; the intensification of jealousy; the psychotic outbursts of jealousy and aggression; the break-up.

== Characteristics ==
=== Genre ===
After The Posthumous Memoirs of Brás Cubas (1881), Machado de Assis wrote books with different themes and styles from his earlier novels, such as Resurrection and The Hand and the Glove. These new novels – which include, in addition to the Posthumous Memoirs, Quincas Borba (1891) and Dom Casmurro – are labeled as realist because of their critical attitude, objectivity and contemporaneity. Some critics prefer to call this genre "psychological realism", because it presents the interior, the thought, the absence of action combined with psychological and philosophical density. However, there are also romantic residues in Dom Casmurro, such as the erotic metaphor in relation to Capitu, described with "gipsy's eyes, oblique and sly." Ian Watt has stated that realism refers to the empirical experiences of men, but the recreation of the past through Bentinho's memory, his "stains" of recollections, brings the book closer to an impressionist novel.

For John Gledson, Dom Casmurro "is not a realist novel in the sense that it presents us with facts in an open and easily assimilated form. It presents them to us, but we have to read against the narrative to discover and connect them for ourselves. In doing so, we will learn more not only about the characters and the events described in the story, but also about the protagonist, Bento, the narrator himself." We can therefore conclude that Dom Casmurro is a realist novel that focuses on psychological analysis (or exposition) and ironically criticises society, in this case the elite of Rio de Janeiro, through the behaviour of certain characters. Critics have also noted certain elements of modernism in Dom Casmurro. Some, such as Roberto Schwarz, even go so far as to call it "the first Brazilian modernist novel", mainly because of its short chapters, its fragmentary, non-linear structure, its penchant for the allusive, the metalinguistic attitude of those who write and those who see themselves as writers, the interruption of the narrative and the possibility of multiple readings or interpretations; "anti-literary" elements that would only be popularised by modernism decades later.

Others see it as a detective novel, where the reader would have to investigate the details of the actions, distrusting the narrator's point of view to reach a conclusion about the authenticity of the adultery. because "from the beginning there are inconsistencies, obscure steps, disconcerting emphases, which form an enigma." Among these clues are the metaphor of the "eyes like the tide" and the "gipsy's eyes, oblique and sly", the parallel with the Shakespearean drama of Othello and Desdemona, the closeness to the opera of tenor Marcolini (the duet, the trio and the quartet), the "strange resemblances", the relationship with Escobar at the seminary, Capitu's lucidity and Bentinho's obscurantism, the ex-seminarian's delirious and perverse imagination, the biblical precept from Ecclesiastes at the end of the book.

=== Themes ===
The main theme of the novel is jealousy and Bentinho's marital tragedy. From quoting the emperors Caesar, Augustus, Nero and Masinissa, who killed their wives accused of adultery, to quoting Shakespeare's Othello, the Moor who killed his wife for the same reason. His first hint of jealousy appears in chapter 62, when he asks José Dias, a dependent at his mother's house, when the latter goes to visit him at the seminary, "She's gay and happy as ever. What a giddy creature! Just waiting to hook some young buck of the neighbourhood and marry him." For Bentinho, the answer was a shock, as he writes: "[..] and it was accompanied by such a violent beating of my heart that even now I seem to hear it." According to Roberto Schwarz, in Dom Casmurro "the most dramatic instance lies in jealousy, which had been one of the boy's many imaginative outbursts, and now, associated with the authority of being the landowner and husband, it becomes a force for devastation". In Dom Casmurro, however, the theme of jealousy is presented from the point of view of a husband who suspects that he has been betrayed, with no room for the other characters' versions.

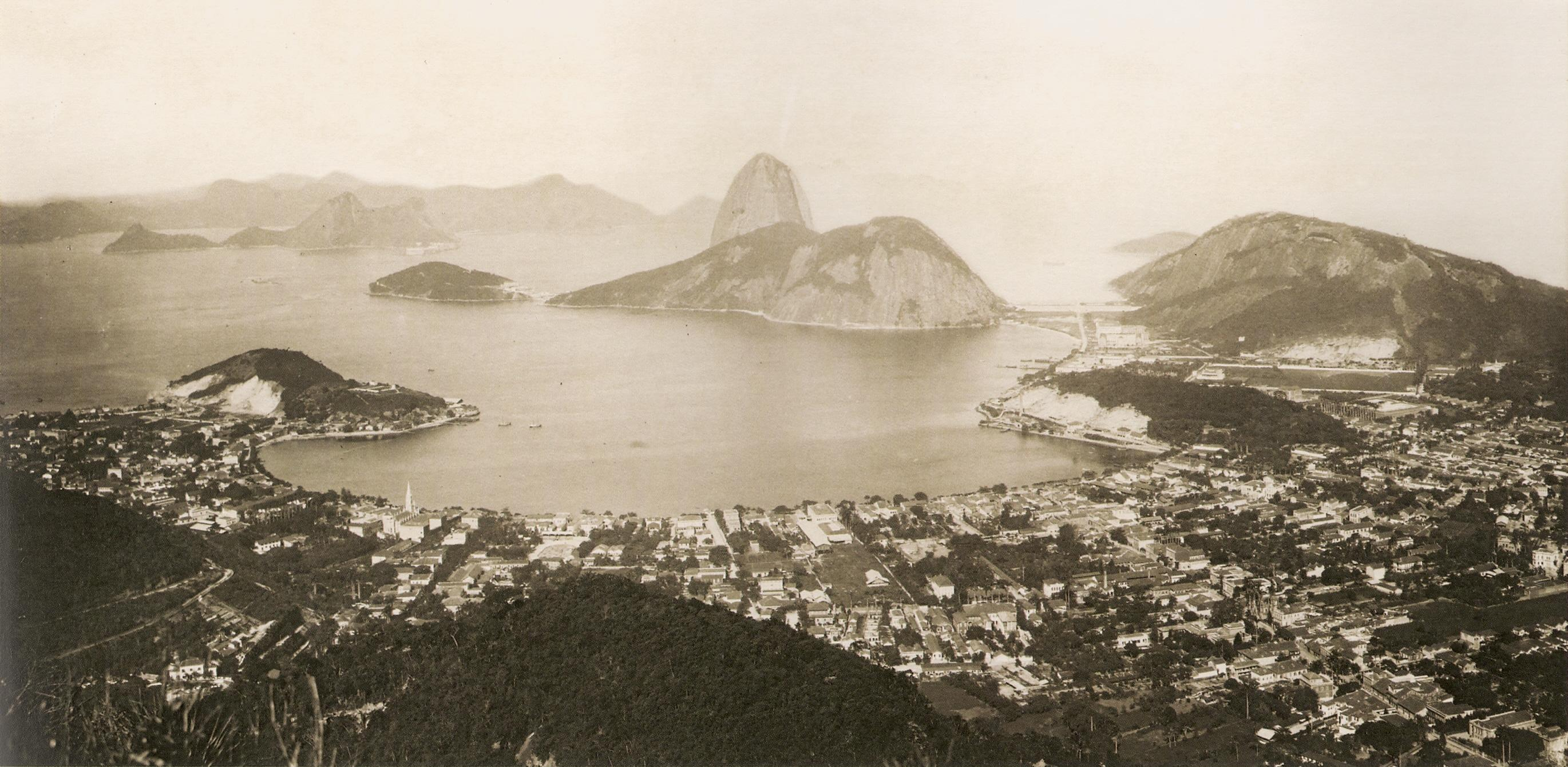
Rio de Janeiro in 1889.

Another very clear theme of the book is its setting – Rio de Janeiro during the Second Reign, in the house of a member of the elite. Critics have written that, at the time of its publication, it was the book that "made the most intense psychological exploration of the character of Rio de Janeiro's society". Bento is a landowner who went to university and became a lawyer, and represents a different class from Capitu, who is intelligent but from a lower-class family. The narrator uses French and English quotations throughout the book, a common practice among 19th-century aristocrats in Brazil. The contrast between the two characters has given rise to interpretations that Bentinho destroyed his wife's persona because he was a member of the elite and she was poor (see Interpretations). In Dom Casmurro, the man is the result of his own duality and is incoherent within himself, while the woman is sly and charming. Thus, it is a book that represents the politics, ideology and religion of the Second Reign.

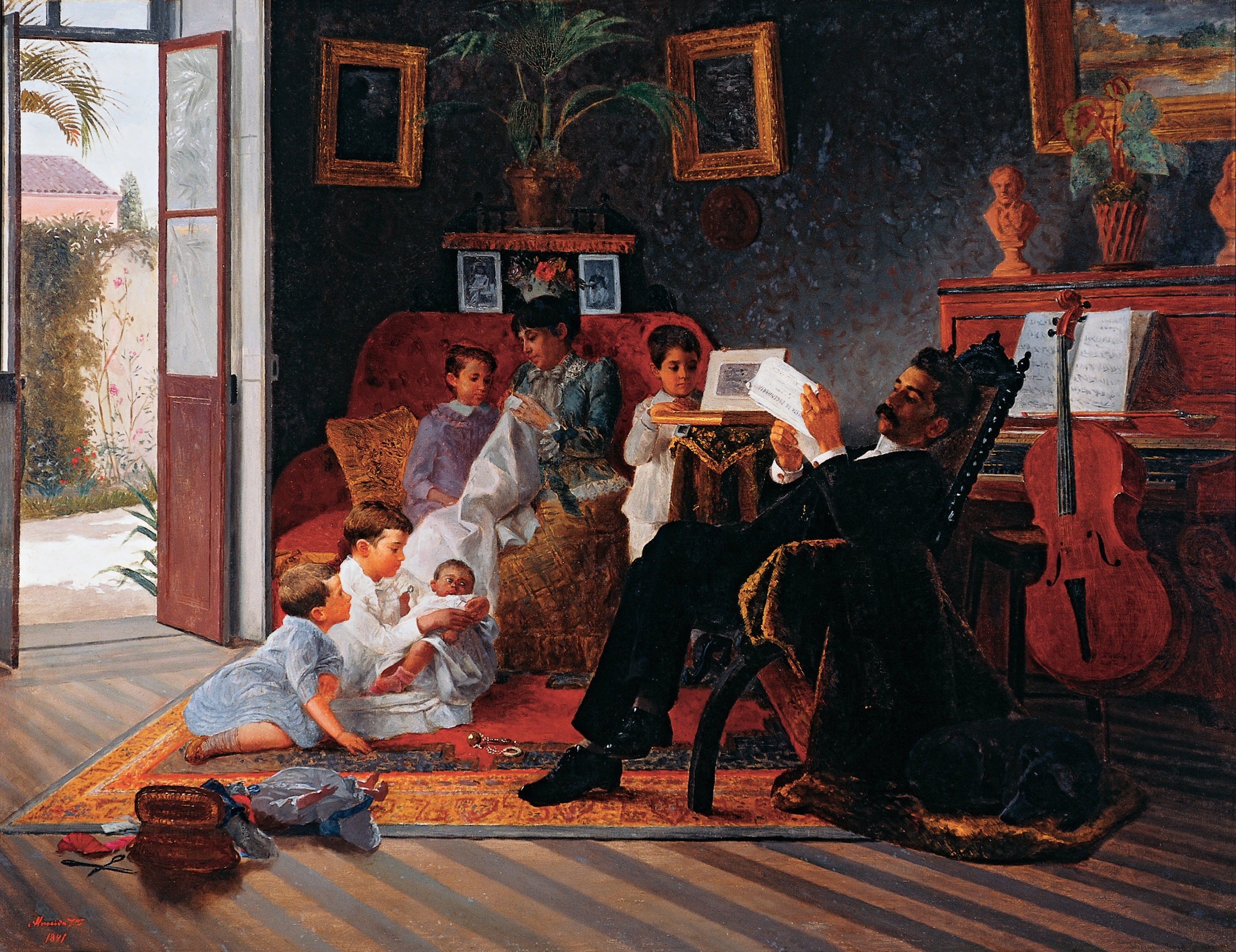
Common carioca family scene from the time of Dom Casmurro, 1891 (Family Scene by Adolpho Augusto Pinto; artist: Almeida Júnior)

According to Eduardo de Assis Duarte, "the universe of the white, noble elite is the setting through which thenarrator character distils his resentment and distrust of the alleged adultery". Schwarz states that the novel represents the social relations and behaviour of the Brazilian elite of the time: progressive and liberal on the one hand, patriarchal and authoritarian on the other. Another point that has been studied is that Dom Casmurro is almost non-communicative with Capitu – hence the fact that only the girl's gestures and glances (and not her words) indicate that she may have cheated on him. Bento is a quiet man who keeps to himself. One of his friends once sent him a letter that said: "I am going to my old place at Petrópolis, Dom Casmurro. See if you can't tear yourself away from the cave in Engenho Novo and come spend a couple of weeks with me." This isolation, which becomes a reason for him to "tie together the two ends of his life", is also one of the themes of the novel. The critic Barreto Filho, for example, noted that it was "the tragic spirit that would shape Machado's entire work, leading destinies towards madness, absurdity and, in the best of cases, solitary old age."

One of the central problems in all of Machado's work, and also in this book, is the question of "to what extent do I exist only through others?", since Bento Santiago becomes Dom Casmurro, influenced by the events and actions of those close to him. Eugênio Gomes observes that the theme of the son's physical resemblance, resulting from the mother's "impregnation" by the characteristics of a beloved man, without the latter having conceived the son (as happens between Capitu, her son Ezequiel and his possible father Escobar), was a hot topic in Dom Casmurro's time. Antonio Candido has also written that one of the main themes of Dom Casmurro is the assumption that an imagined fact is real, an element that is also present in Machado's short stories: the narrator, through himself, would tell the facts through a certain madness that would make his fantasies, expressed in exaggerations and deceptions, come true.

=== Style ===
With Dom Casmurro, Machado maintains the style he had been developing since The Posthumous Memoirs of Brás Cubas. The language is highly cultured, full of references, but informal, in a conversational tone with the reader, almost proto-modernist, filled with intertextuality, metalanguage and irony. It is considered to be the last novel in his "realist trilogy". However, in Dom Casmurro the author also uses features reminiscent of romanticism (or "conventionalism", as some modern critics prefer). Bentinho's relationship with Capitu, his jealousy and possible adultery are examples of this. Moreover, there is always a romantic streak, with Resurrection, where he describes the "graceful bust" of the character Lívia, and in his realist phase, where there is a fixation on Capitu's dubious "gipsy's eyes, oblique and sly". Capitu is able to drive the action, even though the dominance of the Romanesque plot has not diminished.

"The restrained, 'lean', sober style and the short chapters, arranged in harmonious blocks, blend perfectly into the plot's inverted, fragmented setting. Nothing escapes the narrator's reflection, not even his own account, which is also plagued by the demon of analysis, by the "underground man", who relativises any sentimental outpouring with irony and scepticism."
—Fernando Teixeira Andrade.

However, as in the previous novel, in Dom Casmurro there is the same break with the realists who followed Flaubert, whose narrators disappeared behind narrative objectivity, and also with the naturalists who, like Zola, narrated every detail of the plot; the author chooses to abstain from both methods to cultivate fragmentation and to create a narrator who intervenes in the narrative to communicate with the reader, commenting on his own novel with philosophy, intertextuality and metalanguage. An example of this is found in the one-paragraph chapter 133, in which the narrator writes "You must already understand. Now read another chapter". As a lawyer, Bento also makes use of rhetoric to present his version of the facts; his narrative, in psychological time, follows the shifts of his memory in a less random way than in The Posthumous Memoirs of Brás Cubas, but just as fragmentarily. However, some themes are noticeable: his childhood in Matacavalos; Dona Glória's house and the Pádua family, relatives and households; his acquaintance with Capitu; the seminary; married life; the intensification and outbursts of jealousy; the separation, etc.

In fact, the book's style is very close to that of associative impressionism, with a break in the linear narrative, so that the actions do not follow a logical or chronological thread, but are told as they emerge from Bento Santiago's memory and will. José Guilherme Merquior noted that the style of the book "remains in line with the two previous novels, with short chapters, marked by appeals to the reader in a more or less humorous tone and by digressions between seriousness and humour". Digressions are "intrusions" of elements that seem to deviate from the central theme of the book and which Machado uses as interpolations of episodes, memories or thoughts, often quoting other authors or works or commenting on chapters, sentences or the organisation of the whole book itself.

=== Literary influences ===
Out of all Machado's novels Dom Casmurro is probably the work with the most theological influence. There are references to St James and St Peter, mainly because the narrator Bentinho studied at a seminary. In addition, in chapter 17 the author alludes to a pagan oracle from the myth of Achilles and to Jewish beliefs. At the end of the novel, he also uses the biblical precept of Jesus, son of Sirach, as an epigraph: "Be not jealous of thy wife lest she set herself to deceive thee with the malice that she learnt from thee".

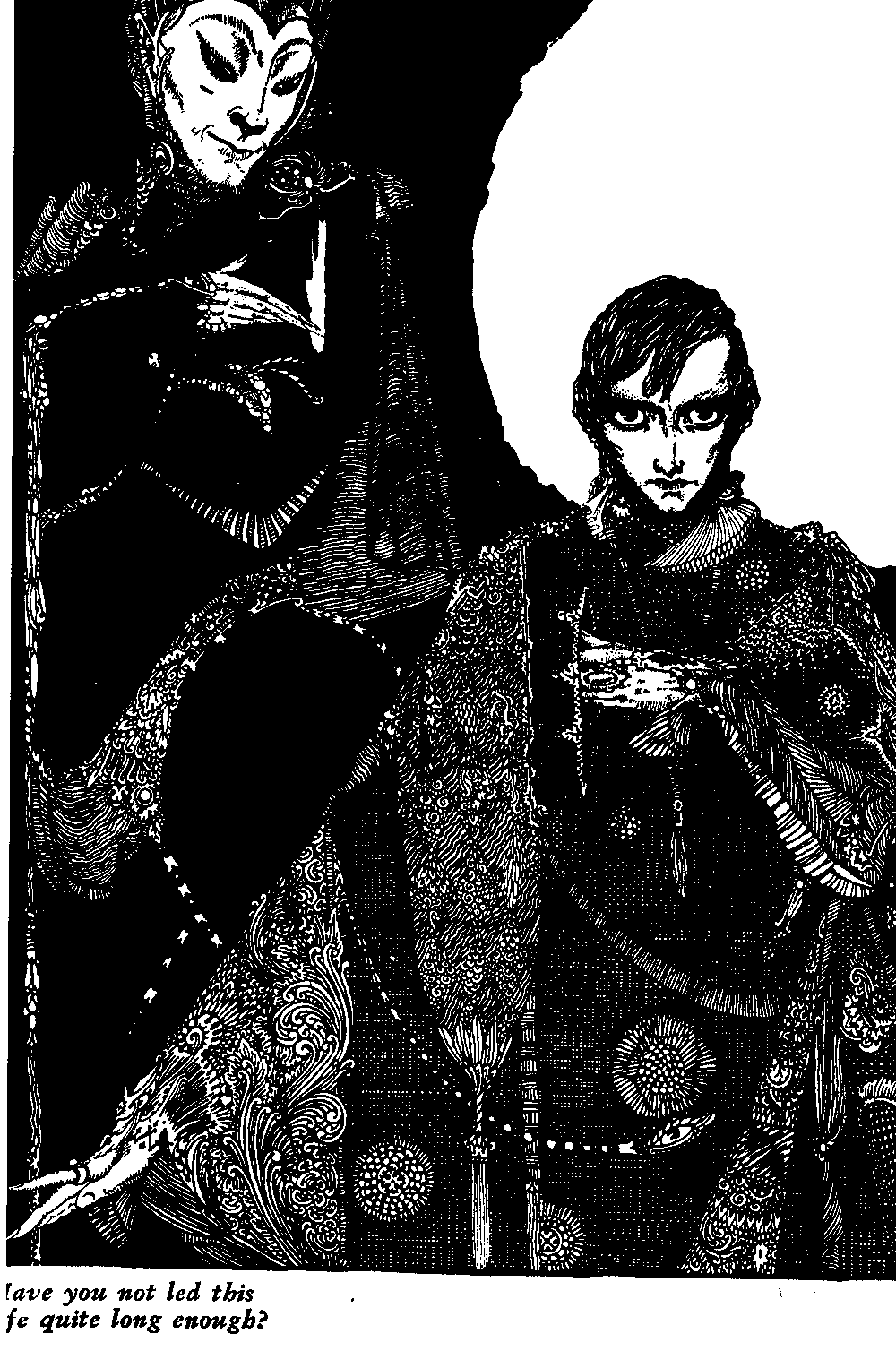
In the book, Bento alludes to Goethe's Faust to evoke his memories. (Illustration: Harry Clarke, 1925).

The theological influence is not limited to the facts, it is also found in the names of the characters: Ezequiel – biblical name; Bento Santiago – Bento (saint), Bentinho (diminutive for saint), Santo + Iago (mix of good and evil, from "saint" and Iago, the evil character in Shakespeare's Othello); Capitu – suggests numerous derivations: from caput, capitis which in Latin means "head", in an allusion to intelligence or cleverness (phonetically, it's similar to capeta (devil), an image of vivacity, or of the malice and treachery with which the jealous narrator infuses it); "Capitolina" is also reminiscent of the verb "capitulate" (to renounce), the resigned attitude of the wife who has been insulted by her husband, and who capitulates and renounces any reaction.

To evoke his memories, Bento quotes Faust, by Johann Wolfgang von Goethe (1749–1832), transcribing: "Ah there, are you come again, restless shades?". Faust is the main character in the play who sells his soul to the demon Mephistopheles so he can be given immortality, eternal youth and wealth. The "restless shades" are, in this case, the memories of people and incidents from the past, dormant but still disturbing. For American critic Helen Caldwell, this quote is the one that sets Bento's memory in motion: "closely followed by the allegory of the 'opera', with its colloquies in heaven between God and Satan, gives the impression that Santiago perhaps identified himself with Faust and felt he had sold his soul to the devil". Critics note that the ancient and modern classics and the biblical quotations are never mere erudition in Machado; on the contrary, they enlighten the narratives and properly inscribe them in the great archetypes of universal literature.

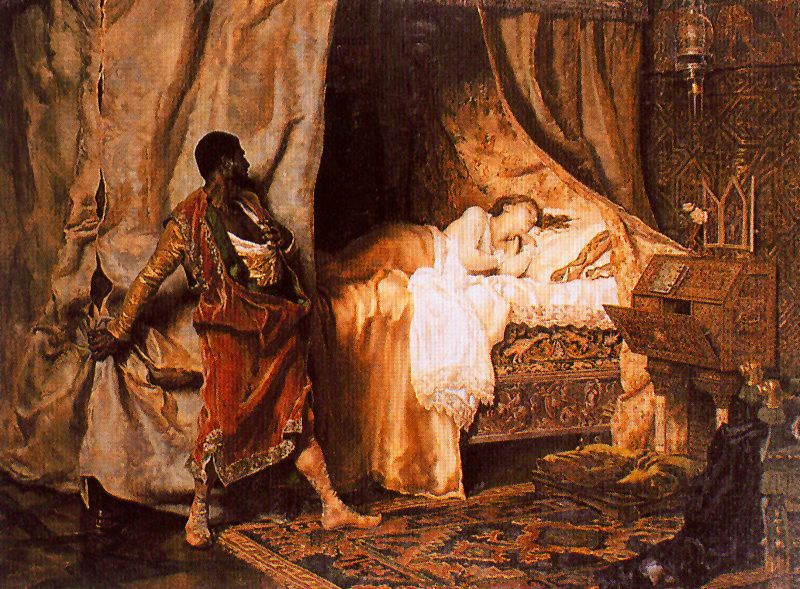
Othello and Desdemona by Muñoz Degrain (1881) is a portrait of Shakespeare's drama Othello: an archetypal influence on the jealousy of Bentinho in Dom Casmurro.

This is also the case with Shakespeare's Othello. Othello is the archetype of jealousy. Bento interacts with the play three times in addition to chapter 62, in chapter 72 and chapter 135: his first remark is on the relationship between Desdemona and her Moorish husband, while in the second mention he watches the play and says that, although he "had never seen or read Othello", he realised the similarity to his own relationship with Capitu when he arrived at the theatre. Helen Caldwell strongly supported the thesis that Dom Casmurro was influenced by Othello not only in the theme of jealousy but also in the characters; for her, Bento is the "Iago of himself" and José Dias (who loved superlatives) a typical Shakespearean character who devotes his energies to counselling (like Hamlet's Polonius, who gives advice to his son and exaggerates the facts when he talks to the king).

Other sources refer to the physical resemblance of the son (in this case, Ezequiel) as a result of the mother being "impregnated" with the features of a beloved man, without the latter having conceived him, a theme already used earlier by Zola in his Madeleine Férat (1868) and also in Goethe's earlier The Elective Affinities (1809), where Eduard and Charlotte's son has the eyes of Ottilie, with whom Eduard is in love, and the features of the captain, loved by Charlotte; Bento's pessimistic philosophy, where critics have noted the direct influence of Schopenhauer, for whom "the pleasure of existence does not rest in living, but is only achieved in contemplating what has been lived" (hence Bento's aim to portray his past), and Pascal, as Bentinho's Christianity is analogous to the Jesuit casuistry attacked by him and the Jansenists.

== Influence and dialogue ==
Dom Casmurro, just as The Posthumous Memoirs of Brás Cubas, has its own style and "anti-literary" elements that would only be popularised by modernism decades later – short chapters, a fragmentary, non-linear structure, a tendency towards the allusive, a metalinguistic stance of the writer and of those who see themselves as writers, interferences in the narrative and the possibility of multiple readings and interpretations.

Oswald de Andrade, a leading figure in the important 1922 Modern Art Week, whose literary style, similar to Mário de Andrade's, was part of the experimental, metalinguistic and city-based tradition that was somewhat comparable to the work of Machado de Assis and had Dom Casmurro as one of his favourite books and saw the writer as a master of the Brazilian novel. The book's most direct influence, however, is foreign; John Barth wrote The Floating Opera (1956) which, in David Morrell's comparison, has similar traits to the plot of Dom Casmurro, such as the fact that the main characters in both books are lawyers, even consider suicide and compare life to an opera, and live in a love triangle. In fact, all of Barth's early works were strongly influenced by Machado de Assis's book, especially his technique for writing the novel and the plot of Dom Casmurro. Dom Casmurro is also linked to The Devil to Pay in the Backlands (1956), in which Guimarães Rosa takes up the "journey of memory" found in Machado's book.

Bentinho's challenge to attract and win Capitu over to achieve his goal of being interested in his girlfriend's gifts – an attitude identified as a "lordly and possessive model that dispenses with greater subtleties" – indirectly influenced Graciliano Ramos when he wrote one of his most famous modernist novels of the 20th century, São Bernardo (1934), portraying Paulo Honório's direct action in capturing Madalena. Dom Casmurro also influenced, only this time explicitly, Dalton Trevisan's short story "Capitu Sou Eu", published in a book of short stories of the same name in 2003, in which a teacher and a rebellious student have a sordid affair and discuss the personality of the character.

Modern critics also attribute to Dom Casmurro ideas and concepts that would later be developed by Sigmund Freud and his psychoanalysis projects. Machado's book was published in the same year as Freud's The Interpretation of Dreams, and Dom Casmurro had already written sentences such as "I think that I learned the taste of her felicity in the milk with which she gave me suck", an allusion to what Freud later called the oral phase in psychoanalysis, in relation to the mouth–breast, in what some call a "Freudian premonition". The boy Bentinho was introspective and his daydreams replaced part of reality: "Daydreams are like other dreams, they weave themselves on the pattern of our inclinations and memories" wrote Dom Casmurro when he was older, in an anticipation of the Freudian concept of the unity of psychological life in dreams and waking life.

The subsequent adaptations of Dom Casmurro, in countless media and forms, also prove the dialogue and influence that the novel still has in many different areas, whether in cinema, theatre, popular and classical music, television, comics, literature itself, etc.

== Critic ==
=== Introduction ===
"Dom Casmurro is a work open to so many interpretations, some of which have already been made and published, especially in the last fifty years, and many others which are undoubtedly yet to be made. I don't think any Brazilian novel has been reinterpreted in such a comprehensive way."
—David Haberly

In short, one could say that criticism of Dom Casmurro is relatively recent. It was endorsed by Machado's contemporaries and the criticism that followed his death tried to analyse the character Bento and his psychological situation. Dom Casmurro has also been analysed in studies of sexuality and the human psyche, and existentialism, so that in recent times Machado's work has been commonly attributed an open range of interpretations.

However, the first study that reinvigorated the role of the novel, written by Helen Caldwell in the 1960s, didn't make an impact in Brazil. It was only recently, through Silviano Santiago in 1969 and especially Roberto Schwarz in 1991, that Caldwell's book was discovered and opened up new possibilities for Machado's work. This was also the decade when Machado de Assis received the most critical attention in France, and the novel received important commentary from French translators; Dom Casmurro's book was of interest mainly to literary journals of psychology and psychiatry, which also recommended reading L'Aliéniste, "The Psychiatrist", to their readers.

Modern critics, strongly influenced by the history of interpretations of the novel, which will be discussed below, identify three successive readings of Dom Casmurro, namely:

1. Romanesque, it's the story of the rise and fall of a love, from the idyll of youth, through marriage, to the death of a partner and a questionable child.
2. Close to the psychoanalytic and detective novel, it is the accusatory libel of the husband-lawyer, who looks for signs and proofs of adultery, which he takes as undeniable.
3. It must be carried out against the current, by reversing the course of suspicion, turning the narrator into the defendant and the accuser into the accused.

The history of interpretations in the next section, focusing on criticism from the 1930s and 40s to the 1980s, shows the turn that has been taken in the different interpretations of Dom Casmurro, supported not only by Brazilian critics, but also, and considerably, by international ones. The majority of interpretations of the novel are influenced by sociology, feminism and psychoanalysis, and most also refer to the theme of the narrator's jealousy, Dom Casmurro; some arguing that there was no adultery and others that the author left the question open to the reader.

=== Interpretations ===
Among the themes interpreted over the years by critics and essayists were Capitu's possible adultery, a socio-psychological analysis of the characters and the character of the narrator-character. Critics in the 1930s and 40s wrote that Bento Santiago suffered from dysthymia and linked his quiet and solitary personality to the author himself, who supposedly suffered from epilepsy. His friend Escobar is said to suffer from obsessive-compulsive disorder and motor tics, with possible control over them. These considerations played some of a psychologism role regarding Dom Casmurro and Machado de Assis. Modern critics see this interpretation as the fruit of the psychologism of the time, which exaggerated his sufferings and gave no importance to his career rise (as a journalist and public employee). Psychiatrists such as José Leme Lopes noted Bentinho's developmental inhibitions and his "delay in affective development and neurosis". The Bentinho that Dom Casmurro evokes would have "late sexuality" and "a predominance of fantasy over reality, with anguish".

According to the psychiatric interpretation, this is one of the reasons for his insane jealousy. Psychoanalytic critics believe that Bento was "born without the power to have his own desires". The character was born to "take the place of a stillborn brother", to which psychoanalyst Arminda Aberastury writes that "he always drew attention to the difficulties that children who are predestined, who come in place of another, will have in their psychological development". Dom Casmurro was a boy who obeyed his mother's every wish: he entered the seminary, became a priest, and so some see him as an insecure and spoiled man. Bentinho is seen as a typical 19th century Brazilian man from Rio's high society, with no historical perspective (hence his desire to write History of the Surburbs but then choosing to first recount the memories of his youth), pessimistic and elusive. Others, such as Millôr Fernandes, also believe that Bentinho had a tendency towards homosexuality and that he was somewhat fond of Escobar.

Over the years, Dom Casmurro has been perceived from two main points of view: one, the oldest, of trusting the words written by Bento Santiago, without further questioning (José Veríssimo, Lúcia Miguel Pereira, Afrânio Coutinho, Érico Veríssimo and especially Machado's contemporaries are part of this group); and the other, latest, that Machado de Assis leaves it up to the reader to come to their own conclusions about the characters and the plot, which is one of the most frequent characteristics of his literature. Advocates of this approach often shy away from the issues of the novel and see Dom Casmurro as an open-ended work.

"The conclusion to which Santiago gradually leads the reader is that the deceit perpetraded against him by his dearly loved wife and dearly loved friend wrought upon him and changed him from the kind, loving, ingenuous Bento into the hard, cruel and cynical Dom Casmurro."
—Helen Caldwell, one of the key authors in changing the common interpretation and judging the narrator instead of Capitu.

The interpretative criticism negatively directed at the narrator and Capitu's salvation, arguing that she didn't betray him, has only recently been made, since the feminist movement of the 1960s and 1970s and above all by the American essayist Helen Caldwell. In The Brazilian Othello of Machado de Assis (1960), she argues that the character Capitu did not betray Bentinho, thus changing the prevailing perception of the novel, and that she is the victim of a cynical Dom Casmurro who actually misleads the reader with words that are not true. Caldwell's main evidence is the author's clear and frequent intertextuality with Shakespeare's Othello, whose protagonist kills his wife mistakenly thinking that she has betrayed him. The author writes her thesis from the main perspective that Machado's narrator is autonomous enough to give his own unique version of the facts. For the critic, Bentinho doesn't do it on purpose, but out of madness, since he is, in her words, the "Iago of himself". Caldwell also revalidated the role of Capitu, who was supposed to be prettier and have better dreams than her husband. Other foreign critics, such as John Gledson, from the 1980s onwards hypothesised social interests related to the organisation and crisis of the patriarchal order during the Second Reign. For Dona Glória's carrion, mouldy and repressed universe, with its widowers, servants and slaves, the energy and freedom of opinion of the modern, poor girl, daring and irreverent, lucid and active, would become intolerable. One of the evidences of Gledson's argument can be found in chapter 3, which he considers to be the "foundation of the novel", in José Dias' motivation when talking about Capitu's family and reminding Mrs Glória of the promise she made to put Bentinho in the seminary, in other words, treating the "Pádua people" as inferior and their daughter as a dissimulated and poor girl who could corrupt the boy.

Thus, the jealousy of Bentinho, a rich boy from a decaying family, of the typical bachelor of the Second Reign, would condense a broad social problem behind this "new Othello who slanders and destroys his beloved". This sociological interpretation is still preserved today, as we read in the words of the Portuguese essayist Hélder Macedo who made a statement regarding the theme of jealousy:

"In the destruction of Capitu, in the neutralisation of the challenge to the alternative way of being that she represents, lies the fundamental purpose of the restoration sought by Bento Santiago through the writing of his memoir. [...] She was a stranger, an intruder, a threat to the status quo, an undesirable trace of union with a lower social class, thus also implicitly representing the potential emergence of a new political order that threatened the established power. [...] Class and gender are thus fused in the same threat represented by Capitu's supposedly dubious morality."

From this perspective, the narrator, a stereotypical tool used by the author to criticise a certain social class of his time, is able to use the prejudices of Brazilians to induce them in his argument against Capitu. These prejudices include the physical resemblance and mannerisms that a son inherits from his real father, a prejudice that would be common to Brazilian culture, and which Bento uses when talking about how Ezequiel was like Escobar.

Aware of the discomfort that the critical debate on the theme of jealousy has caused since then, authors such as José Aderaldo Castello have claimed that Dom Casmurro is not a novel about jealousy, but about doubt: "it is par excellence the novel that expresses the atrocious and insoluble conflict between subjective truth and insinuations of high infiltration power, generated by coincidences, appearances and misunderstandings, immediately or belatedly fuelled by intuitions". The previously mentioned hypotheses that Bento Santiago was really telling the truth and that Capitu had cheated on him and that Machado wanted to leave the truth up to the reader are not disregarded.

The writer Lygia Fagundes Telles, who studied the novel to write the screenplay for the film Capitu (1968), said in a recent interview that she was the reader who judged Capitu and then Bentinho: "I don't know anymore. My last version is this one, I don't know. I think I've finally stopped judging. In the beginning she was a saint, in the second she was a monster. Now, in my old age, I don't know. I think Dom Casmurro is more important than Madame Bovary. In Dom Casmurro there is doubt, whereas Bovary has it written on her forehead that she's an adulteress".

== Reception ==
"Dom Casmurro came out in 1900. Machado died in 1908. No critic in those eight years ever dared to deny Capitu's adultery."
—Otto Lara Resende

At the time of its publication, Dom Casmurro was praised by the author's close friends. Medeiros e Albuquerque, for example, said it was "our Othello". His friend Graça Aranha commented on Capitu: "While married, she had her husband's closest friend for a lover". The first critics seem to have believed the narrator's words, comparing the book to Eça de Queiroz's Cousin Bazilio (1878) and Flaubert's Madame Bovary, novels about adultery.

José Veríssimo wrote that "Dom Casmurro is about an undoubtedly intelligent man, but a simple one, who from an early age let himself be deceived by the girl he had loved as a child, who had bewitched him with her calculated cheekiness, with her deep innate science of dissimulation, to whom he had given himself with all the fervour compatible with his quiet temperament". Veríssimo also drew an analogy between Dom Casmurro and the narrator of The Posthumous Memoirs of Brás Cubas: "Dom Casmurro is the twin brother, albeit with great differences in features if not in character, of Brás Cubas".

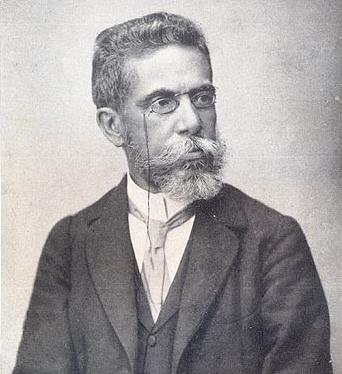
Machado de Assis, c. 1896.

Silvio Romero had not accepted Machado's break with narrative linearity and the nature of the traditional plot for some time, and he belittled his prose. As we know, however, Livraria Garnier published Machado's volumes both in Brazil and in Paris, and with the new book, international critics were already questioning whether Eça de Queiroz was still the best Portuguese language novelist. Artur de Azevedo praised the work twice, in one of which he wrote: "Dom Casmurro is one of those books that is impossible to summarise, because it is in the inner life of Bento Santiago that all its charm, all its strength lies", and concluded that "What is everything, however, in this dark and sad book, where there are pages written with tears and blood, is the fine psychology of the two main characters and the noble and superb style of the narrative".

Machado de Assis sent letters to his friends expressing his satisfaction with the comments published about his book. Dom Casmurro has received countless other criticisms and interpretations over the years; it is now considered one of the greatest contributions to the impressionist novel and is considered by some to be one of the greatest exponents of Brazilian realism.

== Publications ==
=== Editions ===
Published by Livraria Garnier in 1900, although the imprint on the title page shows the previous year, Dom Casmurro was written to be published directly as a book, unlike The Posthumous Memoirs of Brás Cubas (1881) and Quincas Borba (1891), which were published as pamphlets prior to publication in book format. Quincas Borba appeared in chapters in the magazine A Estação from 1886 to 1891 before finally being published in 1892, and The Posthumous Memoirs of Brás Cubas was in Revista Brasileira from March to December 1880 until it was published by Tipografia Nacional in 1881.

Garnier, which published Machado's works both in Brazil and in Paris (under the name Hippolyte Garnier), received a letter in French from the author on 19 December 1899, complaining about the delay in publication: "We expect Dom Casmurro on the date you announced. I ask you, with all our interests, that the first batch of copies be large enough, because it could run out quickly, and the delay of the second batch will affect sales", to which the publisher replied on 12 January 1900: "Dom Casmurro did not leave this week, it is a delay of one month due to causes beyond our control [...]".

The first edition was limited, but the novel was kept in stock to be reprinted as soon as the initial 2,000 copies were sold out.

=== In other languages ===
Since its first publication in Portuguese, the novel has been translated into many other languages. Below are some of the most significant translations:

Year	Language	Title	Translator(s)	Publisher
1930 1954 1958	Italian	Dom Casmurro	Giuseppe Alpi Liliana Borla Laura Marchiori	Rome: Instituto Cristoforo Colonbo Milan: Fratelli Bocca Milan: Rizzoli
1936 1956 2002	French	Dom Casmurro Dom Casmurro Dom Casmurro et les Yeux de ressac	Francis de Miomandre Francis de Miomandre Anne-Marie Quint	Paris: Institut international de Coopération intellectuelle Paris: Métailié Paris: Albin Michel
1943 1954 1995	Spanish	Don Casmurro Don Casmurro Don Casmurro	Luís M. Baudizzone e Newton Freitas J.Natalicio Gonzalez Ramón de Garciasol	Buenos Aires: Editorial Nova Buenos Aires: W.M.Jackson Buenos Aires: Espasa-Calpe
1951 1980 2005	German	Dom Casmurro	E. G. Meyenburg Harry Kaufmann Harry Kaufmann	Zurich: Manesse Verlag Berlin: Rütten & Loening Augsburg: Weltbild
1953 1953 1992 1997	English	Dom Casmurro	Helen Caldwell Helen Caldwell Scott Buccleuch John Gledson	London: W.H.Allen New York City: The Nooday Press England: Penguin Classics New York City/Oxford: Oxford University Press
1954	Swedish	Dom Casmurro	Göran Heden	Stockholm: Sven-Erik berghs Bokförlag
1959	Polish	Dom Casmurro	Janina Wrzoskowa	Warsaw: Panstwowy Wydawnicz
1960	Czech	Don Morous	Eugen Spálený	Prague: SNKLHU
1961	Russian	Дон Касмурро	Т. Ивановой	Moscow: Рыбинский Дом печати (new edition 2015)
1965	Romanian	Dom Casmurro	Paul Teodorescu	Bucharest: Univers
1965	Serbo-Croatian	Dom Casmurro	Ante Gettineo	Zagreb: Zora
1973	Estonian	Dom Casmurro	Aita Kurfeldt	Tallinn: Eesti Raamat
1985 1984	Portuguese	Dom Casmurro	–	Lisbon: Inquérito Porto: Lello & Irmão
1985	Dutch	Dom Casmurro	August Willemsen	Amsterdam: De Arbeiderspers
1998	Catalan	El Senyor Casmurro	Xavier Pàmies	Barcelona: Quaderns Crema

== Adaptations ==
=== Cinema ===
The two film adaptations of the novel are different. The first, Capitu (1968), directed by Paulo César Saraceni, with a screenplay by Paulo Emílio Sales Gomes and Lygia Fagundes Telles, and performances by Isabella, Othon Bastos and Raul Cortez, is a faithful reading of the book, while the latest, Dom (2003), directed by Moacyr Góes, with Marcos Palmeira and Maria Fernanda Cândido, shows a contemporary approach to jealousy in relationships.

=== Theatre ===
The novel also received relevant theatre adaptations, such as the play Capitu (1999), directed by Marcus Vinícius Faustini, awarded and praised by the Brazilian Academy of Letters, and Criador e Criatura: o Encontro de Machado e Capitu (2002), a free adaptation by Flávio Aguiar and Ariclê Perez, directed by Bibi Ferreira. Before these two productions, Dom Casmurro was adapted into an opera, with a libretto by Orlando Codá and music by Ronaldo Miranda, which premiered at the Theatro Municipal de São Paulo in 1992.

=== Music ===
Luiz Tatit composed "Capitu", a song performed by singer Ná Ozzetti. Composer Ronaldo Miranda wrote an opera with a libretto by Orlando Codá, which premiered in May 1992 at the Theatro Municipal de São Paulo.

=== Literature ===
In 1998, Fernando Sabino published the novel Amor de Capitu. In this version, the narrative was rewritten in third person.

=== Television ===
In 2008, to celebrate 100 years since the death of Machado de Assis, Rede Globo produced a micro-series called Capitu, directed by Luiz Fernando Carvalho, written by Euclydes Marinho, starring Eliane Giardini, Maria Fernanda Cândido and Michel Melamed; combining period elements such as costumes with modern elements ranging from the soundtrack, with songs by the band Beirut, to scenes in which MP3s were shown.

=== Comic books ===
A comic book adaptation was made in 2012 by Mario Cau and Felipe Greco. This comic won the 2013 Prêmio Jabuti (the most traditional Brazilian literary award) in "best illustration" and "best school related book" categories, and the HQ Mix Trophy in 2014 (in the "Comic book adaptation" category).

Other comic book adaptations of Dom Casmurro have also been published by Ática (authors: Ivan Jaf and Rodrigo Rosa) and Nemo (authors: Wellington Srbek and José Aguiar).

== Sources ==
- de Assis, Machado (1953). Dom Casmurro. Translated by Caldwell, Helen. London: W. H. Allen.
- Salomon, Geanneti Tavares (2021). Fashion and Irony in Dom Casmurro. New York: Peter Lang. ISBN 978-1789979725.
