= Brazilianist =

Brazilianist (brasilianista, in Brazilian Portuguese) is a scholar who teaches, conducts research, and publishes about Brazil. Common fields and disciplines are history, anthropology, sociology, political science, geography, literature, and music. There is great diversity of interests amongst Brazilianists.

== Origins and use of the term ==
The term "Brazilianist" supposedly originated in Brazil in the 1960s or perhaps a little earlier; it was coined to designate scholars from the United States who were receiving grants to study Brazil at the time when the U.S. had special political interests in that country. However, that is a view perhaps a little too narrow as to the motivating factors which led these many social scientists to do research on Brazilian issues.

In the 1970s and well into the 1980s the Brazilian press paid considerable attention to Brazilianists themselves but there was not much discussion of their arguments and findings. At that time the term "Brazilianist" could even have something of a pejorative tone.

Since the 1990s there has been a greater acknowledgment in Brazil of the body of work produced by Brazilianist scholars. Brazilianists' studies began to be more actively introduced into curricula at major Brazilian universities.. A major bi-national conference in Washington D.C. led to the book Envisioning Brazil: A Guide to Brazilian Studies in the United States. University of Wisconsin Press, 2005. Edited by Marshall C. Eakin and Paulo Roberto de Almeida. The book was translated as O Brasil dos Brasilianistas: um guia dos estudos sobre o Brasil nos Estados Unidos, 1945-2000.

Today some of the books produced by Brazilianists are known well beyond academic circles in Brazil.

Brazilian and Portuguese dictionaries define a “Brazilianist” as a scholar, most usually a non-Brazilian, dedicated to Brazilian studies.

== List of notable Brazilianists ==
The following is a partial list of people who have studied Brazil in a multi-disciplinary fashion and can be considered Brazilianists.

- Roger Bastide
- Bertha Becker
- Benjamin Moser
- Leslie Bethell
- Jean Blondel
- Charles Boxer
- Helen Caldwell
- Robert Carneiro
- Ronald H. Chilcote
- Shelton H. Davis
- Carl N. Degler
- Christopher Dunn
- Peter B. Evans
- Philip Fearnside
- Albert Fishlow
- Earl E. Fitz
- Richard Graham
- James N. Green
- John Hemming
- Randal Johnson
- Herbert S. Klein
- Jacques Lambert
- Ruth Landes
- Anthony Leeds
- Jeffrey Lesser
- Robert Levine
- Claude Lévi-Strauss
- Thomas Lovejoy
- Frederick C. Luebke
- Kenneth Maxwell
- David Maybury-Lewis
- Frank McCann
- Peter J. McDonough
- Betty Jane Meggers
- Alfred Metraux
- Pierre Monbeig
- Charles A. Perrone
- Paul Rivet
- Antonius Robben
- Riordan Roett
- Anthony John R. Russell-Wood
- Wilhelm Schmidt
- Philippe C. Schmitter
- Ronald Schneider
- Stuart B. Schwartz
- Thomas Skidmore
- Stanley J. Stein
- Alfred Stepan
- Georg Thomas
- Thomas J. Trebat
- Maxine Margolis
- Pierre Fatumbi Verger
- Charles Wagley
- Paul Wellman
- John Wirth
- Jean Ziegler
- Christian Feest
- Johann Natterer
- Patricia Moura GalliTimothy Power
- Anthony Pereira
