= Revista Brasileira =

Publication of the Brazilian Academy of Letters

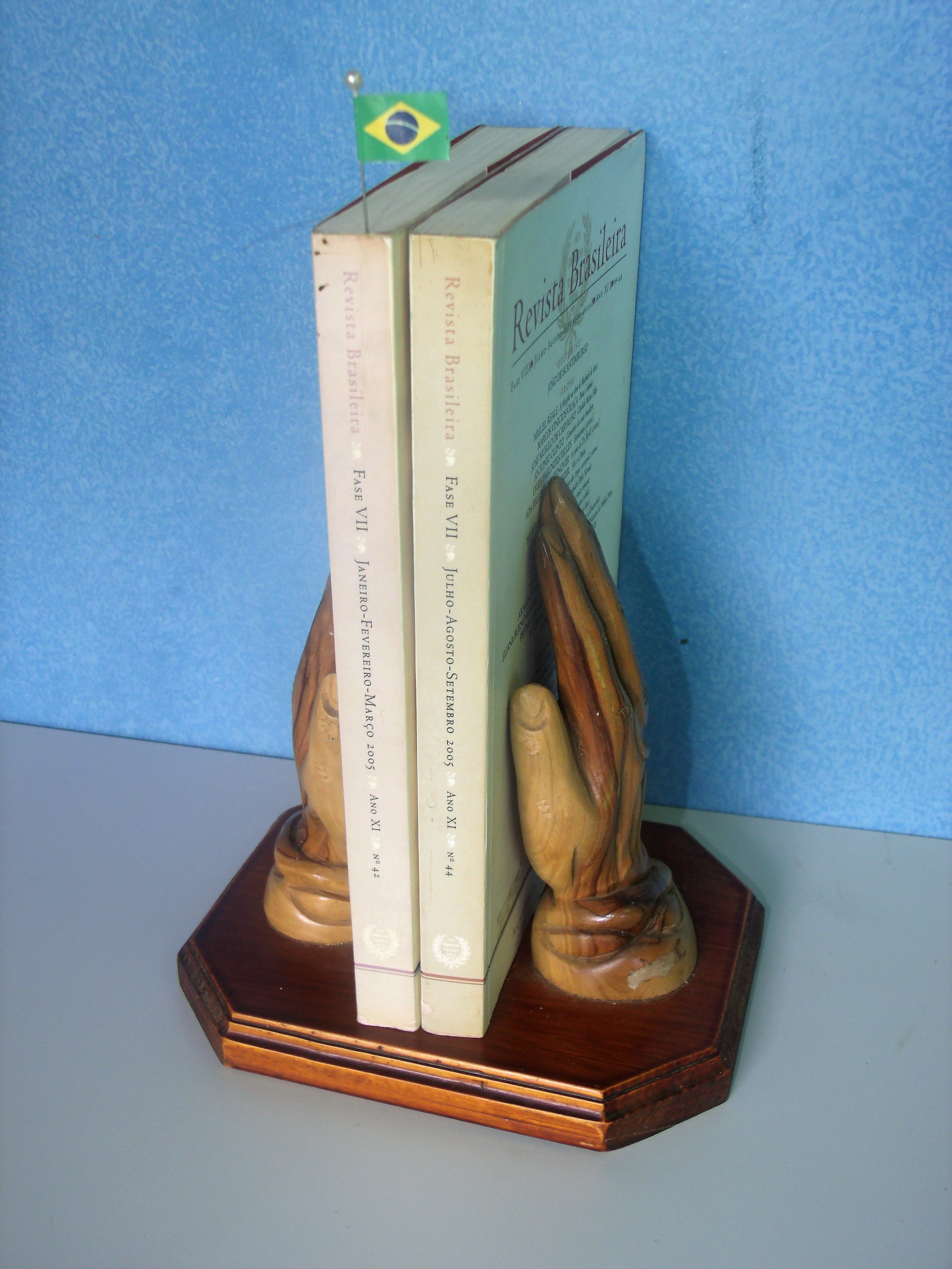
- Two 2005 issues of Revista Brasileira
- Language: Portuguese
- Edited by: Cícero Sandroni

Publication details
- Former names: Revista Brasileira, Jornal de Literatura, Teatros e Indústria; Revista Brasileira, Jornal de Ciências, Letras e Artes
- History: 1855–present
- Publisher: Brazilian Academy of Letters (Brazil)
- Frequency: Quarterly
- Open access: Yes

Standard abbreviations
- ISO 4: Rev. Bras.

Links
- Journal homepage

Revista Brasileira (lit. 'Brazilian Review' or 'Brazilian Magazine') is a publication of the Brazilian Academy of Letters. Its history began on 14 July 1855 and can be divided into nine phases as per Afrânio Peixoto. Throughout its existence, Revista Brasileira has been responsible for publishing various works, such as The Posthumous Memoirs of Brás Cubas. During its third phase, it became an intellectual mecca in the capital of Brazil, with international ramifications.

== History and phases ==
The first publication to use the name "Revista Brasileira" came to light on 14 July 1855, with the title "Revista Brasileira, Jornal de Literatura, Teatros e Indústria". It was founded by Francisco de Paula Meneses. Although it announced itself as a biweekly publication, it had only one edition. The second edition only appeared in 1857, under the name "Revista Brasileira, Jornal de Ciências, Letras e Artes", and had a total of four volumes. It lasted until 1861, and its director was Cândido Batista de Oliveira. Afrânio Peixoto ignored Meneses's edition and considered only the volumes published by Batista de Oliveira as phase I.

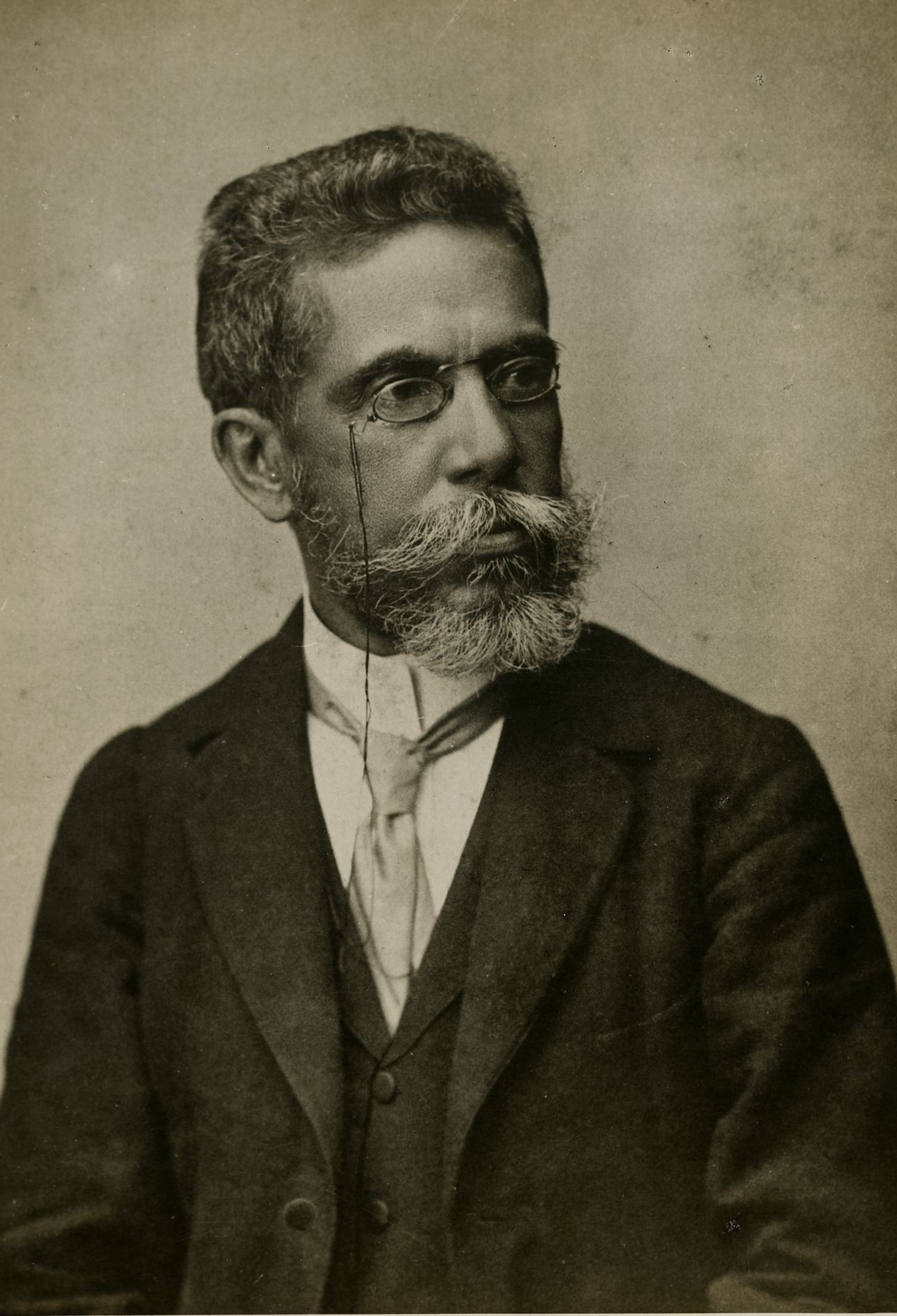
Machado de Assis, the author of The Posthumous Memoirs of Brás Cubas

Phase II was edited by Nicolau Midosi and is therefore also known as the "Midosi phase". It was published monthly from June 1879 to December 1881. A total of 30 issues were compiled into 10 volumes. It was during this phase that Revista Brasileira published the work The Posthumous Memoirs of Brás Cubas by Machado de Assis.

Phase III circulated from January 1895 to September 1899. Nineteen volumes with 93 fascicles were published during this period. It was directed by José Veríssimo and is therefore also called the "José Veríssimo phase". Veríssimo requested that contributions be sent to the Ouvidor Street, the address where the writers who founded the Brazilian Academy of Letters used to gather. Phase IV, directed by Antônio Batista Pereira, lasted from June 1934 to November 1935, publishing only 10 issues.

Starting with phase V, Revista Brasileira began to be published by the Brazilian Academy of Letters. It was initiated in July 1941 as a result of a proposal by Levi Carneiro. In 1948, the 20th issue was published, and, after a 10-year interruption, it resumed circulation in 1958. It reached the 29th issue, published in November 1966.

Phase VI, directed by Josué Montello, comprised six volumes from 1975 to 1980. Phase VII, directed by João de Scantimburgo, included 69 issues, being quarterly and circulating from the last quarter of 1994 until December 2011. Phase VIII began in the first quarter of 2012, under the direction of Marco Lucchesi. Phase IX, under the direction of Cícero Sandroni, started in 2018.

== Collection ==
A complete collection is housed in the Archive-Museum of Brazilian Literature at the Casa de Rui Barbosa Foundation, which also organized and published an index of the first six phases. A microfilmed collection is available at the National Library of Brazil.
