= O alienista =

"The Psychiatrist"
- Short story by Machado de Assis
- Original title: O alienista
- Translator: William L. Grossman
- Country: Brazil
- Language: Portuguese
- Genre(s): Novella, satire

Publication
- Published in: Papéis avulsos
- Publication type: Anthology
- Media type: Print
- Publication date: (1881–)1882
- Published in English: 1963
- Pages: 86

"O alienista" (translated as "The Psychiatrist" then "The Alienist") is a satiric novella written by the Brazilian author Machado de Assis (1839–1908). The story ran in Rio de Janeiro's newspaper A Estação (from 15 October 1881 to 15 March 1882), then was published in 1882 as part of the author's short-story collection Papéis avulsos ("Single Papers"). An English translation was published in 1963.

In 1970, the story was adapted into the comedy film The Alienist. In 2007, it was adapted into a same-titled graphic novella by Fábio Moon and Gabriel Bá (and won the 2008 Prêmio Jabuti for educational material).

== Plot summary ==
Published a year after Machado's first major novel, Memórias Póstumas de Brás Cubas, "The Psychiatrist" follows the scientific efforts of Dr. Simon Bacamarte (Simão Bacamarte in the original – "bacarmarte" being Portuguese for "blunderbuss", an old scattershot gun). Bacamarte, a Brazil-born Portuguese (when Brazil was a colony), is a prominent physician whose sincere obsession for discovering a universal method to cure pathological disorders drives inhabitants of the small Brazilian town of Itaguaí to fear, conspiracy, and revolutionary attempts.

Chapters 1–4

In a short space of time, Bacamarte's newly opened asylum, popularly named "the Green House" (Casa Verde), passes to take inside of its walls not only mentally ill patients but also healthy citizens who, according to the doctor's diagnoses, are about to develop some sort of mental illness.

Chapters 5–10

Porfírio, the town's barber, indicts Bacamarte for his corruptive influence over the Municipal Council, which since the beginning approved the experiments taken place at the Green House, "the Bastille of human Knowledge". A revolt and council change ensues, but the new regime proposes an alliance to the alienist, until being toppled back to the original council. The local priest also misquotes Dante.

Chapters 11–12

This gives pause to Bacamarte, who changes his tack and decides that balanced people are actually a small minority, and thus the anomaly that should be cured: the modest, the loyal, the wise, the patient, etc., are now admitted to be scientifically disequilibrated according to his new theory.

Chapter 13

After they all have been "cured" and discharged, Bacamarte eventually considers that he is the most well-balanced person of the village and thus the one most in need of treatment. Uncompromising to the last, he locks himself alone into his asylum, where he dies seventeen months later. The village concludes that he was the only madman from day one. "Be that as it may, his funeral was conducted with great pomp and rare solemnity."

== English editions ==
- 1963, The Psychiatrist, and Other Stories (trans. William L. Grossman for the novella and three stories, and Helen Caldwell for the other 8 stories), University of California
- 2012, The Alienist (trans. William Grossman), Melville House
- 2013, The Alienist and Other Stories of Nineteenth-century Brazil (trans. John Charles Chasteen), Hackett

== Modern fiction ==
In 2000, Moacyr Scliar published the juvenile novel O Mistério da Casa Verde, about a group of children investigating the Casa Verde in the 20th century. In 2010, Natália Klein published the science fiction novel O Alienista Caçador de Mutantes, the Casa Verde imprisons victims of mutation, caused by the fall of a flying saucer in Itaguaí.

== See also ==
- "The System of Doctor Tarr and Professor Fether", a short story by Edgar Allan Poe about an asylum run by the inmates.
