= Ronaldo Miranda =

Brazilian composer (born 1948)

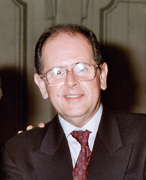
- Born: April 26, 1948 (age 78); Rio de Janeiro, Brazil
- Education: Escola de Música da Universidade Federal do Rio de Janeiro
- Occupations: Composer, Music Professor
- Notable work: Dom Casmurro, A Tempestade

Ronaldo Miranda (b. April 26, 1948 Rio de Janeiro) is a Brazilian composer and music professor.

Miranda studied at the Escola de Música da Universidade Federal do Rio de Janeiro, under Henrique Morelenbaum for composition and Dulce de Saules for piano.

From 1974 to 1981 Miranda was the primary music critic for the Jornal do Brasil.

In 1977, Miranda won first prize in the chamber music category at the Concurso Nacional de Composição para a II Bienal de Música Brasileira Contemporânea da Sala Cecília Meireles. After this, he became a freelance composer. The following year, he represented Brazil at the Tribune International de Componistes de UNESCO in Paris, France. In 1981 he was awarded a gold medal by the governor of Rio de Janeiro state. He was in the program at the World Music Days in Aarhus, Denmark in 1983, at the Tenth Musik-Biennale in Berlin, Germany, and at the World Music Days in Budapest, Hungary in 1986.

His opera Dom Casmurro premiered at the Municipal Theater of São Paulo in 1992, and was very popular with both audience and critics. In 2001, he won the Troféu Carlos Gomes and the Composer of the Year award by the governor of São Paulo state.

Miranda's works have been performed at the Queen Elizabeth Hall in London, England; the Zürich Town Hall in Zürich, Switzerland; the Mozarteum concert hall in Salzburg, Austria; the Teatro Colón in Buenos Aires, Argentina; and in Carnegie Hall in New York City.

On September 22, 2006 premiered at the Theatro São Pedro in São Paulo his opera "A Tempestade" ("The Tempest"), to which he wrote the libretto himself based on the homonymous play by William Shakespeare.

His Fantasia for Saxophone and Piano (1984) is now standard part of the Brazilian chamber music repertoire.

== Works ==
- Macunaíma - balé - (2022)
- Fragmentos de um Inverno Solar - 2015
- Variações Temporais – Beethoven Revisitado - 2014
- O Menino e a Liberdade (ópera) - 2013
- Concerto para Violino e Orquestra (2009)
- Missa brevis: o sagrado em celebração da capela real - coro e orquestra - 2007
- A Tempestade (ópera) - 2006
- Valsa Só (2005) para piano
- Frevo (2004) para piano a quatro mãos
- Variações Asorovarc (2002) para piano
- Três Micro-Peças (2001) para piano
- Horizontes - para orquestra sinfônica - 1992
- Dom Casmurro (ópera) - 1992
- Variações Sérias sobre um tema de Anacleto de Medeiros (1991) para quinteto de sopros
- Tango (1991) para piano a 4 mãos
- Suíte Tropical (1990) para banda sinfônica
- Concertino para Piano e Orquestra de Cordas (1986)
- Appassionata1984 para violão
- Estrela Brilhante (1984) para piano
- Concerto para Piano e Orquestra (1983)
- Toccata (1982) para piano
- Prólogo, Discurso e Reflexão (1980)
- Suíte nº 3 (1973) para piano - 4 movimentos
- Cantares (1969) para canto e piano
- Prelúdio e Fuga (1965) para piano

=== Discography ===
- Canções Brasileiras (2000) - Sandra Félix (canto) e Scheila Glaser (piano). Paulus Editora.
- Encantamento (2001) - Brazilian Guitar Quartet
- Brazilian Mosaic (2003) - Clélia Iruzun
- Patrícia Bretas interpreta Ronaldo Miranda (2013)
- Xangô (2015) - Quaternaglia
- Fragmentos de um Inverno Solar (2015) - Trio Tokeshi-Rosas-Bazarian
- Ronaldo Miranda: Piano Concerto; Concertino; Horizontes; Variacoes Temporais (2025) - Filarmônica de Minas Gerais, Eduardo Monteiro ao piano. Naxos
