= Quincas Borba =

1891 novel by Machado de Assis

- Frontispiece of the second edition of 1891.
- Author: Machado de Assis
- Original title: Quincas Borba
- Language: Portuguese
- Publication date: 1891
- Publication place: Brazil

Quincas Borba is a novel written by the Brazilian writer Machado de Assis. It was first published in 1891. It is also known in English as Philosopher or Dog? The novel was principally written as a serial in the journal A Estação from 1886 to 1891. It was definitively published as a book in 1892 with some small, but significant changes from the serialized version.

Following The Posthumous Memoirs of Bras Cubas (1881) and preceding Dom Casmurro (1899), this book is considered by modern critics to be the second of Machado de Assis's realist trilogy, in which the author was concerned with using pessimism and irony to criticize the customs and philosophy of his time, in the process parodying scientism, Social darwinism, and Comte's positivism, although he did not remove all Romantic elements from the plot.

In contrast to the earlier novel of the trilogy, Quincas Borba was written in third person, telling the story of Rubião, a naive young man who becomes a disciple and later the heir of the titular philosopher Quincas Borba, a character in the earlier novel. While living according to the fictional "Humanitist" philosophy of Quincas Borba, Rubião befriends and is fooled by the greedy Christiano and his wife Sofia who manage to take him for his entire inheritance.
