= Helen Caldwell =

American poet

- Born: July 9, 1904
- Died: April 12, 1987 (aged 82)
- Occupations: Writer; literary critic; translator; poet

Helen Caldwell (July 9, 1904 – April 12, 1987) was a scholar and Brazilianist from California. Her work focuses on the 19th century Brazilian writer Machado de Assis. She completed the first English translation of Dom Casmurro, published in 1953. Her most famous work is Machado de Assis: The Brazilian Master and His Novels (University of California, Los Angeles, 1970). She also translated 8 of the 12 stories in The Psychiatrist, and Other Stories (with William L. Grossman for the eponymous novella and three other stories) in 1973.

== Works ==
- The Brazilian Othelo of Machado de Assis. University of California Press Berkeley. 1960..
- Machado de Assis: The Brazilian Master and His Novels
