= Thomas J. Trebat =

American economist, political scientist, and professor

Thomas J. Trebat is an American economist, political scientist, and professor. He teaches at the School of International and Public Affairs (SIPA), at Columbia University. He is also the director of the Columbia Global Centers | Rio de Janeiro, Columbia University's representation in Brazil. He has served as executive director at Columbia University's Institute of Latin American Studies (ILAS) and Center for Brazilian Studies. He became head of ILAS when his colleague Albert Fishlow, who had brought him to the Institute, stepped down.

Trebat earned his PhD in economics at Vanderbilt University, and his dissertation, Brazil's State-owned Enterprises: A Case Study of the State as Entrepreneur, was published by the University of Cambridge's Press in 1983. The dissertation is on Brazilian's State's role in the economy, focusing on the importance of Petrobras. It has been used as reference by several researchers of the Brazilian economy and the role the state plays in it.

Trebat has several other academic publications, and has spent a vast part of his career doing research and reports, on the economy of Latin America for banks and investors. He has worked for Bankers Trust, Chemical Bank, Salomon Brothers and Citigroup, where he was head of the Emerging Markets Research Department. During the 1980s he played a key role during the negotiations of the foreign debt of Brazil, Chile and Mexico.

Trebat is linked to several business leaders in Brazil, such as Jorge Paulo Lemann, Antenor Barros Leal, Armínio Fraga, Israel Klabin, Marcelo Haddad and Marcos Troyjo, who are all members of Columbia Global Centers | Latin America (Rio de Janeiro)'s Advisory Board.

He is frequently asked to give his views and opinions on matters related to the economy and the politics of Brazil.

He has served as director for Latin America Project at Ford Foundation and is a member of the Council on Foreign Relations.

== Works ==
- Trebat, T. J., Baer, Newfarmer, "On State Capitalism in Brazil: Some New Issues and Questions", (co-authored with Baer and Newfarmer), Inter-American Economic Affairs, Vol. 30, No. 3, Winter 1976, pp. 69–92.
- Trebat, T. J., "Public Enterprise in Latin America", a special issue edited with Saulniers and Wogart, Journal of Interamerican Studies, Vol. 22, No. 4, November 1980.
- Trebat, T. J., "Public Enterprises in and : A Comparison of Origins and Performance", in Bruneau and Faucher, eds., Authoritarian Capitalism, : Westview Press, 1981.
- Trebat, T. J., "Latin American External Debt in the Eighties: A Case Study of Brazil", in Jorge et al., eds., Foreign Debt and Latin American Economic Development, : Pergamon Press, 1983.
- Trebat, T. J., "’s Foreign Financing", in Peggy B. Musgrave, ed., and the, : Westview Press, 1985, pp. 33–71.
- Trebat, T. J., "Country Risk Evaluation", in Robert Aliber, ed., Handbook of International Financial Management, : Dow-Jones, 1989, pp. 638–660.
- Trebat, T. J., "The Banking System Crisis in ", Contemporary Policy Issues, Vol. IX, No. 1, January 1991, pp. 54–66.
- Trebat, T. J., "Resolving the Latin American Debt Crisis: Prospects for the 1990s", in Werner Baer et al., eds., Latin America: The Crisis of the Eighties and the Opportunities of the Nineties, Urbana-Champaign: Press, 1991.
- Trebat, T. J., "International Business and Public Policy Debate in Latin America", in Goodwin and Nacht, eds., Beyond Government: Extending the Public Policy Debate in Emerging Democracies, : Westview Press, 1995.
- Trebat, T. J., "Emerging Markets Debt: Recent Developments", in Finnerty and Fridson, eds., Yearbook of Fixed Income Investing 1995, : Irwin, 1996, pp. 117–137.
- Trebat, T. J., Hargis, K., Petry, J., "Finding Relative Value in Emerging Markets", Emerging Markets Quarterly, Vol. 2, No. 2, Summer 1998.
