= Shelton H. Davis =

- Born: August 13, 1942; Pittsburgh, PA
- Died: 27 May 2010 (aged 67)
- Education: Antioch College
- Known for: contributions to cultural anthropology, public interest anthropology, Latin American indigenous peoples activism
- Scientific career
- Fields: Cultural Anthropology
- Workplaces: Harvard College; The World Bank; Georgetown University

Shelton H. Davis (August 13, 1942 – May 27, 2010) was an American cultural anthropologist and activist for the rights of indigenous peoples. His academic and organizational work with Latin American indigenous communities contributed to the late 20th century public interest anthropology movement.

He created Harvard University's first undergraduate course on Native Americans in the United States. Victims of the Miracle, his in-depth account of the social and environmental impact of the Brazilian Amazon development program in the 1970s, is considered a seminal work in cultural anthropology. The Anthropology Resource Center, which Davis founded in 1975, was cited by Ralph Nader as an exemplifier of anthropology in the public interest— anthropology that, in Davis' words, "would give information not to bureaucrats for the purpose of social engineering but to citizens and community groups for the purpose of social change.” His work as Principal Sociologist at the World Bank was key to the mainstreaming of social issues – such as social impact assessments and social inclusion of indigenous peoples during Bank project preparation – into World Bank policy during the 1990s.

== Life ==
He was Sector Manager in the Social Development Unit, Environmentally and Socially Sustainable Development, Latin America and Caribbean Region (LCSES) at the World Bank in Washington, D.C. where he was responsible for the Bank's work on social development, including tribal and indigenous peoples, civil society, resettlement, etc. He was Principal Sociologist in the Social Development Department from its creation in 1997 to August 1998. Between 1991 and 1997, he served as Principal Sociologist in the World Bank's central Environment Department; and before this, he worked in the Latin America and Caribbean Region's Environment Division.

Between 1984 and 1986, he was a visiting scholar at the OAS Inter-American Commission on Human Rights where he conducted a study of international mechanisms for protecting the human rights of forest-dwelling Indian populations in lowland South America. He was also the co-founder with Marie Helene Laraque, and director of, a hemispheric Indian documentation center called Indigena, Inc. in Berkeley, California (1973 1975), and the Anthropology Resource Center in Boston, Massachusetts (1975 1984).

He has written extensively on indigenous peoples, environment and development issues in Latin America, and his book Victims of the Miracle: Development and the Indians of Brazil (Cambridge University Press, 1977) is considered a classic in the field. He is also the author of Land Rights and Indigenous Peoples: The Role of the Inter-American Commission on Human Rights (Cultural Survival, 1988); and the editor of Indigenous Views of Land and Environment (The World Bank, 1993) and, Traditional Knowledge and Sustainable Development (The World Bank, 1995).

Dr. Davis has taught at the Federal University of Rio de Janeiro, Harvard University, University of California, Berkeley, the Massachusetts Institute of Technology, Boston University, Clark University, the University of Massachusetts Amherst and most recently at Georgetown University.

He received his undergraduate degree in Sociology and Anthropology at Antioch College (1965) and his Ph.D. in Social Anthropology from Harvard University (1970). He also did special studies in Social Anthropology at the London School of Economics and Political Science (1963 and 1964), and doctoral research among Mayan Indians in Guatemala (1967 1969).

== Publications ==
- Victims of the Miracle: Development and the Indians of Brazil (Cambridge University Press, 1977)
