= Hélder Macedo =

Portuguese writer (born 1935)

Hélder Malta Macedo (born November 1935 in Krugersdorp) is a Portuguese writer.

His father was a colonial administrator in Zambézia, Mozambique, where Macedo grew up until the age of 12. His opposition to the Salazar regime caused him to seek exile in London during the 1950s.
