= Philip Fearnside =

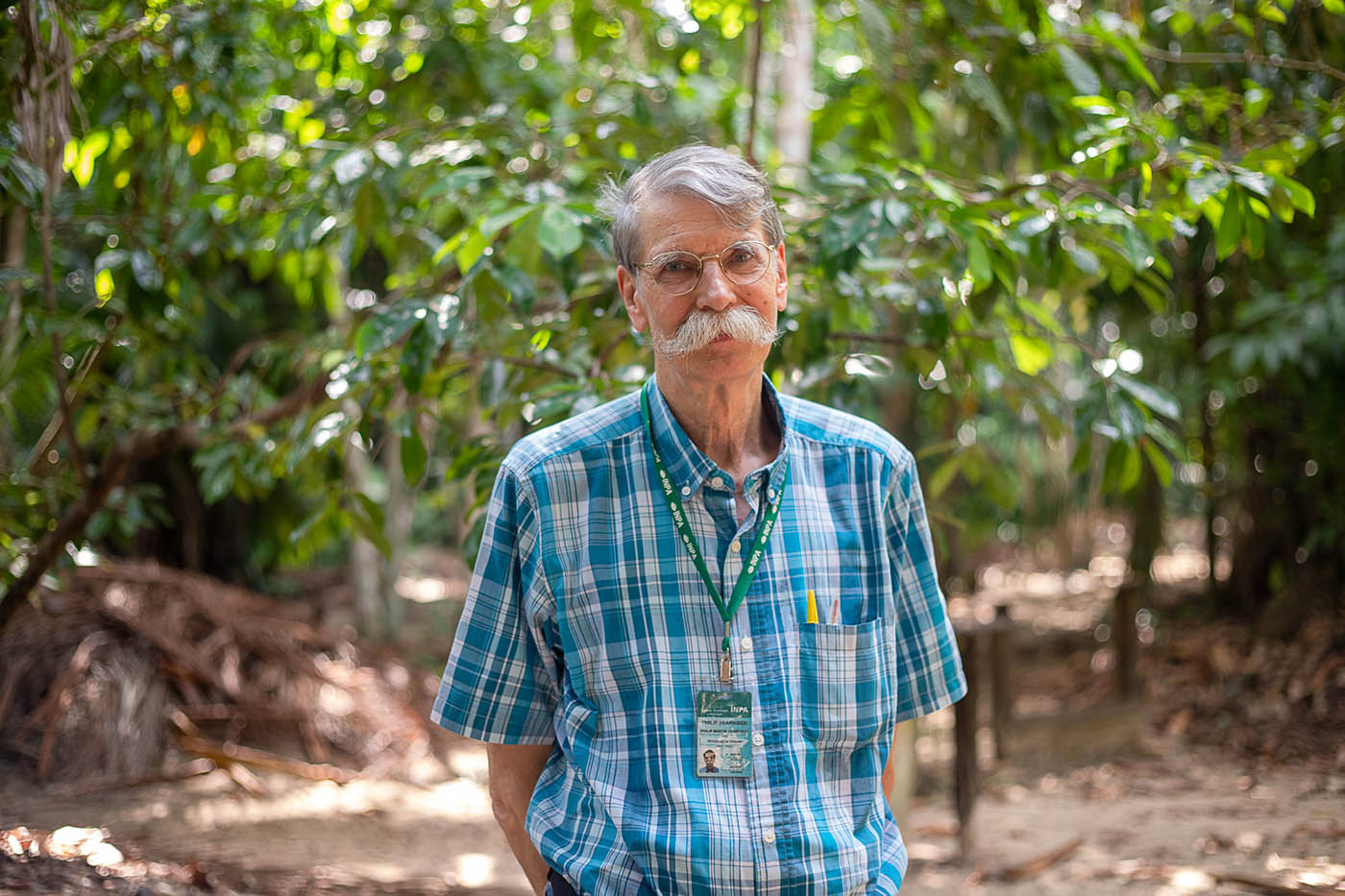
- Fearnside at INPA, 2022
- Born: Philip Martin Fearnside; May 25, 1947 (age 78); Berkeley, California, U.S.
- Education: Colorado College; University of Michigan
- Scientific career
- Institutions: National Institute of Amazonian Research

Philip Martin Fearnside (born May 25, 1947) is an American biologist and scientist, active for many years in Brazil, where he developed the most important part of his career and gained wide national and international notoriety.

== Biography ==
Fearnside was born in Berkeley, California, and has a bachelor's degree in biology at Colorado College. At the University of Michigan, he did his master's and PhD in the same area. He has worked especially on issues of tropical agro-ecosystems, deforestation, environmental degradation and their impact on society, sustainable development and climate change. Fearnside has a large published bibliography (http://philip.inpa.gov.br), which includes studies that contributed to the increase of the knowledge about the fires, the capacity of human support in colonization areas, the rhythm, environmental causes and impacts of deforestation in the Amazon; for the development of techniques for sustainable management of nature, and for the renewal of methodologies for assessing greenhouse gas emissions, among other topics.

== Career ==
He began his professional career as a graduate student, leaving for Asia as an agent of the Peace Corps, a technology and humanitarian aid body of the US government, operating between 1969 and 1971 in the state of Rajasthan, India,. Returning to the United States, he finished his higher studies, intending to return later to India, but the beginning of an armed conflict caused him to direct his interests to the Amazon, installing in Brazil, where since 1978 he is a scientist at the National Institute of Amazonian Research (INPA), headquartered in Manaus, Brazil.

He is a researcher at the Coordination of Research in Environmental Dynamics at INPA. Since 1983, he has been deepening his studies on the impact of deforestation on the greenhouse effect, trying to highlight the economic, political and social importance of forest preservation, as well as its ecological importance.

He has been an active voice in defending the Brazilian environment and alert to the dangers of deforestation and global warming. In 2003, Pesquisa Fapesp magazine published a story about the biologist and reported that "today, three decades after landing in the region, Fearnside accumulates field experience – even lived in villages along the Trans-Amazonian Highway to do his doctorate – and scientific knowledge about the Amazon rarely found in Brazilians [...] His name is an international reference in many of the themes that make the great tropical forest an important and controversial subject, such as the possible relation between forest deforestation and climate change on the planet and the impact of the implementation of roads, dams and agricultural projects in the region. For his work in favor of sustainable development against offensive projects to the environment, such as the construction of the Balbina Dam power plant in the 1980s, he is often challenged by supporters of progress.
