= Ronald H. Chilcote =

American political economist

- Born: February 20, 1935 (age 91); Cleveland, Ohio
- Education: Stanford University
- Scientific career
- Fields: Political science
- Workplaces: University of California, Riverside

Ronald H. Chilcote (born February 20, 1935) is a political economist from the United States. He is currently the Edward A. Dickson Emeritus Professor of Economics and Political Science at the University of California, Riverside, and has served as managing editor of the academic journal Latin American Perspectives since its founding in 1974. Chilcote's main area of research is on Brazil, Portugal and the former Portuguese colonies in Africa, as well as comparative politics, political economy and development theory.

== Early life and education ==
Chilcote came from an upper-middle-class Republican family that owned a small business in Cleveland, Ohio, manufacturing photo mounts. Following several members of his family, he attended Dartmouth College.

He enrolled in the Stanford University Graduate School of Business to study for an M.B.A. He pursued the M.A. program at Stanford and then a Ph.D. program in political economy.

He married Frances Bunker Chilcote, the daughter of Paul B. Tubby of Belmont in 1961 and they have two sons, Edward and Stephen.

== Career ==
=== Teaching ===
Chilcote taught in the departments of Economics and Political Science at the University of California, Riverside (UCR) from 1964 to 1994, where he was honored with the Distinguished Teaching Award. Since 1994, he has been professor emeritus. He was a founder of the Latin American studies major, served as director of the Program on Latin American Studies for over 15 years, and as professor emeritus continues to serve on the Latin American Studies Steering Committee. He also established the UC Brazil Studies Center in Rio de Janeiro and served as its director from 1992-1994.

He established a graduate program in comparative political economy.

=== Journal editorship: Latin American Perspectives ===
In 1974, Chilcote was a founder of the academic journal Latin American Perspectives (LAP), focused on critical theoretical and empirical work related to Latin America, which had few academic outlets in the United States at that time. It was organized as an independent editorial collective, with Chilcote serving as the elected managing editor from its founding to the present. It emphasized scholarship that analyzes national and transnational systems of power and the movements for structural transformation, social justice and human rights in Latin America. The founders published work from a range of approaches, including Marxism, and also brings the work of Latin American scholars to an English-speaking readership, including translating Spanish and Portuguese manuscripts.

The first issue of the journal focused on the debates within dependency theory in Latin America, with a lead article by Chilcote, "Dependency: A Critical Synthesis of the Literature", and contributions from leading Latin American theorists. In the Summer-Fall 1981 edition, Chilcote explored the relationship of dependency and Marxism. A consistent proponent of class analysis, Chilcote critiqued the neo-Marxist and postmodernist theoretical currents that developed as approaches to new social movements, as expressed in his lead article in LAP's 1990 thematic issue on "Post-Marxism, the Left, and Democracy". Since the setbacks for Latin American revolutionary movements and the collapse of the Soviet Union, the journal's content reflected the shift toward critical analysis of the ascendant Washington Consensus around neoliberalism and the resistance to it by social movements. LAP approached neoliberal globalization from the perspective of imperialism and class analysis, as illustrated by Chilcote's article "Globalization or Imperialism?" in the November 2002 issue.

=== Book editorships ===
==== Latin American Perspectives Book Series ====
Chilcote currently edits the Latin American Perspectives in the Classroom and Critical Currents book series for Rowman and Littlefield. The Classroom series introduces issues that have appeared in the journal to students in the social sciences and Latin American studies. The Critical Currents series of 13 books examines the institutional, political, economic, and social forces that are shaping contemporary Latin America, considered in a context of current theoretical issues and debates.

Chilcote previously edited Latin American Perspectives Monographs with 24 titles for Westview Press (1980-2000).

=== Scholarly research and writing ===
Chilcote is the author of over 200 academic publications, including books, book chapters, and peer-reviewed journal articles, with emphasis on comparative politics, political economy, and development economics. He was one of the earliest U.S. scholars to assess Latin American dependency theory, as in his lead article in the first issue of Latin American Perspectives, "Dependency: A Critical Synthesis of the Literature." He also edited and/or contributed to several additional LAP issues on the subject. He wrote a book on the topic, Latin America: The Struggle with Dependency and Beyond (1974), edited with his student and colleague Joel Edelstein, which was used as a college text and went through eight printings. His Theories of Comparative Politics was used for advanced graduate study in the United States, and he wrote two books on comparative political economy as well as an anthology of retrospective essays on imperialism.

Chilcote has produced extensive scholarship on Brazil, Portugal, and the former Portuguese colonies in Africa, visiting all many times in the course of his research. His work on Lusophone Africa in the 1960s provided a foundation for an African perspective critical of the Portuguese presence in Angola, Mozambique, Guinea-Bissau, and Cape Verde. He published a book on the African revolutionary, Amílcar Cabral, who inspired and led the independence movements. He has written four books on Brazil, three of which have been translated into Portuguese. His 2010 book The Portuguese Revolution: State and Class in the Transition to Democracy culminates decades of research to analyze the 1974–1975 Portuguese revolution and its aftermath through periods of authoritarianism and resistance as well as representative and popular democracy. His 2014 book Intellectuals and the Search for National Identity in Twentieth Century Brazil likewise draws on his decades of research in Brazil and the relationships he developed with Brazilian intellectuals, more than one hundred of whom were interviewed for the book.

His work has appeared in Brazilian, Malaysian, Korean, Chinese, Russian, and Iranian editions.

For his scholarship, Chilcote received three Fulbright awards, two Social Science Research Council grants, Organization of American States and Mellon-SOCCIS Latin American Fellowships, and Rockefeller and Ford Foundation grants.

=== Selected publications ===
==== Books ====
- Portuguese Africa. Englewood Cliffs, New Jersey: Prentice-Hall 1967. Pp. 149.
- (Editor). Protest and Resistance in Angola and Brazil: Comparative Essays. Berkeley and Los Angeles: University of California Press, 1972. Pp. 317. Contributed introduction, pp. 1–8 and Chapter 12, pp. 243–302.
- (Editor). Emerging Nationalism in Portuguese Africa: Documents. Stanford Stanford University, 1973. Pp. 642. Contributed introduction, pp. 17–57.
- (Editor with Joel C. Edelstein, Joel). Latin America: The Struggle with Dependency and Beyond. Cambridge and New York: Schenkman and John Wiley & Sons, 1974. Pp. 781. Contributed introduction, pp. 1–87.
- The Brazilian Communist Party: Conflict and Integration, 1922-1972. New York: Oxford University Press, 1974. Pp. 361.
- Theories of Comparative Politics: The Search for a Paradigm, Boulder, Colorado. Westview Press, 1981. Pp. 480.
- (Editor and contributor). Dependency and Marxism: Toward a Resolution of the Debate. Boulder, Colorado: Westview Press, 1982. Pp. 179.
- (Editor with Dale Johnson - editors and contributors). Theories of Development: Mode of Production or Dependency?. Los Angeles: Sage Publications, 1983. Contributed "Introduction."
- (Editor and contributor). Brazil in Crisis. Special Issue of Latin American Perspectives, Issue 40 (Winter 1984), 1-144.
- (Editor and contributor). Unity and Struggle: Reassessing the Thought of Amílcar Cabral. Special Issue of Latin American Perspectives, Issue 41 (Spring 1984), 1-104.
- Theories of Development and Underdevelopment. Boulder: Westview Press, 1984, Pp. 179.
- With Joel C. Edelstein. Latin America: Capitalist and Socialist Perspectives of Development and Underdevelopment. Boulder: Westview Press, 1986. Pp. 175.
- Power and the Ruling Classes in Northeast Brazil: Juazeiro and Petrolina in Transition. Cambridge and New York: Cambridge University Press, 1990. Pp. 383.
- Chilcote, S. Hadjiyannis, Fred A. López, Daniel Nataf, and Elizabeth Sammis. Transitions from Dictatorship to Democracy: Comparative Studies of Spain, Portugal, and Greece. New York: Taylor and Francis, 1990. Pp. 220. Contributed Preface, Chapters 1 and 5.
- (Editor and contributor). Post-Marxism, the Left, and Democracy. Special Issue of Latin American Perspectives, Issue 65, 17 (Spring 1990), 1- 128.
- Amílcar Cabral's Revolutionary Theory and Practice. Boulder: Lynne Rienner Publishers, 1991.
- Theories of Comparative Politics: The Search for a Paradigm Revisited. Boulder: Westview Press, 1994, Second edition, substantial revision and update of 1981 edition. Pp. 421.
- (Editor), The Political Economy of Imperialism. Kluwer Academic Press, 1999. Pp. 270. Paperback Edition: Rowman and Littlefield, 2001. Includes Preface, pp. vii and "Introduction" pp. 19–40.
- (Editor). Imperialism. Theoretical Directions. Amherst, New York: Humanity Press, 2000.
- Comparative Inquiry in Politics and Political Economy: Theories and Issues. Boulder: Westview Press, 2000. Pp. 216
- Theories of Comparative Political Economy: Theories and Directions. Boulder: Westview Press, 2000. Pp. 316.
- Nature's Laguna Wilderness. Laguna Beach: Laguna Wilderness Press, 2003. Pp. 96.
- Development in Theory and Practice: Latin American Perspectives. Lanham, Md: Rowman and Littlefield Publishers, 2003. Pp. 394.
- (Editor). Alternatives to Neoliberalism in Latin America. Selected Papers from Latin American Perspectives. Beijing: Chinese Academy of Social Sciences, 2004. Pp. 334.
- (Editor). Wind River Wilderness. Laguna Beach: Laguna Wilderness Press, 2006. Pp. 144.
- The Portuguese Revolution: State and Class in the Transition to Democracy. Lanham, Ms: Rowman and Littlefield, 2010. Pp. 316. A revolução portuguesa. Porto: Afrontamento, 2014
- (Editor). The Wild Wyoming Range. Laguna Beach: Laguna Wilderness Press, 2013. Pp. 120.
- (Editor) Sabino Osuna's Photography At the Hour of Combat: Sabino: Osuna's Photographs of the Mexican Revolution, Laguna Beach: Laguna Wilderness Press, 2012, Pp. 120.
- Intellectuals and the Search for a National Identity in Brazil. New York: Cambridge University Press, 2014. Pp. 288.
- The Laguna Wilderness. Laguna Beach: Laguna Wilderness Press, 2014. Pp. 120.

==== Selected journal articles ====
- "The Political Thought of Amílcar Cabral," The Journal of Modern African Studies, 6, 3 (1968), 373-388.
- "Development and Nationalism in Portuguese Africa," Comparative Political Studies, I, 4 (January 1969), 501-525.
- "Brazil and Africa in Comparative Perspective," Latin American Research Review, 4 (Spring 1969), 125-136.
- "A Critical Synthesis of the Dependency Literature," Latin American Perspectives, I (Spring 1974), 4-29.
- "Amílcar Cabral: A Bio-Bibliography of His Life and Thought, 1925-1973," Africana Journal, 5, No. 4 (1974), 289-307.
- With Goldman, Roy, "Status Quo and Reform Attitudes of Backlands High School Students of Dominant Class Parents in Brazil, Chile, and Mexico," International Journal of Comparative Sociology, 16, Nos. 1-2 (1975), 37-50.
- With Gorman, Steve; Leroy, Cis; and Sheehan, Sara, "Internal and External Issues of Dependency: Approach, Pedagogical Method, and Critique of Two Courses on Latin America," Review of Radical Political Economy, 6 (Winter 1975), 80-94.
- "Ruling Classes and Dependency in Two Backland Communities of Northeast Brazil," Studies in Comparative International Development, 11 (1976), 35-50.
- "Class, Race, Progress, and Nationalism in Brazil," Latin American Research Review, 12, No. 1 (1977), 222-227.
- "A Question of Dependency," Latin American Research Review, 13, No. 2 (1978), 55-68
- "Perspectives of Class and Political Struggle in the Portuguese Capitalist State," Kapitalistate, 8 (1980), 99-120.
- "Politics of Conflict in the Popular Poetry of Northeast Brazil," Journal of Latin American Lore, 5, No. 2 (1979), 205-231.
- "Issues of Theory in Dependency and Marxism," Latin American Perspectives, 7 (Summer-Fall 1981), 3-16.
- "Politics and Ideology in the Popular Poetry of Brazil," Studies in Latin American Popular Culture, 2 (1983), 88-98.
- "Politics and Ideology in the Popular Poetry of Brazil," Ideologies and Literature, 4 (September–October 1983), 279-293.
- "The Theory and Practice of Amílcar Cabral: Revolutionary Implications for the Third World," Latin American Perspectives, 11 (Spring 1984), 3-14.
- "Teorias reformistas e revolucionárias de desenvolvimento e subdesenvolvimento," Revista de Economía Política, 3 (July–September 1983), 103-123.
- "Toward the Democratic Opening in Latin America: The Case of Brazil," Monthly Review 23 (February 1984), 15-24.
- "Sociedad y política en Portugal," Cuadernos Políticos, No. 28 (1982), 74-87.
- "A crise dos intelectuais," in Lua Nova (São Paulo) 2, No. 2 (July–September 1985), 82-86.
- "Reflections on Brazilian Political Thought and the Crisis of the Intellectual," in Luso-Brazilian Review (University of Wisconsin) 22 (Winter 1985), 111-121.
- "Developmental Theories: Current State of the Debate," Rasvoj/Development-International, I, (July–December 1986), 323-336.
- "Teorías do desenvolvimento: situação actual do debate," Economía e Socialismo, 10, 69-70 (December 1986), 67-75.
- "Perspectivas alternativas de política comparada," Revista de Ciencia Política, 31 (April–June 1988), 52-65.
- "Família e classe dominante em duas comunidades sertanejas do Nordeste Brasileiro," Revista Brasileira de Estudos Políticos, 67-68 (July 1988-January 1989), 181- 208.
- "Post-Marxism: The Retreat from Class in Latin America," Latin American Perspectives, 17 (Spring 1990), 3-24.
- "Post-Marxism and its Ideological Impact on the Theory and Practice of U.S. Politics," Cuadernos de Trabajo. Análisis e Investigaciones, 6 (April 1988), 23- 31.
- "Tensions in the Latin American Experience: Fundamental Themes in the Formulation of a Research Agenda for the 1990s," Latin American Perspectives, 17 (Spring 1990), 122-128.
- "Contradictions in the Search for a Class Theory of the State, Socialism, and Democracy," Socialism in the World, 74-75 (1989), 129-139 and Commentary on pp. 106–107.
- "Perspectivas do capitalismo e do socialismo na busca de una teoría de classe do estado e da democracia, Revista de Economía Política, 10 (October–December 1990), 103-123.
- with Chilcote, Edward B. "The Crisis of Marxism: An Appraisal of New Directions," Rethinking Marxism, 5 (Summer 1992), 84-106.
- "The Left in Latin America: Questions of Theory and Practice," Latin American Perspectives 30 (July 2003), 10-15.
- "Trotsky and Development Theory in Latin America," Critical Sociology, 35 (6) 2010, 719-741. Published in Portuguese as "Influências trotskyistas sobre a teoria do desenvolvimento da América Latina,"Revista de Ciências Sociais 40 (No. 1) 2010, 73-98. Also as "Trotsky e a teoria latino-americana do desenvolvimento," Revista Crítica Marxists, No.34 (2012),87-110.
- Abu-El-Haj. Jawdat, and Ronald H. Chilcote. 2011. "Intellectuals, Social Theory, and Political Practice in Brazil," Latin American Perspectives 38 (No. 3) 2011, 5-39.
- 2013. "Introduction: A Retrospective and Prospectus," Latin American Perspectives, 40 No. 6 (2013), 5-10.

==== Reference works ====
- (Editor). Emerging Nationalism in Portuguese Africa: A Bibliography of Documentary Ephemera Through 1965. Stanford: Stanford University, 1970. Pp. 114. Emerging Nationalism in Portuguese Africa: Documents, Stanford: Stanford University, 1972. Pp. 646.
- (Editor). Revolution and Structural Change in Latin America: Ideology, Development and the Radical Left (1930-1965). Stanford: Stanford University, 1970, 2 Vols. Pp. 668 and pp. 602.
- (Editor and compiler). Brazil and its Radical Left: An Annotated Bibliography of the Communist Movement and the Rise of Marxism, 1922-1972. New York: Kraus International Publications, 1980. Pp. 455. Sequel to Brazilian Communist Party: Conflict and Integration, 1922-1972. New York: Oxford University Press, 1974.
- (Editor with Sheryl Lutjens). Cuba, 1953-1978: A Bibliographical Guide to the Literature. White Plains, NY: Kraus International Publications, 1986. Pp. 1387 in two volumes.
- (Editor and compiler). The Portuguese Revolution of 25 April 1974: Annotated Bibliography on the Antecedents and Aftermath. Vol 1. Coimbra: Centro de Documentação 25 de Abril, Universidade de Coimbra, 1987. Pp. 329. Vol 2: Periodicals. Portuguese Political, Popular, and Mass Organizations. Coimbra: Centro de Documentação 25 de Abril. Universidade de Coimbra, 1998. Pp. 295.
