= Pierre Monbeig =

French geographer

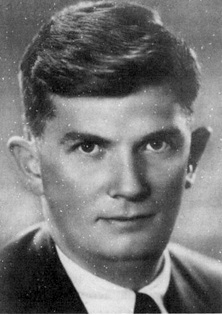
Pierre Monbeig (1934)

Pierre Monbeig (15 September 1908 – 22 September 1987) was a French geographer.

== Biography ==
Firstly Monbeig was professor in the lyceum Malherbe de Caen in 1931. In the year of 1935 he take the position of professor of physical and human Geography in the University of São Paulo (USP), in Brazil. Later he was president of the Brazilian Geographers Association and participate in the Brazilian Conselho Nacional de Geografia. He stayed in São Paulo till 1946. Today the University of São Paulo have a chair with his name for the study of contemporaneous Brazilian Geography.

In 1947 he returned to France and researched in French National Centre for Scientific Research (CNRS). After that he taught at the University of Strasbourg, simultaneously with the post in Paris.

In 1957 he took up a position as professor of economic geography in the Conservatoire National des Arts et Métiers (CNAM), and founded the Institute for Advanced Latin American Studies. Subsequently, in 1961 he taught at the University of Paris (Pantheon-Sorbonne University) and became director of the department of human sciences in the CNRS. In 1963, the University of São Paulo awarded him an honorary doctorate. He retired in 1977.

== Works ==
- Pierre Monbeig, Ensaios de geografia humana brasileira, São Paulo, Livraria Martins, 1940, 294 p.
- Pierre Monbeig, La Crise des sciences de l’homme, Rio de Janeiro, Casa do Estudante do Brasil, 1943, 64 p.
- Pierre Monbeig, Pionniers et planteurs de l’État de São Paulo, Paris, Librairie Armand Colin, 1952, 376 p.
- Pierre Monbeig, La Croissance de la ville de São Paulo », Revue de géographie alpine, 1953.
- Pierre Monbeig, Le Brésil, Paris, PUF, coll. Que sais-je?, 1954.
- Pierre Monbeig, 1957 - Novos Estudos de Geografia Humana Brasileira, São Paulo, Difusão Européia do Livro, 1957, 248 p.
- Pierre Monbeig, 1984 - Pioneiros e fazendeiros de São Paulo, São Paulo, Editora Hucitec/ Polis, 1984, 392 p.
