= Afrânio Coutinho =

Brazilian literary critic and essayist

Portrait of Afrânio Coutinho

Afrânio Coutinho (March 15, 1911 – August 5, 2000) was a Brazilian literary critic and essayist. He encouraged the rise of the "New Criticism" in Brazil of the 1950s. Coutinho edited the Portuguese version of Reader's Digest as well as several reference works on Brazilian literature. He also taught literature at several universities.

== Works ==
- Daniel Rops e a ânsia do sentido novo da existência - ensaio (1935)
- O humanismo, ideal de vida - ensaio (1938)
- L'Exemple du métissage, in L'Homme de couleur - ensaio (1939)
- A filosofia de Machado de Assis - crítica (1940)
- Aspectos da literatura barroca - história literária (1951)
- O ensino da literatura - discurso de posse na cátedra de Literatura do Colégio Pedro II (1952)
- Correntes cruzadas - crítica (1953)
- Da crítica e da nova crítica (1957)
- Euclides, Capistrano e Araripe - crítica (1959)
- Introdução à literatura no Brasil - história literária (1959)
- A crítica (1959)
- Machado de Assis na literatura brasileira - crítica (1960)
- Conceito de literatura brasileira - ensaio (1960)
- "O Impressionismo na Literatura Brasileira - In Cadernos Brasileiros #3 (1962)
- No hospital das letras - polêmica (1963)
- A polêmica Alencar-Nabuco - história literária (1965)
- Crítica e poética - ensaio (1968)
- A tradição afortunada - história literária (1968)
- Crítica e críticos (1969)
- Caminhos do pensamento crítico - ensaios (1974)
- Notas de teoria literária - didática (1976)
- Universidade, instituição crítica - ensaio (1977)
- Evolução da crítica literária brasileira - história literária (1977)
- O erotismo na literatura: o caso Rubem Fonseca - crítica (1979)
- Tristão de Athayde, o crítico - crítica (1980)
- O processo da descolonização literária - história literária (1983)
- As formas da literatura brasileira - ensaio (1984)
- Reformulação do currículo de Letras - educação (1984)
- Impertinências - artigos e ensaios (1990)
- Do Barroco - ensaios (1994)
