= José Veríssimo =

Brazilian writer (1857–1916)

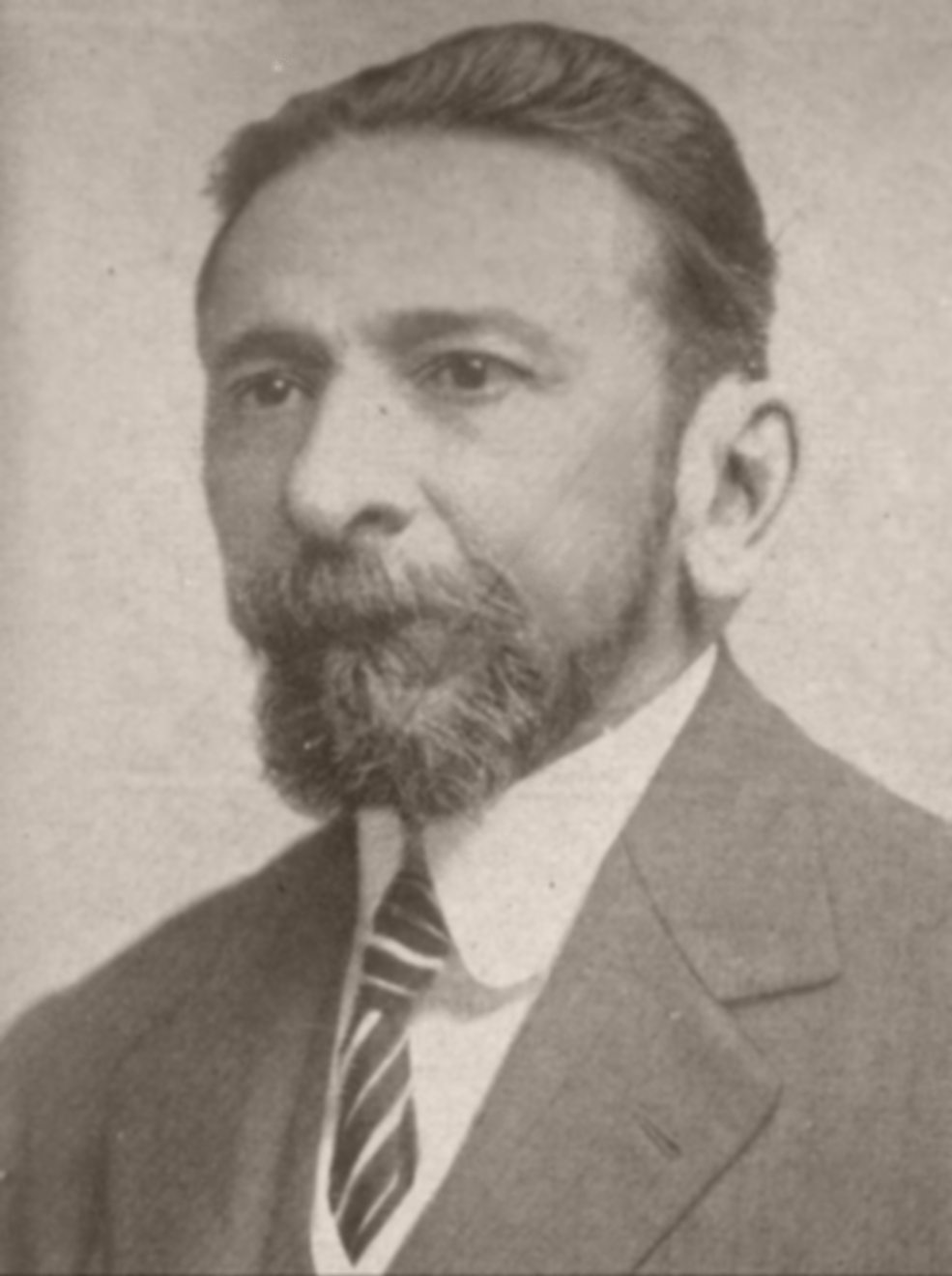
José Veríssimo, ca. 1900.

José Veríssimo Dias de Matos (8 April 1857 – 2 December 1916) was a writer, educator, journalist, literary critic, and founding member of the Brazilian Academy of Letters.

== Biography ==
José Veríssimo was born in Óbidos, Pará, the son of José Veríssimo de Matos and Ana Flora Dias de Matos. His early school-days were spent in Manaus and Belém. In 1869, he was sent to Rio de Janeiro to continue his studies, but had to return to Pará due to poor health. He then devoted himself zealously to journalism and teaching. In 1891, Veríssimo returned to Rio de Janeiro and took a position as professor in Colégio Pedro II. For some time (1895–1899), concurrently with his scholarly labors, he edited the famous Revista Brasileira.

== Works ==
- Primeiras Páginas (1878).
- Emilio Littré (1882).
- Diversos: Cenas da Vida Amazônica (1886).
- Questão de Limites: Pará e Amazonas (1889).
- Estudos Brasileiros (2 Vols., 1889–1904).
- Educação Nacional (1890).
- A Amazônia: Aspectos Econômicos (1892).
- A Pesca na Amazônia (1895).
- A Instrução Pública e a Imprensa (1900).
- Estudos de Literatura (6 vols., 1901–1907).
- Homens e Coisas Estrangeiras (3 Vols., 1902–1910).
- Que é Literatura e outros Escritos (1907).
- Interesses da Amazônia (1915).
- História da Literatura Brasileira (1916).
- Letras e Literatos (1936).

Selected articles

- "A Revolução Chilena e a Questão da América Latina", Revista Brasileira, Vol. 111, 1895, pp. 108–121.
- "Gregório de Mattos," Revista da Academia Brazileira de Letras, Vol. 2, 1912, p. 27–44.

== Notes ==
Preceded by João Francisco Lisboa (patron)	Brazilian Academy of Letters – Occupant of the 18th chair 1897–1916	Succeeded by Francisco Inácio Marcondes Homem de Melo
