= The Posthumous Memoirs of Brás Cubas =

1881 novel by Joaquim Maria Machado de Assis

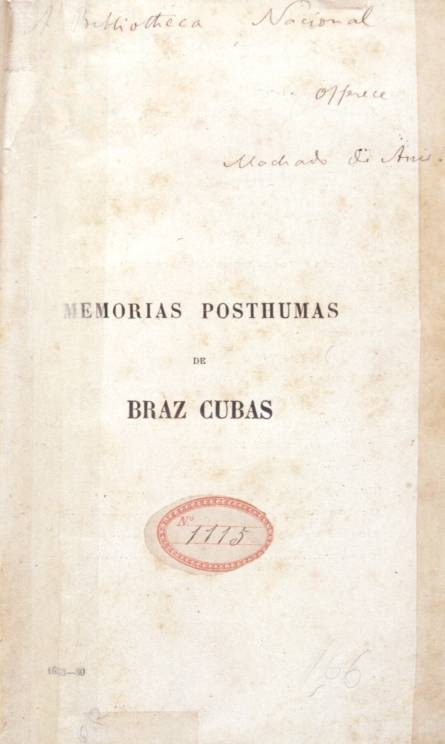
- The author dedicated this copy to the Biblioteca Nacional, the National Library of Brazil.
- Author: Joaquim Maria Machado de Assis
- Original title: Memórias Póstumas de Brás Cubas
- Translator: Gregory Rabassa
- Language: Portuguese
- Genre: Novel
- Publisher: Oxford University Press (Eng. Trans. hardback edition)
- Publication date: 1881 (1 October 1997 Eng. translation)
- Publication place: Brazil (Rio de Janeiro)
- Media type: Print (Hardback & Paperback)
- Pages: 238 p. (Eng. Trans. hardback edition)
- ISBN: 0-19-510169-3 (Eng. Trans. hardback edition)
- OCLC: 35586796
- Dewey Decimal: 869.3 20
- LC Class: PQ9697.M18 M513 1997

The Posthumous Memoirs of Brás Cubas (Portuguese: Memorias Posthumas de Braz Cubas, modern spelling Memórias Póstumas de Brás Cubas), also translated as Epitaph of a Small Winner, is a novel by the Brazilian writer Joaquim Maria Machado de Assis that is regarded as one of the greatest works of Brazilian literature. The book is presented as the memoirs of its protagonist, Brás Cubas, as told from beyond the grave.

Published in 1881, the novel has a unique style of short, erratic chapters shifting in tone and style. Instead of the clear and logical construction of a normal nineteenth-century realist novel, the novel makes use of surreal devices of metaphor and playful narrative construction.

== Outline ==
The novel is narrated by the dead protagonist, Brás Cubas, who tells his own life story from beyond the grave, noting his mistakes and failed romances.

The fact that he is already deceased allows Brás Cubas to sharply criticize Brazilian society and reflect on his own disillusionment, with no sign of remorse or fear of retaliation. Brás Cubas dedicates his book: "To the worm who first gnawed on the cold flesh of my corpse, I dedicate with fond remembrance these Posthumous Memoirs" (Portuguese: Ao verme que primeiro roeu as frias carnes do meu cadáver dedico com saudosa lembrança estas Memórias Póstumas), which indicates that not a single person he met through his life deserved the book. Cubas decides to tell his story starting from the end (the passage of his death, caused by pneumonia), then takes "the greatest leap in this story", proceeding to tell the story of his life since his childhood.

The novel is also connected to another Machado de Assis work, Quincas Borba, which features a character from the Memoirs (as a secondary character, despite the novel's name), but other works of the author are hinted in chapter titles. It is a novel recalled as a major influence by many post-modern writers, such as John Barth or Donald Barthelme, as well as Brazilian writers in the 20th century.

== Plot ==
The author explains the style of the book before beginning the story with his funeral and cause of death - "Brás Cubas poultice", a medical panacea that was his last obsession and "would guarantee him glory among men". He then goes back to his childhood.

He was a wealthy, spoiled, and wicked child. From an early age, he showed signs of a perverse nature, beating the heads of his slaves when he was not attended to in some desire or playing horse riding on the back of a young male slave named Prudêncio. At the age of seventeen, Brás Cubas falls in love with a prostitute named Marcela, an affair which lasts "fifteen months and eleven contos" and almost wipes out the family fortune.

To forget this heartbreak, the protagonist is sent to Coimbra to study law. After a few years of wild bohemianism, "following romanticism in practice and liberalism in theory," he returns to Rio de Janeiro on the occasion of the death of his mother. He falls in love with a girl named Eugênia, the daughter of Dona Eusébia, a poor friend of the family, who turns out to be lame from birth. His father plans to have a political marriage with Virgília, daughter of Conselheiro Dutra. However, Virgília prefers to marry Lobo Neves, who is also a candidate for a political career. With the death of Brás Cubas' father, conflict breaks out over the inheritance between him and his sister Sabina, and her husband Cotrim.

Virgília, now married, encounters Brás Cubas at a ball and they begin an adulterous affair. Virgília becomes pregnant but the child dies before being born. To keep the affair secret Brás Cubas bribes Virgília's former seamstress Dona Plácida to act as the resident of a small house in Gamboa, which serves as a meeting place for the lovers. Cubas meets Quincas Borba, a childhood friend who has fallen on hard times. He steals Cubas' watch, later returning it to him. He introduced Cubas to his philosophical system, Humanitism.

Pursuing fame or excitement, Brás Cubas becomes a deputy. Lobo Neves is appointed governor of a province and leaves with Virgília for the north, ending the affair. Sabina finds a wife for Brás Cubas, Nhã-Loló, Cotrim's 19-year-old niece, but she dies of yellow fever and Brás Cubas becomes a confirmed bachelor. He tried unsuccessfully to become Minister of State and to found an opposition newspaper. Quincas Borba shows signs of dementia. An aging Virgília asks him to support the impoverished Dona Plácida, who then dies. Lobo Neves, Marcela and Quincas Borba also die. Eugênia falls into poverty. His last attempt at glory is the "Brás Cubas poultice", a medicine that will cure all diseases. Ironically, while going out to take care of his project, he is caught in a rainstorm and catches pneumonia, from which he dies at age sixty-four. Virgília, accompanied by her son, visits his deathbed. After dying he begins to tell the story of his life backwards, concluding that on balance his life has been slightly positive because he has not had children, and thus he has not "transmitted the legacy of misery".

== Philosophy of Brás Cubas ==
Cubas considers his life in the manner of an accounting, finding neither any positives or negatives; but he then realises that since he has not fathered any children he has not passed on the "misery" of life any further. For this reason he considers his life a success. Assis published his work in 1881 and it is influenced by the philosophy of Arthur Schopenhauer, a German philosopher whose philosophical magnum opus, The World as Will and Representation was first published in 1818. Schopenhauer's influence on the novel's philosophy is without doubt when one compares Cubas' description of insects and his attitude towards animals, which is a feature of Schopenhauer's philosophical outlook; and in Schopenhauer's writing he similarly uses examples from the animal kingdom to illustrate a philosophical truth (most famously that of the Australian bull-ant). Assis' allusion to Schopenhauer's philosophy is also 'formal': the chapter structure of The Posthumous Memoirs mimics that of Schopenhauer's World as Will and Representation; Bras Cubas' "method" in the novel, specifically the practice of referring to incidents in previous chapters by the chapter number, is imitative. Schopenhauer is often referred to as the 'King' of pessimists, or the 'Philosopher of despair'; his outlook is heavily linked to that of Buddhism.

Assis created a philosophical theory to criticize Positivism, which was common in Brazil's literature back then. The theory in question was Humanitism, created in the books by Quincas Borba, a friend of Brás Cubas who had gone mad before dying. By doing this, Assis sharply criticizes the current philosophical theories, implying that only someone crazy would believe in them. Humanitism is to believe in Humanitas, which, according to Borba, is "the principle of the things, the same man equally distributed in all men". Therefore, if all men are equally Humanitas, an executioner killing a convict of murder is just "Humanitas correcting Humanitas because of an infraction of the laws of Humanitas". Envy is just "an admiration that fights for Humanitas against Humanitas", and thus, "war being the grand function of humankind, all the pugnacious feelings are the most adequate to happiness. From this, I came to the conclusion: envy is a virtue". If envy is a virtue, then cynicism, vanity and egoism are legitimated. Assis, through an ingenious fallacy, implied that envy is positive, in the same way many theories could "prove" true something clearly absurd looking through today's eyes.

== Reception ==
In an article in The Guardian, Woody Allen listed the work as one of his favorites. He said in an interview with the newspaper:

I just got this in the mail one day. Some stranger in Brazil sent it and wrote, "You'll like this". Because it's a thin book, I read it. If it had been a thick book, I would have discarded it. I was shocked by how charming and amusing it was. I couldn't believe he lived as long ago as he did. You would've thought he wrote it yesterday. It's so modern and so amusing. It's a very, very original piece of work. It rang a bell in me, in the same way that The Catcher in the Rye did. It was about subject matter that I liked and it was treated with great wit, great originality and no sentimentality.

In The New York Times, Parul Sehgal praised the book's new release with a new translation, also praising its irony and charm, while asking the readers "Is it possible that the most modern, most startlingly avant-garde novel to appear this year was originally published in 1881?". In the same 2020 release, Dave Eggers from The New Yorker defined the book as "one of the wittiest, most playful, and therefore most alive and ageless books ever written".

== Translations ==
There have been multiple translations. It was first translated into English in 1952 as Epitaph of a Small Winner by William L. Grossman. In 1997, it was translated as The Posthumous Memoirs of Brás Cubas by Gregory Rabassa. In 2020, there were two new translations, by Flora Thomson-DeVeaux (Penguin Classics) and Margaret Jull Costa and Robin Patterson (Liveright). The New York Times named Jull Costa and Patterson's translation "the superior translation" (Parul Sehgal, The New York Times).
