= Hip hip hooray =

Cheer to express congratulation

Hip, Hip, Hurrah! by Peder Severin Krøyer (1888)

Hip hip hooray, also hippity hip hooray; hooray may also be spelled and pronounced hoorah, hurrah, hurray etc., is a cheer called out to express congratulation toward someone or something, in the English-speaking world and elsewhere, usually given three times.

By a sole speaker, it is a form of interjection. In a group, it takes the form of call and response: the cheer is initiated by one person exclaiming "Three cheers for...[someone or something]" (or, more archaically, "Three times three"), then calling out "hip hip" (archaically, "hip hip hip") three times, each time being responded by "hooray" or "hurrah".

The cheer continues to be used to express congratulations. In Australia, New Zealand, South Africa, and the United Kingdom, the cheer is usually expressed after the singing of "Happy Birthday to You". In Canada and the United Kingdom, the cheer has been used to greet and salute the monarch at public events.

== History ==
The call was recorded in England in the beginning of the 19th century in connection with making a toast. Eighteenth century dictionaries list "Hip" as an attention-getting interjection, and in an example from 1790 it is repeated. "Hip-hip" was added as a preparatory call before making a toast or cheer in the early 19th century, probably after 1806. By 1813, it had reached its modern form, hip-hip-hurrah.

It has been suggested that the word "hip" stems from a medieval Latin acronym, "Hierosolyma Est Perdita", meaning "Jerusalem is lost", a term that gained notoriety in the German Hep hep riots of August to October 1819. Cornell's Michael Fontaine disputes this etymology, tracing it to a single letter in an English newspaper published August 28, 1819, some weeks after the riots. He concludes that the "acrostic interpretation ... has no basis in fact." Ritchie Robertson also disputes the "folk etymology" of the acronym interpretation, citing Jacob Katz.

One theory about the origin of "hurrah" is that the Europeans picked up the Mongol exclamation "hooray" as an enthusiastic cry of bravado and mutual encouragement. See Jack Weatherford's book Genghis Khan and the Making of the Modern World.

== See also ==
- Huzzah
