= Indian Givers: How the Indians of the Americas Transformed the World =

1988 book by Jack Weatherford

Cover of Indian Givers: How the Indians of the Americas Transformed the World

Indian Givers: How the Indians of the Americas Transformed the World is a 1988 non-fiction book by American author Jack Weatherford. The book explains the many ways in which the various peoples native to North and South America contributed to the modern world's culture, manufacturing, medicine, markets, and other aspects of modern life.

== Book summary ==
Jack Weatherford explains how the peoples of the Americas have been studied in isolation, and seeks to explore the contributions of Native Americans to the modern world.

He first discusses silver, and its relationship to early manufacturing and to capitalism. He states that our modern monetary economy was partially enabled by the discovery and exploitation of large New World gold and silver reserves, particularly Cerro Rico, a large mountain in Bolivia that contained as much as 85% of all silver ever found in the Americas.

Indian Givers next turns to Native American contributions to agriculture. Native Americans domesticated corn, beans, potatoes, tomatoes, peppers, and many other plants. These crops were introduced to Europe and the rest of the world as a result of the Columbian exchange, contributing to significant changes in food production and the culinary arts in the Old World.

Thirdly, the author makes the case that the United States Constitution was directly influenced by the Iroquois Confederacy, and that many ideas of the Age of Enlightenment were simply observations of the Pre-Columbian peoples in operation in the "natural state".

Fourthly, pre-contact peoples mastered the art of medicine and human biology. They had figured out how to use many plants to make medicines, deal with injury, and for other uses, such as making rubber. Indigenous pharmacology was the most advanced in the world, with alkaloids such as quinine well known by Native South Americans ahead of Europeans or other nations. Mind-altering and addictive drugs were heavily regulated by the various societies, being used only for religious purposes.

Lastly, Indians were great city planners and road builders, with outstanding road networks such as the Qhapaq Ñan, but much of what was built by the Indians was destroyed by the Conquistadors. Finally, the author wonders what has been lost, and gives a brief overview of how the Europeans were so able to conquer the equally advanced civilizations they found on the American continents.

== Reception ==
Gloria Steinem urged readers to read the book by Jack Weatherford and explained that it details the contributions which Native Americans made to agriculture, modern medicine and governmental institutions, often overlooked and not taught in the USA.

== See also ==
- Archaeology of the Americas
- Columbian Exchange
- European colonization of the Americas
- Indigenous peoples of the Americas
- Indian massacres
- Population history of American indigenous peoples

=== Related books ===
- 1491: New Revelations of the Americas Before Columbus by Charles C. Mann
- Before the Revolution: America's Ancient Pasts by Daniel K. Richter
