= Before the Revolution (book) =

2013 history book by Daniel K. Richter

Before the Revolution: America's Ancient Pasts
- 1st edition book cover
- Author: Daniel K. Richter
- Language: English
- Subject: History (1600-1775)
- Genre: Non-fiction
- Set in: 15th - 18th century North America
- Publisher: Belknap Press
- Publication date: May 13, 2013
- Publication place: United States

Before the Revolution: America's Ancient Pasts is a nonfiction book-length scholarly history written by Daniel K. Richter and published by Belknap Press (of Harvard University Press) in May 2013. It covers the stages of North America's deep historical roots well before the American Revolution, theorizing that these stages shaped recent history and the present. The book is divided into six major sections: "Progenitors," "Conquistadors," "Traders," "Planters," "Imperialists," and "Atlanteans".

== Author ==
Daniel K. Richter is a professor of American history at the University of Pennsylvania and book author. He researches, teaches, and writes about colonial North America and Native American history before 1800. He served as acting chair for UPenn's History Department during 2013–2014. His PhD is from Columbia University.

== See also ==
- List of pre-Columbian cultures
- Metallurgy in pre-Columbian America
- Pre-Columbian trans-oceanic contact
- Population history of indigenous peoples of the Americas
- Archaeology of the Americas
- Columbian Exchange
- European colonization of the Americas
- Forest gardening
- Indian massacres

=== Related books ===
- 1491: New Revelations of the Americas Before Columbus authored by Charles C. Mann
- Indian Givers: How the Indians of the Americas Transformed the World authored by Jack Weatherford.
