= The Secret History of the Mongol Queens =

2010 book by Jack Weatherford

The Secret History of the Mongol Queens: How the Daughters of Genghis Khan Rescued His Empire
- Front cover of the book depicting the Mongol queen, Mandukhai the Wise, at war.
- Author: Jack Weatherford
- Illustrator: N. Bat-Erdene
- Cover artist: Yuji Kikutake
- Language: English
- Subject: Asian history
- Genre: History
- Publisher: Crown
- Publication date: 2010
- Publication place: United States
- Pages: 318
- ISBN: 978-0-307-40715-3
- Preceded by: Genghis Khan and the Making of the Modern World

The Secret History of the Mongol Queens: How the Daughters of Genghis Khan Rescued His Empire is a 2010 book by Jack Weatherford, about the impact and legacy of Genghis Khan's daughters and Mongol queens such as Mandukhai the Wise and Khutulun. The book references Mongolian, Central Asian, Persian, European and Chinese sources such as Altan Tobchi, Erdeni Tobchi, Erdenyin Tunamal Sudar, Tarikh-i-Rashidi, Tarikh-i Jahangushay-i Juvaini, and Ming shi in addition to various secondary sources in English, Mongolian, and German.

Weatherford also analyzes the role of Mongol women in the Mongol Empire and how they influenced the Mongol nation, modern Mongolia, and most of the modern world.

The book was translated into Mongolian, Chinese, Korean, Malaysian, Thai and Russian.

Chinese-American actress Joan Chen mentioned that she had read the book to prepare for her role as Chabi in the TV series Marco Polo.

== Contents ==
=== Introduction: The missing chapter ===
Weatherford suggests in the introduction that the unknown censor who deliberately cut away part of The Secret History of the Mongols did so in order to obscure Mongol women who became too powerful. Only a small part of the text written by Genghis Khan in 1206 when he was proclaimed Qaghan of the Mongols, remains: "Let us reward our female offspring". However, external sources yielded impressions of these women and their accomplishments.

The Persian chronicler Rashid al-Din wrote that "there are many stories about these daughters", and promised that "if the reader pays attention everything will be understood." Weatherford further suggests that traces of the Mongol queens have indirectly appeared in the diplomatic reports of the Chinese court, letters to the Vatican, Muslim histories, royal Armenian chronicles, the memoirs of merchants such as Marco Polo, texts carved into the stones of Taoist temples, and in the rhymes of Chaucer and the arias of Puccini.

=== Part 1: Tiger Queens of the Silk Route 1206–1241 ===
During his reign, Genghis Khan raised the status of women in positions of prominence, particularly his daughters and consorts. These women included his daughter Altani, who was awarded the title of "Ba'atur"("Hero"), when she saved the life of his youngest son Tolui. This title was given to successful military and political figures in the Mongol Empire.

His daughters played crucial roles in Khan's diplomacy and warfare. They married the leaders of the powerful tribes and nations surrounding the Mongols such as the Ongud, Uyghurs and Oirats, becoming diplomatic shields in all directions, cementing his alliances. The daughters of Genghis Khan came to control the Silk Route and assisted his campaigns in China and Persia. The Mongol women proved adept at administrating their territory and fighting alongside men on foreign conquests.

After the death of Genghis Khan in 1227, his successors quickly neglected Khan's legacy. His son, Ögedei, purged his female relatives in order to consolidate his power over the Borjigin clan, including using a mass rape of four thousand Oirat girls in 1237 to cow Oirat into submission and take their lands after Ögedei's sister Checheyigen had died, and allegedly arranging the assassination of Genghis Khan's favorite daughter, Altalun, who was ruler of the Uyghur territory.

=== Part 2: The Shattered Jade Realm 1242–1470 ===
The cover of The Secret History of the Mongol Great Khatuns in Mongolian 2009.

Following Ögedei's death, khatuns (queens) briefly ruled the Mongol Empire. Most of these women were not Genghis Khan's daughters, but his daughters- or granddaughters-in-law. Their ability to control the empire made them the most powerful women during this period. Succession struggles with male kinsmen, including their sons and brothers-in-law, meant the khatun were quickly diminished.

Khutulun, daughter of Kaidu and granddaughter of Ögedei, was the last of the Mongol women who held real power and resisted their male lines. Noted for her beauty, she also mastered the three main sports of Mongolia – Mongolian wrestling, horse racing and archery – and was famed for defeating men in both the battlefield and the wrestling match. When she died in 1306, the Borjigin men gained control of the whole Mongol Empire without any resistance from their female relatives. Only Mongol princesses who married Goryeo kings in Korea continued the queens' traditions in a small scale. A story from Khutulun's life is featured in Italian composer Giacomo Puccini's Turandot.

In the late 14th century, the Mongol Qaghan Elbeg made a fatal mistake. He killed his blood brother in order to marry his wife, Oljei the Beauty, and ignored the Mongol tradition that a man is forbidden to forcefully take a woman in marriage. In 1399, Elbeg was killed by the Oirats after the marriage created tension between the Mongol tribes in Mongolia.

When the male descendants of Genghis Khan became prisoners or puppets of other nations such as Alans and Kipchaks, the Mongol queens tried to save them from captivity. Samur, khatun of the Four Oirats and daughter of Elbeg Khan, was the most prominent. Her grandson, Esen, defeated rival Mongol warlords and a threat from the Chinese. However, he was unable to consolidate his power and he quickly lost support from his allies including his grandmother, Samur. Esen turned against Samur's clan, nearly destroying every male of Genghis Khan's line. When Esen's daughter gave birth to a son, Bayan-Möngke, one of the last direct descendants of Khan, Samur and the child's mother successfully managed keep the child in hiding. Both Samur and Esen died soon afterward, leaving a void in power.

=== Part 3: Wolf Mother 1470–1509 ===
With the death of Samur, the strong Mongol queens did not perish from history. Instead, a new Mongol princess, Mandukhai, was born in 1448. She was later married to Manduul Khan, who restored the empire in Mongolia.

In order to keep an eye on the Mongolian Hagan Manduul, Turkic warlord Beg Arslan from Hami Oasis had him married to his daughter. When they did not produce a child, Manduul took Mandukhai as his wife. While Bayan-Möngke, who had been saved by Samur as an infant, quickly emerged as Manduul's preferred successor, Une-Bolad, an experienced and powerful warlord descended from Genghis Khan's brother Hasar, appeared as a contender of the throne. Driven from Manduul, Bayan-Möngke died in the Gobi desert.

When her husband died in 1478, Mandukhai had the choice of marrying Une-Bolad or taking the Mongols to Ming Dynasty to be vassals. Instead, Mandukhai elected to rule instead and recovered Batumöngke, the missing son of Bayan-Möngke, to ascend the throne at the royal shrine kept by the Chahar with the title Dayan Khan. Because Dayan Khan was a child at the time of his ascension, Mandukhai became the empire's de facto ruler while simultaneously raising Dayan Khan to become an effective ruler. Together, they united the entire Mongols, restoring order.

By the time Mandukhai died in 1509, the Mongol nation stretched from the Siberian tundra and Lake Baikal in the north, across the Gobi, beyond the Yellow River into the Ordos. The lands extended from the forests of Manchuria in the East past the Altai Mountains and out onto the steppes of Central Asia.

=== Epilogue: The Secret of History ===
Weatherford says the censors' cuts only hampered the ability to understand the Mongol queens' place in history, but did not erase it entirely. The Mongol queens, particularly Mandukhai, are honored by the Mongol nation alongside Genghis Khan.
