= Genghis Khan and the Quest for God =

2016 nonfiction book by Jack Weatherford

- Author: Jack Weatherford
- Language: English
- Subject: Genghis Khan, Religious freedom, Mongol Empire
- Publisher: Viking Press
- Publication date: October 25, 2016
- Publication place: United States
- Media type: Print (Hardcover), eBook
- Pages: 432
- ISBN: 978-0735221154

Genghis Khan and the Quest for God: How the World's Greatest Conqueror Gave Us Religious Freedom is a 2016 non‑fiction book by American anthropologist Jack Weatherford, published by Viking Press.

== Synopsis ==
The book covers Genghis Khan’s rise to power and governance, and theorizes that his tolerant policies on religion in the Mongol Empire influenced modern concepts of religious freedom.

== Reception ==
The book received mixed to positive reviews from critics, who praised its general handling of Mongol history but criticized its analysis of religious tolerance in modern history. Publishers Weekly wrote that it "is an interesting overview of some of the religious dynamics of the Mongolian empire in the 13th century but will leave readers looking for in-depth analysis wanting." Peter Gordon of the Asian Review of Books gave the book a mixed review, praising its overview of Mongol history but writing that Weatherford's "attempt to link 13th-century steppe practices with 18th-century American thought is interesting, it perhaps does a disservice to both."

Thomas Ficarra, in a review for the Army University Press, wrote that "The book not only keeps the reader involved with Temujin’s humble beginnings, but it also does an excellent job putting his experiences in historical context. Kirkus Reviews also gave the book a positive review, describing it as "An intriguing, eye-opening spiritual biography."
