= Pre-Columbian era =

The Americas prior to European influence

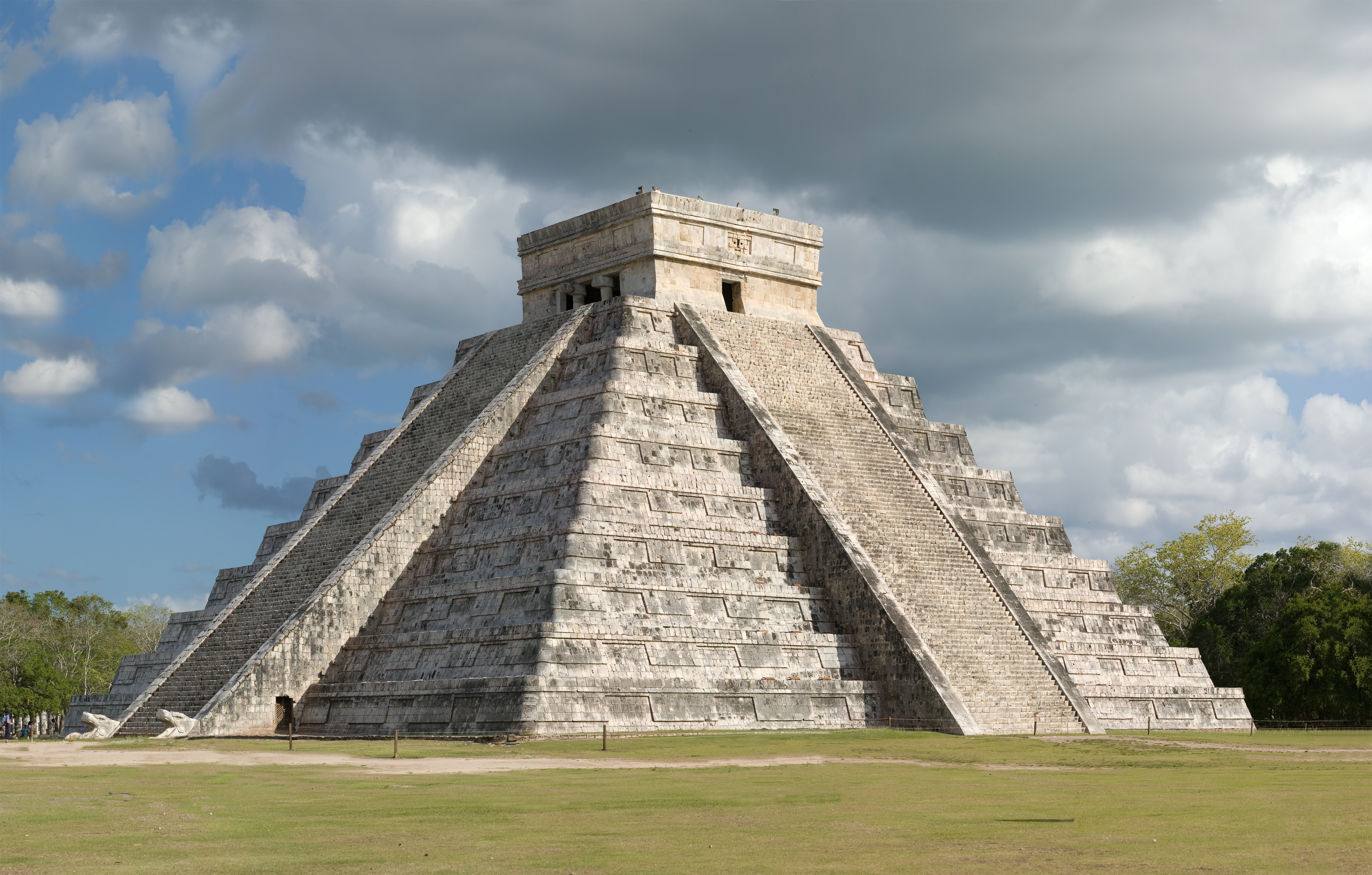
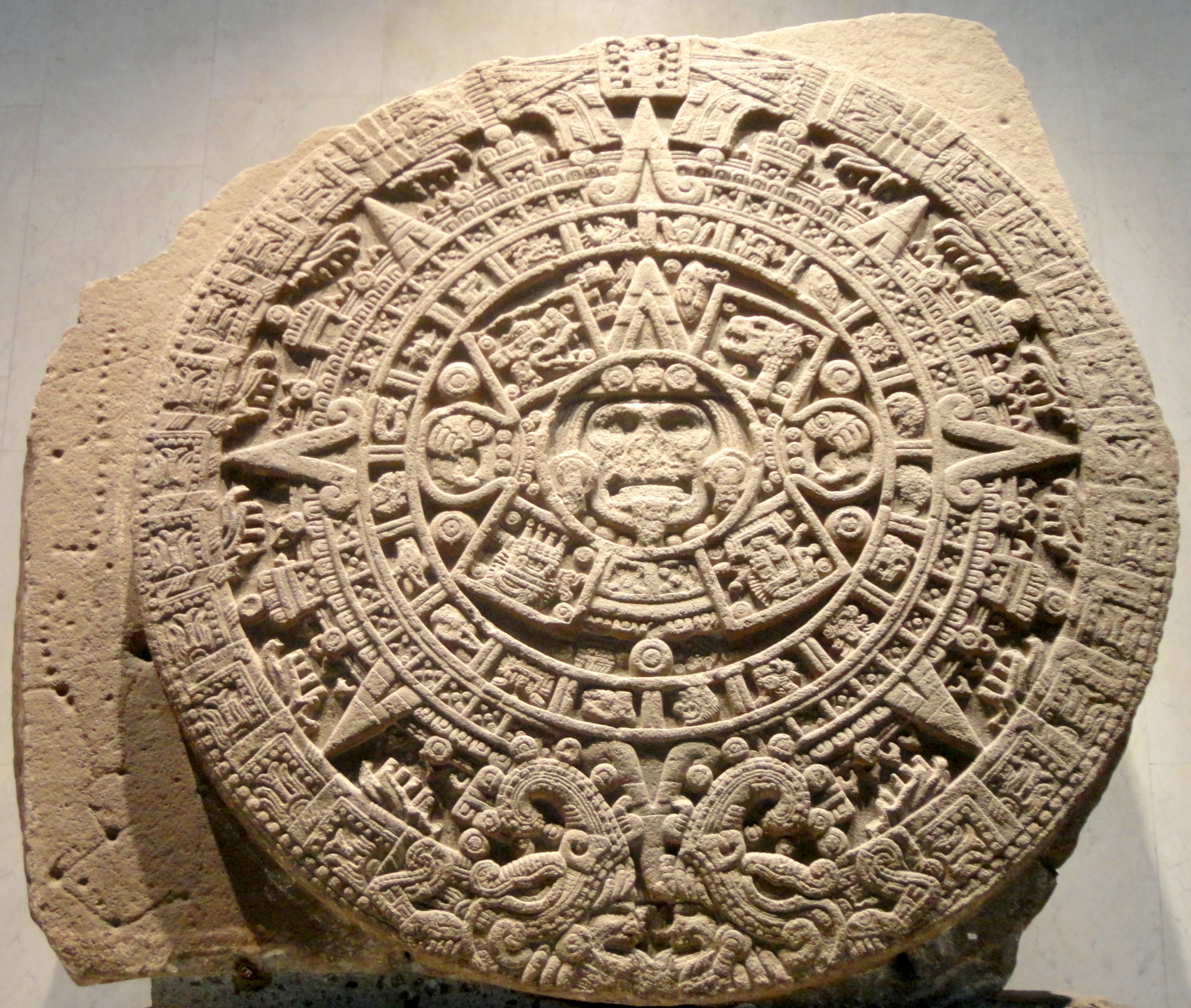
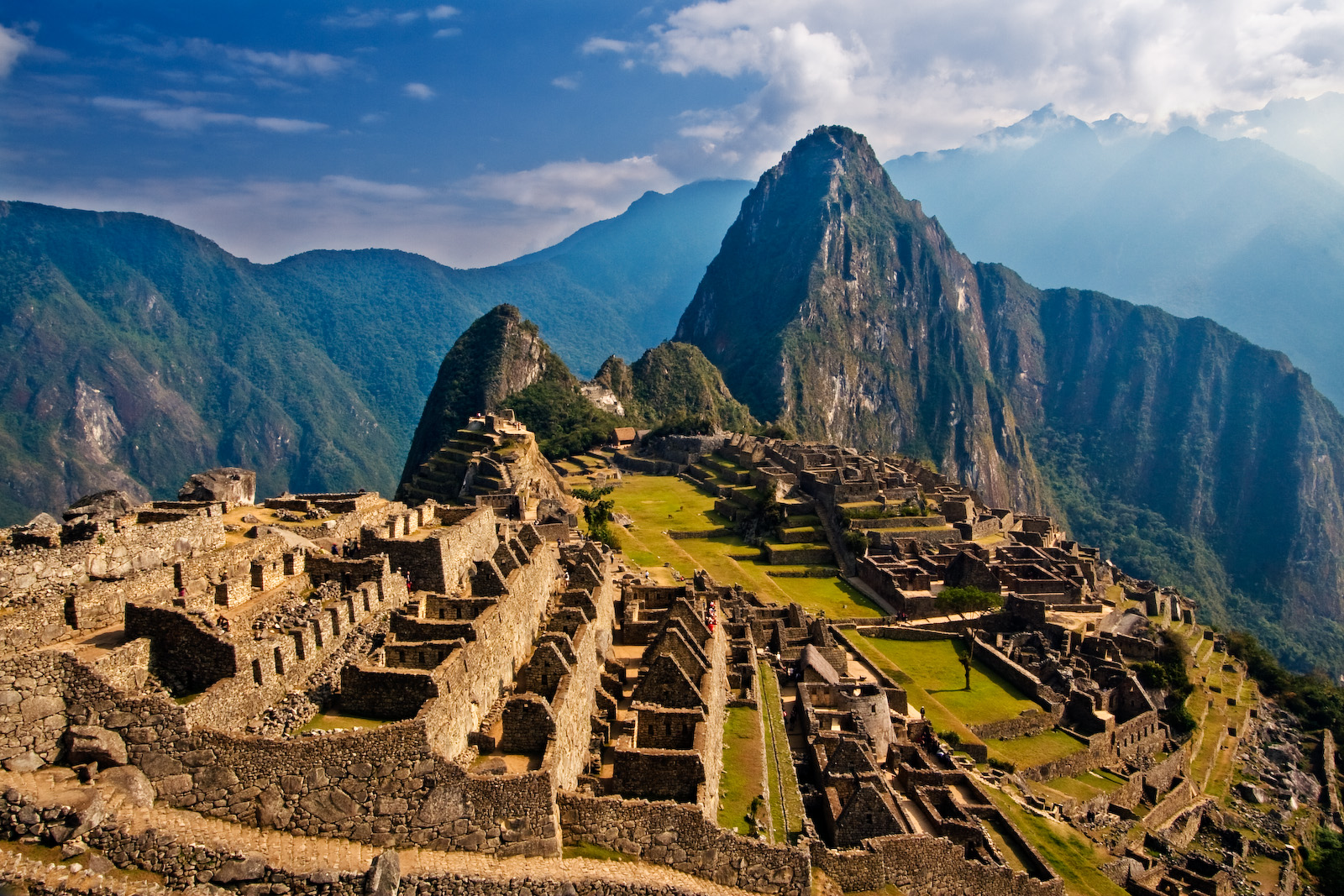
The Mayan Temple of Kukulcán (top), the Aztec sun stone (middle) and the Inca city of Machu Picchu (bottom) are amongst the longest standing objects by pre-Columbian civilizations.

In the history of the Americas, pre-Columbian era, also known as pre-contact era, pre-Hispanic or as pre-Cabraline era (the latter specifically framed in Brazil), spans from the initial peopling of the Americas in the Upper Paleolithic to the onset of European colonization, which began with Christopher Columbus's voyage in 1492. This era encompasses the history of Indigenous cultures prior to significant European influence, which in some cases did not occur until decades or even centuries after Columbus's arrival.

During the pre-Columbian era, many civilizations developed permanent settlements, cities, agricultural practices, civic and monumental architecture, major earthworks, and complex societal hierarchies. Some of these civilizations had declined by the time of the establishment of the first permanent European colonies, around the late 16th to early 17th centuries, and are known primarily through archaeological research of the Americas and oral histories. Other civilizations, contemporaneous with the colonial period, were documented in European accounts of the time. For instance, the Maya civilization maintained written records, which were often destroyed by Christian Europeans such as Diego de Landa, who viewed them as pagan but sought to preserve native histories. Despite the destruction, a few original documents have survived, and others were transcribed or translated into Spanish, providing modern historians with valuable insights into ancient cultures and knowledge.

== Historiography ==
Before the development of archaeology in the 19th century, historians of the pre-Columbian period mainly interpreted the records of the European conquerors and the accounts of early European travelers and antiquaries. It was not until the nineteenth century that the work of people such as John Lloyd Stephens, Eduard Seler, and Alfred Maudslay, and institutions such as the Peabody Museum of Archaeology and Ethnology of Harvard University, led to the reconsideration and criticism of the early European sources. Now, the scholarly study of pre-Columbian cultures is most often based on scientific and multidisciplinary methodologies.

== Genetics ==
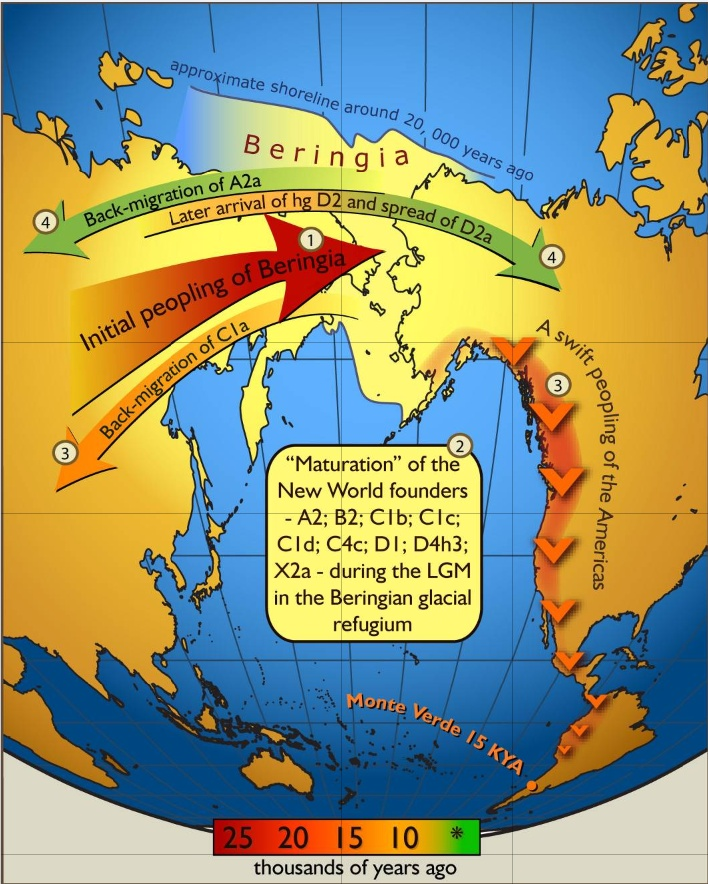
Schematic illustration of maternal (mtDNA) gene-flow in and out of Beringia, from 25,000 years ago to present

The haplogroup most commonly associated with Indigenous Amerindian genetics is Y-chromosome haplogroup Q1a3a. Researchers have found genetic evidence that the Q1a3a haplogroup has been in South America for at least 18,000 years. Y-chromosome DNA, like mtDNA, differs from other nuclear chromosomes in that the majority of the Y-chromosome is unique and does not recombine during meiosis. This has the effect that the historical pattern of mutations can easily be studied. The pattern indicates Indigenous peoples of the Americas experienced two very distinctive genetic episodes: first with the initial peopling of the Americas and second with European colonization of the Americas. The former is the determinant factor for the number of gene lineages and founding haplotypes present in today's Indigenous populations.

Human settlement of the Americas occurred in stages from the Bering Sea coastline, with an initial 20,000-year layover on Beringia for the founding population. The microsatellite diversity and distributions of the Y lineage specific to South America indicate that certain Amerindian populations have been isolated since the initial colonization of the region. The Na-Dené, Inuit, and Indigenous Alaskan populations exhibit haplogroup Q-M242 (Y-DNA) mutations, however, and are distinct from other Indigenous peoples with various mtDNA mutations. This suggests that the earliest migrants into the northern extremes of North America and Greenland derived from later populations.

== Peopling of the Americas ==
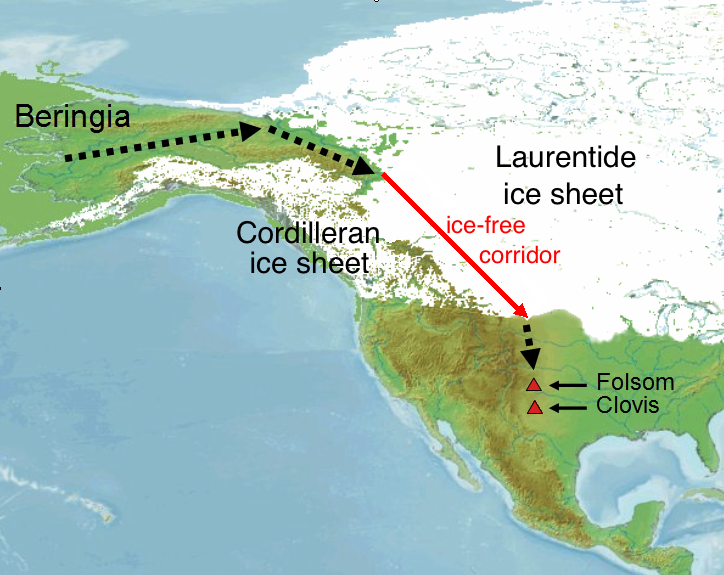
Approximate location of the ice-free corridor and specific Paleoindian sites, according to the Clovis theory

Asian nomadic Paleo-Indians are thought to have entered the Americas via the Bering Land Bridge (Beringia), now the Bering Strait, and possibly along the coast. Genetic evidence found in Indigenous peoples' maternally inherited mitochondrial DNA (mtDNA) supports the theory of multiple genetic populations migrating from Asia. After crossing the land bridge, they moved southward along the Pacific coast and through an interior ice-free corridor. Throughout millennia, Paleo-Indians spread throughout the rest of North and South America. Genomic research indicates that the initial peopling of South America involved at least three major population dispersals, followed by regional differentiation, episodes of population replacement, and long-term genetic continuity in some populations.

Exactly when the first people migrated into the Americas is the subject of much debate. One of the earliest identifiable cultures was the Clovis culture, with sites dating from some 13,000 years ago. However, older sites dating back to 20,000 years ago have been claimed. Some genetic studies estimate the colonization of the Americas dates from between 40,000 and 13,000 years ago. The chronology of migration models is currently divided into two general approaches. The first is the short chronology theory with the first movement beyond Alaska into the Americas occurring no earlier than 14,000–17,000 years ago, followed by successive waves of immigrants. The second belief is the long chronology theory, which proposes that the first group of people entered the hemisphere at a much earlier date, possibly 30,000–40,000 years ago or earlier.

Artifacts have been found in both North and South America which have been dated to 14,000 years ago, and accordingly humans have been proposed to have reached Cape Horn at the southern tip of South America by this time. In that case, the people that would become the Inuit would have arrived separately and at a much later date, probably no more than 2,000 years ago, moving across the ice from Siberia into Alaska.

Major peoples and cultural areas of the pre-Columbian Americas

== North America ==
=== Lithic and Archaic periods ===
The North American climate was unstable as the ice age receded during the Lithic stage. It finally stabilized about 10,000 years ago; climatic conditions were then very similar to today's. Within this time frame, roughly about the Archaic Period, numerous archaeological cultures have been identified.

==== Lithic stage and early Archaic period ====
The unstable climate led to widespread migration, with early Paleo-Indians soon spreading throughout the Americas, diversifying into many hundreds of culturally distinct tribes. The Paleo-Indians were hunter-gatherers, likely characterized by small, mobile bands consisting of approximately 20 to 50 members of an extended family. These groups moved from place to place as preferred resources were depleted and new supplies were sought. During much of the Paleo-Indian period, bands are thought to have subsisted primarily through hunting now-extinct giant land animals such as mastodon and ancient bison. Paleo-Indian groups carried a variety of tools, including distinctive projectile points and knives, as well as less distinctive butchering and hide-scraping implements.

The vastness of the North American continent, and the variety of its climates, ecology, vegetation, fauna, and landforms, led ancient peoples to coalesce into many distinct linguistic and cultural groups. This is reflected in the oral histories of the indigenous peoples, described by a wide range of traditional creation stories which often say that a given people have been living in a certain territory since the creation of the world.

Throughout thousands of years, paleo-Indian people domesticated, bred, and cultivated many plant species, including crops that now constitute 50–60% of worldwide agriculture. In general, Arctic, Subarctic, and coastal peoples continued to live as hunters and gatherers, while agriculture was adopted in more temperate and sheltered regions, permitting a dramatic rise in population.

==== Middle Archaic period ====
After the migration or migrations, it was several thousand years before the first complex societies arose, the earliest emerging about seven to eight thousand years ago. As early as 5500 BCE, people in the Lower Mississippi Valley at Monte Sano and other sites in present-day Louisiana, Mississippi, and Florida were building complex earthwork mounds, probably for religious purposes. Beginning in the late twentieth century, archeologists have studied, analyzed, and dated these sites, realizing that the earliest complexes were built by hunter-gatherer societies, whose people occupied the sites on a seasonal basis. Watson Brake, a large complex of eleven platform mounds, was constructed beginning in 3400 BCE and added to over 500 years. This has changed earlier assumptions that complex construction arose only after societies had adopted agriculture, and become sedentary, with stratified hierarchy and usually ceramics. These ancient people had organized to build complex mound projects under a different social structure.

==== Late Archaic period ====
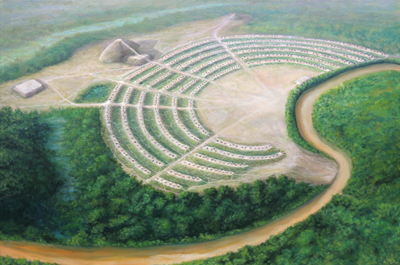
Artist's reconstruction of Poverty Point, 1500 BCE

Until the accurate dating of Watson Brake and similar sites, the oldest mound complex was thought to be Poverty Point, also located in the Lower Mississippi Valley. Built about 1500 BCE, it is the centerpiece of a culture extending over 100 sites on both sides of the Mississippi. The Poverty Point site has earthworks in the form of six concentric half-circles, divided by radial aisles, together with some mounds. The entire complex is nearly a mile across.

Mound building was continued by succeeding cultures, who built numerous sites in the middle Mississippi and Ohio River valleys as well, adding effigy mounds, conical and ridge mounds, and other shapes.

=== Woodland period ===
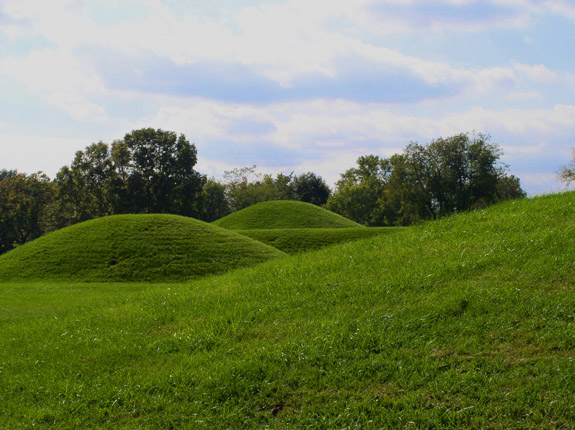
Hopewell mounds from the Mound City group in Ohio

The Woodland period of North American pre-Columbian cultures lasted from roughly 1000 BCE to 1000 CE. The term was coined in the 1930s and refers to prehistoric sites between the Archaic period and the Mississippian cultures. The Adena culture and the ensuing Hopewell tradition during this period built monumental earthwork architecture and established continent-spanning trade and exchange networks.

This period is considered a developmental stage without any massive changes in a short period but instead has a continuous development in stone and bone tools, leatherworking, textile manufacture, tool production, cultivation, and shelter construction. Some Woodland people continued to use spears and atlatls until the end of the period when they were replaced by bows and arrows.

=== Mississippian culture ===
The Mississippian culture was spread across the Southeast and Midwest of what is today the United States, from the Atlantic coast to the edge of the plains, from the Gulf of Mexico to the Upper Midwest, although most intensively in the area along the Mississippi River and Ohio River. One of the distinguishing features of this culture was the construction of complexes of large earthen mounds and grand plazas, continuing the mound-building traditions of earlier cultures. They grew maize and other crops intensively, participated in an extensive trade network, and had a complex stratified society. The Mississippians first appeared around 1000 CE, following and developing out of the less agriculturally intensive and less centralized Woodland period. The largest urban site of these people, Cahokia—located near modern East St. Louis, Illinois—may have reached a population of over 20,000. Other chiefdoms were constructed throughout the Southeast, and its trade networks reached to the Great Lakes and the Gulf of Mexico. At its peak, between the 12th and 13th centuries, Cahokia was the most populous city in North America. (Larger cities did exist in Mesoamerica and the Andes.) Monks Mound, the major ceremonial center of Cahokia, remains the largest earthen construction of the prehistoric Americas. The culture reached its peak in about 1200–1400 CE, and in most places, it seems to have been in decline before the arrival of Europeans.

Many Mississippian peoples were encountered by the expedition of Hernando de Soto in the 1540s, with disastrous results for both sides. Unlike the Spanish expeditions in Mesoamerica, which conquered vast empires with relatively few men and acceptable Spanish casualties for the era, the de Soto expedition wandered the American Southeast for four years, becoming bedraggled, losing men and equipment, and eventually arriving in Mexico as a fraction of its original size. The Mississippians fared even worse, as the fatalities of diseases introduced by the expedition devastated the populations and produced much social disruption. By the time Europeans returned a hundred years later, nearly all of the Mississippian groups had vanished, and vast swaths of their territory were virtually uninhabited.

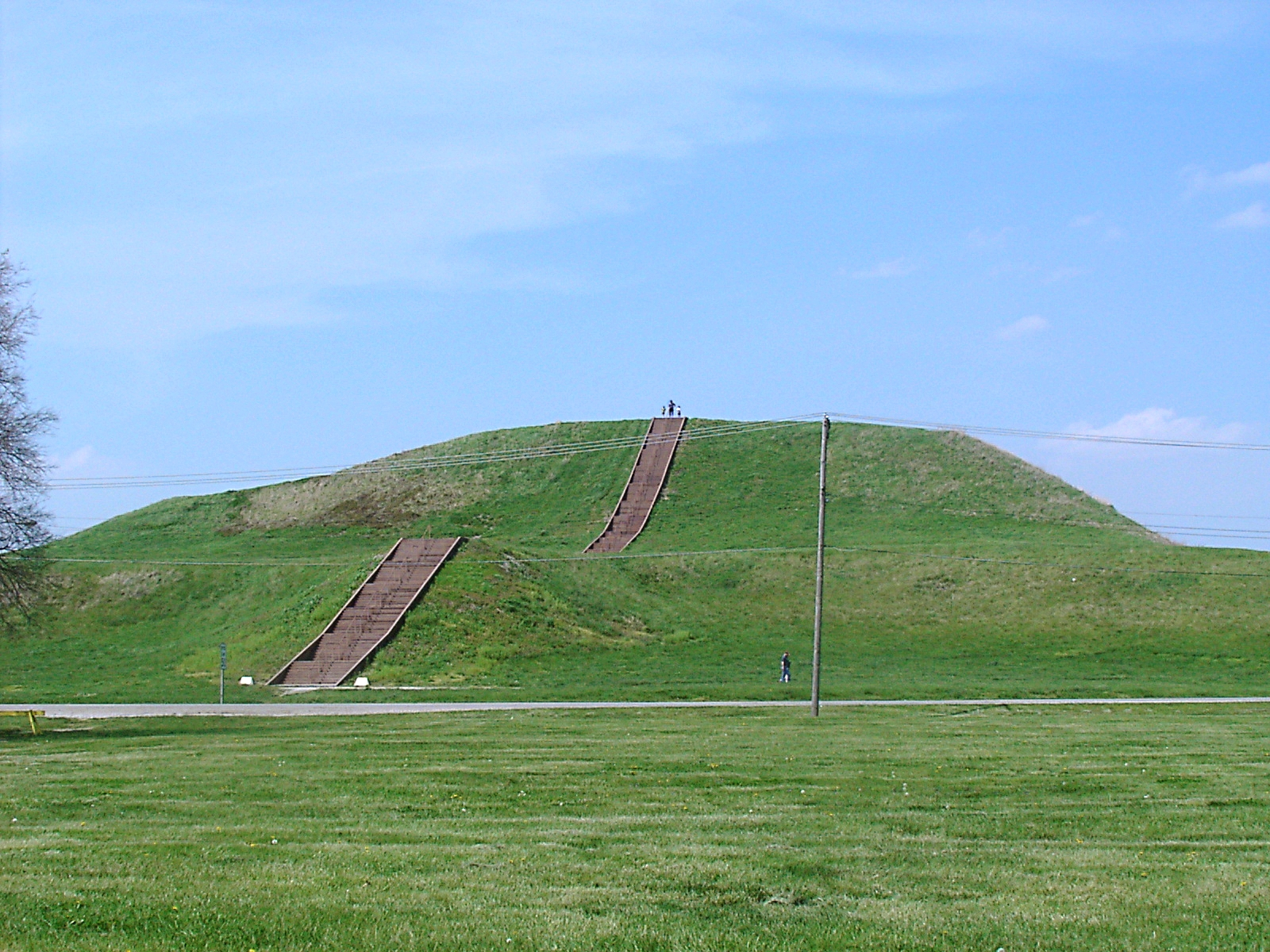
Monks Mound of Cahokia in summer. The concrete staircase follows the approximate course of the ancient wooden stairs.

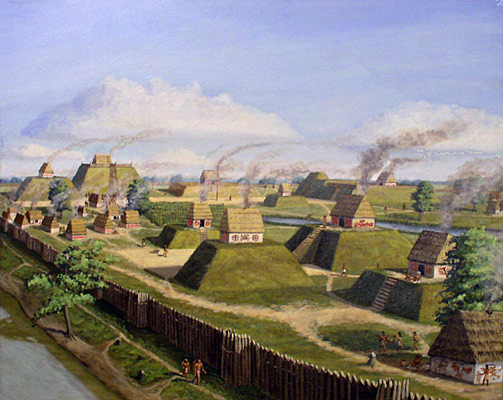
Artistic recreation of the Kincaid Mounds site from the prehistoric Mississippian culture as it may have looked at its peak 1050–1400 CE

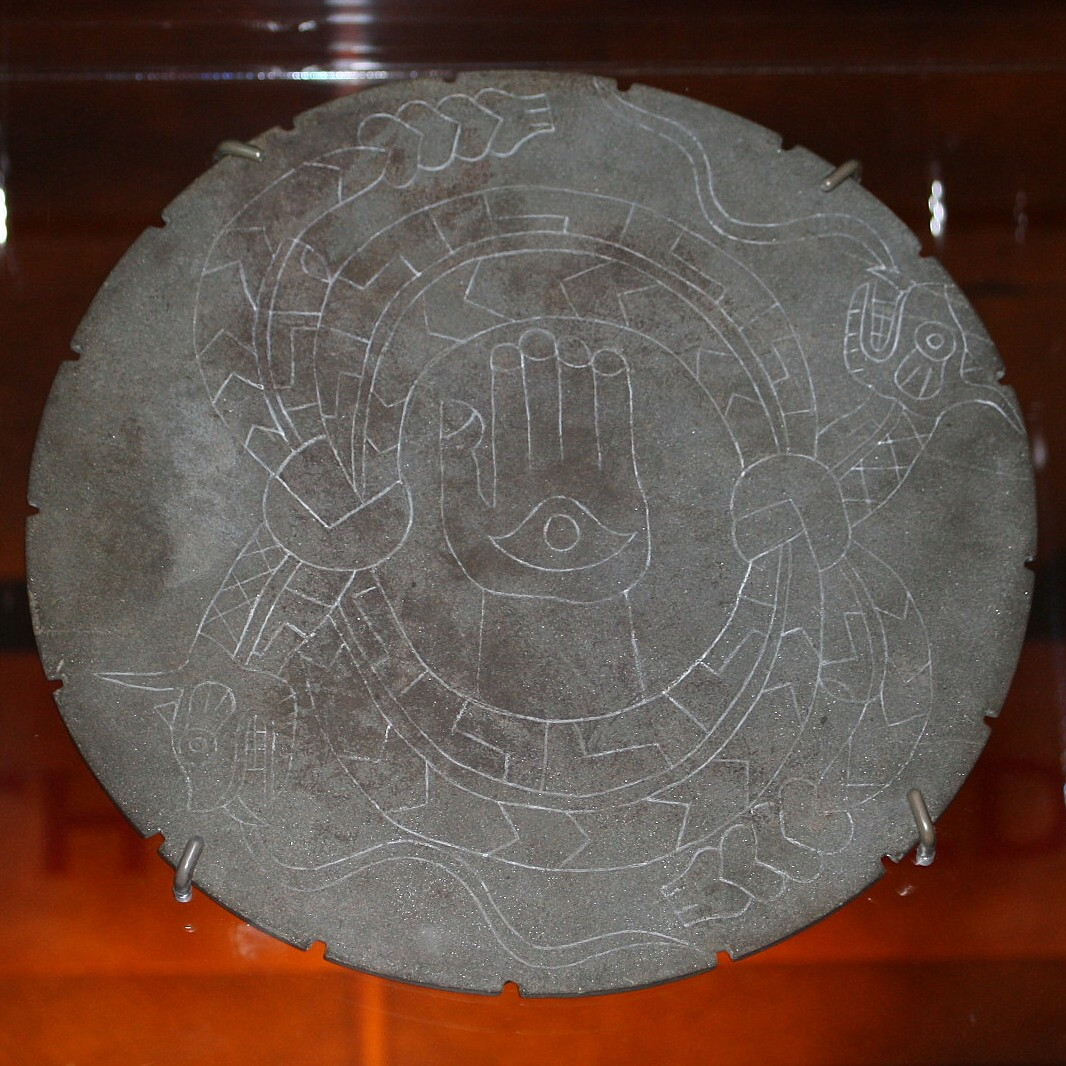
Engraved stone palette from Moundville, illustrating two horned rattlesnakes, perhaps referring to The Great Serpent of the Southeastern Ceremonial Complex

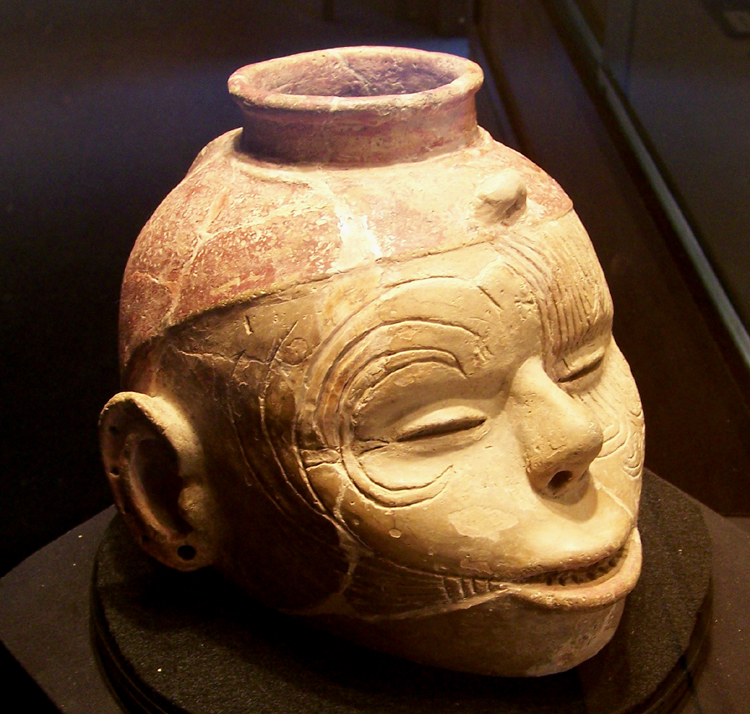
A human head effigy pot from the Nodena site

=== Ancestral Puebloans ===
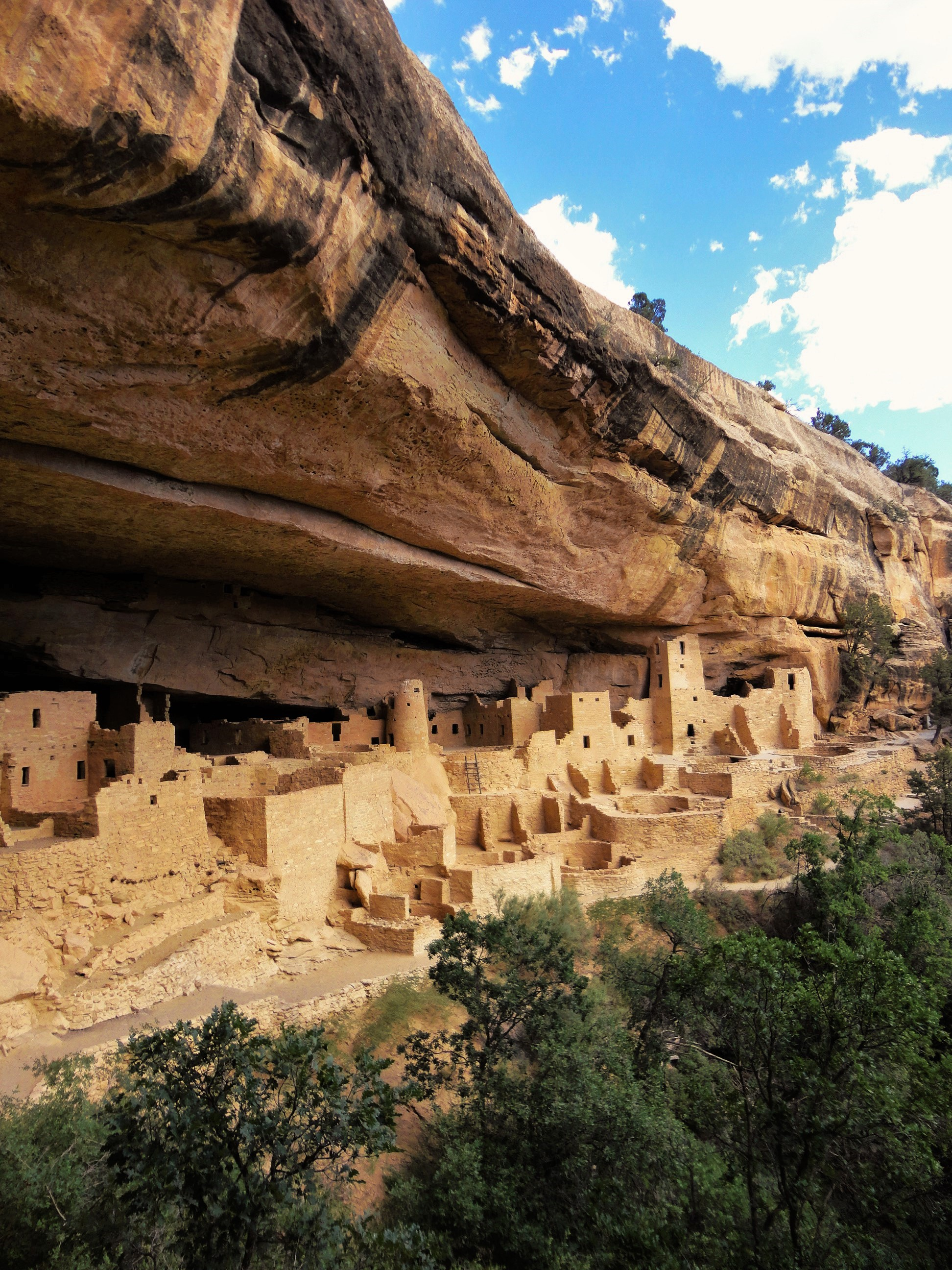
The Cliff Palace in Mesa Verde National Park, Colorado.

The Ancestral Puebloans thrived in what is now the Four Corners region in the United States. It is commonly suggested that the culture of the Ancestral Puebloans emerged during the Early Basketmaker II Era during the 12th century BCE. The Ancestral Puebloans were a complex Oasisamerican society that constructed kivas, multi-story houses, and apartment blocks made from stone and adobe, such as the Cliff Palace of Mesa Verde National Park in Colorado and the Great Houses in Chaco Canyon, New Mexico. The Puebloans also constructed a road system that stretched from Chaco Canyon to Kutz Canyon in the San Juan Basin. The Ancestral Puebloans are also known as "Anasazi", though the term is controversial, as the present-day Pueblo peoples consider the term to be derogatory, due to the word tracing its origins to a Navajo word meaning "ancestor enemies".

=== Hohokam ===
The Hohokam thrived in the Sonoran desert in what is now the U.S. state of Arizona and the Mexican state of Sonora. The Hohokam were responsible for the construction of a series of irrigation canals that led to the successful establishment of Phoenix, Arizona via the Salt River Project. The Hohokam also established complex settlements such as Snaketown, which served as an important commercial trading center. After 1375 CE, Hohokam society collapsed and the people abandoned their settlements, likely due to drought.

=== Mogollon ===
The Mogollon resided in the present-day states of Arizona, New Mexico, and Texas as well as Sonora and Chihuahua. Like most other cultures in Oasisamerica, the Mogollon constructed sophisticated kivas and cliff dwellings. In the village of Paquimé, the Mogollon are revealed to have housed pens for scarlet macaws, which were introduced from Mesoamerica through trade.

=== Sinagua ===
The Sinagua were hunter-gatherers and agriculturalists who lived in central Arizona. Like the Hohokam, they constructed kivas and great houses as well as ballcourts. Several of the Sinagua ruins include Montezuma Castle, Wupatki, and Tuzigoot.

=== Salado ===
The Salado resided in the Tonto Basin in southeastern Arizona from 1150 CE to the 15th century. Archaeological evidence suggests that they traded with far-away cultures, as evidenced by the presence of seashells from the Gulf of California and macaw feathers from Mexico. Most of the cliff dwellings constructed by the Salado are primarily located in Tonto National Monument.

=== Iroquois ===
The Iroquois League of Nations or "People of the Long House", or the Haudenosaunee Confederacy, was a politically advanced, democratic society. It is thought by some historians to have influenced the United States Constitution, with the Senate passing a resolution to this effect in 1988. Other historians have contested this interpretation and believe the impact was minimal or did not exist, pointing to numerous differences between the two systems and the ample precedents for the constitution in European political thought.

=== Calusa ===
The Calusa were a complex paramountcy/kingdom that resided in southern Florida. Instead of agriculture, the Calusa economy relied on abundant fishing. According to Spanish sources, the "king's house" at Mound Key was large enough to house 2,000 people. The Calusa ultimately collapsed into extinction at around 1750 after succumbing to diseases introduced by the Spanish colonists.

=== Wichita ===
The Wichita people were a loose confederation that consisted of sedentary agriculturalists and hunter-gatherers who resided in the eastern Great Plains. They lived in permanent settlements and even established a city called Etzanoa, which had a population of 20,000 people. The city was eventually abandoned around the 18th century after it was encountered by Spanish conquistadors Jusepe Gutierrez and Juan de Oñate.

=== Historic tribes ===
When the Europeans arrived, Indigenous peoples of North America had a wide range of lifeways from sedentary, agrarian societies to semi-nomadic hunter-gatherer societies. Many formed new tribes or confederations in response to European colonization. These are often classified by cultural regions, loosely based on geography. These can include the following:

- Arctic, including Aleut, Inuit, and Yupik peoples
- Subarctic
- Northeastern Woodlands
- Southeastern Woodlands
- Great Plains
- Great Basin
- Northwest Plateau
- Northwest Coast
- California
- Southwest

Numerous pre-Columbian societies were sedentary, such as the Tlingit, Haida, Chumash, Mandan, Hidatsa, and others, and some established large settlements, even cities, such as Cahokia, in what is now Illinois.

== Mesoamerica ==
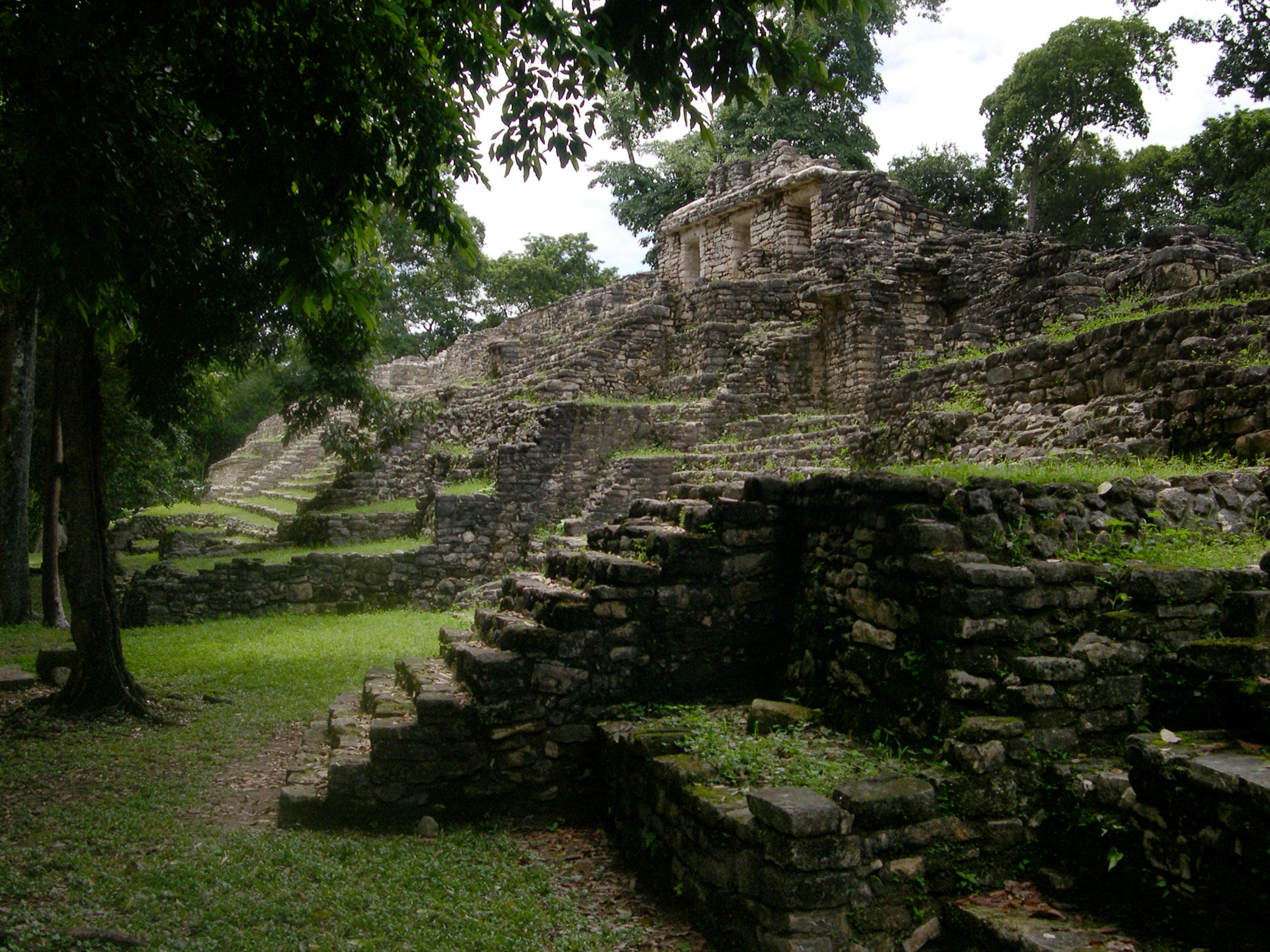
One of the pyramids in the upper level of Yaxchilán

Mesoamerica is the region extending from central Mexico south to the northwestern border of Costa Rica that gave rise to a group of stratified, culturally related agrarian civilizations spanning an approximately 3,000-year period before the visits to the Caribbean by Christopher Columbus. Mesoamerican is the adjective generally used to refer to that group of pre-Columbian cultures. This refers to an environmental area occupied by an assortment of ancient cultures that shared religious beliefs, art, architecture, and technology in the Americas for more than three thousand years. Between 2000 and 300 BCE, complex cultures began to form in Mesoamerica. Some matured into advanced pre-Columbian Mesoamerican civilizations such as the Olmec, Teotihuacan, Mayas, Zapotecs, Mixtecs, Huastecs, Purepecha, Toltecs, and Mexica/Aztecs. The Mexica civilization is also known as the Aztec Triple Alliance since they were three smaller kingdoms loosely united together.

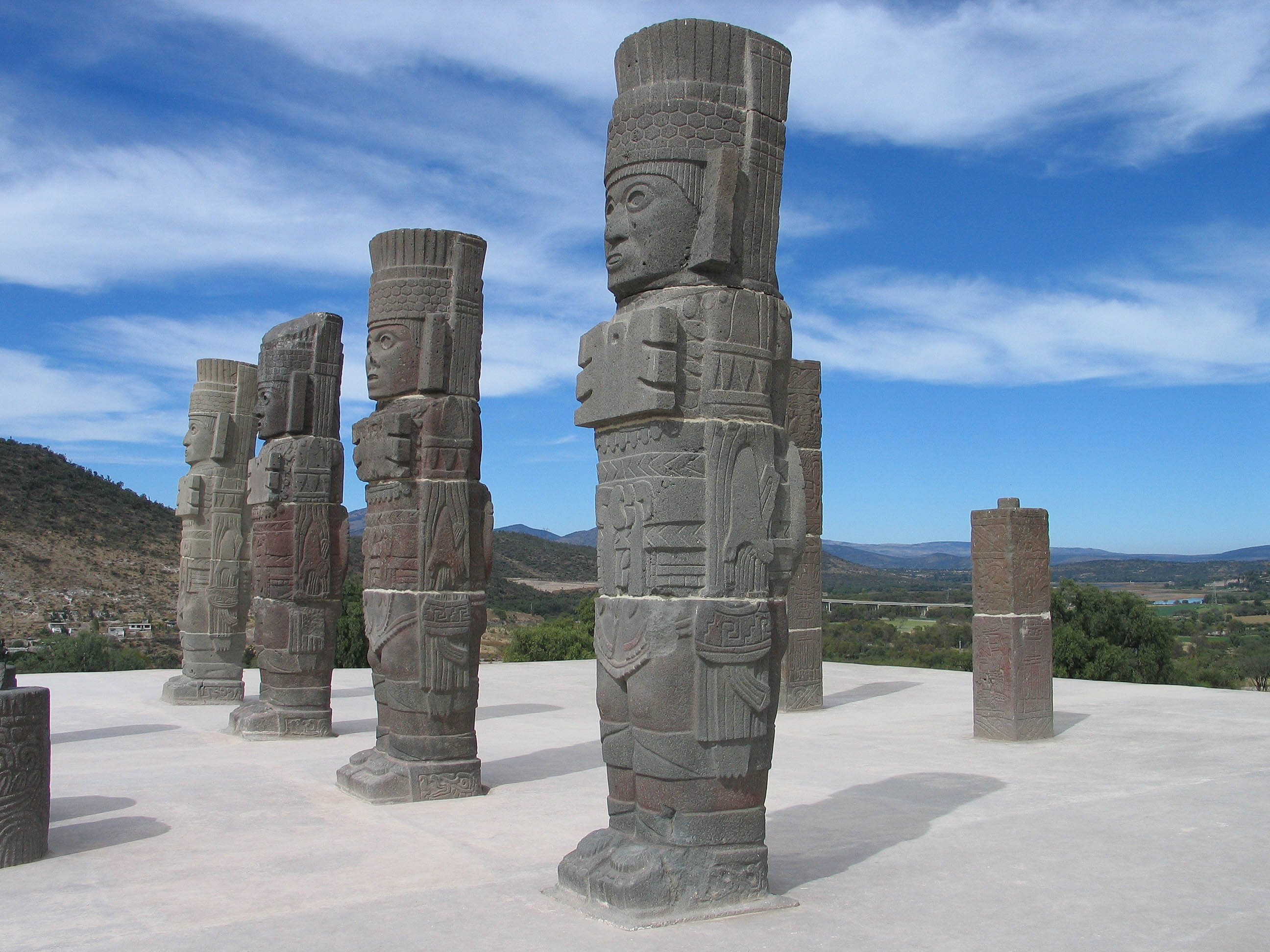
Atlantes at Tula, Hidalgo

These Indigenous civilizations are credited with many inventions: building pyramid temples, mathematics, astronomy, medicine, writing, highly accurate calendars, fine arts, intensive agriculture, engineering, an abacus calculator, and complex theology. They also invented the wheel, but it was used solely as a toy. In addition, they used native copper, silver, and gold for metalworking.

Archaic inscriptions on rocks and rock walls all over northern Mexico (especially in the state of Nuevo León) demonstrate an early propensity for counting. Their number system was base 20 and included zero. These early count markings were associated with astronomical events and underscore the influence that astronomical activities had upon Mesoamerican people before the arrival of Europeans. Many of the later Mesoamerican civilizations carefully built their cities and ceremonial centers according to specific astronomical events.

The biggest Mesoamerican cities, such as Teotihuacan, Tenochtitlan, and Cholula, were among the largest in the world. These cities grew as centers of commerce, ideas, ceremonies, and theology, and they radiated influence outwards onto neighboring cultures in central Mexico.

While many city-states, kingdoms, and empires competed with one another for power and prestige, Mesoamerica can be said to have had five major civilizations: the Olmecs, Teotihuacan, the Toltecs, the Mexica, and the Mayas. These civilizations (except for the politically fragmented Maya) extended their reach across Mesoamerica—and beyond—like no others. They consolidated power and distributed influence in matters of trade, art, politics, technology, and theology. Other regional power players made economic and political alliances with these civilizations over 4,000 years. Many made war with them, but almost all peoples found themselves within one of their spheres of influence.

Regional communications in ancient Mesoamerica have been the subject of considerable research. There is evidence of trade routes starting as far north as the Mexico Central Plateau, and going down to the Pacific coast. These trade routes and cultural contacts then went on as far as Central America. These networks operated with various interruptions from pre-Olmec times and up to the Late Classical Period (600–900 CE).

=== Olmec civilization ===
The earliest known civilization in Mesoamerica is the Olmec. This civilization established the cultural blueprint by which all succeeding indigenous civilizations would follow in Mexico. Pre-Olmec civilization began with the production of pottery in abundance, around 2300 BCE in the Grijalva River delta. Between 1600 and 1500 BCE, the Olmec civilization had begun, with the consolidation of power at their capital, a site today known as San Lorenzo Tenochtitlán near the coast in southeast Veracruz. The Olmec influence extended across Mexico, into Central America, and along the Gulf of Mexico. They transformed many peoples' thinking toward a new way of government, pyramid temples, writing, astronomy, art, mathematics, economics, and religion. Their achievements paved the way for the Maya civilization and the civilizations in central Mexico.

=== Teotihuacan civilization ===
The decline of the Olmec resulted in a power vacuum in Mexico. Emerging from that vacuum was Teotihuacan, first settled in 300 BCE. By 150 CE, Teotihuacan had risen to become the first true metropolis of what is now called North America. Teotihuacan established a new economic and political order never before seen in Mexico. Its influence stretched across Mexico into Central America, founding new dynasties in the Maya cities of Tikal, Copan, and Kaminaljuyú. Teotihuacan's influence over the Maya civilization cannot be overstated: it transformed political power, artistic depictions, and the nature of economics. Within the city of Teotihuacan was a diverse and cosmopolitan population. Most of the regional ethnicities of Mexico were represented in the city, such as Zapotecs from the Oaxaca region. They lived in apartment communities where they worked their trades and contributed to the city's economic and cultural prowess. Teotihuacan's economic pull impacted areas in northern Mexico as well. It was a city whose monumental architecture reflected a monumental new era in Mexican civilization, declining in political power about 650 CE—but lasting in cultural influence for the better part of a millennium, to around 950 CE.

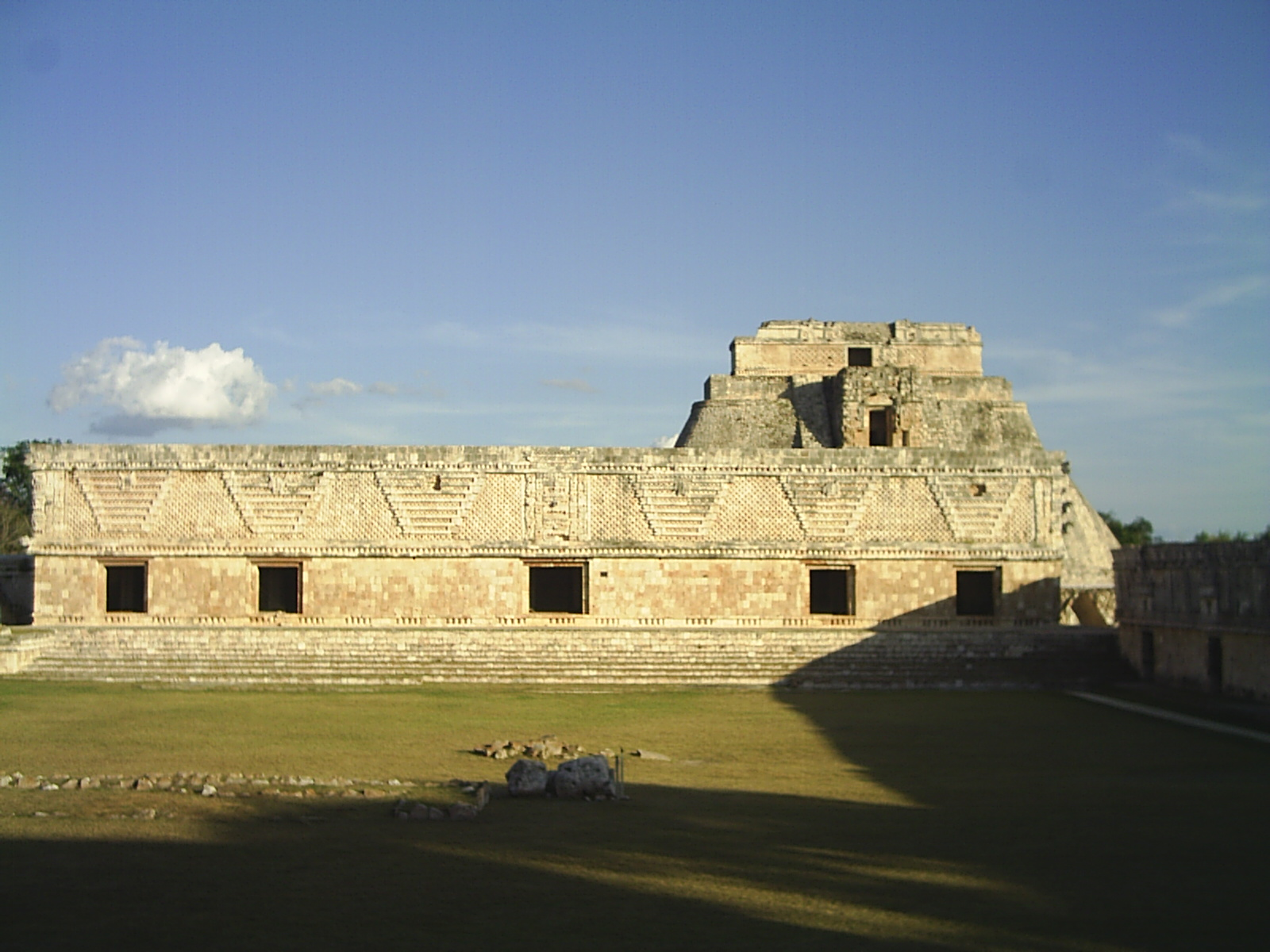
Maya architecture at Uxmal

=== Maya civilization ===
Contemporary to Teotihuacan's greatness was that of the Maya civilization. The period between 250 CE and 650 CE was a time of intense flourishing of Maya civilized accomplishments. While the many Maya city-states never achieved political unity on the order of the central Mexican civilizations, they exerted tremendous intellectual influence upon Mexico and Central America. The Maya built some of the most elaborate cities on the continent and made innovations in mathematics, astronomy, and calendrics. The Maya script also developed using pictographs and syllabic elements in the form of texts and codices inscribed on stone, pottery, wood, or perishable books made from bark paper.

=== Huastec civilization ===
The Huastecs were a Maya ethnic group that migrated northwards to the Gulf Coast of Mexico. The Huastecs are considered to be distinct from the Maya civilization, as they separated from the main Maya branch at around 2000 BCE and did not possess the Maya script. Other accounts also suggest that the Huastecs migrated as a result of the Classic Maya collapse around the year 900 CE.

=== Zapotec civilization ===
The Zapotecs were a civilization that thrived in the Oaxaca Valley from the late 6th century BCE until their downfall at the hands of the Spanish conquistadors. The city of Monte Albán was an important religious center for the Zapotecs and served as the capital of the empire from 700 BCE to 700 CE. The Zapotecs resisted the expansion of the Aztecs until they were subjugated in 1502 under Aztec emperor Ahuitzotl. After the Spanish conquest of the Aztec Empire, the Zapotecs resisted Spanish rule until King Cosijopii I surrendered in 1563.

=== Mixtec civilization ===
Like the Zapotecs, the Mixtecs thrived in the Oaxaca Valley. The Mixtecs consisted of separate independent kingdoms and city-states, rather than a single unified empire. The Mixtecs would eventually be conquered by the Aztecs until the Spanish conquest. The Mixtecs saw the Spanish conquest as an opportunity for liberation and established agreements with the conquistadors that allowed them to preserve their cultural traditions, though relatively few sections resisted Spanish rule.

=== Totonac civilization ===
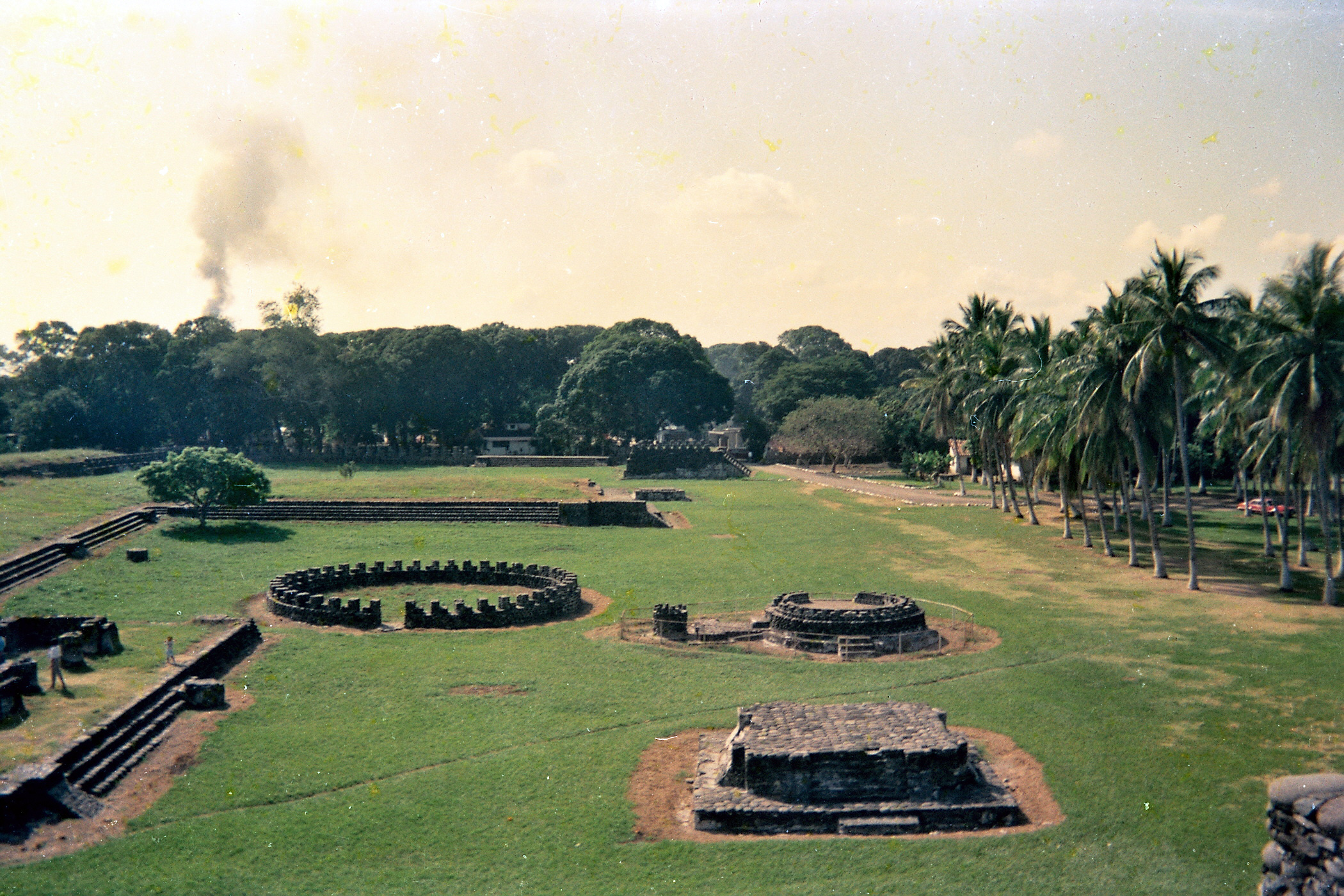
The Totonac city of Cempoala.

The Totonac civilization was concentrated in the present-day states of Veracruz and Puebla. The Totonacs were responsible for the establishment of cities, such as El Tajín as important commercial trading centers. The Totonacs would later assist in the Spanish conquest of the Aztec Empire as an opportunity to liberate themselves from Aztec military imperialism.

=== Toltec civilization ===
The Toltec civilization was established in the 8th century CE. The Toltec Empire expanded its political borders to as far south as the Yucatán peninsula, including the Maya city of Chichen Itza. The Toltecs established vast trading relations with other Mesoamerican civilizations in Central America and the Puebloans in present-day New Mexico. During the Post-Classic era, the Toltecs suffered a subsequent collapse in the early 12th century, due to famine and civil war. The Toltec civilization was so influential to the point where many groups such as the Aztecs claimed to be descended from.

=== Aztec/Mexica/Triple Alliance civilization ===
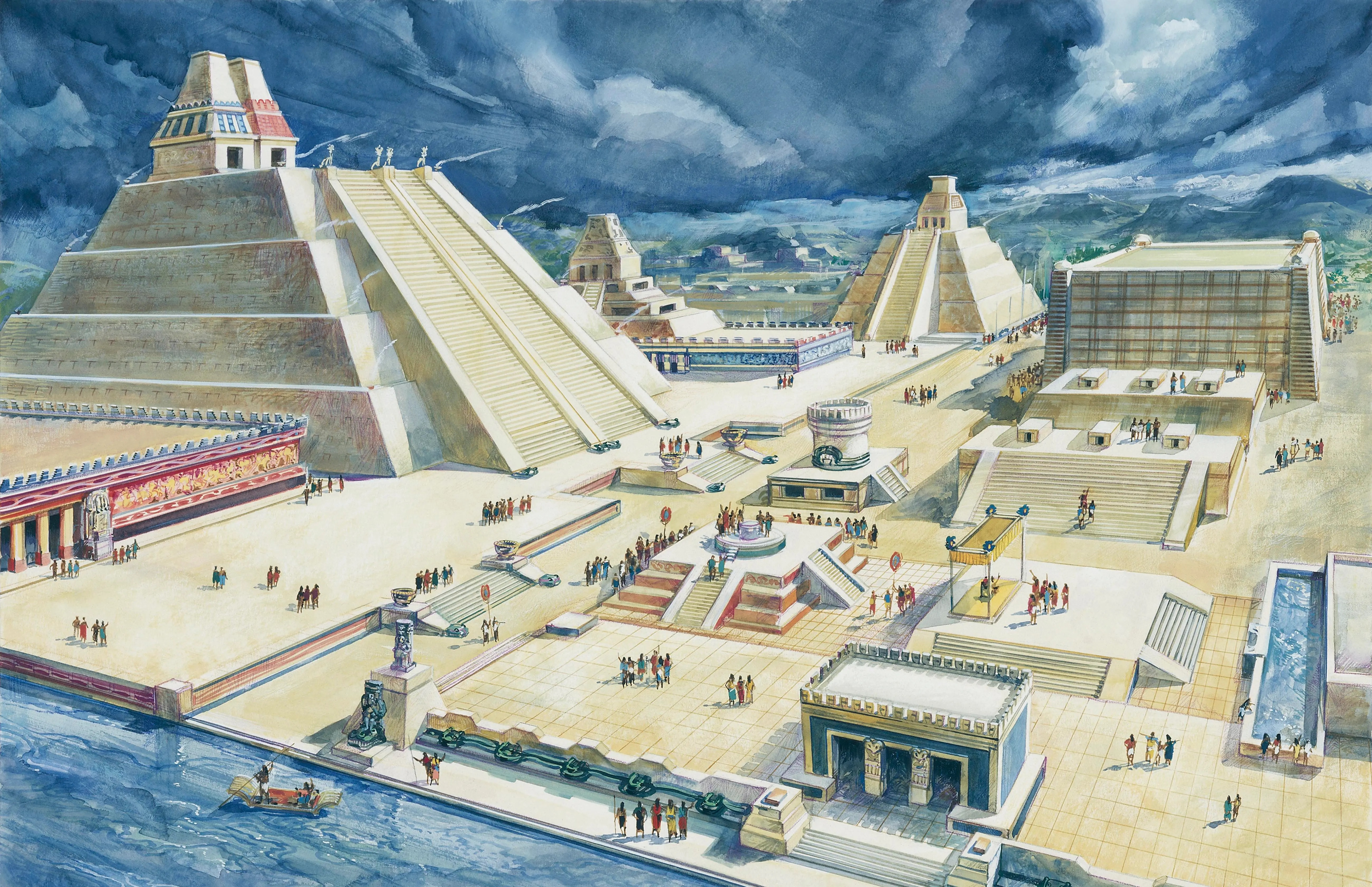
Tenochtitlan, the capital of the Aztec Empire.

With the decline of the Toltec civilization came political fragmentation in the Valley of Mexico. Into this new political game of contenders to the Toltec throne stepped outsiders: the Mexica. They were also a desert people, one of seven groups who formerly called themselves "Azteca", in memory of Aztlán, but they changed their name after years of migrating. Since they were not from the Valley of Mexico, they were initially seen as crude and unrefined in the ways of the Nahua civilization. Through political maneuvers and ferocious martial skills, they managed to rule Mexico as the head of the 'Triple Alliance' which included two other Aztec cities, Tetxcoco and Tlacopan.

Latecomers to Mexico's central plateau, the Mexica thought of themselves, nevertheless, as heirs of the civilizations that had preceded them. For them, arts, sculpture, architecture, engraving, feather-mosaic work, and the calendar, were bequest from the former inhabitants of Tula, the Toltecs.

The Mexica-Aztecs were the rulers of much of central Mexico by about 1400 (while Yaquis, Coras, and Apaches commanded sizable regions of northern desert), having subjugated most of the other regional states by the 1470s. At their peak, the Valley of Mexico where the Aztec Empire presided, saw a population growth that included nearly one million people during the late Aztec period (1350–1519).

Their capital, Tenochtitlan, is the site of modern-day Mexico City. At its peak, it was one of the largest cities in the world with population estimates of 200,000–300,000. The market established there was the largest ever seen by the conquistadores on arrival.

=== Tarascan/Purépecha civilization ===
Initially, the lands that would someday comprise the lands of the powerful Tarascan Empire were inhabited by several independent communities. Around 1300, however, the first Cazonci, Tariacuri, united these communities and built them into one of the most advanced civilizations in Mesoamerica. Their capital at Tzintzuntzan was just one of the many cities—there were ninety more under its control. The Tarascan Empire was among the largest in Central America, so it is no surprise that they routinely came into conflict with the neighboring Aztec Empire. Out of all the civilizations in its area, the Tarascan Empire was the most prominent in metallurgy, harnessing copper, silver, and gold to create items such as tools, decorations, and even weapons and armor. Bronze was also used. The great victories over the Aztecs by the Tarascans cannot be understated. Nearly every war they fought in resulted in a Tarascan victory. Because the Tarascan Empire had little links to the former Toltec Empire, they were also quite independent in culture from their neighbors. The Aztecs, Tlaxcaltec, Olmec, Mixtec, Maya, and others were very similar to each other, however. This is because they were all directly preceded by the Toltecs, and they therefore shared almost identical cultures. The Tarascans, however, possessed a unique religion, as well as other things.

=== Tlaxcala republic ===
Tlaxcala was a Nahua republic and confederation in central Mexico. The Tlaxcalans fiercely resisted Aztec expansion during the Flower Wars ever since the Aztecs expelled them from Lake Texcoco. The Tlaxcalans would later ally with the Spanish conquistadors under Hernán Cortés as an opportunity to liberate them from the Aztecs and managed to successfully conquer the Aztecs with the help of the conquistadors. The Spaniards would reward the Tlaxcalans for preserving their culture and for their assistance in defeating the Aztecs. The Tlaxcalans would once again assist to the Spaniards during the Mixtón War and the conquest of Guatemala.

=== Cuzcatlan ===
Cuzcatlan was a Pipil confederacy of kingdoms and city-states located in present-day El Salvador. According to legend, Cuzcatlan was established by Toltec migrants during the Classic Maya collapse in approximately 1200 CE. During the Spanish conquest of El Salvador, Cuzcatlan was forced to surrender to conquistador Pedro de Alvarado in 1528.

=== Lenca ===
The Lenca people were composed of several distinct multilingual confederations and city-states in present-day El Salvador and Honduras. Cities such as Yarumela were important commercial centers for the Lenca. During the Spanish conquest, several Lenca leaders such as Lempira resisted conversion to Christianity, while others converted peacefully.

=== Nicānāhuac ===
Nicānāhuac ("Here Surrounded By Water" in Nahuatl) was the geographical endonym used by the Nicarao, an offshoot of the Pipil people from El Salvador, to refer to western Nicaragua. The Nicarao had multiple chiefdoms that were independent from one another, these chiefdoms ranged from the Chinandega department in northwestern Nicaragua to Guanacaste province in northwestern Costa Rica. Although the Nicarao chiefdoms shared the same language, culture, and ethnicity, they were never unified under a single political entity as Kuskatan was in El Salvador. The Nicarao civilization collapsed during the Spanish conquest of Nicaragua in 1522.

=== Nicoya kingdom ===
The Nicoya kingdom was an elective monarchy that thrived in the Nicoya peninsula in Costa Rica. It existed from 800 CE until the Spanish arrival in the 16th century.

== South America ==
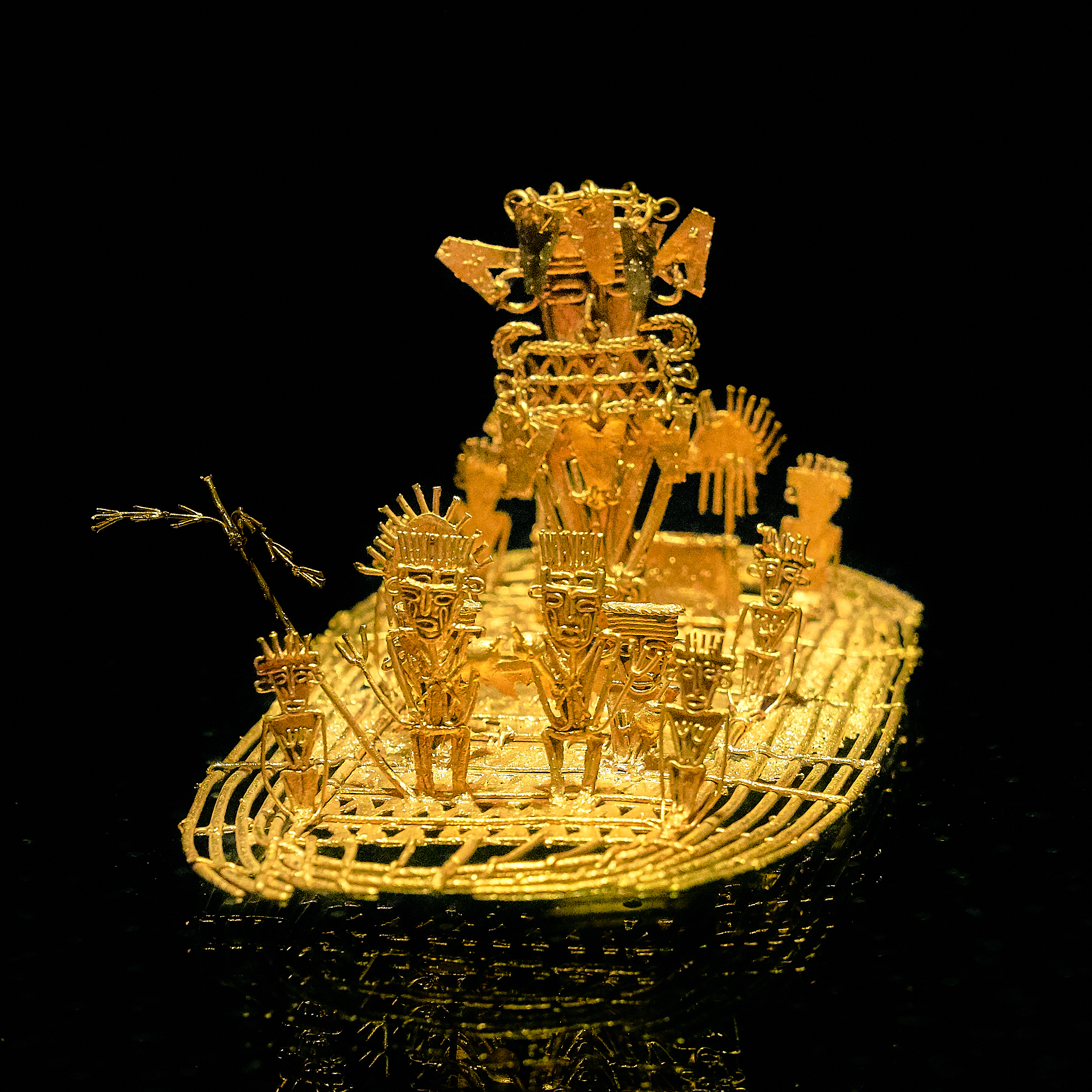
Muisca raft. The figure refers to the ceremony of the legend of El Dorado.

By the first millennium, South America's vast rainforests, mountains, plains, and coasts were the home of millions of people. Estimates vary, but 30–50 million are often given, and 100 million by some estimates. Some groups formed permanent settlements. Among those groups were Chibcha-speaking peoples ("Muisca" or "Muysca"), Valdivia, Quimbaya, Calima, Marajoara culture, and the Tairona. The Muisca of Colombia, postdating the Herrera Period, Valdivia of Ecuador, the Quechuas, and the Aymara of Peru and Bolivia were the four most important sedentary Amerindian groups in South America. Since the 1970s, numerous geoglyphs have been discovered on deforested land in the Amazon rainforest, Brazil, supporting Spanish accounts of complex and ancient Amazonian civilizations, such as Kuhikugu. The Upano Valley sites in present-day eastern Ecuador predate all known complex Amazonian societies.

The theory of pre-Columbian contact across the South Pacific Ocean between South America and Polynesia has received support from several lines of evidence, although solid confirmation remains elusive. A diffusion by human agents has been put forward to explain the pre-Columbian presence in Oceania of several cultivated plant species native to South America, such as the bottle gourd (Lagenaria siceraria) or sweet potato (Ipomoea batatas). Direct archaeological evidence for such pre-Columbian contacts and transport has not emerged. Similarities noted in the names of edible roots in Maori and Ecuadorian languages ("kumari") and Melanesian and Chilean ("gaddu") have been inconclusive.

A 2007 paper published in PNAS put forward DNA and archaeological evidence that domesticated chickens had been introduced into South America via Polynesia by late pre-Columbian times. These findings were challenged by a later study published in the same journal, that cast doubt on the dating calibration used and presented alternative mtDNA analyses that disagreed with a Polynesian genetic origin. The origin and dating remain an open issue. Whether or not early Polynesian–American exchanges occurred, no compelling human-genetic, archaeological, cultural, or linguistic legacy of such contact has turned up.

=== Norte Chico civilization ===
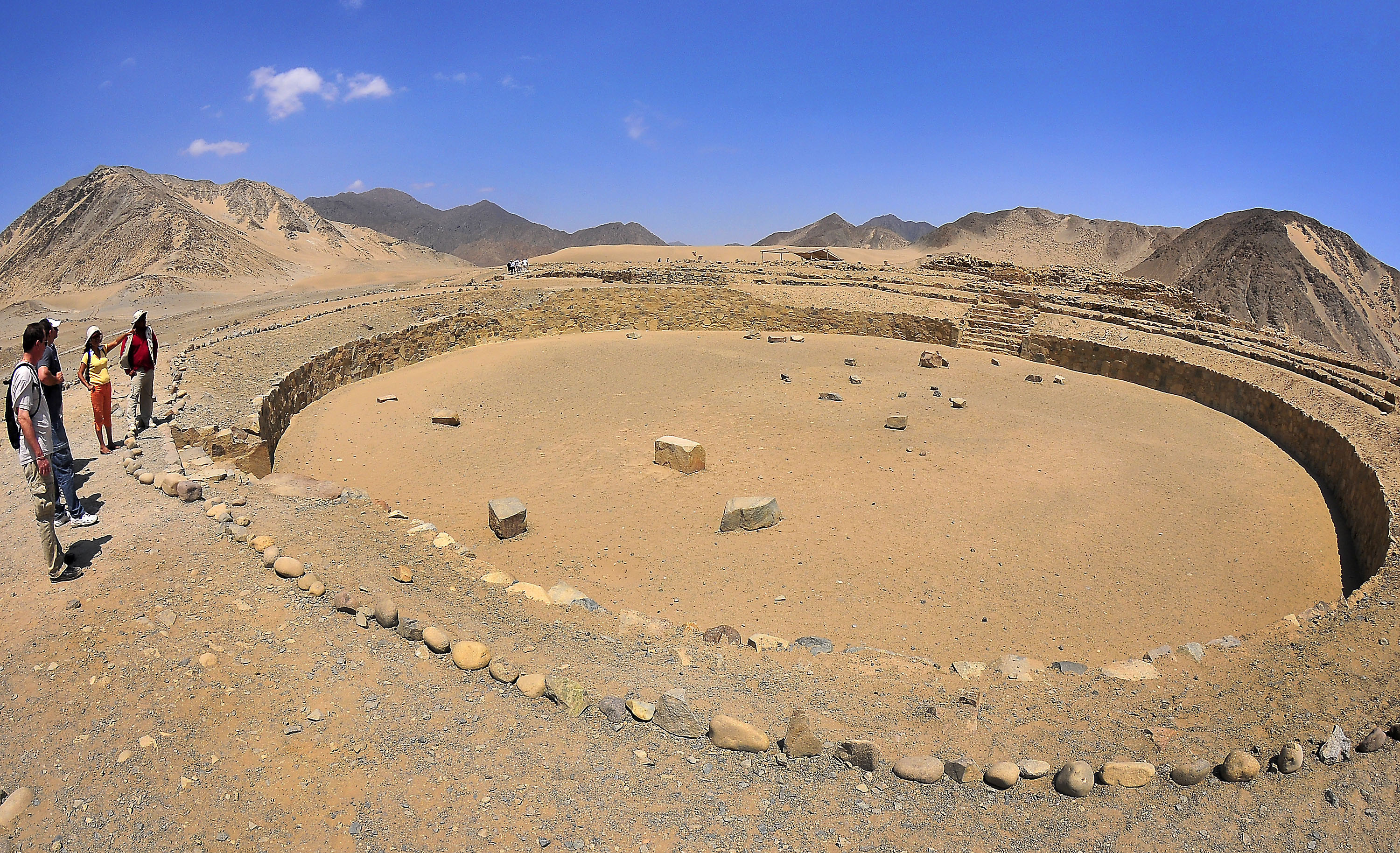
The ancient city of Caral

On the north-central coast of present-day Peru, Norte Chico or Caral-Supe (as known in Peru) was a civilization that emerged around 3200 BCE (contemporary with urbanism's rise in Mesopotamia). It had a cluster of large-scale urban settlements of which the Sacred City of Caral, in the Supe Valley, is one of the largest and best-studied sites. The civilization did not know machinery or pottery but still managed to develop trade, especially cotton and dehydrated fish. It was a hierarchical society that managed its ecosystems and had intercultural exchange. Its economy was heavily dependent on agriculture and fishing on the nearby coast. It is considered one of the cradles of civilization in the world and Caral-Supe is the oldest known civilization in the Americas.

=== Valdivia culture ===
The Valdivia culture was concentrated on the coast of Ecuador. Their existence was recently discovered by archeological findings. Their culture is among the oldest found in the Americas, spanning from 3500 to 1800 BCE. The Valdivia lived in a community of houses built in a circle or oval around a central plaza. They were sedentary people who lived off farming and fishing, though occasionally they hunted for deer. From the remains that have been found, scholars have determined that Valdivians cultivated maize, kidney beans, squash, cassava, chili peppers, and cotton plants, the last of which was used to make clothing. Valdivian pottery initially was rough and practical, but it became showy, delicate, and big over time. They generally used red and gray colors, and the polished dark red pottery is characteristic of the Valdivia period. In its ceramics and stone works, the Valdivia culture shows a progression from the most simple to much more complicated works.

=== Cañari people ===
The Cañari were the indigenous natives of today's Ecuadorian provinces of Cañar and Azuay. They were an elaborate civilization with advanced architecture and complex religious beliefs. The Inca destroyed and burned most of their remains. The Cañari's old city was replaced twice, first by the Incan city of Tumebamba and later on the same site by the colonial city of Cuenca. The city was also believed to be the site of El Dorado, the city of gold from the mythology of Colombia.

The Cañari were most notable for having repelled the Incan invasion with fierce resistance for many years until they fell to Tupac Yupanqui. Many of their descendants are still present in Cañar. The majority did not mix with the colonists or become Mestizos.

=== Chavín civilization ===
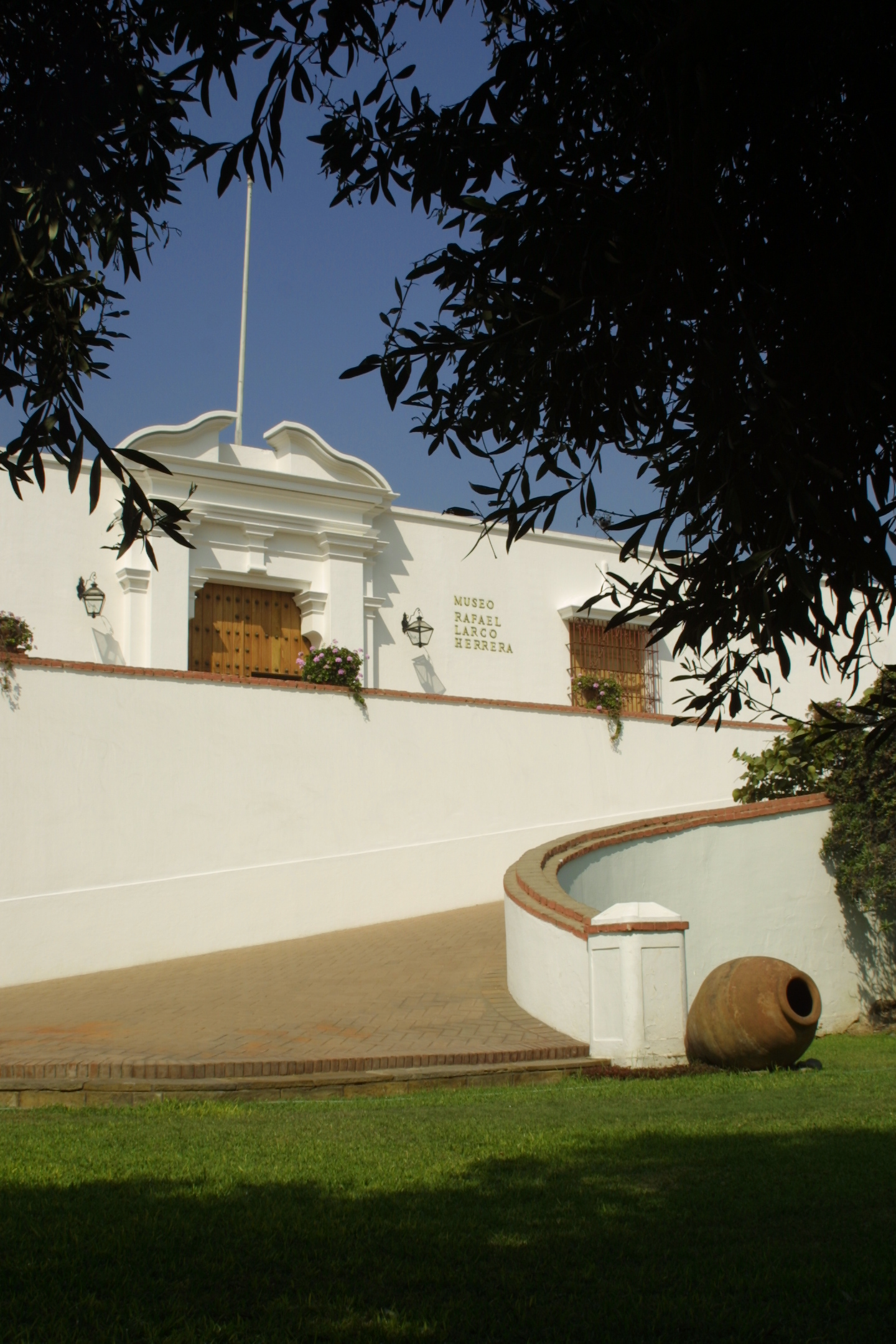
Larco Museum houses the largest private collection of pre-Columbian art. Lima, Peru.

The Chavín, a Peruvian preliterate civilization, established a trade network and developed agriculture by 900 BCE, according to some estimates and archeological finds. Artifacts were found at a site called Chavín de Huántar in modern Peru at an elevation of 3,177 meters (10,423 ft). The Chavín civilization spanned from 900 to 300 BCE.

=== Muisca confederation ===
The Chibcha-speaking communities were the most numerous, the most territorially extended and the most socio-economically developed of the pre-Hispanic Colombians. By the 8th century, the indigenous people had established their civilization in the northern Andes. At one point, the Chibchas occupied part of what is now Panama, and the high plains of the Eastern Sierra of Colombia.

The areas that they occupied in Colombia were the present-day Departments of Santander (North and South), Boyacá, and Cundinamarca. This is where the first farms and industries were developed. It is also where the independence movement originated. They are currently the richest areas in Colombia. The Chibcha developed the most populous zone between the Maya region and the Inca Empire. Next to the Quechua of Peru and the Aymara in Bolivia, the Chibcha of the eastern and north-eastern Highlands of Colombia developed the most notable culture among the sedentary Indigenous peoples in South America.

In the Colombian Andes, the Chibcha comprised several tribes who spoke similar languages (Chibcha). They included the following: the Muisca, Guane, Lache, Cofán, and Chitareros.

=== Tairona confederation ===
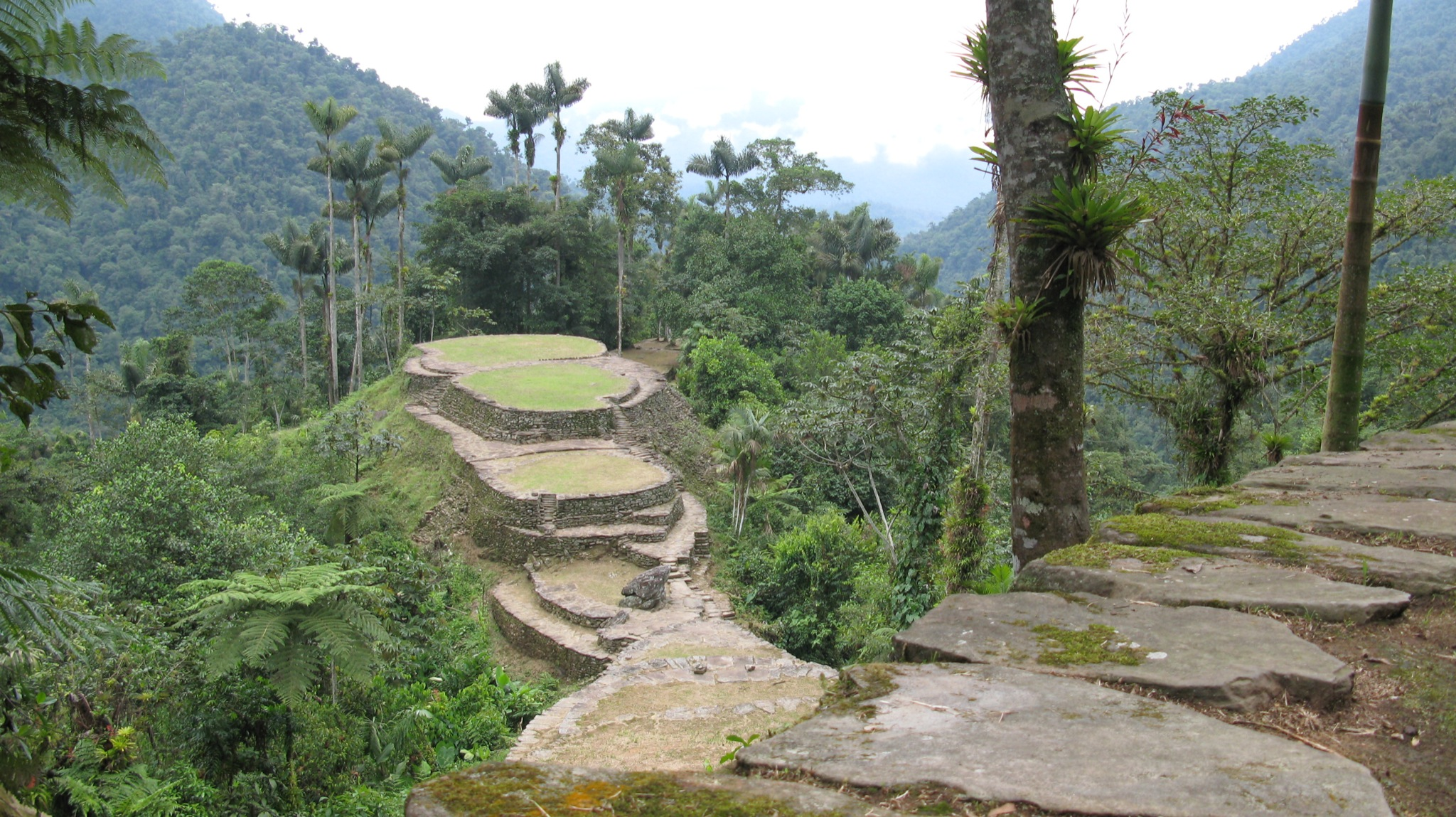
Ciudad Perdida ("The Lost City")

The Tairona civilization thrived in the Sierra Nevada de Santa Marta mountain range in northern Colombia. Studies suggest that the civilization thrived from the 1st century CE until the Spanish arrival in the 16th century. The descendants of the Tairona, such as the Kogi were one of the few indigenous groups in the Americas to have escaped full colonial conquest and retain a majority of their indigenous cultures.

=== Moche civilization ===
The Moche thrived on the north coast of Peru from about 100 to 800 CE. The heritage of the Moche is seen in their elaborate burials. Some were recently excavated by UCLA's Christopher B. Donnan in association with the National Geographic Society.

As skilled artisans, the Moche were a technologically advanced people. They traded with distant peoples such as the Maya. What has been learned about the Moche is based on the study of their ceramic pottery; the carvings reveal details of their daily lives. The Larco Museum of Lima, Peru, has an extensive collection of such ceramics. They show that the people practiced human sacrifice, had blood-drinking rituals and that their religion incorporated non-procreative sexual practices (such as fellatio).

=== Wari Empire ===
The Wari Empire was located in the western portion of Peru and existed from the 6th century to the 11th century. Wari, as the former capital city was called, is located 11 km (6.8 mi) northeast of the city of Ayacucho. This city was the center of a civilization that covered much of the highlands and coast of Peru. The best-preserved remnants, besides the Wari Ruins, are the recently discovered Northern Wari ruins near the city of Chiclayo, and Cerro Baul in Moquegua. Also well-known are the Wari ruins of Pikillaqta ("Flea Town"), a short distance southeast of the Cusco en route to Lake Titicaca.

=== Tiwanaku Empire ===
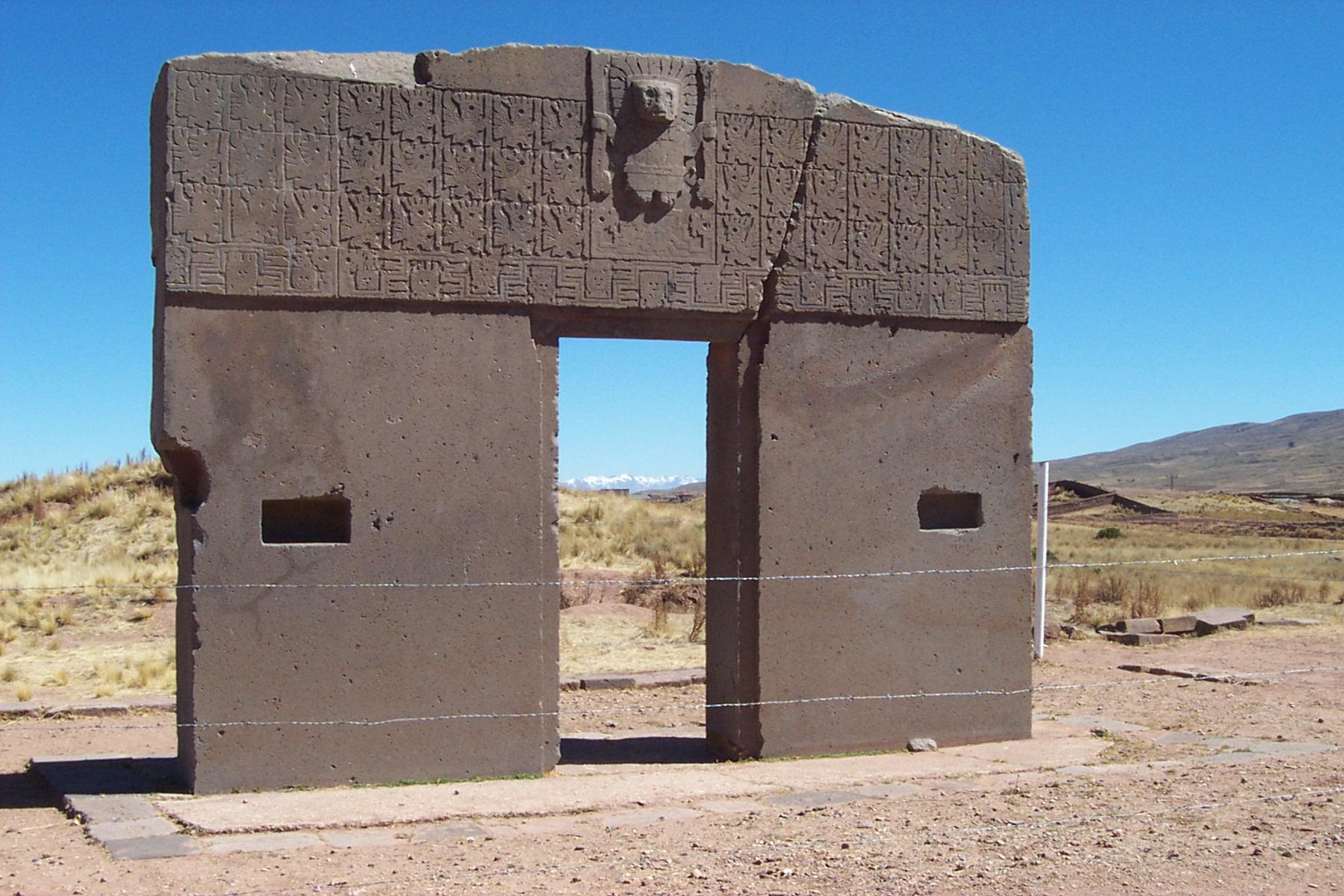
Gate of the Sun in Tiwanaku

The Tiwanaku empire was based in western Bolivia and extended into present-day Peru and Chile from 300 to 1000 CE. Tiwanaku is recognized by Andean scholars as one of the most important South American civilizations before the birth of the Inca Empire in Peru; it was the ritual and administrative capital of a major state power for approximately five hundred years. The ruins of the ancient city state are near the south-eastern shore of Lake Titicaca in Tiwanaku Municipality, Ingavi Province, La Paz Department, about 72 kilometres (45 miles) west of La Paz.

=== Inca Empire ===
Holding their capital at the great cougar-shaped city of Cusco, Peru, the Inca civilization dominated the Andes region from 1438 to 1533. Known as Tawantinsuyu, or "the land of the four regions", in Quechua, the Inca civilization was highly distinct and developed. Inca rule extended to nearly a hundred linguistic or ethnic communities, some 9 to 14 million people connected by a 40,000-kilometer road system. Cities were built with precise stonework, constructed over many levels of mountain terrain. Terrace farming was a useful form of agriculture. There is evidence of excellent metalwork and even successful brain surgery in the Inca civilization.

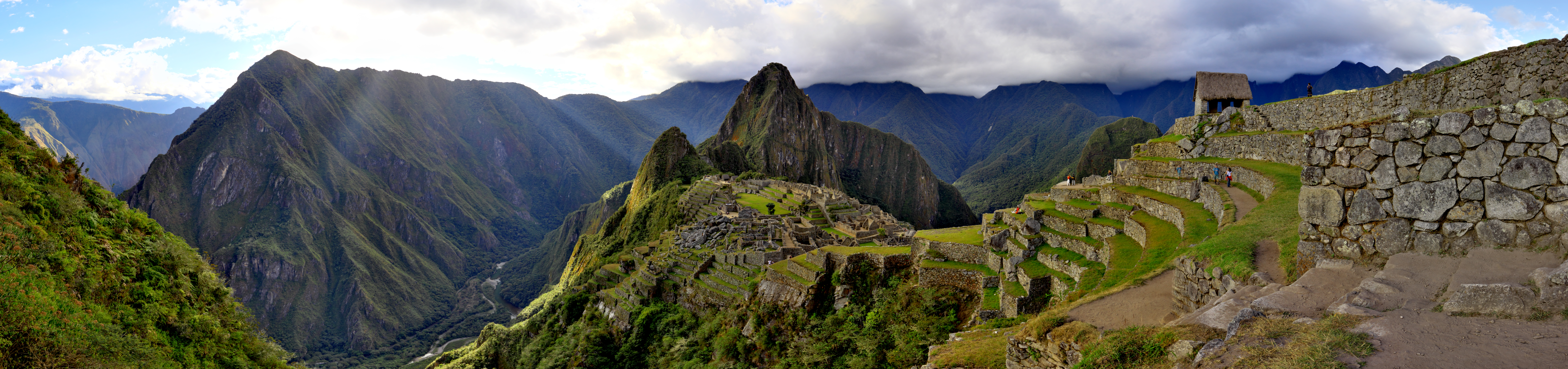
The iconic Machu Picchu, symbol of the Inca civilization

=== Aymara kingdoms ===
The Aymara kingdoms consisted of a confederation of separate diarchies that lasted from 1151 after the fall of Tiwanaku until 1477 when they were conquered by the Inca Empire. The Aymara kingdoms were primarily located in the Altiplano in Bolivia as well as some parts of Peru and Chile.

=== Caribbean coast of South America ===
Archeologists have discovered evidence of the earliest known inhabitants of the Venezuelan area in the form of leaf-shaped flake tools, together with chopping and plano–convex scraping implements exposed on the high riverine terraces of the Pedregal River in western Venezuela. Late Pleistocene hunting artifacts, including spear tips, come from a similar site in northwestern Venezuela known as El Jobo. According to radiocarbon dating, these date from 13,000 to 7000 BCE.

Taima-Taima, yellow Muaco, and El Jobo in Falcón are some of the sites that have yielded archeological material from these times. These groups co-existed with megafauna like megatherium, glyptodonts, and toxodonts.

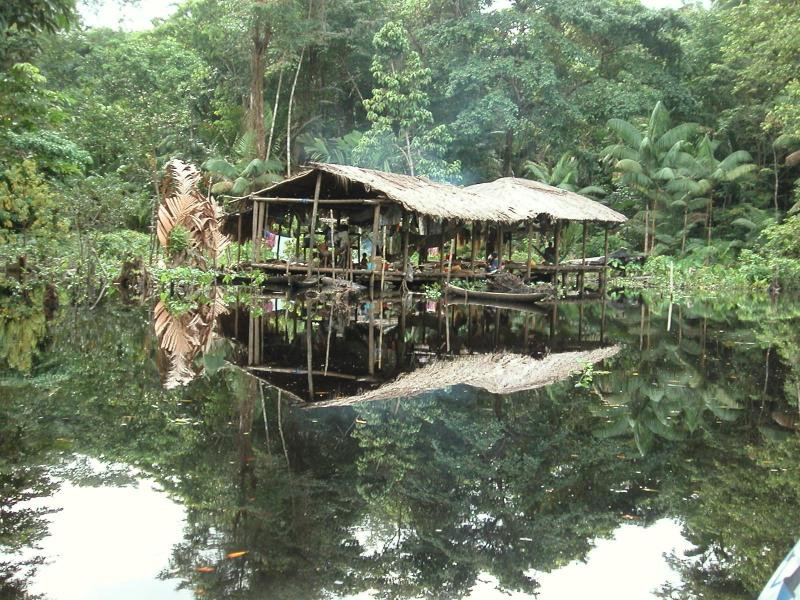
A palafito like the ones seen by Amerigo Vespucci

It is not known how many people lived in Venezuela before the Spanish Conquest; it may have been around a million people, in addition to today's peoples included groups such as the Lokono, Kalina, and Timoto-cuicas. The number was much reduced after the Conquest, mainly through the spread of new diseases from Europe. There were two main north–south axes of the pre-Columbian population, producing maize in the west and manioc in the east. Large parts of the Llanos plains were cultivated through a combination of slash-and-burn and permanent settled agriculture basically maize and tobacco. The indigenous peoples of Venezuela had already encountered crude oils and asphalts that seeped up through the ground to the surface. Known to the locals as mene, the thick, black liquid was primarily used for medicinal purposes, as an illumination source, and for the caulking of canoes.

In the 16th century when Spanish colonization began in Venezuelan territory, the population of several Indigenous peoples such as the Mariches (descendants of the Kalina) declined.

=== Diaguita confederation ===
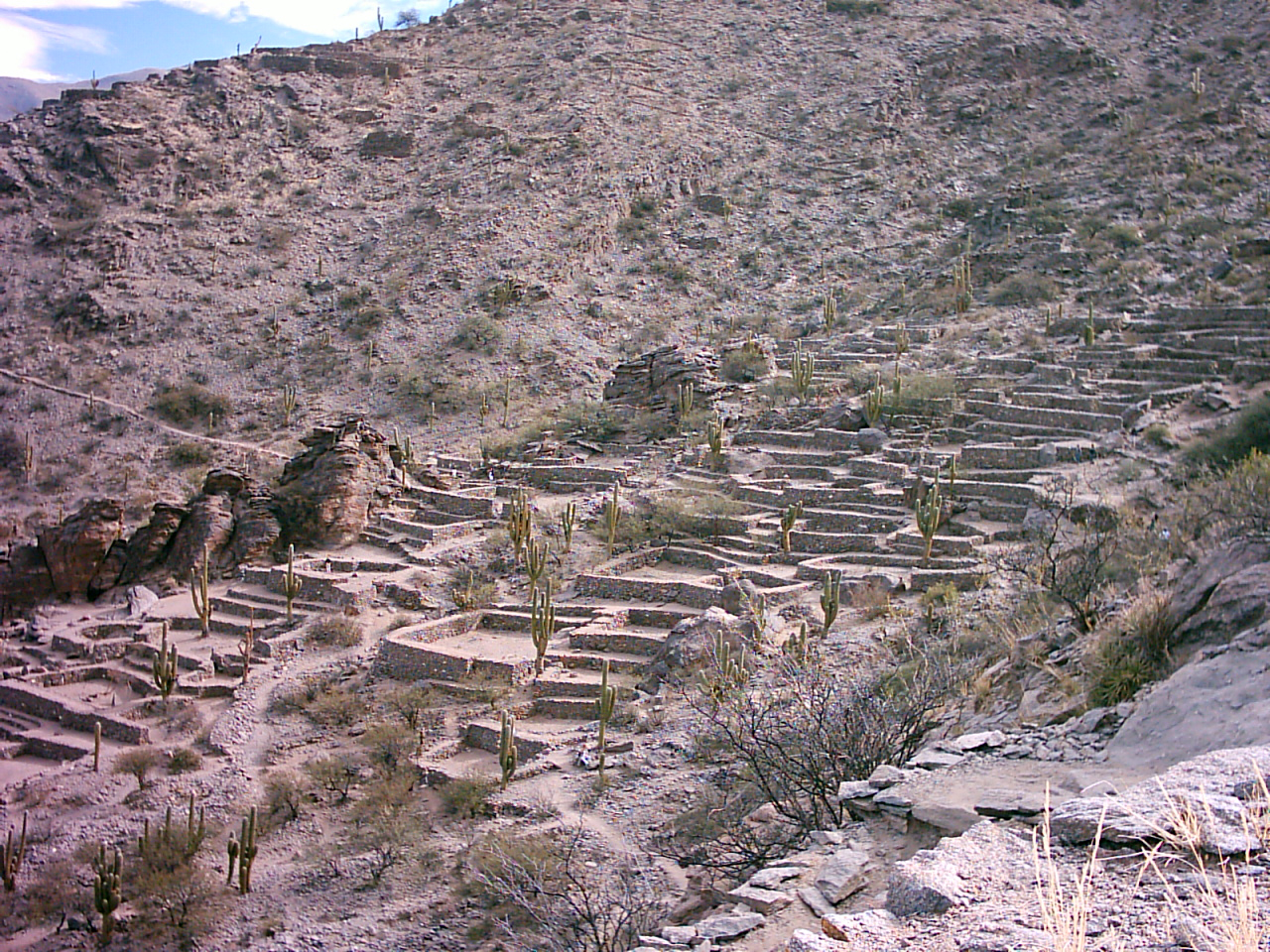
The Ruins of Quilmes in Tucumán Province, Argentina.

The Diaguita consisted of several distinct chiefdoms across the Argentine Northwest. The Diaguita culture emerged around 1000 CE after the replacement of the Las Ánimas complex. The Diaguita resisted Spanish colonialism during the Calchaquí Wars until they were forced to surrender and submit to Spanish rule in 1667.

=== Taíno ===
The Taíno people were fragmented into numerous chiefdoms across the Greater Antilles, the Lucayan Archipelago, and the northern Lesser Antilles. The Taíno were the first pre-Columbian people to encounter Christopher Columbus during his voyage in 1492. The Taíno would later be subject to slavery by the Spanish colonists under the encomienda system until they were deemed virtually extinct in 1565.

=== Huetar kingdoms ===
The Huetar people were a major ethnic group that lived in Costa Rica. The Huetar were composed of several independent kingdoms, such as the western kingdom ruled by Garabito and the eastern kingdom ruled by El Guarco and Correque. After their annexation into Spanish administration, the descendants of the Huetar currently reside in the Quitirrisí reserve.

=== Marajoara culture ===
The Marajoara culture flourished on Marajó Island at the mouth of the Amazon River in northern Brazil between 800 and 1400 CE. The Marajoara consisted of a complex society that built mounds and constructed sophisticated settlements. The indigenous people of the area adopted methods of large-scale agriculture through the use of terra preta, which would support complex chiefdoms. Studies suggest that the civilization housed around 100,000 inhabitants.

=== Kuhikugu ===
Located in the Xingu Indigenous Park in Brazil, Kuhikugu consisted of an urban complex that housed around 50,000 inhabitants and 20 settlements. The civilization was likely established by the ancestors of the Kuikuro people. The people also constructed roads, bridges, and trenches for defensive purposes and were purported to be farmers, as evidenced by the fields of cassava and the use of terra preta. Like most other Amazonian civilizations, the disappearance of Kuhikugu was largely attributed to Old World diseases introduced by European colonists.

=== Cambeba ===
Also known as the Omagua, Umana, and Kambeba, the Cambeba are an indigenous people in Brazil's Amazon basin. The Cambeba were a populous, organized society in the late pre-Columbian era whose population suffered a steep decline in the early years of the Columbian Exchange. The Spanish explorer Francisco de Orellana traversed the Amazon River during the 16th century and reported densely populated regions running hundreds of kilometers along the river. These populations left no lasting monuments, possibly because they used local wood as their construction material as stone was not locally available. While it is possible Orellana may have exaggerated the level of development among the Amazonians, their semi-nomadic descendants have the odd distinction among tribal indigenous societies of a hereditary, yet landless, aristocracy. Archaeological evidence has revealed the continued presence of semi-domesticated orchards, as well as vast areas of land enriched with terra preta. Both of these discoveries, along with Cambeba ceramics discovered within the same archaeological levels suggest that a large and organized civilization existed in the area.

=== Upano Valley cultures ===
In the Upano River valley of eastern Ecuador, several cities were established by the Upano and Kilamope cultures around 500 BCE. The cities in the Upano Valley consisted of agricultural societies that cultivated crops such as corn, manioc and sweet potato. The cities fell into decline around 600 CE.

== Agricultural development ==
Early inhabitants of the Americas developed agriculture, developing and breeding wild teosinte into modern corn. Potatoes, cassava, tomatoes, tomatillos (a husked green relative of the tomato), pumpkins, chili peppers, squash, beans, pineapple, sweet potatoes, the grains quinoa and amaranth, cocoa beans, vanilla, onion, peanuts, strawberries, raspberries, blueberries, blackberries, papaya, and avocados were among other plants grown by natives. Over two-thirds of all types of food crops grown worldwide are native to the Americas.

Early Indigenous peoples began using fire in a widespread manner. Intentional burning of vegetation was taken up to mimic the effects of natural fires that tended to clear forest understories, thereby making travel easier and facilitating the growth of herbs and berry-producing plants that were important for both food and medicines. This created the pre-Columbian savannas of North America.

While not as widespread as in Afro-Eurasia, indigenous Americans did have livestock. Domesticated turkeys were common in Mesoamerica and some regions of North America; they were valued for their meat, feathers, and, possibly, eggs. There is documentation of Mesoamericans utilizing hairless dogs, especially the Xoloitzcuintle breed, for their meat. Andean societies had llamas and alpacas for meat and wool, as well as for beasts of burden. Guinea pigs were raised for meat in the Andes. Iguanas and a range of wild animals, such as deer and pecari, were another source of meat in Mexico, Central, and northern South America.

By the 15th century, maize had been transmitted from Mexico and was being farmed in the Mississippi embayment, as far as the East Coast of the United States, and as far north as southern Canada. Potatoes were used by the Inca, and chocolate was used by the Aztecs.

== See also ==
- 1491: New Revelations of the Americas Before Columbus, 2005 book by Charles C. Mann
- Before the Revolution, 2013 book by Daniel K. Richter
- List of pre-Columbian cultures
- Metallurgy in pre-Columbian America
- Periodization of pre-Columbian Peru
- Population history of indigenous peoples of the Americas
- Pre-Columbian trans-oceanic contact theories
- Pre-Columbian history of Brazil
