= Genghis Khan and the Making of the Modern World =

2004 book by Jack Weatherford

- Author: Jack Weatherford
- Illustrator: S. Badral
- Cover artist: Stapleton collection/Corbis
- Language: English
- Genre: History/ Biography
- Publisher: Crown and Three Rivers Press
- Publication date: 2004
- Publication place: United States
- Media type: Print
- Pages: 312
- ISBN: 0-609-80964-4
- Preceded by: The History of Money
- Followed by: The Secret History of the Mongol Queens: How the Daughters of Genghis Khan Rescued His Empire

Genghis Khan and the Making of the Modern World (2004) is a history book written by Jack Weatherford, Dewitt Wallace Professor of Anthropology at Macalester College.

== Summary ==
The book is a narrative of the rise and influence of Mongol leader Genghis Khan and his successors, and their influence on European civilization. Weatherford provides a different slant on Genghis Khan than has been typical in most Western accounts, attributing positive cultural effects to his rule.

In the last section, Weatherford reviews the historiography of Genghis Khan in the West and argues that the leader's early portrayal in writings as an "excellent, noble king" changed to that of a brutal pagan during the Age of Enlightenment. Weatherford made use of three major non-Western sources, namely The Secret History of the Mongols, the Ta' rīkh-i jahān-gushā of Juvayni and the Jami al-Tawarikh of Rashid-al-Din Hamadani.

== Background ==
In 1979 Paul Ratchnevsky wrote about the Khan's knack for forging alliances, his fairness in dividing the spoils, and his patronage of the sciences. Similarly, Saunders and H. H. Howorth have argued that the Mongol empire contributed to opening up intellectual interactions between China, the Middle East, and Europe.

The book suggests that the western depiction of the Mongols as savages who destroyed civilization was due to the Mongols' approach to dealing with the competing leadership classes. The Mongols practiced killing the ruling classes in order to subdue the general population, a technique used by other cultures as well. Survivors of the upper classes wrote the histories and expressed resentment of Mongol brutality toward them. Weatherford explores the Mongol treatment of the general population (peasants, tradesmen, merchants) under Mongol rule. He suggests their rule was less burdensome than that of European nobility due to lighter taxes, tolerance of local customs and religions, more rational administration, and universal education for boys.

These benefits were enjoyed only by populations who surrendered immediately to the Mongol invaders. Those populations that resisted could be massacred as a warning to other towns/cities. These massacres were a method of psychological warfare to alert those populations not yet conquered. The resulting terror helped color the historical portrayal of the Mongols.

Since the Mongols were nomadic horsemen of the steppes, they were dependent on taxes from the subjugated peoples for wealth and luxury goods. Weatherford's book claims that the Mongols sought to increase that wealth by encouraging their subjects to be more productive and enterprising instead of increasing the tax burden on them. They did this by sponsoring lucrative international trade. He says that they encouraged scientific advances, and improved agriculture and production methods. Many innovations came from the combination of technologies from different cultures within their huge empire.

== Reception ==
In a 2005 review, Timothy May wrote that some of Weatherford's thesis was "without question, controversial". Nevertheless, Weatherford "presents his case very eloquently and with an abundance of evidence demonstrating not only the indirect influence of the Mongols in Europe but also the transformation of the Mongols from agents of innovation in the Renaissance into agents of destruction in the European mind during Enlightenment." He notes that the book lacks footnotes, and notations in the back are hard to follow and lacking in many cases. In addition, he writes, "While the overall thrust of the book is on target and may promote new discourse on the influence of the Mongols in history, it is undermined by numerous mistakes." May recommended against the book's use in history classes, although noting that the book is well written and engaging.

In a 2016 review, Simon Winchester praised "this fine and fascinating book". He appreciated in his review for the New York Times that "Weatherford's writings present us revisionist history on a grand scale, but one as scrupulously well researched (with ample endnotes) as such an intellectual overhaul needs to be". Kirkus Reviews wrote: "Weatherford's lively analysis restores the Mongol's reputation, and it takes wonderful learned detours. ... Well written and full of surprises.”

The book stayed on the New York Times Bestseller List for two weeks in 2004. In a tournament of audiobooks by Audible.com, the book was honored in 2011 as a champion, together with Karl Marlantes' Matterhorn. It was the book of the week by CNN in 2011. On 12 October 2014, the book ranked at 6 on the New York Times e-book bestseller list.
