= Jack Weatherford =

American anthropologist (born 1946)

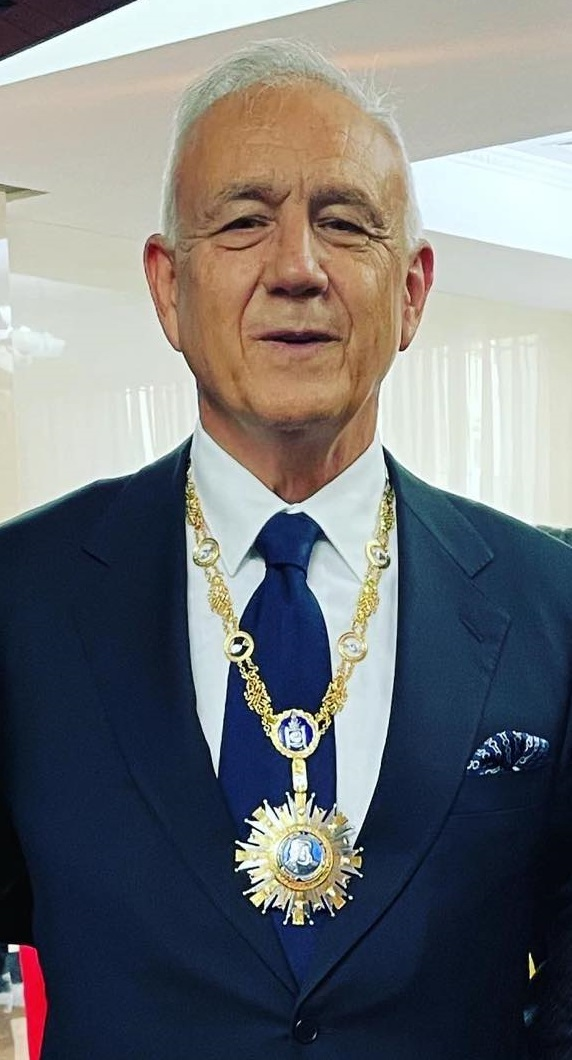
- Jack Weatherford in 2022
- Born: 1946 (age 79–80); Dovesville, South Carolina
- Citizenship: American
- Education: University of California, San Diego (PhD); Frankfurt University (Fellowship); Duke University (Fellowship)
- Occupations: Ethnographer, Anthropologist, Historian
- Writing career
- Genres: Anthropology, Native American Studies, Mongolian Studies

Jack McIver Weatherford (born 1946) is an American anthropologist and author, best known for his 2004 book, Genghis Khan and the Making of the Modern World.

Through his academic publications and broader writing, Weatherford has brought global attention to overlooked histories, enriching public understanding of cultural exchange, innovation, and the evolving dynamics of power throughout history.

== Biography ==
In 1946 Weatherford was born on a farm in Dovesville, South Carolina to Anna Ruth Grooms and Alfred Gregg Weatherford, as the oldest of seven children. His father fought in World War II, the Korean War, and the Vietnam War, and died from Agent Orange Disease with the rank of Sergeant. In 1964, Weatherford graduated from Dreher High School with Walker Pearce to whom he was married from 1970 until her death from multiple sclerosis in 2013. After a graduate degree from the University of South Carolina, where he also worked as an informant for the South Carolina Law Enforcement Division (SLED) in a case that later became Bursey v. Weatherford, he earned his Ph.D. in anthropology from the University of California, San Diego with additional graduate work at Frankfurt University and Duke University. He worked as legislative assistant to Senator John Glenn and taught for twenty-nine years at Macalester College in Saint Paul, Minnesota, where he held the DeWitt Wallace Distinguished Chair of Anthropology.

Weatherford's books include Indian Givers: How the Indians of the Americas Transformed the World (1988), which was translated into numerous languages; Native Roots: How the Indians Enriched America (1991), and Savages and Civilization: Who Will Survive? (1994) on the contemporary clash of world cultures. Weatherford's early books on Native Americans won the Minnesota Book Award in 1989 and in 1992. He also received the 1992 Anthropology in the Media Award from the American Anthropological Association, and the 1994 Mass Media Award of the National Conference of Christians and Jews. The American journalist and activist Gloria Steinem praised the Indian Givers book by Weatherford that it details the contributions which Native Americans made to agriculture, modern medicine and governmental institutions, overlooked and not taught in the USA.

Weatherford became more widely known for his book, The History of Money (1997), which was chosen as a selection of the Conservative Book of the Month Club. In addition, Weatherford's articles about the anthropology of 20th-century American politics and analysis of its clans, have led to his being invited as a commentator on radio and television programs, including The Today Show, ABC Evening News with Peter Jennings, Geraldo's Now It Can Be Told, Larry King, All Things Considered, Nightwatch, Tony Brown's Journal, and the Voice of America. In 2014 Bolivia honored him for this work on the indigenous people of the Americas with the Order of the Gran Mariscal de Ayacucho, Antonio José Sucre and named him Honorary Cultural Ambassador of Bolivia’s Casa de Libertad in the Constitutional Capital Sucre, and honorary citizen of Potosí.

Since the late twentieth century, Weatherford has studied and published on the cultures and history of Mongolia. Most notably for his influential book Genghis Khan and the Making of the Modern World, which debuted on the New York Times best-seller list in 2004 and helped reshape popular understanding of Mongol history. His work has received widespread acclaim for challenging traditional Western narratives and bringing greater global awareness to Mongolia’s historical impact. In 2011, the book was named CNN's "Book of the Week", further solidifying its influence and reach.

Weatherford’s contributions have been recognized with several prestigious honors. In 2006, he was awarded the Order of the Polar Star, Mongolia’s highest national honor. He received further recognition in 2010 with an honorary order from the Ministry of Foreign Affairs of Mongolia and a Medal from the President of Mongolia. In 2014, the Government of Bolivia awarded him the Order of Gran Mariscal de Ayacucho. Most notably, on November 24, 2022, Chinggis Khan’s birthday celebration in Mongolia, Weatherford became the first foreign recipient of the prestigious Order of Chinggis Khan, bestowed by the President of Mongolia.

== Books ==
- 2024: Emperor of the Seas: Kublai Khan and the Making of China
- 2016: Genghis Khan and the Quest for God: How the World's Greatest Conqueror Gave Us Religious Freedom
- 2010: The Secret History of the Mongol Queens: How the Daughters of Genghis Khan Rescued His Empire
- 2004: Genghis Khan and the Making of the Modern World
- 1997: The History of Money
- 1994: Savages and Civilization: Who Will Survive?
- 1991: Native Roots: How the Indians Enriched America
- 1988: Indian Givers: How the Indians of the Americas Transformed the World
- 1987: Narcoticos en Bolivia y los Estados Unidos – La Paz, Bolivia: Los Amigos del Libro
- 1986: Porn Row
- 1981: Tribes on the Hill
