= Ecological imperialism (disambiguation) =

Ecological imperialism might refer to:

- Ecological imperialism, an explanatory concept for the success of European colonists in America
- Interventionist green politics in the sense of green imperialism
- Neoliberal commodification of nature in the global south for the profits of the global north

== See also ==
- Green Imperialism: Colonial Expansion, Tropical Island Edens, and the Origins of Environmentalism, the environmentalism as a consequence of imperialism
