= Green imperialism =

Political phenomenon

Green imperialism (also called eco-imperialism, eco-colonialism, or environmental imperialism) is a derogatory epithet alluding to what is perceived as a Western strategy to influence the internal affairs of mostly developing nations in the name of environmentalism.

== Etymology ==
The skeptical perception of the Brundtland report by the Third World elites was summarized as green imperialism by Helge Ole Bergesen in 1988. In 1999, Deepak Lal used the term with the same meaning in his book Green Imperialism: A Prescription for Misery and War in the World's Poorest Countries. Nonetheless, the same term is used differently in Richard Grove's 1995 book Green Imperialism: Colonial Expansion, Tropical Island Edens and the Origins of Environmentalism 1600–1860. In Grove's book, it means the impact of utopian tropical islands on European data-driven scientists resulting in early environmentalism.

The first mentions of the term environmental colonialism or eco-colonialism appeared in connection with debt-for-nature swaps since 1989. It was feared that the however well-intentioned environmental protection programs could be perceived as meddlesome and imperialistic. The establishment of national parks in Africa has in some cases led to the impoverishment and displacement of local populations. Feminist and Indigenous scholars have noted that such displacement often has gendered effects, because women in rural and Indigenous communities are typically responsible for water collection, subsistence farming, and care work. When conservation areas restrict access to land or water, these gendered responsibilities become more dangerous and time-intensive, as documented in pastoralist regions of East Africa.

Eco-imperialism (or ecoimperialism) was originally an abbreviation for ecological imperialism, a concept laid out by Alfred Crosby in his book of the same name, but changed its meaning after the publication of Paul Driessen's Eco-Imperialism: Green Power Black Death in 2003. Crosby's eco-imperialism is interference with a degrading effect on the environment of targeted countries, while Driessen's eco-imperialism is interference with a degrading effect on the economy in the name of environmental improvement.

== Uses of the term ==
During the Battle of Seattle in 1999, media presented environmentalism as a new form of imperialism. The rich, developed countries impose their environmental preferences and priorities on the developing countries.

Several European governments announced boycotts of Malaysian timber due to unsustainable deforestation in Malaysia as in a publication by Mahathir Mohamad in 1999. Malaysia's Prime Minister, Mahathir Mohamed, opposed the boycotts, arguing that "we are not exploiting the forests for no good reason. We need money. We have to export wood because we need the foreign exchange without which we cannot buy what we want". Federal Land Development Authority (FELDA) accused the European Union of "economic colonisation" for banning palm oil in biofuels by 2020, in order to halt deforestation. A representative of FELDA said: "It's the same colonial attitudes, the white man imposing their rule on us from afar." In 2022, Malaysia threatened to stop the export of palm oil to EU as response to new regulations on deforestation.

In 2009, Germany called French proposal of carbon tariffs as eco-imperialism. Back then, greenhouse tariffs met strong opposition from developing countries such as India and China, since these tariffs would impact their exports.

The biofuel transnational meta-standard regulation of the European Union promotes certain sustainable fuels. However, this regulation extends beyond EU's jurisdiction and raises the issue of eco-imperialism.

In 2014, Joji Morishita, a Japanese commissioner, expressed his concerns about calls of sustainable whaling from the International Whaling Commission by the words "The whaling issue is seen as a symbol of a larger issue sometimes in Japan... You might have heard the word 'eco-imperialism'".

The approval of the World Bank loan of $3.05bn (£2.4bn loan) for 4,764 MW Medupi Power Station drew criticism for supporting increased global emissions of greenhouse gases. If the coal plant was not built, there would have been significant limitations placed on industrial development in the country.

US president's Joe Biden's "Executive Order on Tackling the Climate Crisis at Home and Abroad" is described by Asian Times as green imperialism and a hidden protectionist policy, which should protect American jobs from competition by "cheap carbon-dirty goods".

== Relation to neoliberalism ==
Eco-imperialism is sometimes described as a combination of global environmental and broad neoliberal agendas. Eco-imperialism is perceived to result in a policy of commodification of all resources of earth. This tendency of commodification of nature for environmental goals is also known as "selling nature to save it" or green grabbing. Researchers have noted that these projects often disproportionately affect Indigenous women, whose land-based cultural practices and food systems are disrupted by green-development land acquisitions. For example, in Indonesia, nickel mining for electric vehicle batteries, framed as part of global “green transitions,” has contaminated water sources and reduced access to ceremonial land for Indigenous women. Committee for the Abolition of Illegitimate Debt mentions Ouarzazate Solar Power Station as an example of such green grabbing, which was built without informing surrounding communities on pasture land and will export some of the energy to Europe.

== Political debates and surveys ==
Critical voices depreciate environmentalism as an excuse for hindering economic development of developing countries. Critics see alternative energy sources as far from realistic, and fossil fuels as the key to lifting entire populations out of poverty. Developing nations, led by Brazil, India and Singapore, opposed entangling global trade with pollution controls in 1994, calling them hidden protectionism, which will keep jobs in the developed countries and deprive poor nations of their competitive advantages. The agenda of environmentalist NGOs is called neo-colonialism and eco-imperialism in 2022 by Japan, Peru, South Africa, Kenya and Bolivia. Eco-imperialism functions as a derogatory epithet.

According to Anil Agarwal, a 1990 study by the World Resources Institute allocated responsibility for global warming to developing countries. Agarwal considered this study to be flawed, politically motivated, and unjust, and saw it more as exacerbating the North–South divide. In his 1991 paper, he called this an example of environmental colonialism and blamed U.S. overconsumption for global warming. However, a 1990s worldwide survey "Bicycles, Yes — Cheap Shoes, No" by WorldPaper showed that 66% of the participants did not agree to perceive debt-for-nature swaps as eco-colonialism.

Environmental colonialism became a subject in the book Apocalypse Never: Why Environmental Alarmism Hurts Us All by Michael Shellenberger. In The Wall Street Journal, John Tierney, a long-standing critic of environmentalism, wrote that "Shellenberger makes a persuasive case, lucidly blending research data and policy analysis with a history of the green movement and vignettes of people in poor countries suffering the consequences of 'environmental colonialism.'"

== See also ==
- Cultural imperialism
- Ecoauthoritarianism
- Ecological debt
- Ecofascism
- Environmental justice
- Environmental racism
- Greenpeace Arctic Sunrise ship case
- White savior
