= Ecological Imperialism (book) =

1986 book by Alfred W. Crosby

Ecological Imperialism: The Biological Expansion of Europe, 900-1900
- Author: Alfred W. Crosby
- Language: English
- Series: Studies in Environment and History
- Genre: Environmental history, geography
- Published: 1986 (1st edition)
- Publisher: Cambridge University Press
- Pages: 408
- ISBN: 9780521837323

Ecological Imperialism: The Biological Expansion of Europe, 900-1900 is a 1986 book by environmental historian Alfred W. Crosby. The book builds on Crosby's earlier study, The Columbian Exchange, in which he described the complex global transfer of organisms that accompanied European colonial endeavors.

In Ecological Imperialism, Crosby seeks to explain why European colonialists were successful in establishing settler societies in temperate regions around the globe. He argues that this was due principally to the "portmanteau biota" – disease microbes, weeds, domesticated plants, and animals – that accompanied Europeans, devastating local populations and significantly re-making local landscapes. The book advanced understandings of the environmental impacts of global colonialism and re-shaped understandings of the colonial experience itself, placing environmental factors at its center. Crosby introduced "ecological imperialism" as an explanatory concept that points out the contribution of European biological species such as animals, plants and pathogens in the success of European colonists.

The book is considered a foundational text in the field of environmental history and has been influential in many other fields, including postcolonial studies. It was awarded the 1987 Ralph Waldo Emerson Award.

== Contents ==
Crosby begins by pointing out that the populations of what he calls the "Neo-Europes" of temperate zones are primarily composed of European descendants. He asks why there are such large concentrations of Europeans in these lands which are so distant from Europe. Furthermore, why have these locations been able to routinely produce large food surpluses and why are many of the countries located in these regions able to consistently be among the world's largest exporters of food?

Although Europeans as a whole were reluctant to leave the familiarity of their homelands to start a new life abroad until the early 19th century, the Neo-Europes experienced a great influx of European settlers between 1820 and 1930. According to Crosby, this mass emigration was caused by conditions within Europe at the time, such as "population explosion and a resulting shortage of cultivable land, national rivalries, persecution of minorities", alongside "the application of steam power to ocean and land travel". But what was so appealing about the Neo-Europes to warrant being selected as the primary locations for European expansion?

Crosby's explanation for the success of European imperialists is biogeographical. Europe and the Neo-Europes all share similar latitudes. That is, Europe and the Neo-Europes "are all completely or at least two-thirds in the temperate zones, north and south, which is to say that they have roughly similar climates". This is significant because the plants and animals Europeans have traditionally relied upon for sustenance tend to require a warm-to-cool climate that receives 50 to 150 centimeters of annual precipitation to flourish. Therefore, just as farming was able to spread from the Fertile Crescent, east and west, without much difficulty, replacing the hunter-gatherer lifestyle along the way, so was it able to in the Neo-Europes.

Before this could take place, because the indigenous flora and fauna in the Neo-Europes were different from those located in Europe, the foreign biota brought to the New World by Europeans would have to compete with the local ones to survive. This would ultimately result in the complete devastation of the native floras and faunas. Crosby says: "the regions that today export more foodstuffs of European provenance – grains and meats – than any other lands on earth had no wheat, barley, rye, cattle, pigs, sheep, or goats whatsoever five hundred years ago".

Rather than give credence to claims of innate European superiority and the like, Crosby explains the relative ease with which Europeans conquered the Neo-Europes as being a product of biological and ecological processes. One of the major contributors to European domination was disease, which is a natural byproduct of human interaction with animals. Consequently, when Europeans shifted from being hunter/gatherers to being farmers who settled in large, stationary communities and domesticated small animals, they exposed themselves to conditions that engendered diseases that would later assist them in conquering the Neo-Europes. Some such carriers of diseases were the mice, rats, roaches, houseflies, and worms that were able to accumulate in these urban settings.

Because Europeans were living in an environment where they were in close contact with domestic animals and the germs that accompany them, the same germs from which many of the devastating diseases of humans have sprung, they were constantly being subjected to disease. And though millions of lives were lost when diseases like the Black Death ravaged Europe during the Middle Ages, a natural consequence of these frequent epidemics was a population that had built up a resistance to these diseases. Each epidemic would spare some individuals who were biologically more capable of resisting the virus. After undergoing this process for a number of centuries, the entire population eventually acquired at least some minor immunological defense against diseases such as measles and smallpox. Crosby addresses the first subjugation of lands nearest Europe, in his chapter entitled, The Fortunate Isles, which documents the history of the European waves of attacks on the Azores, Madeira Islands, and Canary Islands to bring them under European suzerainty, and their earliest efforts to enslave their populations and restructure their wildlife.(p. 70-103)

Because the majority of the native populations to the Neo-Europes were still participating in hunting/gathering and did not interact with animals in the same manner as Europeans, they were never exposed to such diseases. Therefore, "When the isolation of the New World was broken ... the American Indian met for the first time his most hideous enemy: not the white man nor his black servant, but the invisible killers which those men brought in their blood and breath." Because the Europeans arrived in the Neo-Europes with diseases that were absolutely new to those locations, they had an enormous advantage over the indigenous peoples and the consequences were overwhelming.

By 3,000 years ago, give or take a millennium or so, "superman,* the human of Old World civilization, had appeared on earth. He was not a figure with bulging muscles, nor necessarily with bulging forehead. He knew how to raise surpluses of food and fiber; he knew how to tame and exploit several species of animals; he knew how to use the wheel to spin out a thread or make a pot or move cumbersome weights; his fields were plagued with thistles and his granaries with rodents; he had sinuses that throbbed in wet weather, a recurring problem with dysentery, and enervating burden of worms, an impressive assortment of genetic and acquired adaptations to diseases anciently endemic to Old World civilizations, and an immune system of such experience and sophistication as to make him the template for all the humans who would be tempted or obliged to follow the path he pioneered some 8,000 to 10,000 years ago.

== Legacy ==
Ecological Imperialism built directly on Crosby's earlier work on the Columbian exchange, with Crosby remarking that Ecological Imperialism "took The Columbian Exchange up another notch in scope and abstraction." It is part of a long scholarly legacy that helped to re-shape how historians and others have understood global historical and environmental change. Ecological Imperialism, along with The Columbian Exchange, is considered a foundational text in the field of Environmental history, and the concept at its core - the theory of Ecological imperialism - has been called "one of the most enduring models of past global environmental change."

The book has been influential in other fields, including Postcolonial studies. Scholars have drawn upon and refined the concept in the decades since the book was published, applying it to regions outside of the Neo-Europes that drew Crosby's attention. Ecological Imperialism has been cited as a key inspiration for popular works such as Jared Diamond's 1997 Pulitzer Prize-winning book Guns, Germs, and Steel and journalist Charles C. Mann's books 1491 and 1493. Mann has related that he was encouraged by Crosby to write the latter book after Mann had urged Crosby to write an updated edition of Ecological Imperialism.

== Editions ==
The first edition of Ecological Imperialism was published by Cambridge University Press in 1986. A second edition was published by Cambridge in 2004 with a new preface from Crosby.

- Ecological Imperialism: The Biological Expansion of Europe, 900-1900, 1986, ISBN 0-521-32009-7 (hardback), ISBN 0-521-45690-8 (paperback)
- Ecological Imperialism: The Biological Expansion of Europe, 900-1900, second edition, 2004, ISBN 0-521-83732-4 (hardback), ISBN 0-521-54618-4 (paperback)

== See also ==
- 1493: Uncovering the New World Columbus Created
- Colonisation (biology)
- Alfred W. Crosby
- The Columbian Exchange
- Ecological imperialism
- Environmental racism
- Genocide of indigenous peoples
- Locally unwanted land use
- Richard Grove, author of Green Imperialism (1995)
