= Columbian exchange =

Transfers between the Old and New Worlds

The Columbian exchange transferred plants, animals, diseases, and culture.

New WorldOld World

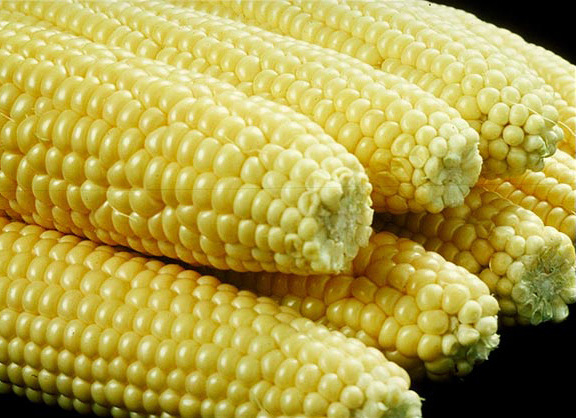
Maize ▶

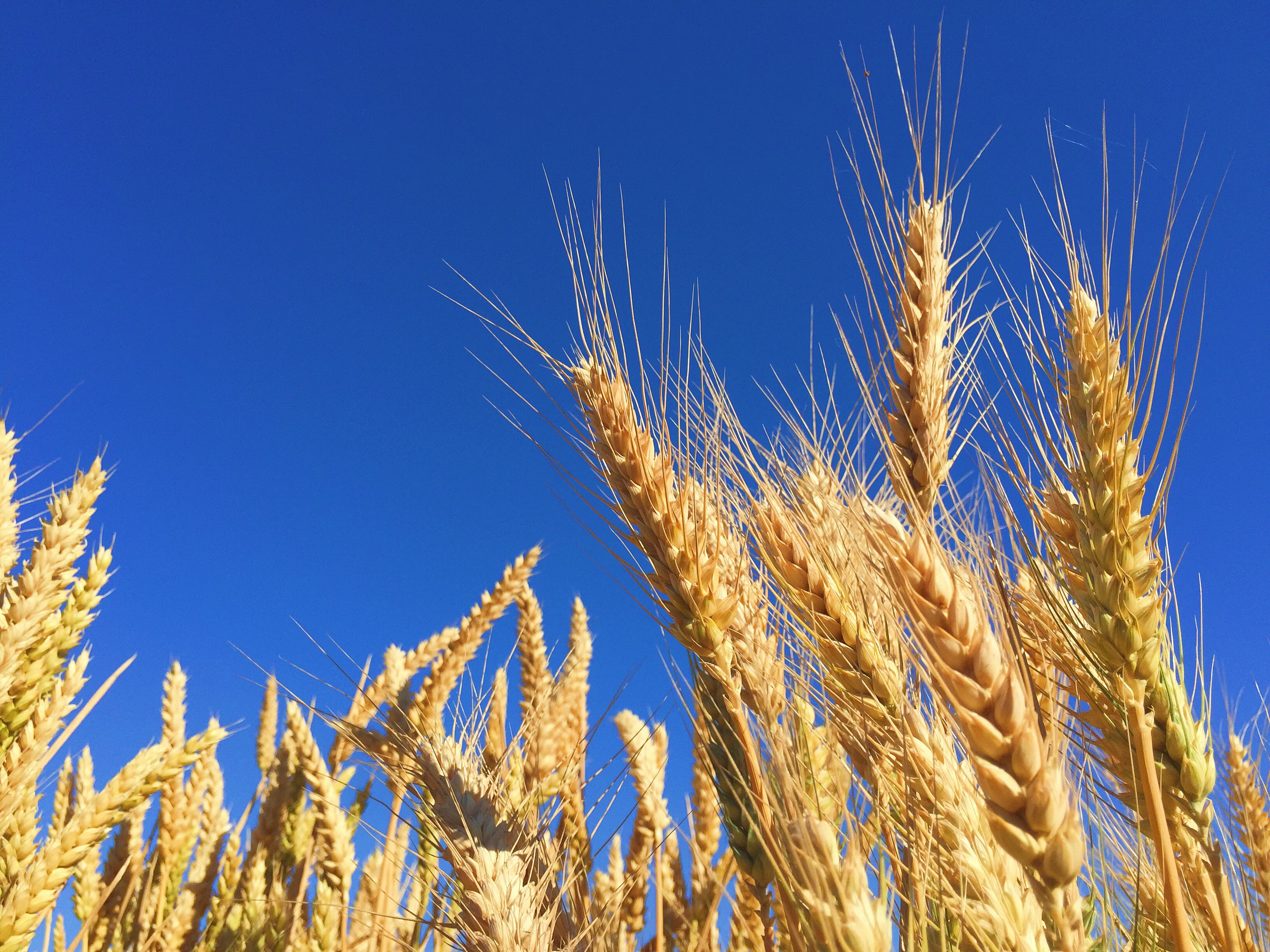
◀ Wheat

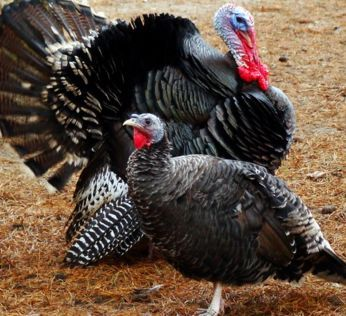
Turkey ▶

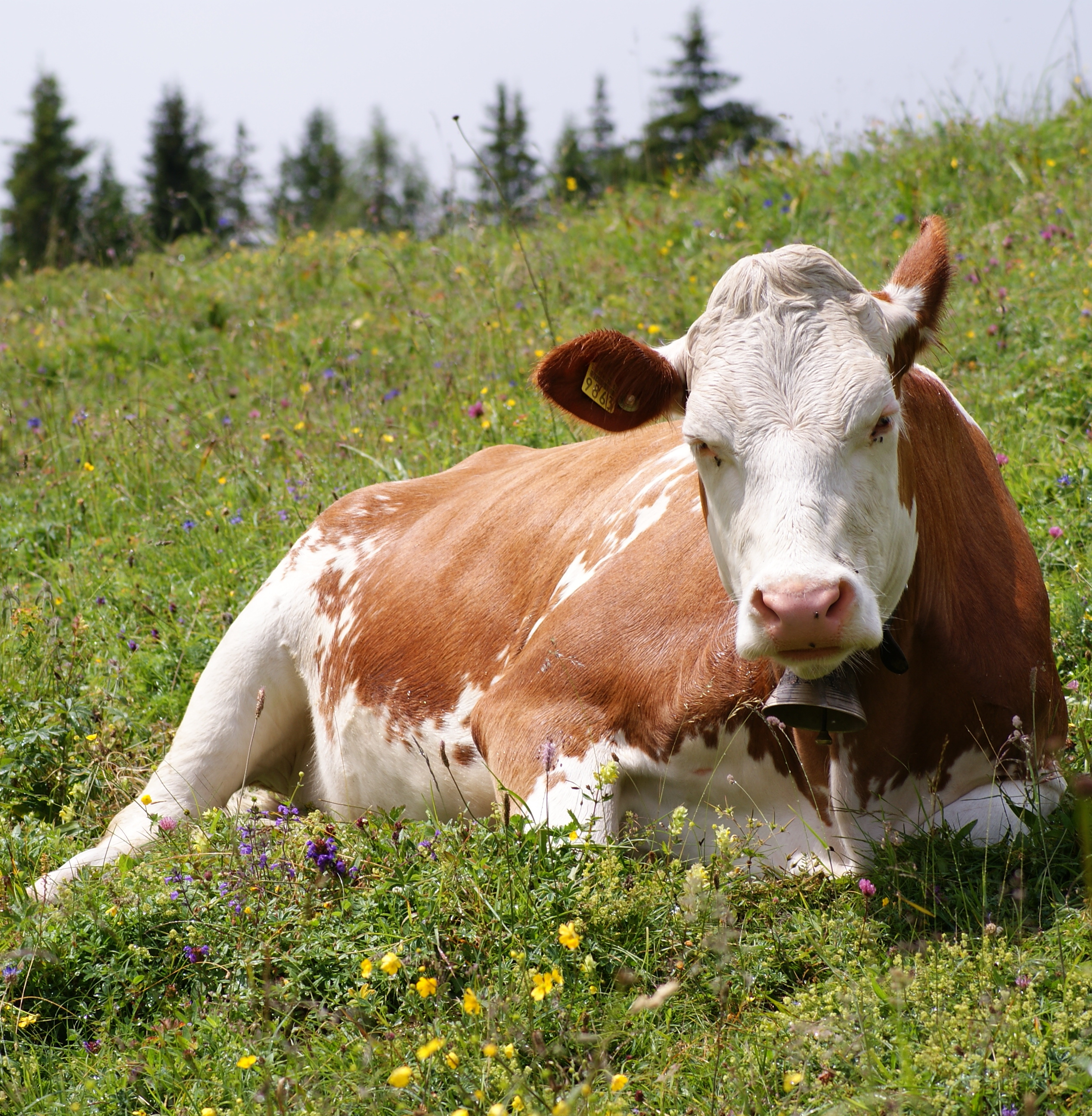
◀ Cattle

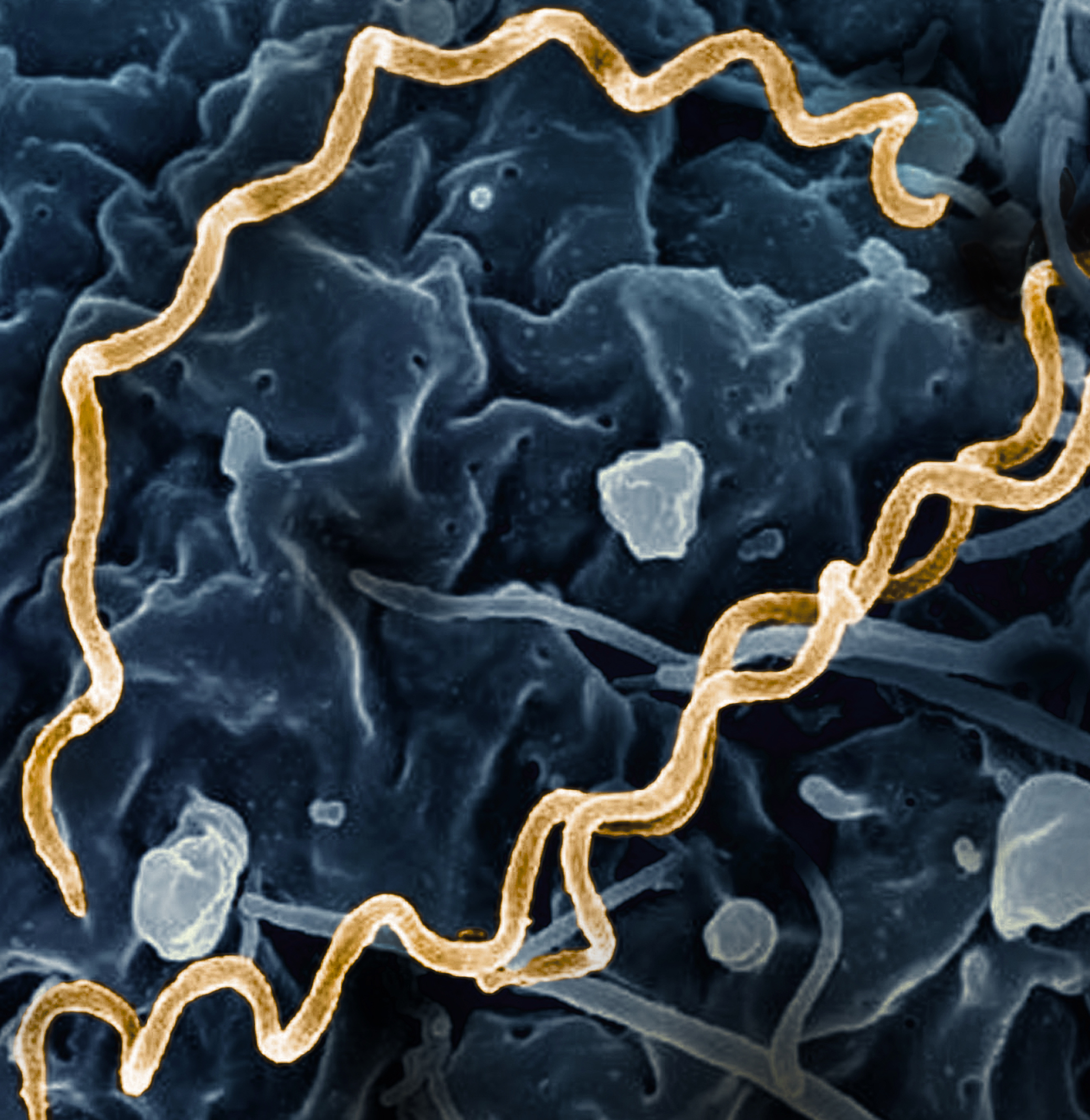
Syphilis ▶

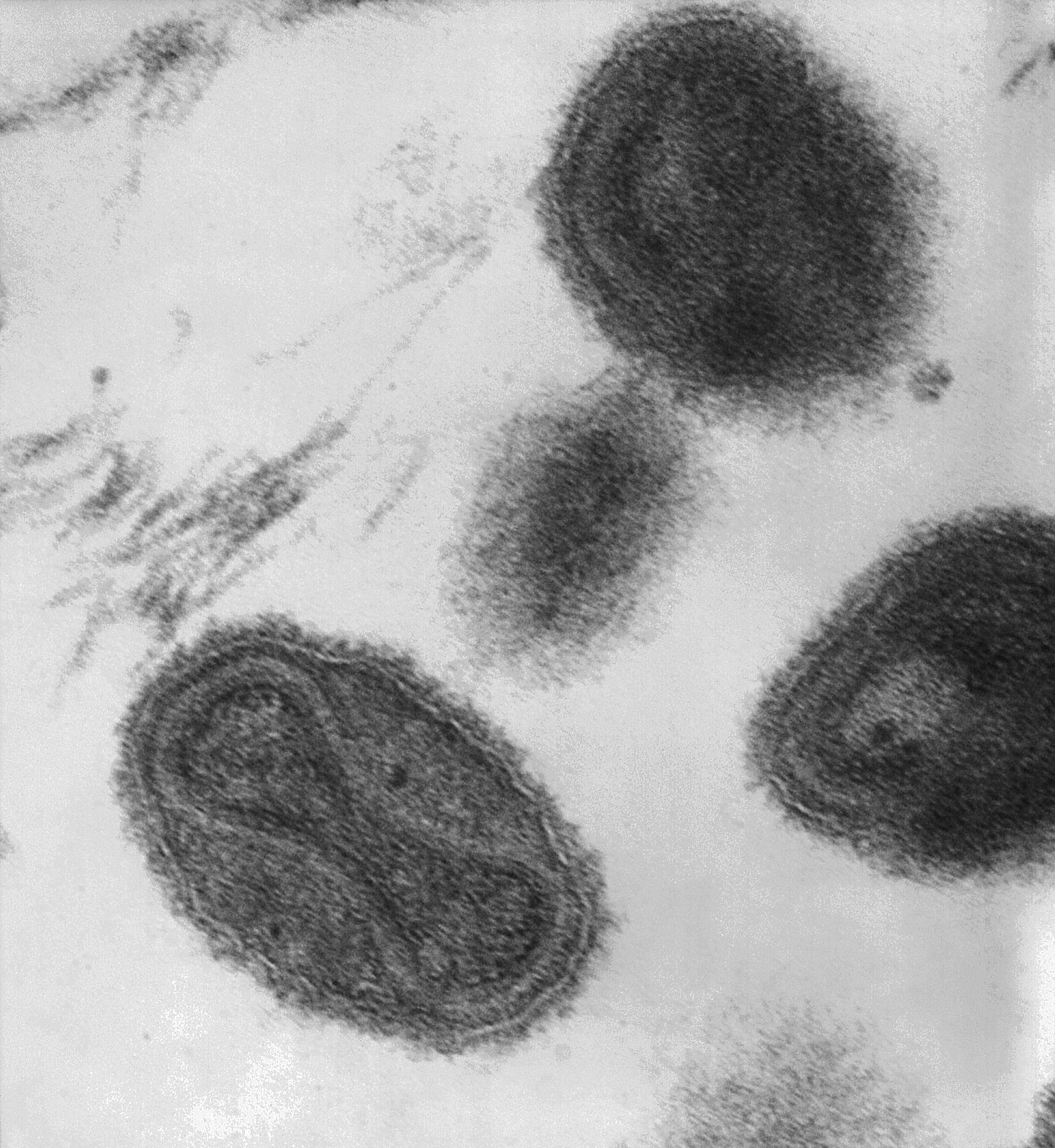
◀ Smallpox

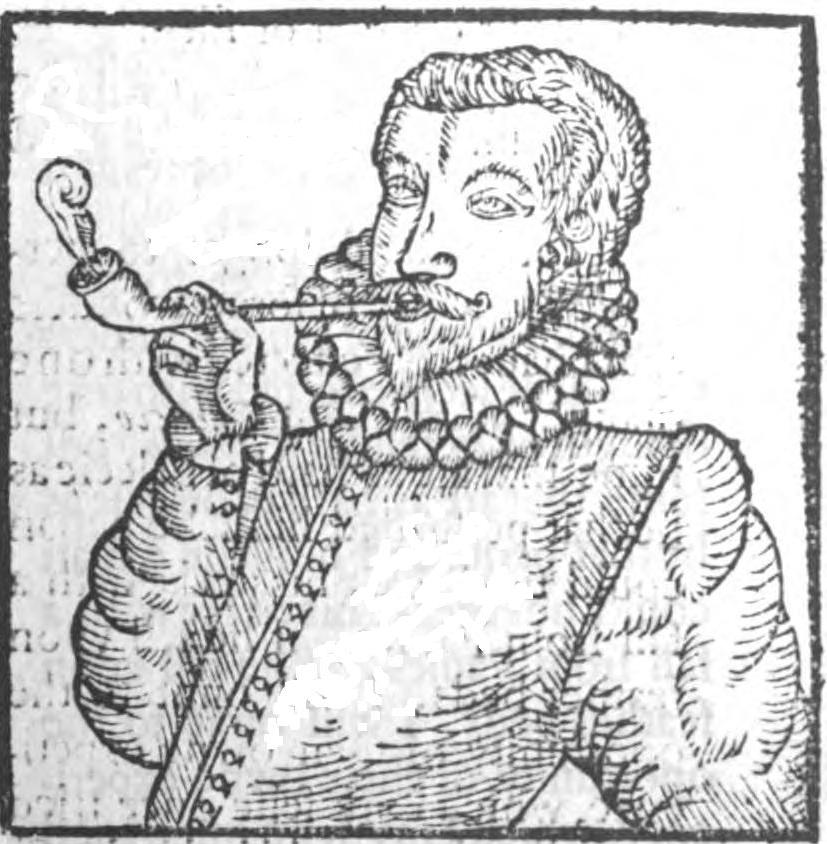
Smoking ▶

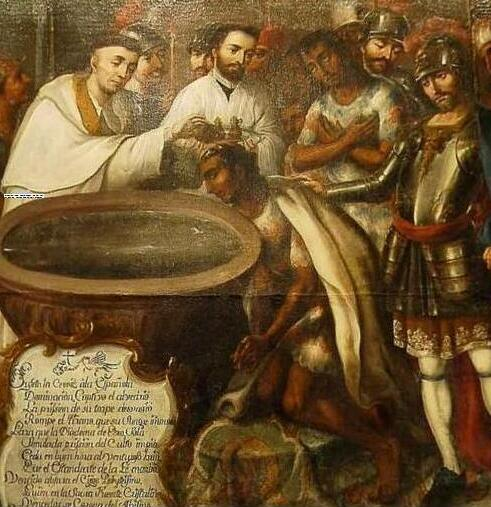
◀ Christianity

The Columbian exchange, also known as the Columbian interchange, was the widespread transfer of plants, animals, and diseases between the New World (the Americas) in the Western Hemisphere, and the Old World (Afro-Eurasia) in the Eastern Hemisphere, from the late 15th century on. It is named after the Italian explorer Christopher Columbus and is related to the European colonization and global trade following his 1492 voyage. Some of the exchanges were deliberate while others were unintended. Communicable diseases of Old World origin resulted in an 80 to 95 percent reduction in the Indigenous population of the Americas from the 15th century onwards, and their near extinction in the Caribbean.

The cultures of both hemispheres were significantly affected by the migration of people, both free and enslaved, from the Old World to the New. European colonists and African slaves replaced Indigenous populations across the Americas, to varying degrees. The number of Africans taken to the New World was far greater than the number of Europeans moving there in the first three centuries after Columbus.

The new contacts among the global population resulted in the interchange of many species of crops and livestock, which supported increases in food production and population in the Old World. American crops such as maize, potatoes, tomatoes, tobacco, cassava, sweet potatoes, and chili peppers became important crops around the world. Old World rice, wheat, sugar cane, and livestock, among other crops, became important in the New World.

The term was first used in 1972 by the American historian Alfred W. Crosby in his environmental history book The Columbian Exchange. It was rapidly adopted by other historians and by journalists.

== Etymology ==
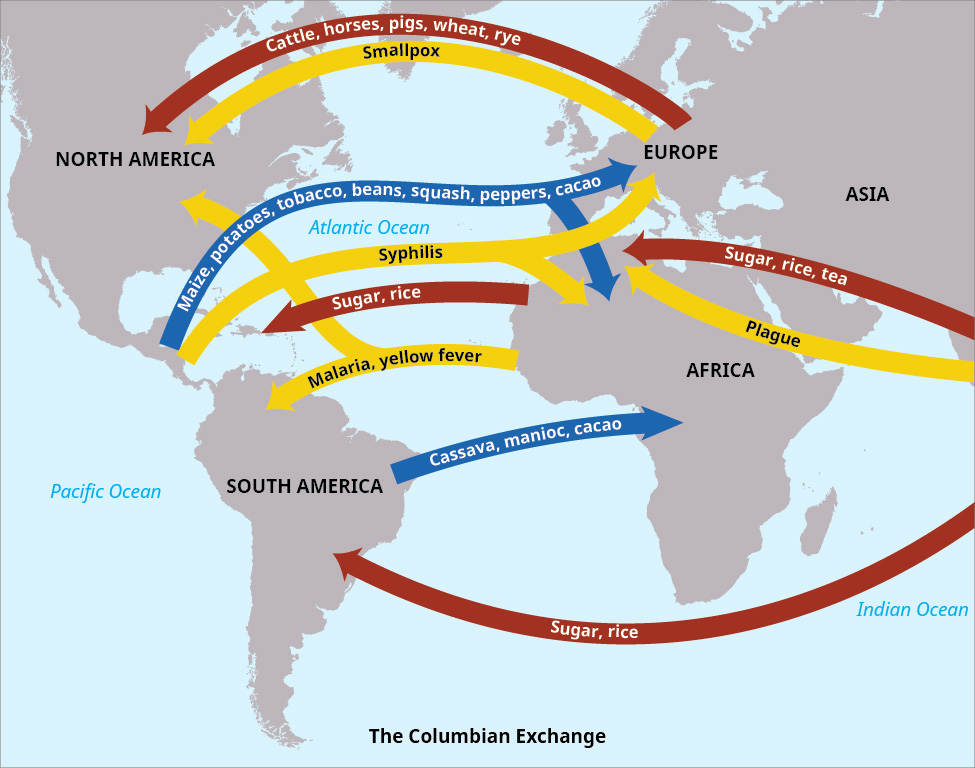
The Columbian exchange of crop plants, livestock, and diseases went in both directions between the Old World and the New World.

In 1972, Alfred W. Crosby, an American historian at the University of Texas at Austin, published the book The Columbian Exchange, thus coining the term. His primary focus was mapping the biological and cultural transfers that occurred between the Old and New Worlds. He studied the effects of Columbus's voyages between the two – specifically, the global diffusion of crops, seeds, and plants from the New World to the Old, which radically transformed agriculture in both regions.

His research made a lasting contribution to the way scholars understand the variety of contemporary ecosystems that arose due to these transfers. His 1986 book Ecological Imperialism presented further research in the field.

== Background ==
The scientific consensus is that humans first came to the New World from Siberia thousands of years ago. There is little additional evidence of contacts between the peoples of the Old World and those of the New World, although the literature speculating on pre-Columbian trans-oceanic journeys is extensive. The first inhabitants of the New World brought with them domestic dogs. The medieval explorations, visits, and brief residence of the Norsemen in Greenland, Newfoundland, and Vinland in the late 10th century and 11th century had no known effect on the Americas, though the small perennial Rumex acetosella (sheep's sorrel) appeared in Greenland at that time.

Many scientists accept that possible contact between Polynesians and coastal peoples in South America around the year 1200 resulted in genetic similarities and the adoption by Polynesians of an American crop, the sweet potato. However, it was only with the first voyage of the Italian explorer Christopher Columbus and his crew to the Americas in 1492 that the Columbian exchange began, resulting in major transformations in the cultures and livelihoods of the peoples in both hemispheres.

== Biological exchanges ==
=== Of plants ===
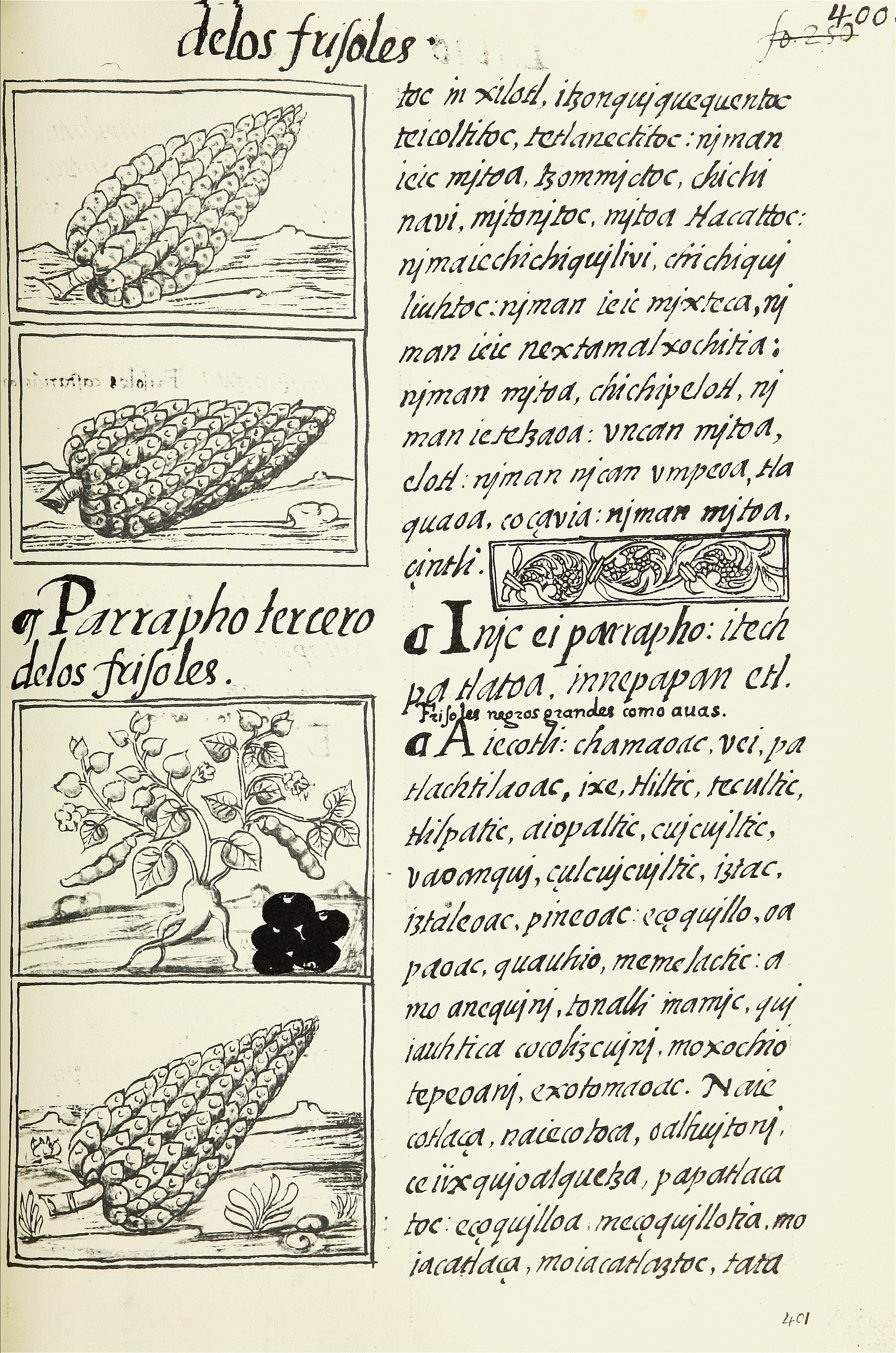
The 16th century Florentine Codex by the Spanish friar Bernardino de Sahagún provided an early depiction of maize, one of the plants the Spanish brought to the Old World.

Because of the new trading resulting from the Columbian exchange, several plants native to the Americas spread around the world, including potatoes, maize, tomatoes, and tobacco. Before 1500, potatoes were not grown outside of South America. By the 18th century, they were cultivated and consumed widely in Europe and had become important crops in both India and North America. Potatoes eventually became an important staple food in the diets of many Europeans, contributing to an estimated 12 to 25% of the population growth in Afro-Eurasia between 1700 and 1900. The introduction of the potato to the Old World accounts for 47 percent of the increase in urbanization between 1700 and 1900. Cassava was introduced from South America by the Portuguese in the 16th century, and gradually replaced sorghum and millet as Africa's most important food crop. Spanish colonizers of the 16th century introduced new staple crops to Asia from the Americas, including maize and sweet potatoes, contributing to population growth there. On a larger scale, the introduction of potatoes and maize to the Old World improved people's nutrition throughout the Eurasian landmass, enabling more varied and abundant food production.

The discovery of the Americas provided the Old World with new arable landscapes suitable for growing sugarcane and coffee. Coffee, introduced in the Americas circa 1720 from Africa and the Middle East, and sugarcane, introduced from the Indian subcontinent to the Spanish West Indies, subsequently became the primary commodity crops and exported goods of extensive Latin American plantations. Introduced to India by the Portuguese, chili peppers and potatoes from South America in turn became integral parts of Indian cuisine, and starting the process of making curry an international dish.

Because crops traveled widely but at least initially their endemic fungi did not, for a limited time yields were somewhat higher in the new regions to which they were introduced, a form of ecological release or "yield honeymoon". However, the exchange of pathogens has continued alongside globalization, and crops have declined back toward their endemic yields.

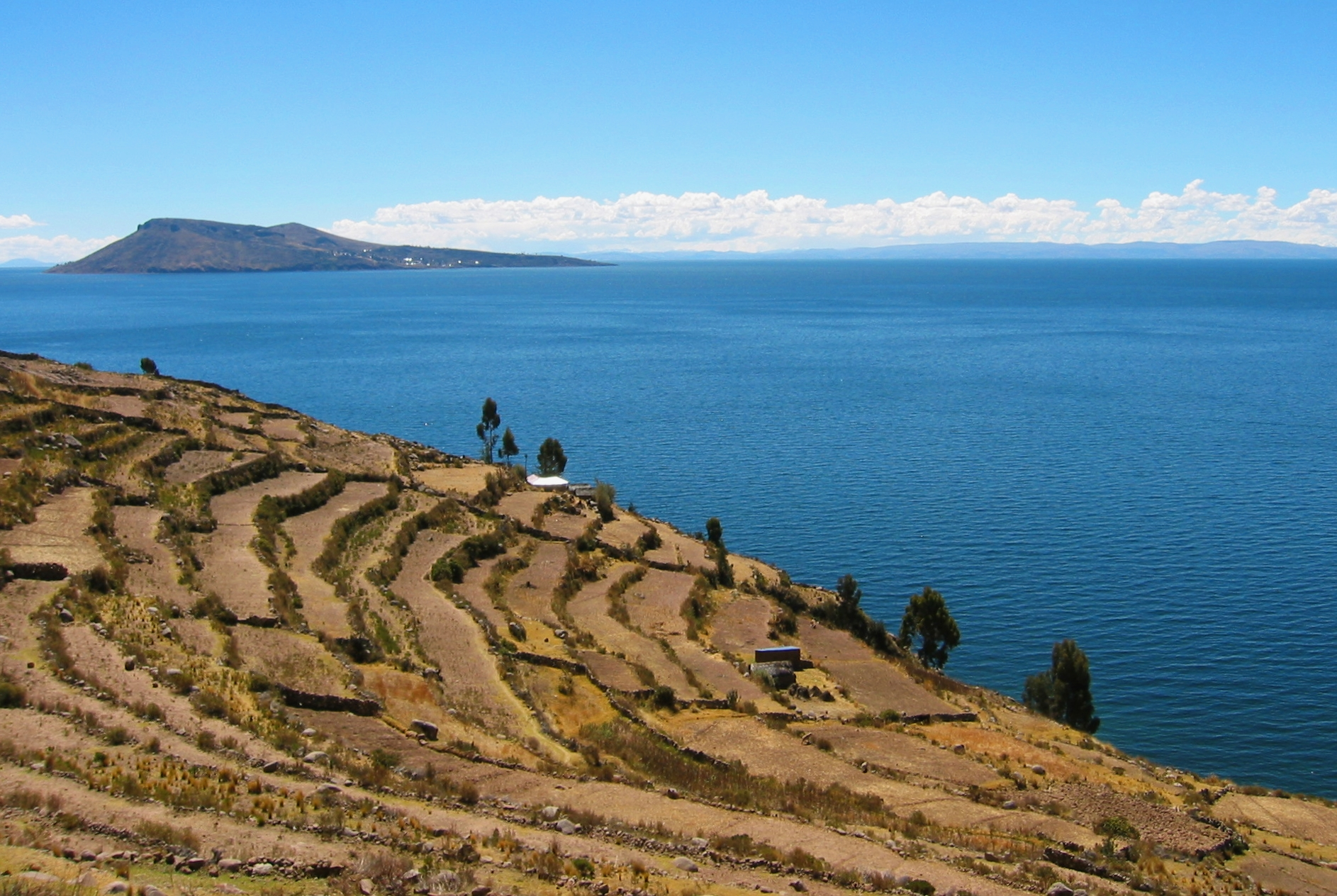
Andenes terraces on Taquile are used to grow traditional Andean staples such as quinoa and potatoes, alongside wheat—a European introduction.

The Spanish were the first Europeans to grow cacao, in 1590. Though cacao was usually consumed by European populations in the form of sweets and was at first treated as an expensive luxury item, chocolate helped with fatigue and provided energy. As for vanilla, the pods of the plant after chemical treatment acquired an aroma, which was then used both in cooking and in perfumery.

Post-Columbian transfers of cultivated plants
Old World to New World	New World to Old World
almond; apple; cabbage (many varieties); citrus (orange, lemon, etc.); coffee; lettuce; melon; oat; olive; onion; peach; pear; radish; rice; rye; sorghum; soybean; sugarcane and sugar beet; turnip; wheat	avocado; cassava (manioc, tapioca); chili pepper; cocoa bean (cacao); cotton (long-staple species); cranberry (bearberry species); guava (common); maize (corn); papaya; peanut; pineapple; potato; squashes, including pumpkin; sunflower; sweet potato; tobacco; tomato; custard apple; Sapodilla

Rice, including both Oryza glaberrima independently domesticated in West Africa and Oryza sativa naturalized in the Mediterranean, became widely planted in the New World; European planters there relied upon the skills of African slaves to cultivate it. Georgia, South Carolina, Cuba, and Puerto Rico were major centers of rice production during the colonial era. Enslaved Africans brought their knowledge of water control, milling, winnowing, and other agrarian practices to the fields. This widespread knowledge among African slaves eventually made rice a staple food in the New World.

Citrus fruits and grapes were brought to the Americas from the Mediterranean. At first, planters struggled to adapt these crops to New World climates, but by the late 19th century they were cultivated consistently. Bananas were introduced into the Americas in the 16th century by Portuguese sailors, who brought them from West Africa. Despite this early introduction, they were little consumed in the Americas as late as the 1880s, when large plantations were established in the Caribbean. The Manila galleon trading network introduced American plants such as chayote and papaya into Southeast Asia; these were incorporated into the cuisines there.

Long before the arrival of the Spaniards, cultivators brought wild tomatoes from Central America to South America. Soon after Columbus's visit, tomatoes were brought to Spain, and from there to other European countries, including Italy. In 1544, Pietro Andrea Mattioli, a Tuscan physician and botanist, wrote that the tomato was eaten fried in oil there. The first Italian cookbook to include tomato sauce, Lo Scalco alla Moderna ("The Modern Steward"), was written by Italian chef Antonio Latini and was published in two volumes in 1692 and 1694. In 1790, the use of tomato sauce with pasta appeared for the first time, in the Italian cookbook L'Apicio Moderno ("The Modern Apicius"), by chef Francesco Leonardi.

Alongside the intentional introductions of cultivated plants that were Crosby's focus, many wild plants including weeds of cultivation, such as dandelions and grasses, were transferred in both directions, permanently affecting the ecology of many parts of the world.

=== Of animals ===
Initially, the Columbian exchange of animals largely went in one direction, from Europe to the New World, as the Eurasian regions had domesticated many more animals. Horses, donkeys, mules, pigs, cattle, sheep, goats, chickens, dogs, cats, and bees were rapidly adopted by native peoples for transport, food, and other uses. The Plains Indians, for example, made extensive use of horses for hunting.

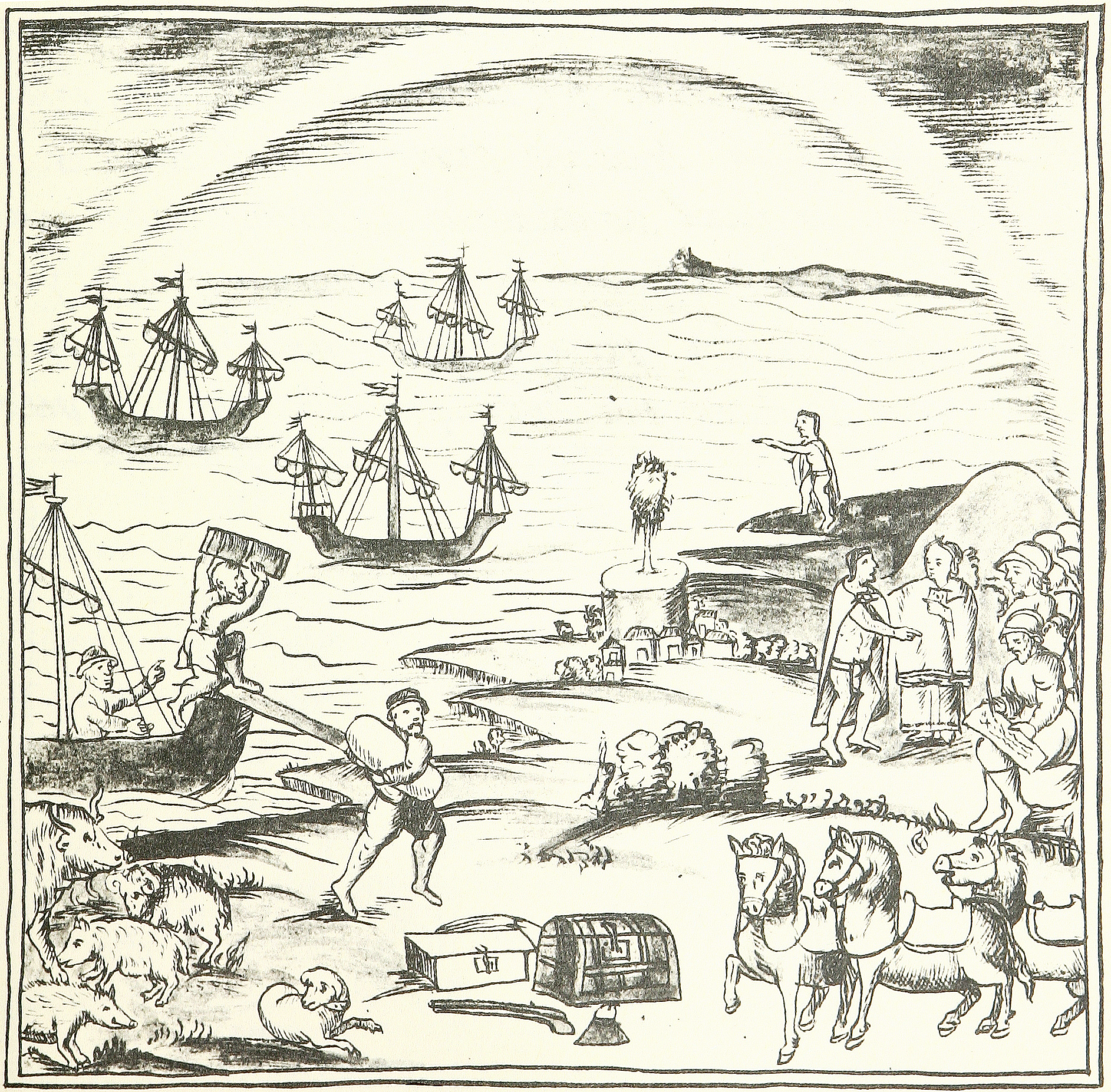
Spanish conquest of Mexico, 1519–1521, with horses, pigs, cattle, and sheep being landed from ships. Florentine Codex.

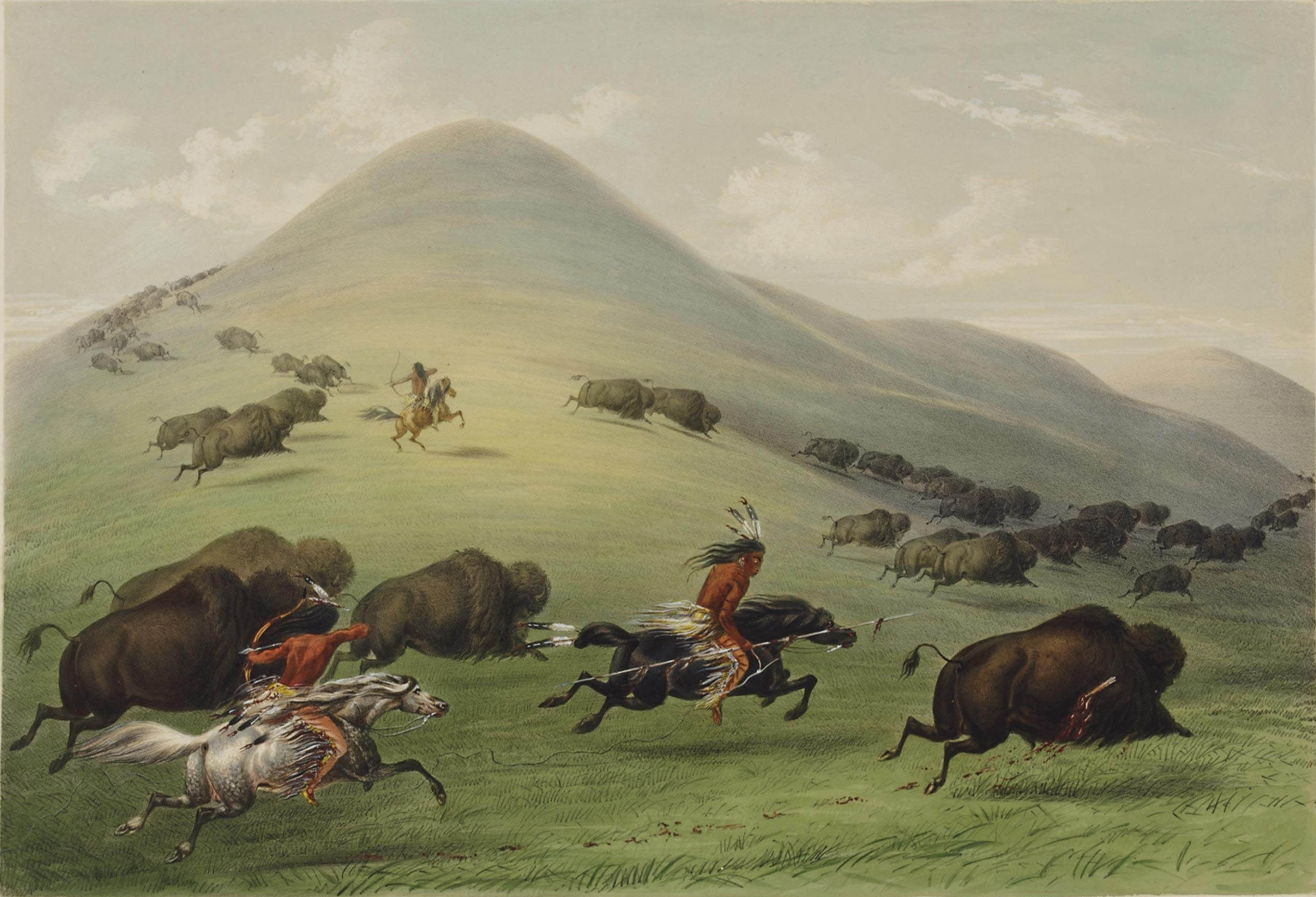
Native Americans learned to use horses, dramatically expanding their hunting range. George Catlin, 1844.

Post-Columbian transfers of domestic animals
Old World to New World	New World to Old World
cattle; chicken; large dog; donkey; duck (domesticated mallard); goat; horse; pig; sheep	Muscovy duck; turkey

While mesoamerican peoples, Mayas in particular, already practiced apiculture, producing wax and honey from a variety of bees, such as Melipona or Trigona, European bees (Apis mellifera)—were more productive, delivering a honey with less water content and allowing for easier extraction from beehives—were introduced in New Spain, becoming an important part of farming production.

The Mapuche of Araucanía were fast to adopt the horse from the Spanish, and improve their military capabilities as they fought the Arauco War against Spanish colonizers. Until the arrival of the Spanish, the Mapuches had largely maintained chilihueques (llamas) as livestock. The Spanish introduction of sheep caused some competition between the two domesticated species. Anecdotal evidence of the mid-17th century shows that by then sheep far outnumbered llamas. The decline of llamas reached a point in the late 18th century when only the Mapuche from Mariquina and the Huequén next to Angol raised the species. In the Chiloé Archipelago the introduction of pigs by the Spanish proved a success. They could feed on the abundant shellfish and algae exposed by the large tides.

In the other direction, the turkey, from North America, and the Muscovy duck, from Mexico and South America, were New World domestic animals transferred to Europe.

=== Of diseases ===
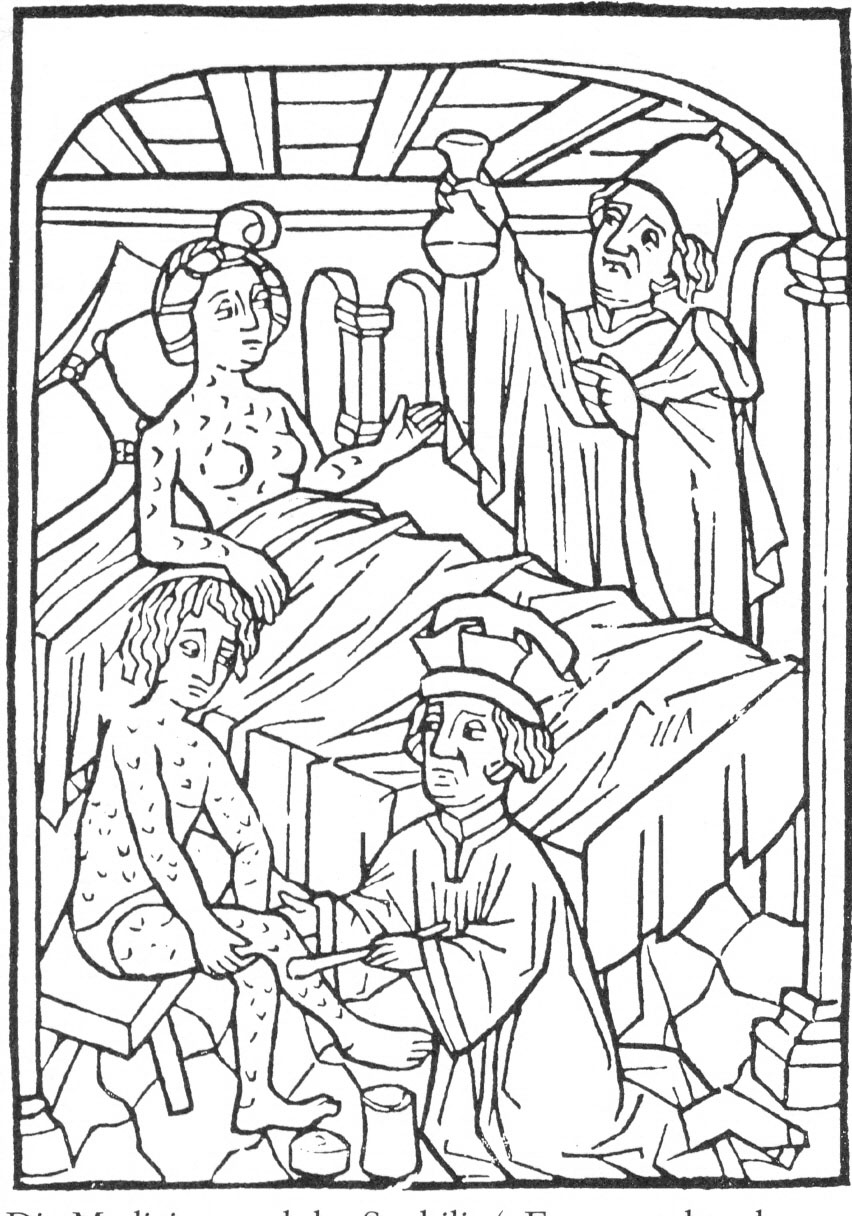
An early Old World medical illustration of people with syphilis, Vienna, 1498

The first manifestation of the Columbian exchange may have been the spread of syphilis from the native people of the Caribbean Sea to Europe. The history of syphilis has been well-studied, but the origin of the disease remains a subject of debate. There are two primary hypotheses: one proposes that syphilis was carried to Europe from the Americas by the crew of Christopher Columbus in the early 1490s, while the other proposes that syphilis previously existed in Europe but went unrecognized. The first written descriptions of syphilis in the Old World came in 1493. The first large outbreak of syphilis in Europe occurred in 1494–1495 among the army of Charles VIII during its invasion of Naples. Many of the crew members who had served with Columbus had joined this army. After the victory, Charles's largely mercenary army returned to their respective homes, spreading "the Great Pox" across Europe, which killed up to five million people.

The Columbian exchange of diseases toward the New World was far deadlier. The peoples of the Americas had previously had no exposure to Old World diseases and little or no immunity to them. An epidemic of swine influenza beginning in 1493 killed many of the Taino people inhabiting Caribbean islands. The pre-contact population of the island of Hispaniola was probably at least 500,000, but by 1526, fewer than 500 were still alive. Spanish exploitation was part of the cause of the near-extinction of the native people.

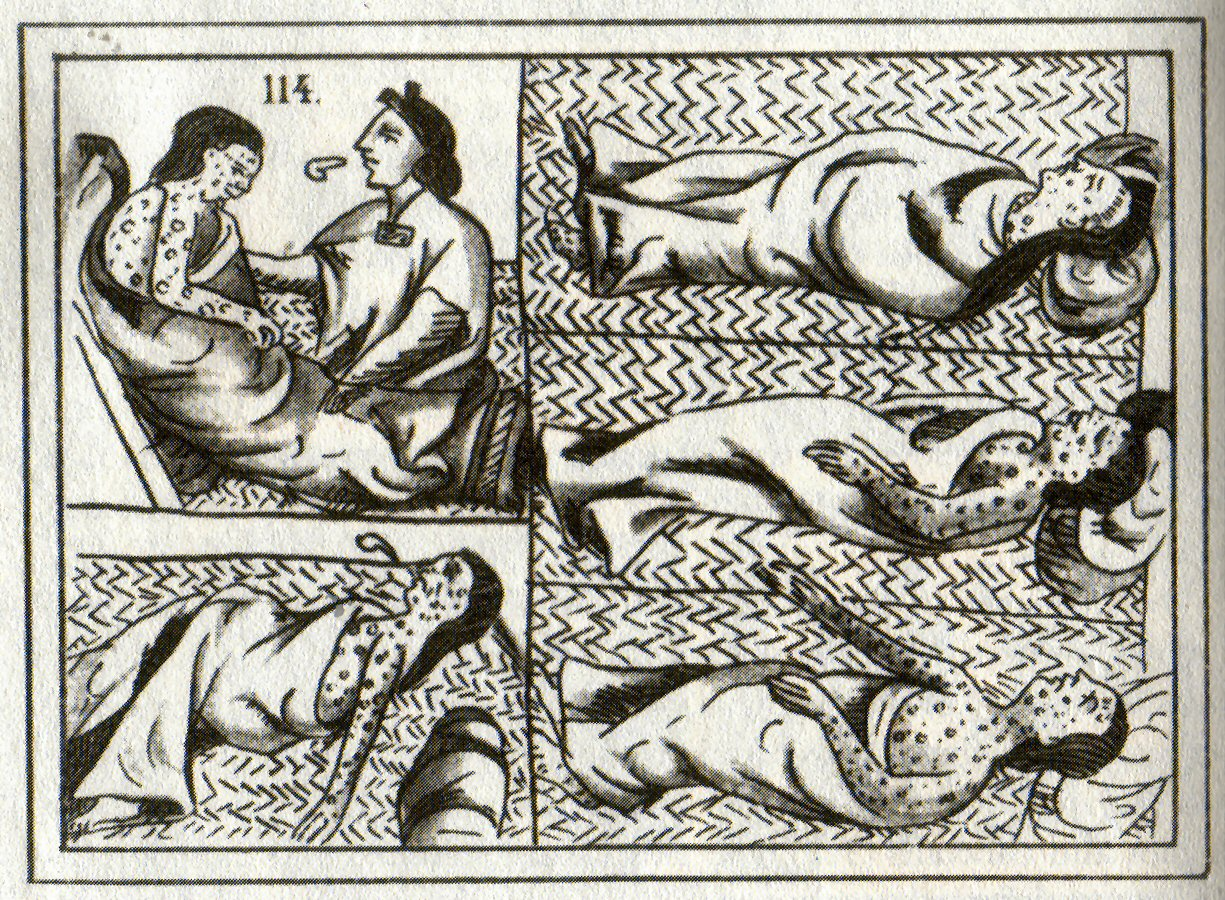
Sixteenth-century Aztec drawings of victims of smallpox in the Florentine Codex

In 1518, smallpox was first recorded in the Americas and became the deadliest imported Old World disease. Forty percent of the 200,000 people living in the Aztec capital of Tenochtitlan, later Mexico City, are estimated to have died of smallpox in 1520 during the war of the Aztecs with conquistador Hernán Cortés. Epidemics, possibly of smallpox, spread from Central America, devastating the population of the Inca Empire a few years before the arrival of the Spanish. The ravages of Old World diseases and Spanish exploitation reduced the Mexican population from an estimated 20 million to barely more than a million in the 16th century.

Post-Columbian transfers of diseases
Old World to New World	New World to Old World
bubonic plague; chickenpox; cholera; diphtheria; influenza; leprosy; malaria; measles; mumps; smallpox; typhoid fever; typhus; yellow fever	syphilis (probably)

The Indigenous population of Peru decreased from about 9 million in the pre-Columbian era, to 600,000 in 1620. An estimated 80–95 percent of the Native American population died in epidemics within the first 100–150 years following 1492. Nunn and Qian also refer to the calculations of the scientist David Cook: in some cases no one survived due to diseases. The deadliest Old World diseases in the Americas were smallpox, measles, whooping cough, chicken pox, bubonic plague, typhus, and malaria. Yellow fever was brought to the Americas from Africa, probably by the slave trade. Many people in Africa had acquired immunity. Europeans suffered higher rates of death than did people of African descent when exposed to yellow fever in the Americas, as numerous epidemics swept the colonies and sugar plantations.

On the other hand, European exploration of tropical areas was aided by the New World discovery of quinine, the first effective treatment for malaria. Cinchona trees from the Andes were processed and quinine was obtained from their bark. Europeans suffered from this disease, but some Indigenous populations had developed at least partial resistance to it. In Africa, resistance to malaria has been associated with other genetic changes among sub-Saharan Africans and their descendants, which can cause sickle-cell disease. The resistance of sub-Saharan Africans to malaria in the southern United States and the Caribbean made Africa-sourced slavery more profitable in those regions.

== Cultural exchanges ==
=== Clash of cultures ===
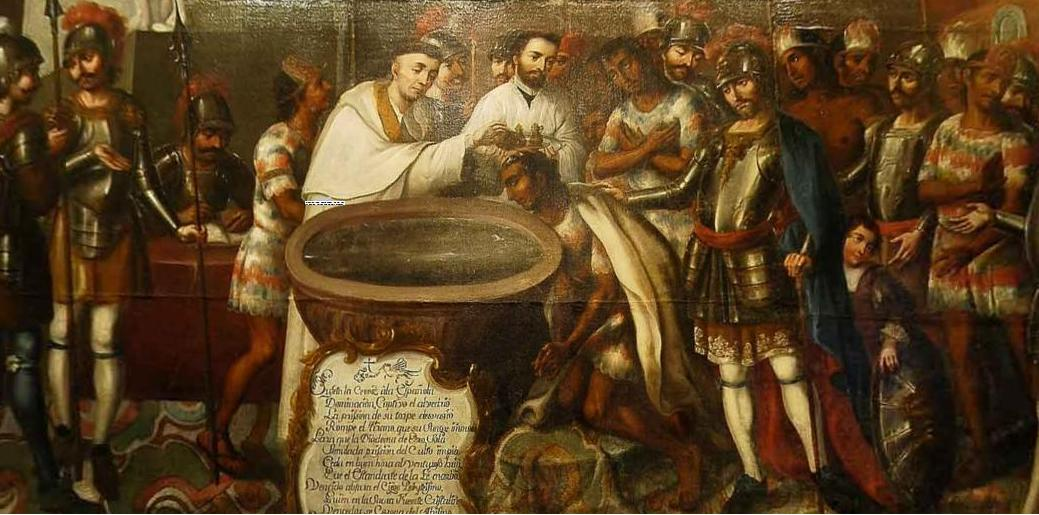
The evangelization of Mexico

The movement of people between New and Old Worlds caused cultural exchanges, extending to what Pieter Emmer has called "a clash of cultures". This involved the transfer of European values to Indigenous cultures, such as the concept of private property in regions where property was often viewed as communal, universal monogamy (though many Indigenous peoples were already monogamous), the role of women and children in the social system, and different concepts of labor, including slavery. Christianity was brought to the Indigenous peoples by priests and monks from Europe. Tobacco was used in the Old World as medicine and currency, while in the New World it was the subject of religious customs. Some New World peoples such as the Mapuche of Araucania resisted the adoption of Spanish technology, holding to their ancestral customs. Indigenous people have often been seen as static recipients of transatlantic encounters, but thousands of Native Americans crossed the ocean during the sixteenth century, some by choice.

=== Atlantic slave trade ===
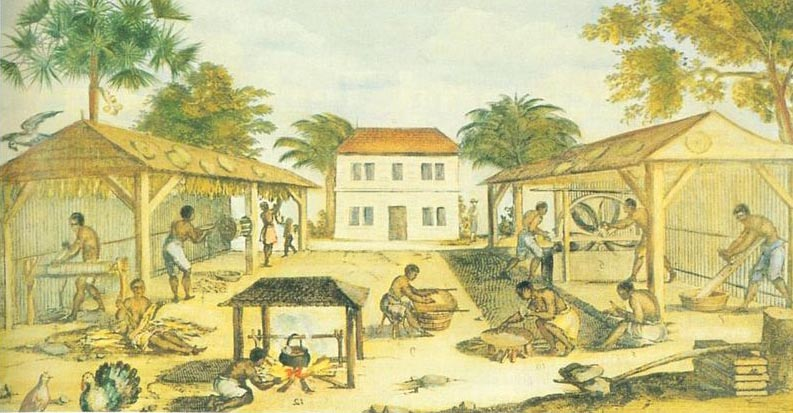
A depiction of slaves working at a plantation in Virginia, 1670

The Atlantic slave trade consisted of the involuntary immigration of 11.7 million Africans, primarily from West Africa, to the Americas between the 16th and 19th centuries, far outnumbering the about 3.4 million Europeans who migrated, most voluntarily, to the New World between 1492 and 1840. The prevalence of African slaves in the New World was related to the demographic decline of New World peoples and the need of European colonists for labor. Another reason for the demand for slaves was the cultivation of crops such as sugar cane suitable for the climatic conditions of the new lands. The Africans were less likely to die, too, from those diseases that had been brought to the New World. Enslaved Africans helped shape an emerging African-American culture in the New World. They participated in both skilled and unskilled labor. For example, slaves were involved in handicraft production. They could also work as ordinary workers, and as managers of small enterprises in the commercial or industrial sphere. Their descendants gradually developed an ethnicity that drew from the numerous African tribes as well as European nationalities. The descendants of African slaves make up a majority of the population in some Caribbean countries, notably Haiti and Jamaica, and a sizeable minority in most American countries.

== See also ==
- Arab Agricultural Revolution
- Early impact of Mesoamerican goods in Iberian society
- Great American Interchange
- List of food plants native to the Americas
- Pre-Columbian trans-oceanic contact theories
- Transformation of culture

== Sources ==
- Crosby, Alfred W. (1972). The Columbian Exchange: Biological and Cultural Consequences of 1492. Greenwood Press. ISBN 978-0-8371-5821-1.

- ————— (2003). The Columbian Exchange: Biological and Cultural Consequences of 1492. Praeger.

- ————— (December 2001). "The Columbian Exchange: Plants, Animals, and Disease between the Old and New Worlds". National Humanities Center.
- ————— (2004) [1986]. Ecological Imperialism: The Biological Expansion of Europe, 900-1900. Cambridge; New York: Cambridge University Press. ISBN 978-0-521-83732-3.
- Mann, Charles C. (2011). 1493: Uncovering the New World Columbus Created. New York: Alfred A. Knopf. ISBN 9780307265722.
- Nunn, Nathan; Qian, Nancy (2010). "The Columbian Exchange: A History of Disease, Food, and Ideas" (PDF). Journal of Economic Perspectives. 24 (2): 163–188. doi:10.1257/jep.24.2.163. JSTOR 25703506. Archived from the original (PDF) on August 11, 2017.
