= Ecological imperialism =

Concept of foreign species aiding colonization by disrupting local ecology

Ecological imperialism is an explanatory concept, introduced by Alfred Crosby, that points out the contribution of European biological species such as animals, plants and pathogens in the success of European colonists. Crosby wrote Ecological Imperialism: The Biological Expansion of Europe, 900-1900 in 1986. He used the term "Neo-Europes" to describe the places colonized and conquered by Europeans.

== Examples for Crosby's concept ==
In 1607, a group of colonists led by Captain John Smith arrived in North America and established the Jamestown colony in Virginia. Though at first it seemed the colonists would not survive the harsh conditions of the New World, ultimately it was the natives who could not survive the diseases of the Old World. "The colonizers brought along plants and animals new to the Americas, some by design and others by accident. Determined to farm in a European manner, the colonists introduced their domesticated livestock—honeybees, pigs, horses, mules, sheep, and cattle—and their domesticated plants, including wheat, barley, rye, oats, grasses, and grapevines. But the colonists also inadvertently carried pathogens, weeds, and rats." The introduction of these foreign species upset the balance of native species and severely hurt the way of life of the native population.

The first major smallpox outbreak among natives was between 1616 and 1619 in Massachusetts. Native Americans had never seen a disease like this, and it wiped out entire settlements in nations such as the Abenaki, the Pawtucket, and the Wampanoag. "By wiping out the Indians, smallpox helped the colonists help themselves to land and resources formerly controlled by unfriendly native people. The Europeans could and did colonize virtually unchallenged in some areas." In 1633 there was another devastating epidemic. William Bradford, governor of the Plymouth Colony, observed that: "They lye on their hard matts, ye pox breaking and muttering, and running one into another, their skin cleaving (by reason thereof) to the matts they lye on; when they turn them, a whole side with flea off at once...and they will be all of a gore blood, most fearful to behold. Then being very sore, what with cold and other distempers, they dye like rotten sheep."

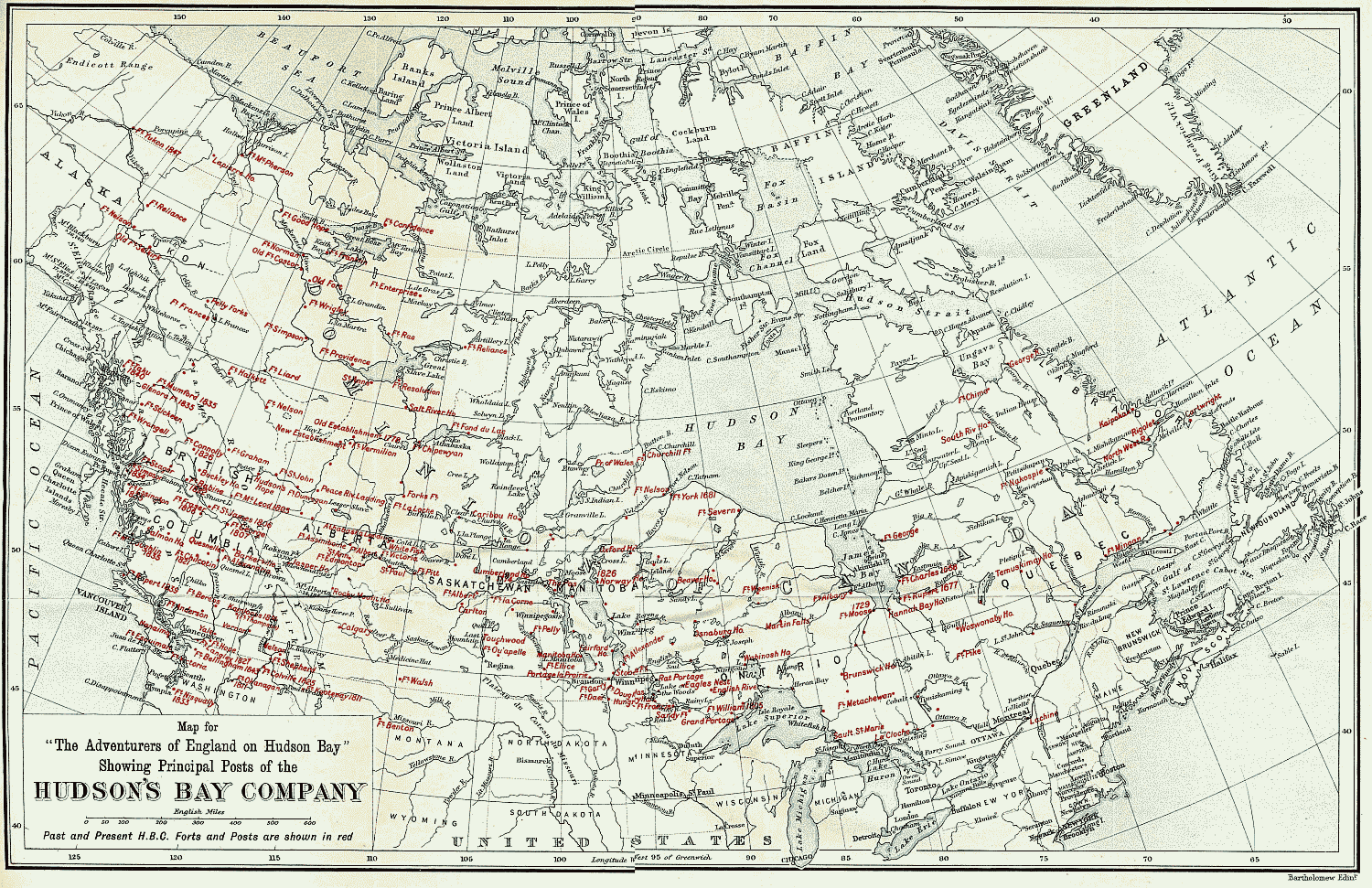
The Principal posts of the Hudson Bay Company by 1914

During this time of colonialism, Europe had seen a great increase in the demand for luxury fur, mainly by Western Europeans. Serbia at the time was the main source of luxury fur, but was unable to supply enough, thus leading to an increase in the value of fur, which in turn expanded the fur trade in North America.

The fur trade also upset the ecological balance of North America. "Restraint wasn't a hallmark of the fur trade. In 1822, in the north western regions of the country alone, the Hudson's Bay Company stockpiled 1,500 fox skins, a paltry number compared with the 106,000 beaver skins, but too many none the less. The fur traders had miscalculated. As predators, they had failed to adapt to their prey, and their prey, in turn, retaliated with denial. Of course, the red fox didn't render himself extinct. His numbers merely shrank." The fur trade not only miscalculated the predator-prey ratio, it allowed for the increase spread of smallpox in the Northern regions of the Americas, thus creating a geographic commercial route for smallpox to travel from urban populated cities to the rural, open, woodland northern country.

== See also ==
- Chagos Marine Protected Area – area around the Chagos islands declared a "marine protected area" to justify the exile of Chagossians, while permitting the military base to pollute the area
- Colonisation (biology)
- Genocide of indigenous peoples
- Locally unwanted land use
- Richard Grove, author of Green Imperialism (1995)
