= Early impact of Mesoamerican goods in Iberian society =

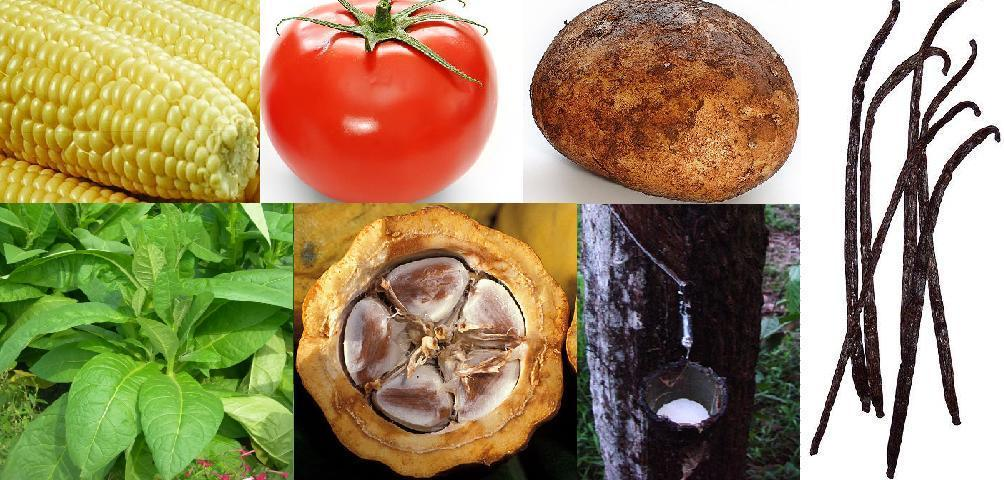
New World native plants. Clockwise, from top left: 1. Maize 2. Tomato 3. Potato: 4. Vanilla 5. Rubber tree 6. Cacao 7. Tobacco

The early impact of Mesoamerican goods on Iberian society had a profound effect on European societies, particularly in Spain and Portugal. The introduction of American crops was instrumental in alleviating the famine and hunger common in the Iberian Peninsula during the 16th century. Maize, potatoes, turkey, squash, beans, and tomatoes were incorporated into existing Spanish and Portuguese cuisines. Equally significant was the impact of cash crops grown in the New World, such as coffee and sugar cane. The introduction of new goods like tobacco also altered Iberian society. The impacts of these New World goods and foods can be examined based on their influence over the state, economy, religious institutions, and culture of the time. The power and influence of the state grew as other European nations became dependent on Spain for these new goods in the early 16th century. The economies of both Portugal and Spain saw significant growth as a result of trading these American goods.

== Luxury goods and foods ==
Several goods and foods brought to the Old World appealed to the tastes of the upper classes. The difficulty and cost of acquiring these items initially contributed to their high price and elite status.

=== Cocoa ===
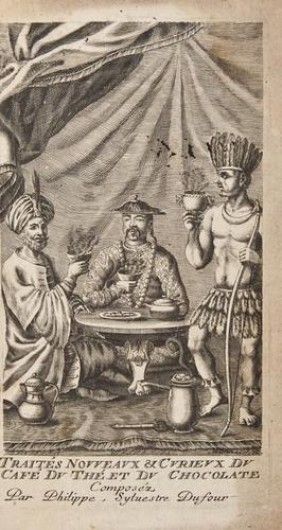
"Traités nouveaux & curieux du café du thé et du chocolate", by Philippe Sylvestre Dufour, 1685.

Chocolate was one of the most influential New World goods in Spanish society. By the 1590s, it had a significant presence in the Iberian Peninsula. The growing consumption of chocolate in Spain led to the transmission of tastes associated with it, such as vanilla, pepper, and a preference for the color red and a foamy froth. The taste for chocolate spread as colonists and conquistadors encountered native practices. Spaniards in the Americas initially had mixed reactions to the chocolate beverage, but its popularity quickly spread to the Iberian Peninsula. The method of its consumption and social perception changed as it reached Europe. Cacao was essential for chocolate, and cocoa beans also served as a currency in Mesoamerica, indicating their value. For natives, chocolate held religious meaning, while for the Spanish, it was often seen as a stimulating drink. By the 1620s, thousands of pounds of cacao were imported to Spain annually. The preparation of European chocolate evolved as the Spanish modified the recipe using available resources, for example, adding sugar as a sweetener instead of honey. It eventually became more accessible to different levels of Spanish society. Despite initial negative stigmas (such as the belief that chocolate drinking was a form of idolatry), it became one of the most desired and influential goods from the New World.

=== Sugar ===
While originating in the Indian subcontinent, the cultivation of sugar in the New World significantly impacted Spanish society. New World sugar cultivation bolstered the economies of Spain and Portugal while also increasing the demand for slave labor, which had severe consequences for African, American, and European societies. Sugar began as a mark of social status among the upper classes but gradually spread to the lower classes. This desire for sugar was driven by social factors beyond simple biological pleasure. Sociologist Pierre Bourdieu argues that subjective pleasures, such as a taste for sugar, reflect social constructs and are often influenced by those in power. Bourdieu's argument suggests that the popularity of sugar in Iberian society was influenced by the perceived value placed on it by the ruling upper classes.

=== Coffee ===
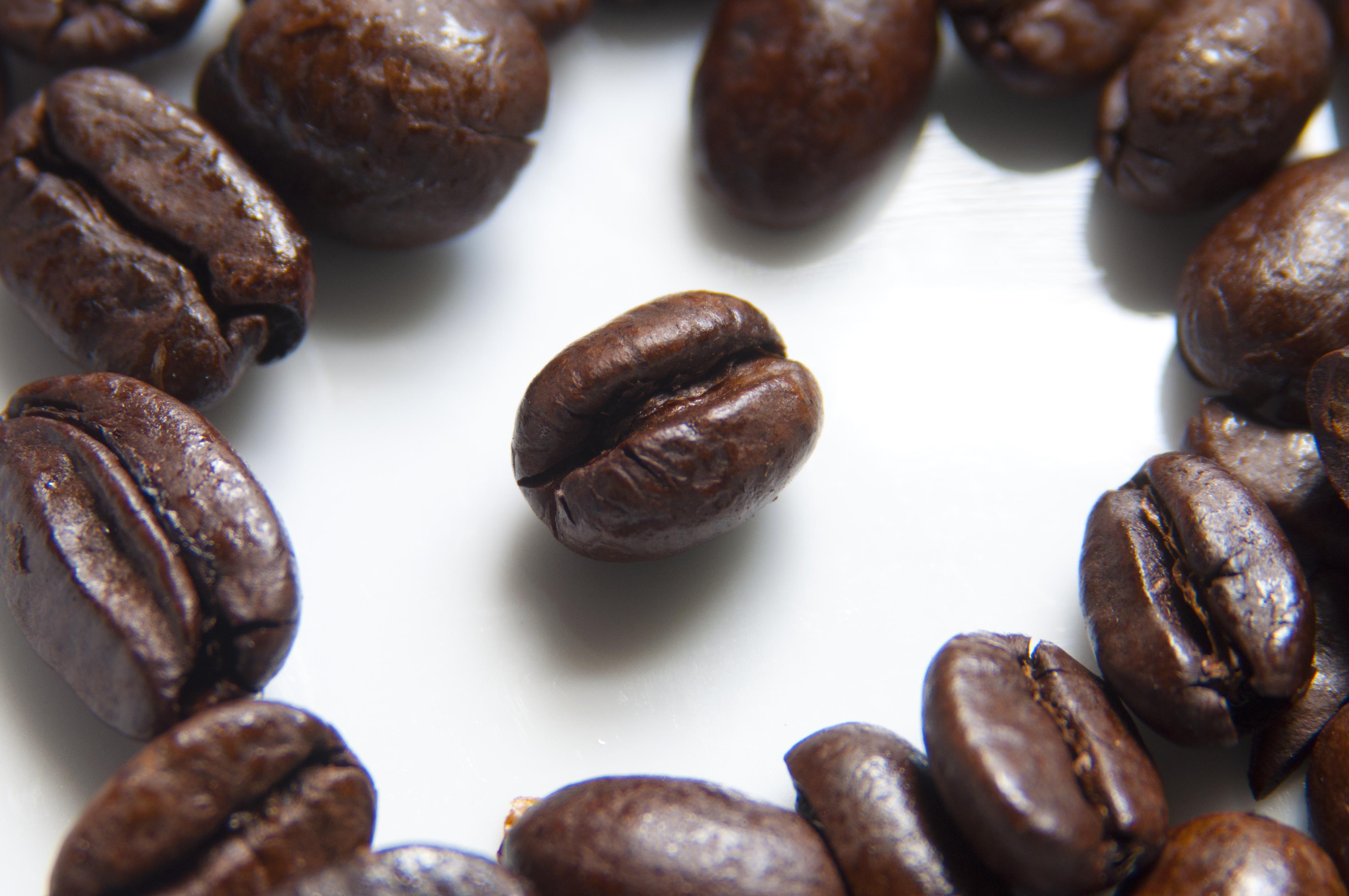
Close-up of roasted coffee beans

Although native to Ethiopia, the cultivation of coffee in the New World substantially increased its popularity among Europeans. The cultivation and spread of coffee into Europe began in the 15th century from the Arab world. The assimilation of chocolate into Spanish tastes paved the way for coffee to gain popularity as a new hot stimulant drink in Spain. Coffee imports even surpassed those of chocolate by the 18th century. The demand for coffee, like that for chocolate, eventually spread to include all social classes in Iberia. Coffee, along with chocolate and sugar, stimulated a growing taste for sweet goods from the New World.

=== Tobacco ===
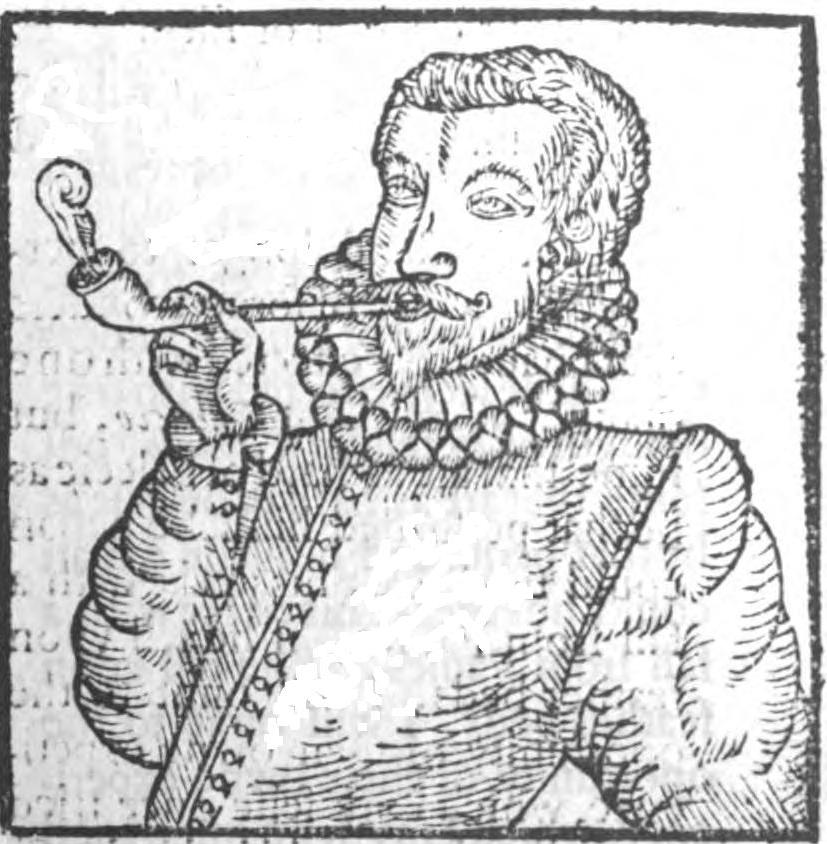
The earliest image of a man smoking, from Tabaco by Anthony Chute.

Known for its addictive qualities, tobacco saw increasingly prominent demand in New World trade. The plant was initially smoked by native tribes in the Americas for ceremonial purposes and was often believed to be a gift from the gods, used primarily by religious leaders. The Spanish altered this dynamic by trading tobacco as a commodity. The demand for tobacco stimulated the Spanish and Portuguese trade networks and increased Iberian influence in world trade. The tobacco trade significantly shaped the economies of the southeastern United States until cotton gained prominence in world trade.

=== Vanilla ===
Vanilla, a flavoring derived from orchids of the genus Vanilla, was brought to Spain in the 1520s by Cortez after his conquest of the Aztec Empire. The Aztecs had begun cultivating the plant after subjugating the Totonec peoples of present-day Mexico.

== Staples ==
Several foods from the New World quickly became staples in Europe. Examples include the dependence on the potato in Ireland and the tomato in Italy.

=== Maize ===
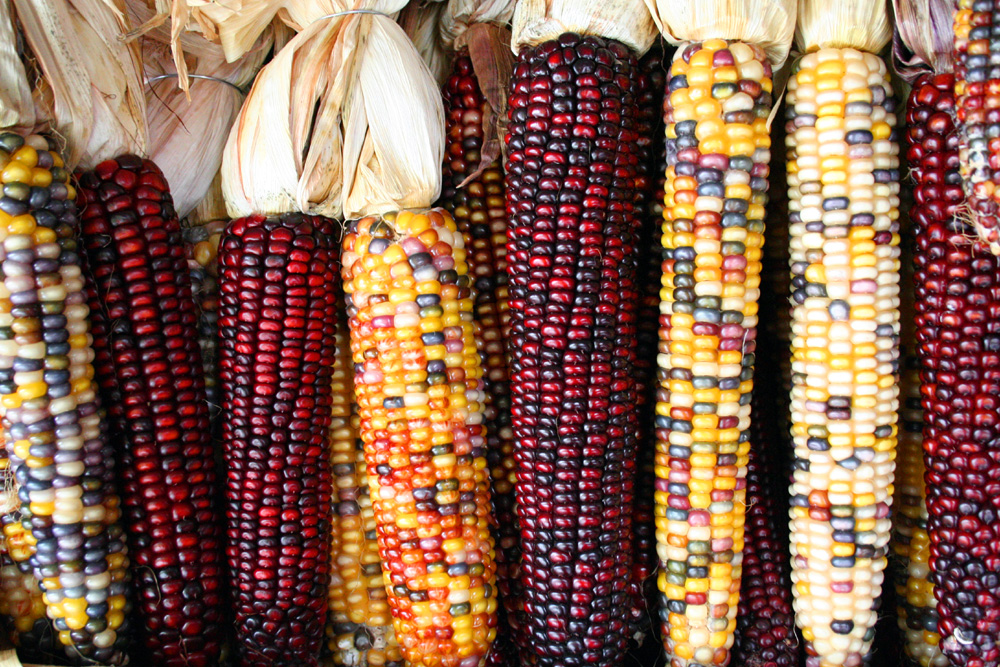
Variegated maize ears

Columbus encountered and noted the cultivation of maize on all his voyages. The Aztecs and Mayans of Central America had cultivated various forms of the crop long before its introduction to Europe. Traders brought maize back to Europe in the 16th century, where its ability to grow in diverse regions led to rapid popularity. It became a crucial crop in the Turkish Empire and the Balkans by the mid-16th century. Maize was essential for the growing Ottoman armies and was noted for its productive harvests. Its rapid spread to the Ottoman Empire by the mid-16th century suggests it had become a prevalent crop in Spain and Portugal by that time. However, the Europeans did not adopt nixtamalization, risking pellagra. In the mountains of the Basque Country, the substitution of millet with maize and the small fortunes made in the Americas encouraged the construction of baserri farms.

=== Squash ===
Native populations of the Americas had long relied on squash, along with corn and beans, as primary staples. The Spanish who brought this crop back to Europe found it similarly practical and adopted it as a staple. Squash was known in the Turkish Empire by 1539.

=== Beans ===
While beans were long known in Europe and Asia, common, lima bean, and sieva beans were among the new types introduced to Europe after Columbus's voyages. Natives had recognized the protein-rich benefits of beans, and the Spanish were quick to adopt the new varieties into their diets.

=== Tomatoes ===
Tomatoes had been popular in South America, where native peoples of Peru grew and traded them. Cortés's conquests in the 16th century resulted in the crop's introduction into Spain and subsequently Europe. The crop grew well in Mediterranean soils and quickly gained popularity. The first known cookbook with tomato recipes was published in Naples in 1692. Culinary historian Alan Davidson argues that the tomato and potato were initially treated with suspicion due to their resemblance to the poisonous belladonna plant.

=== Turkey ===
Spaniards encountered domesticated turkeys in Panama in 1502. The Spanish brought the turkey back to Spain, where it became a popular new source of meat.

=== Peppers ===
Columbus recorded at least two new types of peppers after his first voyage. Following this initial encounter, Spain gradually incorporated peppers into its diet and spread them throughout Europe. The diffusion of peppers in the Old World utilized pre-existing trade networks across Europe, Africa, Asia, and the Near East. The Portuguese and Ottomans were more influential in the widespread diffusion of Mesoamerican food complexes across Europe than the Spanish, who initially introduced the crops. By 1543, the first European illustrations of peppers were published in a German herbal.

=== Potato ===
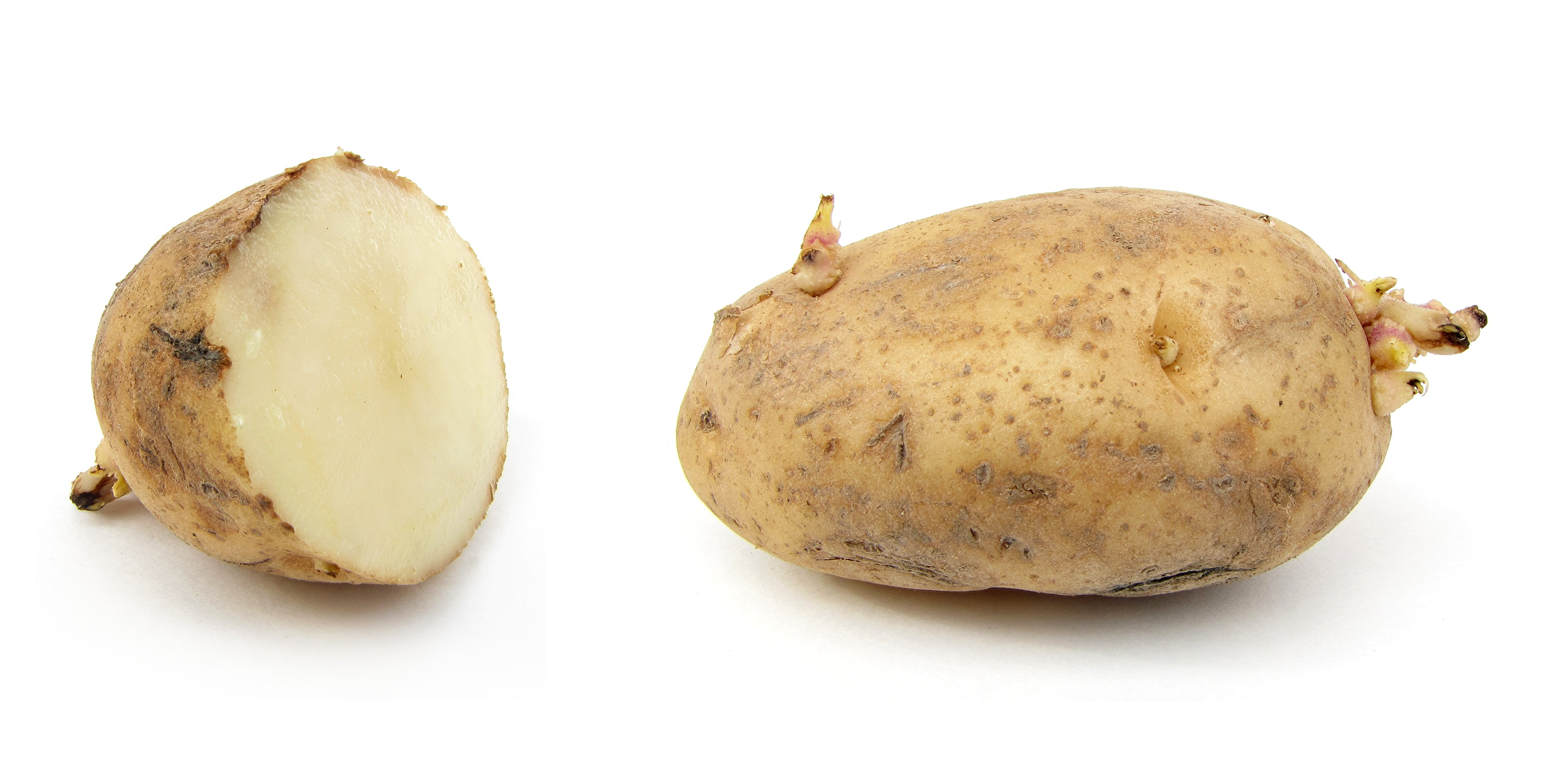
Russet potatoes with sprouts

The tuberous crop known as the potato originated in the southern region of Peru. The potato served as the principal staple crop for the Inca Empire and was met with similar popularity in the Spanish Empire. Spanish armies and workers adopted the crop as a staple due to the relative ease of its production. Peasants also adopted the crop as the 16th century progressed. The potato continued to spread rapidly throughout Europe, where by the 19th century, it had replaced the turnip and rutabaga as principal food staples.

== Other influential goods ==
The influence of goods and foods from the Americas extended into other aspects of Iberian life beyond luxury and staple roles.

=== Cotton ===
Cotton was originally cultivated by the inhabitants of the Indus Valley. While Europe had contact with the crop before the discovery of the New World, its use and popularity increased dramatically following the establishment of cotton plantations on newly acquired American lands. Columbus encountered woven cotton fabrics in Nicaragua and Honduras during his fourth voyage. While cotton's spread into Europe was gradual, it revolutionized fabric production in the Old World. This crop, along with many others in the Americas, led to an increasing demand for slave labor. Cotton cultivation reached its peak during the Industrial Revolution in Europe.

=== Rubber ===
Rubber was originally cultivated by the Olmec people of Mesoamerica, typically by draining sap from rubber trees. Rubber did not have an early noticeable impact on the Iberian people, partly because the Pará rubber tree initially grew only in the Amazon rainforest. It was not until the 19th century that the tree could be grown successfully outside Brazil.

=== Flow of knowledge ===
While not a tangible good, the flow of knowledge from the New World that accompanied the introduction of new foods profoundly influenced Iberian and European society. Knowledge on how to cultivate new foods was essential for the early spread of Mesoamerican goods into Iberian society. It is plausible that this influx of knowledge led to new professions in Iberian society and changed existing agricultural practices.

== Non-social consequences ==
The influx of new goods and foods into 16th-century Spain and Portugal had significant effects on aspects of Iberian history beyond just society.

=== Economic impact ===
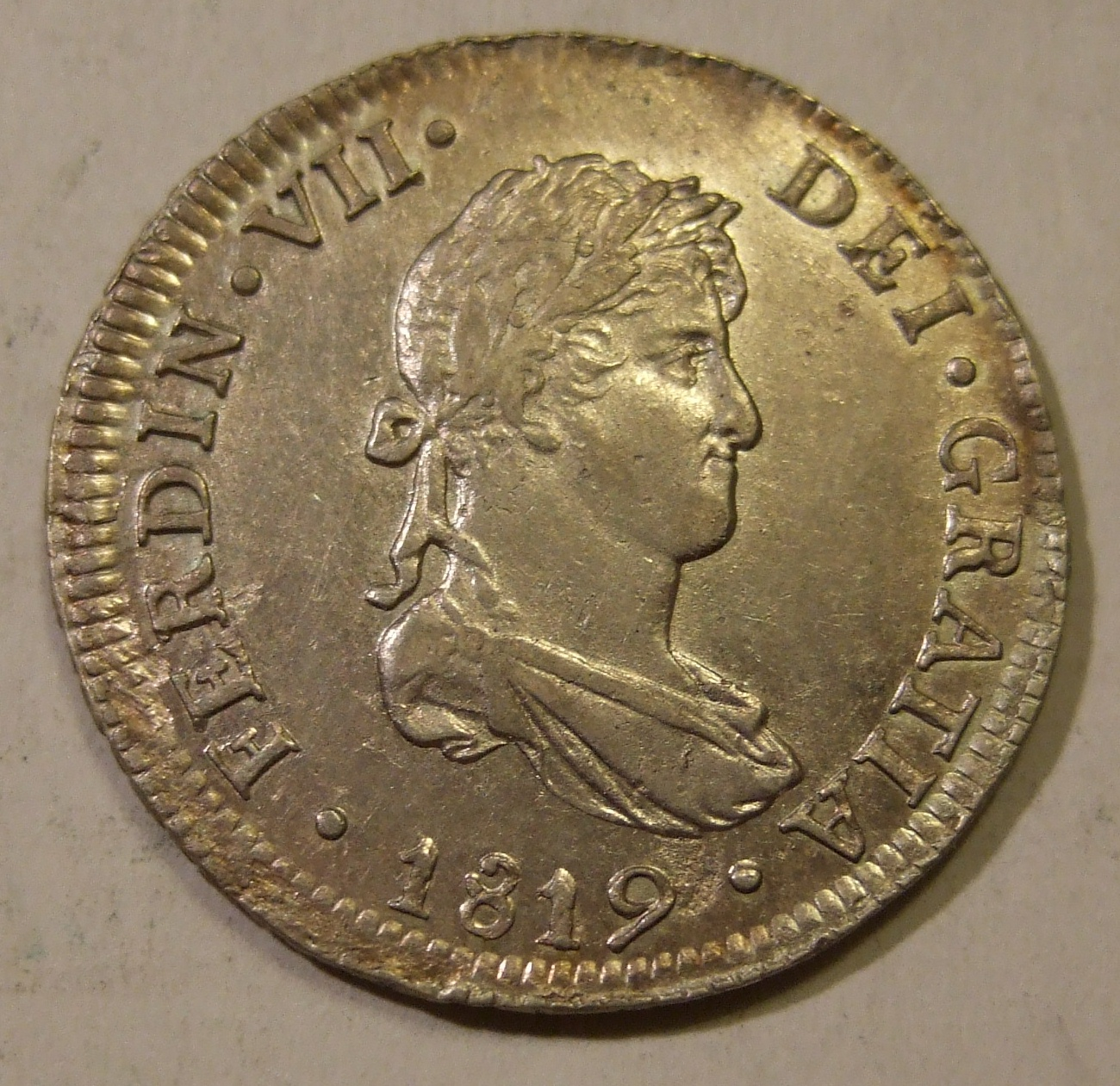
Spanish Currency

Spain and Portugal, as the first European nations to engage in New World trade, developed their economies through their control over the trade of American goods and foods in the early 16th century. Demand for New World stimulants like coffee and sugar may have incentivized people to work harder to afford these new habits. Additionally, the accessory items needed for many of these new goods (such as tobacco pipes and chocolate pots) led to new manufacturing professions, including those for clay pipes, snuffboxes, and porcelain ware.

The Spanish and Portuguese sought to extract revenue from their empires, utilizing forced labor. When the Pope prohibited the enslavement of natives, Spanish and Portuguese entrepreneurs turned to African slavery. The growing demand for New World goods, such as chocolate and sugar, contributed significantly to the growth of the transatlantic slave trade during the 16th and 17th centuries, with devastating effects on African societies. The Spanish crown's focus on extraction to minimize costs led to political corruption in their colonies and at home. Patch summarizes it as, “an entire commercial system based on government officials came into existence.”

Spain's extractive colonial approach faced challenges as other global powers became involved in the Americas. The Spanish colonial system and economic reliance on raw materials hindered Spain's commercial markets. Spain placed less emphasis on its North American colonies due to their lack of mineral wealth, instead using them as buffers to protect ports and richer colonies further south. Weber highlights this flaw, stating, “The economic malaise that affected Spain's North American colonies reflected the weakness of the Spanish economy itself, built traditionally on the exportation of raw materials and the importation of manufactured goods.” The Spanish economy at home, grappling with inflation, became dependent upon foreign imports and manufactured goods. The large influx of silver from the Americas created inflation across Europe, a period known in Spain as the Spanish price revolution. This inflation raised the cost of domestic manufactures, making them uncompetitive. Spain's colonial policy of extraction contributed to its inability to supply its colonies and domestic market. Weber further notes the Spanish inability to capitalize on commercial markets, stating, “The cost of transportation plus profits for numerous middlemen and additional internal custom duties (alcabalas) along the way drove the price of some items to many time their Verecruz or Mexico City value by the time they reached the frontier.” The crown's failure to establish efficient trading routes and imposition of high tariffs discouraged legitimate merchants and traders. Spain's colonies in the Americas suffered as merchants turned to alternative forms of trade. Weber summarizes this by stating, “For suppliers and consumers alike, such artificially high prices made smuggling so attractive that perhaps two-thirds of all commerce throughout the Spanish empire consisted of illegal trade, much of it with foreigner… it increased as English and French merchants grew more numerous and proximate.”

=== Religious impact ===
The abundance of meat in Spanish America led to the use of animal fats in cooking, rather than olive oil. Pope Pius III, acknowledging the meat-based diet, granted colonists a thirty-year exemption from fasting requirements. This reinforced reliance on meat in the Spanish American diet and persisted even after the exemption period ended.

=== State impact ===
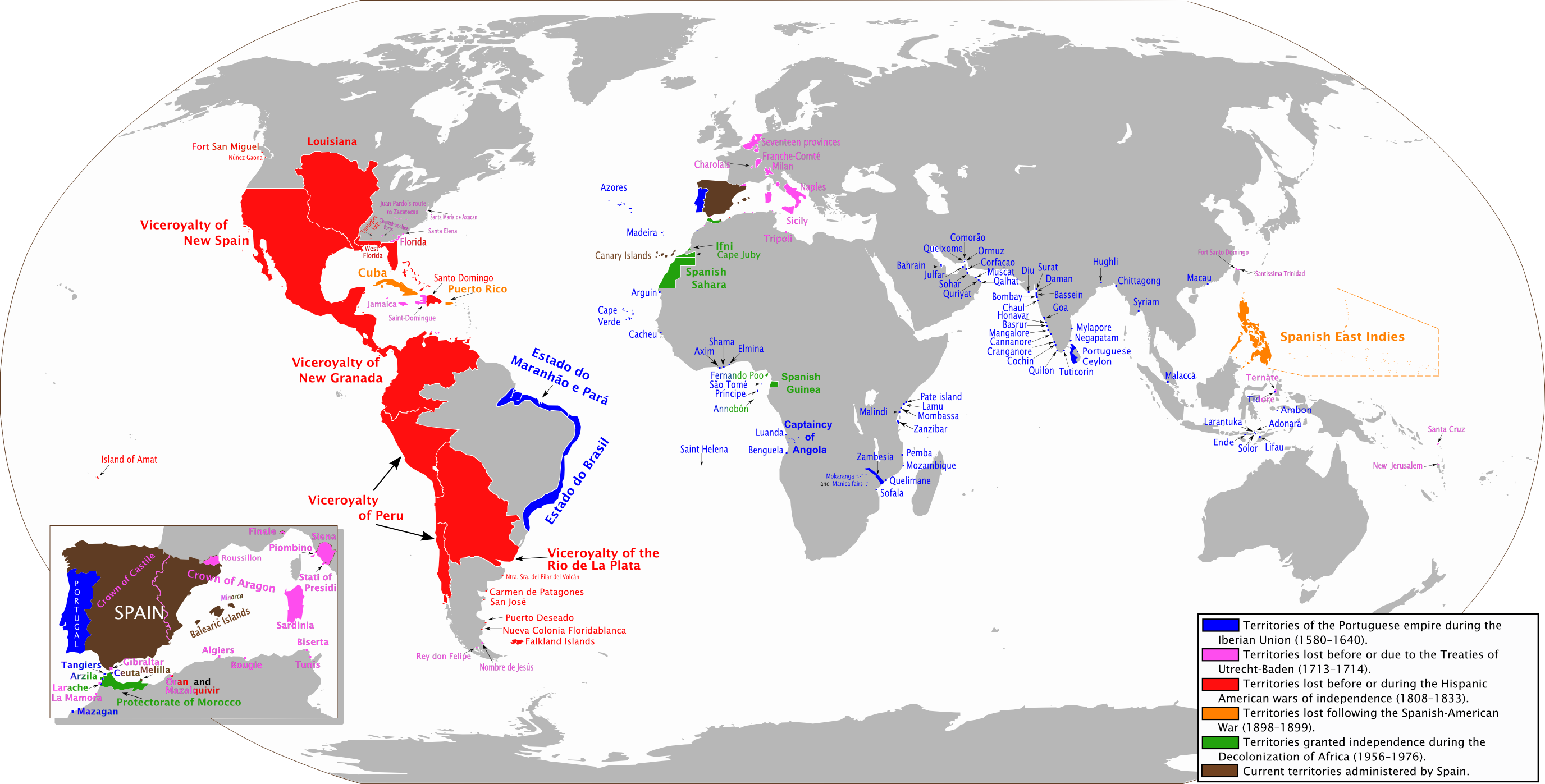
An anachronous map showing areas pertaining to the Spanish Empire at various times over a period exceeding 400 years.

Despite the formal trade exclusion between Spain and Portugal in the early 16th century, Portuguese merchants acquired goods from the Spanish, leading to Portuguese dominance in the pepper trade within Europe. Portuguese trade with the New World flourished despite the Treaty of Tordesillas due to illicit trade and Spanish permission for Portuguese merchants to bring African slaves and other trade goods into the colonies. This disregard for official sanctions was often a necessity for those whose livelihoods depended on such trade. The underground trade between Spain and Portugal was enhanced by the African slave trade and became well-established as mutually beneficial crops like maize, grains, squash, and beans were exchanged. Venice, Genoa, and Florence, among other Old World nations, depended on Iberians for New World goods in the early 16th century. The incorporation of American crops helped Europe recover from its 16th-century cycles of hunger and starvation. Dependence on Spain and Portugal for New World goods perpetuated their colonization efforts globally, contributing to their status as leading world powers in the 16th and 17th centuries.

The enormous wealth extracted from the Americas and channeled into Spanish society contributed to corruption both at home and in the colonies. The accumulation of vast resources at the top of the system had ripple effects. Corruption was widespread, starting with the crown in Spain and extending throughout the colonies. Royals, elites, government officials, and merchants grew significantly wealthy rapidly. Patch points out that, “State played a leading role in capital accumulation under colonialism. “Corruption” was therefore an integral and necessary part of the state system.” Government officials facilitated capital mobilization and investment, diverted surplus away from producers, and shared profits with merchant partners. Merchant status increased with corruption, playing a key role in the spread of commodities and ideas. One recorded instance of the crown needing revenue, such as during wartime, led to the Sale of Magistracies, which began in the 1670s when the government of the last Habsburg king, Charles II, introduced the measure in a desperate attempt to tap all possible sources of revenue.

=== Cultural impact ===
By the late 1630s, depictions of chocolate accouterments became increasingly common in still life paintings.

== See also ==
- Columbian exchange – Transfers between the Old and New Worlds
