= Alfred W. Crosby =

20th Century American historian, author, and academic

- Born: 15 January 1931; Boston, Massachusetts, U.S.
- Died: 14 March 2018 (aged 87); Nantucket, Massachusetts, U.S.
- Education: Harvard University (A.B.); Boston University (Ph.D.)
- Known for: The Columbian Exchange (1972), Ecological Imperialism (1986)
- Scientific career
- Fields: History
- Workplaces: Washington State University; University of Texas, Austin; University of Helsinki

Alfred Worcester Crosby Jr. (January 15, 1931 – March 14, 2018) was a professor of history, geography, and American studies at the University of Texas at Austin, and University of Helsinki. He was the author of books including The Columbian Exchange (1972) and Ecological Imperialism (1986). In these works, he provided biological and geographical explanations for the question why Europeans were able to succeed with relative ease in what he referred to as the "Neo-Europes" of Australasia, North America, and southern South America. America's Forgotten Pandemic (1976) is the first major critical history of the Spanish flu.

== Early life ==
Alfred Worcester Crosby Jr. was born to Ruth (née Coleman) and Alfred Worcester Crosby Sr. in Boston, Massachusetts, on January 15, 1931, grew up in Wellesley, Massachusetts, and graduated from Wellesley High School.

== Career ==
In 1952, Crosby graduated from Harvard College, with a degree in history with a thesis on cannabis trade and Russia–U.S. relations, then entered the U.S. Army in 1952, during the Korean War, later spending about twenty months stationed in the Panama Canal Zone, in Latin America. After being discharged from the U.S. Army in 1955, he obtained a master's degree in teaching from Harvard in 1956, and a doctorate in history from Boston University in 1961.

Crosby was an inter-disciplinary researcher who combined the fields of history, geography, biology and medicine. Recognizing the majority of modern-day wealth is located in Europe and the "Neo-Europes", Crosby set out to investigate what historical causes are behind the disparity, investigating the biological factors that contributed to the success of Europeans in their quest to conquer the world. One of the important themes of his work was how epidemics affected the history of mankind. As early as the 1970s, he was able to understand the impact of the Spanish flu on world history.

According to Hal Rothman, a professor of history at the University of Nevada, Las Vegas, Crosby "added biology to the process of human exploration, coming up with explanations for events as diverse as Cortés' conquest of the Aztec Empire and the fall of the Inca empire that made vital use of the physical essence of humanity."

In 1972 he created the term Columbian exchange in his book of the same name. The term has become popular among historians and journalists. Other terms coined included 'Neo-Europes' and 'virgin soil epidemic'.

Crosby was also interested in the history of science and technology. He wrote several books on this subject, dealing with the history of quantification, of projectile technology, and the history of the use of energy. He said that the study of history also made him a researcher of the future. He was very much interested in how humankind could make the future a better one.

He taught at Washington State University, where he was a co-founder of the school's first black studies department, then Yale University, the Alexander Turnbull Library in New Zealand, and twice at the University of Helsinki as a Fulbright Bicentennial Professor, most recently in 1997–98. He was appointed an academician by Finnish president Martti Ahtisaari. He retired from the chair of professor emeritus of History, Geography, and American Studies of the University of Texas at Austin, after teaching for 22 years, in 1999.

== Personal life ==
Crosby was interviewed by historian John Frederick Schwaller, who discussed Crosby's life and work.

Crosby's hobbies included birdwatching and jazz, on which topic he could lecture with great expertise. He traveled with thirty-six students to Delano, California to assist in building a health center for the United Farm Workers.

He was married to linguist Frances Karttunen. He was previously married, to Anna Bienemann and Barbara Stevens. His son Kevin, and his daughter, Carolyn, survived him. He died on Nantucket Island of complications of Parkinson's disease.

== Books ==
- America, Russia, Hemp, and Napoleon: American Trade with Russia and the Baltic, 1793–1812. Ohio State University Press 1965.
- The Columbian Exchange: Biological and Cultural Consequences of 1492. Greenwood Press 1972, Praeger Publishers 2003. Available in Spanish, Italian, and Korean translations.
- Epidemic and Peace, 1918. Greenwood Press 1976. Republished as America's Forgotten Pandemic.
  - America's Forgotten Pandemic: The Influenza of 1918. Cambridge University Press 1989, 2003. Originally published as Epidemic and Peace, 1918. Available in Japanese translation.
- Ecological Imperialism: The Biological Expansion of Europe, 900–1900. Cambridge University Press 1986, 1993, 2004. Available in German, Swedish, Spanish, Portuguese, Italian, Polish, Greek, Turkish, Chinese, Japanese, and Korean translations.
- Germs, Seeds, and Animals: Studies in Ecological History. M. E. Sharpe 1994.
- The Measure of Reality: Quantification and Western Society, 1250–1600. Cambridge University Press 1997. Available in Spanish, Portuguese, French, Italian, Swedish, Japanese, Slovennian and Korean translations.
- Throwing Fire: Projectile Technology Through History. Cambridge University Press 2002. Also available in Turkish and Japanese language translations.
- Children of the Sun: A History of Humanity's Unappeasable Appetite for Energy. W.W. Norton 2006.

== See also ==
- Ramachandra Guha (historian influenced by Crosby; see This Fissured Land)
