= Resistance through culture =

Resistance through culture (also called cultural resistance, resistance through the aesthetic, or intellectual resistance) is a form of nonconformism. It is not open dissent, but a discrete stance.

A revolt "so well hidden that it seems nonexistent", it is a quest "to extend the boundaries of official tolerance, either by adopting a line considered by authorities to be ideologically suspect, or by highlighting certain contemporary social problems, or both." Criticized for being "utopian, and thus inadequate to the realities of that age", during the time of the Communist regimes in Europe, it was also a surviving formula, a modality for writers and artists to cheat Communist censorship without going the whole way into open political opposition.

== Romania ==
One of the most sharply criticized phrases in post-revolutionary Romania, considered to be not much more than "blowing in the wind" by Romanian-born German Nobel literature prize winner Herta Müller, and "not only resignation [...] but complicity with the terrorist communism" by Romanian exiled writer Paul Goma, so-called "resistance through culture" has often been linked to Constantin Noica's so-called "Păltiniș School".

In the fine arts, Corneliu Baba, among others, is sometimes considered to be an example of a painter who was nonconformist in this way.
