= The Columbian Exchange =

1972 book by Alfred W. Crosby

The Columbian Exchange: Biological and Cultural Consequences of 1492
- Author: Alfred W. Crosby
- Language: English
- Subject: Columbian exchange
- Genre: Environmental history
- Publisher: Greenwood Publishing Group
- Publication date: 1972
- Publication place: United States
- Pages: 268
- ISBN: 978-0837172286

The Columbian Exchange: Biological and Cultural Consequences of 1492 is a 1972 book by Alfred W. Crosby on the Columbian exchange, coining that term and helping to found the field of environmental history. The exchange was of cultivated plants, domestic animals, diseases, and human culture between the Old World and the New World, in the centuries immediately following Christopher Columbus's voyage to the Americas in 1492.

== Book ==
Crosby begins by examining the contrasts between the Old World and the New World in the 15th century. He then looks at the way the Conquistadores brought disease and death to the indigenous peoples they encountered. He considers which Old World plants and animals were brought to the New World. The book then re-evaluates the early history of syphilis, a sexually transmitted disease which broke out in Europe immediately after Columbus and his sailors returned to Europe. Crosby examines the effect of New World foods on the demography of the Old World, suggesting that these had a substantial effect on people's nutrition and population growth in the centuries following the exchange. He concludes by looking at the continuing effects of the exchange.

The book is illustrated with monochrome reproductions of historic depictions of the exchange, such as of "King Ferdinand looks out across the Atlantic as Columbus lands in the West Indies", and with maps such as of the distributions of blood group genes in the world's aboriginal populations.

The book was first published in 1972. A revised edition was brought out in 2003.

== Reception ==
=== First edition ===
G. S. Dunbar called Crosby's work a "lively little book", noting his invention of the term "biohistory", and the reluctance of historians to explore that field, which lay somewhat outside "their traditional literary education".

Wayne D. Rasmussen wrote that farmers are well aware of the pests and diseases that follow cultural and biological exchanges. He commented that the book's key theme is not the list of diseases and foods that were exchanged, but the "assessments of the effects these exchanges had upon the ecological balance in each hemisphere." Recommending the book, he called it a "brief, but well-annotated argument", describing it as controversial but outside the "usual historical boundaries".

=== 30th anniversary edition ===
Frederick Liers wrote in 2005 that Crosby had difficulty getting the book published, and that when he did, conventional historians paid it little attention. That did not stop its message, of environmental history, from becoming widely accepted within the following three decades. In the foreword to the 2003 edition of the book, J. R. McNeill says that in 1972 "Crosby's ideas met with indifference from most historians, neglect from many publishers, and hostility from at least some reviewers, (but) they now figure prominently in conventional presentations of modern history." Today, the book is a founding text of the field of environmental history.

== See also ==
- 1491: New Revelations of the Americas Before Columbus (2005) by Charles C. Mann
- 1493: Uncovering the New World Columbus Created (2012) by Charles C. Mann
- The Sixth Extinction: An Unnatural History (2014) by Elizabeth Kolbert (ch. 10, "The New Pangea")
