= Hal Rothman =

American historian

Hal K. Rothman (1958–2007) was a historian, professor, radio show host, editor, public intellectual, and prolific author. Noted environmental history scholar Char Miller called him "a dynamic teacher, riveting speaker, compelling scholar, and sharp-tongued pundit." The writer Will Sarvis called Rothman "one of the best editors" he had ever worked with. University of Colorado historian Patricia Nelson Limerick (author of the famous book, Legacy of Conquest) described Rothman as a key contributor in the late 20th century renaissance of American West history. Limerick confirmed Rothman's almost unworldly level of energy, "Especially [in] the rate of publications -- thoughtful, and really worthwhile books." Rothman made numerous national media appearances in the New York Times, Wall Street Journal, Chicago Tribune, and on CNN, ABC, CBS, NBC, and other places. He was inducted into the Nevada Writers Hall of Fame in 2004.

Rothman died of Lou Gehrig's disease on Feb. 25, 2007.

== Selected publications ==
- America's National Monuments: The Politics of Preservation. Champaign, IL: University of Illinois Press, 1989. Lawrence, KS: University Press of Kansas, 1994.
- Beyond Neon: How Las Vegas Shed its Stigma and became the First City of the Twenty-First Century. NY: Routledge, 2002.
- Blazing Heritage: a History of Wildland Fire in the National Parks. NY: Oxford University Press, 2007.
- Devil's Bargains: Tourism in the Twentieth-Century American West. Lawrence, KS: University Press of Kansas, 1998.
- "I'll Never Fight Fire with My Bare Hands Again": Recollections of the First Forest Rangers of the Inland Northwest. Lawrence, KS: University Press of Kansas, 1994.
- LBJ's Texas White House: "Our Heart's Home." College Station: Texas A & M University Press, 2001. ISBN 978-1-58544-141-9
- Neon Metropolis: How Las Vegas Started the Twenty-First Century. NY: Routledge, 2002.
- On Rims & Ridges: the Los Alamos Area since 1880. Lincoln: University of Nebraska Press, 1992. ISBN 0-8032-8966-9
- Preserving Different Pasts: the American National Monuments. Urbana : University of Illinois Press, 1989.
- Reopening the American West. Tucson: University of Arizona Press, 1998.
- Saving the Planet: the American Response to the Environment in the Twentieth Century. Chicago: Ivan R. Dee, 2000.
- The Making of Modern Nevada. Reno: University of Nevada Press, 2010.
- The New Urban Park: Golden Gate National Recreation Area and Civic Environmentalism. Lawrence, KS: University Press of Kansas, 2004.
- with Daniel J. Holder. Promise Beheld and the Limits of Place: a Historic Resource Study of Carlsbad Caverns and Guadalupe Mountains National Parks and the Surrounding Areas. Washington, DC : U.S. Dept. of the Interior, National Park Service, 1998.
- with Gerald D. Nash and Richard W. Etulain. The Greening of a Nation?: Environmentalism in the United States since 1945. Fort Worth, TX: Harcourt Brace College Publishers, 1998.
- with Lincoln Bramwell. Playing the Odds : Las Vegas and the Modern West. Albuquerque : University of New Mexico Press, 2007.
- with Mike Davis, The Grit beneath the Glitter: Tales from the Real Las Vegas. Berkeley: University of California Press, 2002. ISBN 978-0-520-22538-1
- with William P. Clements. The Culture of Tourism, the Tourism of Culture: Selling the Past to the Present in the American Southwest. Albuquerque: University of New Mexico Press, 2003.
