= Virgin-soil epidemic =

Worse effects of disease to populations with no prior exposure

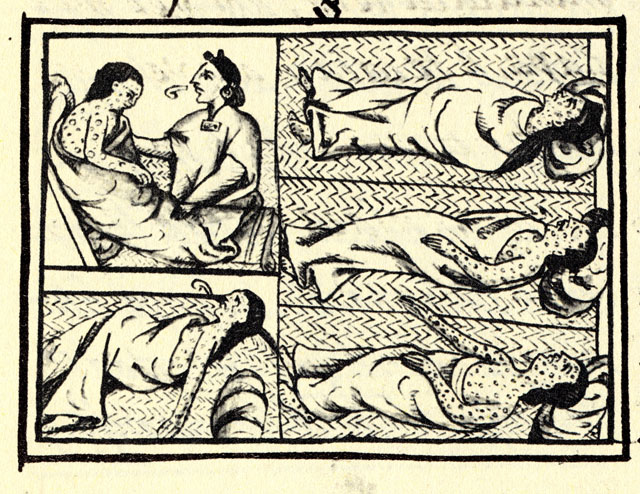
A 16th-century illustration of Nahuas infected with smallpox

In epidemiology, a virgin-soil epidemic is an epidemic in which populations that previously were in isolation from a pathogen are immunologically unprepared upon contact with the novel pathogen. Virgin-soil epidemics have occurred with European settlement, particularly when European explorers and colonists took diseases to lands they settled in the Americas, Australia, and the Pacific Islands.

When a population has been isolated from a particular pathogen without any contact, individuals in that population have not built up any immunity to that pathogen. The epidemiologist Francis Black has suggested that some isolated populations may not have mixed enough to become as genetically heterogeneous as their colonizers, which would also have affected their natural immunity, due to the potential benefits to immune system function from genetic diversity. That can also happen when such a considerable amount of time has passed between disease outbreaks that no one in a particular community has ever experienced the disease to gain immunity. Consequently, when a previously unknown disease is introduced to such a population, morbidity and mortality rates increase. That increase has often been considerably devastating.

Diseases introduced to the Americas by Europeans and Africans include smallpox, yellow fever, measles and malaria as well as new strains of typhus and influenza, among others.

Virgin-soil epidemics also occurred in other regions. For example, the Roman Empire spread smallpox to new populations in Europe and the Middle East in the 2nd century AD, and the Mongol Empire brought the bubonic plague to Europe and the Middle East in the 14th century.

== History of the term ==
The term "virgin soil epidemic" was coined by Alfred Crosby as an epidemic "in which the populations at risk have had no previous contact with the diseases that strike them and are therefore immunologically almost defenseless." His concept is related to that developed by William McNeill, who connected the development of agriculture and more sedentary life with the emergence of new diseases as microbes moved from domestic animals to humans.

In one early use of the term, in 1973, Peter Moodie remarked that measles and chickenpox, which are usually childhood diseases, may in ‘virgin soil’ epidemics “affect all age-groups”, and may also produce atypically dangerous sequelae such as pneumonia.

The concept would later be adopted wholesale by Jared Diamond as a central theme in his popular book Guns, Germs and Steel as an explanation for successful European expansion.

== Instances in the early modern period ==
=== Native American epidemics ===
Due to limited interaction between communities and more limited instances of zoonoses, the spread of infectious diseases was generally hampered in indigenous communities. This contrasted with Eurasia, where a large number of domesticated animals in close contact with large human populations would lead to more frequent zoonotic diseases, which would then in turn spread between human populations more easily due to trade and warfare. Native Americans were not exposed to this latent pool of circulating Eurasian diseases until the European colonization of the Americas, which then led to frequent virgin-soil epidemics among Native Americans.

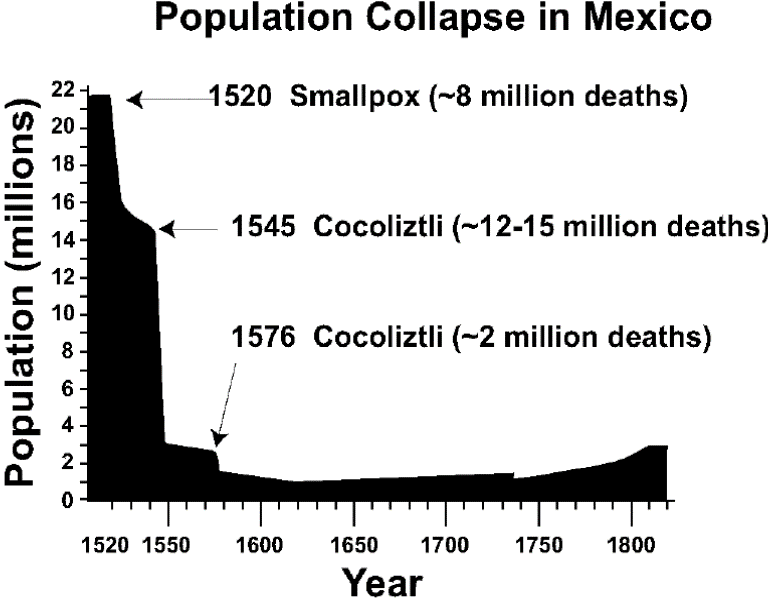
Estimates of the population collapse of Mexico in the 16th century. The first wave of deaths is attributed to smallpox, and the following waves are attributed to an unknown hemorrhagic fever agent from the Cocoliztli epidemics.

=== Cocoliztli epidemics ===
A series of epidemics of unknown origin caused major population collapses in Central America in the 16th century, possibly due to little immunological protection from previous exposures. While the pathogenic agents of these so-called Cocoliztli epidemics are unidentified, suspected pathogenic agents include endemic viral agents, Salmonella, or smallpox.

=== Other instances ===
With malaria spreading in the Caribbean islands after European–African contact, the immunological resistance of African slaves to malaria in contrast to the immunologically defenseless locals might have contributed to African slave trade.

== Instances in the late modern period ==
=== Australian Aboriginal epidemics ===
According to virgin-soil epidemic theory, the European colonization of Australia led to major epidemics among Aboriginal Australians, primarily due to smallpox, influenza, tuberculosis, measles, and potentially chickenpox. Major population declines were seen in 1789 and the early 1830s, widely attributed to the 1789 and 1830–31 outbreaks. The 1830–31 outbreak is debated to be either smallpox or chickenpox.

=== Pacific Islands epidemics ===
Population dynamics in Pacific Island populations, 1830–1930.

Colonization of the Pacific Islands in the 18th century led to high mortality rates of local populations from introduced pathogens. The deadliest pathogen here was dysentery, most likely bacillary dysentery.

The early 19th century saw an epidemic in Hawaii, referred to as okuu. This 1803–04 outbreak is believed to be dysenteric, although some officials in 1970 suspected the outbreak to be choleric in nature. Professor G. Dennis Shanks, Director of the Australian Defence Force Malaria and Infectious Disease Institute (ADF MIDI), opposes this hypothesis, as this outbreak would have predated the first confirmed outbreak of cholera in Hawaii in 1850. Other suspected dysentery epidemics spread throughout the Pacific Islands, including:

- 1792 and 1807 Tahiti outbreaks
- 1843 French Polynesia outbreak
- 1830, 1843, and 1864 Cook Islands and Rapa Iti outbreaks
- 1861, 1871, 1882, and 1901 Rotuma outbreaks
- 1880s and 1899 German New Guinea (modern-day Papua New Guinea and other independent island nations) outbreaks
- 1924 Futuna outbreak

Fiji was struck by a measles epidemic in early 1875, one that would end up eliminating a large amount of the population. Measles proved fatal to most, if not all, chieftains of Fiji, resulting in destabilization and a "leadership vacuum". The immunosuppression caused by measles often led to mortality from other diseases, such as dysentery or pneumonia.

=== Arctic epidemics ===
In the early 20th century, Alaska and other populations in the Arctic and sub-Arctic regions of North America were struck by virgin-soil epidemics. Dubbed "The Great Sickness," a 1900 epidemic of measles and influenza ravaged the Aleutian Islands and surrounding lands, killing thousands of Siberian and Native Alaskan Aleut and Eskimo peoples. Measles had been present in Alaska in the 18th century, but this strain of influenza was unfamiliar. Further epidemics were seen in the mid-20th century in Northern Quebec, but information about possible immunological weakness in those communities is limited.

=== Other instances ===
Novel and rapid-spreading pandemics such as the Spanish flu are occasionally referred to as virgin-soil pandemics.

== Instances in contemporary history ==
The potential for virgin-soil epidemics has lessened with technological advancement and travel accessibility, but isolated communities may still be vulnerable. Outbreaks today are more likely to be classified as travel-associated diseases rather than virgin-soil outbreaks.

=== Amazonian epidemics ===
The number of uncontacted populations in Amazonia shows a potential for virgin-soil epidemics. The region has suffered from epidemics since colonization, so the remaining uncontacted communities remain at risk. The creation of the Trans-Amazonian Highway in the 1970s led to numerous outbreaks of varying pathogens in several communities.

The Yanomami tribe of northern Brazil and southern Venezuela suffered multiple epidemics of diseases for which they lacked immunity. Referred to as "xarawa" by the Yanomami peoples, the outbreaks were believed to be due to the fumes of the newcomers. Epidemics struck with each initial contact with the Yanomami peoples in 1959, 1967, 1973–74, and 1987–90. Influenza, malaria, and measles were among the most prevalent.

== Debate ==
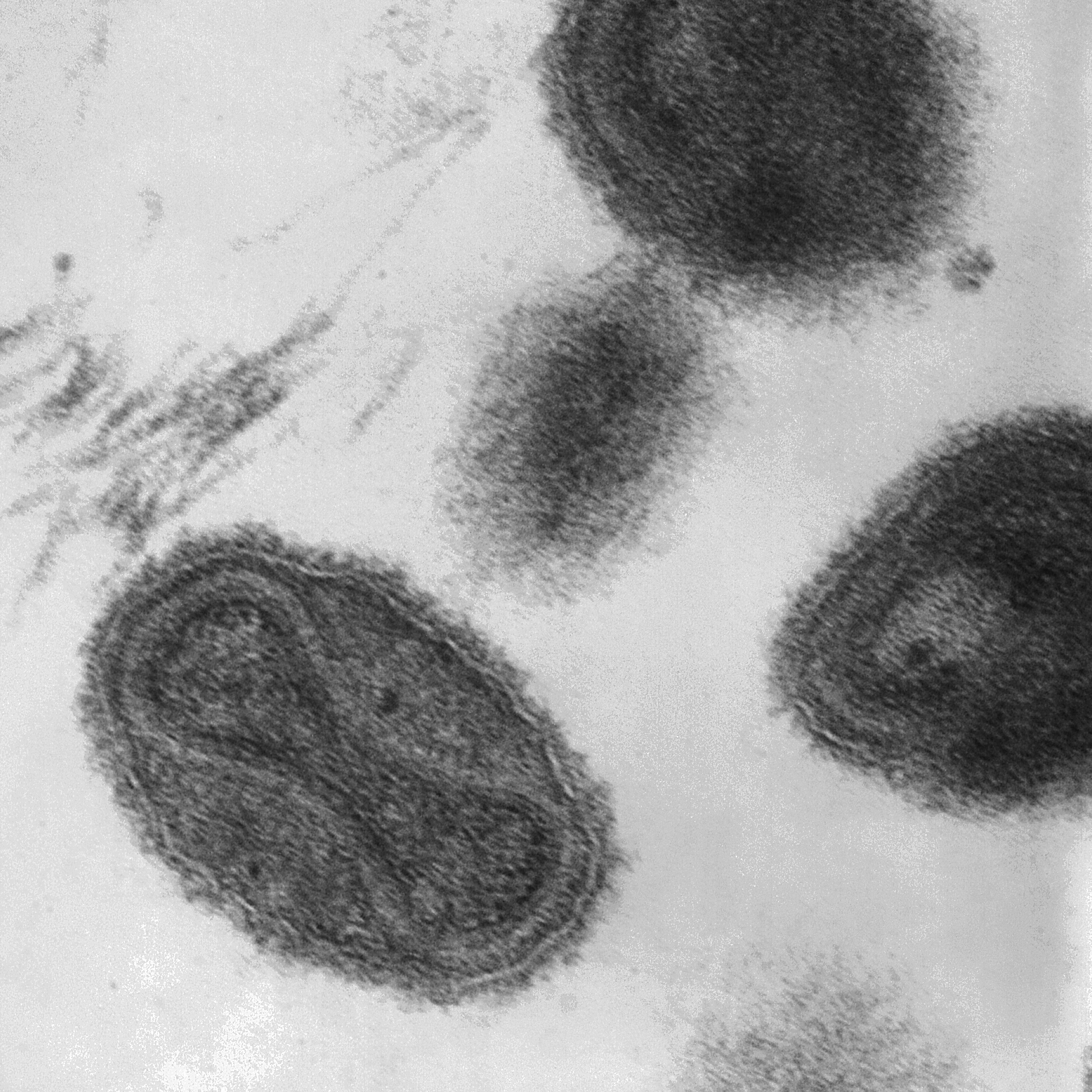
Transmission electron microscopy image of the smallpox virus, a historically common agent of virgin-soil epidemics

Research over the last few decades has questioned some aspects of the notion of virgin-soil epidemics. David S. Jones has argued that the term "virgin soil" is often used to describe a genetic predisposition to disease infection and that it obscures the more complex social, environmental, and biological factors that can enhance or reduce a population's susceptibility.

Paul Kelton has argued that the slave trade in indigenous people by Europeans exacerbated the spread and virulence of smallpox and that a virgin-soil model alone cannot account for the widespread disaster of the epidemic.

The debate, as regards smallpox (Variola major or Variola minor), is sometimes complicated by problems in distinguishing its effects from those of other diseases that could prove fatal to virgin-soil populations, most notably chickenpox. Thus, the famous virologist Frank Fenner, who played a major role in the worldwide elimination of smallpox, remarked in 1985, "Retrospective diagnosis of cases or outbreaks of disease in the distant past is always difficult and to some extent speculative."

Cristobal Silva has re-examined accounts by colonists of 17th-century New England epidemics and has interpreted and argued that they were products of particular historical circumstances, rather than universal or genetically inevitable processes.

Historian Gregory T. Cushman claims that virgin-soil epidemics were not the major cause of deaths due to disease among Pacific Island populations. Rather, diseases like tuberculosis and dysentery were able to take hold in Pacific Island populations that had weakened immune systems because of overworking and exploitation by European colonizers.

Historian Christopher R. Browning writes that "Disease, colonization, and irreversible demographic decline were intertwined and mutually reinforcing" in reference to virgin-soil epidemics during the European colonization of the Americas. He contrasts the rebound of the European population following the Black Death with the lack of such a rebound across most Native American populations, attributing this differing demographic trend to the fact that Europeans were not exploited, enslaved, and massacred in the aftermath of the Black Death like the Indigenous inhabitants of the New World were. "Disease as the chief killing agent," he writes, "does not remove settler colonialism from the rubric of genocide".

Following this work, historian Jeffrey Ostler has argued that, in relation to European colonization of the Americas, "virgin soil epidemics did not occur everywhere and ... Native populations did not inevitably crash as a result of contact. Most Indigenous communities were eventually afflicted by a variety of diseases, but in many cases this happened long after Europeans first arrived. When severe epidemics did hit, it was often less because Native bodies lacked immunity than because European colonialism disrupted Native communities and damaged their resources, making them more vulnerable to pathogens."

== See also ==
- Columbian Exchange
- Ecological imperialism
- History of syphilis, suggesting the disease originated in the Americas and was brought to Naples by sailors
- Influx of disease in the Caribbean
- Millenarianism in colonial societies
- Seasoning (colonialism)
- Uncontacted peoples
