= Great Pestilence =

The Great Pestilence may refer to:

- The Black Death, 13th century bubonic plague epidemic in Europe and Asia
- The Cocoliztli epidemics, 16th century epidemic in Americas
