= History of smallpox in Mexico =

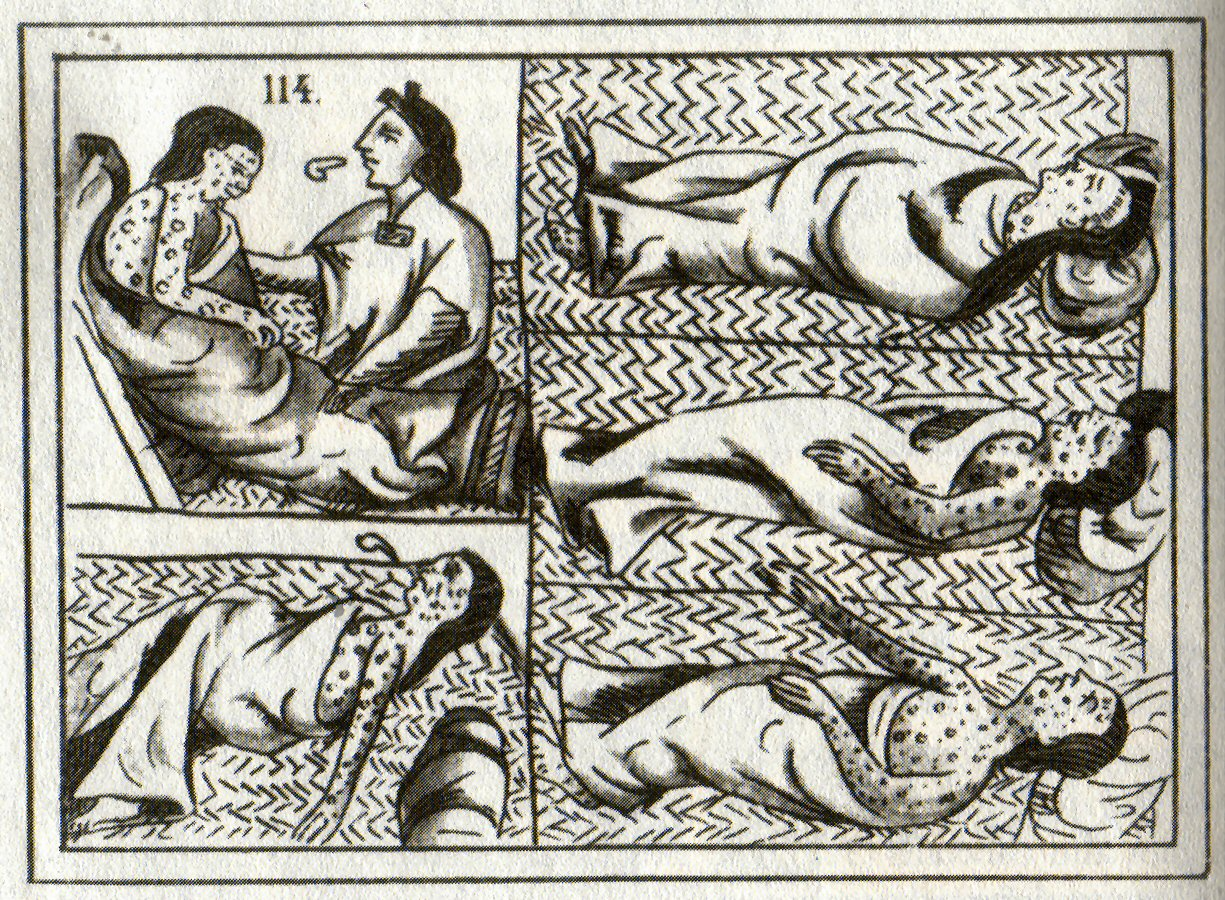
Aztec victims of smallpox.

The history of smallpox in Mexico spans approximately 430 years, from the Spanish invasion and colonization of Central America until its official eradication under the Republic of Mexico in 1951. It was brought to what is now Mexico by the Spanish conquistadores, then spread to the center of Mexico, where it became a significant factor in the fall of Tenochtitlan. During the colonial period, there were major epidemic outbreaks which led to the implementation of sanitary and preventive policy. The introduction of smallpox vaccination in New Spain by Francisco Javier de Balmis and the work of Ignacio Bartolache reduced the mortality and morbidity of the disease.

== Introduction of smallpox ==
Smallpox was an unknown disease not only in the Aztec Empire but in all the American continent, before the European colonization of the Americas (15th century onwards). Indigenous peoples of the Americas had not yet been exposed to the type of diseases that plagued the East, which meant that they had no resistance or immunity against them. It was introduced to Mexican lands by the Spanish conquistadores, and played a significant role in the downfall of the Aztec Empire (1519–1530). Hernán Cortés departed from Spanish-ruled colonial Cuba and arrived in Mexico in 1519, sent to start trade relations only on the coast of Veracruz. However, he disobeyed the Cuban governor Diego Velázquez de Cuéllar and began to invade the mainland. The governor sent Pánfilo de Narváez after Cortés. Narvaez's forces had at least one active case of smallpox infection, and when the Narvaez expedition stopped at Cozumel and Veracruz in 1520, the disease gained a foothold in the region.

The introduction of smallpox among the Aztecs has been attributed to an African slave trafficked by the Spanish colonizers (by the name of Francisco Eguía, according to one account), but this has been disputed. From May to September, smallpox spread slowly to Tepeaca and Tlaxcala, and to Tenochtitlán by the fall of 1520. At this time, Cortes was returning to conquer the city after being thrown out on the Noche Triste.

Cortes names only one indigenous leader who died of smallpox, Maxixcatzin. However, Cuitláhuac and other native rulers also died of smallpox. Chimalpahin reports the death of some lords in Chalco from the disease as well. These deaths were part of a widespread epidemic which devastated the common population. Estimates of mortality range from one-quarter to one-half of the population of central Mexico. Toribio Motolinia, a Spanish Roman Catholic monk that witnessed this epidemic, said: "It became such a great pestilence among them throughout the land that in most provinces more than half the population died; in others the proportion was less. They died in heaps, like bedbugs."

It had been estimated that the population of Mexico fell from over thirty million people before the arrival of Hernan Cortez to 1.5–3 million by 1568. Although the numbers are uncertain, it is estimated that smallpox killed forty to fifty million people in the New World. Regardless of the exact numbers, it is certain that the conquest of the Aztec Empire was greatly influenced by the arrival of the smallpox virus.

== Major outbreaks in the colonial period ==
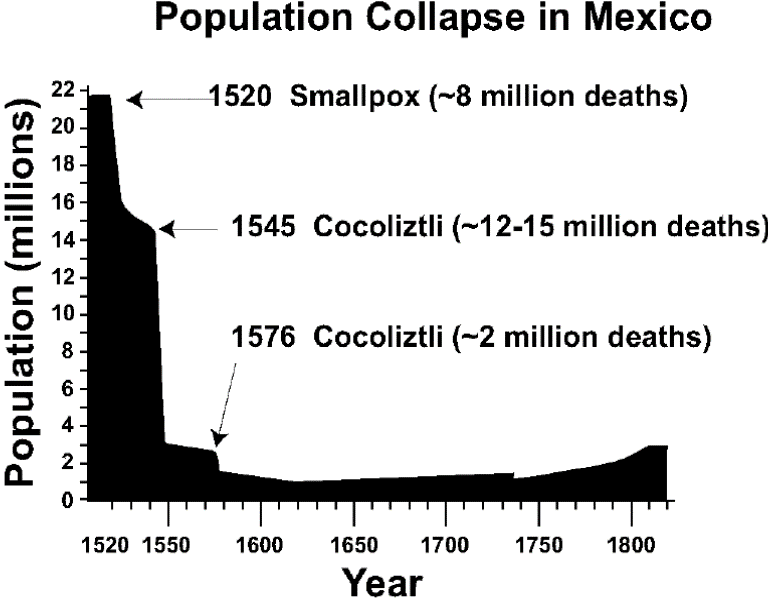
Population collapse in the history of Mexico (16th–17th centuries), attributed to repeated epidemics of smallpox and cocoliztli viruses. The viral outbreaks were caused by the Spanish invasion and colonization of Central America.

Mexico's native population was one of the first to experience a smallpox epidemic, where many succumbed to the disease. In 1520, the first wave of smallpox killed 5–8 million people. From 1545 to 1576, up to 17 million people died from smallpox. This large amount of deaths in the second wave are thought to be the result of hemorrhagic fevers. An article recounts in Spanish texts, "The pestilence of measles and smallpox was so severe and cruel that more than one-fourth of the Indian people in all the land died--and this loss had the effect of hastening the end of the fighting because there died a great quantity of men and warriors and many lords and captains and valiant men against whom we would have had to fight and deal with as enemies, and miraculously Our Lord killed them and removed them from before us." Although the native people of Mexico had no previous contact with smallpox, these Spanish texts showed that the Spanish population was familiar with the disease and the mortality that resulted from it.

During the colonial period, smallpox remained a scourge, especially to the Indigenous population of Mexico. There was a major epidemic between 1790 and 1791 that started in Valley of Mexico, principally affecting children. More people recovered than died. In Mexico City, of 5400 cases admitted to the hospital, 4431 recovered and 1,331 died. This epidemic coincided with the rise of prices of corn and a typhus epidemic, which caused a slight demographic decrease in central Mexico.

The spread of smallpox throughout Mexico followed the communication and trade routes throughout the country. Starting in Peru and traveling to Guatemala, the disease arrived in Tehuantepec and settled there before slowly moving north to Oaxaca, Tehuacan, and eventually reaching Mexico City. The president of Guatemala warned the viceroy in a letter from May 3, 1789, that a ship from Peru had arrived in its Southern coast. Aboard the ship were the daughters of The Regent of the Royal Audencia Don Ambrosio Cerda. Two of the daughters had suffered from smallpox on the voyage and still had fresh scars when they reached the port. By 1798, the epidemic had reached Saltillo and Zacatecas. This outbreak is notable because that was the first time that sanitary and preventive campaigns were implemented in New Spain, such as quarantines, inoculation, isolation and the closing of roads. However, these measures did not always work correctly. In Oaxaca, some of the citizens refused to follow the local officials orders. Miguel Flara, who was sent from Tehuantepec to help in Oaxaca, wrote in a letter from June 1797 that "the people [Oaxacan residents] are a terrible people who will submit to no treatment whatsoever". Residents even went as far as attempting assassinations of some local officials. Closing of roads also showed problems in some of the country's towns because residents would slip through them against local official's orders. The residents needed to get to their crops, livestock, and the market in order to keep their economy afloat.

Different institutions provided health and public services to fight against the smallpox epidemic: the most important were The "Ayuntamiento" or city council. The Catholic Church and "Real Tribunal del Protomedicato", which was an institution founded in 1630, managed all sanitary aspects of New Spain including the establishment of quarantines. Charity boards were created, where rich people of the city donated money to build hospitals and to help and cure the sick. This charity board was led by the Spanish archbishop Alonso Núñez de Haro y Peralta. The interest of rich people to help the poor was not purely philanthropic, as the death of those sectors caused economic problems because indigenous population was not able to pay tribute or work.

The Church-managed hospitals and cemeteries forced people to bury dead people with lime at the outside of cities. The isolation of sick people in hospitals or charities at the outsides of the cities was another important measure to stop the smallpox infection. These institutions took care of patients and provided them food and medicine. During the 1797 and 1798 outbreak, they also provided inoculation and were called inoculation houses. Although inoculation was practiced, the miasma theory of disease was still believed.

In 1796, Gaceta de México published an article in which the use of inoculation was promoted, giving examples of kings and important persons who underwent the procedure. In January 1798, the eradication of the 1790s epidemic was declared. The government proposed that the measures taken in that epidemic be implemented as the official policy in the case of a new epidemic, and it was approved by city council in April 1799. Viceroy Miguel José de Azanza, ordered an article written on 14 November 1799 about the benefits resulting from the inoculation in the 1790s epidemic and distributed to the population.

In 1803, Spanish doctor Francisco Javier Balmis started a vaccination program against smallpox in New Spain, better known as Balmis Expedition, which reduced the severity and mortality in the epidemics that followed. Before Balmis, Dr José María Arboleyda started a vaccination campaign in 1801 but this was not successful.

There was another important outbreak in 1814 which started in Veracruz and extended to Mexico City, Tlaxcala and Hidalgo. This epidemic caused Viceroy Félix Calleja to take preventive measures like fumigations and vaccination, which were successful.

There were sporadic outbreaks until 1826 when smallpox appeared in Yucatán, Tabasco and Veracruz brought by North American ships. In 1828, there were reported cases in Hidalgo, Oaxaca, State of Mexico, Guerrero, Chiapas, Chihuahua and Mexico City.

== Early eradication ==
Efforts to eradicate smallpox in Mexico started when José Ignacio Bartolache wrote a book in 1779 about smallpox treatment called Instrucción que puede servir para que se cure a los enfermos de las viruelas epidemicas que ahora se padecen en México (Instructions that may help to cure smallpox in Mexico) in which he included an introduction describing the disease and instructions to treat it, such as drinking warm water with salt and honey, gargling with water and vinegar, keep tidy and clean and finish treatment by taking a purgative. He thought that smallpox was a remedy of nature to clear bad mood and doctors should not accelerate the process of healing because it was against nature. He wrote a letter to propose his measures as a strategy to combat smallpox in which he also included recommendations like purifying the air with gunpowder and scents, ventilating churches where bodies were buried, and building cemeteries outside the city. This strategy was approved by City Council in September 1779.

The next phase of eradication started in 1803 when Francisco Javier de Balmis started a vaccination campaign in New Spain. This has been considered one of the first vaccination campaigns of the world. Francisco led the Royal Philanthropic Expedition of the Vaccine, which was also called the Balmis Expedition. Spanish King Charles IV authorized the vaccine to be brought from Spain into their other territories. Twenty-two orphaned children were used in this expedition for arm-to-arm inoculation. The expedition eventually departed from Cuba and landed in the port of Sisal of Mexico's Yucatán Peninsula on June 25, 1804. The crew continued to inoculate the citizens of Mexico over the next year. When the expedition finished in Mexico in 1805, they left from the port of Acapulco with 25 Mexican orphans with them to start more work in the Philippines. The previous 22 Spanish orphans who helped with inoculation stayed in Mexico under the supervision of the Bishop of Puebla.

The Balmis Expedition crew were not the only people to bring the vaccine into Mexico during this time. The personal physician of Viceroy José de Iturrigaray, Dr. Alejandro Garcia de Arboleya, brought the vaccine to Veracruz in April 1804. It reached Chihuahua in May of that year, which resulted in a vaccine campaign led by Nemesio de Salcedo, the General Commander of the Interior Provinces of New Spain. The vaccine was then sent from Chihuahua to New Mexico and Texas, since this is prior to the Mexican–American War and they were still a part of Mexico's territory. Mexico also had immunization boards that included members of the Catholic clergy. These board members would meet weekly to look over how the different regions of the country were doing and they kept records at local churches.

Children inoculation programs were introduced in a Mexican province called Guanajuato Mexico by Juan de Riaño in October 1797. Riaños goal was to institute a program that would allow him to inoculate the children of Guanajuato in attempts to save them from the deadly disease. Riaño aware that parents would not agree with the inoculation of their children. Riaño decided to use his own six children as examples and had them inoculated first in hopes that this act would encourage other parents to bring their children forward. The inoculation process held in Guanajuato consisted of a physician making deep scratched into the arms of the children and rubbing organic matter containing the live smallpox virus into the wounds. The results of this inoculation attempt resulted in immunity by artificially introducing a benign case of smallpox. Ultimately the point Juan de Riaño was trying to make was that the risk of dying from inoculation was far less than acquiring smallpox naturally.

== Modern-day eradication ==
Eradication efforts were always present in Mexican history, but the 20th century showed a more successful plan for research, disease prevention, and vaccination. The Vaccination and Revaccination Act was instated in 1925, making it legally required for citizens to be vaccinated from smallpox and revaccinated every 5 years. This act was installed under the administration of General Plutarco Elías Calles. During the 1920s, Mexico's government also published guidelines that federal and local governments had to follow regarding organizing revaccination programs, containing disease, reporting cases, and handling vaccines. These guidelines were all a part of the first Mexican Health Code. These efforts continued into the 1930s, as health care workers in the country worked diligently to eliminate this disease. In 1935, a mobile crew was set up by the Federal Health Service to help. Medical professionals and volunteers lending their hands and effectively administered 6 million vaccine doses from 1935 to 1936.

In the 1940s, there were a few setbacks. The institute that was manufacturing the vaccine, Mexico City's Hygiene Institute, was using glycerinated lymph. This meant that the vaccine had to be refrigerated in a specific temperature or else it would no longer work. Mexico is home to various rural villages and towns that did not have access to the type of refrigeration needed to hold the vaccines. It was very difficult to get the vaccine to the thousands of people living in smaller communities. Despite the challenges, the vaccinators hard work resulted in over 28 million vaccines given from 1944 to 1949. However, in 1943, the National Campaign to Combat Smallpox was created, with the slogan, "Coordination, Uniformity, and Generalization." This committee was an action taken towards eradicating smallpox in Mexico through campaigning through systematic and routine work regarding the vaccine. They mainly pursued smaller and rural communities that had been harder or had less resources to combat the disease. Smallpox was officially declared eradicated from Mexico in 1951.

== See also ==
- European colonization of the Americas
  - American Indian Wars
  - Atlantic slave trade
  - Canadian Indian residential school system
  - Catholic Church and the Age of Discovery
  - Columbian Exchange
  - Early impact of Mesoamerican goods in Iberian society
  - Jesuit missions in North America
  - Native American people and Mormonism
  - Puritan migration to New England (1620–1640)
  - Valladolid debate
- History of smallpox
- Native American disease and epidemics
- New World
- Population history of the Indigenous peoples of the Americas
