= Influx of disease in the Caribbean =

Disease proliferation due to colonialism

The first European contact in 1492 started an influx of communicable diseases into the Caribbean. Diseases originating in the Old World (Afro-Eurasia) came to the New World (the Americas) for the first time, resulting in demographic and sociopolitical changes due to the Columbian Exchange from the late 15th century onwards. While some of the indigenous died of disease, others died of harsh working conditions. These working conditions were enforced because of the sugar cane in the area. The colonists were realizing that the number of people working was decreasing quickly, so they brought enslaved Africans to work there. These Africans brought more disease to the indigenous, killing more of them. The Indigenous peoples of the Americas had little immunity to the predominantly Old World diseases, resulting in significant loss of life and contributing to their enslavement and exploitation perpetrated by the European colonists. Waves of enslaved Africans were brought to replace the dwindling Indigenous populations, solidifying the position of disease in triangular trade.

== Infectious diseases ==
Before the first wave of European colonization, the Indigenous peoples of the Americas and the Caribbean are thought to have lived with infrequent epidemic diseases, brought about by limited contact between tribes. This left them socially and biologically unprepared when the Italian explorer Christopher Columbus and his crew introduced several infectious diseases, including typhus, smallpox, influenza, whooping cough, and measles following his 1492 voyage to the Americas. The Old World diseases spread from the carriers to the Indigenous populations, who had no immunity, leading to more serious cases and higher mortality. Because the Indigenous societies of the Americas were not used to the diseases as European nations were at the time, there was no system in place to care for the sick. The pigs aboard Columbus’ ships in 1493 immediately spread swine flu, which sickened Columbus and other Europeans and proved deadly to the native Taino population on Hispaniola, who had no prior exposure to the virus. In Cuba, Jamaica, Haiti, the Dominican Republic, Puerto Rico, and the Lesser Antilles, 90% of the Native population may have died within a half-century. On a second voyage to the Caribbean island of Hispaniola, the fleet of Christopher Columbus carries domestic cattle infected with an influenza virus that sweeps through the Taíno. Epidemics kill countless numbers and spread to Cuba and Florida along Taíno trade routes.

Smallpox is among the most notable of diseases in the Columbian Exchange due to the high number of deaths and impact on life for Indigenous societies. Smallpox first broke out in the Americas on the island of Hispaniola in 1518. The disease was carried over from Europe, where it had been endemic for over seven hundred years. Like the other diseases introduced in the time period, the Europeans were familiar with the treatment of the disease and had some natural immunity, which reduced mortality and facilitated quicker recovery. The Taíno people, who inhabited Hispaniola, had no natural smallpox immunity and were unfamiliar with treating epidemic disease.

In 1493, the first recorded influenza epidemic to strike the Americas occurred on the island of Hispaniola in the northern Spanish settlement of Isabela. The virus was introduced to the Isle of Santo Domingo by the Cristóbal Cólon, which docked at La Isabela on 10 December 1493, carrying about 2,000 Spanish passengers. Despite the general poor health of the colony, Columbus returned in 1494 and found that the Native American population had been affected by disease even more catastrophically than Isabela's first settlers were. By 1506, only a third of the native population remained. The Taíno population before European contact is estimated to have been between 60,000 and 8 million people, and the entire nation was virtually extinct 50 years after contact, which has primarily been attributed to the infectious diseases.

After the first European contact, social disruption and epidemic diseases led to a decline in the Amerindian population. Because the Indigenous societies, including the Taínos, were unfamiliar with the diseases, they were unprepared to deal with the social consequences. The high number of people incapacitated by the disease disrupted the regular cycles of agriculture and hunting that sustained the Native American populations. This led to increased dependence on the Europeans, and reduced capacity to resist the European invasion. The eventual enslavement of the Taíno people by the Europeans compounded the effects of the epidemics in the downfall of the Indigenous societies.

== Impact of the transatlantic slave trade ==
As the population of enslaved Indigenous peoples fell due to disease and abuse, the Spanish and Portuguese conquistadors began to import enslaved workers from Africa in 1505. Until 1800 the population rose as slaves arrived from West Africa. Because there was already an established European colonial presence in Africa at the time, the enslaved Africans were less vulnerable to disease than the Taíno people on Hispaniola. However, they came carrying their own diseases, including malaria. At the time, malaria was endemic both in Europe and Africa, though more prevalent in the latter continent. The climate of the Caribbean was hospitable to mosquitoes of the genus Anopheles, which acts as a vector for the disease and allowed it to spread. Many of the African-born enslaved people had genetic protections against malaria that Indigenous enslaved people did not. As malaria, smallpox, and other diseases spread the Indigenous populations continued to fall, which increased the motivation for the Spanish and Portuguese colonists to continue to import more enslaved workers from Africa. This enslaved people worked in mining and agriculture, driving the development of triangular trade. Despite the devastation of the early colonial era, the Taíno passed on their knowledge about their natural and cultural world to Europeans and Africans who arrived on the islands, and Native culture and people survive—and thrive—today. Now popular Caribbean culture, particularly rural culture, derives from Native traditions.

== See also ==
- Catholic Church and the Age of Discovery
- Columbian Exchange
- HIV/AIDS in the Caribbean
- Malaria and the Caribbean
- Native American disease and epidemics
- Seasoning (colonialism)
- Timeline of European imperialism
- Triangular trade
- Virgin soil epidemic

== Bibliography ==
- Engerman, Stanley L. "A Population History of the Caribbean", pp. 483–528 in A Population History of North America Michael R. Haines and Richard Hall Steckel (Eds.), Cambridge University Press, 2000, ISBN 0-521-49666-7.
