= Colonial epidemic disease in Hawaii =

Hawaiian epidemic disease

Colonial epidemic disease in Hawaii has greatly threatened the Native Hawaiian population since its introduction to the islands over a hundred years ago. Beginning with the first colonizers led by Captain James Cook that arrived in the islands in 1778, all the way up until today, foreign disease has been present in Native Hawaiians. As Hawaii was so secluded and contained a population of only the Hawaiian people, the islands were considered a "virgin population." This meant that once foreigners arrived, the Native Hawaiian population was decimated by these illnesses while Europeans remained healthy. Some of these diseases included gonorrhea, syphilis, influenza, cholera, tuberculosis, the mumps, measles, smallpox, and leprosy (which led to the creation of a leper colony on Molokai in the mid-1800s). While each disease brought a different outcome, they all contributed to the reduction of the Native Hawaiian population as they collectively caused more than 100,000 deaths.

These illnesses wreaked havoc on the Hawaiian islands and they killed almost all of the Native population. By 1840, only 62 years after Cook brought the first diseases, the number of Native Hawaiians may have fallen by up to 84%. The U.S. Census of 1920 declared that there were only 24,000 Native Hawaiians — a number down from hundreds of thousands. As of 2015, 26% of Hawaii residents have Hawaiian ancestry. This adverse effect on the population from outsiders was at first an unintended consequence of contact, as Captain Cook himself had tried to keep his diseased men away from Native women, but was later used as a way to discriminate against the Hawaiian people. The number of deaths caused by the interaction with outsiders (specifically Europeans and Americans) is comparable to death rates of recognized genocides. While the initial population is contested, it is believed that the Native Hawaiian population lay somewhere between 300,000 and one million. As stated above, this number was down to 24,000 by 1920, after many colonial diseases had spread through the islands. Since then the population has returned to about 560,000 people nationwide that identify with Native Hawaiian ancestry.

== First diseases ==
Very little is known about disease in Hawaii before Western presence. While there was certainly trauma-related disease and other degenerative illnesses (including evidence of cancer in fossil bones) before Western influence, it is not known if there were any large epidemics that eliminated a significant number of people. The first accounts of major disease in the Hawaiian Islands trace back to early settlers and explorers like Captain James Cook, a British explorer who arrived at the Hawaiian Islands (which he called the Sandwich Islands) in the late 1770s.

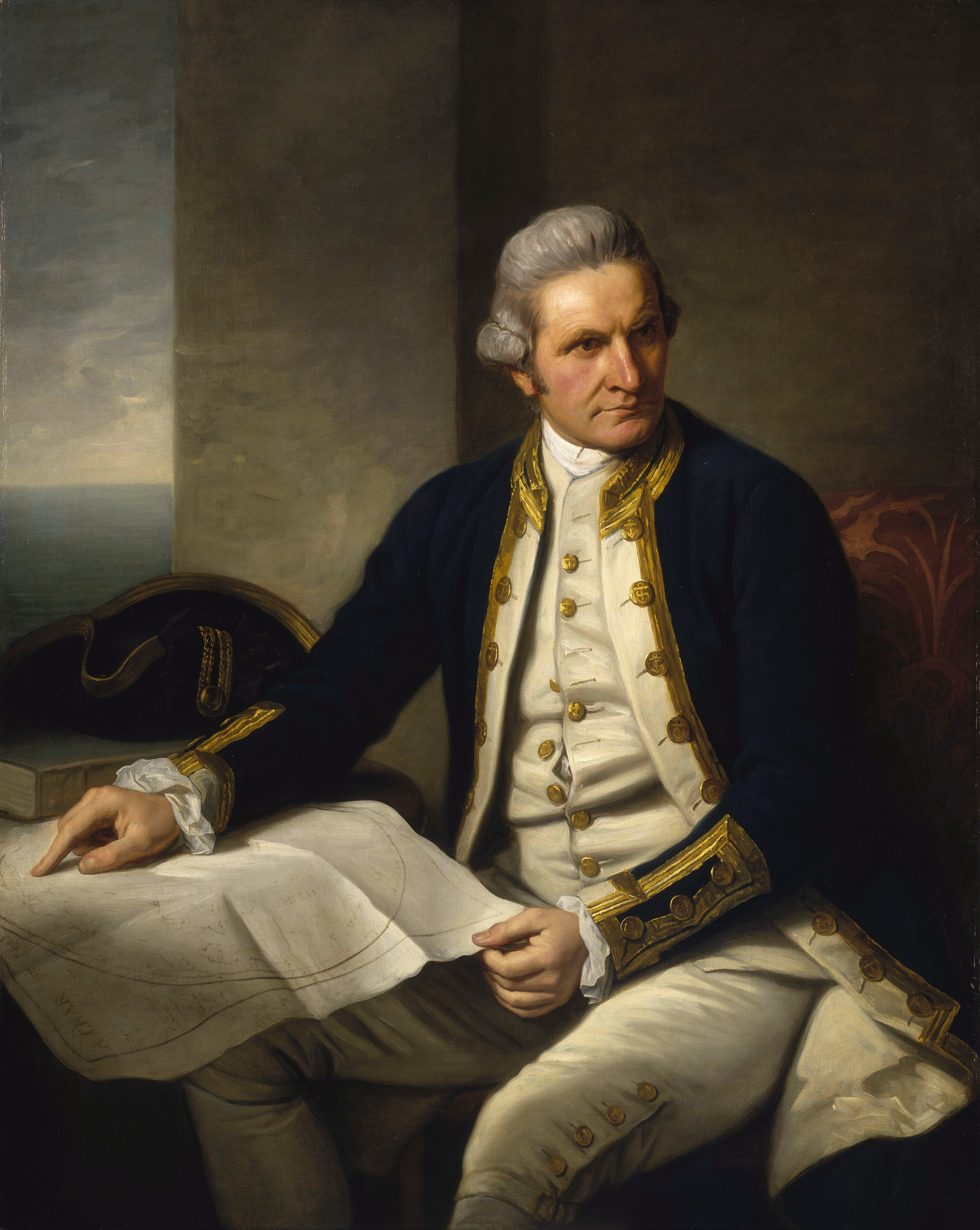
Captain James Cook

=== The arrival of James Cook ===
Captain Cook made two voyages to the Hawaiian islands with his ships and crew. On these two voyages, the crew members brought two venereal diseases. While historians do not know for sure what exactly these ailments were, they are assumed to be gonorrhoea and syphilis. Captain Cook was aware that the men on his ship were most likely afflicted with these diseases, and despite the fact that epidemiology was not an understood science at this point, Captain Cook knew enough to understand the dangers of bringing his crew ashore. Because of this, Cook decided to keep his men on the boat, and keep all Native women away from the boat so as not to transmit these diseases into the native population. Despite his efforts, he was unsuccessful. There were instances of Cook's crew having sexual relations with the Native Hawaiian women, transmitting these venereal diseases to them and introducing the illnesses into the population as a whole.

==== First landfall in January 1778 ====
Cook and his crew made their first voyage to Hawaii on January 18, 1778, on the coast of Kauai. On this trip, their contact was contained to this island (mostly the leeward coast) and Niihau. During their time docked near the islands, stormy seas pushed the men onto the shore of Niihau, where they were able to interact with the Native population. Primary accounts from crew members such as the on-board surgeon suggest that many of the shipmates had sexual relationships with the Native women. This was enough to introduce disease, even though they stayed only a few weeks, leaving on 2 February.

==== Second landfall in November 1778 ====
After exploring more of the North Pacific seas, Captain Cook returned his crew to the Hawaiian Islands, docking on November 26, 1778. This time they stopped in Maui and were greeted by the Native people complaining of venereal diseases that they were not able to cure. While this was most likely gonorrhea, syphilis is also thought to have arrived on Maui by this point due to inter-island travel. There were also multiple accounts from Cook's shipmates that spoke of accusations by the Native Hawaiians that claim Cook's men brought these diseases. This marked the beginning of a poor relationship between the Hawaiians and Captain Cook, who was eventually killed by Native Hawaiians in 1779.

==== Implications of these diseases ====
While individual diseases like syphilis and gonorrhea may not have caused large numbers of deaths on their own, the combined impact of venereal diseases, as evidenced by Captain Cook's documented concerns, led to a dramatic increase in the death rate among Native Hawaiians. Furthermore, these diseases wreaked havoc on future generations by causing widespread infertility/sterility and early childhood death. Gonorrhea made a great number of Hawaiians infertile which greatly limited the growth of future populations. Syphilis, on the other hand, was much more debilitating, causing slow and painful deterioration. While this did not lead to infertility as much, it caused higher rates of miscarriages and lower rates of childhood survival which similarly hindered the creation of a new generation Infertility became a huge issue among Native Hawaiians as it was widespread and impactful. Additionally, it is estimated that in the first two years after Cook's arrival on the islands, 1 in 17 Natives died, resulting in a Hawaiian population decline of nearly 50% within the first 20 years.

== Colonial disease in the 1800s ==
The history of colonial disease in Hawaii did not end with Captain Cook's diseases. Throughout the 1800s and into the 1900s, Hawaii was hit with many more outbreaks of disease. In 1803, a plague (thought to be yellow fever) came to the islands killing possibly up to 175,000 people. Later diseases included influenza (1845–49), measles (1848), smallpox (1853), leprosy (1865-1969), cholera (1895), bubonic plague (1899), mumps, tuberculosis, and more. Throughout this century of diseases in Hawai'i, first-hand accounts mention the immense tragedy, and feelings of having more Hawaiians dying than living. In total, the Native Hawaiian population dwindled to around 39,000 people (from 150 to 200 thousand) by the end of the 1800s.

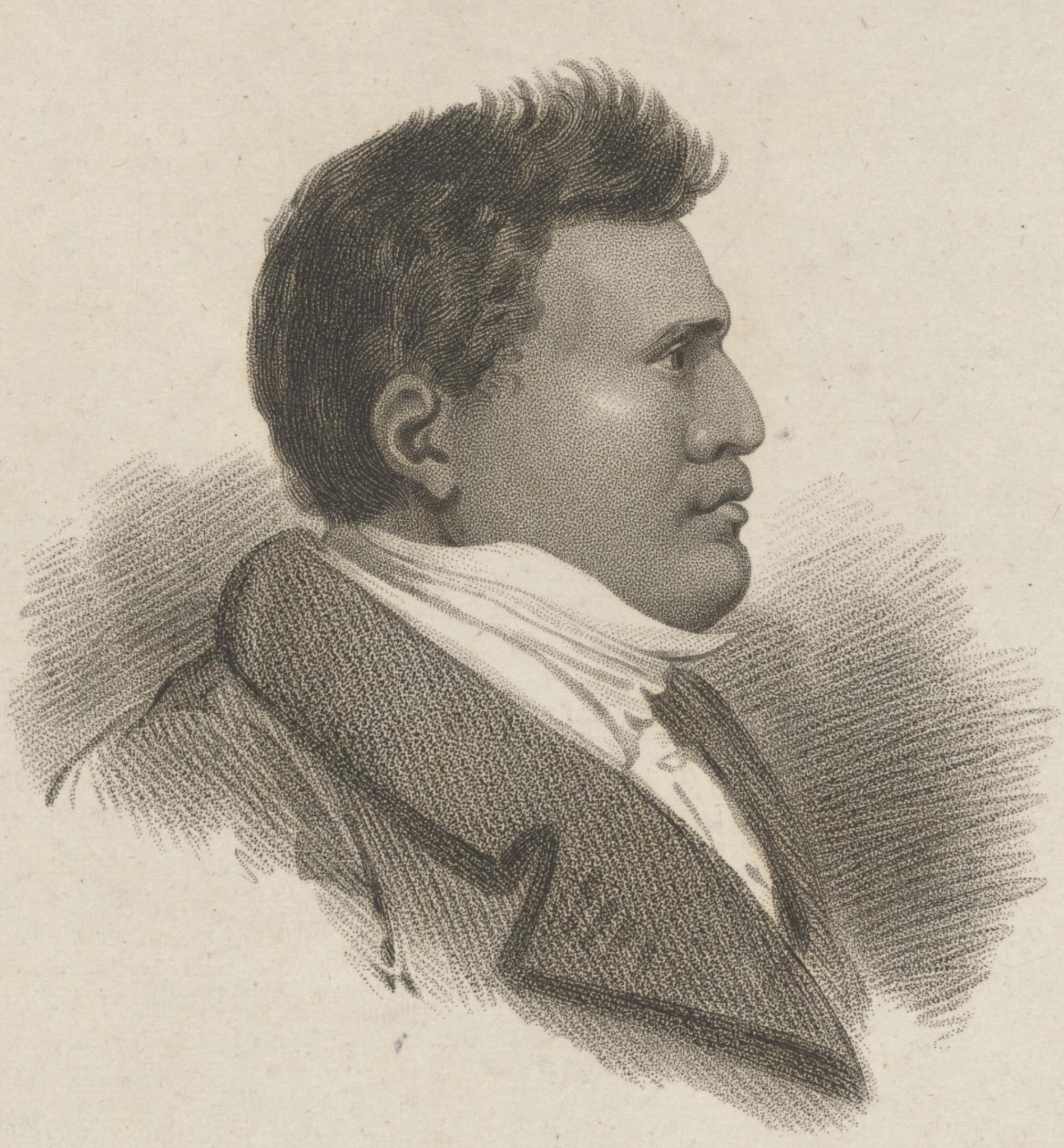
King Kamehameha II

=== Measles (1848) ===
Measles epidemics have been present in the Pacific islands for many years, and Hawaii is no exception. Before it even hit the islands though, it was deadly to Hawaii's traveling King and Queen. In 1824, King Kamehameha II and Queen Kamāmalu traveled to England in hopes to meet with the King. While there, they quickly contracted measles, and died abroad from complications with the disease. Measles was later brought to Hawaii in 1848 with Christian missionaries and other Western crews, and quickly spread through the islands. By the end of the epidemic, it is estimated that between 10% and 33% of the Hawaiian population had died. Since the outbreak of 1848, there have been six other major outbreaks of measles.

=== Leprosy (1865-1969) ===
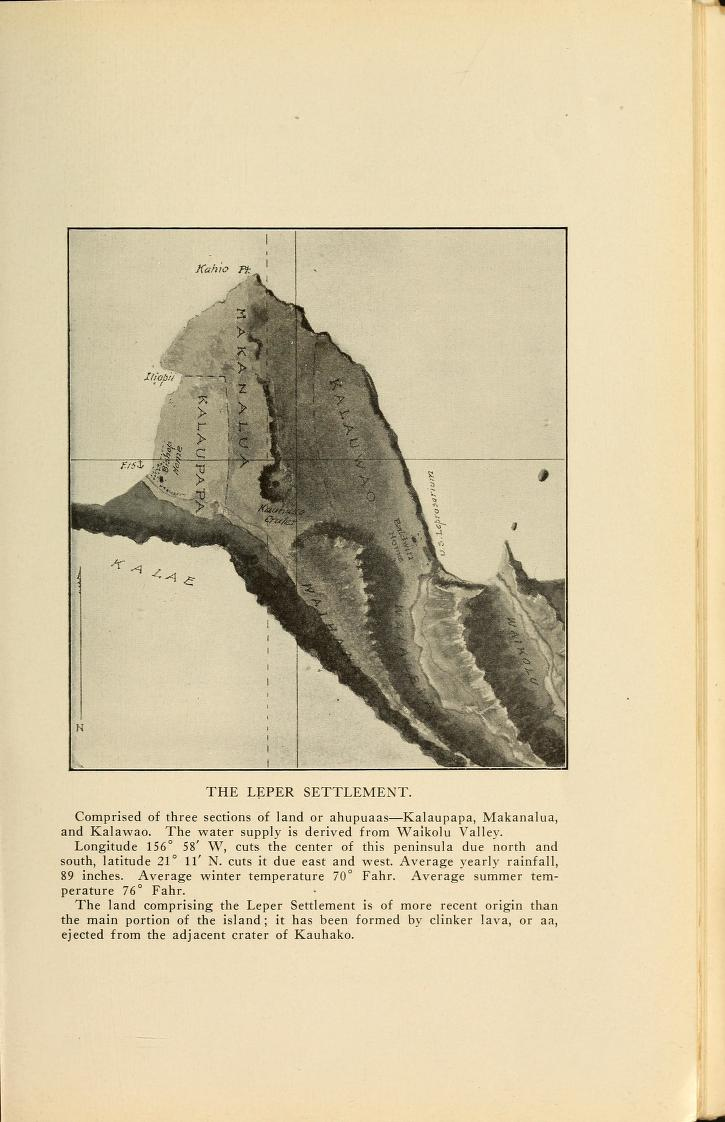
The Kalaupapa Leper Settlement

The advent of leprosy (also known as Hansen's Disease) in the Hawaiian Islands brought separation and immense sadness to the Hawaiian people. The disease was brought to the islands in the mid-1800s and was widespread by the 1860s. Leprosy is not always a death sentence, but its degenerative nature, which tends to leave patients deformed, contributes to its status as a stigmatized disease. Hawaiians' little disease immunity again played a factor in the leprosy epidemic — leprosy is a disease that many are innately immune to and thus has a slow spread rate, however since most Hawaiians did not have this immunity, it spread more quickly. This allowed colonial onlookers and Western health advisors to blame the spread on Hawaiian culture and way of life, calling them dirty, and heathens, tying it to the ancient falsehood that there is a connection between leprosy and morality.

==== The creation of the leper colony ====
Beginning at around 1865, residents of Hawaii that were thought to be infected with Hansen's Disease were labeled "lepers" and were forcefully removed to a very remote section of Molokai called Kalaupapa. This "leper colony" was demanded by Western advisors, who stated that this was the only solution. Records have later shown that a number of families living with infected people did not contract the disease themselves (less than 5%).

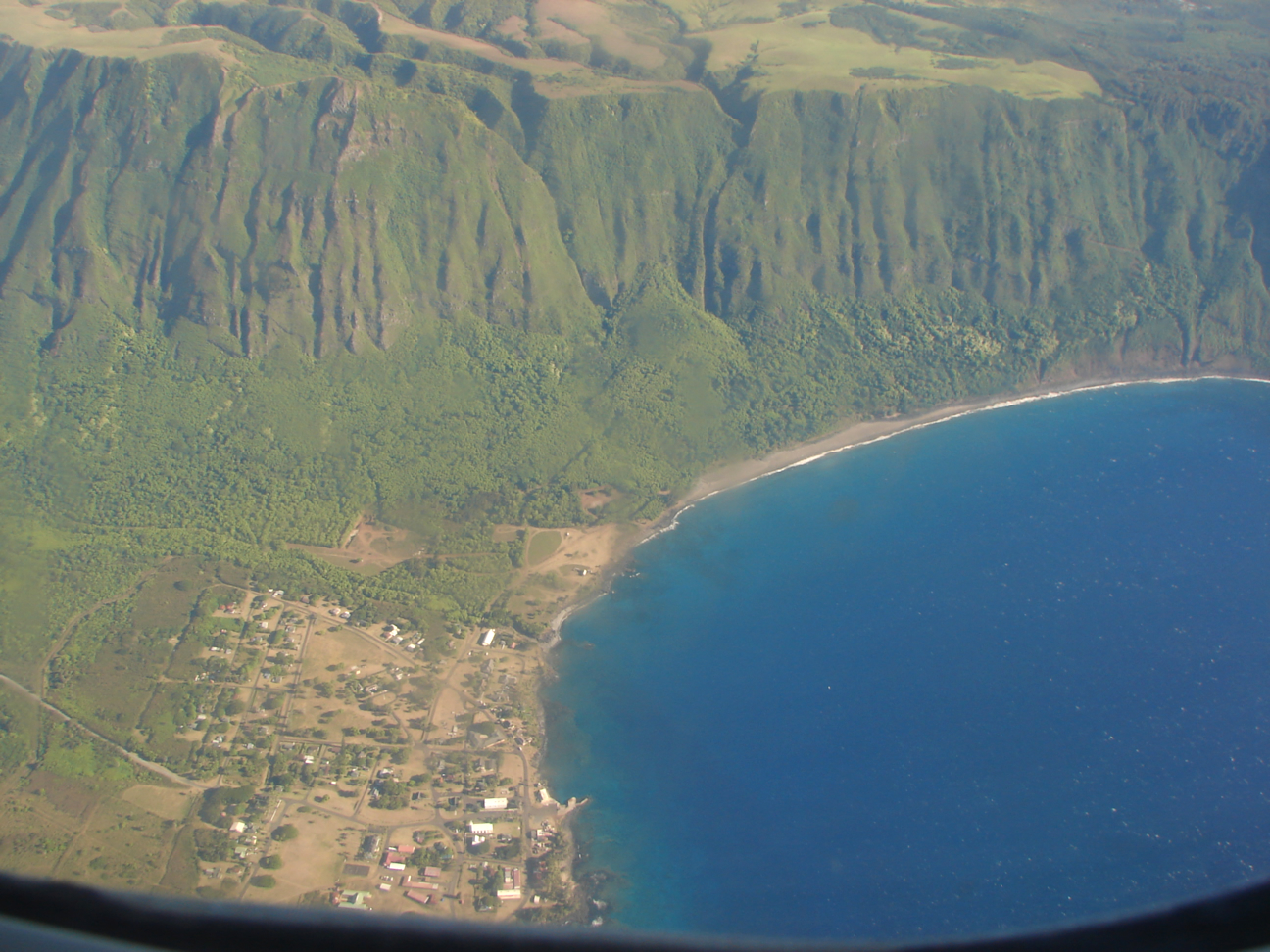
Kalaupapa Village

People of all ages were sent away to this "leper colony," and were not given the chance to say goodbye to their families nor allowed to return home. As many of these patients were children, they lost track of their families as they grew up, and made new lives within this small community (more than 1000 couples met and got married there). About two to three shipments of "lepers" were sent to Kalaupapa per year, adding up to more than 8,000 people between the years of 1866 and 1969, when the quarantine restriction ended (over 100 years). Of these 8,000 people, 97% were Native Hawaiians. As this time period coincided with the overthrow of the Hawaiian Kingdom, many scholars note that sending away Native Hawaiians made it easier for Western colonizers to slowly disempower the nation.

== Political implications of colonial disease ==
The introduction of foreign disease and the subsequent decline of the Hawaiian population had many implications for the future relations between Hawaiians and Western foreigners. Missionaries and colonizers began viewing disease among Hawaiians as a way to discriminate, attributing Hawaiians' proneness to illness to their culture and their supposed uncleanliness and immorality. A survey conducted in 1848 that asked missionaries about the causes of Hawaiian population decrease, brought up possible causes such as "licentiousness, bad mothering, impotence due to excessive sex during youth, native houses, native doctors, lack of land tenure, inappropriate use of clothing, idolatry, indolence, and lack of value on life." Scholars note this as a way for colonizers to claim superiority and legitimize themselves as rulers over the Native people and their land. In the mid-late 1800's, colonizers designation of much of the Hawaiian population as being "lepers," and thus contaminants to western civilization, allowed them to both send Hawaiians away and find a reason to discriminate against them. It is also within the time frame of the leprosy epidemic that American business men overthrew the Hawaiian government and took control.

== Population regrowth ==
After the very abrupt and drastic decline of the Native Hawaiian population, it took time for the Hawaiians to rebound. There was a long period of relatively little population change when the numbers were at their lowest. This began to change in the late 1900s when population started to bounce back. A large portion of Hawaiians being born in this time were those of part-Hawaiian descent, as the mixing of outsiders and Natives led to a multiracial generation. This eventually led to a change in the U.S. census and the way the US Government thought about the Hawaiian population numbers. In 2000, the U.S. changed the census to allow participants to check off more than one race. This change led to a soaring number of Hawaiian identifying individuals. In fact, of the Native Hawaiian population in the United States, only 33% identify as only Hawaiian: 36% identify as being two races, and 26% identify as being three. Many of these people though, do not live on the islands — 40% of Hawaiians live on the mainland United States, and only 6% of the entire state population of Hawaii claim Native Hawaiian ancestry. Despite the scattered diaspora though, population projections for the Hawaiian population are going up. According to the Pew Research Center, the Native Hawaiian population on the Hawaiian islands is estimated to be over 500 thousand Hawaiian individuals by 2045, and up to 675 thousand by 2060 (from the current population of around 300 thousand). What this creates is a u-shaped curve that displays a rapid decline in population size after colonial presence, followed by a lull in small population and then a rapid growth pattern. This growth is so significant that the population is now approaching numbers that it has not seen since pre-contact over 200 years ago.
