= Impact of the COVID-19 pandemic on Native American tribes and tribal communities =

Effects of the viral outbreak on tribal communities

The impact of the COVID-19 pandemic on Native American tribes and tribal communities has been severe and has emphasized underlying inequalities in Native American communities compared to the majority of the American population. The pandemic exacerbated existing healthcare and other economic and social disparities between Native Americans and other racial and ethnic groups in the United States. Along with black Americans, Latinos, and Pacific Islanders, the death rate in Native Americans due to COVID-19 was twice that of white and Asian Americans, with Native Americans having the highest mortality rate of all racial and ethnic groups nationwide. As of January 5, 2021, the mortality impact in Native American populations from COVID-19 was 1 in 595 or 168.4 deaths in 100,000, compared to 1 in 1,030 for white Americans and 1 in 1,670 for Asian Americans. Prior to the pandemic, Native Americans were already at a higher risk for infectious disease and mortality than any other group in the United States.

Tribal support offered by Centers for Disease Control and Prevention

== Background ==
=== Pre-pandemic conditions ===
Many Native Americans live in crowded conditions and with multiple generations in a single household, creating difficulties for social distancing and isolation within households. In addition to crowded living situations, many Native Americans live on tribal reservations which generally have substandard housing or face inadequate housing when living off-reservations. Other issues facing Native Americans include limited access to water, food insecurity, lack of phone service, and children relying on schools to provide breakfast and lunch. According to the Kaiser Family Foundation, data "indicates that a majority of American Indians/Alaska Natives have fewer years of education and are three times more likely to live in poverty and be uninsured than the U.S. general population."

In addition to the aforementioned difficulties faced by those living on tribal reservations, lack of access to healthcare services and facilities also served as a widespread pre-pandemic condition. The Indian Health Service, which provides health care to the 2.2 million members of America's tribal communities, was already underfunded and understaffed before the pandemic. According to Kevin Allis who currently serves as the CEO of the National Congress of American Indians, "the IHS has only 1257 hospital beds and 36 intensive care units, and many people covered by the IHS are hours away from the nearest IHS facility."

== Impact of the Pandemic ==
=== Population Change ===
COVID-19 has instantly become a threat to the health and survival of indigenous people. According to the CDC, many American Indian and Alaskan Native people are nearly twice as likely to die from COVID-19 compare to non-Hispanic Whites. The population of American Indians and Alaska Native (AIAN) has significantly dropped during the COVID pandemic. The study showed that "for every 100,000 in the population, 737 AIAN people have died for COVID-19 versus 105 whites." Indigenous communities are facing tremendous high COVID-19 infection and mortality rates.

=== Cultural Crisis ===
One of the major effects for indigenous people under the pandemic is the cultural crisis because tribe elders are dying from the pandemic. The virus took many elders live from many different tribes. According to The New York Times, COVID had already taken away 4 elders in Standing Rock Reservation, N.D. One of the sons said "It takes your breath away. The amount of knowledge they held, and connection to our past." Elders are normally holding as a crucial role in supporting both formal and informal education in the indigenous community. They inherited tradition, knowledge, value, culture to the next generations. The deaths of elders in indigenous tribes have put their cultural beliefs at risk.

=== Exacerbating Health Disparities ===
There have been many Native American tribes altering their lifestyles concerning the pandemic.

The Leech Lake Band of the Ojibwe Tribal government released a statement noting a significant jump of cases from 3 to 27 over a 2-week period and this has urged members to wear their masks and practice methods of social distancing each and every day.

In Central Minnesota, The Millie Lacs Band of the Ojibwe officials have reported up to 19 cases of confirmed COVID-19 patients. The Millie Lacs Band health and human services commissioner, Nicole Anderson exclaims, “I feel like we are doing okay, and we are managing, but I believe a huge part of that was the work we did on the front end to be ready for the pandemic.” The tribe of Millie Lacs recently started randomly testing members for the COVID-19 antibodies which would indicate whether a tribe members immune system had previously been exposed to another member of the tribe who had the virus and a better understanding of the fast spreading of mutations of the virus.

Many indigenous members have been getting hit extremely hard from the virus. While tribes have worked hard and endless hours to do everything in their power to slow down the virus, the detrimental effects of the deadly sickness are harming members. “American Indians have the highest proportion of cases that result in hospitalization or the need for intensive care. They also have the highest rate of deaths among those who test positive for the virus”

=== Social impact ===
In June 2020, Native Americans in New Mexico accounted for 57% of COVID-19 infections, while representing 11% of the state's population. In October 2020, Navajo Nation had the highest death rate from COVID-19 than any state in the nation, with 560 deaths and Native Americans in Wyoming accounted for 30% of COVID-19 deaths in the state. Many Native American households rely on the income of one or two members and many of those jobs were in the service industries. Many of these jobs were lost when states and communities shut down throughout 2020.

The City of Mahnomen which is utilized and occupied for tribal members of the Ojibwe Tribe and council who are consistently providing resources to members of the city and they serve to the residents of the community. The COVID-19 pandemic is formulating a drastic sense of uncertainty for the public and members of the local tribe. The city is working hard and persistently to provide as much information and aid to the residents of the city's citizens and local businesses.

The city of Mahnomen is also on Food Proto-call, “They pre-package food orders and they can be picked up through drive-through that is near the food store.” They ask for no one to be sent to pick up the food if they have any sick-like systems or a compromised immune system. They have been taking orders on a first-come, first-served basis and a priority for elders.

=== Economic impact ===
The pandemic forced the closure of tribal casinos, hotels, and other tourist destinations, on which many tribes and tribal communities relied on for income. Most were able to reopen during 2020 and 2021, with some re-closures. Despite safety protocols, many casinos led to outbreaks and increased positive cases.

The American Gaming Association created a COVID-19 tracker to provide information to the public on the status of all tribal and commercial casinos in the country. The CDC created a webpage with information for casinos on how to safely reopen.

The White Earth Reservation is the homeland to the White Earth Band, who are located in Northwestern regions of Minnesota. This is also home to the Largest Indian reservation in the state of Minnesota. The White Earth Reservation is home too many different various members of the Ojibwe Tribe. In regard to the economic and financial impacts, The White Earth Reservation Business Committee, has guaranteed more than $8.3 million to COVID-19 Relief assistance to enrolled members of the White Earth Band membership.

Any member over the age of 18 that has endured the devastating consequences and outcomes of the viral pandemic will receive a $500 payment and there will be an application process to apply for this grant. For this specific grant, The White Earth Reservation was awarded more than a total of $29 million in the Coronavirus Aid Relief and Economic Security (CARES) Act.

The City of Mahnomen is working vigorously to provide a state grant program to assist all resident and local business to cope with the expensive bills, due to the lack of hours and reduced income from the effects of this global pandemic. The city is in the process of securing grant dollars to fund this program for local business. The businesses that have been affected from the pandemic have received a “bridge loan” form the city who set up a 15-month term 0%. This is granted to any small business located within the City of Mahnomen funding's are available to set up to $6,000 and if you are small business located in the White Earth Reservation funding's are available up to $3,000.

=== Heavily Impacted Communities ===
For much of the beginning of the pandemic, the Navajo nation had some of the highest rates of both COVID-19 cases and deaths in the country. As of May 2020, the Navajo had the highest positive test rate of 2,304 per 100,000, passing New York with a rate of 1,806 per 100,000. President Jonathan Nez of Navajo Nation stated that this increase was due to increased testing capacity as "More than 23,791 members, or 11% of the population of the Navajo Nation, has been tested for the virus." In a press release appealing to the Navajo community Nez said, "With every passing day, we are a day closer to beating COVID-19. Whether we realize it or not we are winning the war on this virus. We have to stay the course when it comes to staying home as much as possible, wearing masks in public, washing our hands often, and taking every precaution to ensure our health and safety especially for our elders and children." Navajo Nation has implemented a Stay-at-Home (Shelter in Place) Order and Daily Curfew from 10:00 pm to 5:00 am Effective Until Further Notice. As this order stays in place into April 2021, "The Navajo Department of Health on Monday loosened some virus-driven restrictions and transition to “yellow status.” Restaurants will be allowed to have in-door dining at 25% capacity and outdoor dining at 50% capacity. Parks will be permitted to open at 25% capacity but only for residents and employees. Navajo casinos will be able to open at 50% capacity, but only for residents and staff as well." By April 27th, Navajo Nation had seen its caseload drastically reduce, recording 5 new COVID-19 cases and 0 deaths.

== Government and private sector response ==
=== Tribal response ===
In 2020, the National Indian Health Board created a COVID-19 Tribal Resource Center to provide information to Native Americans, much of which was created by Native Americans. Information and resources on this site include videos, government reports, and websites created by Tohono O'odham Nation, the Hopi Tribe, Navajo Nation (including materials in the Navajo language), Pascua Yaqui Tribe, the American Indian Health Commission of Washington State, and tribes and tribal communities in New Mexico. Many committees have been holding emergency response committees to set up early in the pandemic to plan and prepare, for all potential needs of a pandemic and endure coordination across agencies. Tribes have also been doing rapid testing to help enlighten them on the virtual pandemic conditions and the fast spreading of the virus by providing quick and easy aid to positive COVID patients.

Many tribes and tribal communities provided COVID-19 statistics, preventative information, and healthcare and economic resources on their websites, including the following:

- Cherokee Nation
- Choctaw Nation
- Hopi Tribe
- Muscogee (Creek) Nation
- Navajo Nation
- Pascua Yaqui Tribe
- Tohono O'odham Nation
- Ojibwe Tribe

=== Government response ===
With the passage of the CARES Act in March 2020, $100 million in funding was secured on behalf of tribes in the Indian Community Development Block Grant. This grant "funds improvements to community facilities, infrastructure, and housing stock, and supports economic development in American Indian and Alaska Native communities." In August 2020, the Centers for Disease Control and Prevention (CDC) provided $200 million in COVID-19 funding to Indian Country "to support tribes and tribal organizations in carrying out COVID-19 preparedness and response activities, including surveillance, epidemiology, laboratory capacity, infection control, and mitigation". The CDC, National Indian Health Board, and the Indian Health Service (IHS) created websites and infographics to provide information specifically for Native American tribes and tribal communities. The IHS created a COVID-19 story map which tracks positive cases by IHS areas, including tribal and urban Indian facilities.

While many state governments collected data as to the races of those being afflicted with COVID-19, "as late as May nearly half of the states that collected these data omitted AI/NA peoples, instead lumping them into the “other” category." This action by dozens of state governments led to incomplete data during the early months of the pandemic as to the implications of COVID-19 on Native Americans and Alaska Natives.

=== Private sector response ===
In addition to government agencies, the Johns Hopkins Bloomberg School of Public Health's Center for American Indian Health also created resources to provide information on COVID-19 to Native American tribes and tribal communities. These include social media kits, radio scripts, and fact sheets on social distancing, vaccine safety, and testing.

The Navajo Nation, which is an Indian reservation, made up of American Indian Territory occupied by several different western states and occupy large land areas in the United States of America. The Navajo Nation members have a total of 29, 968 positive COVID-19 cases. The total number of deaths for this tribe is 1,222. The Navajo Nation has lost many tribe members' lives, so they plan to uphold a memorial to honor fallen tribe members through a virtual COVID-19 service event to help channel the one-year mark for the first official confirmed case in the tribe.

The Ojibwe Tribe, which is a member of an American Indian people who surround themselves by regions of the Great Lakes in the United States of America. In midsummer there was steady inflow of cases among members of the Leech Lake Band of Ojibwe. Members of this band saw significant increases in cases after confirmed group gatherings in recent weeks.

== Vaccine Rollout ==
The Indian Health Service announced in Early April that Indian Country had received more than 1 million doses of the COVID-19 vaccine. While many states initially struggled with vaccine rollout, tribal nations used call centers and existing methods of outreach to contact tribal members to receive the vaccine. The high rates of COVID-19 mortality among many Native American communities has also sped up the vaccine rollout due to what Navajo Nation President Jonathan Nez says was "just because of how hard hit the Navajo Nation was, we've seen a big increase in participation in taking the vaccine." As of April 26, Navajo Nation had reported vaccinating over half of its adult population with the COVID-19 vaccine, outpacing the current national rate of 42.2%. South Dakota's pandemic savaged Rosebud Sioux tribe has reported similar levels of success with vaccine distribution as "Out of the close to 5,000 doses they've received so far, only three have been wasted." This high prevalence of early vaccination was also reflected in a survey of college students at a Native American-Serving Nontribal Institution (NASNTI) in Colorado. According to Siobhan Wescott, MD, MPH who serves as co-director of the Indians into Medicine Program at the University of North Dakota School of Medicine & Health Sciences, "The Indian Health Service has absolutely been spectacular. They have led the nation, probably the world at this point. Well, Israel might be ahead of them, but it would be close. I believe it's the Blackfeet Nation has already reached herd immunity, with enough people vaccinated."

While there have been initial successes for Indian Country in terms of vaccinating the populations, many tribes still struggle to secure federal recognition for vaccines. Currently, 574 tribes are federally recognized while 245 are without federal recognition and access to the Indian Health Services. This forced tribes like the Chinook Indians in the American Northwest to "have relied on nearby tribes, including the Grande Ronde, to vaccinate their elders."

== See also ==
- COVID-19 pandemic in the Navajo Nation
- Native American disease and epidemics
- U.S. state and local government responses to the COVID-19 pandemic
