= Native American disease and epidemics =

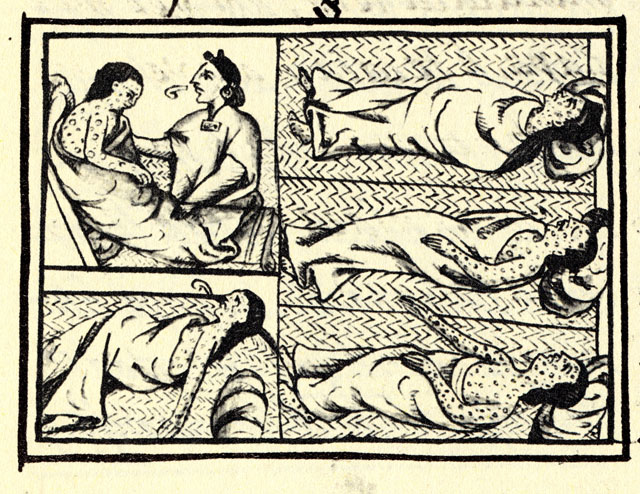
- Drawing in Book XII of the 16th-century Florentine Codex (compiled 1540–1585) of Nahua suffering from smallpox
- Disease: herpes, leptospirosis, hepatitis, smallpox, typhus, influenza, diphtheria, trichinosis, dysentery, syphilis, Cocoliztli epidemics, scarlet fever, bubonic plague, chickenpox, cholera, typhoid, pertussis, malaria, zika, yellow fever, Mumps, and measles
- Location: North and South America

The history of disease and epidemics that affected the Indigenous peoples of the Americas is defined by two distinct factors: localized endemic health conditions and foreign pathogens introduced through European colonization.

Prior to 1492, endemic conditions in the Americas included localized parasites, treponema infections, Chagas disease, and regional gastrointestinal disease, none of which produced continent-wide epidemics. In contrast, European contact and the subsequent colonization of the Americas introduced acute, highly contagious pathogens such as smallpox, measles, typhus, and influenza, against which Indigenous populations possessed no prior immunological exposure.

The Indigenous population of the Americas was estimated to be between 50 and 100 million prior to the arrival of Europeans, with one study estimating a population decline from 60 million down to 6 million by 1600.

== Background ==
The arrival and settlement of Europeans in the Americas resulted in what is known as the Columbian exchange. Europeans also took plants and goods back to the Old World. Potatoes and tomatoes from the Americas became integral to European and Asian cuisines, for instance.

But Europeans also unintentionally brought new infectious diseases. Most Old World diseases of known origin can be traced to Africa and Asia and were introduced to Europe over time. Smallpox originated in Africa or Asia, plague in Asia, cholera in Asia, influenza in Asia, malaria in Africa and Asia, measles from Asian rinderpest, tuberculosis in Asia, yellow fever in Africa, typhoid in Africa, herpes in Africa, zika in Africa, and mumps. A form of tuberculosis has also been identified in pre-Columbian South American populations, from bacterial genome sequences collected from human remains in Peru, and was probably transmitted to humans through seal hunting, but otherwise these Old-World diseases were transmitted to the Americas by European settlers, along with chickenpox, the common cold, diphtheria, scarlet fever, sexually transmitted diseases (with the possible exception of syphilis), typhus, and pertussis.

Each of these diseases resulted in sweeping epidemics among Native Americans, who sufered disability, illness, and a high mortality rate. The Europeans infected with such diseases typically carried them in a dormant state, were actively infected but asymptomatic, or had only mild symptoms, because Europe had been subject for centuries to a selective process by these diseases. The explorers and colonists often unknowingly passed the diseases to natives.

Although a variety of infectious diseases existed in the Americas in pre-Columbian times, the limited size of the populations, smaller number of domesticated animals with zoonotic diseases, and limited interactions between those populations (as compared to areas of Eurasia and Africa) hampered the transmission of communicable diseases.

One notable infectious disease that may be of American origin is syphilis, which originated in the Americas before 1492. However, a 2005 article entitled "History of Syphilis" states that this disease also originated from Africa. Another epidemic disease which is believed by modern-era experts to be indigenous was Cocoliztli, which is suspected to have been caused by climate change. Cocoliztli epidemics usually occurred within two years of a major drought. The epidemic in 1576 occurred after a drought stretching from Venezuela to Canada. Proponents of this epidemic's outbreak suggest the relationship between drought and outbreak which is reflected by the increased numbers of rodents carrying viral hemorrhagic fever during the rains that followed the drought. At least 12 epidemics are attributed to cocoliztli, with the largest occurring in 1545, 1576, 1736, and 1813. Soto et al. have hypothesized that a sizeable hemorrhagic fever outbreak could have contributed to the earlier collapse of the Classic Mayan civilization (AD 750–950). However, there are many theories that attempt to explain the decline of Mayan populations, none of them proven or taken as fact. Some experts believe other factors, such as over-use and eventual depletion of old-growth forests, and the loss of fertile soils caused by insufficiently conservative agricultural practices, played a larger role. The overall impact of those cultural practices on Mayan populations was exacerbated during naturally occurring, multiyear periods of drought that have been an oscillating feature of the local climate since long before the appearance of homo sapiens on the Yucatan peninsula.

The only disease which the Native Americans have historically shown high immunity against is scarlet fever.

== History of epidemics ==
Since there were numerous epidemics and all were not equally recorded, historical accounts of epidemics are often vague or contradictory in describing how victims were affected. A rash accompanied by a fever might be smallpox, measles, scarlet fever, or varicella, and many epidemics overlapped with multiple infections striking the same population at once. Therefore it is often impossible to know the exact causes of mortality (although ancient DNA studies can often determine the presence of certain microbes). Smallpox was the disease brought by Europeans that was most destructive to the Native Americans, both in terms of morbidity and mortality. The first well-documented smallpox epidemic in the Americas began in Hispaniola in late 1518 and soon spread to Mexico.

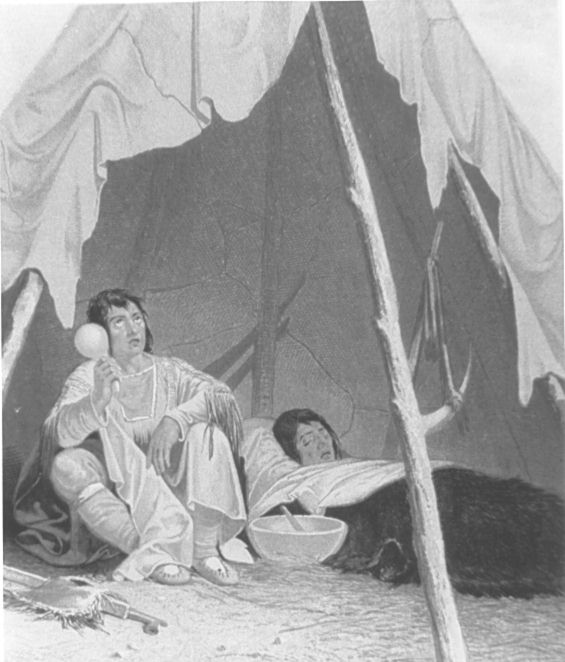
Nineteenth-century American artist's conception of a medicine man caring for a sick American Indian, from an 1857 book illustration.

In 1493, the first recorded influenza epidemic to strike the Americas occurred on the island of Hispaniola in the northern Spanish settlement of Isabela. The virus was introduced to the Isle of Santo Domingo by the Cristóbal Cólon, which docked at La Isabela on 10 December 1493, carrying about 2,000 Spanish passengers. Despite the general poor health of the colony, Columbus returned in 1494 and found that the Native American population had been affected by disease even more catastrophically than Isabela's first settlers were. By 1506, only a third of the native population remained.

Historians agree that when colonists settled for the very first time at Jamestown, it was one of the coldest periods for the previous thousand years, while the area of Roanoke suffered the largest drought of the past 800 years. The shortage of foods led the colonists to come into conflict with the indigenous population. Such conflicts and cold weather contributed much to the spread of diseases, as colder weather helped the parasite cells of malaria carried by those European settler hosts. This malaria spread into Native Americans, causing many deaths among them.

The introduction of African slaves and the use of commercial trade routes also contributed to the spread of disease. Waves of enslaved Africans were brought to replace the dwindling Indigenous populations, solidifying the position of disease in triangular trade.

== Reactions of the Native Americans ==
Native Americans initially believed that illness primarily resulted from being out of balance, in relation to their spirituality. Theoretically, Native Americans held that disease was caused by an entity of evil or brought upon the body by means of sorcery, or the result of lack of cultural practices or worship. Given the immediate introduction of new diseases by colonizers, indigenous peoples related the illnesses to being unprotected by spirits, or as a result of malign human or supernatural intervention. Cherokee spiritual beliefs attribute disease to revenge imposed by animals for killing them. The Mapuche in Araucanía regarded the epidemic as a magic brought by Francisco de Villagra to exterminate them because he could not defeat them in the Arauco War.

In some cases, disease was seen as a punishment for disregarding tribal traditions or disobeying tribal rituals. Spiritual powers were called on to cure diseases through the practice of shamanism. Most Native American tribes also used a wide variety of medicinal plants and other substances in the treatment of disease.

=== Forced settlements and disease spread ===
In Florida, Spanish settlers forced indigenous groups into concentration camps. Since the early 16th century, the native people of this land were exposed to new diseases brought by Europeans, including smallpox, measles and typhus. This was not involuntary relocation, it was imprisonment and a European genocide along side a hostile takeover of agriculture and deliberate confinement in ideal conditions for the spread of infectious diseases, successfully and catastrophically eradicating the population.

The Trail of Tears was the forced imprisonment of Native American tribes in the 1830s from Eastern Woodlands to the west of the Mississippi River. This genocidal act was ordered by the government and primarily targeted "the Cherokee, Choctaw, Chickasaw, Creek, and Seminole" nations Approximately 100,000 native Americans were removed from their families and 15,000 died during the removal and journey west. The journey west consisted of 5,045 miles across nine states. Many people lost their lives on this rigorous forced journey. Cholera was one of the causes of mortality Native Americans during the Trail of Tears. Traveling by steamboat was a common way to travel and cholera was present in the waterways used by the steamboats. It is estimated that 5,000 Native Americans died of cholera on this journey to areas west of the Mississippi.

== Effects ==
=== On population ===
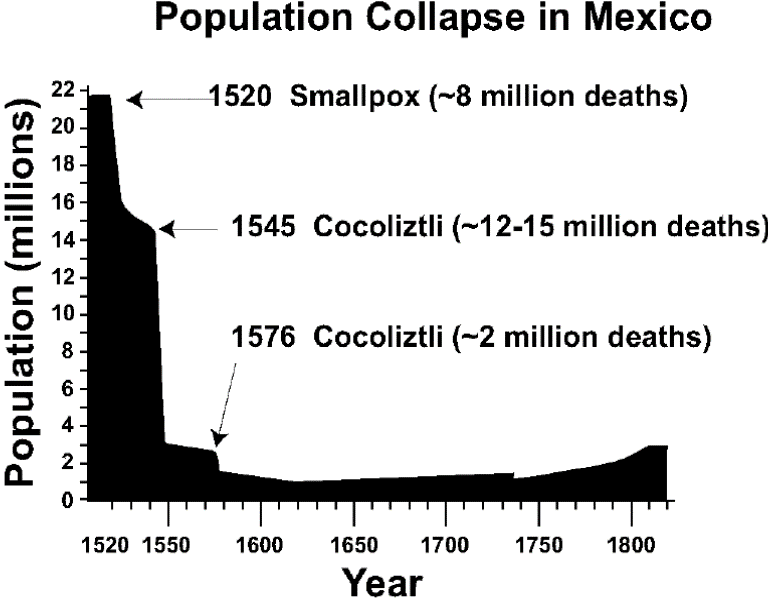
Graph of population decline in central Mexico caused by successive epidemics

Many Native American tribes suffered high mortality and depopulation, averaging 25–50% of the tribes' members dead from disease. Additionally, some smaller tribes were threatened with extinction after facing a severely destructive spread of disease.

Epidemics of smallpox (1518, 1521, 1525, 1558, 1589), typhus (1546), influenza (1558), diphtheria (1614) and measles (1618) swept the Americas subsequent to European contact, killing between 10 million and 100 million people, up to 95% of the indigenous population of the Americas. Estimates of mortality range from one-quarter to one-half of the population of central Mexico.

An early example followed Hernán Cortés' invasion of Mexico. Before his arrival in 1519, the Mexican population is estimated to have been around 25 to 30 million. Fifty years later, the Mexican population was reduced to 3 million and perhaps even 1.2 million in 1620, mainly by infectious disease. A 2018 study by Koch, Brierley, Maslin and Lewis concluded that an estimated "55 million indigenous people died following the European conquest of the Americas beginning in 1492." Estimates for the entire number of human lives lost during the Cocoliztli epidemics in New Spain have ranged from 5 to 15 million people, making it one of the most deadly disease outbreaks of all time. By 1700, fewer than 5,000 Native Americans remained in the southeastern coastal region of the United States. Even after the two largest empires of the America continent, the Inca and the Aztecs, were devastated by the virus, smallpox continued to spread further; in 1561, the epidemic reached Chile by sea, when a ship carrying the new governor Francisco de Villagra landed at La Serena. Chile had previously been isolated by the Atacama Desert and Andes Mountains from Peru, but at the end of 1561 and in early 1562, smallpox ravaged the Chilean natives. Modern estimates put the proportion of Chilean natives lost at 20-25 percent. The Spanish historian Marmolejo said that gold mines had to shut down when all their native laborers died.

During the Inca Civil War, it was estimated that the smallpox which transmitted by the Spaniard under Francisco Pizarro killed at least 200,000.

In Florida alone, an estimated 700,000 Native Americans lived there in 1520, but by 1700, the number decreased to only around 2,000 people.

Another notable example was the incident of the so-called The Great Dying in New England around the years of 1616-1619, where the epidemics which carried by European settlers including trichinosis, chickenpox, Influenza, HBD/HDV, Typhus, smallpox, plague, and leptospirosis, resulted in a catastrophic demographic collapse which has been estimated to be up to 95% of the total casualties of the indigenous population. The Pennacook, an Algonquian confederation in present-day New Hampshire, eastern Massachusetts, and southern Maine (including subgroups like the Naumkeag, Agawam, Wamesit, Nashua, and Souhegan) were also afflicted by this so-called "Great Dying", which is suspected to have been leptospirosis from European contact that spread along the Merrimack River. The coastal subgroups (the Naumkeag and Agawam) faced 80–90% mortality, their populations falling from 1,000–2,000 to ~100–200 and 500–1,500 to ~50–150, respectively. Inland subgroups like Wamesit and Nashua saw 50–75% losses, reducing the confederation from 10,000–20,000 to under 2,000 by 1619. The disaster disrupted Pennacook society, leaving villages deserted and easing later English colonization. Archaeological evidence shows mass graves and abandoned sites. During this period, outbreaks of diphtheria, dysentery and measles were also reported to have broken out within unspecified tribal groups of native Americans.

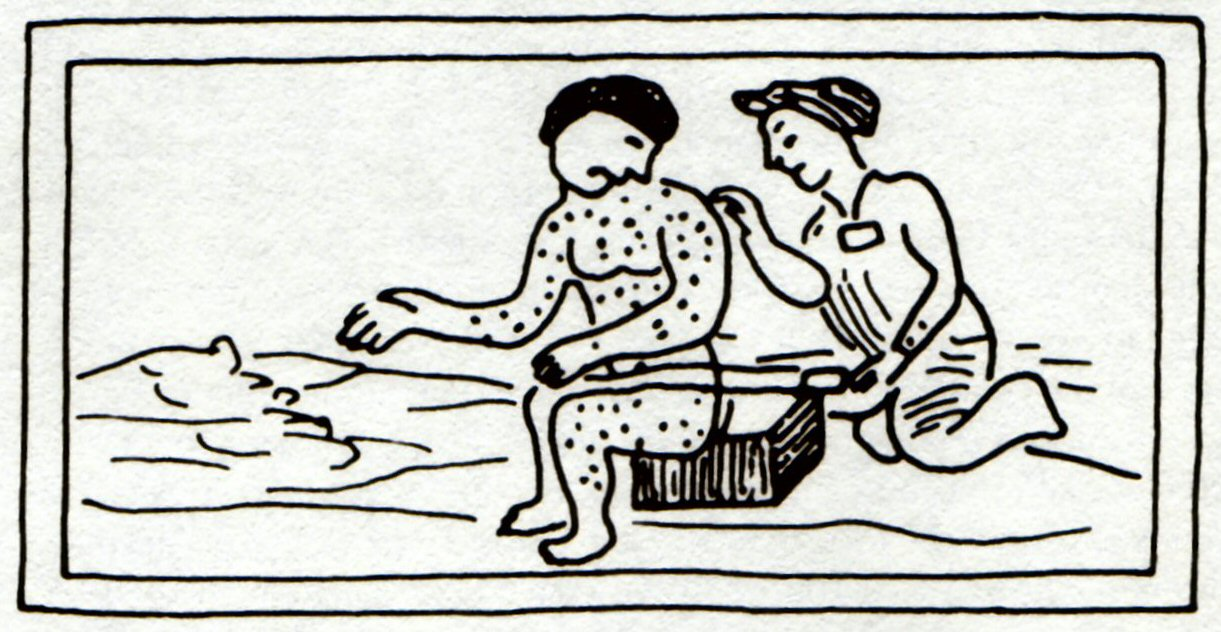
Drawing of Aztec people suffering from measles epidemic

The population of Mohawk people was also hit by smallpox epidemics around 1630s, causing their population to decrease by 63%, from 7,740 to 2,830. At some point by 1633, smallpox infected the entire tribe and left the Mohawks unable to care for each other or bury their dead.

In summer 1639, a smallpox epidemic struck the Huron natives in the St. Lawrence and Great Lakes regions. The disease had reached the Huron tribes through French colonial traders from Québec who remained in the region throughout the winter. When the epidemic was over, the Huron population had been reduced to roughly 9,000 people, about half of what it had been before 1634. The Iroquois people, generally south of the Great Lakes, faced similar losses after encounters with French, Dutch and English colonists.

During the 1770s, smallpox killed at least 30% (tens of thousands) of the Northwestern Native Americans.

The smallpox epidemic of 1780–1782 brought devastation and drastic depopulation among the Plains Indians, as the natives in the area contracted the disease from the 'Snake Indians' on the Mississippi. From there it spread eastward and northward to the Saskatchewan River. Its first case was found among the fur traders in October 15, 1781. A week later, reports were made to William Walker and William Tomison, who were in charge of the Hudson and Cumberland Hudson's Bay Company posts. By February, the disease spread as far as the Basquia Tribe. After reading Tomison's journals, Houston and Houston calculated that, of the Indians who traded at the Hudson and Cumberland houses, 95% died of smallpox. Paul Hackett adds to the mortality numbers suggesting that perhaps up to one-half to three-quarters of the Ojibway situated west of the Grand Portage died from the disease. The Cree also suffered a casualty rate of approximately 75% with similar effects found in the Lowland Cree.

By 1832, the federal government of the United States established a smallpox vaccination program for Native Americans. The Commissioner of Indian Affairs in 1839 reported on the casualties of the 1837 Great Plains smallpox epidemic: "No attempt has been made to count the victims, nor is it possible to reckon them in any of these tribes with accuracy; it is believed that if [the number 17,200 for the upper Missouri River Indians] was doubled, the aggregate would not be too large for those who have fallen east of the Rocky Mountains."

=== Impact on environment and society ===
Some 21st-century climate scientists have suggested that a severe reduction of the indigenous population in the Americas and the accompanying reduction in cultivated lands during the 16th, 17th and 18th centuries may have contributed to a global cooling event known as the Little Ice Age.

The loss of population was so high that it was partially responsible for the myth of the Americas as "virgin wilderness". By the time significant European colonization was underway, native populations had already been reduced by 90%. This resulted in settlements vanishing and cultivated fields being abandoned. Since forests were recovering, the colonists had an impression of a land that was an untamed wilderness.

The "virgin soil effect" encompasses the severe psychological effects on Native American societies in the aftermath of population-decimation by disease, which added to the social disruption caused by infectious diseases themselves.

Disease had both direct and indirect effects on deaths. High mortality meant that there were fewer people to plant crops, hunt game, and otherwise support the group. Loss of cultural knowledge transfer also affected the community as vital agricultural and food-gathering skills were not passed on to survivors. Missing the right time to hunt or plant crops affected the food supply, thus further weakening the community and making it more vulnerable to the next epidemic. Communities under such crisis were often unable to care for people who were disabled, elderly, or young.

The material and societal realities of disability for Native American communities were tangible. Scarlet fever could result in blindness or deafness, and sometimes both. Smallpox epidemics led to blindness and depigmented scars. Many Native American tribes took pride in their own appearance, and the resulting skin disfigurement of smallpox deeply affected them psychologically. Unable to cope with this condition, tribe members were said to have committed suicide.

== Biological weapon theory ==
Historian David Stannard asserts that by "focusing almost entirely on disease ... contemporary authors increasingly have created the impression that the eradication of those tens of millions of people was inadvertent—a sad, but both inevitable and 'unintended consequence' of human migration and progress." He says that their destruction "was neither inadvertent nor inevitable", but the result of microbial pestilence and purposeful genocide working in tandem. Historian Andrés Reséndez says that evidence suggests "among these human factors, slavery has emerged as a major killer" of the indigenous populations of the Caribbean between 1492 and 1550, rather than diseases such as smallpox, influenza and malaria. The second European explanation was a perceived divine approval, in which God removed the Indigenous peoples as part of His "divine plan" to make way for a new Christian civilization. In following centuries, accusations and discussions of biological warfare were common. Well-documented accounts of incidents involving both threats and acts of deliberate infection are very rare.

Fur trader James McDougall was quoted as threatening some local chiefs that he would use his water bottle infected with smallpox if they did not comply with his demands. Another fur trader threatened Pawnee Indians that, if they did not agree to certain conditions, he would use a bottle containing smallpox against their people. The Reverend Isaac McCoy was quoted in his History of Baptist Indian Missions as saying that the settlers deliberately spread smallpox among the natives of the southwest, including the Pawnee tribe, which devastating result was reported to General Clark and the Secretary of War. Artist and writer George Catlin observed that Native Americans were also suspicious of vaccination. The Mandan chief Four Bears even denounced some settlers whom he had previously treated as his own kin, under the accusation of deliberately bringing the disease to his people.

== Smallpox ==
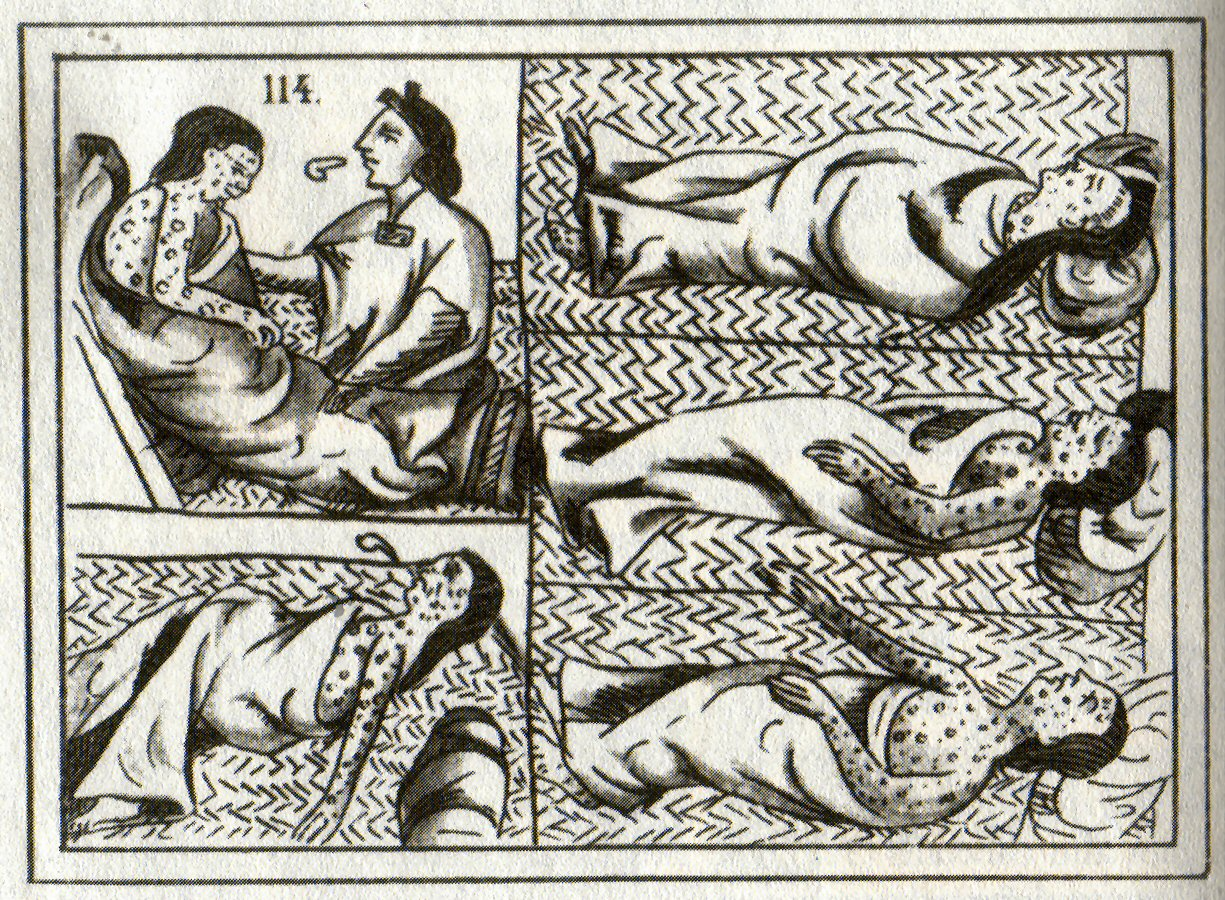
Sixteenth-century Aztec drawings of victims of smallpox (above) and measles (below)

A single soldier arriving in Mexico in 1520 was carrying smallpox and initiated the devastating plagues that swept through the native populations of the Americas.

According to one source introduction of smallpox among the Aztecs has been attributed to an African slave named Francisco Eguía. However, this has been disputed by the record that from May to September, smallpox already spread slowly to Tepeaca and Tlaxcala, and to Tenochtitlán by the fall of 1520. At this time, Cortes was returning to conquer the city after his previous defeat in the battle of Noche Triste.

After its introduction to Mexico, the disease spread across South America, devastating indigenous populations in what are now Colombia, Peru and Chile during the sixteenth century. The disease was slow to spread northward due to the sparse population of the northern Mexico desert region. It was introduced to eastern North America separately by colonists arriving in 1633 to Plymouth, Massachusetts, and local Native American communities were soon struck by the virus. It reached the Mohawk nation in 1634, the Lake Ontario area in 1636, and the lands of other Iroquois tribes by 1679. Between 1613 and 1690 the Iroquois tribes living in Quebec suffered twenty-four epidemics, almost all of them caused by smallpox. By 1698 the virus had crossed the Mississippi, causing an epidemic that nearly obliterated the Quapaw Indians of Arkansas.

By the mid-eighteenth century the disease was affecting populations severely enough to interrupt trade and negotiations. Thomas Hutchins, in his August 1762 journal entry while at Ohio's Fort Miami, named for the Mineamie people, wrote:

The 20th, The above Indians met, and the Ouiatanon Chief spoke in behalf of his and the Kickaupoo Nations as follows: "Brother, We are very thankful to Sir William Johnson for sending you to enquire into the State of the Indians. We assure you we are Rendered very miserable at Present on Account of a Severe Sickness that has seiz'd almost all our People, many of which have died lately, and many more likely to Die..." The 30th, Set out for the Lower Shawneese Town and arriv'd 8th of September in the afternoon. I could not have a meeting with the Shawneese the 12th, as their People were Sick and Dying every day.

On June 24, 1763, during the siege of Fort Pitt, as recorded in his journal by fur trader and militia captain William Trent, dignitaries from the Delaware tribe met with British officials at the fort, warned them of "great numbers of Indians" coming to attack the fort, and pleaded with them to leave the fort while there was still time. The commander of the fort, Simeon Ecuyear, refused to abandon the fort. Instead, Ecuyear gave as gifts two blankets, one silk handkerchief and one piece of linen that were believed to have been in contact with smallpox-infected individuals, to the two Delaware emissaries Turtleheart and Mamaltee, allegedly in the hope of spreading the deadly disease to nearby tribes, as attested in Trent's journal. The dignitaries were met again later and they seemingly hadn't contracted smallpox. A relatively small outbreak of smallpox had begun spreading earlier that spring, with a hundred dying from it among Native American tribes in the Ohio Valley and Great Lakes area through 1763 and 1764. The effectiveness of the biological warfare itself remains unknown, and the method used is inefficient compared to airborne transmission.

21st-century scientists such as V. Barras and G. Greub have examined such reports. They say that smallpox is spread by respiratory droplets in personal interaction, not by contact with fomites, such objects as were described by Trent. The results of such attempts to spread the disease through objects are difficult to differentiate from naturally occurring epidemics.

Gershom Hicks, who was held captive by the Ohio Country Shawnee and Delaware between May 1763 and April 1764, reported to Captain William Grant of the 42nd Regiment that the smallpox has killed 30 or 40 Mingoes, and approximately similar with the Delawares and Shawneese.

=== 19th century ===
In 1832 President Andrew Jackson signed Congressional authorization and funding to set up a smallpox vaccination program for Indian tribes. The goal was to eliminate the deadly threat of smallpox to a population with little or no immunity, and at the same time exhibit the benefits of cooperation with the government. In practice there were severe obstacles. The tribal medicine men launched a strong opposition, warning of white trickery and offering an alternative explanation and system of cure. Some taught that the affliction could best be cured by a sweat bath followed by a rapid plunge into cold water. Furthermore the vaccines often lost their potency when transported and stored over long distances with primitive storage facilities. It was too little and too late to avoid the great smallpox epidemic of 1837 to 1840 that swept across North America west of the Mississippi, all the way to Canada and Alaska. Deaths have been estimated in the range of 100,000 to 300,000, with entire tribes wiped out. Over 90 percent of the Mandans died.

In the mid to late nineteenth century, at a time of increasing European-American travel and settlement in the West, at least four different epidemics broke out among the Plains Indians tribes from 1837 to 1870. The Indians traded with the white people regardless spread disease to their villages. In the late 19th century, the Lakota Indians of the Plains called the disease the "rotting face sickness".

The 1862 Pacific Northwest smallpox epidemic, which was brought from San Francisco to Victoria, devastated the indigenous peoples of the Pacific Northwest Coast, with a death rate of over 50% for the entire coast from Puget Sound to Southeast Alaska. In some areas the native population fell by as much as 90%. Some historians have described the epidemic as a deliberate genocide because the Colony of Vancouver Island and the Colony of British Columbia could have prevented the epidemic but chose not to, and in some ways facilitated it.

== See also ==
- Little Ice Age
- New World syndrome
- Alcohol and Native Americans
- Native American health
- Environmental racism
- Impact of Old World diseases on the Maya
- History of smallpox in Mexico
- Cocoliztli epidemics
- 1918 Spanish flu pandemic
- COVID-19 pandemic in the Navajo Nation
- Impact of the COVID-19 pandemic on Native American tribes and tribal communities

General:

- Native Americans in the United States
- Population history of indigenous peoples of the Americas
- List of epidemics and pandemics
- Globalization and disease
- Societal collapse
- Health of Native Americans in the United States
