= Malaria in the Caribbean =

Malaria outbreaks in the Caribbean

Malaria has had a significant impact on the history of the Caribbean, due to its effects on the colonization of the islands and the corresponding impact on society and economy.

Malaria was not found in the Americas prior to the discovery of the New World by Europeans. There was therefore even less immunity among the native populations than there was among Europeans. Due to their genetics, African slaves had greater immunity to falciparum malaria, and this was one reason why slaves were brought in great numbers from Africa.

Creoles felt that diseases such as malaria were tools preventing their territories being invaded by Europeans.

The Caribbean countries most affected by malaria were the Greater Antilles islands and other humid islands like Martinique and Trinidad and Tobago. Anopheles mosquitoes thrive mostly in areas of humidity and fresh water, so the disease was not found on islands such as the Bahamas and Antigua.

As of 2019, several cases of malaria occur each year in Trinidad and Tobago.

== See also ==
- Influx of disease in the Caribbean
