= Contested Continent =

Contested Continent: The Struggle for North America, c. 1000–1680
- First edition cover
- Author: Peter C. Mancall
- Language: English
- Series: Oxford History of the United States
- Subject: Colonial history of the United States, European colonization of the Americas
- Genre: Non-fiction, history
- Publisher: Oxford University Press, Blackstone Audio
- Publication date: June 1, 2026
- Publication place: United States
- Media type: Print (hardcover), e-book, audiobook
- Pages: 752 pp.
- Website: Oxford University Press

Contested Continent: The Struggle for North America, c. 1000–1680 is a history of early North America and the European colonization of the Americas from the arrival of Norse explorers to the late seventeenth century. It was written by Peter C. Mancall and published by Oxford University Press in June 2026, in hardback and e-book editions. Blackstone published an unabridged audiobook on October 2026. It is the first volume of the Oxford History of the United States. (Note: Chronologically it is the first volume, however other volumes covering later periods have been previously published; it the tenth volume in the sereies to be published.)

== Synopsis ==
The book examines the early history of North America from 1000 CE to 1680, He dispels the misconception that Europeans arrived in an empty wilderness: the continent was home to over 50 million people living in established towns and connected by trade networks.

The book is divided into three sections:

- Part 1 "Discoveries" covers the initial European expeditions
- Part 2 "Colonies" covers the growth of permanent settlements
- Part 3: "Fractures" covers the warfare and fighting that marked the end of the era.

Mancall describees how different nations approached colonization differently. The work tracks three major developments:

- The rise of a global economy based on American resources
- The displacement of Indigenous peoples alongside the enslavement of Africans
- The growth of self-governing colonies.

The history concludes around 1680, a period marked by major uprisings across the continent. This marks a turning point where Europeans began moving into the interior in large numbers.

== Reviews ==
- Contested continent Review of the book Contested continent: The struggle for North America, c. 1000–1680, by P. C. Mancall. (2026, May 15). Kirkus Reviews.
- Kidd, T. S. (2026, June 19). Faith and friction before the revolution Review of the books Contested continent: The struggle for North America, c. 1000–1680, by P. C. Mancall; Religion in the lands that became America: A new history, by T. A. Tweed; and The barbarous years: The peopling of British North America: The conflict of civilizations, 1600–1675, by B. Bailyn. Christianity Today.
- Farrell, J. A. (2026, August 21). Contested continent: The struggle for North America, c. 1000-1680 Review of the book Contested continent: The struggle for North America, c. 1000–1680, by P. C. Mancall. Washington Independent Review of Books.
- Staloff, D. (2026, September 25). The conquest of North America Review of the book Contested continent: The struggle for North America, c. 1000–1680, by P. C. Mancall. Civitas Outlook.
- Cozzens, P. (n.d.). 'Contested continent' review: Strategies for the new world Review of the book Contested continent: The struggle for North America, c. 1000–1680, by P. C. Mancall. The Wall Street Journal.

== Release information ==
- First edition: Mancall, P. C. (2026). Contested continent: The struggle for North America, c. 1000–1680 (Hardcover ed.). Oxford University Press.

== About the author ==
Peter Mancall (b. June 18, 1959) is a professor of history at the University of Southern California; his work has focused on Colonial history of the United States, Native Americans, and the early modern Atlantic World.

== Similar or related works ==
- Bailyn, B. (2012). The barbarous years: The peopling of British North America: The conflict of civilizations, 1600–1675. Alfred A. Knopf.
- Mann, C. C. (2005). 1491: New revelations of the Americas before Columbus. Alfred A. Knopf.
- Mann, C. C. (2011). 1493: Uncovering the new world Columbus created. Alfred A. Knopf.
- Taylor, A. (2001). American colonies: The settling of North America. Viking.
- Weber, D. J. (1992). The Spanish frontier in North America. Yale University Press.
- Weidensaul, S. (2012). The first frontier: The forgotten history of struggle, savagery, and endurance in early America. Houghton Mifflin Harcourt.

== Series information ==
The Oxford History of the United States is an ongoing multivolume narrative history of the United States published by Oxford University Press. Launched in 1961 under the co-editorship of historians Richard Hofstadter and C. Vann Woodward, the series has been edited by David M. Kennedy since 1999.

== See also ==
- Colonial history of the United States
- European colonization of the Americas
- Population history of the Indigenous peoples of the Americas
