= 1493: Uncovering the New World Columbus Created =

2011 nonfiction book by Charles C. Mann

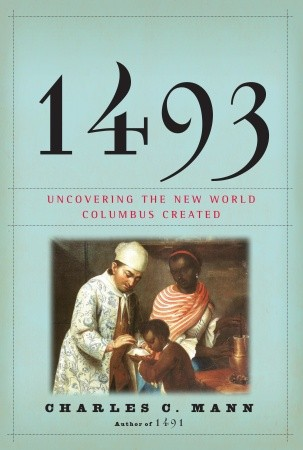
- Author: Charles C. Mann
- Language: English
- Subject: World History; Columbian Exchange
- Genre: Nonfiction; History
- Publisher: Knopf
- Publication date: 9 August 2011
- Publication place: United States
- Media type: Print (hardcover)
- Pages: 560
- ISBN: 978-0-307-26572-2
- OCLC: 682893439
- Dewey Decimal: 909/.4
- LC Class: D228 .M36 2011
- Preceded by: 1491: New Revelations of the Americas Before Columbus

1493: Uncovering the New World Columbus Created is a nonfiction book by Charles C. Mann first published in 2011. It covers the global effects of the Columbian Exchange, following Columbus's first landing in the Americas, that led to our current globalized world civilization. It follows on from Mann's previous book on the Americas prior to Columbus, 1491: New Revelations of the Americas Before Columbus.

In his book, Mann argues that Columbus paved the way to the homogenocene, a particular feature of the anthropocene that is marked by a global homogenization of (agricultural) species, diseases, and tools brought about by the migration and transport that set in with the discovery of the new world. Modern global food production largely relies on “invasive species” (crops, livestock) that existed only regionally before the establishment of the new trade and transport paths.

== Different titles ==
In the United Kingdom, the book is published by Granta Books and is titled 1493: How the Ecological Collision of Europe and the Americas Gave Rise to the Modern World.

The book was adapted for younger readers by Rebecca Stefoff and published by Seven Stories Press in 2015 as 1493 for Young People: From Columbus's Voyage to Globalization.

== Synopsis ==
The author describes the Columbian Exchange and its global impact. Monocultures such as tobacco caused soil erosion and flooding. Colonization also brought the infectious diseases of malaria and yellow fever that he says did not exist on the American continent. Potatoes and tobacco were exchanged for silver in China. Guano from the Andes was used as a fertilizer in Europe. The author ends by describing how the triangular trade in African slaves impacted the world in its culture, food, agriculture, and history. The slaves who managed to escape formed isolated communities, sometimes forging alliances with Indigenous peoples and other marginalized groups.

== Reception ==
Ian Morris, in his review in The New York Times, appreciates the interesting tales Mann tells, writing, "He makes even the most unpromising-sounding subjects fascinating. I, for one, will never look at a piece of rubber in quite the same way now that I have been introduced to the debauched nouveaux riches of 19th-century Brazil, guzzling Champagne from bathtubs and gunning one another down in the streets of Manaus." Gregory McNamee in The Washington Post finds 1493 "fascinating and complex, exemplary in its union of meaningful fact with good storytelling."

== See also ==
- 1491: New Revelations of the Americas Before Columbus
- American Holocaust
- Indian Givers: How the Indians of the Americas Transformed the World
- Mancall, P. C. (2026). Contested Continent: The Struggle for North America, c. 1000–1680 (Hardcover ed.). Oxford University Press.
