= Bibliography of genocide studies =

This is a select annotated bibliography of scholarly English language books (including translations) and journal articles about the subject of genocide studies; for bibliographies of genocidal acts or events, please see the See also section for individual articles.

Works listed here are cited in the notes or bibliographies of scholarly sources. Each is published by an academic or major press, written by a recognized expert, or substantially reviewed in scholarly journals; borderline cases are omitted. A selection of primary sources are included. Many of the books below carry their own bibliographies; see the Further reading section for other bibliographies, and the External links section for historical sites, academic sites, and museums.

Citations follow APA style. (Note: Entries are in plain text APA 7 format without templates; templates are used only for reviews and notes.) Book have citations to academic journal or mainstream published reviews when available. For books only partly about the subject, relevant chapter or section titles are provided when useful and available. Translators of the original-language edition are included when possible. In cases where a title or name has appeared with more than one English spelling, the most recent published form is used and a footnote documents any earlier title under which the work appeared.

== General surveys ==
- Davidson, Lawrence (2012). Cultural Genocide. Rutgers University Press. ISBN 978-0-8135-5243-9. JSTOR j.ctt5hj5jx.
- Jones, Adam. (2016). Genocide: A Comprehensive Introduction (3rd ed.). Routledge.
- Shelton D. (2005). Encyclopedia of Genocide and Crimes Against Humanity. Thomson Gale.
- Totten, Samuel. Bartrop, Paul R, Jacobs, Steven L. (2008). Dictionary of Genocide. Westport, CN: Greenwood Press. ISBN 978-0-313-34641-5
- Üngör, U. Ü. (Ed.). (2016). Genocide. Amsterdam University Press.

== Topical works ==
- Abed, Mohammed (2015). "The Concept of Genocide Reconsidered". Social Theory and Practice. 41 (2): 328–356. doi:10.5840/soctheorpract201541218. ISSN 0037-802X. JSTOR 24332284.
- Akesson, Bree & Basso, Andrew R. (2022). From Bureaucracy to Bullets: Extreme Domicide and the Right to Home. Rutgers University Press. doi:10.2307/j.ctv2v55m4g. ISBN 978-1-9788-0272-8. JSTOR j.ctv2v55m4g. S2CID 251687537.
- Anstett, Élisabeth & Dreyfus, Jean-Marc, eds. (2014). Destruction and Human Remains: Disposal and Concealment in Genocide and Mass Violence. Manchester University Press. ISBN 978-0-7190-9602-0. JSTOR j.ctt1wn0s3n.
- Bachman, J. (2019). The United States and Genocide. Routledge.
- Bachman, J. (Ed.). (2019). Cultural Genocide: Law, Politics, and Global Manifestations. Routledge.
- Bachman, Jeffrey S. (2022). The Politics of Genocide: From the Genocide Convention to the Responsibility to Protect. Rutgers University Press. doi:10.2307/j.ctv2x4kq0k. ISBN 978-1-9788-2146-0. JSTOR j.ctv2x4kq0k. S2CID 252523332.
- Bemporad, Elissa & Warren, Joyce W., eds. (2018). Women and Genocide: Survivors, Victims, Perpetrators. Indiana University Press. doi:10.2307/j.ctvgd2jm. ISBN 978-0-253-03383-3. JSTOR j.ctvgd2jm.
- Benesch, Susan (2004). "Inciting Genocide, Pleading Free Speech". World Policy Journal. 21 (2): 62–69. doi:10.1215/07402775-2004-3001. ISSN 0740-2775. JSTOR 40209919.
- Benvenuto, Jeff & Woolford, Andrew (2015). "Canada and Colonial Genocide". Journal of Genocide Research. 17 (4): 373–390. doi:10.1080/14623528.2015.1096580. ISSN 1462-3528.
- Brantlinger, P. (2003). Dark Vanishings: Discourse on the Extinction of Primitive Races, 1800–1930 (1st ed.). Cornell University Press.
- Campbell, Bradley (2009). "Genocide as Social Control". Sociological Theory. 27 (2): 150–172. doi:10.1111/j.1467-9558.2009.01341.x. ISSN 0735-2751. JSTOR 40376129. S2CID 143902886.
- Campbell, B. (2015). The Geometry of Genocide: A Study in Pure Sociology. University of Virginia Press.
- Card, Claudia (2003). "Genocide and Social Death". Hypatia. 18 (1): 63–79. doi:10.1111/j.1527-2001.2003.tb00779.x. ISSN 0887-5367. JSTOR 3811037. S2CID 143915632.
- Clarke, A. W. (2012). Rendition to Torture. Rutgers University Press.
- Daar, Judith (2017). The New Eugenics: Selective Breeding in an Era of Reproductive Technologies. Yale University Press. ISBN 978-0-300-13715-6. JSTOR j.ctt1kgqwrv.
- Der Matossian, Bedross (2023), ed. Denial of Genocides in the Twenty-First Century Lincoln: University of Nebraska Press. ISBN 978-1-4962-2510-8
- Feierstein, D., & Town, D.A. (2014). Defining the Concept of Genocide. In Genocide as Social Practice: Reorganizing Society under the Nazis and Argentina's Military Juntas (pp. 11–38). Rutgers University Press.
- Freeman, Michael (1995). "Genocide, Civilization and Modernity". The British Journal of Sociology. 46 (2): 207–223. doi:10.2307/591786. ISSN 0007-1315. JSTOR 591786.
- Ginzberg, Eitan (2020) "Genocide and the Hispanic-American Dilemma," Genocide Studies and Prevention: An International Journal: Vol. 14: Iss. 2: 122–152. [doi:10.5038/1911-9933.14.2.1666 Available at: Genocide and the Hispanic-American Dilemma
- Gobodo-Madikizela, Pumla, ed. (2016). Breaking Intergenerational Cycles of Repetition: A Global Dialogue on Historical Trauma and Memory (1st ed.). Verlag Barbara Budrich. doi:10.2307/j.ctvdf03jc. ISBN 978-3-8474-0240-4. JSTOR j.ctvdf03jc.
- Hennebel, Ludovic, and Thomas Hochmann (eds), Genocide Denials and the Law (2011), doi:10.1093/acprof:oso/9780199738922.001.0001
- Hiebert, M. S. (2019). Constructing Genocide and Mass Violence: Society, Crisis, Identity. Routledge.
- Hinton, P.A.L. (Ed.). (2011). Transitional Justice: Global Mechanisms and Local Realities after Genocide and Mass Violence. Rutgers University Press.
- Hitchcock, R. (Ed.). (2011). Genocide of Indigenous Peoples: A Critical Bibliographic Review (1st ed.). Routledge.
- Horowitz, Irving Louis. (1980). Taking Lives: Genocide and State Power. New Brunswick, NJ: Transaction Books.
- Hu, Alice C. (2016). "'Genocide' Taboo Why We're Afraid of the G-Word". Harvard International Review. 37 (4): 4–6. ISSN 0739-1854. JSTOR 26445607.
- Kuper, Leo (1991). "When Denial Becomes Routine." Social Education 55(2):121–123.
- Karazsia, Zachary A. (2018). "An Unfulfilled Promise: The Genocide Convention and the Obligation of Prevention". Journal of Strategic Security. 11 (4): 20–31. doi:10.5038/1944-0472.11.4.1676. ISSN 1944-0464. JSTOR 26627191. S2CID 150577632.
- Kiernan, Ben. (2007). Blood and soil: A world history of genocide and extermination from Sparta to Darfur. Yale University Press. ISBN 978-0-300-14425-3.
- van Krieken, Robert (2004). "Rethinking Cultural Genocide: Aboriginal Child Removal and Settler-Colonial State Formation". Oceania. 75 (2): 125–151. doi:10.1002/j.1834-4461.2004.tb02873.x. ISSN 0029-8077. JSTOR 40331967.
- Kühne, T. (2010). Belonging and Genocide. Yale University Press.
- Mako, Shamiran (2012). "Cultural Genocide and Key International Instruments: Framing the Indigenous Experience". International Journal on Minority and Group Rights. 19 (2): 175–194. doi:10.1163/157181112X639078. ISSN 1385-4879. JSTOR 24675651.
- Mayersen, D. (Ed.). (2016). The United Nations and Genocide. Palgrave Macmillan.
- Mcdonnell, Michael A. & Moses, A. Dirk (2005) "Raphael Lemkin as historian of genocide in the Americas", Journal of Genocide Research, 7:4, 501–529, doi:10.1080/14623520500349951
- Melson, Robert (1996). "Paradigms of Genocide: The Holocaust, the Armenian Genocide, and Contemporary Mass Destructions". The Annals of the American Academy of Political and Social Science. 548: 156–168. doi:10.1177/0002716296548001012. ISSN 0002-7162. JSTOR 1048550. S2CID 144586524.
- Monroe, Kristen Renwick (2012). Ethics in an Age of Terror and Genocide: Identity and Moral Choice. Princeton University Press. ISBN 978-0-691-15143-4. JSTOR j.ctt7rtff.
- Moses, Dirk A. (2010). Genocide : Critical Concepts in Historical Studies. Abingdon: Routledge. ISBN 978-0-415-49375-8. OCLC 729828543.
- Moses, A. Dirk (Ed.). (2008). Empire, Colony, Genocide: Conquest, Occupation, and Subaltern Resistance in World History. Berghahn Books.
- Moses, A. Dirk, Joeden-Forgey, E. von, Feierstein, D., Frieze, D.-L., Nunpa, M., Richmond, W., Jones, A., Hinton, P.A.L., Travis, H., & Hegburg, K. (2013). Hidden Genocides: Power, Knowledge, Memory (A.L. Hinton, T.L. Pointe, & D. Irvin-Erickson, Eds.). Rutgers University Press.
- O'Brien, M. (2022). From Discrimination to Death: Genocide Process Through a Human Rights Lens. Routledge.
- Ostler, Jeffrey. (2019). Surviving Genocide: Native Nations and the United States from the American Revolution to Bleeding Kansas. Yale University Press. doi:10.2307/j.ctvgc629z
- Palmer, Alison (1998). "Colonial and modern genocide: explanations and categories", Ethnic and Racial Studies, 21:1, pp. 89–115
- Rafter, Nicole (2016). The Crime of All Crimes: Toward a Criminology of Genocide. NYU Press. ISBN 978-1-4798-5948-1. JSTOR j.ctt1803ztk.
- Rechtman, Richard (2021). Living in Death: Genocide and Its Functionaries. Fordham University Press. doi:10.1515/9780823297887. ISBN 978-0-8232-9788-7. JSTOR j.ctv1zm2tct.
- Robben, Antonius C.G.M. and Alexander Laban Hinton (2023). Perpetrators: Encountering Humanity's Dark Side. Stanford: Stanford University Press. ISBN 978-1-503-63427-5.
- Rummel, Rudolph J. (1994). "Power, Genocide and Mass Murder". Journal of Peace Research. 31 (1): 1–10. doi:10.1177/0022343394031001001. ISSN 0022-3433. JSTOR 425578. S2CID 109210378.
- Sagall, Sabby (2013). Final Solutions: Human Nature, Capitalism and Genocide. Pluto Press. doi:10.2307/j.ctt183p6pr. ISBN 978-0-7453-2653-5. JSTOR j.ctt183p6pr.
- Sainati, Tatiana E. (2012). "Toward a Comparative Approach to the Crime of Genocide". Duke Law Journal. 62 (1): 161–202. ISSN 0012-7086. JSTOR 23268983.
- Sartre, Jean-Paul (1968). On genocide.: And a summary of the evidence and the judgments of the International War Crimes Tribunal. Boston: Beacon Press. OL 5629332M.
- Smith, R.W. (2014). Genocide Denial and Prevention. Genocide Studies International, 8(1), 102–109. JSTOR 26985995
- van Schaack, Beth (1997). "The Crime of Political Genocide: Repairing the Genocide Convention's Blind Spot". The Yale Law Journal. 106 (7): 2259–2291. doi:10.2307/797169. JSTOR 797169.ISSN 0044-0094
- Shaw, M. (2011). "Britain and genocide: historical and contemporary parameters of national responsibility" (PDF). Review of International Studies. 37 (5): 2417–2438. doi:10.1017/S0260210510001245. ISSN 0260-2105. S2CID 145721044.
- Spencer, Philip (2013). "Imperialism, Anti-Imperialism and the Problem of Genocide, Past and Present". History. 98 (4 (332)): 606–622. doi:10.1111/1468-229X.12027. ISSN 0018-2648. JSTOR 24429510.
- Stannard, David (1992). American holocaust : the conquest of the new world. Oxford University Press, US.
- Stannard, David (1996). "Uniqueness as Denial: The Politics of Genocide Scholarship", published in Is the Holocaust Unique? edited by Alan S. Rosenbaum. Westview Press. Boulder, CO. ISBN 9780429037009
- Staub, E. (1992). The Roots of Evil: The Origins of Genocide and Other Group Violence (Rev. ed.). Cambridge University Press.
- Straus, Scott (2015). Making and Unmaking Nations: War, Leadership, and Genocide in Modern Africa (1st ed.). Cornell University Press. ISBN 978-0-8014-5332-8. JSTOR 10.7591/j.ctt20fw633.
- Theriault, Henry C. (2010). "Genocidal Mutation and the Challenge of Definition". Metaphilosophy. 41 (4): 481–524. doi:10.1111/j.1467-9973.2010.01658.x. ISSN 0026-1068. JSTOR 24439632.
- Stoett, Peter. (1995). "This Age of Genocide: Conceptual and Institutional Implications." International Journal, L:3, 594-618.
- Thornton, Russell. (1987). American Indian holocaust and survival: a population history since 1492 (1st ed.). University of Oklahoma Press.
- Totten, S., Parsons, W. S., & Charny, I. W. (1994). Genocide in the twentieth century: Critical essays and eyewitness accounts. New York: Garland.
- Valentino, B.A. (2013). Final Solutions: Mass Killing and Genocide in the 20th Century. Cornell University Press.
- Weiss-Wendt, A., & Irvin-Erickson, D. (2018). A Rhetorical Crime: Genocide in the Geopolitical Discourse of the Cold War. Rutgers University Press.
- Weitz, E.D. (2015). A Century of Genocide: Utopias of Race and Nation (Rev. ed.). Princeton University Press.
- Williams, T. (2020). The Complexity of Evil: Perpetration and Genocide. Rutgers University Press.
- Wolfe, Patrick. (1999). Settler Colonialism and the Transformation of Anthropology:the Politics and Poetics of an Ethnographic Event, London and New York.
- Wolfe, Patrick. (2008). "Settler Colonialism and the Elimination of the Native", Jnl. of Genocide Research, 8, 4, 2006; Development Dialogue, No. 50.
- Zimmerer, Jürgen. (2024) Colonialism and the Holocaust: Towards an Archaeology of Genocide. From Windhoek to Auschwitz?: Reflections on the Relationship between Colonialism and National Socialism, Berlin, Boston: De Gruyter Oldenbourg, pp. 125–153.

=== Prevention ===
- Barkan, E., Goschler, C., & Waller, J. (Eds.). (2022). Historical Dialogue and the Prevention of Mass Atrocities. Routledge.
- Harff, B., & Gurr, T.R. (Eds.). (2018). Preventing Mass Atrocities: Policies and Practices. Routledge.

=== Conventions and Agreements ===
- Kunz, Josef L. (October 1949). "The United Nations Convention on Genocide". American Journal of International Law. 43 (4): 738–746. doi:10.2307/2193262. ISSN 0002-9300. JSTOR 2193262. S2CID 147258963.
- Tams, Christian J.; Berster, Lars; Schiffbauer, Björn (2024). The Genocide Convention – Article-by-Article Commentary, 2nd ed.. C.H. Beck / Nomos / Hart Publishing, ISBN 978-3-406-81272-9

==== Legal ====
- Gurmendi Dunkelberg, Alonso (2025): "How to Hide a Genocide: Modern/Colonial International Law and the Construction of Impunity", Journal of Genocide Research, DOI: 10.1080/14623528.2025.2454739.
- Greenawalt, Alexander K.A. (1999). "Rethinking Genocidal Intent: The Case for a Knowledge-Based Interpretation". Columbia Law Review. 99 (8): 2259–2294. doi:10.2307/1123611. ISSN 0010-1958. JSTOR 1123611.
- Greenfield, Daniel M. (2008). "The Crime of Complicity in Genocide: How the International Criminal Tribunals for Rwanda and Yugoslavia Got It Wrong, and Why It Matters". The Journal of Criminal Law and Criminology. 98 (3): 921–952. ISSN 0091-4169. JSTOR 40042790.
- Ristea, Ion (2011). "The Concept of Genocide in International Law". Geopolitics, History, and International Relations. 3 (1): 221–226. ISSN 1948-9145. JSTOR 26804858.
- Sainati, T. E. (2012). "Toward a comparative approach to the crime of genocide". Duke Law Journal. 62 (1): 161–202. JSTOR 23268983.

=== Biographical ===
- Irvin-Erickson, Douglas (2017). Raphael Lemkin and the Concept of Genocide. University of Pennsylvania Press. ISBN 978-0-8122-4864-7. JSTOR j.ctv2t4ds5.
- Bartrop, Paul Robert (2012). A Biographical Encyclopedia of Contemporary Genocide: Portraits of Evil and Good. ABC-CLIO. ISBN 978-0-313-38678-7

=== Gender and sexual violence ===
- Eboe-Osuji, Chile (2012). International Law and Sexual Violence in Armed Conflicts. Brill. ISBN 978-90-04-22722-4. JSTOR 10.1163/j.ctt1w76w29.
- Fitzpatrick, Brenda (2016). Tactical rape in war and conflict: International recognition and response (1st ed.). Bristol University Press. doi:10.2307/j.ctt1t894z4. ISBN 978-1-4473-2671-7. JSTOR j.ctt1t894z4. S2CID 248607708.
- MacKinnon, Catharine A. (2005). "Genocide's Sexuality". Nomos. 46: 313–356. ISSN 0078-0979. JSTOR 24220154.

=== White genocide conspiracy theory ===
- Dyck, K. (2019). "They'll Take Away Our Birthrights": How White-Power Musicians Instill Fear of White Extinction. In T. D. Boyce & W. M. Chunnu (Eds.), Historicizing Fear: Ignorance, Vilification, and Othering (pp. 73–87). University Press of Colorado.
- Kamali, S. (2021). White Genocide: Grievances of White Nationalists. In Homegrown Hate: Why White Nationalists and Militant Islamists Are Waging War against the United States (1st ed., pp. 113–136). University of California Press.
- Temoney, K.E. (2020). Anatomizing White Rage: "Race is My Religion!" and "White Genocide." In S.C. Finley, B.M. Gray, & L.L. Martin (Eds.), The Religion of White Rage: Religious Fervor, White Workers and the Myth of Black Racial Progress (pp. 149–165). Edinburgh University Press.

== Historiography and memory studies ==
- Murray, S. W. (Ed.). (2017). Understanding Atrocities: Remembering, Representing and Teaching Genocide. University of Calgary Press.
- Dudley, M.Q. (2017). "A Library Matter of Genocide: The Library of Congress and the Historiography of the Native American Holocaust". The International Indigenous Policy Journal, 8(2).
- Stone, Dan (2011). The historiography of genocide. Palgrave Macmillan.

== Reference works ==
- Bartrop, Paul R.; Jacobs, Steven Leonard (eds.). (2014). Modern Genocide: The Definitive Resource and Document Collection [4 volumes]: The Definitive Resource and Document Collection. ABC-CLIO. ISBN 978-1-61069-364-6
- Blackhawk, Ned. (2023) The Cambridge World History of Genocide. Edited by N. Blackhawk, B. Kiernan, B. Madley, and R. Taylor. Cambridge: Cambridge University Press (The Cambridge World History of Genocide). doi:10.1017/9781108765480
- Bloxham, D., & Moses, A. Dirk. (2010). The Oxford Handbook of Genocide Studies. Oxford University Press.

== Academic journals ==
- Genocide Studies International – published by the University of Toronto Press and associated with the International Institute for Genocide and Human Rights at the Zoryan Institute
- Genocide Studies and Prevention: An International Journal – associated with IAGS
- Holocaust and Genocide Studies – associated with the United States Holocaust Memorial Museum
- Journal of Genocide Research – associated with INoGS

== Primary sources ==
Works below are items related to the development of Genocide studies.

- Key Writings of Raphael Lemkin on Genocide
- Raphael Lemkin papers, 1947–1959, New York Public Library Archives and Manuscripts.
- Raphael Lemkin Collection, The Center for Jewish History.
- Lemkin, R. (1946). Genocide. The American Scholar, 15(2), 227–230.
- Lemkin, R. (1949). Genocide: A Commentary on the Convention. The Yale Law Journal, 58(7), 1142–1160.

== See also ==
- Bibliography of the Holocaust
- Bibliography of the Rwandan genocide
- Bibliography of the Armenian genocide
