= 1491 (disambiguation) =

1491 (MCDXCI) was a common year.

1491 may also refer to:

- 1491 (musical), a 1969 musical about Christopher Columbus by Meredith Willson
- 1491 Balduinus, an outer main-belt asteroid
- 1491: New Revelations of the Americas Before Columbus, a 2005 non-fiction book by American author Charles C. Mann
  - 1491: The Untold Story of the Americas Before Columbus, a 2018 Canadian television miniseries based on the book
- 1491s, a Native American sketch comedy troupe
- Aeroflot Flight 1491, a passenger flight that crashed on 18 May 1972
- NGC 1491, a nebula in the constellation of Perseus
