= Nomads of the Longbow =

Book by Allan R. Holmberg

Nomads of the Longbow is a book by Allan R. Holmberg, an anthropologist who studied Peruvian and other South American indigenous peoples. The book concerns itself with the indigenous Bolivian Sirionó people, whom he determined to be rather backward and undeveloped in terms of culture and civilization. This determination was applied to other indigenous groups of people from both North and South America. Holmberg's conclusions, and his basis for those conclusions, have been strongly rejected in 1491: New Revelations of the Americas Before Columbus by Charles C. Mann.
