= American colonies (disambiguation) =

American colonies usually refer to the Thirteen Colonies, the British colonies that existed from 1607 to 1776. American colonies may also refer to:

- American Colonies, a 2001 book by Alan Taylor
- Thirteen Colonies, which became the United States of America in 1776
- United Colonies, name of the United States used in 1775 until September 1776
- European colonization of the Americas
- American imperialism

== See also ==
- United States territorial acquisitions
- Chronology of the colonization of North America
- Colonial history of the United States
- European colonization of the Southern United States
- Former colonies and territories in Canada
