= American Genocide =

American Genocide may refer to:

- American Holocaust (book)
- Genocide of indigenous peoples in the United States
- Black genocide in the United States
- The 2017 book An American Genocide
