= David J. Weber =

American historian

David Joseph Weber (December 20, 1940 – August 20, 2010) was an American historian whose research focused on the history of the Southwestern U.S. and its transition from Spanish and Mexican control to becoming part of the United States. For a period of time, this field of study had largely been ignored, as both United States and Latin American historians concentrated on the central stories in their fields. He "was among the first scholars to focus on the importance of the relationship between Mexico and the United States."

At Southern Methodist University, Weber established the William P. Clements Center for Southwest Studies and later was chair of the history department. His books won history awards, he was among the leaders in scholarship of the borderlands of the Southwest, and he received awards from the governments of both Spain and Mexico for his work.

== Early life ==
David Weber was the oldest child of Theodore Carl Weber and Frances Jean; he had two younger brothers and a sister. He was born on December 20, 1940, in Buffalo, New York and raised in nearby Cheektowaga. After several years of Catholic school, Weber finished his education in local public schools. He graduated from Maryvale High School in 1958. During his high school education, Weber lettered in track, basketball, and tennis and was also a member of the school band. Although he was offered a full scholarship for track to Cornell University, Weber chose not to pursue further competition in the sport.

He attended the State University of New York at Fredonia, where he initially planned to major in music. A course in the History of Latin America led him in a different direction, and he graduated in 1962 with a bachelor's degree in social sciences. Shortly after graduation, he married Carol, a woman he had met at a band competition during high school.

Weber knew he wanted to pursue a master's degree in either history or English. His professor Marvin D. Bernstein suggested that he consider pursuing a master's and doctorate in Latin American history. Bernstein helped Weber choose an appropriate university; both were concerned that the larger universities with specialties in Latin American history (such as the University of Texas at Austin or University of California, Berkeley) might be too large for someone from such a small town. Weber chose the University of New Mexico. Weber was the first recipient of the JFK Scholarship, which he was personally presented by Edward Kennedy. Weber also played in a band to earn money while in school. During the first year of his graduate work, his in-laws also sent the couple money. The couple welcomed their first child, Scott, in December 1964.

Weber earned a master's degree in 1964 and a doctorate in 1967, with the dissertation The Taos Trappers: The Fur Trade in the Far Southwest, 1540-1846. The dissertation topic was suggested by his mentor, Donald Cutter, who specialized in history of the Spanish borderlands. By the time he completed his doctorate, Weber had already edited two works for publication and had three articles published in historical journals. Shortly after his graduation, the couple's second child, Amy, was born.

== Career ==
Weber joined the faculty of San Diego State University in 1967 and taught at the Universidad de Costa Rica in 1970, lecturing in Spanish, as part of the Fulbright Program. In 1973, he was promoted to full professor at San Diego State. Unhappy with his teaching load, Weber began looking for other opportunities.

In 1976 Weber accepted a position at Southern Methodist University, where he established the William P. Clements Center for Southwest Studies. He later became chair of the history department. In 1986, Weber relinquished his duties as department chair. For the next year, he served as a fellow at the Center for Advanced Study in the Behavioral Sciences at Stanford University. He returned to SMU the next year, as the first Robert H. and Nancy Dedman Chair in History.

Among the more than 20 books he authored on the subject, his books The Mexican Frontier, 1821-1846: The American Southwest Under Mexico (1982), Barbáros: Spaniards and their Savages in the Age of Enlightenment (2008), and The Spanish Frontier in North America (1992), documented and explored elements about the Spanish conquest, Indios Bárbaros, and its effects on Native Americans. Weber also explored the growth of the English-speaking population (generally migrants from the United States) in areas that would later become parts of the United States. Historian Jesus de la Teja described Weber's The Mexican Frontier as "a game changer in the field of the history of the Southwest". The book was reprinted in Spanish and published in Mexico and Spain. As of 2013, it was still in print.

== Death ==
Weber continued to teach and advise students while dealing with cancer and undergoing chemotherapy, teaching classes through the spring 2010 semester. Weber died due to complications of multiple myeloma, aged 69, on August 20, 2010, in Gallup, New Mexico. He was survived by his wife, a daughter, a son and three grandchildren.

== Reception and awards ==
The Mexican Frontier won the Ray Allen Billington Prize from the Organization of American Historians in 1983, the Westerners International Co-Founders Book Award for best nonfiction of 1982, and the 1982 history Award from the Border Regional Library Association. It also won the Presidio La Bahia Award from the Sons of the Texas Republic. Spanish Frontier won the Carr P. Collins Award from the Texas Institute of Letters for best nonfiction book of 1992. The book also received the Premio Espana y America award from the Spanish Ministry of Culture. His final book, Barbaros won the John E. Fagg Prize in 2006 from the American Historical Association.

William J. Cronon of the University of Wisconsin, Madison called him "probably the single most important scholar of Spanish borderland history in North America in the second half of the 20th century", saying that "There is no one to compare with him in terms of original scholarship or sweeping synthesis." Benjamin Johnson of SMU said that "he was at least a generation ahead of his time in recognizing how entwined Mexico and the United States were and are". De la Teja held The Mexican Frontier as "the seminal study that confirmed Weber's status as the leading representative of a new kind of borderlands history."

Weber was recognized by the Spanish government with the Order of Isabella the Catholic in 2002, and by the Mexican government with the Order of the Aztec Eagle in 2005, the highest honor that each nation awards to foreigners. He was inducted as a fellow of the American Academy of Arts and Sciences in 2007. Weber was one of few non-Mexicans to be inducted into the Academia Mexicana de la Historia. He became a lifetime fellow of the Texas State Historical Association in 1985, and became a member of the Texas Institute of Letters in 1984. In 1990 and 1991, he served as president of the Western History Association.

== Analysis ==
Although Weber was raised Catholic, his studies of the Catholic Church in Latin America disillusioned him. In The Mexican Frontier, he was critical of Catholic efforts to settle the New World. By The Spanish Frontier, he presented the church and religion in anthropological terms, an effort noted as "balanced" by a reviewer in the Catholic Southwest.

Weber was one of the first historians to incorporate the Tejano perspective into an analysis of the Texas Revolution. Previous works had focused exclusively on the European-American settlers from the US in Texas and had failed to note that they were supported by many Mexican-born citizens. His work also, for the first time, linked the revolution with the settlers' dissatisfaction with the extremely unstable state of Mexican politics during that era.

== Sources ==
- de la Teja, Jesus (2013). "David J. Weber". In Cox, Patrick L.; Hendrickson, Kenneth E. Jr. (eds.). Writing the Story of Texas. University of Texas Press. ISBN 978-0292748750.
