= American Colonies =

2001 book by Alan Taylor

- First paperback edition, July 30, 2002
- Author: Alan Taylor
- Language: English
- Publisher: Viking Press
- Publication date: November 12, 2001
- Pages: 526

American Colonies: The Settling of North America is a book about early American history by Alan Taylor, first published on November 12, 2001, by Viking Press. It is the first volume of the Penguin History of the United States.

The book is divided into three major parts: "Encounters", "Colonies", and "Empires". These sections discuss, respectively, the colonial encounter between European settlers and the Indigenous peoples in North America, including through colonial projects such as New Spain; colonies such as the New England Colonies and the province of Carolina; and imperial domains including New France and British America. American Colonies rejects American exceptionalism, focusing on slavery and the displacement and depopulation of Indigenous peoples. It employs the methods of social history and environmental history, among other approaches.

Andrew Cayton describes the book as a "balanced synthesis" of a trend in historical scholarship emphasizing the pluralism and diversity of colonial-era North America, a place in which Indigenous people of the Americas and enslaved Africans, as well as Europeans, created novel social arrangements. A starred review in Publishers Weekly likewise noted that American Colonies "challenges traditional Anglocentric interpretations of colonial history by focusing more evenly on the myriad influences on North America's development". Osita Nwanevu, in a retrospective review of American Colonies along with Taylor's later works American Revolutions and American Republics, noted that American Colonies is organized in a more conventional, chronological manner than the other two, which focus on themes.

== See also ==
- Mancall, P. C. (2026). Contested Continent: The Struggle for North America, c. 1000–1680 (Hardcover ed.). Oxford University Press.
