= 1491: The Untold Story of the Americas Before Columbus =

Canadian television miniseries

1491: The Untold Story of the Americas Before Columbus is an eight-episode docudrama television miniseries based on The New York Times best-selling book 1491: New Revelations of the Americas Before Columbus by Charles C. Mann (Knopf, 2005).

== Background ==
The miniseries was co-produced in Canada by Aarrow Productions (Victoria, British Columbia) and Animiki See Digital Production Inc. (Winnipeg, Manitoba) and first aired in Canada on the Aboriginal Peoples Television Network (APTN) in 2017. Filming took place in Canada, the United States, Mexico and Peru and its creation involved over 400 Indigenous cast and crew members.

Through dramatic re-enactment, narrator voice-overs and interviews with leading Indigenous scholars, the series illustrates that before the arrival of Columbus in the Americas the Western Hemisphere was heavily populated with Indigenous societies which were highly advanced in agriculture, astronomy, architecture, governance, medicine, technology, science, trade and art. Specific examples are shown from eight geographic regions covering the entirety of North and South America. Presented from an Indigenous perspective, the series follows a timeline from 20,000 years ago to 1491.

== Episodes ==
Episode 1: Origins Explores indigenous origin stories as well as discoveries by archaeologists, anthropologists, geneticists and linguists on how and when Indigenous people first arrived in the Western Hemisphere.

Episode 2: Environment Indigenous people created significant changes to their environment through resource harvesting, farming, urban development, irrigation, controlled burning and deforestation.

Episode 3: Agriculture Maize was first developed in the Americas from a wild plant known as teosinte. Crops like sweet potato, beans and cacao were cultivated and spread throughout the Americas via well-developed trade networks.

Episode 4: Architecture Indigenous people in the Americas developed iconic and innovative architectural styles depending on their needs for shelter and available resources.

Episode 5: Governance and Trade Governance models were developed by each Indigenous nation to control their citizens and establish normative behaviours. The Americas are replete with a variety of examples: from patriarchal and matrilineal-based societies, to complex political systems governing multi-nation empires.

Episode 6: Science and Technology Scientific and technological ingenuity in the Americas is apparent through specific examples such as the earliest use of the number "0", the mapping of the planets and the stars, the development of multi-year calendars, and the invention of writing systems.

Episode 7: Art Depending on the natural resources in each region, art was created which reflected a specific Indigenous world view. Many of these artistic expressions have survived to this day through the preservation and perpetuation of each unique style.

Episode 8: Continuance Despite 500 years of pressure to assimilate, Indigenous culture has been retained and reclaimed through repatriation of material culture and programs promoting language preservation and indigenous literacy.

== Key creative contributors ==
Co-Produced by: Aarrow Productions (Victoria, BC) and Animiki See Digital Productions (Winnipeg, Manitoba)

Executive Producer: Pat Ferns

Writers: Barbara Hager (Cree/Métis) and Marie Clements (Métis)

Directors: Barbara Hager (Cree/Métis) and Lisa Jackson (Anishinaabe)

Composer: Russell Wallace (Lil'wat)

Production Designer: Teresa Weston

Costume Designer: Carmen Thompson (Nuu-chah-nulth)

Director of Photography: Bob Aschmann

Editors: Michael Clark and Tyler Gamsby

Narrator: Dr. Evan Adams (Tla'amin)

== Awards ==
The miniseries won 2018 Leo Awards for:

- Best Documentary Series
- Best Screenwriting in a Documentary Series (Barbara Hager)
- Best Musical Score in a Documentary Series (Russell Wallace)

== Sources ==
Times Colonist Article, November 2017 Miniseries 1491, led by Victoria's Barbara Hager, offers a different view of history

Playback Article, February 2014 APTN to go into production on 1491

Playback Article, October 2017 APTN preps docu-drama 1491

Pow-wows.com Article, November 2017 New TV Series '1491: The Untold Story of the Americas before Columbus'

Newswire Article, October 2017 Indigenous-produced docu-drama series "1491" reveals untold history of the Americas before Columbus

Nation Talk Article, October 2017 Indigenous-produced docu-drama series “1491” reveals untold history of the Americas before Columbus

TV-Eh? Article, October 2017 Indigenous-produced docu-drama series “1491” reveals untold history of the Americas before Columbus | TV, eh?
