= The Spanish Frontier in North America =

1992 non-fiction book by David J. Weber

- Author: David J. Weber
- Genre: Non-fiction
- Publisher: Yale University Press
- Publication date: 1992

The Spanish Frontier in North America is a nonfiction book written by historian David J. Weber. The Texas Institute of Letters named it the best nonfiction book of 1992. The Spanish Ministry of Culture also recognized it.

== Analysis ==
Weber followed the school of thought initiated by historian Herbert Eugene Bolton, that American history should not be centered solely around the expansion of the original thirteen colonies. Weber's book would reveal the Spanish roots and influence in North America, although he limited the definition of North America to areas north of Mexico. In a departure from Bolton's model, Weber also examined the lives of the Indians and mestizos in the region and their impact on the frontier. Their legacy was extended to modern times, as Weber shows how the Chicano movement of the mid-twentieth century adopted some older legends.

== Reception ==
Spanish Frontier won the Carr P. Collins Award from the Texas Institute of Letters for best nonfiction book of 1992. The book also received the Premio España y América award from the Spanish Ministry of Culture.

== Sources ==
- Barrenechea, Antonio. "Good Neighbor/Bad Neighbor: Boltonian Americanism and Hemispheric Studies" (PDF). Comparative Literature. 61 (3).
- de la Teja, Jesus (2013). "David J. Weber". In Cox, Patrick L.; Hendrickson, Kenneth E. Jr. (eds.). Writing the Story of Texas. University of Texas Press. ISBN 0292748752.
