= David E. Stannard =

American historian (born 1941)

David Edward Stannard (born 1941) is an American historian and Professor of American Studies at the University of Hawaiʻi. He is particularly known for his book American Holocaust (Oxford University Press, 1992), in which he argues that European colonization of the Americas after the arrival of Christopher Columbus resulted in some of the largest series of genocides in history.

== Career ==
After returning to college in 1968, Stannard graduated magna cum laude from San Francisco State University in 1971. He then went to Yale and obtained an M.A. degree in history (1972), a Master of Philosophy in American Studies (1973), and a Ph.D. in American Studies in 1975. He has taught at Yale University, Stanford University, the University of Colorado, and the University of Hawaii. He has lectured throughout the United States, in Europe, and in Asia.

He is currently a writer and professor in the Department of American Studies at the University of Hawaii, where he was awarded the Regents' Medal for Excellence in teaching. He has contributed dozens of articles to scholarly journals in a variety of fields.

=== American Holocaust ===
Stannard's research on the indigenous peoples of North and South America (including Hawaii) has produced the conclusion that Native Americans had undergone the "worst human holocaust the world had ever witnessed, roaring across two continents non-stop for four centuries and consuming the lives of countless tens of millions of people." While acknowledging that the majority of the indigenous peoples fell victim to the ravages of European disease, he estimates that almost 100 million died in what he calls the American Holocaust. In response to Stannard's figures, political scientist Rudolph Rummel has estimated that over the centuries of European colonization about 2 million to 15 million American indigenous people were the victims of what he calls democide, which excludes military battles and unintentional deaths in Rummel's definition. "Even if these figures are remotely true," writes Rummel, "then this still make this subjugation of the Americas one of the bloodier, centuries long, democides in world history." According to Guenter Lewy, Stannard's perspective has been joined by noted scholars and activists including Kirkpatrick Sale, Ben Kiernan, Lenore A. Stiffarm, Phil Lane Jr., and Ward Churchill.

Samuel R. Cook of The American Indian Quarterly wrote:

American Holocaust is a substantial addition to the library of injustice toward American Natives....From an ethical standpoint, works such as Stannard's are necessary to counterbalance the ethnocentricities of past historical works on Natives. From an academic standpoint, the book is an interdisciplinary monument. The author has taken an incredible amount of data and applied contemporary anthropological, demographic, and historical techniques to synthesize a comprehensive piece of scholarship. American Holocaust will provide a desirable textbook for students at both the graduate and undergraduate levels. Finally, scholars of Indian-white relations from various disciplines will find the book a valuable resource in terms of method and content."

Alfred Crosby of The Boston Sunday Globe wrote:

An important work that will have [Stannard] canonized by some and pilloried by others by the end of the Quincentennial Year. It is the product of massive reading in the important sources, years of pondering, and fury at what Europe hath wrought in America....His convincing claim is that what happened was the worst demographic disaster in the history of our species, that Old World diseases and Old World brutality reduced the number of Indians enormously and drove away many Native American peoples over the brink of extinction. How convincing are his evidence and reasoning? Very, I am unhappy to say....Nothing can be done to improve the past, but we can at least face it. David Stannard insists that we do."

Francis Jennings of Early American Literature wrote in his review of the book:

I must note how powerfully this book's prose carries a reader forward. Although Stannard disclaims intent for propaganda, he achieves it massively. He writes up a storm. In my desire to stress what is praiseworthy, I have used up my assigned space, but I must at least mention Stannard's silly season efforts to blame Europeans' sadism on the sexual repression of Christianity...

== Personal life ==
Stannard was the longtime partner of Hawaiian nationalist, University of Hawaii professor emerita, and author Haunani-Kay Trask.

== Works ==
Stannard's published books include:

- Death in America (University of Pennsylvania Press, 1975),
- The Puritan Way of Death: A Study in Religion, Culture, and Social Change (Oxford University Press, 1977),
- Shrinking History: On Freud and the Failure of Psychohistory (Oxford University Press, 1980),
- Before the Horror: The Population of Hawaii on the Eve of Western Contact (University of Hawaii Press, 1989),
- American Holocaust: The Conquest of the New World (Oxford University Press, 1992), and
- Honor Killing: How the Infamous "Massie Affair" Transformed Hawaii (Viking Press, 2005).

The Puritan Way of Death was referred to in The New York Review of Books as one of the handful of books—and the only one by an American—that together constituted "the most original and important historical advance of the 1970s."

Shrinking History, published in 1980, was chosen by Psychology Today as one of the 'best books of the year'. His other writings have been translated into German, French, Spanish, Italian, Turkish, and Japanese.

In American Holocaust, he argues that the destruction of the aboriginal peoples of the Americas, in a "string of genocide campaigns" by Europeans and their descendants, was the most massive act of genocide in the history of the world. Although praised by Howard Zinn, Vine Deloria, Dee Brown and others, Stannard's argument generated a great deal of critical commentary. He responded to much of it in a lengthy essay entitled "Uniqueness as Denial: The Politics of Genocide Scholarship", published in Is the Holocaust Unique?, edited by Alan S. Rosenbaum (Westview Press, 1996).

Before the Horror has focused on Hawaii and the Pacific. Having dramatically and upwardly revised the estimated population of Hawaii at the time of Western contact from about 200,000 to between 800,000 and 1,000,000—a change that forced major rethinking about the entirety of Hawaii's history—that work is now being used as the foundation for re-examinations of indigenous population histories throughout the Pacific.

In 2005 Stannard's book Honor Killing used an infamous rape and murder case of the 1930s—one that involved Clarence Darrow arguing his final spectacular defense—to open up a detailed social and political examination of the Hawaiian Islands under US colonial rule. In its review The New York Review of Books described Honor Killing as "finely written and meticulously researched... a biopsy of the racist and imperial arrogance that are an integral, though seldom acknowledged, motif of the history of America."

== Awards ==
Stannard was the recipient of Guggenheim, Rockefeller, American Council of Learned Societies and other research fellowships and awards.
