= Indios Bárbaros =

Term used by Spanish colonists

Indios Bárbaros was a term used by Spanish colonists in New Spain during the seventeenth to nineteenth centuries to describe Indigenous peoples who resisted conversion and colonisation on the frontiers of Spanish imperial possessions in the Americas and what is now known as Mexico. More broadly speaking, the Indigenous communities that were not subjected to the Spanish Crown at that time were also present in territories all the way from Central America provinces as the Gulf of Darién, to the most southern regions of South America such as Patagonia, or Tierra del Fuego. Literally translating to “barbarian Indians,” the term was used both broadly to refer to any Indigenous person the Spanish deemed “uncivilized” and specifically towards so-called “Indian rebels” in battle with Spaniards on the northern frontiers of New Spain.

== Historical origins ==
The civ/sav dichotomy was not a new concept when members of the Spanish Empire began labelling the Indigenous peoples they encountered as uncivilized. In traditional European colonial literature, the idea of “barbarism” denoted the absence of abilities and institutions, primarily political, social, and economic systems deemed missing by the European standard. The label of barbarian did not refer to the inhumanity of individuals, but rather to their level of development and civilization; perhaps as a result of this distinction, those labeled as barbarians — and, similarly, “savages” — were seen not as beasts but rather backwards, unruly humans with the potential to become civilized. Referring to these Indigenous groups as barbarians in narratives showed the European way to describe populations and customs that did not fit within the traditional European norms of the time. Authors of the 16th century such as Montaigne denounced the eurocentrism of these imperial powers towards the encounter with foreign languages, traditions and religions.

Certain romanticized narratives of foreigners in Eurasia and Africa can also be traced back to eighth-century B.C. Greek explorers, like Homer and Xenophon, who labelled the people they encountered as notably distinct and less civilized. In fact, the narratives of Ancient Greece authors explained that the Greeks would use the term "barbarian" for any individual coming from a foreign nation.

Enlightenment, a system of thought that emerged during the 17th and 18th century in Europe, relied on Greco-Roman ideals of humanity such as moral virtue and rationality. This philosophy suggested that humanity had progressed from a state of savagery to a state of civilization. Those who did not adhere to the European understanding of humanity could be deemed uncivilized. The people labelled Indios Bárbaros by the Spanish Empire were deemed less evolved than some of the European Empires.

== Spanish colonial ideals ==
There were multiple factors that the Spaniards believed defined Indios Bárbaros. For one, Indios Bárbaros were not Christian, whether by refusal or unknowingness. Additionally, the "loose social and political organization" of Indigenous societies was deemed uncivilized in comparison the Spanish Empire and was therefore a contributing factor towards the term Indios Bárbaros.

European epistemology was also very faith-centered and existed at a time when it was agreed that rational creatures—Christians—had the right to self-government and private property. This meant that non-Christians could be deprived of their rights and their land in expansionist Spanish plans. In Spain, early religious scholars of the Americas like Peter Martyr and José de Acosta contributed to the infantilization of native Americans, preaching that the salvation of the Americas would come through widespread conversion of Christianity, which had the capacity to turn so-called barbarous societies civil.

Several other similar terms such as Indios sometidos, Indios reducidos or Indios domesticos became used during this time, all used to describe Indigenous populations on a scale from civilized to "savage."

== Interactions with Indios Bárbaros ==
The rise of the House of Bourbon in Spain marked a significant transition in imperial policy. Prior to 1700, the Hapsburg rulers of Spain maintained an unclear vision of New Spain, unevenly enforcing laws, using primarily coercive religious efforts to subdue native populations, and not prioritizing economic and social issues. The Bourbons sought to use economic incentives to Hispanicize native groups, understanding the limits of missionary activity. Some Spaniards, such as Félix de Azara, advocated that Indigenous enlightenment — and subsequent conversion — required first the incorporation of native groups into a system of “trade and kind treatment.”

While Bourbon efforts to control groups through commerce had some success, many native communities not under Spanish rule resisted efforts. As such, the characterization of Bárbaros as violent, unenlightened communities that lacked reason acted as a rhetorical decision to justify extreme force in subjugating Indigenous groups.

=== Interactions along the frontiers ===
Interactions between the Spanish and Indios Bárbaros were characterized predominantly by hostility. In the south, Spaniards described nomadic Aracuanians as “wild men extraordinary,” and engaged in warfare with them throughout the 1600s and 1700s. Spaniards began to characterize the Aracuanians as Bárbaros as justification of abandoning peaceful commercial operations and increasing warfare.

In the northern frontiers, the Comanche and Ute were labeled as Bárbaros as Spaniards rationalized continued violence through their descriptions of these groups as inherently violent.

Spanish relations with the Miskitu people in Nicaragua and Honduras involved the application of the classification of Indios Bárbaros to justify excessive force. In times of peace, characterizations of the Miskitu people were neutral and rarely included the term Bárbaros. However, in times of war, these terms increased drastically, and when advocating for policies of extermination, Spaniards would choose to characterize the Miskitu people as Bárbaros in order to invoke images of unbridled savages the necessitated the use of violence to control.

== Raids in Nuevo Léon ==
During the nineteenth century, there was a surge of Indigenous peoples resisting colonization who began attacking Spanish settlements on the northern frontiers of Mexico. These attacks were often devastating and involved kidnapping, killing, and robbery. In Nuevo León, between 1848 and 1870, there were over 800 raids, with a combined total of over 1,000 captives and 4,000,000 pesos worth of commodities taken. These attacks were quite damaging towards the Spanish empire, which had previously been under scrutiny for its failure to "whiten its Indigenous population" and all participating Indigenous peoples were labelled Indios Bárbaros.
