= 1491: New Revelations of the Americas Before Columbus =

2005 non-fiction book by Charles C. Mann

- Author: Charles C. Mann
- Genre: non-fiction
- Publisher: Knopf
- Publication date: 2005
- Pages: xii, 465 p.: ill., maps (1st ed.)
- ISBN: 978-1-4000-4006-3
- OCLC: 56632601
- Dewey Decimal: 970.01/1 22
- LC Class: E61 .M266 2005
- Followed by: 1493: Uncovering the New World Columbus Created

An indicative map of the prominent culture areas extant in the Western Hemisphere c. 1491, as presented in 1491

1491: New Revelations of the Americas Before Columbus is a 2005 non-fiction book by American author and science writer Charles C. Mann about the pre-Columbian Americas. It was the 2006 winner of the National Academies Communication Award for best creative work that helps the public's understanding of topics in science, engineering or medicine.

The book presents recent research findings from different fields which suggest human populations in the Western Hemisphere—that is, the Indigenous peoples of the Americas—were more numerous, had arrived earlier, were more sophisticated culturally, and controlled and shaped the natural landscape to a greater extent than scholars had previously thought.

The author notes that, according to these findings, two of the first six independent centers of civilization arose in the Americas: the first, Norte Chico or Caral-Supe, in present-day northern Peru; and that of formative-era Mesoamerica in what is now southern Mexico.

== Book summary ==
Mann develops his arguments from a variety of recent re-assessments of long-standing views about the pre-Columbian world, based on new findings in demography, climatology, epidemiology, economics, botany, genetics, image analysis, palynology, molecular biology, biochemistry, and soil science. Although there is no consensus, and Mann acknowledges controversies, he asserts that the general trend among scientists currently is to acknowledge:

1. (a) Population levels of indigenous peoples in the Americas were probably higher than had been traditionally believed among scientists and closer to the numbers estimated by "high counters".
  (b) Humans probably arrived in the Americas earlier than traditionally thought, over the course of multiple waves of migration to the New World and not solely by the Bering land bridge over a relatively short period of time.
2. The level of cultural advancement and the settlement range of humans was higher and broader than previously imagined.
3. The New World was not a wilderness at the time of European contact, but an environment which Indigenous peoples had been altering for thousands of years for their benefit, mostly with fire.

These three main foci (origins/population, culture, and environment) form the basis for the three parts of the book.

In the introduction, Mann challenges the thesis that Native Americans "came across the Bering Strait about thirteen thousand years ago, that they lived for the most part in small, isolated groups, and that they had so little impact on their environment that even after millennia of habitation the continents remained mostly wilderness."

=== Part One: Numbers from Nowhere ===
Mann first treats New England in the 17th century. He disagrees with the popular idea that European technologies were superior to those of Native Americans, using guns as a specific example. Native Americans considered them little more than "noisemakers", and concluded they were more difficult to aim than arrows. Prominent colonist John Smith of the southern Jamestown colony noted as an "awful truth" that a gun "could not shoot as far as an arrow could fly". Moccasins were more comfortable and sturdy than the boots Europeans wore, and were preferred by most during that era because their padding offered a more silent approach to warfare. The Indian canoes could be paddled faster and were more maneuverable than any small European boats.

Mann explores the fall of the Inca Empire and attempts to assess its population compared to the armies of conquistadors such as Francisco Pizarro. He discusses the fatal importance of the numerous newly introduced infectious diseases and the likelihood that these played a far more significant role in the decline of Native American populations than did warfare or other actions by Europeans. He notes that while Europeans probably derived less benefit than expected from their use of horses, as e.g. the stepped roads of Inca settlements were generally impassable to horses, the Inca did not maximize their use of anti-horse inventions to stop the Spanish intruders. The Inca Empire collapsed because by the time Europeans arrived in force, smallpox and other epidemics had already swept through cities and caused high mortality, due mostly to the natives' lack of immunity to Eurasian diseases.

The contrasting approaches of "High Counters" and "Low Counters" among historians in estimating pre-Columbian population levels are discussed. Among the former, anthropologist Henry F. Dobyns estimated the number of pre-Columbian Native Americans as close to 100 million, while critics of the High Counters include David Henige, who wrote Numbers from Nowhere (1998).

=== Part Two: Very Old Bones ===
Mann discusses the provenance and dating of human remains, which may provide evidence of the period of the first settlement of the Americas. The Clovis culture in New Mexico was one of the first to be assessed using carbon dating. While at first it was believed to have originated between 13,500 and 12,900 years ago, following the immigration of peoples from Siberia over the Bering land bridge, recent evidence indicates that Paleo-Indians were present in the Americas at even earlier dates.

Agriculture is another focus of this section; Mann explores Andean and Mesoamerican cultures. The agricultural development of maize from essentially inedible precursors such as teosinte was significant because it enabled the production of crop surpluses, population growth, and the rise of complex cultures, and was pivotal to the rise of civilizations such as the Olmec. Mann notes that Mesoamericans did not have the luxury of "stealing" or adopting innovations from other cultures, since they were geographically isolated in comparison to the cultures of Eurasia, where a large, relatively open landmass had resulted in extensive trading and warfare, both of which facilitated the rapid dispersal of cultural innovations between neighboring civilizations. In the Americas, cultures were somewhat more isolated from their neighbors. They apparently did not invent the wheel and mostly lacked domesticated large animals.

=== Part Three: Landscape With Figures ===
In the third section, Mann attempts a synthesis. He focuses on the Maya, whose abrupt decline appears to have been as rapid as its population growth had been. The canonical theory about the sudden disappearance of Mayan civilization, a pattern common among many Native American cultures, was stated by Sylvanus Morley:

"the Maya collapsed because they overshot the carrying capacity of their environment. They exhausted their resource base, began to die of starvation and thirst, and fled their cities 'en masse', leaving them as silent warnings of the perils of ecological hubris."

Mann discusses the growing evidence that shows Native Americans did indeed transform their lands. Most Native Americans shaped their environment with fire, using slash-and-burn techniques to clear forests and create grasslands for cultivation and to encourage the abundance of game animals. Native Americans domesticated fewer animals and cultivated plant life differently from their European counterparts, but did so quite intensively nonetheless. Ancient cultures in South America have been found to have constructed elaborate irrigation systems, terraced steep mountains to produce crops, and defensively protected their settlements.

The author suggests that Europeans' limited and often racist views about indigenous peoples, in addition to the lack of a common language among the indigenous peoples, often resulted in the failure of Europeans to recognize how Native Americans managed their lands. Some historians have drawn conclusions such as the "law of environmental limitation of culture" (Betty J. Meggers); that is, Native Americans' practices before slash and burn worked because vast expanses of healthy forest appeared to have existed before Europeans arrived.

Mann argues that in the ecological sense Native Americans were in fact a keystone species, one that "affects the survival and abundance of many other species". By the time Europeans arrived in numbers to supplant the indigenous populations in the Americas, the previous dominant cultures had already been nearly eliminated, mostly by disease. There was extensive disruption of societies and loss of environmental control as a result. Decreased environmental influence and resource competition would have led to population explosions in species such as the American bison and the passenger pigeon. Because fire clearing had ceased, forests would have expanded and become denser. The world discovered by Christopher Columbus began to change immediately after his arrival, such that Columbus "was also one of the last to see it in pure form".

Mann concludes that we must look to the past to write the future. "Native Americans ran the continent as they saw fit. Modern nations must do the same. If they want to return as much of the landscape as possible to its state in 1491, they will have to create the world's largest gardens."

== Reception ==
A review by The New York Times in 2005 stated that the book's approach is "in the best scientific tradition, carefully sifting the evidence, never jumping to hasty conclusions, giving everyone a fair hearing—the experts and the amateurs, the accounts of the Indians and their conquerors. And rarely is he less than enthralling."

== Editions ==
- 1491: New Revelations of the Americas Before Columbus. Knopf, 2005 ISBN 1-4000-3205-9.
- Ancient Americans: Rewriting the History of the New World. First UK edition. Published by Granta Books in 2005. ISBN 1862076170
- 1491: The Americas Before Columbus. ISBN 1-86207-876-9 European edition. Published in Europe by Granta Books on 6 November 2006.
- 1491: New Revelations of the Americas Before Columbus. Second edition. Vintage, 2011 ISBN 978-1-4000-3205-1
- 1491: Una nueva historia de las Américas antes de Colón (Spanish-language edition). Seven Stories Press, 2013.
- A third edition is in preparation.

== Sequel ==
In 2011, Mann published a sequel, 1493: Uncovering the New World Columbus Created. It explores the results of the European colonization of the Americas, a topic begun in Alfred Crosby's 1972 work The Columbian Exchange, which examined exchanges of plants, animals, diseases, and technologies after European contact with the Americas. Mann added much new scholarship that had been developed in the 40 years since that book was published.

== Adaptation ==
In 2017, an eight-episode documentary miniseries titled 1491: The Untold Story of the Americas Before Columbus was released by Animiki See Digital Production, Inc. and Arrow Productions.

== See also ==
- American Holocaust
- Archaeology of the Americas
- Beni savanna
- Columbian Exchange
- European colonization of the Americas
- Forest gardening
- Indian massacres
- Megafauna
- Population history of American indigenous peoples
- Quaternary extinction event
- Terra preta, anthropogenic soil found in the Amazon Basin
- Pre-Columbian agriculture in the Amazon Basin

Books

- 1493: Uncovering the New World Columbus Created
- American Holocaust
- Before the Revolution: America's Ancient Pasts by Daniel K. Richter
- Indian Givers: How the Indians of the Americas Transformed the World
- Nomads of the Longbow
- Dark Emu: Black Seeds: Agriculture or Accident?
