= Is the Holocaust Unique? =

1995 book by Alan S. Rosenbaum

Is the Holocaust Unique? Perspectives on Comparative Genocide
- Author: Alan S. Rosenbaum
- Publisher: Westview Press
- Publication date: 1995, 2000 (reprinted)
- Media type: Print (paperback)
- Pages: 288
- ISBN: 0-8133-3686-4
- Dewey Decimal: 940.53/18/072 21
- LC Class: D804.348 .I8 2001

Is the Holocaust Unique? Perspectives on Comparative Genocide is a 1995 book about the Holocaust uniqueness debate, edited by Alan Rosenbaum. In the book, scholars compare the Holocaust to other well-known instances of genocide and mass death. The book asks whether there are any historical parallels to the Jewish Holocaust and whether Armenians, Romani people, Native Americans, or others have undergone a comparable genocide.

As Alan Rosenbaum writes in regard to the book:

Any attempt by any group to keep a monopoly on language is doomed to failure ... Because anybody can use any language they want. And the term Holocaust has such power—as the paradigm case of genocide—that any group wanting to make a superlative case for its own experience would naturally want to borrow it.

A second edition was printed in 2000 and a third edition was released in 2009.

== Contents ==
- The ethics of uniqueness by John K. Roth
- Religion and the uniqueness of the Holocaust by Richard L. Rubenstein
- From the Holocaust: some legal and moral implications by Richard J. Goldstone
- The uniqueness of the Holocaust: the historical dimension by Steven T. Katz
- Responses to the Porrajmos: the Romani Holocaust by Ian Hancock
- The Atlantic slave trade and the Holocaust: a comparative analysis by Seymour Drescher
- The Armenian genocide as precursor and prototype of twentieth-century genocide by Robert F. Melson
- The comparative aspects of the Armenian and Jewish cases of genocide: a sociohistorical perspective by Vahakn N. Dadrian
- Stalinist terror and the question of genocide: the great famine by Barbara B. Green
- The Holocaust and the Japanese atrocities by Kinue Tokudome
- Applying the lessons of the Holocaust by Shimon Samuels
- The rise and fall of metaphor: German historians and the uniqueness of the Holocaust by Wulf Kansteiner
- Uniqueness as denial: the politics of genocide scholarship by David E. Stannard

== See also ==
- Historic recurrence
- Holocaust trivialization
- Historikerstreit
