= American Holocaust: Columbus and the Conquest of the New World =

Book article

- Author: David E. Stannard
- Language: English
- Subject: History of the Americas, colonialism, genocide of indigenous peoples
- Publisher: Oxford University Press
- Publication date: 1992
- Pages: 358
- ISBN: 9780195085570

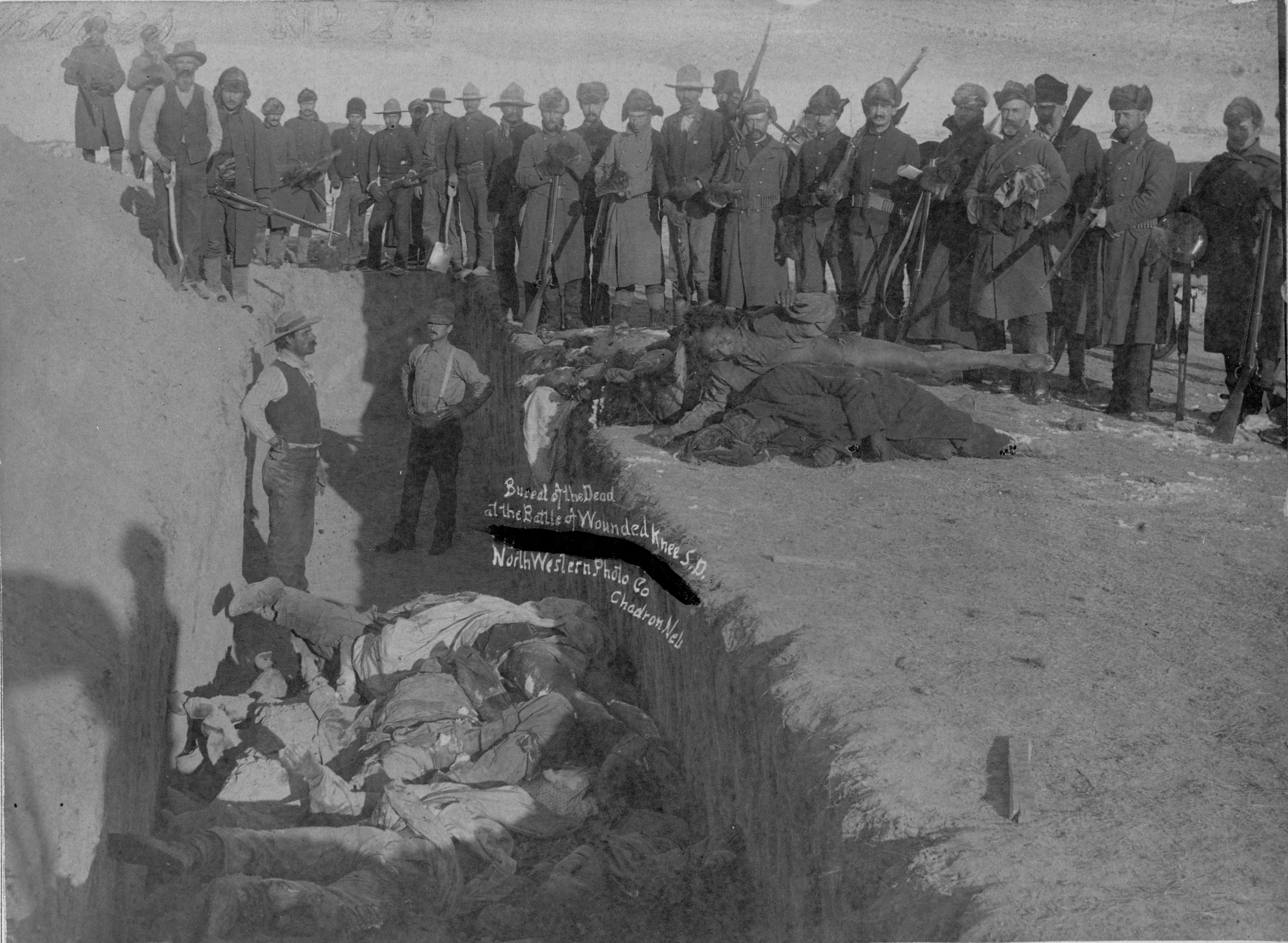
Burial of the dead after the massacre of Wounded Knee. U.S. Soldiers putting Indians in common grave; some corpses are frozen in different positions. South Dakota, USA. 1891.

American Holocaust: Columbus and the Conquest of the New World (Note: Paperback title: American Holocaust: The Conquest of the New World) is a 1992 multidisciplinary book about the Indigenous peoples of the Americas and colonial history written by American scholar and historian David E. Stannard.

This book generated a significant amount of critical commentary. Stannard responded to some of it in an essay titled "Uniqueness as Denial: The Politics of Genocide Scholarship", published in Is the Holocaust Unique?, edited by Alan S. Rosenbaum.

== Summary ==
Stannard begins with a description of the cultural and biological diversity in the Americas prior to contact in 1492. The book surveys the history of European colonization in the Americas, for approximately 400 years, from the first Spanish assaults in the Caribbean in the 1490s to the Wounded Knee Massacre in the 1890s--the indigenous inhabitants of North and South America have suffered dispossession, oppression and exploitation. During that time the indigenous population of the Western Hemisphere declined by as many as 100 million people. The author follows the path of colonialism from the Caribbean to Mexico and Central and South America, then North America to Florida, Virginia, and New England, and finally out across the Great Plains and Southwest to California and the North Pacific Coast. Stannard reveals that wherever Europeans or their descendants went, the native people were caught between imported epidemics and colonialism, typically resulting in the annihilation of 95 percent of their populations.

The author explores the history of ancient European and Christian attitudes toward religion, race, and war, he finds the cultural ground well prepared by the end of the Middle Ages for the centuries-long genocide campaign that Europeans and their descendants launched--and in places continue to wage--against indigenous peoples of the Americas. Stannard suggests that the perpetrators of the American Holocaust drew on the same ideological foundations as did the later architects of the Nazi Holocaust. He writes that the indigenous genocides in the New World were based upon the proposition that American Indians were biologically, racially, and inherently inferior. Thus, the process of “dehumanization” results in sadism and genocide in the personifications of entire peoples (p. 253). It is an ideology of Western supremacy that remains alive today, he adds, and one that in recent years has resulted in American justifications for military interventions overseas.

Stannard concludes that America’s surviving indigenous peoples are still faced with the dilemma going back to 1492. Their choice then was to give up their religion, their lands and culture or suffer further punishment the European colonizers would inflict (p. 258).

== Reception ==
Francis Jennings of Early American Literature wrote:

In essence the book comprises two main features: descriptions of the horrible bloodshed suffered by American Indians as a consequence of European "discovery"; and an explanation of the evolution of European ideas that culminated in the genocide of the title.

Samuel R. Cook of The American Indian Quarterly wrote:

...the author focuses on the genocidal component of the conquest of the Americas, labeling it, "far and away, the most massive act of genocide in the world... American Holocaust is a substantial addition to the library of injustice toward American Natives....From an ethical standpoint, works such as Stannard's are necessary to counterbalance the ethnocentricities of past historical works on Natives...".

Wilbur Jacobs in Journal of American Ethnic History wrote:

"Stannard begins his book with a survey of Indian life and societies throughout the Americans in the era “before Columbus.” With scholarly precision he explores the relevant literature as a basis for evaluating the widespread destruction of American Indian peoples who came in contact with European peoples, especially the Spaniards. His chapters then expand to dramatic accounts of pestilence, genocide, and then to fascinating discussions on sex, race and the holy war against native peoples of the Americas. The main thread of discussion demonstrates that, after the impact of Columbus and his followers, the paths of Europeans and America’s native people were enmeshed in a double disaster of European plagues of disease and savage treatment and atrocities. Stannard estimates that 95 percent of indigenous peoples were annihilated."

Daniel T. Reff from Ohio State University has some praise for the book: "The great strength of this book is the clarification of the many institutional and ideological contingencies that contributed to the American holocaust as well as subsequent genocides".

== See also ==
- Genocide of indigenous peoples
- Population history of Indigenous peoples of the Americas
- White supremacy
- White nationalism
