= Peter C. Mancall =

American historian (born 1959)

- Born: June 18, 1959 (age 67); Philadelphia, Pennsylvania, U.S.
- Occupations: university professor, historian

Peter Mancall (born June 18, 1959) is a professor of history at the University of Southern California whose work has focused on early America, American Indians, and the early modern Atlantic World.

== Biography ==
A 1981 graduate of Oberlin College, Mancall attended graduate school at Harvard University, where he received a Ph.D. in history in 1986, under the supervision of Bernard Bailyn. Mancall was a visiting Assistant Professor of History at Connecticut College from 1986 to 1987. After teaching as a Lecturer in History and Literature at Harvard for two years, he took a position at the University of Kansas in 1989. In 2001, Mancall took a position at the University of Southern California, where he helped to create the USC-Huntington Early Modern Studies Institute in 2003, becoming its first director. He has served on the editorial board of several journals, and from 2007 to 2009 he was Associate Vice Provost for Research Advancement at the University of Southern California. During the 2019-2020 academic year, Mancall served as the Harold Vyvyan Harmsworth Professor of American History at Oxford University. He is currently the Andrew W. Mellon Professor of the Humanities and Professor of History and Anthropology at USC and Divisional Dean for the Social Sciences at USC Dornsife.

Mancall has written six books and edited nine others, and published around forty book reviews in such journals as American Historical Review, Journal of American History, Journal of Economic History, and Journal of the Early Republic. His newest book, The Trials of Thomas Morton: An Anglican Lawyer, His Puritan Foes, and the Battle for a New England, was published by Yale University Press in 2019. Mancall completed Volume 1 of the Oxford History of the United States series, Contested Continent, published in June 2026, covering American colonial history to c. 1680.

Mancall is an elected member of the American Antiquarian Society, as well as a fellow of the Los Angeles Institute for the Humanities and the Royal Historical Society.

== Bibliography ==
- Valley of Opportunity: Economic Culture along the Upper Susquehanna (Ithaca and London: Cornell University Press, 1991)
- Deadly Medicine: Indians and Alcohol in Early America (Ithaca and London: Cornell University Press, paperback 1997)
- At the Edge of Empire: The Backcountry in British North America (with Eric Hinderaker) (Baltimore: Johns Hopkins University Press, 2003)
- Hakluyt's Promise: An Elizabethan's Obsession for an English America (New Haven: Yale University Press, 2007)
- Fatal Journey: The Final Expedition of Henry Hudson—A Tale of Mutiny and Murder in the Arctic (Basic Books, 2009)
- Collecting Across Cultures: Material Exchanges in the Early Modern Atlantic World (with Daniela Bleichmar) (Philadelphia: University of Pennsylvania Press, 2011)
- Nature and Culture in the Early Modern Atlantic (University of Pennsylvania Press, 2017)
- Virginia 1619: Slavery, Freedom, and the Emergence of English America (with Paul Musselwhite and James Horn) (Chapel Hill: University of North Carolina Press, 2019)
- The Trials of Thomas Morton: An Anglican Lawyer, His Puritan Foes, and the Battle for a New England (New Haven: Yale University Press, 2019)
- Contested Continent: The Struggle for North America, c. 1000–1680 (Volume one of the Oxford History of the United States) (New York: Oxford University Press, 2026)
