= Charles C. Mann =

American journalist and author

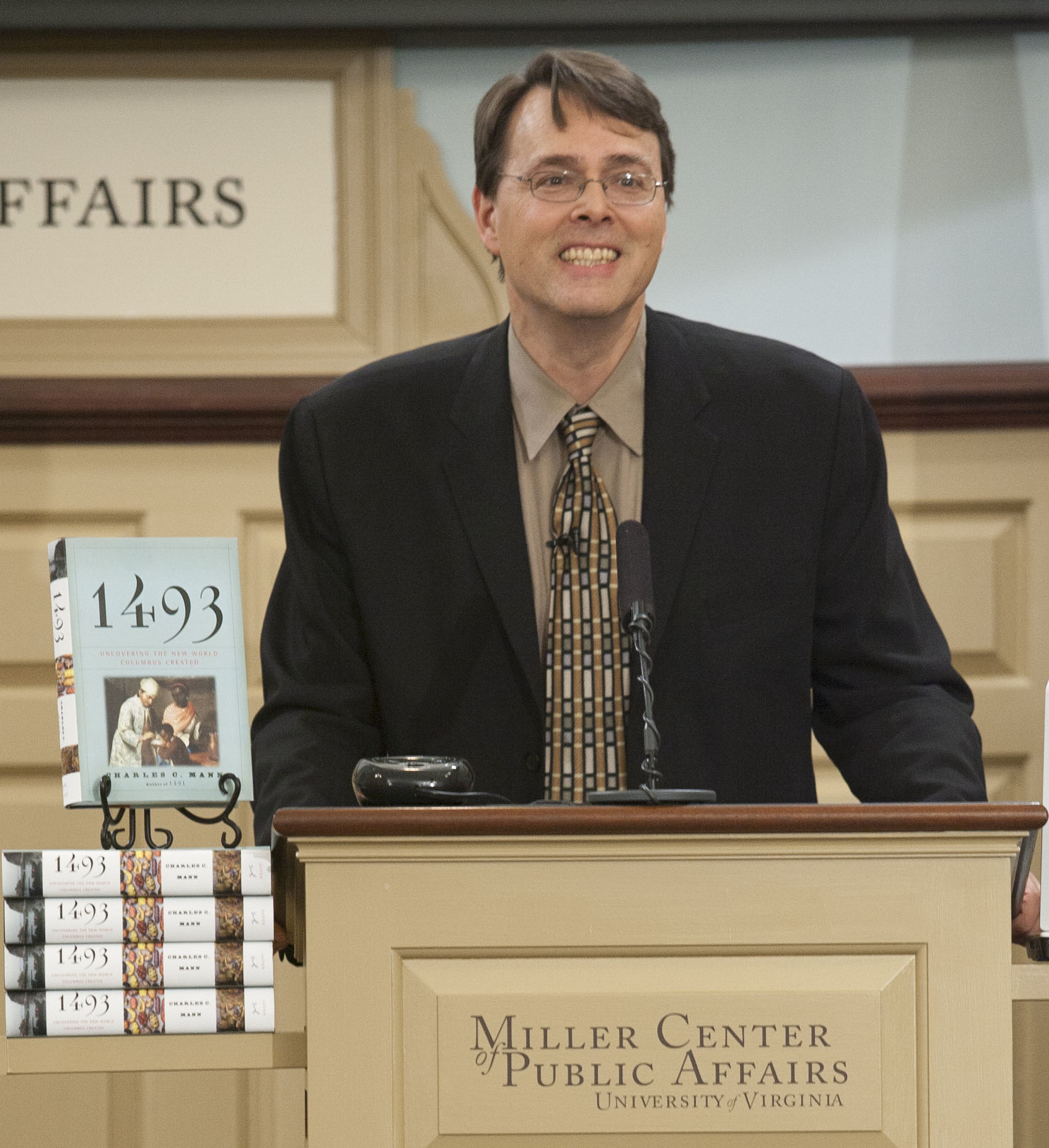
- Charles C. Mann in 2011
- Born: 1955 (age 70–71); United States
- Education: Amherst College
- Occupations: Journalist, author
- Writing career
- Language: English
- Genre: Nonfiction
- Notable works: 1491: New Revelations of the Americas Before Columbus; 1493: Uncovering the New World Columbus Created
- Notable awards: National Academies Communication Award; National Magazine Award (finalist)

Charles C. Mann (born 1955) is an American journalist and author, specializing in scientific topics. In 2006 his book 1491: New Revelations of the Americas Before Columbus won the National Academies Communication Award for best book of the year.

He is the co-author of four books, and contributing editor for Science, The Atlantic Monthly, and Wired.

== Biography ==
Mann was born in 1955 and graduated from Amherst College in 1976. Mann has written for Fortune, The New York Times, Smithsonian, Technology Review, Vanity Fair, and The Washington Post. In 2005 he wrote 1491: New Revelations of the Americas Before Columbus, followed in 2011 by 1493: Uncovering the New World Columbus Created. He served as a judge for the PEN/E. O. Wilson Literary Science Writing Award in 2012. He has also written for the TV series Law & Order.

He is a three-time National Magazine Award finalist and a recipient of writing awards from the American Bar Association, the American Institute of Physics, the Alfred P. Sloan Foundation, and the Lannan Foundation. He lives in Amherst, Massachusetts with his wife and children.

In 2018, Mann published The Wizard and the Prophet, which details two competing theories about the future of agriculture, population, and the environment. The titular "wizard" Mann refers to is Norman Borlaug, the Nobel Peace Prize winner credited with developing the Green Revolution and saving one billion people from starvation. Mann refers to William Vogt, an early proponent of population control, as the "prophet".

== Bibliography ==
=== Books written or co-written by Mann ===
- (with Robert P. Crease) The Second Creation: Makers of the Revolution in Twentieth-Century Physics, 1st ed., New York: Macmillan, 1986; rev. ed., New Brunswick, NJ: Rutgers University Press, 1996
- (with Mark L. Plummer) The Aspirin Wars: Money, Medicine, and 100 Years of Rampant Competition, New York: Alfred A. Knopf, 1991
- (With Peter Menzel and Paul Kennedy) Material World: A Global Family Portrait. San Francisco: Sierra Club Books, 1994.
- (With Mark L. Plummer) Noah’s Choice: The Future of Endangered Species, 1995
- (With David H. Freedman) @ Large: The Strange Case of the World's Biggest Internet Invasion, 1997
- 1491: New Revelations of the Americas Before Columbus, New York: Alfred A. Knopf, 2005
- 1493: Uncovering the New World Columbus Created, Knopf, 2011
  - UK publication: 1493: How the Ecological Collision of Europe and the Americas Gave Rise to the Modern World, Granta Books, 2011
  - Adaptation for children: 1493 for Young People: From Columbus's Voyage to Globalization, Seven Stories Press, 2015.
- Mann, Charles C. (January 2018). The Wizard and the Prophet: Two Remarkable Scientists and Their Dueling Visions to Shape Tomorrow's World. New York: Knopf. ISBN 978-0-307-96169-3.

=== Selected articles by Mann ===
- — (September 2008). "Our Good Earth: The Future Rests on the Soil Beneath Our Feet; Can We Save It?". National Geographic. pp. 80–107.
- — (June 2011). "The Birth of Religion". National Geographic. pp. 34–59. Archived from the original on August 20, 2018.
- — (November 2012). "State of the Species: Does Success Spell Doom for Homo sapiens?". Orion.
- — (January 2018). "The Book That Incited a Worldwide Fear of Overpopulation". Smithsonian.
- — (March 2018). "How Will We Feed the New Global Middle Class?". The Atlantic. Vol. 321, no. 2. Illustrated by Ulises Fariñas. pp. 52–61.
- — "Research in Reverse: When scientists make sharp 180-degree turns in their thinking, it is often for one of two particular reasons", Scientific American, vol. 333, no. 2 (September 2025), pp. 38–42.

=== Reviews of books by Mann ===
- Gross, Terry; Mann, Charles C. (August 8, 2011). "In '1493,' Columbus Shaped a World to Be" (Interview). Fresh Air. NPR.
- Heck, Peter (September 2013). "On Books". Asimov's Science Fiction. Vol. 37, no. 9. pp. 107–111. Review of 1491 and 1493.
- Easterly, William (January 19, 2018). "Review: Going Beyond the Limits of the Earth with 'The Wizard and the Prophet'". The Wall Street Journal.
