= List of ships of the Oceanic Steamship Company =

This is a list of ships in the fleet of the Oceanic Steamship Company, an American shipping company active from 1881 until 1926, when it was acquired by Matson. Some of the early ships in the fleet were built by Matthew Turner and William Cramp & Sons. At least five of the steamers are named after counties in California. Zealandia and the Australia were later added to Oceanic's San Francisco, Australia, and New Zealand mail route. They became the first ocean-going steamships to fly the flag of the Hawaiian Kingdom.

Three of the ships, the Sierra, the Sonoma, and the Ventura, were built to U.S. naval standards, but only the Sierra, the Australia, and the Zealandia were chartered by the United States Armed Forces for use as troopships. The Australia and the Zealandia served in the Spanish–American War and the Sierra in World War I. In addition to the 17 ships under the original company name, 11 other ships sailed under the Oceanic name while operating as a subsidiary of Matson from 1927 until the 1970s.

== Alameda ==
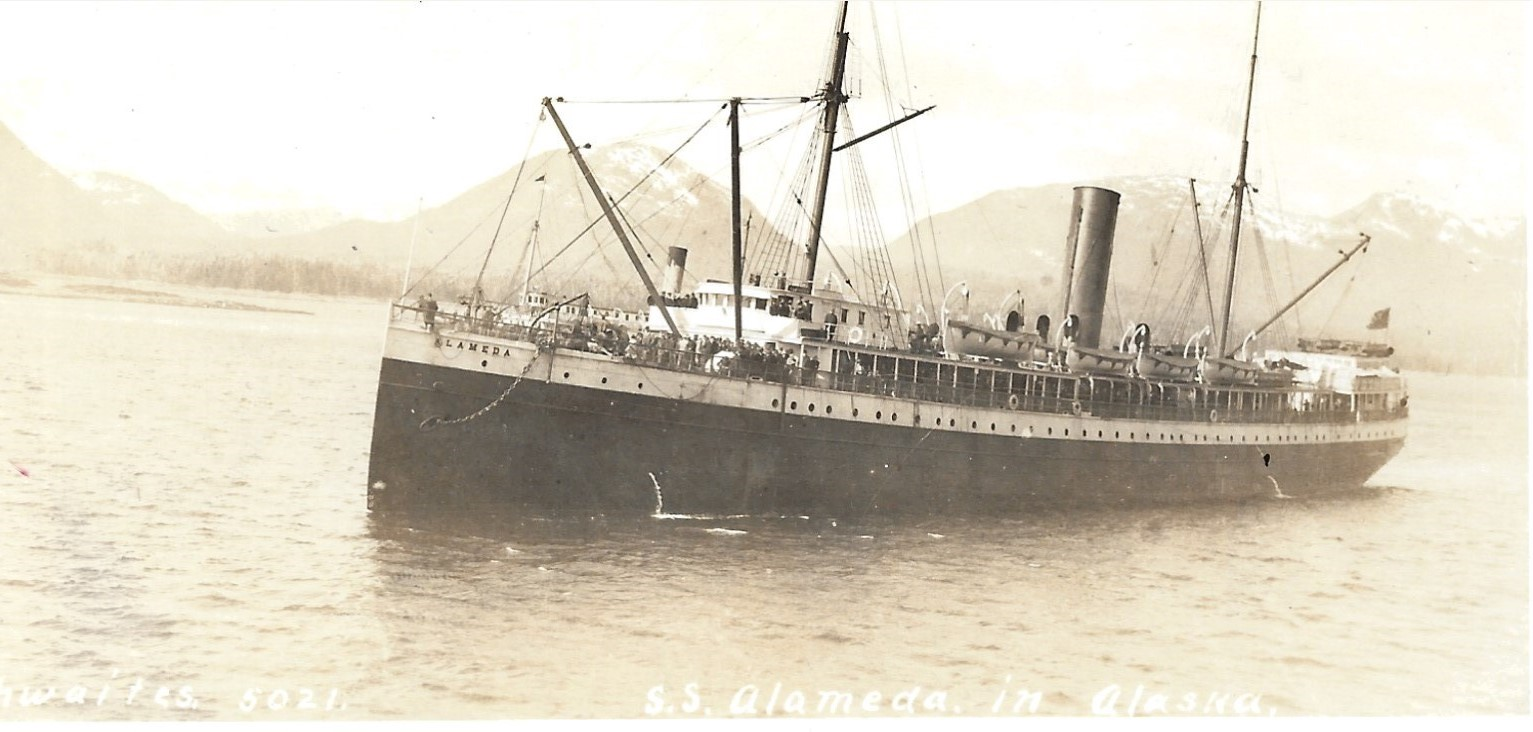
Alameda

Alameda was built by William Cramp & Sons, Philadelphia, Pennsylvania. She was completed in July 1883. Sold in 1910 to the Alaska Steamship Company. Although inspected by the United States Navy during World War I and having the pennant number ID-1432 allocated, she was not taken into service. She was severely damaged by fire at Seattle, Washington, on 28 November 1931 and was consequently scrapped.

== Anna ==
Anna was a wood schooner built in San Francisco in 1881 by Matthew Turner of 239 tons. She was sold to the Pacific Supply Company in 1893. She was lost on Sanak Island in 1901.

== Australia ==
Australia was built by John Elder & Co., Govan, Renfrewshire, United Kingdom as Nova Cambria in 1875 for J. Jameson, W. Pearce and J. F. Ure. Sold in 1878 to Sir William Pearce. Sold in 1886 to W. G. Irwin, Honolulu, Hawaii. She was chartered to Oceanic in 1886 and placed on the American shipping register in 1890. She was charted by the U.S. in 1898 and used as a military transport during the Spanish–American War. During that time, she transported the 1st New York Volunteer Infantry from Honolulu to San Francisco, and the 2nd Oregon Volunteer Infantry from San Francisco to the Philippines. Chartered to the Imperial Russian Government in 1905, she was captured by the Japanese cruiser Suma in November 1905 during the Russo-Japanese War. She was scrapped in Japan in 1912.

== Claus Spreckels ==
Claus Spreckels was a wood brigantine built in San Francisco in 1879 by Matthew Turner of 247 tons. She was wrecked on the Duxbury Reef, north of Bolinas Bay in 1888.

== Consuelo ==
Consuelo was a wood brigantine built in San Francisco in 1880 by Matthew Turner of 293 tons. She was sold to Charles Nelson in 1900, and then to new owners in Mexico in 1902. She was listed in Topolobampo until 1922.

== Emma Augusta ==
Emma Augusta was a barquentine built in 1867 in San Francisco. She was lost in the Gulf of California in 1889.

== John D. Spreckels ==
John D. Spreckels was a wood brigantine built in 1880 by Matthew Turner of 300 tons. Later re-rigged as a schooner for use as a fishing boat in the Bering Strait. She was lost in a collision with the British steamship Statesman in 1913.

== Mariposa ==
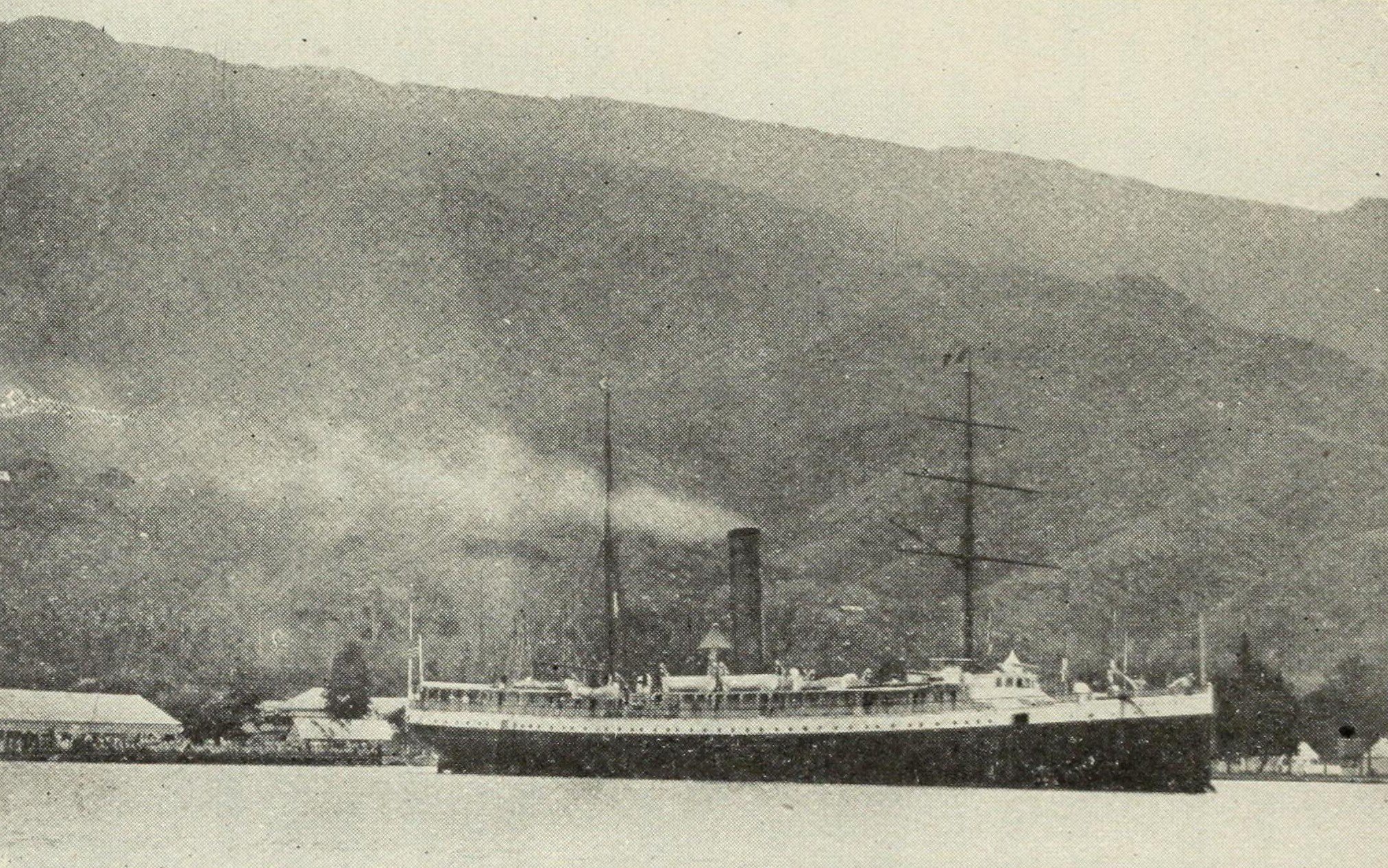
Mariposa

Mariposa was built in 1883 by William Cramp & Sons. She was sold in 1912 to the Alaska Steamship Company. She struck a rock and was wrecked near Point Baker, Alaska, on 18 November 1917.

== Rosario ==
Rosario was a two-masted schooner built in San Francisco in 1879. She was purchased by the Spreckels Brothers in 1882 and transferred to Oceanic. She was sold in 1887.

== Selina ==
Selina was built in 1883. Chartered by Matson Lines Inc. in 1886, she was wrecked at Paukaa, Hawaii, in 1887.

== Sierra ==
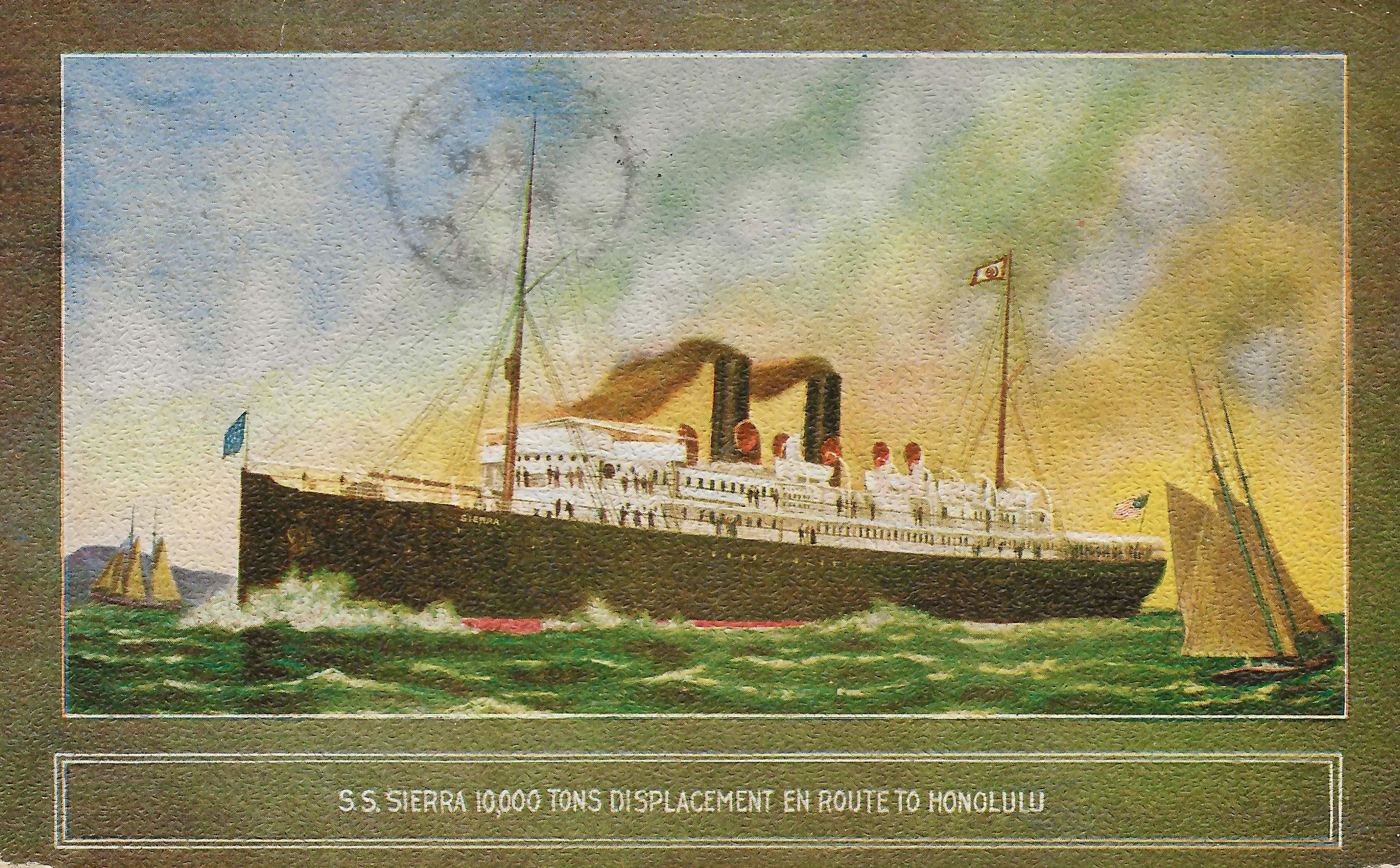
Sierra

Sierra was built in 1900 by William Cramp & Sons. She was requisitioned by the United States Navy on 27 May 1918 and converted to a troopship during World War I. She was commissioned on 1 July and decommissioned on 1 October 1919 and returned to her owners. Sold to the Polish-American Navigation Co. in 1920 and renamed Gdansk. Bought by Oceanic in 1924 and renamed Sierra, she was scrapped in Japan in 1934.

== Sonoma ==
Sonoma was built in 1900. She was scrapped in 1934.

== Suez ==
Suez was built in 1876. She was chartered by Oceanic 1882-83. Later sold to Turkish owners and renamed Hodeidah.

== Ventura ==
Ventura was built in 1900. She was scrapped in 1934.

== W. H. Dimond ==
W. H. Dimond was a wood barquentine built in San Francisco in 1881 by Matthew Turner of 390 tons. She was sold to the Alaska Codfish Co. in 1904. The ship was wrecked in 1914 on Bird Island.

== William G. Irwin ==
William G. Irwin was a wood brigantine built in San Francisco in 1881 by Matthew Turner of 348 tons. She was sold to the Tacome & Roche Harbor Lime Co. The ship was burned at Catalina Island for a film scene in 1926.

== Zealandia ==
Zealandia was built by John Elder & Co. in 1875 for William Pearce. She was chartered by Oceanic in 1886. Sold to W. G. Irvin, Honolulu in 1889 and then to Oceanic in 1893. She was placed on the American register in 1898. She became a troopship that year during the Spanish–American War, transporting part of the 10th Pennsylvania Volunteer Infantry and Utah Light Artillery to the Philippines. She also transported the 1st Tennessee Volunteer Infantry to Manila on the Third Philippine Expedition, and part of the 13th Minnesota Volunteer Infantry and 23rd U.S. Infantry in the Fifth Philippine Expedition. She was returned to Oceanic in 1902. Sold to Charles L. Dimon, New York in 1906. Sold to Fisk Trading Co., New York in 1915 and the United States Mercantile Corporation in 1916. She was wrecked on the Horse Bank, in the River Mersey on 3 April 1917 whilst on a voyage from Liverpool, Lancashire, to New York.

== See also ==
- List of vessels built by Matthew Turner
