= Herbert Eugene Bolton =

American historian (1870-1953)

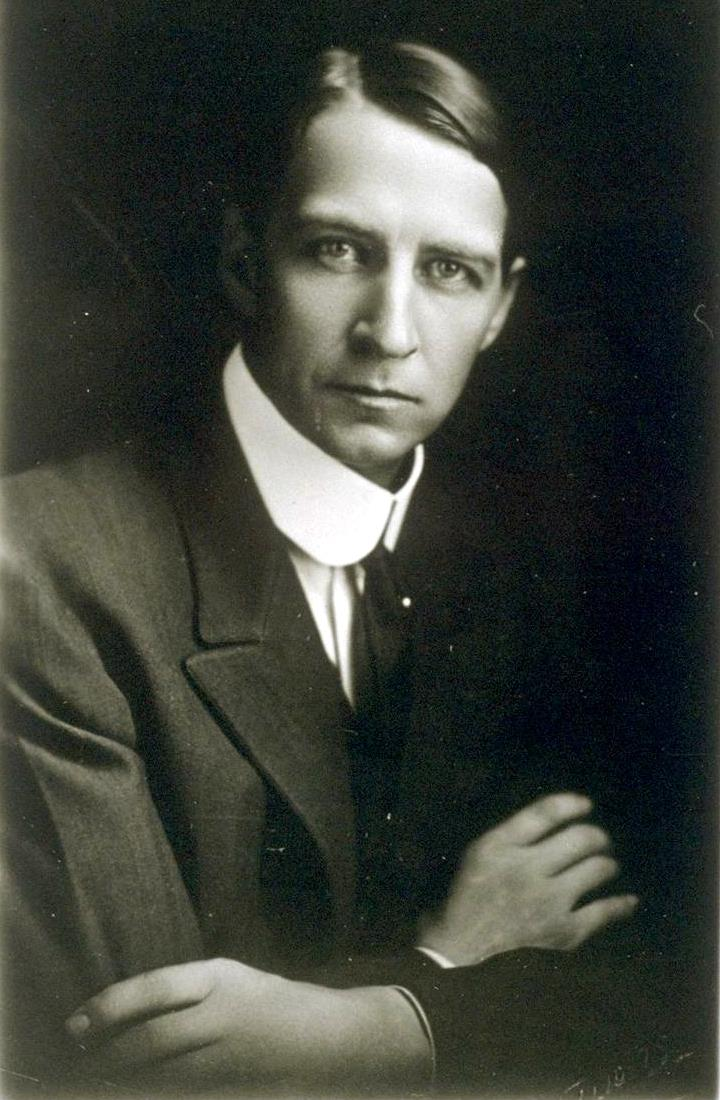
- Bolton in 1905
- Born: 20 July 1870; Monroe County, Wisconsin, U.S.
- Died: 30 January 1953 (aged 82); Berkeley, California, U.S.
- Occupations: Academic, author
- Spouse: Gertrude Janes (m. 1895)

Academic background
- Education: University of Wisconsin–Madison (BA); University of Pennsylvania (PhD)
- Influences: Frederick Jackson Turner

Academic work
- Institutions: Milwaukee State Normal School; University of Texas; University of California, Berkeley
- Notable students: Woodrow Borah, LeRoy R. Hafen, Abraham P. Nasatir, J. Fred Rippy, and Ursula Lamb
- Main interests: Spanish-American borderlands
- Notable works: Guide to Materials for the History of the United States in the Principal Archives of Mexico; New Spain and the Anglo-American West
- Notable ideas: Bolton Theory

Herbert Eugene Bolton (July 20, 1870 – January 30, 1953) was an American historian who pioneered the study of the Spanish-American borderlands and was a prominent authority on Spanish American history. He originated what became known as the Bolton Theory of the history of the Americas which holds that it is impossible to study the history of the United States in isolation from the histories of other American nations, and wrote or co-authored ninety-four works. A student of Frederick Jackson Turner, Bolton disagreed with his mentor's Frontier theory and argued that the history of the Americas is best understood by taking a holistic view and trying to understand the ways that the different colonial and precolonial contexts have interacted to produce the modern United States. The height of his career was spent at the University of California, Berkeley where he served as chair of the history department for twenty-two years and is widely credited with making the renowned Bancroft Library the preeminent research center it is today.

== Early life and education ==
Bolton was born on a farm between Wilton and Tomah, Monroe County, Wisconsin, in 1870 to Edwin Latham and Rosaline (Cady) Bolton. He attended the University of Wisconsin–Madison, where he graduated with a bachelor's degree in 1895. That same year he married Gertrude Janes, with whom he eventually had seven children.

Bolton studied under Frederick Jackson Turner from 1896 to 1897. He was also influenced by Charles Homer Haskins and Richard T. Ely. At University of Wisconsin, his fellow students included Carl Becker and Guy Stanton Ford.

Starting in 1897, Bolton was a Harrison Fellow at the University of Pennsylvania and studied American history under John Bach McMaster. In 1899, he received his Ph.D. from the University of Pennsylvania where he studied under John Bach McMaster, Edward P. Cheyney and Dana C. Munro.

== Career ==
From 1899 to 1901, he was professor of history and economics at Milwaukee State Normal School. From 1901 to 1909, Bolton was a history professor at the University of Texas, where he taught medieval and European history. He became interested in the Spanish colonization of the Americas and in summer 1902 began traveling to Mexico in search of historical documents.

The Carnegie Institution asked Bolton to write a report of information found about United States history in Mexican archives, and the report was published in 1913. Soon afterward, Bolton became an associate editor of the Quarterly of the Texas State Historical Association (now the Southwestern Historical Quarterly).

In 1904, Bolton and Eugene C. Barker published With the Makers of Texas: A Source Reader in Texas History, a textbook. In 1906, Bolton began studying Native Americans in Texas for the Bureau of Ethnology, writing more than 100 articles for the Handbook of American Indians North of Mexico.

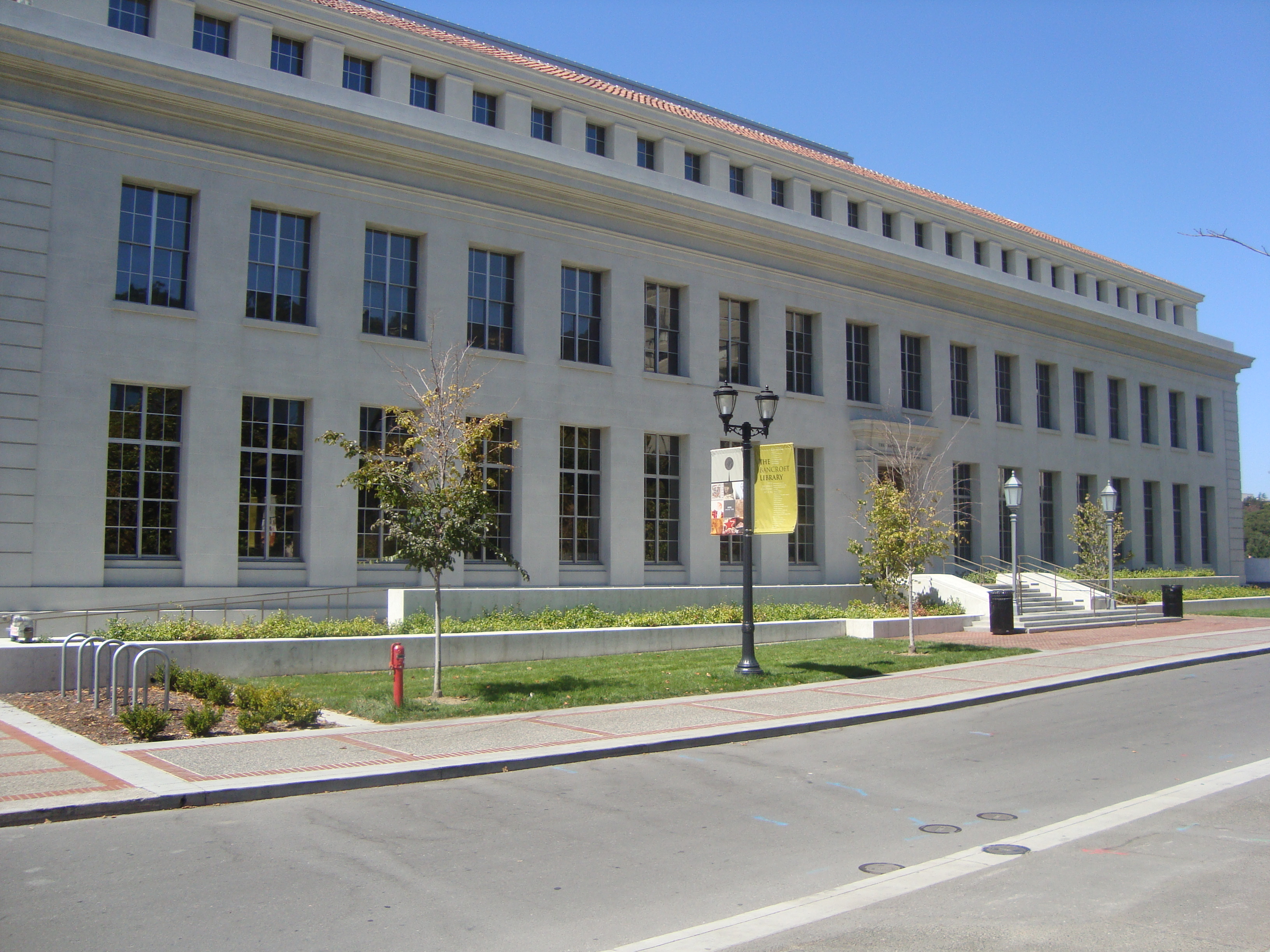
Bancroft Library, University of California, Berkeley

In 1911, Bolton became a professor at the University of California, Berkeley. There he served as the chair of the history department for twenty-two years and became the founding director of the renowned Bancroft Library. In his book The Americas, George P. Hammond noted, “the next twenty years might well be called the Bolton era in historical studies at the University of California.” In his dual capacity as founding director and chairperson, he made Bancroft Library a great research center for American history and elevated his department into a top-ranking position in the historical world. Bolton was involved with the 1918 founding of The Hispanic American Historical Review, the first specialized journal of Latin American history, serving as an advisory editor.

He taught the "History of the Americas" course, which enrolled up to a thousand students. His round-table seminar became famous, and the historians trained in that group have long been known as the “Bolton School.” At Berkeley he supervised more than 300 Masters theses and 104 doctoral dissertations, an all-time record. In 1914, Bolton published Athanase de Mézières and the Louisiana-Texas Frontier, 1768–1780. A year later, Bolton published Texas in the Middle Eighteenth Century: Studies in Spanish Colonial History and Administration. He declined the presidency of the University of Texas.

Over the next twenty-nine years, Bolton published many works, including Texas in the Middle Eighteenth Century (1921), The Spanish Borderlands (1921), Outpost of Empire (1931), Rim of Christendom (1936) and Coronado (1949), for which he received a Bancroft Prize from Columbia University.

Bolton rose to international fame and received numerous honors by the end of his career. The University of California conferred upon him the Sather Professorship in History. Ten colleges and universities of the United States and Canada granted him their highest honorary degrees. Universities in Latin America gave him honorary membership in their faculties. He was made Commander of the Royal Order of Isabella the Catholic in 1925 by the King of Spain. The government of Italy decorated him for his historical work on Father Eusebio Kino. Although Bolton was not a Catholic, Pope Pius XII in 1949 named him Knight of St. Sylvester as recognition for his contribution to the history of the Catholic Church in New Spain.

In 1932, Bolton served as president of the American Historical Association, and his presidential address, "The Epic of Greater America," he laid out his vision of hemispheric history, which has later been called the "Bolton Theory."

In 1937 Bolton examined the recently discovered Drake's Plate of Brass and called it authentic proof that Sir Francis Drake had landed on the California coast in 1579. Later analysis in 1977 demonstrated conclusively that the plate was a forgery. Portland State University archaeologist, Melissa Darby, maintained Bolton knew it was a forgery but took part in a deliberate deception to support his contention that Drake landed somewhere near San Francisco Bay. Between 1929 and 1934 historian E.G.R.Taylor published several articles about Drake with evidence for a more northerly landing in Oregon or Washington, and a new consensus was forming that Drake and his crew in the Golden Hind had landed and spent most of the summer of 1579 in the Pacific Northwest. The new Northwest theory of Drake’s movements was eclipsed when the Drake’s Plate of Brass marking his land claim was found on a hill overlooking San Francisco Bay in 1936. The timing of the discovery of this alleged artifact from Drake was not likely a coincidence. This Plate of Brass was trumped by tHerbert E. Bolton as authentic, and physical proof of Drake’s presence. The plate was only revealed as a fraud in 1977, but by then the Northwest Coast landing theory had been forgotten. Biographer, Albert Hurtado, conceded that Bolton may have been careless in his assessment of the brass plate but doubted that the world-renowned historian would deliberately risk his reputation. The hoax may well have been perpetrated by colleagues of Bolton's, who planted the fake to just to prank him. But the joke went horribly wrong when Bolton mistakenly and publicly authenticated it.

His doctoral students include Woodrow Borah, John W. Caughey, LeRoy R. Hafen, Abraham P. Nasatir, J. Fred Rippy, and Ursula Lamb.

In 1944 retired as a professor at Berkeley. He taught briefly at San Francisco State College in retirement. He died of a stroke in Berkeley, California, in 1953.

== Honors ==
- President, American Historical Association 1932
- Member, American Philosophical Society 1937
- Bolton Hall on the campus of the University of Wisconsin-Milwaukee is named after him. Bolton taught there when it was the Milwaukee State Normal School in the late nineteenth century.
- The Conference on Latin American History, the professional organization of Latin American historians in the U.S., affiliated with the American Historical Association, established the annual Herbert Eugene Bolton Prize for the best book in English on Latin American history.

== Legacy ==
Bolton is best known for his research on Spanish colonial history in the Spanish-American borderlands and his vision of an integrated history of the Americas.

Biographer Kathleen Egan Chamberlain argues:

His writings, particularly The Spanish Borderlands, still challenge traditional views of colonial and frontier history. They raise significant questions, such as the role of frontier on Spanish institutions and Spanish-Indian versus Anglo-Indian relations. The search for common historical elements between North and South America remains an open subject, and the call for greater hemispheric history has yet to be answered. Bolton taught enthusiastically until 1953 when he died at the age of 82, and left hundreds of graduate students, who have expanded Borderlands history and seek to make it relevant to 20th-century history.

In a collection of essays on the development of research and teaching of Latin American history, an entire section, "Bolton, Boltonism, and Neo-Boltonism," was devoted to his work and influence, with nine essays and sixty-six pages devoted to him and his work. His 94 written works are still influential today, especially through the concepts of the Spanish Borderlands and the Bolton Theory. The Bolton Prize of the Conference on Latin American History, the professional organization of Latin American historians, honors the best work in English on Latin American history.

The 1970 publication, The Spanish Borderland Frontier, 1513–1821, by John Francis Bannon (1905–1986), provided a new synthesis of Spanish Borderlands historiography, based on his own work and fifty years of research by other Bolton scholars. Bannon focused on the successful Spanish expansion in New Spain, from eastern Texas westward.

== List of works (Partial) ==
- — (1908). The Native Tribes about the East Texas Missions. Texas State Historical Association.
- Fages, Pedro (1911). Expedition to San Francisco Bay in 1770 (translated and annotated by Herbert Eugene Bolton for publication in 1911). Berkeley: University of California University Press.
- — (1913). Guide to Materials for the History of the United States in the Principal Archives of Mexico. Carnegie Institution of Washington.
- — (1913). New light on Manuel Lisa and the Spanish Fur Trade. The Southwestern Historical Quarterly.
- de Mézières, Athanase (1914). Athanase de Mézières and the Louisiana-Texas Frontier, 1768–1780, Volume I (translated and annotated by Herbert Eugene Bolton for publication in 1914). Cleveland: Arthur H. Clark Company.
- de Mézières, Athanase (1914). Athanase de Mézières and the Louisiana-Texas Frontier, 1768–1780, Volume II (translated and annotated by Herbert Eugene Bolton for publication in 1914). Cleveland: Arthur H. Clark Company.
- — (1915). Texas in the Middle Eighteenth Century: Studies in Spanish Colonial History and Administration. University of California University Press.
- — (1916). Spanish Exploration in the Southwest, 1542–1706. New York: C. Scribner's Sons. edited by Bolton
- — (1916). The Beginnings Of Mission Nuestra Senora Del Refugio. Kessinger Publishing. ISBN 978-0-548-86154-7. republished 2008.
- — (1917). French Intrusions Into New Mexico 1749–1752. MacMillan.
- KINO, Eusebio Francisco (1919) [1705]. Spain in the West: Kino's Historical Memoir of Pimería Alta, A Contemporary Account of the Beginnings of California, Sonora and Arizona, 1682–1711. Vol. I. translated and annotated by Herbert Eugene Bolton. Cleveland: Arthur H. Clark Company.
- KINO, Eusebio Francisco (1919) [1711]. Spain in the West: Kino's Historical Memoir of Pimería Alta, A Contemporary Account of the Beginnings of California, Sonora and Arizona, 1682–1711. Vol. II. translated and annotated by Herbert Eugene Bolton. Cleveland: Arthur H. Clark Company.
- — (1920). The Colonization of North America 1492–1783. Macmillan.
- — (1921). The Spanish Borderlands: A Chronicle of Old Florida and the Southwest. New Haven: Yale University Press.
- — (1925). Spanish resistance to the Carolina Traders in Western Georgia.
- —; Ephraim Douglass Adams (1926). California's Story. Kessinger Publishing LLC.
- — (1926). Palou and His Writings. University of California Press.
- — (1927). Fray Juan Crespi: Missionary Explorer of the Pacific Coast, 1769–1774. University of California Press.
- BOLTON, Herbert Eugene (1927). Rim of Christendom: a biography of Eusebio Francisco Kino, Pacific coast pioneer. University of California Press.
- — (1931). Outpost Of Empire: The Story of the Founding of San Francisco. New York: Alfred A. Knopf.
- — (1932). New Spain and the Anglo-American West.
- — (1935). The Black Robes of New Spain.
- — (1937). Francis Drake's Plate of Brass. CHQ, Vol. 16,1–16.
- — (1949). Coronado, Knight of Pueblos and Plains (reprint ed.). Whittlesey House.
- BOLTON, Herbert Eugene (1932). The Padre on Horseback. a Sketch of Eusebio Francisco Kino S. J. Apostle to the Pimas. Sonora Press.
- — (1968). The Debatable Land: A Sketch of the Anglo-Spanish Contest for the Georgia Country (reprint ed.). Russell & Russell Publishing.

== Notes ==
| Preceded by Carl Lotus Becker | President of the American Historical Association; 1932 | Succeeded by Charles A. Beard |
