= John D. Spreckels =

American newspaper publisher, railway entrepreneur, philanthropist (1853–1926)

John Diedrich Spreckels
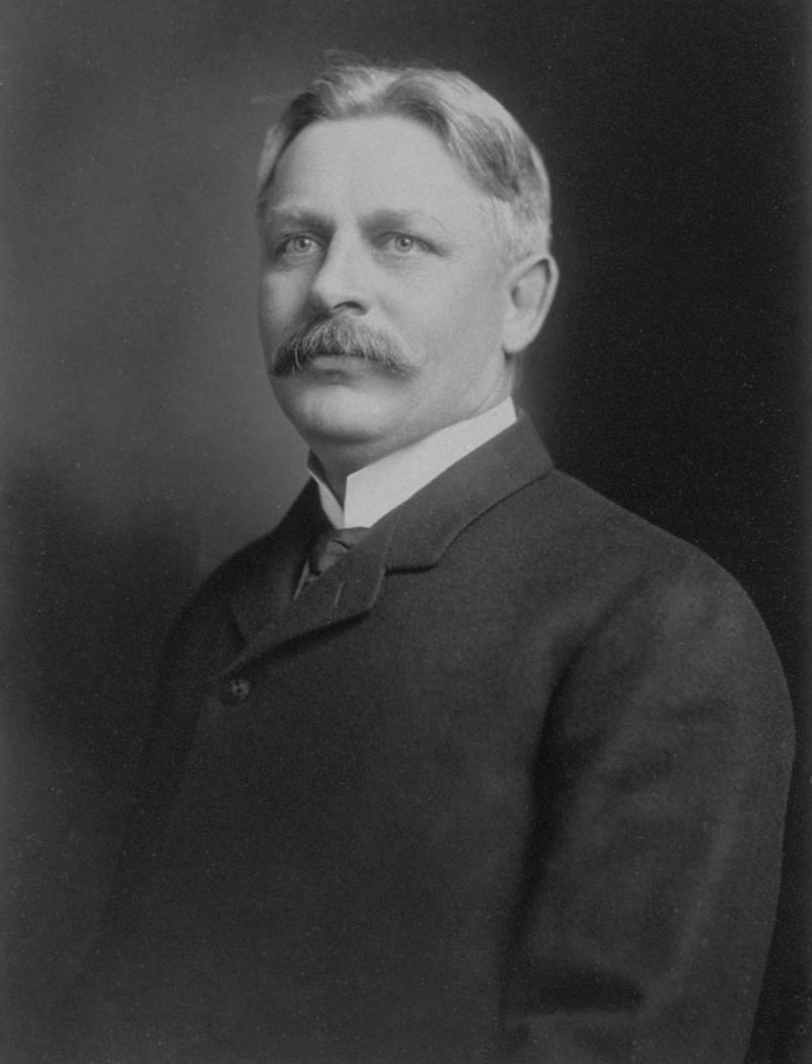
- Spreckels in 1901
- Born: August 16, 1853; Charleston, South Carolina, US
- Died: June 7, 1926 (aged 72); San Diego, California, US
- Spouse(s): Lillie Siebein, 47 years (1877-1924)
- Children: 4
- Parent(s): Claus Spreckels; Anna Christina Mangels
- Relatives: Adolph B. Spreckels, Claus A. Spreckels, Rudolph Spreckels (brothers)

John Diedrich Spreckels (August 16, 1853 – June 7, 1926) was an American businessman who founded a transportation and real estate empire in San Diego, California, in the late 19th and early 20th centuries. He was the son of German-American industrialist Claus Spreckels. His many business ventures included the Hotel del Coronado and the San Diego and Arizona Railway, both of which are credited with helping San Diego develop into a major commercial center.

== Early years ==
The oldest of five children, Spreckels was born in Charleston, South Carolina, though the family soon moved to New York City and then California. Spreckels attended the College of California and then the Polytechnic College in Hanover, Germany, where he studied chemistry and mechanical engineering until 1872. He returned to California and began working for his father, Claus Spreckels, who had grown extremely wealthy in the sugar business. In 1876 he went to the Hawaiian Islands, where he worked for his father's sugar business, the Hawaiian Commercial and Sugar Company.

=== Entrepreneur beginnings ===
In 1880, with $2 million in capital, he organized the company J. D. Spreckels and Brothers, to establish trade between the mainland United States and the Hawaiian Islands. The company began with one sailing vessel, the Rosario, and later controlled two large fleets of sail and steam ships. The firm also engaged extensively in sugar refining, and became agents for leading sugarcane plantations in Hawaii. Much of the development of commercial interests between the United States and Hawaii is due to this firm.

The shipping and passenger line of this enterprise was the Oceanic Steamship Company, founded by J.D. Spreckels in 1881. Its inaugural service was between California and Hawaii, and later from California to Australia, New Zealand, Samoa and Tahiti. The ships transported passengers, sugar, freight, and provided mail service. In 1926, Oceanic became a subsidiary of Matson Navigation Company. Prior to its becoming associated with Matson, Oceanic owned a fleet of at least 17 ships.

In October 1877, John Diedrich Spreckels married Lillie Siebein (1855–1924) in Hoboken, New Jersey, and together they had four children: Grace (1878–1937), Lillie (1880–1965), John (1882–1921), and Claus (1888–1935). They first lived in the Kingdom of Hawaii and then in San Francisco. In 1887, Spreckels visited San Diego on his yacht Lurline to take on supplies. Impressed by the real estate boom then taking place, he invested in the construction of a wharf and coal bunkers at the foot of Broadway (then called "D" Street). That boom soon ended, but Spreckels's interest in San Diego would last for the rest of his life.

He acquired control of the Coronado Beach Company, Hotel del Coronado and Coronado Tent City; he bought the San Diego street railway system, changing it from horse power to electricity, in 1892. Hotel del Coronado was owned by the Coronado Beach Company which was originally capitalized with US$3 million. At the time of capitalization the original company directors were E.S. Babcock, John D. Spreckels, Captain Charles T. Hinde, H.W. Mallett, and Giles Kellogg. The Coronado Beach Company was responsible for numerous other investments in the Coronado, California, area. Before investing in the Coronado Beach Company, Spreckels waited for his close friend Captain Hinde to join him. They jointly invested and managed new businesses.

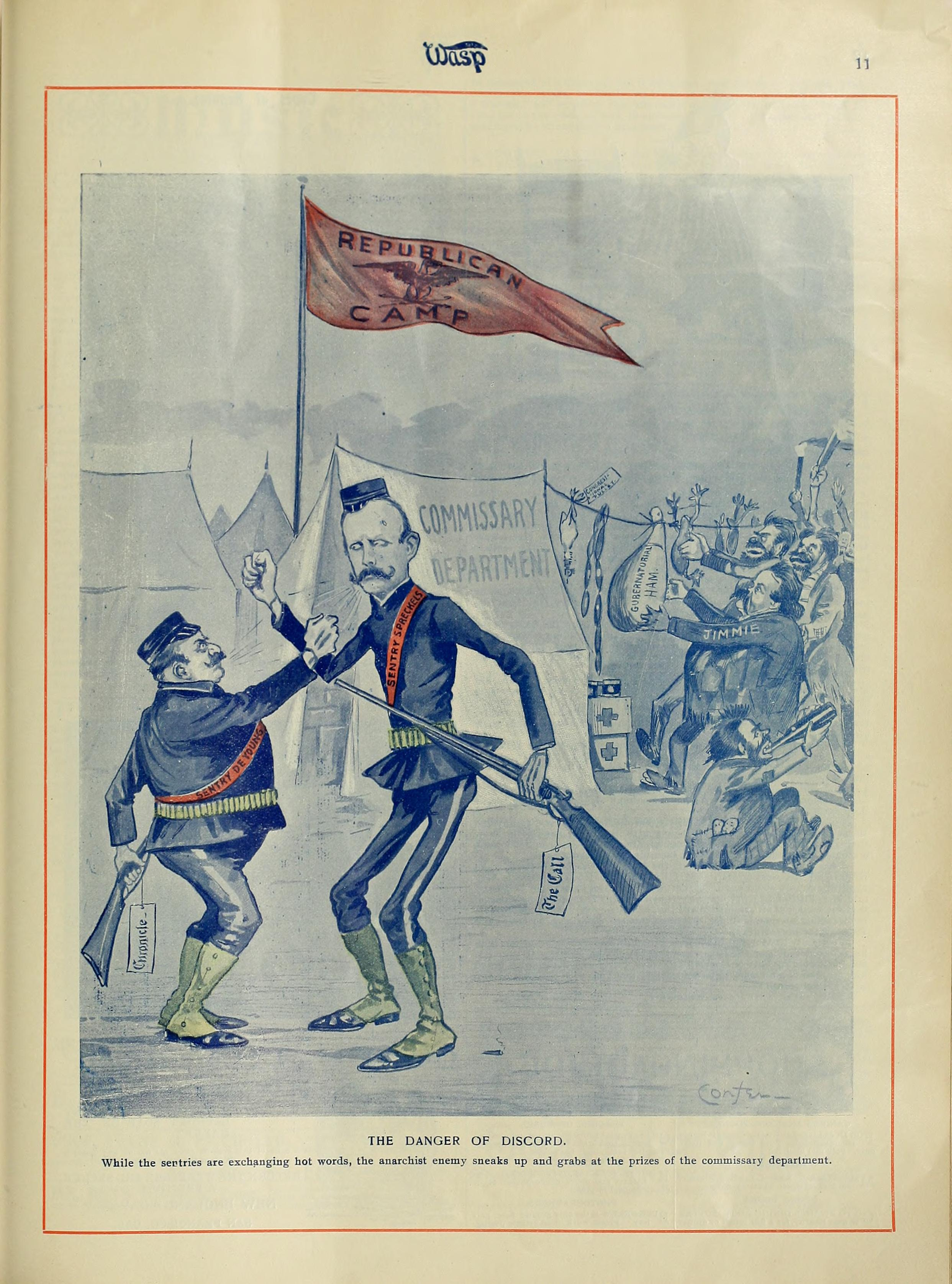
"The Danger of Discord", a political cartoon by C. H. Confer published in The Wasp mocking Spreckels and fellow Republican newspaperman M. H. de Young for their infighting, insinuating it would lead to the election of Democrat James G. Maguire as Governor of California, September 24, 1898

For a time, Spreckels was owner of the San Francisco Call, then a morning newspaper. While still living in San Francisco, he invested in San Diego newspapers, buying The San Diego Union in 1890 and the San Diego Evening Tribune in 1901. He moved his family permanently to San Diego immediately after the 1906 San Francisco earthquake.

== Relocation to San Diego ==
In the next decades, Spreckels became a millionaire many times over, and the wealthiest man in San Diego. At various times he owned all of Coronado Island, the San Diego-Coronado Ferry System, the Union-Tribune Publishing Co., the San Diego Electric Railway, the San Diego & Arizona Railway, and Belmont Park in Mission Beach. He built several downtown buildings, including the Union Building in 1908, Spreckels Theatre in 1912, the Hotel San Diego, and the Golden West Hotel. He employed thousands of people and at one time paid 10% of all the property taxes in San Diego County.

Spreckels was president of several companies, including the Oceanic Steamship Company, operating a mail and passenger line to Hawaii and Australia, the Western Sugar Refining Company, the Coronado Water Company, the San Diego and Coronado Ferry Company, the San Diego and Coronado Transfer Company, the Pajaro Valley Consolidated Railroad Company, the San Diego Electric Railway, and the San Diego & Arizona Railway Company.

=== Spreckels Mansion ===
Spreckels's first permanent residence in the San Diego area was the Spreckels Mansion, located at 1630 Glorietta Boulevard. The mansion sat on five acres of land overlooking Glorietta Bay across from the Hotel del Coronado. In 1906, Spreckels, then 53, contracted architect Harrison Albright (1866–1932) to design and build the Mansion. The building, designed with the simple, classic lines of the Italian Renaissance, was completed in 1908 with six bedrooms, three baths, a parlor, dining room and library at the cost of $35,000. At that time, Spreckels Mansion featured a brass cage elevator, a marble staircase with leather-padded handrails, skylights, marble floors and some of the island's most spectacular gardens. The home was built with reinforced steel and concrete, an earthquake precaution Spreckels insisted upon after living through the 1906 San Francisco earthquake. Spreckels lived in the mansion until his death in 1926. It is now a popular boutique hotel, the Glorietta Bay Inn.

Spreckels built a beach house at 1043 Ocean Boulevard in Coronado, also designed by Albright, for his son Claus as a wedding present in 1910; Claus's widow, Ellis, lived there until her death in 1967. The beach house was the location of the 2011 accidental death of 6-year-old Max Shacknai, son of Jonah Shacknai, former CEO of Medicis Pharmaceutical, and the contested suicide of Jonah Shacknai's girlfriend, Rebecca Zahau.

== Transportation and infrastructure ==
=== San Diego Electric Railway ===
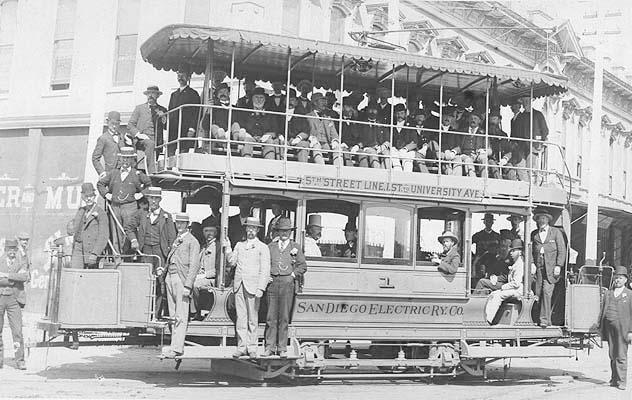
SDERy double-decker Car No. 1 pauses at the intersection of 5th Street & Market Street in San Diego during its inaugural run on September 21, 1892.

The San Diego Electric Railway (SDERy) was a San Diego–based, light rail mass transit system founded by Spreckels in 1892. Spreckels's strategy involved buying up several failed downtown horse- and cable-drawn trolley routes, consolidating and standardizing the trackage, and electrifying the resulting unified street railway system.

Over the years, the SDERy constructed new lines to connect San Diego's burgeoning downtown with the region's up-and-coming outlying communities, including Mission Beach, Pacific Beach, and Normal Heights (developments where Spreckels owned the bulk of the land). Spreckels's underlying philosophy in this regard can best be summed up as follows:

"Before you can hope to get people to live anywhere ... you must first of all show them that they can get there quickly, comfortably, and above all, cheaply. Transportation determines the flow of population."

At its peak, the SDERy's routes would operate throughout greater San Diego over some 165 miles (266 kilometers) of track. And though the system had operated continuously for more than half a century, declining ridership (due in large part to the increasing usage of the automobile) ultimately led the company to discontinue all streetcar service in favor of bus routes in 1949.

=== San Diego Class 1 Streetcars ===
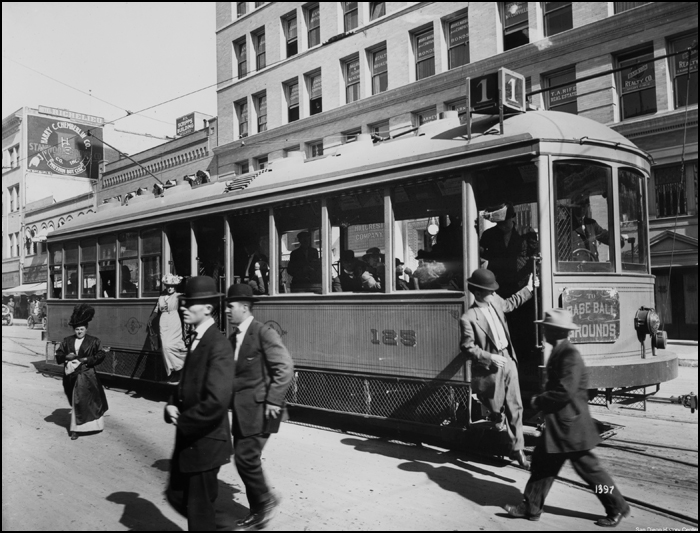
Class 1 Streetcar #125 at 5th and Broadway in San Diego, CA (1915)

One of Spreckels's major contributions to the city of San Diego was his commitment to the construction of Balboa Park in preparation of the Panama–California Exposition. As the owner of the San Diego Electric Railway Company, he also developed a unique fleet of special streetcars that could handle the large crowds attending this event. Following the Exposition, the Class 1 streetcars would go on to provide a continuing public transportation service for the city of San Diego over the next 27 years.

An evolution from previous streetcar models, the Class 1s were designed with artistry, state-of-the-art technology and San Diego's unique climate in mind. Under Spreckels's guidance, the engineers of SDERy drafted up plans that took elements from both the "California Car" and the "Closed Car" designs and refashioned them into a new, modern transit fleet. Their plans were sent to the Saint Louis Car Company (SLCCo) where these beautiful Arts & Crafts-style streetcars were built and shipped out to San Diego. Ultimately, the Class 1 streetcars ran all over San Diego, from Coronado through Downtown, Mission Hills, Ocean Beach, North Park, Golden Hill, and Kensington. They even briefly served as a link to the U.S.-Mexico border.

These streetcars were retired in 1939 in favor of the cheaper Depression-era Presidents’ Conference Committee (PCC) streetcars. Today, only three of the original twenty-four Class 1 streetcars remain in existence.

=== San Diego and Arizona Railway ===
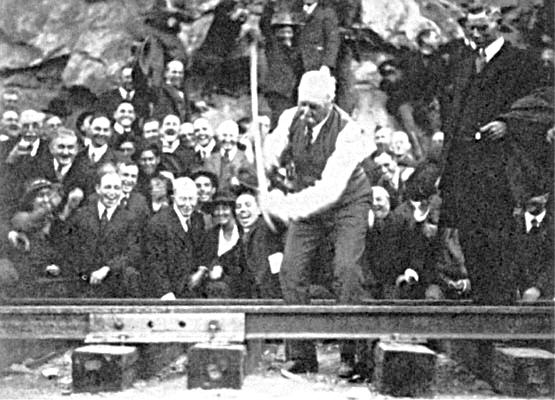
J.D. Spreckels drives the "golden spike" to ceremonially complete the San Diego and Arizona Railway on November 15, 1919.

In 1919, Spreckels completed the San Diego and Arizona Railway, a short line American railroad, dubbed "The Impossible Railroad" by many engineers of its day due to the immense logistical challenges involved. Established in 1906 to provide San Diego with a direct rail link to the east by connecting in El Centro, California, with lines of the Southern Pacific Railroad (which secretly provided the funding for the endeavor), the 148-mile (238-kilometer) route of the SD&A originated in San Diego and terminated in the Imperial County town of Calexico.

The total construction cost was approximately $18 million (equivalent to $243 million in 2024), or some $123,000 per mile ($1.7 million in 2024); the original estimate was $6 million. Construction delays, attacks by Mexican revolutionaries, and government intervention during World War I all served to push the construction completion to November 15, 1919, when the "golden spike" was finally driven by Spreckels himself. Completing the SD&A was a monumental task that seriously affected Spreckels's health, almost costing him his life.

In subsequent years, damage to the lines from heavy rainstorms, landslides, and fires took a financial toll on the railroad, as did border closings with Mexico. In 1932, financial difficulties forced Spreckels's heirs to sell their interests in the firm for $2.8 million to the Southern Pacific, which renamed the railroad the San Diego and Arizona Eastern Railway (SD&AE).

=== Southern California Mountain Water Company ===
"Get your water first, for without your water you get your population under false pretenses and they quit you when the water runs dry."

Spreckels organized the Southern California Mountain Water Company, which in turn built the Morena and the Upper and Lower Otay Reservoir dams, the Dulzura conduit and the necessary pipeline to the city. The company was acquired by the City of San Diego.

=== Early automobile enthusiast ===
Speckels was noted as one of the West Coast's "most prominent and enthusiastic automobilists." When California began requiring license plates in 1905, Spreckels acquired the first five plates for himself and his family.

== Free speech fight ==
A conflict ensued between Spreckels and the labor movement from 1911 until 1913, as part of what was known as the San Diego free speech fight. The Wobblies and city authorities faced off in the working class neighborhood of Stingaree. Vigilantes attacked the protesters and the neighborhood was eventually razed to the ground. State investigator Harris Weinstock and the San Francisco Bulletin alleged that Spreckels was on the side of the vigilantes and encouraged their behavior.

== Death and legacy ==
Spreckels died on June 7, 1926, in Coronado, San Diego, and was buried at Cypress Lawn Memorial Park in Colma. Biographer Austin Adams called him "one of America's few great Empire Builders who invested millions to turn a struggling, bankrupt village into the beautiful and cosmopolitan city San Diego is today."

Spreckels contributed to the cultural life of the city by building the Spreckels Theatre in San Diego, the first modern commercial playhouse west of the Mississippi. He gave generously to the fund to build the 1915 Panama-California Exposition and, together with his brother Adolph B. Spreckels, donated the Spreckels Organ Pavilion in Balboa Park to the people of San Diego just before the opening of the Exposition. Spreckels paid the salaries of a resident organ tuner and of the organist for many years, providing free daily organ concerts.

Both Spreckels Elementary School in San Diego and Spreckels Park in Coronado, California, are named for him.
