= LeRoy R. Hafen =

American historian (1893–1985)

- Authors LeRoy R. Hafen and Ann Hafen in 1960
- Born: LeRoy Reuben Hafen; December 18, 1893; Bunkerville, Nevada, U.S.
- Died: March 8, 1985 (aged 91); Palm Desert, California, U.S.
- Parent(s): John George Hafen; Mary Ann Stucki

LeRoy Reuben Hafen (December 8, 1893 – March 8, 1985) was a historian of the American West and a Latter-day Saint. For many years he was a professor of history at Brigham Young University (BYU).

== Biography ==
He was born on December 8, 1893, in Bunkerville, Nevada, to John George Hafen, a polygamist, and Mary Ann Stucki. He attended high school in Cedar City, Utah, for two years and then at the St. George Stake Academy (now Utah Tech University) in St. George, Utah. It was in St. George that Hafen met his wife, Ann Woodbury. They were married on 3 September 1915 in the St. George Temple. He received his bachelor's degree from Brigham Young University. After this he taught school in Bunkerville and then was the principal of Virgin Valley High School. He then pursued graduate studies receiving his master's degree from the University of Utah, writing his dissertation on the Mormon handcart pioneers, and then received his Ph.D. from the University of California, Berkeley. At Berkeley Hafen studied under Herbert E. Bolton.

For 30 years, from 1924 until 1954, Hafen was the Colorado State Historian, and then he taught at BYU for 17 years. While Colorado State Historian Hafen was also the director of the Colorado State Museum and editor of the Colorado Magazine. He also worked as a history professor at the University of Denver. Among other projects as State Historian Hafen oversaw was a diorama of the city of Denver funded through federal work aid projects. In 1947 Hafen served as a visiting professor at the University of Glasgow and in 1949-1950 he has a fellowship at the Huntington Library. Hafen was one of the founders of the Western History Association.

Hafen taught both American and Latin American history at BYU. He and his wife donated a collection of 3000 books and 2000 pamphlets.

Among books by Hafen were the history of Colorado, The Indians of Colorado, Handcarts to Zion, Broken Hand: The Life of Thomas Fitzpatrick and a large collection of books on Mountain Men and the fur trade. Hafen edited the collection entitled The Mountain Men and the Fur Trade of the Far West which had 292 biographies by at least 20 different authors. Among the authors whose work appeared in these volumes edited by Hafen were David J. Weber, Abraham P. Nasatir and Carl P. Russell. Hafen also edited Volumes 9, 10 and 11 of the Southwest Historical Series. Hafen also edited (along with his wife Ann) the 14 volume collection of primary sources The Far West and the Rockies, 1820-1875 which was the leading publication of the Arthur H. Clark Company during the 1950s and for the editing of which Arthur H. Clark Jr. had specifically recruited Hafen.

Hafen's book Broken Hand: The Life of Thomas Fitzpatrick involved him in a complex set of interactions to bring it to publication. He originally co-authored it with W. J. Gent with the intent of having it published as a popular history. With the advent of the Great Depression Gent was not able to sell the manuscript. In the summer of 1930 Hafen taught at the University of Colorado and also joined with John Van Male in the formation of The Old West Publishing Company, with the two of them as partners in the business. This ended up being the only book published by the company. Hafen also wrote with Carl C. Rister Western America (1941) which was a text-book on the history of the Trans-Mississippi west in the United States and through 1960 was the only textbook with this as its primary focus.

Among articles of note by Hafen were "The Old Spanish Trail, Santa Fe to Los Angeles" in Huntington Library Quarterly Vol. 11, No. 2, Feb. 1948, p. 149-160.

Many of Hafen's books were written in cooperation with his wife. This included the 15 volume series called the Far West and the Rockie Mountains. The Hafens were the parents of two children.

Ann died in 1970 of cancer. In 1971 Hafen married her widowed sister Mary. He died on March 8, 1985, in Palm Desert, California.

== Legacy ==
Hafen's book The Overland Mail, 1849-1869 was republished in 2004 by the University of Oklahoma Press with a foreword by David Dary.

The Colorado Historical Society gives out a LeRoy R. Hafen award.
