= SS Sierra (1900) =

Passenger steamboat and troopship

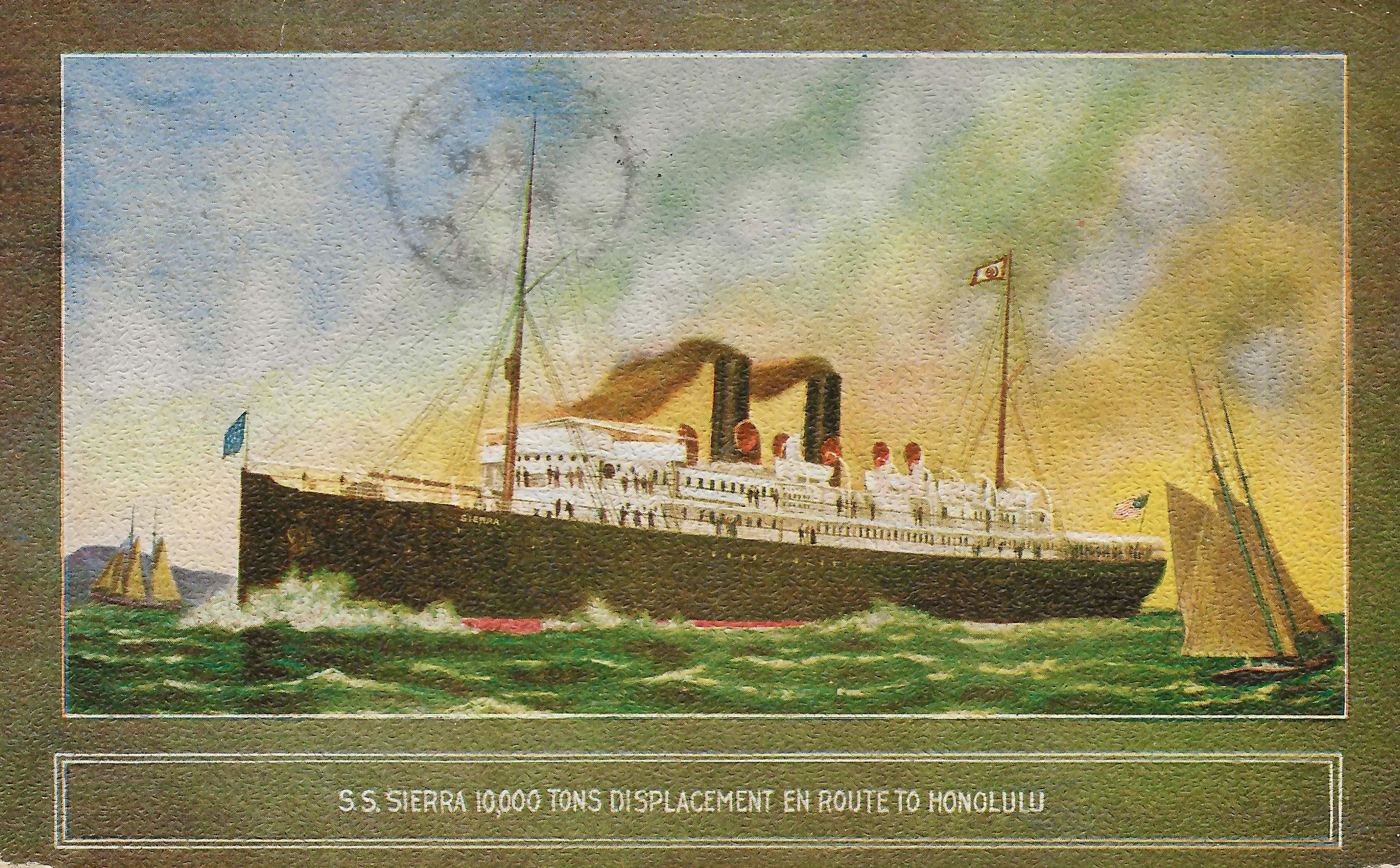
- SS Sierra en route to Honolulu, Hawaii Territory.

History
- Name: Sierra; Gdansk
- Owner: Oceanic Steamship Company
- Port of registry: (United States) San Francisco
- Launched: 29 May 1900
- Fate: Broken up 1934

United States
- Name: USS Sierra
- Namesake: Sierra Nevada mountain range (previous name retained)
- Acquired: 27 May 1918
- Commissioned: 1 July 1918
- Decommissioned: 1 October 1919
- Stricken: 1 October 1919
- Fate: Returned to owners 1 October 1919

General characteristics
- Type: Passenger ship
- Tonnage: 5,989 GRT
- Displacement: 9,680 long tons (9,840 t) (normal)
- Length: 416 ft 0 in (126.80 m)
- Beam: 50 ft 2 in (15.29 m)
- Draft: 24 ft 0 in (7.32 m) (mean)
- Depth: 25 ft 11 in (7.90 m)
- Propulsion: 2 × triple expansion steam engines
- Speed: 17 knots (31 km/h; 20 mph)
- Sensors & processing systems: Wireless direction finding

General characteristics in US Navy service
- Type: Troop transport
- Tonnage: 5,989 GRT
- Displacement: 9,680 long tons (9,840 t) (normal)
- Length: 416 ft 0 in (126.80 m)
- Beam: 50 ft 2 in (15.29 m)
- Draft: 24 ft 0 in (7.32 m) (mean)
- Depth: 25 ft 11 in (7.90 m)
- Propulsion: Steam
- Speed: 16 knots (30 km/h; 18 mph)
- Complement: 284
- Armament: 4 × 6 in (152 mm) guns; 2 × 1-pounder guns; 2 × machine guns

SS Sierra was a steamship launched in 1900. It served as a passenger ship from 1900 to 1918, completing its 100th voyage between San Francisco and Honolulu in March 1914. In 1918, during World War I, the United States Navy acquired the ship and it served as a troopship as the USS Sierra (ID-1634). It was decommissioned from naval service in 1919, and was later renamed SS Gdansk.

== Description ==
The steamer had a double bottom, watertight compartments, two sets of triple-expansion steam engines developing over 8,000 horsepower (6,000 kW), and twin screws capable of driving the vessel over 17 knots (31 km/h; 20 mph). Sierra had a bilge keel and Wireless equipment. The vessel had accommodations for first class, second class and "between decks" passengers. The ship was the first of a series of three to be built for the line with the others being Sonoma and Ventura.

The vessel measured 416 ft 0 in (126.80 m) long with a beam of 50 ft 2 in (15.29 m), a mean draft of 24 ft 0 in (7.32 m) and a depth of hold of 25 ft 11 in (7.90 m). The ship was assessed at 5,989 gross register tons (GRT) and had a normal displacement of 9,680 long tons (9,840 t). In United States Navy service, the ship was armed with four 6-inch (152 mm) guns, two 1-pounder guns and two machine guns and had a complement of 284.

== Construction and career ==
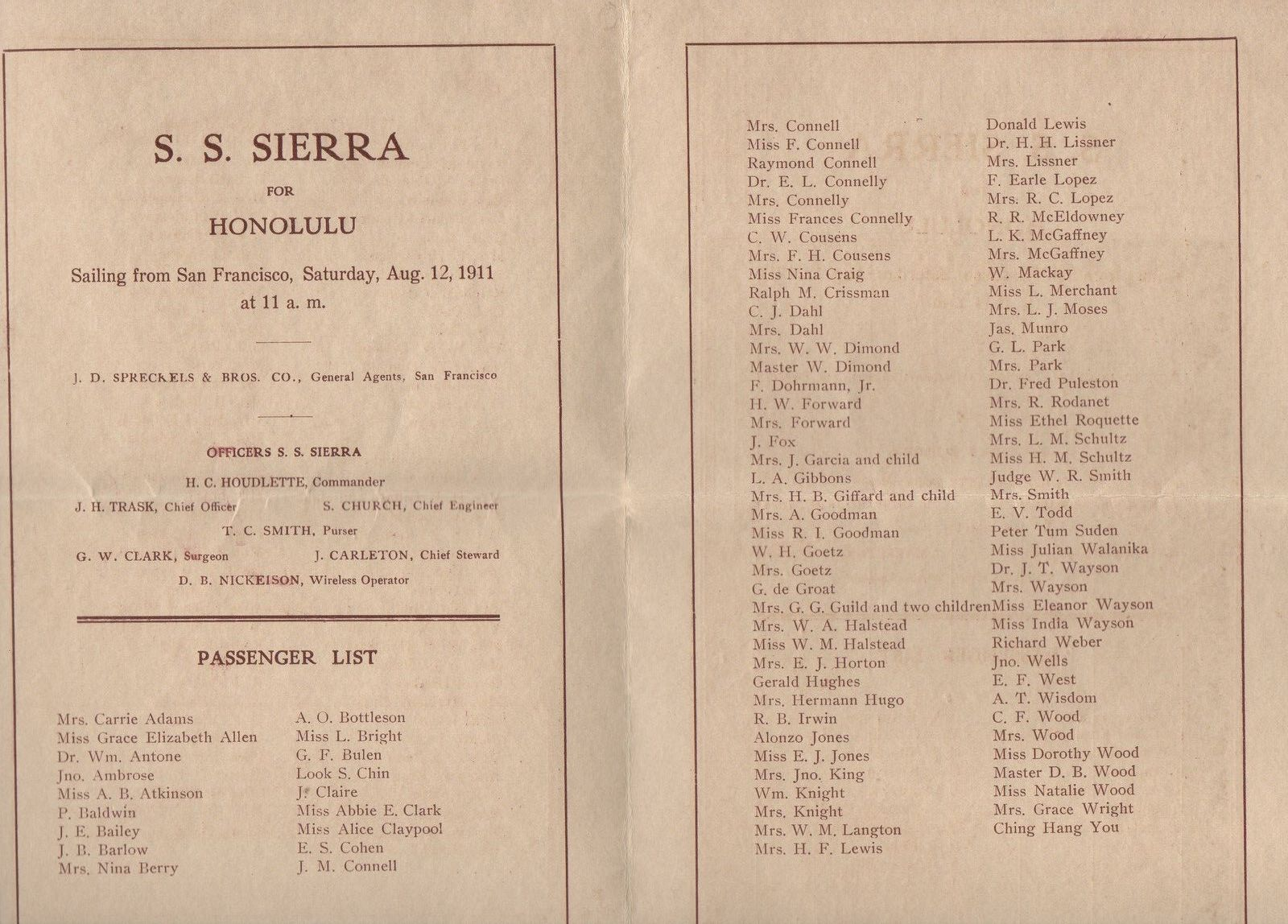
Inside passenger list for departure from San Francisco, California, on 12 August 1911, of the Oceanic Steamship Co.'s steamer Sierra.

=== As a passenger ship ===
Sierra was constructed as a commercial passenger ship that was launched on 29 May 1900 by William Cramp & Sons in Philadelphia for the Oceanic Steamship Company. After entering service, the ship was assigned to the San Francisco to Australia service via Hawaii. The ship was one of three to be built for the Australia route in 1900-1901, including the Sonoma and Ventura. Sierra made 40 visits to Honolulu in the Australian service. Captain H. C. Houdlette was in command of the vessel. In 1909, Sierra was overhauled for service between San Francisco and Honolulu. She took the place of the steamer Alameda. Sierra operated between San Francisco and Honolulu for Oceanic. Sierra was a favorite honeymoon ship for passengers wanting to travel from California to Honolulu, Hawaii. Sierra completed its 100th voyage between San Francisco and Honolulu on 2 March 1914.

=== As a navy ship ===
The United States Navy acquired her from the John D. Spreckel Brothers Company on 27 May 1918 for use as a troop transport during World War I and assigned her the identification number 1634. After conversion work was complete, she was commissioned as USS Sierra (ID-1634) on 1 July 1918. Sierra was assigned to transatlantic service upon commissioning, and she transported troops from the United States to France until the end of World War I on 11 November 1918. After the war, she engaged in the reverse process of bringing American troops home from Europe for another eleven months. Sierra was decommissioned on 1 October 1919. On the same day, her name was stricken from the Navy list and she was returned to her owners.

=== Sale and later career ===
In 1934, Yuji Kimoto of Osaka, Japan, bought the ship from the Oceanic Steamship Company for the price of $59,500. As SS Sierra, the ship returned to commercial passenger service. She was later renamed SS Gdansk.

== Sources ==
- "Sierra I (Id. No. 1634)". Dictionary of American Naval Fighting Ships. Navy Department, Naval History and Heritage Command.
- Marine Engineering (July 1900). "Launches—Home and Foreign". Marine Engineering. 5 (July 1900). New York: Aldrich & Donaldson.
- Marine Engineering (September 1900). "Launches—Home and Foreign". Marine Engineering. 5 (September 1900). New York: Aldrich & Donaldson.
- "Naval History and Heritage Command Online Library of Selected Images: U.S. Navy Ships -- USS Sierra (ID # 1634), 1918-1919". Archived from the original on 2012-10-16.
