= John Francis Bannon =

American historian

John Francis Bannon (1905 – June 5, 1986) was a Jesuit and a historian of the American West, especially of matters related to the Spanish borderlands.

Bannon received his bachelor's and master's degrees from Saint Louis University. He then completed his Ph.D. at the University of California, Berkeley. Bannon was a professor at Saint Louis University for several years. Bannon's work The Spanish Borderland Frontier, 1513–1821, published in 1970, is the seminal work on the subject.

Saint Louis University has a chair of history named for Bannon.

== Publications ==
His 1970 publication The Spanish Borderland Frontier, 1513–1821 was one of the volumes in the Holt, Rinehart, and Winston "Histories of the American Frontier" and became the seminal work on Borderlands for many years. In a 1972 review, Bannon was described as a "prominent scholar of the 'Bolton School'", referring to Herbert Eugene Bolton, whose 1892 publication The Spanish Borderlands: A Chronicle Old Florida and the Southwest, which highlighted contributions of Spanish northern frontiersmen, was a catalyst for a generation of historians. For many decades, Bolton and his numerous students published prolifically on the interactions between the Spanish frontiersmen, indigenous Americans, French Canadians arriving from the North, and Anglo-Americans from the east.

Bannon provided a "new synthesis based on this vast wealth of information and on his own research." Bannon focused on the successful Spanish expansion from eastern Texas westward, in what was then the frontiers of New Spain. He traced the histories of the "conquistador explorers, missionaries, soldiers, settlers, government officials, and merchants of the immense territory from Florida to California and across the north Mexican provinces."
