= Abraham Nasatir =

American historian (1903–1991)

- Born: Abraham Phineas Nasatir; 1903; Santa Ana, California, U.S.
- Died: January 18, 1991 (aged 87–88); Los Angeles, California, U.S.
- Education: University of California, Berkeley (PhD)
- Occupations: Educator; historian
- Spouse: Ida Hirsch

Abraham Phineas Nasatir (1903 – January 18, 1991) was an American educator and historian who specialized in early California and the Mississippi Valley areas.

== Early life and education ==
Nasatir was born in Santa Ana, California in 1903 to Jewish parents who had immigrated from Lithuania. He completed his Ph.D. at the University of California, Berkeley when he was 19. He largely studied under Herbert Eugene Bolton at UC Berkeley.

== Career and contributions ==
After receiving his Ph.D., Nasatir taught Latin American History for one year at the University of Iowa. Beginning in 1927, taught for 50 years at San Diego State University. In 1986 SDSU named a wing of its social sciences building in his honor, along with a named endowed chair in the SDSU History department.

Nasatir was the recipient of four Fulbright fellowships, and traveled to France, Spain and Chile for research. He published 19 books, and is credited with publishing some 300,000 pages of documents, studies and translations.

He was named Distinguished Professor of the California State College System. He received the Henry R. Wagner Medal of Honor. He presided over the international chapter of Phi Alpha Theta, an international history honor society.

In 1985 Nasatir's house was among those destroyed in the Normal Heights fire, along with 500,000 documents and 2,500 books in his possession. Although this was a truly significant loss, Nasatir had published or used extensively as sources in publication such a large percentage of the documents he had in his possession that the loss was not as devastating as it would have otherwise been. Some of his papers ended up being restored through a freeze-drying salvage process.

== Personal life ==
Nasatir was one of four children: three boys and a girl. He married Ida Hirsch; they had no children. He actively supported the activities of the California Jewish community. He died on January 18, 1991, from complications of pneumonia at Mercy Hospital in Los Angeles, California.

== Publications ==
- Nasatir, Abraham Phineas (1931). John Evans: Explorer and Surveyor. State Historical Society of Missouri.
- Nasatir, Abraham Phineas (1938). Materials Relating to the History of the Mississippi Valley. Louisiana Historical Society.
- Nasatir, Abraham Phineas (1942). Royal Hospitals in Colonial Spanish America. P.B. Hoeber, Inc.
- Nasatir, Abraham Phineas (1945). French Activities in California: An Archival Calendar-Guide. Stanford University Press.
- Nasatir, Abraham Phineas; Loomis, Noel M. (1967). Pedro Vial and the Roads to Santa Fe. University of Oklahoma Press.
- Nasatir, Abraham Phineas (1968). Spanish War Vessels on the Mississippi, 1792–1796. Yale University Press.
- Nasatir, Abraham Phineas; Mills, James R. (1968). Commerce and Contraband in New Orleans During the French and Indian War: A Documentary Study of the Texel and Three Brothers Affairs. American Jewish Archives.
- Bailey, Helen Miller; Nasatir, Abraham Phineas (1973). Latin America: The Development of Its Civilization (3rd ed.). Prentice-Hall.
- Nasatir, Abraham Phineas (1976). Borderland in Retreat: From Spanish Louisiana to the Far Southwest. University of New Mexico Press.
- Nasatir, Abraham Phineas (1979). The Gold Rush and the British Navy, San Francisco 1849. San Diego Corral of the Westerners.
