= SS Mariposa (1883) =

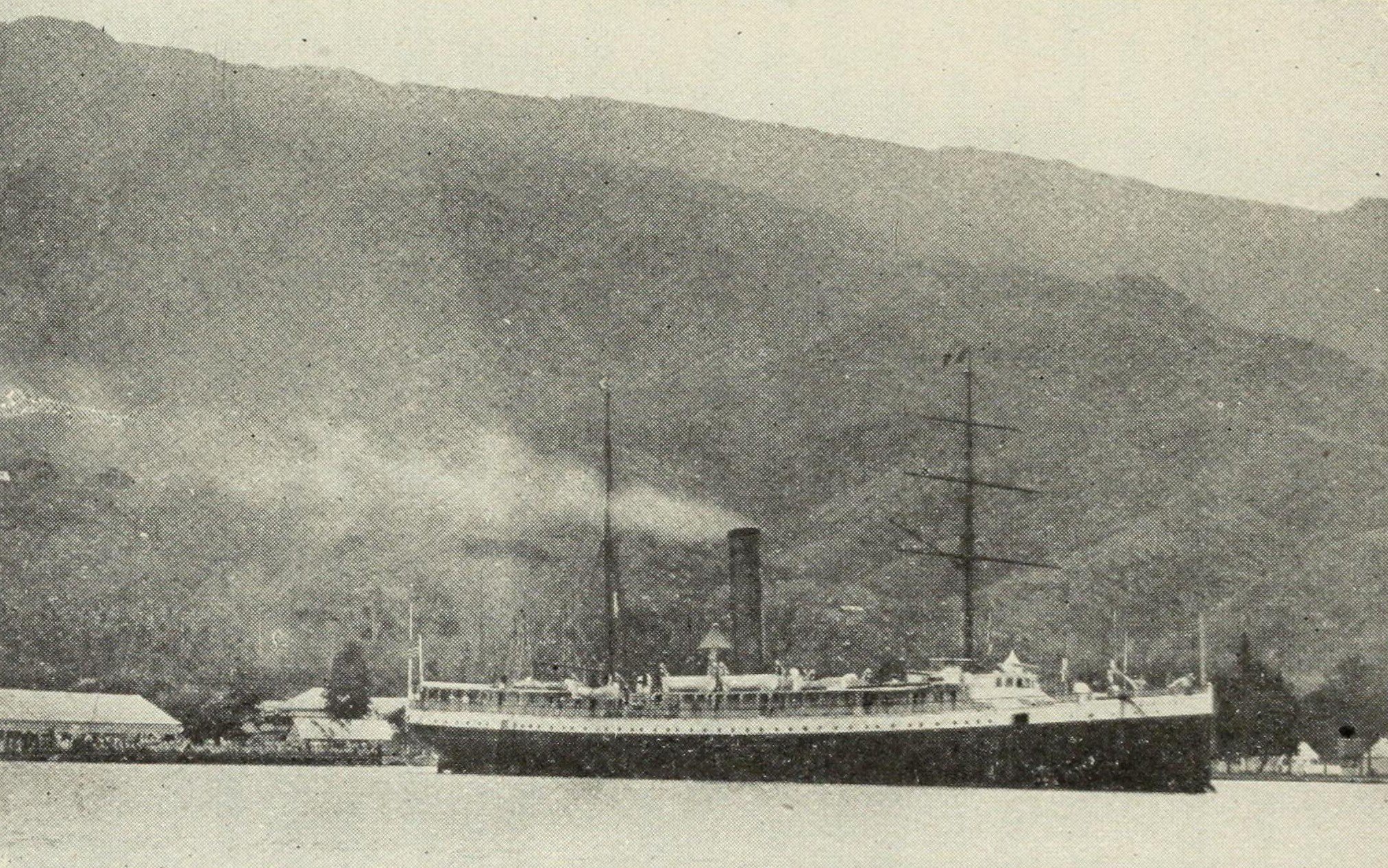
- SS Mariposa leaving the harbor of Papeete, French Polynesia, November 13, 1903.

History

United States
- Name: SS Mariposa
- Owner: Oceanic Steamship Company (1883-1912); Alaska Steamship Company (1912-1917)
- Builder: William Cramp & Sons, Philadelphia
- Yard number: 233
- Launched: 15 March 1883
- Fate: Sank 18 November 1917

General characteristics
- Tonnage: 3,000 GRT

SS Mariposa was a steam passenger and cargo liner which served in the Pacific Ocean from 1883 to 1917.

== History ==
Mariposa was an iron ship built in 1883 in Philadelphia by the William Cramp & Sons Shipbuilding Company. It was of 3,000 gross register tons and was built for the Oceanic Steamship Company, which had been founded in 1881 by John D. Spreckels & Brothers to provide passenger and cargo service between San Francisco and Honolulu, Hawaii. Later their service was extended to include Australia and New Zealand.

The ship was sold in 1912 to the Alaska Steamship Company, but not renamed.

On her final voyage she rescued the crew of Mahattan which was wrecked on 15 November. On 18 November 1917 Mariposa was underway in Sumner Strait when she hit a rock at Strait Island near Point Baker, Alaska. She had 269 passengers and almost $1 million in freight aboard when the accident occurred. The ship quickly settled to the bottom in shallow water. The day was calm, allowing all the passengers and 93 members of the crew to be safely evacuated to Wrangell. USLHT Fern carried all the passenger baggage to Wrangell. Mariposa could not be raised, but some of her cargo, and her donkey engine and other machinery were salvaged.

In 1926 the Oceanic Steamship Company was bought out by the Matson Line of which it became a subsidiary.

== Famous passengers ==
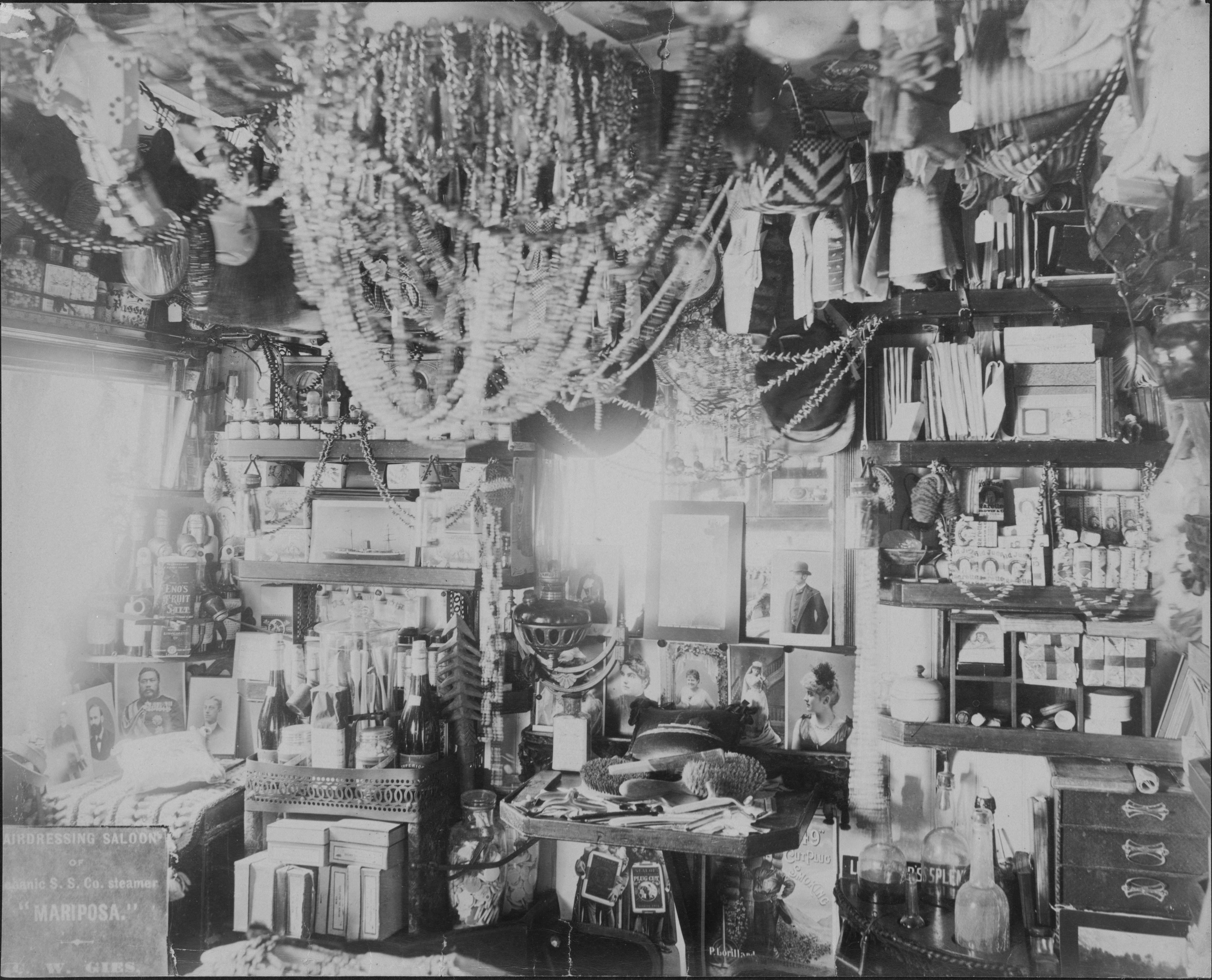
Hair salon (barbershop) on the Mariposa (1890)

- Marianne Cope, a missionary Religious Sister, was the leader of a small group of Franciscan Sisters who sailed to Hawaii on this ship at the request of the King of Hawaii to provide medical care for the lepers of the country. She and Sister Leopoldina Burns and their companions arrived in Honolulu on November 8, 1883, and she spent the rest of her life in this service, dying on the island of Molokai in 1918. She was declared a saint by the Catholic Church in 2012 for her heroic and holy life of service and self-sacrifice. She is also honored as a saint by the Episcopal Church.
- King O'Malley arrived in Sydney aboard the Mariposa in late July 1888, travelling from San Francisco via Hawaii. He left the U.S. to escape embezzlement allegations. In Australia he became a member of the inaugural federal parliament and served two terms as a cabinet minister.
- Sarah Bernhardt, French actress. In August 1891 the Sarah Bernhardt Company passed through Auckland on the Mariposa en route from Sydney to Honolulu.
- Jessie Ackermann was the much-travelled delegate of the World's Woman's Christian Temperance Union who left Sydney on the Mariposa on 20 March 1893 to return to America.
- Jack London and his wife, the writer Charmian London, traveled from Papeete to San Francisco and back in January and February, 1908.
- William Priestly MacIntosh left Sydney in the Mariposa in April 1898 on the first leg of a journey to Italy where he was going to supervise the roughing out of the marble sculptures for the Queen Victoria Building.
- Victor Segalen, a French Navy Doctor, who later became famous as an ethnographer, writer and poet, boarded the SS Mariposa in San Francisco in January 1903 to travel to Tahiti for an assignment on a French Navy ship.

== See also ==
- Alameda, a sister ship
- SS Mariposa (1931)
