= Arthur H. Clark Company =

American publishing and printing company

- Parent company: University of Oklahoma Press
- Founded: 1902
- Founder: Arthur Henry Clark
- Country of origin: United States
- Headquarters location: Norman, Oklahoma
- Publication types: Books
- Nonfiction topics: Western history
- Official website: www.ahclark.com

The Arthur H. Clark Company (founded 1902) is a major printer of publications related to the history of the Western United States.

The company was named for its founder Arthur Henry Clark (1868-1951). He was born and raised in England and attended the University of Oxford for a time before having to find work because of reverses in his family finances. He then began an apprenticeship with the publishing house of Henry Southern & Company. After completing his apprenticeship he moved to Chicago, Illinois where he took a job in Alexander C. McClurg's publishing house A. C. McClurg and Company. In 1892 Clark established his own bookstore in Chicago. He was then recruited by Burrows Brothers of Cleveland, Ohio where he became manager of their rare book sales. While with Burrows Brothers Clark was the main force behind the publication of The Jesuit Relations (first published 1632–1673).

In 1902 Clark established Arthur H. Clark company as a bookselling and publishing establishment in Cleveland. The company's first publication was a 16-volume collection by Archer Butler Hulbert on historical trails in the United States east of the Mississippi. The next publication was a collection of the lectures of historian John Bach McMaster.

In 1930 the company headquarters were relocated to Glendale, California. The biggest undertaking of the company in the decade after its founders death when leadership was taken over by Arthur H. Clark, Jr. was the 14 Volume The Far West and the Rockies, 1820-1875, a collection of primary documents of early Western United States history edited by Leroy R. Hafen and his wife Ann W. Hafen.

In July 2006, the company was acquired by the University of Oklahoma Press and relocated to Norman, Oklahoma, where it continues as an imprint.

== Sources ==
- Clark, Robert A.; Brunet, Patrick J. (2003-02-05). The Arthur H. Clark Company: An Americana Century, 1902–2002. Spokane, Wash: The Arthur H. Clark Company. ISBN 978-0-87062-319-6. Includes a brief company history and a full bibliography to 2002.
- Grivas, Theodore (1963). "The Arthur H. Clark Company, Publisher of the West: A Review of Sixty Years of Service, 1902-1962". Arizona and the West. 5 (1): 63–78. ISSN 0004-1408. JSTOR 40167045.
