= Oceanic Steamship Company =

American shipping company (1881–1926)

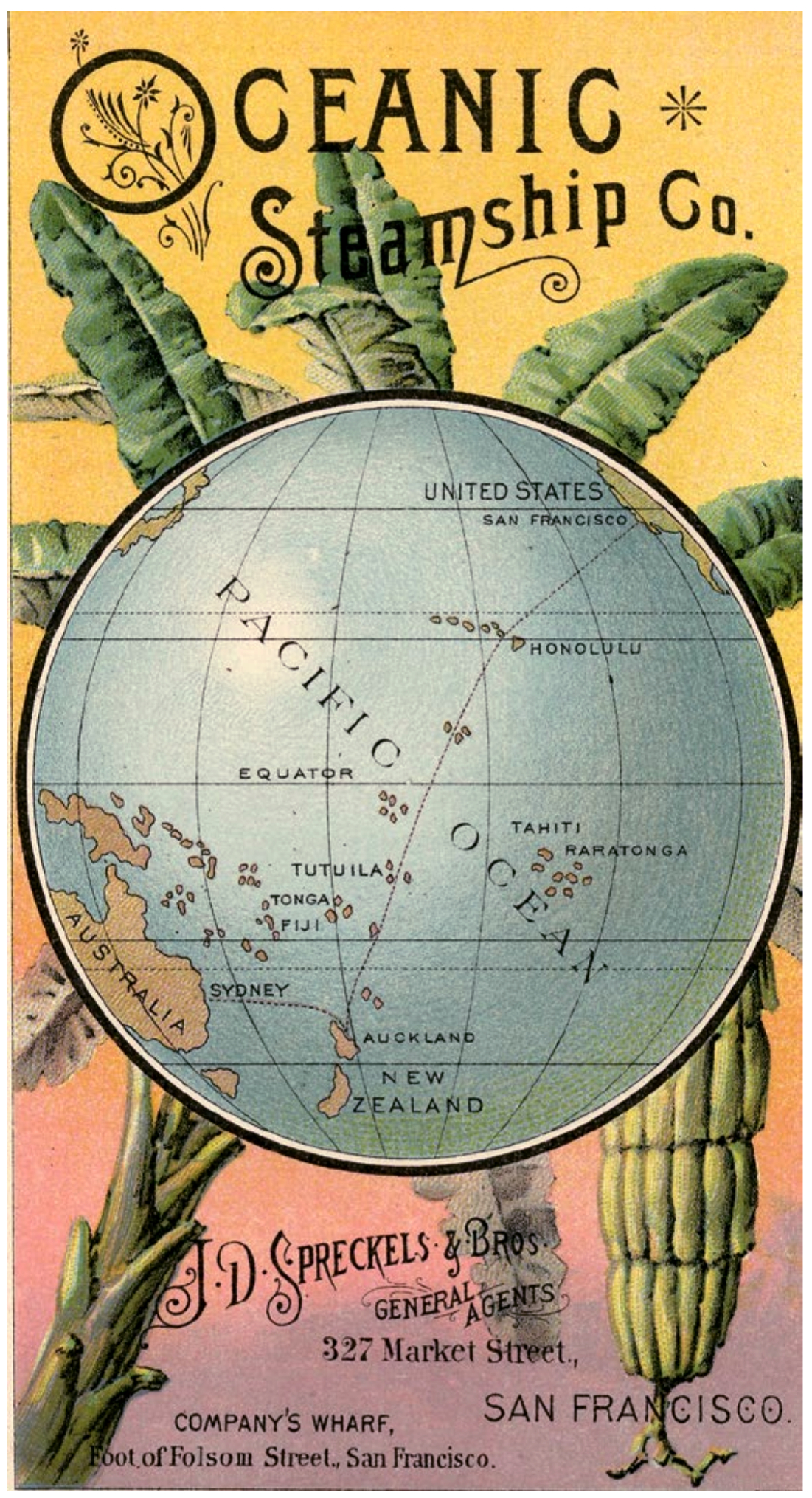
- Brochure showing its transpacific route (1889)
- Industry: Shipping, transportation
- Founded: 1881
- Defunct: 1926
- Successor: Matson, Inc.
- Headquarters: San Francisco, United States
- Area served: transpacific (fleet)
- Key people: John D. Spreckels
- Parent: Wm. G. Irwin and Co. Ltd.

The Oceanic Steamship Company was an American shipping company established in 1881. It was founded by John D. Spreckels and the Spreckels family as a key transportation network from San Francisco to Honolulu, then part of the Hawaiian Kingdom. The company was a subsidiary of the Wm. G. Irwin and Co. Ltd. holding company that was established by Claus Spreckels. Oceanic is cited as an early example of the shipping link in the vertical integration strategy pioneered by Claus Spreckels in the sugar industry.

The Spreckels family began shipping raw sugar and other goods from their plantations in Hawaii using sailing ships, but soon recognized the benefits of steamships. With the help of shipbuilders Matthew Turner and William Cramp & Sons, the company built a new fleet and diversified to include freight, mail service and passengers. They became an early key player in the development of tourism to Hawaii and Oceania. By the 1890s, Oceanic was known for its quick and dependable service and comfortable accommodations. Matson purchased the company in 1926 and continued to use the Oceanic name throughout the 20th century.

== Background ==
The early commercial shipping industry in the Hawaiian Kingdom had its origins in the sandalwood trade established under the rule of Kamehameha I in the late 18th century. C. Brewer & Co., the oldest of the Big Five companies in Hawaii, was involved in the sandalwood trade to China in the early part of the 19th century. The sandalwood trade filled the Chinese demand for temple incense, but by 1830, the sandalwood forests in Hawaii had been overharvested and denuded. A decade earlier, whaling in Hawaii had begun to take off as an industry; it lasted until 1859.

Large vessels run by the Pacific Mail Steamship Company dominated shipping between San Francisco and Australia in the 1870s. German-American industrialist Claus Spreckels, the founder of the Spreckels sugar empire in California, arrived in Hawaii in 1876, just after the Reciprocity Treaty of 1875 had been signed. The treaty gave Hawaiian sugarcane planters an additional two cents ($0.60 in 2025) per pound, leading to major investment in the sugarcane industry. Spreckels soon became one of the largest sugar plantation owners in Hawaii; the 40,000-acre (160 km^{2}) Spreckelsville plantation on Maui was the largest in the world in 1892.

== History ==
=== First sailing ships ===
American businessman John D. Spreckels, the son of Claus Spreckels, organized J. D. Spreckels and Brothers in 1879, running ships from San Francisco carrying lumber and merchandise to Hawaii and returning home with sugar and rice. J. D. Spreckels and Brothers were originally agents for Claus Spreckel's sugar refining business in California. They began with the Claus Spreckels, one of the largest and fastest schooners in San Francisco at the time, traveling in June of that year from San Francisco to Kahului in just 9.5 days. Irwin & Co. were agents for Spreckels and Brothers in Hawaii and handled the business for sugar plantations. Claus Spreckels returned home with 681,865 pounds of sugar in her holds.

Soon after, they launched the John D. Spreckels; by February 1880, ships bearing the names of both father and son were competing for the fastest route from San Francisco to Hawaii. The race drew interest and attention in local newspapers. Both ships arrived in the islands in just 10.5 days. They were followed by additional ships named after family and friends, including the W. H. Dimond, Anna, the W. G. Irwin, Consuelo, Selina, and the Emma Augusta. Two of the ships later broke records at the time, with the W. G. Irwin sailing from San Francisco to Kahului in 8 days, 17 hours, and the W. H. Dimond sailing the return route in 11 days. This experience led the family to start their own steamship line.

=== Inception ===
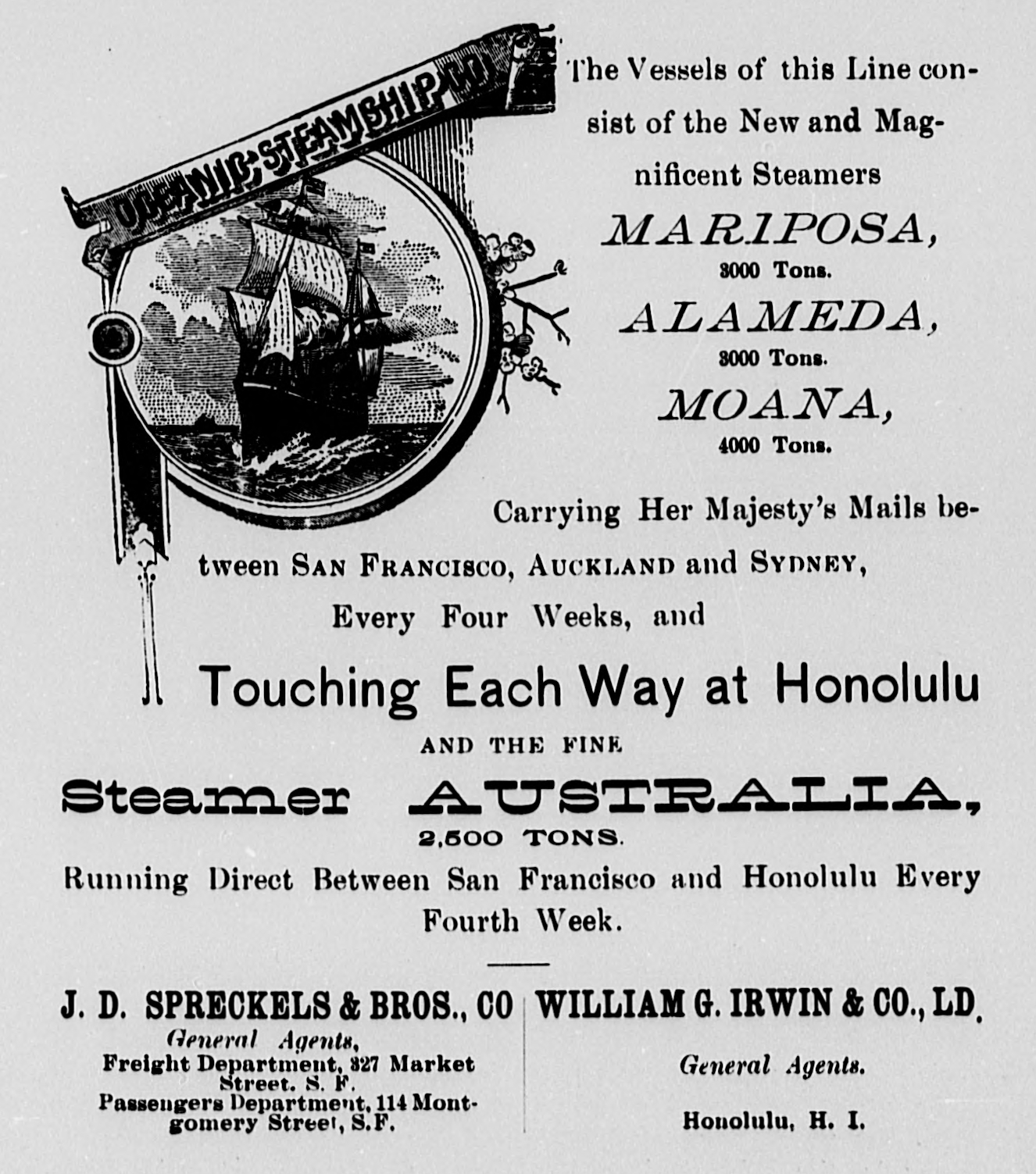
1899 advertisement

Partners John D. and Adolph B. Spreckels incorporated Oceanic in December 1881 with more than $2 million ($66.7 million in 2025) in capital, establishing a reliable, scheduled trade route between the mainland United States and the Hawaiian Islands. Oceanic was the first steamship line to run a scheduled Honolulu to San Francisco route on a semimonthly basis, with the company chartering their first ship, the Suez, a 2,800-ton British steamer, for one year. At the time, there were only two other major companies shipping freight along this route, the Planters Line, a shipping company used by Spreckel's competitors in the Hawaii sugar industry, and the Pacific Mail Steamship Company, then the leader in transpacific maritime trade.

By 1883, the Mariposa, a ship built by William Cramp & Sons for Oceanic, had completed the San Francisco to Honolulu route in a record 5 days, 21 hours. The company began to make moves to weaken the hegemony of Pacific Mail in 1885. Pacific Mail's dominance was not without criticism, which played in Oceanic's favor: Pacific Mail was criticized for its poorly maintained ships, unpredictable mail service, and failure to listen to the needs of Hawaii's business community, which wanted a reliable form of freight and mail service, as well as a way for tourists to visit and spend money in the local economy. Pacific Mail was also the chief operator transporting cheap Chinese immigrant labor to Hawaii's sugar plantations at a time when anti-Chinese sentiment was high.

=== Challenge to Pacific Mail ===
Spreckels mounted a lobbying campaign for the U.S. mail subsidy that Pacific Mail received and was ultimately successful in convincing Congress to award the subsidy to Oceanic instead. This gave Oceanic Pacific Mail's route to Sydney and Auckland in addition to Hawaii. Five years later, Oceanic won another subsidy, this time from the government of New Zealand for a joint venture with the Union Steam Ship Company of New Zealand Limited. They planned to charter the Zealandia and the Australia, Pacific Mail's former ships owned by John Elder & Co. of Glasgow, Scotland.

Instead, John Elder & Co. created a competing Sydney–San Francisco route with the support of the government of New South Wales and merchants in Sydney and Honolulu who opposed Spreckels. Opposition to Claus Spreckels was already well established by 1881, with Spreckels known as ‘ona miliona (a millionaire) by Hawaiians. "Word spread fast throughout the Hawaiian community", writes historian Sandra E. Bonura, "that if you were Claus Spreckels, you were not obligated to follow the same laws ascribed to ordinary Hawaiians."

Not to be outdone, Oceanic cut rates and began racing their steamships against the rival line to demonstrate their shipping supremacy. Billed by newspapers as the "great ocean race", Oceanic's Alameda gave Elder's Zealandia a major head start on the San Francisco to Sydney route. Alameda soon erased Zealandia's head start, pulled 52 hours ahead of her in elapsed travel time, and finally arrived 13 hours ahead in Sydney at the finish. The writing was on the wall. Elder reversed course and sold both ships to Oceanic the next month. Zealandia and the Australia were added to Oceanic's new mail route as part of her expanding fleet, and became the first modern, ocean-going steamships to fly the flag of the Hawaiian Kingdom.

With the help of government subsidies passed under the Ocean Mail Act of 1891, Oceanic transported mail along the San Francisco, Australia, and New Zealand route. During the Spanish–American War, the U.S. Armed Forces chartered the Australia and the Zealandia as troopships. Several years later, the fleet was joined by the Sierra, the Sonoma, and the Ventura. The company expanded further, owning a total of 17 ships.

=== Later years ===
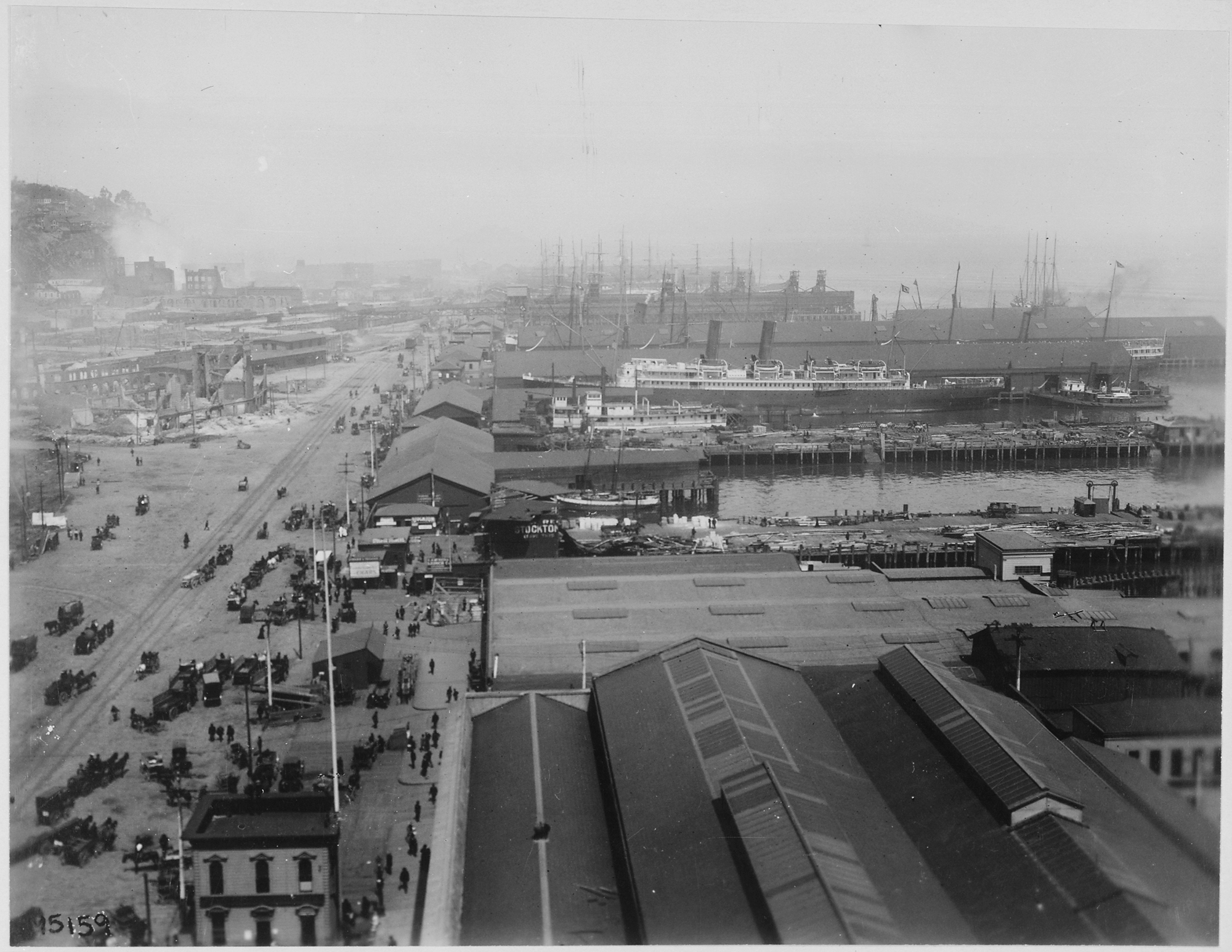
Smoldering ruins next to the piers, with the Sonoma fully intact.

The 1906 San Francisco earthquake shut the company's Australian service down until June. On April 18, Oceanic's offices were destroyed and many of their records lost in the subsequent fires. The Sonoma was docked at the piers north of the Ferry Building, but survived the fires. She was used as a refugee ship and helped feed survivors in the aftermath of the temblor, with many of the homeless including members of the Spreckels family themselves, as their houses had burned down. Meanwhile, the Sierra was already out at sea heading back to the ruins of San Francisco. She was carrying 75 workers from Auckland and Sydney looking to find work in the reconstruction effort.

A request for an increase in the mail subsidy was made in 1907, but it was denied by Congress. John D. Spreckels retaliated by ending regular mail service to New Zealand and Australia for three years by removing three of their ships from the route. The Sierra was chartered by the U.S. military on an Atlantic route in 1918 for use as a troopship during World War I, helping to move troops to France. When the war ended, she brought American troops home from Europe. Matson acquired and took over Oceanic in May 1926. At the time of its sale, The New York Times described Oceanic as "one of the pioneers in transpacific trade", noting that it was the only American company running from the port of San Francisco to Australia. The Times also reported that the Oceanic name would continue to be used and its routes would remain unchanged. At least 11 additional ships sailed under the Oceanic name as a subsidiary of Matson as late as the 1970s.

== Tourism ==
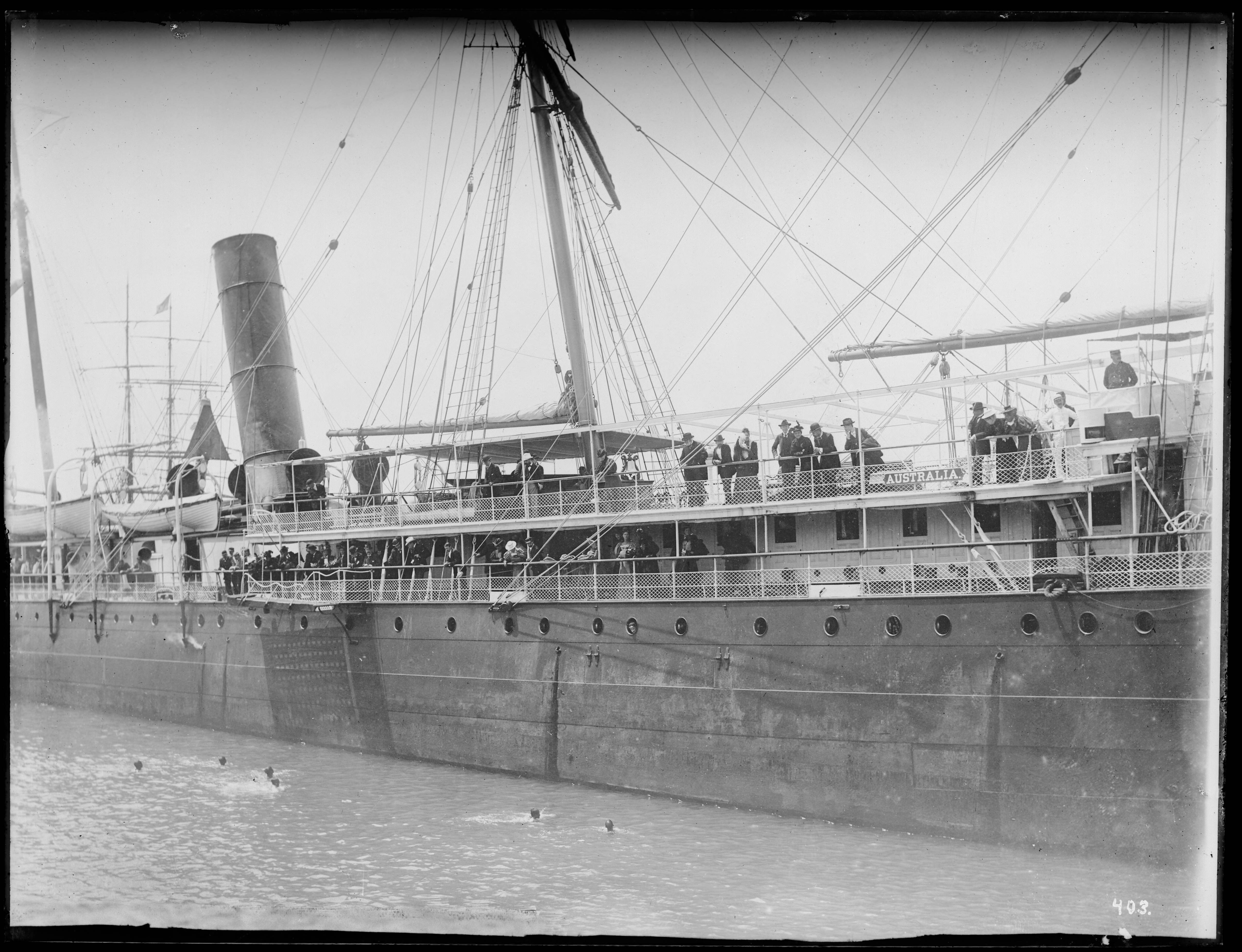
The Oceanic steamship Australia in Hawaii, 1907

The Oceanic Steamship Company attracted wealthy tourists from the American mainland interested in traveling in upscale accommodations to the Hawaiian Kingdom and to Oceania. In 1889, first-class cabin passage for a one-way ticket from San Francisco to Honolulu started at $75 ($2,688 in 2025), or $125 ($4,479 in 2025) round trip. Children and servants received reduced rates, with steerage class travel starting at $25 ($895.80 in 2025). The company recommended three week trips to Hawaii in their promotional brochure, accounting for one week of sightseeing in the islands and about two weeks travel time. Oceanic's brochure promoted tourism, recommending that visitors take in the city of Honolulu, ʻIolani Palace, Diamond Head, the sport of surfing, and Kīlauea on the Big Island.

Their early advertising and marketing campaigns popularized Hawaiian words like aloha and luau, and helped to promote the sport of surfing to the wider public in the 1880s. The only major steamship companies transporting tourists to the Hawaiian Islands by 1893 were Oceanic and the Occidental and Oriental Steamship Company. Beginning in the early 1890s, and for a brief period of about a decade, Oceanic's Mariposa and the Alameda were described as the most modern steamships in their class. Oceanic's accommodations were noted for their luxury, with passengers praising their comfort, qualify of food, tidiness, and use of electric lights.

The company reduced regular steamship travel time from seven to six days from San Francisco to Honolulu aboard the Zealandia in 1895, with tourism aboard Oceanic ships like the Australia reported to be in demand even during the period of Hawaiian rebellions. By 1902, two of Oceanic's ships, the Australia and Zealandia, were running the San Francisco to Tahiti route; the Mariposa and Alameda were servicing the San Francisco to Honolulu route; and the Sierra, Sonoma, and Ventura were running every three weeks from San Francisco to Auckland and on to Sydney, with a stop in Honolulu. Such long distance ocean voyaging trips would not become obtainable to most people until lower priced air travel in the mid-20th century opened tourism up to Hawaii and Oceania to the general public and replaced ocean liners with jet airplanes.

== Vertical integration ==
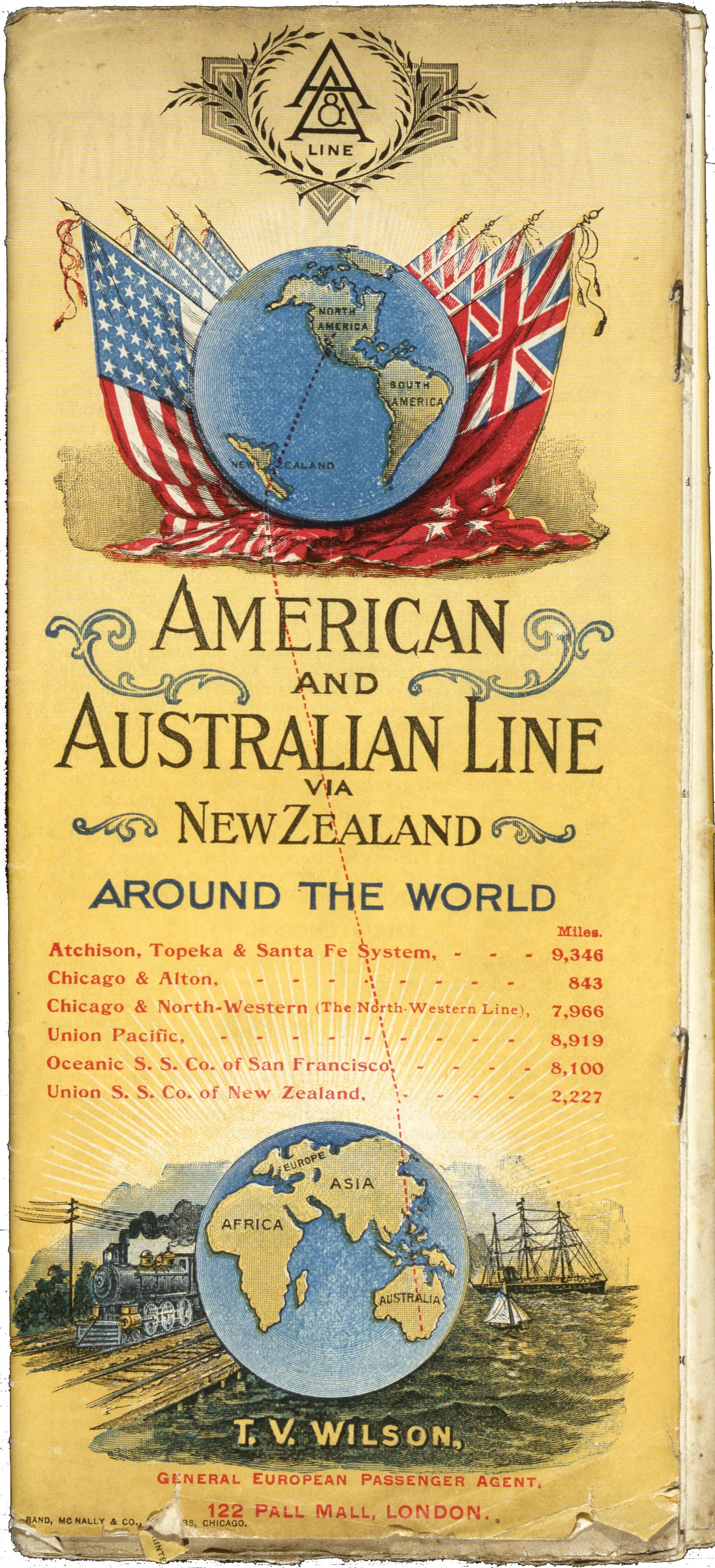
A brochure advertising an "Around the World" tour with Oceanic covering 8,100 miles (13,000 km) of the route

In the 1960s, Jacob O. Adler at the University of Hawaiʻi studied the vertical integration strategy used by Claus Spreckels to operate his sugar empire in the late 19th century. Adler found that Oceanic played a key part in the third stage of the overall process, with Spreckels in control of every step. He owned the sugar plantations, the port landings and warehouses, partnered with agent W. G. Irwin & Co. to handle their commercial business, and used Oceanic, also a subsidiary of Irwin, to ship sugar to California for refining in San Francisco, a refinery also owned by Spreckels. Adler notes that Spreckels was the "Grower, agent, shipper, [and] refiner".

== Legacy ==
The company filled a niche formerly held by the Pacific Mail Steamship Company, which did not appear to recognize the opportunities for shipping and tourism. For the next several decades, Oceanic began to build a large fleet of ocean steamers for moving freight and passengers from San Francisco to Honolulu, and to Australia and New Zealand. The company took over the contract from Pacific Mail and began delivering the mail in Oceania and importing coal to California. Growing to a total of 17 ships, the "Spreckels line" as it was then called, began with an international fleet, but after the Hawaiian Organic Act was passed in 1900, U.S. law required it to become wholly American in time.

The company became known as the principal South Pacific shipping company between the West Coast of the United States and Oceania in the late 19th century. Oceanic is credited with establishing a stable shipping industry for freight and for helping start the initial commercial tourism industry in Hawaii and the larger Pacific. The company began to enter a slow decline near the fin de siècle, as the Spanish–American War and the newly created Territory of Hawaii weakened its dominance. Nevertheless, the company had a lasting historical impact on the development of the cities of San Francisco and San Diego, and helped to strengthen the importance of military and commercial assets for the United States in the 20th century.
