= Alaska Steamship Company =

Shipping company

- Founded: August 3, 1894
- Defunct: January, 1971
- Headquarters: Seattle, Washington

The Alaska Steamship Company was formed on August 3, 1894. While it originally set out to ship passengers and fishing products, the Alaska Steamship Company began shipping mining equipment, dog sleds, and cattle at the outbreak of the Klondike Gold Rush of 1897. The company was purchased by the Alaska Syndicate and merged with the Northwestern Steamship Company in 1909, but retained its name, and the fleet was expanded to 18 ships. During World War II, the government took over the company's ships. When the war ended, the company struggled to compete with the new Alaska Highway for passengers and freight. It discontinued passenger service altogether in 1954 and shut down operations in 1971.

== Origins and growth ==
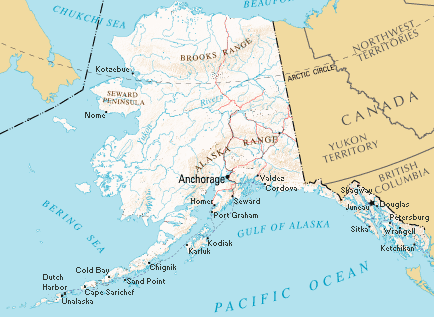
The company's Alaskan ports of call

The company was founded by Charles Peabody, Captain George Roberts, Captain Melville Nichols, George Lent, Frank E. Burns and Walter Oakes. This group of six men began gathering $30,000 by selling 300 shares of stock, at $100 each. Peabody served as president of the company from its creation until 1912. The first vessel they purchased was the 140-foot steamer Willapa.

A railroad to serve the mines in the interior encouraged mining activity and brought more fortune-seekers and tourists. By 1905, service was shifted from the Juneau and Skagway region to the Valdez - Cordova, then eventually to Nome, where Alaska Steamship was ready to capitalize on the bonanza by switching its ships accordingly. Their ships supplied the growing number of religious missions that were being established and the burgeoning fish cannery industry.

When the Klondike Gold Strike took place in 1897, Charles Peabody reorganized the company and rapidly expanded his fleet of ships to meet the sudden demand for service. In 1898, the stockholders formed the Puget Sound Navigation Company as a subsidiary. The new company was legally organized in Nevada where corporate law was more lenient. The Puget Sound routes allowed the company to continue to use some of its smaller, older vessels as they became unsuitable for the strenuous Alaska routes.

In 1902, the Puget Sound Navigation Co. started a steamship route from Port Townsend and Port Angeles, Washington to Victoria, British Columbia, Canada, carrying both freight and passengers. Their competitor the Pacific Steamship Company had committed their entire fleet of ships to the Klondike run and were unprepared to switch to alternates when the gold rush subsided. The Canadian Pacific Railway, their other potential competitor, decided at first that would not compete on the Victoria route, and chose to concentrate on their Empress ocean-going sleek steamships which fed passengers into their rail route across the Canadian Rockies and to their Empress Hotels in Victoria and Vancouver. On May 2, 1903, Peabody and his associates purchased the controlling stock of La Conner Trading and Transportation Company. They initially named the merged company the Inland Navigation Co. but later resumed using Puget Sound Navigation Co. The new company became the biggest inland shipping company of Puget Sound.

=== Merger ===
Ohio anchored near Nome, Alaska in 1907

In 1907 the Alaska Syndicate, funded by Morgan & Co. and the Daniel Guggenheim, bought the company to service its growing copper mining operation in the Wrangell Mountains. They merged its operations with the Northwest Steamship Company, which owned 12 canneries, and a retail store, but retained the Alaska Steamship Company name. The merged company began operations with 12 ships, and they added to their fleet until they had 18 ships. They expanded service from Ketchikan to Kotzebue. They served all of southwestern Alaska, southeaster Alaska, the Seward Peninsula, the Bering Sea, St. Michael and Nome. The resulting company had a virtual monopoly on the Alaska shipping industry.

Charles Peabody retired in 1912 and S.W. Eccles of the Guggenheim Company.

In 1915, Kennecott Copper Company, also owned by Morgan & Co. and the M. Guggenheim Sons, acquired the Alaska Syndicate's interests in the Alaska Steamship Company with a stock transaction.

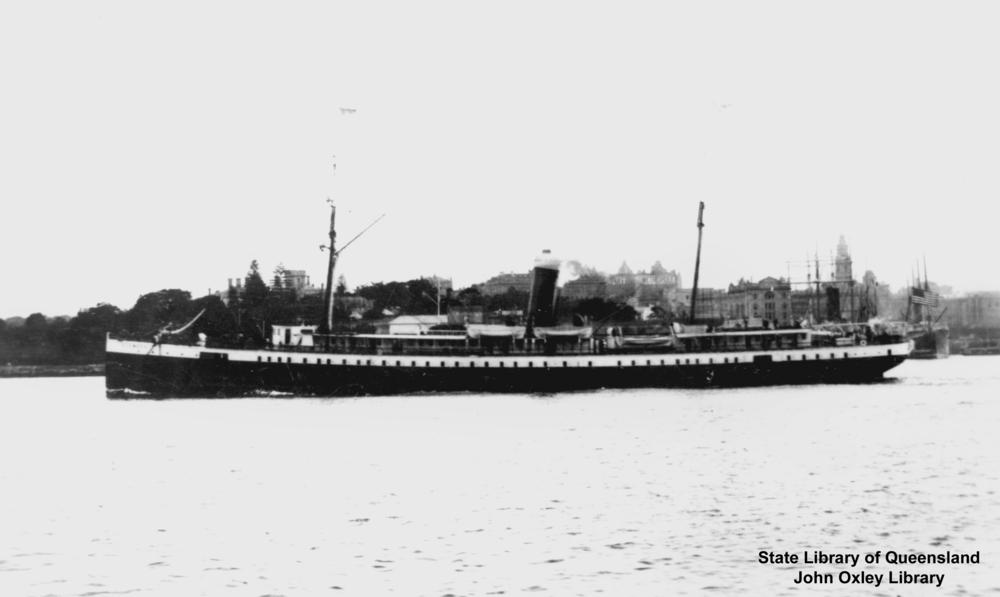
Alameda, bought from the Oceanic Steamship Co in 1910

The company greatly benefited from the Merchant Marine Act of 1920, which required ships connecting two United States ports to fly the United States flag. The legislation forced two Canadian shipping companies out of the Alaska market. The Alaska Steamship Company eventually enjoyed a near monopoly of freight and passenger service to Alaska.

In the 1930s the company bought its long-time rival, the Pacific Steamship Company. Many Alaskan residents began complaining about irregular service and high fares. As a result, the U.S. Congress passed the Intercoastal Shipping Act of 1933. It required specific schedules and approved, published cargo rates.

=== World War II and afterward ===
When World War II broke out, the Federal Government took control of most U.S. registered ships to support the war effort, including the company's fleet of 15 vessels. The company became an agent for the War Shipping Administration and was assigned to manage its own ships along with sixty others. During the war, five ships were lost. Before World War II, 42 ships had served Alaska, but after the war, only seven were in service. The Alaska Steamship Company was purchased in August 1944 for $4,290,000 by the Skinner and Eddy Corporation of Seattle. Skinner and Eddy also purchased the only other major Alaska shipping company to survive after the war the Northland Transportation Company.

The company's business was slowly eroded due to the end of federal war-related subsidies, rising fuel and labor costs, and new competition from the trucking industry and cargo airlines. In an effort to reduce costs, the Alaska Steamship company added tugs, barges, and container ships to their fleet. These allowed for smaller crews, faster loading and unloading, and less damage to the cargo.

=== Shift to tourism ===
House flag of the Alaska Steamship Company

After World War II, when the freight business slowed, the company decided to focus on tourism and introduced their ship the Alaska in January 1946. It was later joined by the Aleutian, Baranof, Yukon, and Denali. The ships called at Ketchikan (two days journey), Juneau (three days journey) and Seward (five days journey). Intermediate ports of call included Wrangell, Petersburg, Skagway, Sitka, Cordova, Valdez, Kodiak and Seldovia. All the steamers could accommodate over 200 passengers in classes ranging from steerage to a deluxe cabin with private bath.

== End of service ==
Unable to compete with faster, cheaper air service, the company discontinued passenger service altogether in 1954, though by then it had established itself within the container ship industry. Despite these efforts, the Alaska Steamship Company shut down in January 1971.

== Shipwrecks ==
The waters of the inside passage were often inhospitable and the jagged coastline was treacherous. While most of the ships in the Alaska Steamship Company's fleet were sold, scrapped, or repurposed, a number of their ships ended their careers as wrecks.

- Ohio, purchased in 1898, wrecked on the coast of British Columbia in 1909.
- Olympia, acquired by merger in 1909, ran aground on Bligh Reef on 10 December 1910.
- Admiral Clark, steamship acquired in November 1915 from the Rutland Transit Company, of Rutland, VA. While en route to the West Indies she foundered in Caribbean Sea southwest of Cuba on August 16, 1916, in a probable hurricane. Only 6 survivors, loss of 20 men.
- Seward, acquired by merger in 1909, was captured and sunk by SM U-52 on 7 April 1917.
- Mariposa, purchased in 1912, sank after hitting Straits Island Reef on 18 December 1917.
- Dirigo, built in 1898, sank on 16 November 1918 on a voyage from Cordova to Seattle.
- Alaska, built in 1889, was stranded and sank at Blunt's Reef off of California on 6 August 1921.
- Kennecott, built in 1921, wrecked at Hunters Point in 1923.
- Aleutian, built in 1898, sank off of Kodiak Island on 26 May 1929.
- Alameda, acquired in 1920, was damaged by fire at Seattle Pier on 28 November 1931 and subsequently scrapped.
- Curaçao, built in 1895, caught fire and later sank on 13 July 1940.
- Latouche, built in 1910, was captured by the Imperial Japanese Navy in 1942 and was sunk by a US air attack on 21 October 1944.
- Yukon, purchased in 1923, ran aground in Johnstone Bay 10 miles (16 km) south of Seward, Alaska on 4 February 1946. Three passengers were killed.
- Redondo, purchased in 1915, sunk at Richmond, California in 1948.
- Oduna, purchased in 1964, wrecked at Unimak Island on 26 November 1965.

== Archives ==
- Alaska Steamship Company Photograph Collection. 1940s. 13 photographic prints, 30 stereo slides.
- Alaska Steamship Company Photographs of Docks and Harbors. 1939-1971. 978 photographic prints.
- Historical Menu Collection. 1884-2003. 740 items (10 boxes). Contains menus from Alaska Steamship Company: Alaska SS, Aleutian SS, Baranoff SS, Northwestern SS, Polar Star MS, Victoria SS, and Yukon SS spanning from 1931-1954.
- Marine Cooks and Stewards Union Records. 1954. 3 items.
- Robert Hitchman Papers. 1836-1986. Contains map of steamship routes and railroads in Alaska from the Alaska Steamship Company during 1917.
