= Normal Heights, San Diego =

- Community of San Diego
- Normal Heights
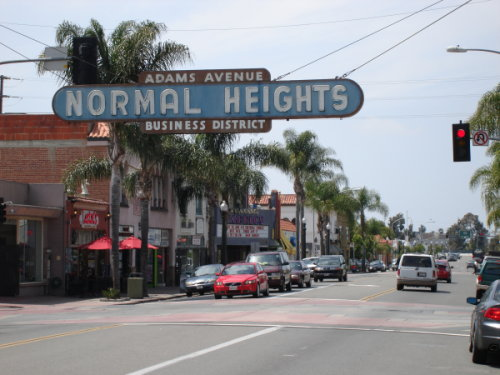
- Looking west down Adams Avenue

- Location within Central San Diego Normal Heights, San Diego (California) Normal Heights, San Diego (the United States)
- Coordinates: 32°45′48.09″N 117°07′08″W
- Country: United States of America
- State: California
- County: San Diego
- City: San Diego

Normal Heights is a neighborhood in the mid-city region of San Diego, California.

== History ==
The "Normal" part of "Normal Heights" refers to the State Normal School (teachers college), the predecessor to San Diego State University; the normal school was located in the adjacent University Heights neighborhood and founded in 1899.

At the time of the founding of San Diego, the area that is now Normal Heights was largely covered with brush and populated only by rabbits. Later it had a few farms, but development was limited by lack of water. Speculators became interested in the area during the San Diego land boom of the 1880s, and several land development companies were actively working in the area by the 1900s. Around 1905 a reservoir was built in University Heights; partly, as a result, the number of buildings in Normal Heights increased from one in January 1906 to 43 in December of the same year. The community was officially founded in 1906, when a syndicate led by D. C. Collier and George M. Hawley filed a subdivision map with the county. At that time it was an independent community, not part of the city of San Diego. It became one of San Diego's first "streetcar suburbs" with the development of an electric trolley route along Adams Avenue, part of the San Diego Electric Railway system. A trolley barn was built in Normal Heights in 1913; the Adams Avenue Operating Division was established in 1915.

A group of residents organized the Normal Heights Improvement Association in 1911, establishing a county public library and other improvements. Normal Heights Central School was established in 1912. The county began paving the roads and establishing gutters and sidewalks in 1913. A commercial business district developed in the 1920s, centered on Adams Avenue between 37th Street (now Felton Street) and 38th Street (now 34th Street); the area is now considered a potential historic district, referred to as the Carteri Center after local resident Benjamin J. Carteri, who spurred business and residential development in the 1920s. The community was annexed to the city of San Diego in 1925.

In June 1985 a wildfire burned into Normal Heights from the Mission Valley slope just north of the community. The blaze damaged or destroyed "expensive bluff-top buildings with views of the valley and Mission Bay" as well as "modest bungalows built when the Normal Heights community was first started in 1906." The fire destroyed 69 homes. Later that year Normal Heights was a finalist for the title of All America City; the designation was based in part on neighborhood support for the victims of the fire, as well as a neighborhood campaign for a city park and density-decreasing community plan.

== Geography ==
Normal Heights is centrally located in the city of San Diego, on a mesa just south of Mission Valley. Its borders are defined by Interstate 805 to the west, Interstate 8 to the north, State Route 15 to the east, and El Cajon Boulevard to the south.

A notable building in the community is a bungalow court on Adams Avenue designed by Louis L. Gill, originally named El Sueño and now known as Santa Rosa Court. Another is a Carmelite monastery on Hawley Blvd. designed by Frank L. Hope, Sr.

== Demographics ==
A 2001 study found the neighborhood to have a median age of 31 and an ethnic breakdown of 53% white, 25% Hispanic, 13% African American, and 9% Asian American. Normal Heights was reported by The San Diego Union-Tribune to be the only neighborhood to perfectly reflect the ethnic diversity of San Diego.

== Culture ==
Like other urban mesa neighborhoods north of Balboa Park, Normal Heights has a high rate of pedestrian activity. The stretch of Adams Avenue between Texas Street on the west and Ohio Street on the east is sometimes referred to as Antique Row, due to its numerous antique stores. A landmark neon sign over Adams Avenue at Felton Street identifies the neighborhood.

=== Annual events ===
Neighborhood events that take place in Normal Heights include the Adams Avenue Street Fair, a free music festival typically held the last weekend in September. Founded in 1986, featured performers include Floyd Dixon, Fattburger, The Five Blind Boys of Alabama, Lisa Haley, Wanda Jackson, No Doubt, the Paladins, Ann Peebles, Mick Taylor and many others.

Adams Avenue Unplugged, formerly the Adams Avenue Roots Festival, another free music festival, is held the last weekend of April.

=== Community organizations ===
The Normal Heights Community Planning Group (NHCPG) advises the city on neighborhood land-use issues, particularly local historical properties, zoning, traffic-calming, and neighborhood facilities such as parks and libraries. The Normal Heights Recreation Council advises the city on local park and recreation issue. The Adams Avenue Business Association operates the local business improvement district and sponsors major local festivals. Other community groups include the Normal Heights Community Association, the Normal Heights Cultural Council, the Normal Heights Community Development Corp., and the Friends of Normal Heights Canyons.

== Education ==
The community contains three public elementary schools, Adams Elementary School and Normal Heights Elementary School, run by the San Diego Unified School District. The public charter school San Diego Global Vision Academy opened in 2010. The neighborhood also houses St. Didacus Catholic School.

== Government ==
Normal Heights is a Mid-City Community and is part of City Council District 9, currently represented by Sean Elo-Rivera. The area is covered under the City of San Diego's Mid-City Communities Plan and is a part of the Mid-City Public Facilities Financing Plan.
