= Normal Heights fire =

1985 urban wildfire in San Diego, California

The Normal Heights fire was a destructive urban wildfire that broke out in the Normal Heights neighborhood of San Diego, California, on June 30, 1985. The fire burned about 300 acres, destroyed or damaged more than 100 structures, and displaced approximately 200 people. Officials later confirmed that the blaze was an act of arson.

== Fire and immediate impact ==
The fire began in a canyon near Litchfield Drive at about 11:54 a.m. and spread eastward through overgrown vegetation. Wind, steep terrain, and dry brush contributed to its spread into nearby residential areas.

According to city officials, the fire destroyed 64 homes, severely damaged 20 others, burned 18 outbuildings, and consumed 18 vehicles. The estimated property damage was $8.5 million, excluding personal belongings such as furniture and clothing.

There were no fatalities, though 18 firefighters were treated for smoke inhalation, eye irritation, and heat exhaustion. Approximately 200 people were displaced.

== Emergency response ==
Firefighters from five counties, the state of California, and the U.S. Navy responded. San Diego Fire Chief Roger Phillips criticized the five-hour delay in deploying California Department of Forestry air tankers, arguing that earlier deployment might have slowed the fire.

Low water pressure in the older neighborhood hindered firefighting efforts, forcing residents to rely on garden hoses in some areas.

== Later developments ==
Governor George Deukmejian declared a state of emergency, and local community groups, architects, and planners assisted with rebuilding efforts.

Rebuilding began soon after the fire, aided by insurance payments and federal assistance. Most of the destroyed homes were replaced within a year. Some were rebuilt at a larger scale or in different architectural styles. A year after the fire, some residents told the Los Angeles Times that the neighborhood still felt different despite the rebuilding.

After the fire, San Diego officials formed a task force to review fire hazards in canyon neighborhoods. The task force considered changes to landscaping practices, land-use regulations, and public education. Its recommendations included restrictions on highly flammable vegetation and guidelines for maintaining native plants near homes.

Investigations after the fire also examined delays in requesting and deploying aerial tankers. San Diego subsequently revised its procedures for requesting emergency aircraft.

At the time the Normal Heights fire was the worst brush fire in San Diego history. In the following year, city officials revised procedures for requesting aerial firefighting assistance and considered new standards for vegetation management and defensible space in canyon neighborhoods.

The arsonist was never identified.

== See also ==
- List of California wildfires
