= SS Alameda (1883) =

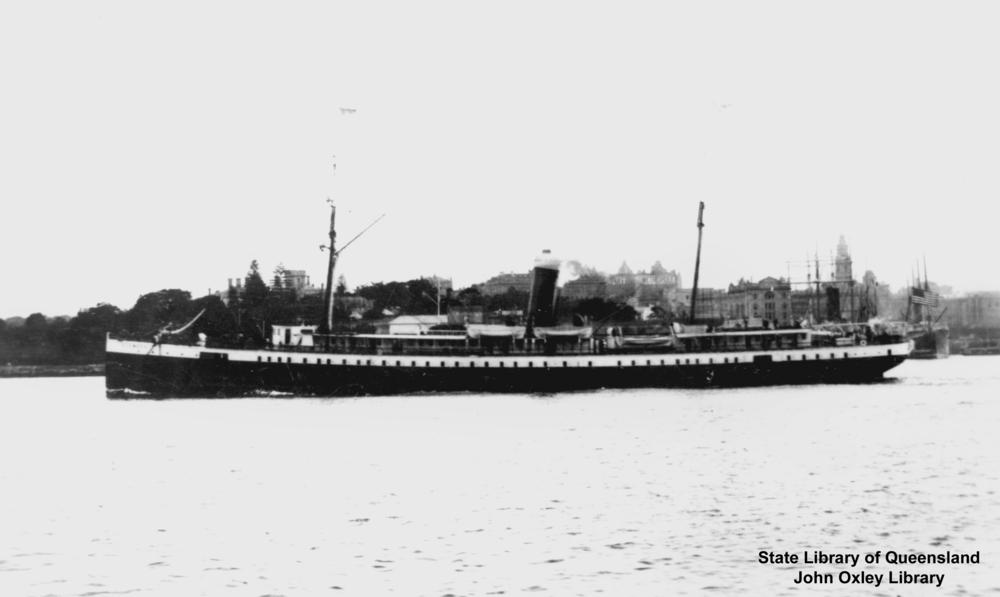
- Alameda

History

United States
- Name: Alameda
- Owner: Oceanic Steamship Co (1883–1910); Alaska Steamship Co (1910–31)
- Port of registry: New York (by 1930)
- Builder: William Cramp & Sons, Philadelphia
- Completed: 1883
- Acquired: Never
- Commissioned: Never
- Identification: US Official Number 106184; Code Letters KBML
- Fate: Burned down, 28 November 1931

General characteristics
- Type: passenger ship
- Tonnage: 3,158 GRT; tonnage under deck 2,936; 1,939 NRT
- Displacement: 5,000 tons
- Length: 314.0 ft (95.7 m) p/p 332 ft 5 in (101.32 m) o/a
- Beam: 41.0 ft (12.5 m)
- Draft: 22 ft 0 in (6.71 m)
- Depth: 17.3 ft (5.3 m)
- Installed power: 434 NHP; 3,500 ihp
- Propulsion: triple-expansion steam engine, single screw
- Speed: 15 knots (28 km/h)
- Crew: 52
- Sensors & processing systems: wireless direction finding

Note: This ship should not be confused with the motorboat Alameda, considered for World War I service as USS Alameda (SP-1040), but also never acquired or commissioned.

The USS Alameda (ID-1432) was a steamship used for runs from the West Coast of the United States to Hawaii.

The Alameda was an iron-hulled passenger liner that was built in 1883 by William Cramp & Sons at Philadelphia for the Oceanic Steamship Company. After the ship was completed in July 1883, eighteen-year-old Maggie Cramp, daughter of Joseph Cramp, played the piano at a reception; while disembarking, she slipped on the gangplank and drowned.

The Alaska Steamship Company bought her in 1910.

After the United States entered World War I in 1917, the U.S. Navy's 13th Naval District inspected her for possible naval service, and she was registered accordingly with the Naval Registry Identification Number (ID. No.) 1432; however, the Navy appears never to have acquired or commissioned her.

The Alameda remained in commercial use until she caught fire at a pier in Seattle on 28 November 1931. She was subsequently scrapped.

== See also ==
- SS Mariposa (1883), sister ship

== Gallery ==
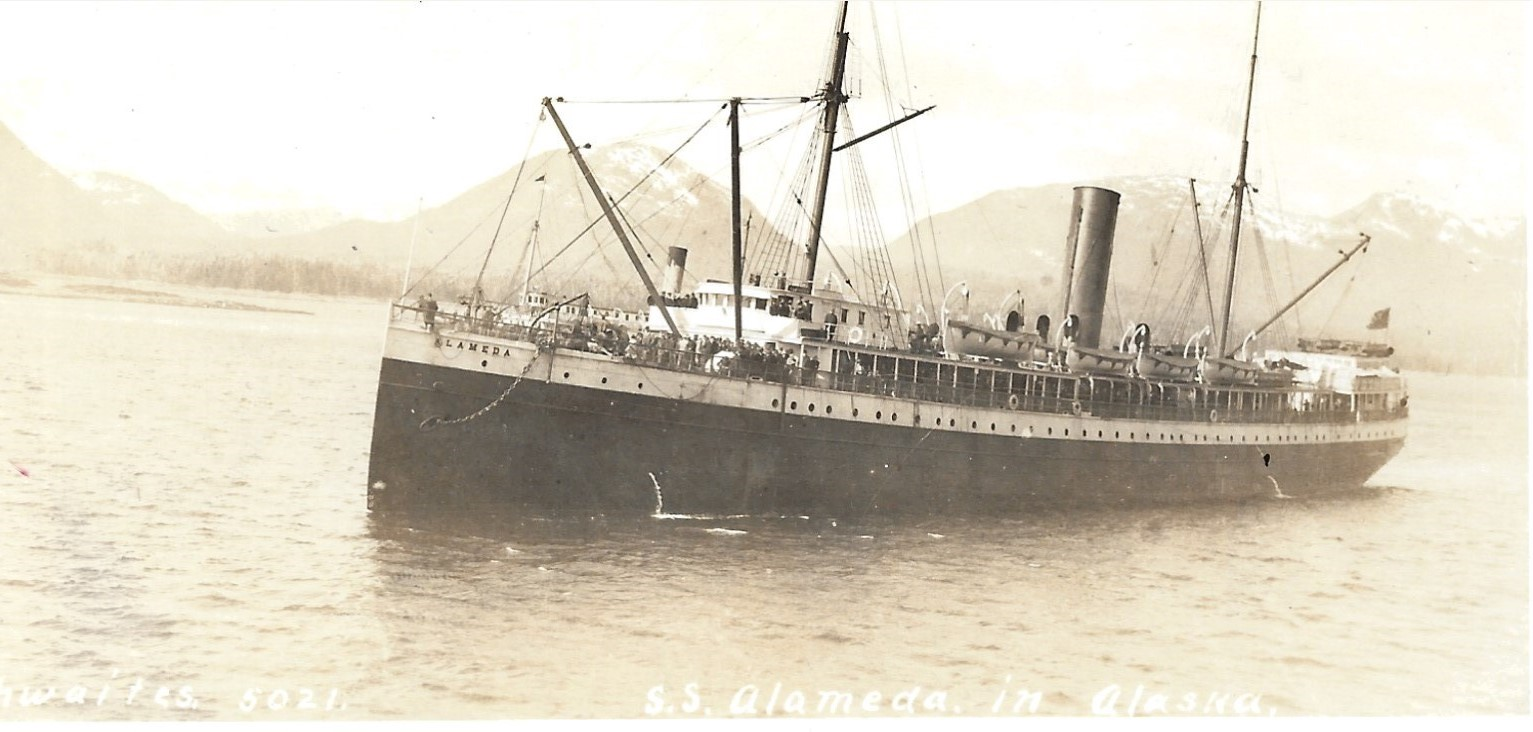
S.S. Alameda in service in Alaska, photo taken by John E. Thwaites
