= John Bach McMaster =

American historian (1852–1932)

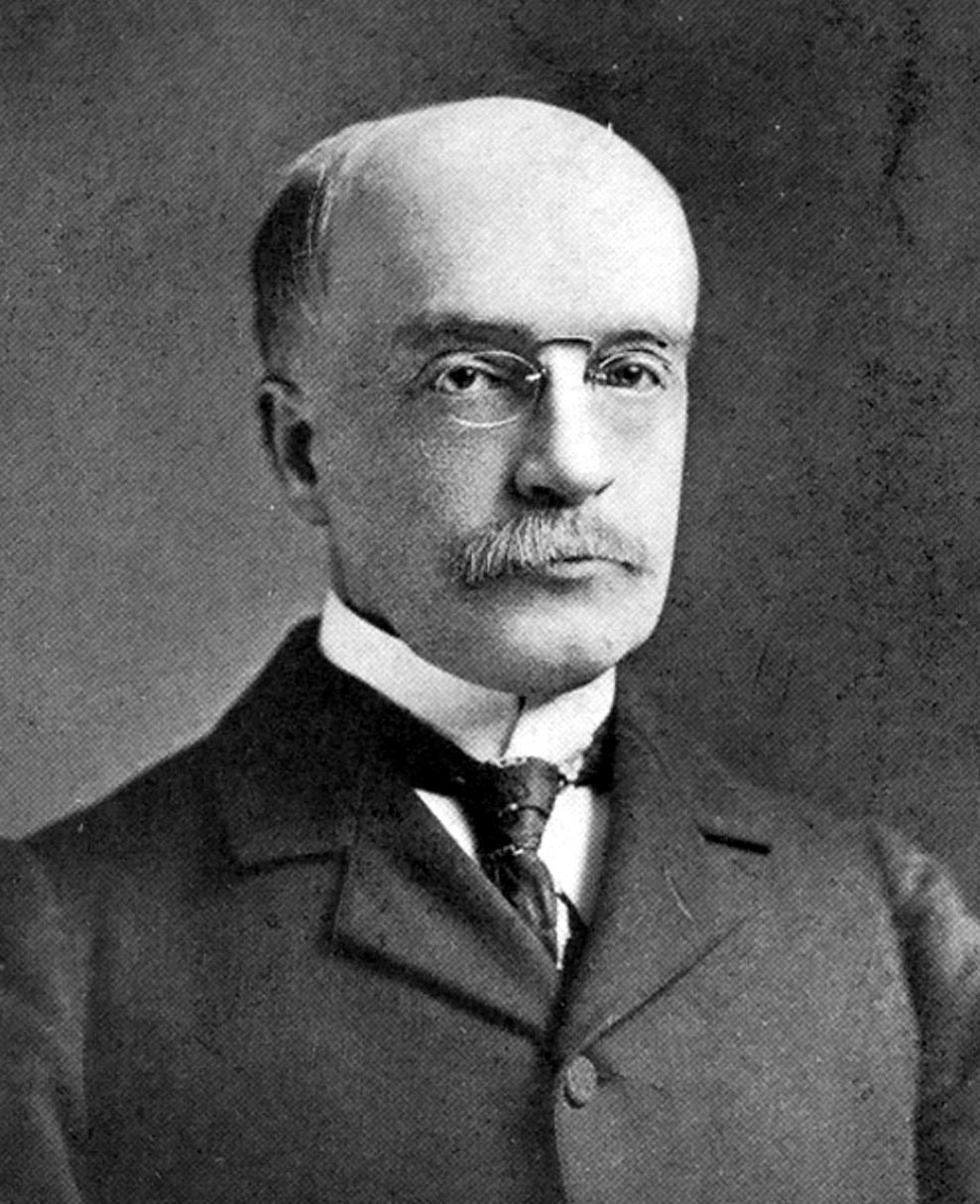
John Bach McMaster

John Bach McMaster (June 29, 1852 – May 24, 1932) was an American historian. He has been described as a leading American historian of his generation.

McMaster was born in Brooklyn, New York. His father, a native of New York, was a banker and planter at New Orleans at the beginning of the Civil War. He graduated from the College of the City of New York in 1872, worked as a civil engineer in 1873–1877, was instructor in civil engineering at Princeton University in 1877–1883, and in 1883 became professor of American history in the University of Pennsylvania. McMaster was elected a member of the American Antiquarian Society in 1884. McMaster was the second president of The Franklin Inn Club, serving from 1914 to 1930.

McMaster is best known for his History of the People of the United States from the Revolution to the Civil War (1883 sqq.), a valuable supplement to the more purely political writings of James Schouler, Von Holst and Henry Adams. He began working on it in 1873, having collected material since 1870. His A School History of the United States (1897) was an extremely popular textbook for many years. Besides these books and numerous magazine articles, he published Benjamin Franklin as a Man of Letters in the "Men of Letters" series (Boston, 1887). His historical work differed from standard practice in that it departed from an exclusively political focus to delve into social history and the lives of ordinary people and also in its use of news papers as sources.

In 1884, he was elected as a member of the American Philosophical Society.

== Works ==
- John Bach McMaster, Bridge and Tunnel Centres, 1875.
- John Bach McMaster, History of the People of the United States from the Revolution to the Civil War (8 volumes), 1883-.
- John Bach McMaster, Benjamin Franklin as a Man of Letters, 1887.
- John Bach McMaster, Outline of the Lectures of the Constitutional History of the United States, 1789–1889, 1889.
- John Bach McMaster, With the Fathers: Studies in the History of the United States, 1896.
- John Bach McMaster, The Origin, Meaning and Application of the Monroe Doctrine, 1896.
- John Bach McMaster, The University of Pennsylvania Illustrated, 1897.
- John Bach McMaster, A School History of the United States, 1897.
- John Bach McMaster, A Primary History of the United States, 1901.
- John Bach McMaster, History of the Expedition under the Command of Captains Lewis and Clarke (3 volumes), 1902-.
- John Fiske (1842–1901), John Bach McMaster (1852–1932), and John Henry Wright (1852–1908), Modern Development of the New World, 1902.
- John Bach McMaster, The Acquisition of Political, Social, and Industrial Rights of Man in America, 1903.
- John Bach McMaster, A Brief History of the United States, 1909.
- John Bach McMaster, The Life and Times of Stephen Girard, Mariner and Merchant, 1918.
- John Bach McMaster, The United States in the World War (3 volumes), 1918–1920.
