= Coronado, California =

City in California, United States

- City
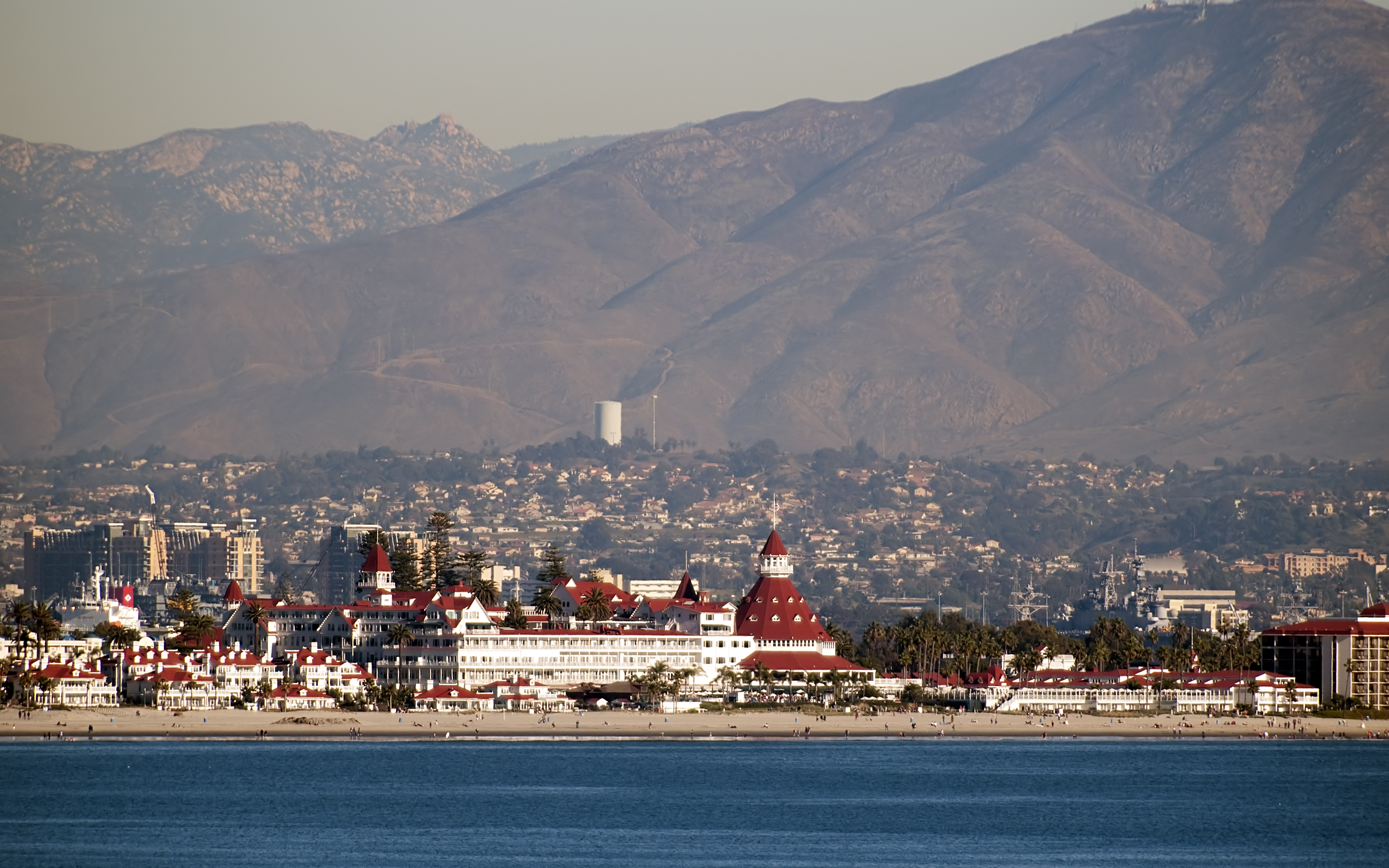
- Hotel del Coronado in December 2008

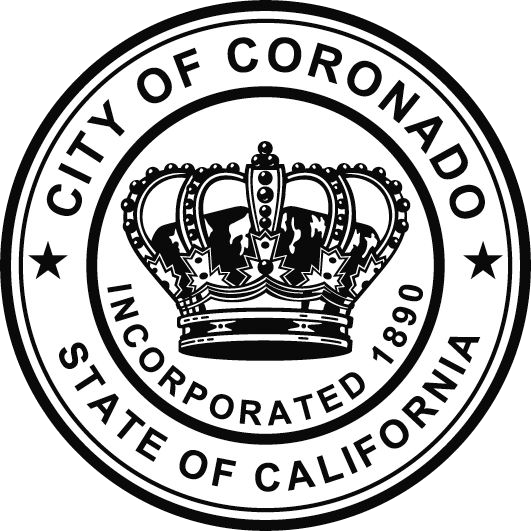
- Flag Seal
- Nickname: "The Crown City"
- Interactive map of Coronado, California
- Location in the United States Coronado (California) Coronado (the United States)
- Coordinates: 32°40′41″N 117°10′21″W
- Country: United States
- State: California
- County: San Diego
- Incorporated: December 11, 1890

Government
  - Type: Mayor-council
  - Mayor: John Duncan

Area
  - Total: 32.50 sq mi (84.17 km^{2})
  - Land: 7.81 sq mi (20.22 km^{2})
  - Water: 24.70 sq mi (63.96 km^{2}) 75.72%
- Elevation: 16 ft (5 m)

Population (2020)
  - Total: 20,192
  - Density: 2,586.9/sq mi (998.82/km^{2})
- Time zone: UTC-8 (Pacific)
  - Summer (DST): UTC-7 (PDT)
- ZIP codes: 92118, 92178
- Area code: 619
- FIPS code: 06-16378
- GNIS feature IDs: 1660513, 2410233
- Website: www.coronado.ca.us

Coronado (Spanish for "Crowned") is a beach city in San Diego County, California, United States, across San Diego Bay from downtown San Diego. It was founded in the 1880s and incorporated in 1890. Its population was 20,192 in 2020.

Coronado is a tied island which is connected to the mainland by a tombolo (a sandy isthmus) called Silver Strand. Along the coast of Southern California lie four islands that were spotted by Sebastian Vizcaino and his crew. They named them "Los Coronados". In the mid-1880s, businessmen bought the peninsula near Los Coronados with hopes to turn it into a resort. Later in 1886, the owners of this peninsula hosted a naming contest with the people resulting in the name "Miramar" winning, which was soon overturned due to the public not being satisfied with the name, so they borrowed from their cousin islands "Los Coronados" and named it "Coronado". Coronado is the Spanish term for "crowned" and thus it is nicknamed The Crown City. Its name is derived from the Coronado Islands, an offshore Mexican archipelago.

== History ==
Prior to European settlement, Coronado was inhabited by the Kumeyaay, who sustained fishing villages on the peninsula in North Island and on the Coronado Cays. As American settlers moved into the area, the Kumeyaay were pushed out of Coronado, with the last six Kumeyaay families deported to Mesa Grande Reservation in 1902.

Coronado was incorporated as a town on December 11, 1890. The community's first post office predates Coronado's incorporation, established on February 8, 1887, with Norbert Moser assigned as the first postmaster. The land was purchased by Elisha Spurr Babcock, Hampton L. Story, and Jacob Gruendike. Their intention was to create a resort community, and in 1886, the Coronado Beach Company was organized. By 1888, they had built Hotel del Coronado, and the city became a major resort destination. They also built a schoolhouse and formed athletic, boating, and baseball clubs.

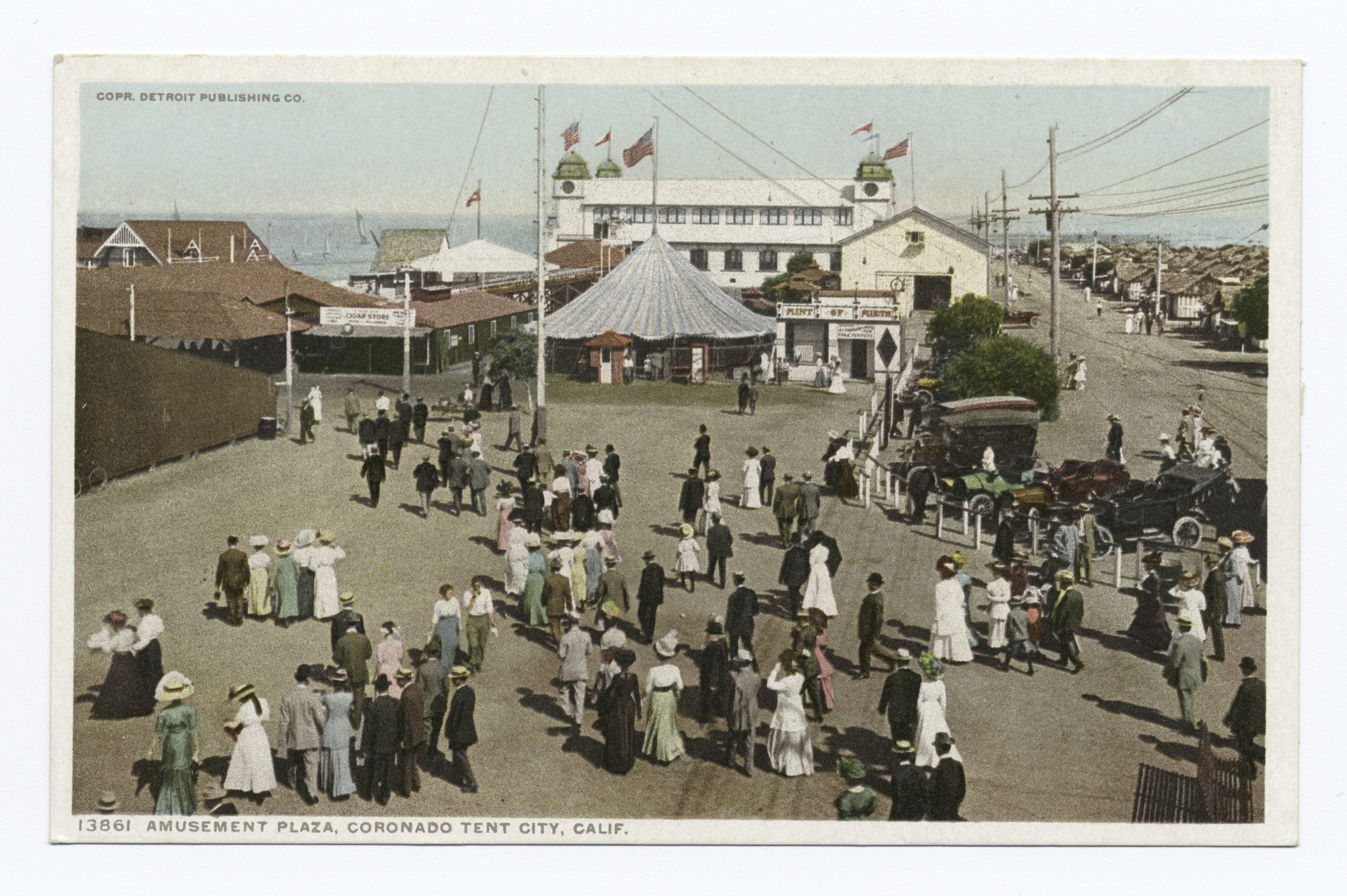
Amusement Park, Tent City

In 1900, a tourist/vacation area just south of Hotel del Coronado was established by John D. Spreckels and named Tent City. Spreckels also became the hotel's owner. Over the years, the tents gave way to cottages, the last of which was torn down in late 1940 or early 1941.

In the 1910s, Coronado had streetcars running on Orange Avenue. These streetcars became a fixture of the city until their retirement in 1939.

What is now the Naval Air Station North Island was the first US flying school, founded in 1911 by Glenn Curtiss. Curtiss was known for his engines, which set records in distance and speed. He started with motorcycle engines, which led him to aviation. Coronado's weather and protected bay were attractive and he gained a three-year lease to train military pilots. During this time he created a new type of ship-launched seaplane and an amphibious aircraft.

On New Year's Day 1937, during the Great Depression, the gambling ship SS Monte Carlo, known for "drinks, dice, and dolls", was shipwrecked on the beach about a quarter mile (400 m) south of Hotel del Coronado.

In 1946, an African-American man from Coronado named Alton Collier was forced off of a San Diego and Coronado ferry by white sailors. The case was ruled a suicide until 2024, when the Equal Justice Initiative declared it a lynching.

In 1969, the San Diego–Coronado Bridge was opened, allowing much faster transit between the cities than bay ferries or driving via State Route 75 along the Silver Strand. The bridge is made up of five lanes, one of which is controlled by a moveable barrier that allows for better traffic flow during rush hours. In the morning, the lane is moved to create three lanes going southbound towards Coronado, and in the evening it is moved again to create three lanes going northbound towards downtown San Diego.

In 2007, the Coronado Police Department and the city was sued in civil courts after a Coronado police officer in civilian clothes shot the professional football player Steve Foley multiple times.

== Geography ==
According to the United States Census Bureau, the city has a total area of 32.7 square miles (85 km^{2}); 7.9 square miles (20.5 km^{2}) of the city is land and 24.7 square miles (64 km^{2}) of it (75.72%) is water.

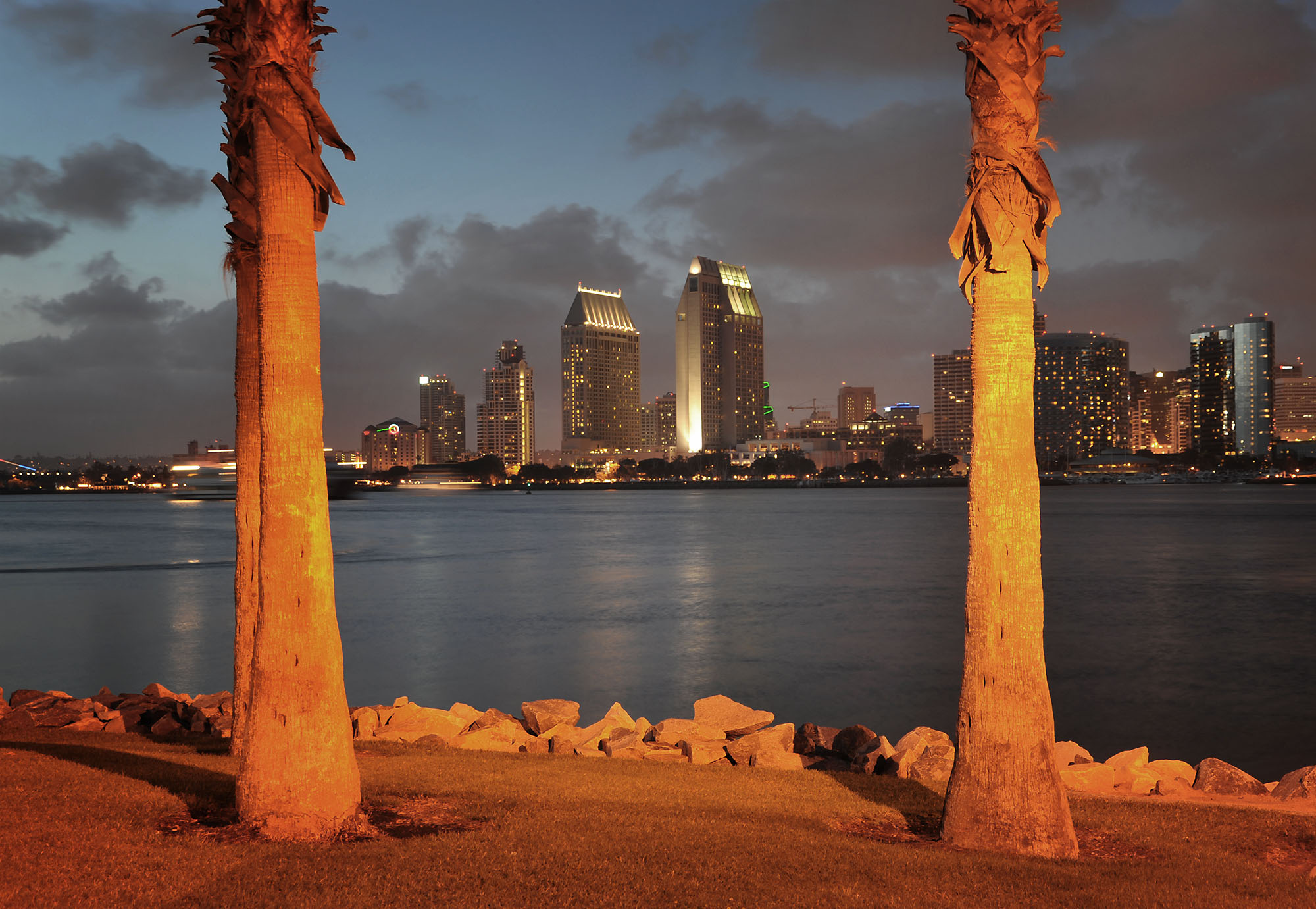
A view of San Diego from Coronado

Geographically, Coronado is a tied island connected to the mainland by a tombolo known as the Silver Strand. The Silver Strand, Coronado and North Island, form San Diego Bay. Since recorded history, Coronado was mostly separated from North Island by a shallow inlet of water called the Spanish Bight. The development of North Island by the United States Navy prior to and during World War II led to the filling of the bight by July 1944, combining the land areas into a single body. The Navy still operates Naval Air Station North Island (NASNI or "North Island") on Coronado. On the southern side of the town is Naval Amphibious Base Coronado, a training center for Navy SEALs and Special warfare combatant-craft crewmen (SWCC). Both facilities are part of the larger Naval Base Coronado complex. Coronado has increased in size due to dredge material being dumped on its shoreline and through the natural accumulation of sand. The "Country Club" area on the northwest side of Coronado, the "Glorietta" area and golf course on the southeast side of Coronado, most of the Naval Amphibious Base Coronado, most of the Strand Naval Housing, and most of the Coronado Cays (all on the south side of Coronado) were built on dirt dredged from San Diego Bay.

=== Climate ===
According to the Köppen climate classification system, Coronado has a semi-arid climate, abbreviated BSk on climate maps.

== Demographics ==
Historical population
Census	Pop.	Note	%±
1860	276		—
1870	229		−17.0%
1900	935		—
1910	1,477		58.0%
1920	3,289		122.7%
1930	5,425		64.9%
1940	6,932		27.8%
1950	12,700		83.2%
1960	18,039		42.0%
1970	20,020		11.0%
1980	18,790		−6.1%
1990	26,540		41.2%
2000	24,100		−9.2%
2010	24,697		2.5%
2020	20,192		−18.2%
2024 (est.)	18,031	▼	−10.7%
U.S. Decennial Census; 1860–1870 1880-1890; 1900 1910 1920; 1930 1940 1950; 1960 1970 1980; 1990 2000 2010; 2020

Coronado Bridge

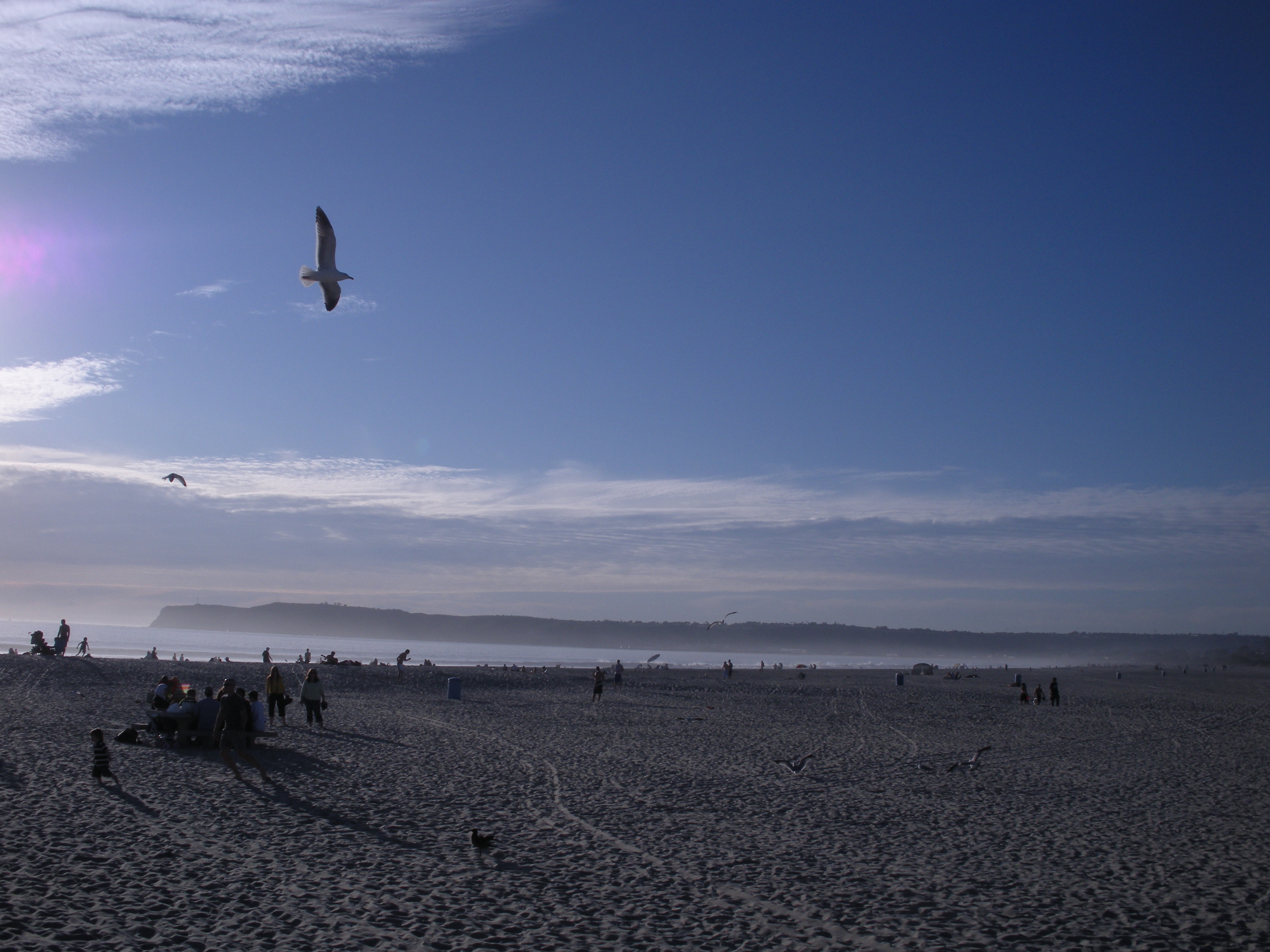
Coronado Beach in 2009

=== Racial and ethnic composition ===
Coronado city, California – Racial and ethnic composition Note: the US Census treats Hispanic/Latino as an ethnic category. This table excludes Latinos from the racial categories and assigns them to a separate category. Hispanics/Latinos may be of any race.
Race / Ethnicity (NH = Non-Hispanic)	Pop 2000	Pop 2010	Pop 2020	% 2000	% 2010	% 2020
White alone (NH)	18,937	15,016	14,275	78.58%	79.40%	70.70%
Black or African American alone (NH)	1,213	370	607	5.03%	1.96%	3.01%
Native American or Alaska Native alone (NH)	125	75	53	0.52%	0.40%	0.26%
Asian alone (NH)	875	547	613	3.63%	2.89%	3.04%
Native Hawaiian or Pacific Islander alone (NH)	68	51	41	0.28%	0.27%	0.20%
Other race alone (NH)	43	28	113	0.18%	0.15%	0.56%
Mixed race or Multiracial (NH)	470	523	1,084	1.95%	2.77%	5.37%
Hispanic or Latino (any race)	2,369	2,302	3,406	9.83%	12.17%	16.87%
Total	24,100	18,912	20,192	100.00%	100.00%	100.00%

=== 2020 census ===
As of the 2020 census, Coronado had a population of 20,192, with a population density of 2,587.1 inhabitants per square mile (998.9/km^{2}).

The census reported that 86.5% of the population lived in households, 13.1% lived in non-institutionalized group quarters, and 0.5% were institutionalized. Coronado was entirely urban, with 100.0% of residents in urban areas and 0.0% in rural areas.

There were 7,384 households, out of which 28.7% included children under the age of 18, 55.2% were married-couple households, 3.5% were cohabiting couple households, 14.3% had a male householder with no spouse or partner present, and 27.0% had a female householder with no spouse or partner present. About 28.1% of households were one person, and 14.5% were one person aged 65 or older. The average household size was 2.36, and there were 4,931 families (66.8% of all households).

The age distribution was 18.3% under the age of 18, 17.2% aged 18 to 24, 20.7% aged 25 to 44, 22.7% aged 45 to 64, and 21.0% aged 65 or older. The median age was 38.8 years. For every 100 females, there were 108.3 males, and for every 100 females age 18 and over, there were 110.1 males age 18 and over.

There were 9,573 housing units at an average density of 1,226.5 units per square mile (473.6 units/km^{2}). Of all housing units, 77.1% were occupied and 22.9% were vacant. Of occupied units, 50.3% were owner-occupied and 49.7% were occupied by renters; the homeowner vacancy rate was 1.9% and the rental vacancy rate was 5.2%.

=== Post-2020 estimates ===
In 2023, 66.2% of those aged 25 and over had a bachelor's degree or higher. According to a 2023 estimate, the median income for a household in the city was $135,056, and the median income for a family was $161,300. The per capita income was $79,771.

Real estate in the city of Coronado is very expensive. According to a recent county-wide ZIP code chart published in The San Diego Union-Tribune in August 2006, the median cost of a single-family home within the city's ZIP code of 92118 was $1,605,000. In 2010, Forbes.com found that the median home price in Coronado had risen to $1,840,665.

By 2023, the median home value was $2.2 million, with more than a quarter of households earning more than $200,000.

== Government and politics ==
Coronado is governed by a city council, which is presided over by a directly elected mayor. The mayor and councilmembers serve four-year terms. Council designates one of its members as Mayor Pro Tempore.

The current mayor of Coronado is John Duncan, who serves as the city's 52nd mayor.

Coronado has long been a Republican stronghold; in 2013, about 47% of voters were registered Republican, 25% Democratic, and 24% nonpartisan.

Prior to 2020, the resort city had voted for the Republican nominee in each presidential election since at least 1964. From 1968 to 1988, each Republican presidential candidate received over 70% of the vote. However the city has been trending Democratic in recent years, with each of the last four Republican presidential candidates receiving less than 60% of the vote. In 2016, Donald Trump won Coronado with a plurality of the vote, and Hillary Clinton received the largest share of the vote for a Democratic candidate since at least 1960. In 2020, Democratic nominee and former vice president Joe Biden won Coronado with 51.50% of the vote, becoming the first Democratic presidential nominee to carry the city in decades. This result was nevertheless significantly lower than his statewide vote share of 63.48%.

In the California State Legislature, Coronado is in the 39th senatorial district, represented by Democrat Akilah Weber Pierson, and in the 77th Assembly district, represented by Democrat Tasha Boerner. In the United States House of Representatives, Coronado is located in California's 50th congressional district, which has a Cook partisan voting index of D+14 and is represented by Democrat Scott Peters.

After California state law mandated that localities zone for affordable housing across the state, Coronado refused to comply with the law. Former mayor of Coronado Richard Bailey described the housing development as "central planning at its worst" and refused to submit a housing plan that allows for construction of the required amount of homes.

=== Coronado city vote by party in presidential elections ===
Year	Democratic	Republican	Third Parties
2024	52.28% 4,868	45.23% 4,212	2.49% 232
2020	51.50% 5,308	44.39% 4,575	4.11% 424
2016	45.90% 4,024	48.06% 4,213	6.05% 530
2012	39.04% 3,455	59.10% 5,230	1.85% 164
2008	41.73% 3,855	56.94% 5,260	1.33% 123
2004	36.26% 3,326	62.93% 5,773	0.81% 74
2000	32.39% 2,823	63.74% 5,556	3.87% 337
1996	31.16% 2,654	61.02% 5,197	7.82% 666
1992	26.99% 2,517	46.22% 4,310	26.78% 2,497
1988	27.21% 2,413	71.71% 6,360	1.08% 96
1984	21.86% 1,781	77.05% 6,278	1.09% 89
1980	18.09% 1,468	71.47% 5,799	10.44% 847
1976	27.87% 1,941	70.31% 4,897	1.82% 127
1972	23.50% 1,390	73.34% 4,338	3.16% 187
1968	24.27% 1,162	70.41% 3,371	5.33% 255
1964	36.86% 1,725	63.14% 2,955

== Tourism ==
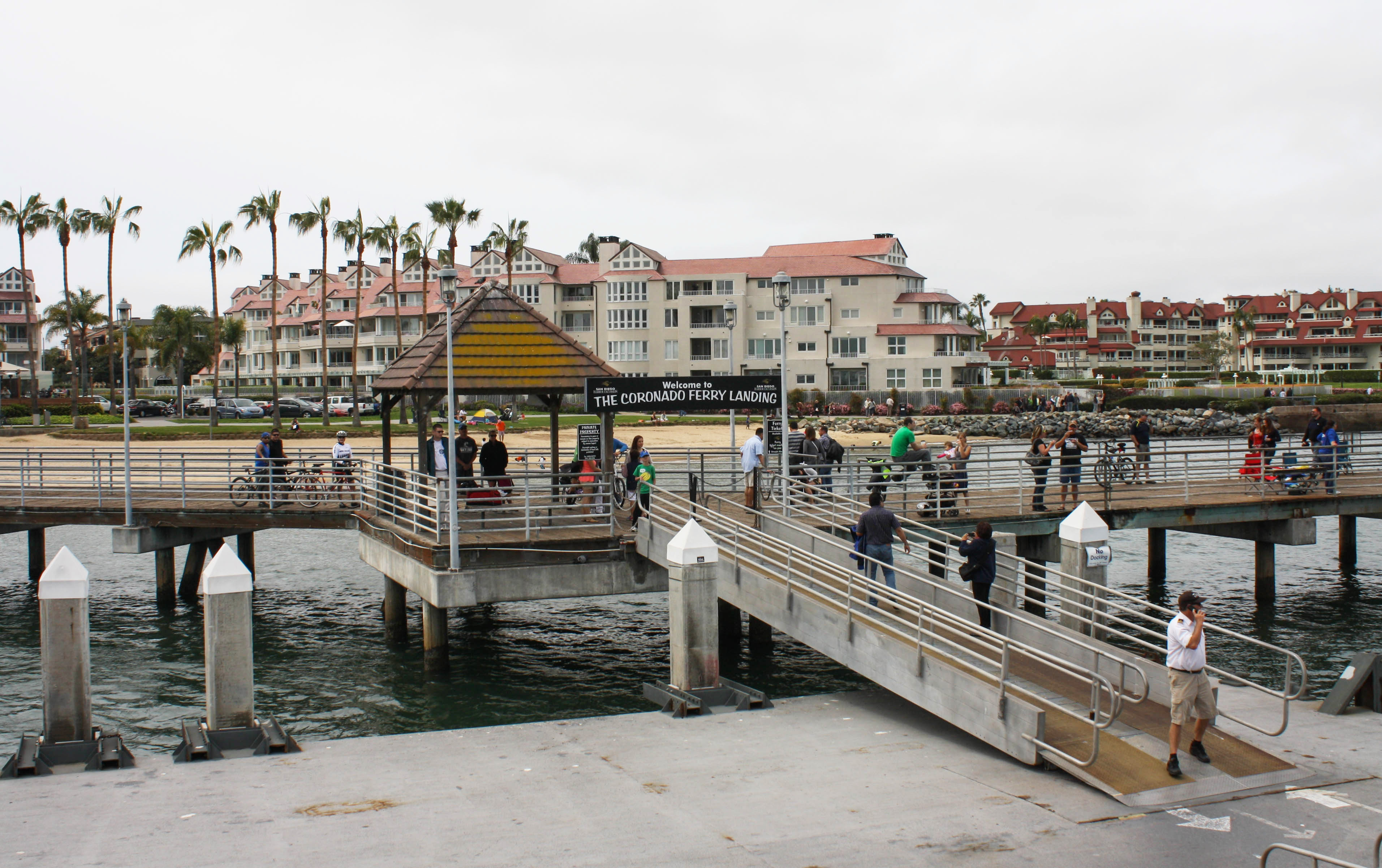
The Coronado Ferry Landing

Tourism is an essential component of Coronado's economy. This city is home to three major resorts (Hotel del Coronado, Coronado Island Marriott, and Loews Coronado Bay Resort), as well as several other hotels and inns. The downtown district along Orange Avenue, with its many shops, restaurants and theaters, is also a key part of the local economy. Many of the restaurants are highly rated and provide a wide variety of cuisine choices.

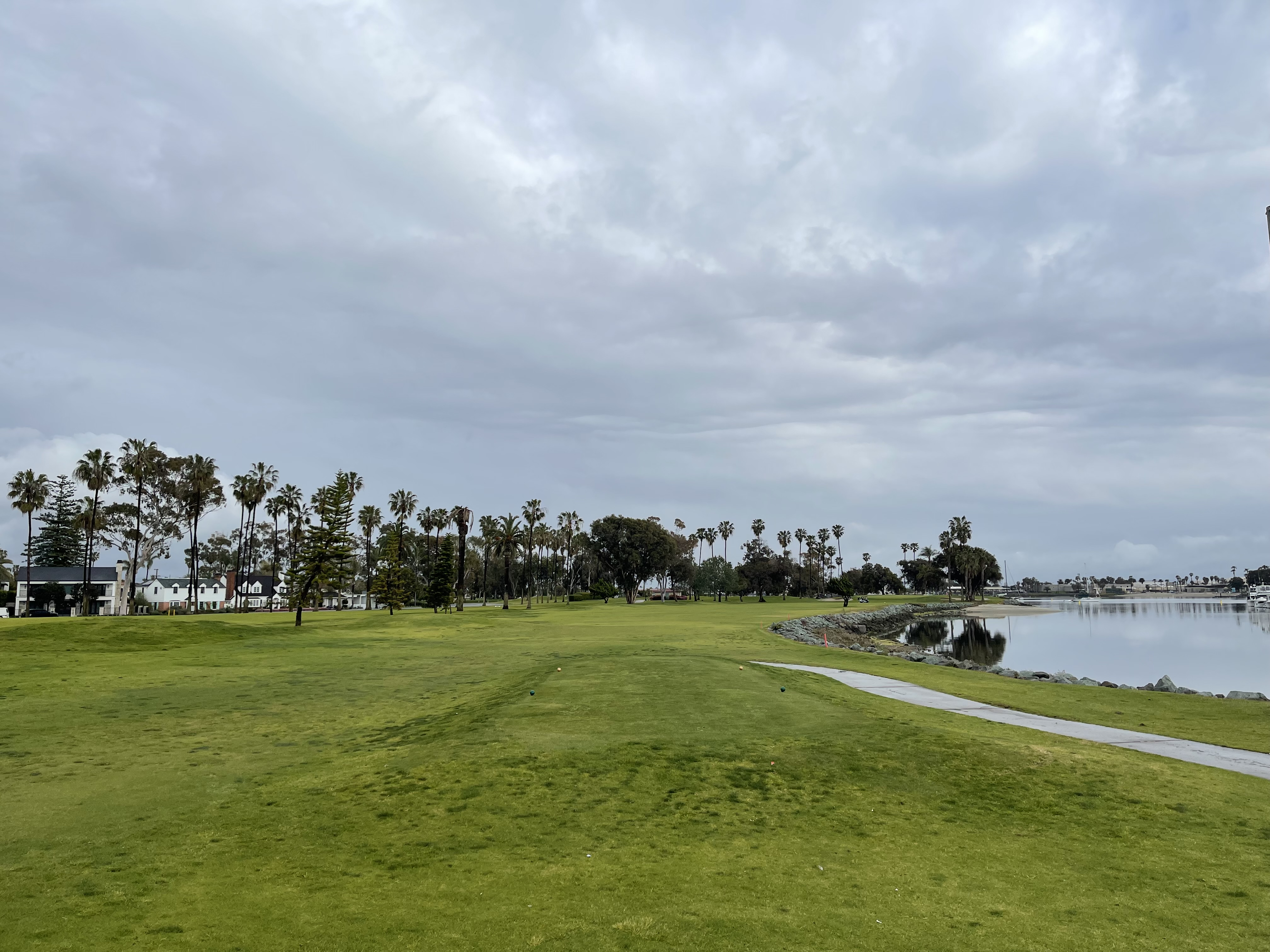
16th hole Coronado Golf Course

Golf on Coronado started in 1897 with a nine-hole golf course hosting the 1905 Southern California Open. Later, golf on Coronado migrated to a new site in the Southern portion of the island with 18 holes designed by Jack Daray Sr. Golf is a popular diversion on the island, entertaining 90,000 golf rounds annually.

In 2008, the Travel Channel rated Coronado Beach as the sixth-best beach in America.

Orange Avenue is where the new Baby Grand Hotel is located at.

== Hotel del Coronado ==
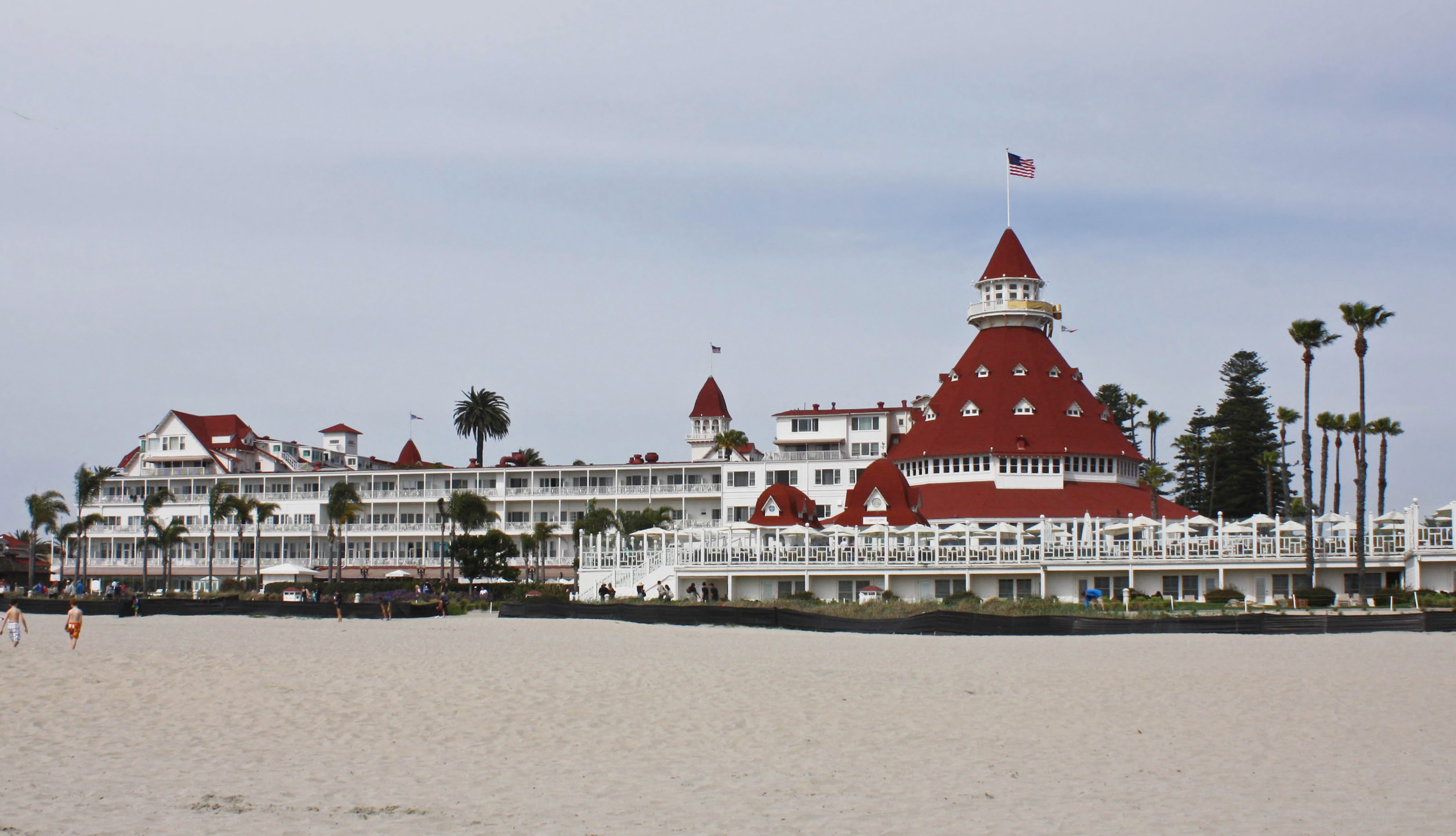
Hotel del Coronado from the beach

Hotel del Coronado, built in 1888, has been designated as a National Historic Landmark. Its guests have included American presidents George H. W. Bush, Jimmy Carter, Bill Clinton, Gerald Ford, Lyndon B. Johnson, Richard Nixon, Ronald Reagan, Franklin D. Roosevelt, and William Howard Taft, as well as Muhammad Ali, Jack Dempsey, Thomas Edison, Magic Johnson, Charles Lindbergh, Willie Mays, Babe Ruth, Oprah Winfrey, and Robert Downey. Actresses Mary Pickford and Marilyn Monroe also stayed here.

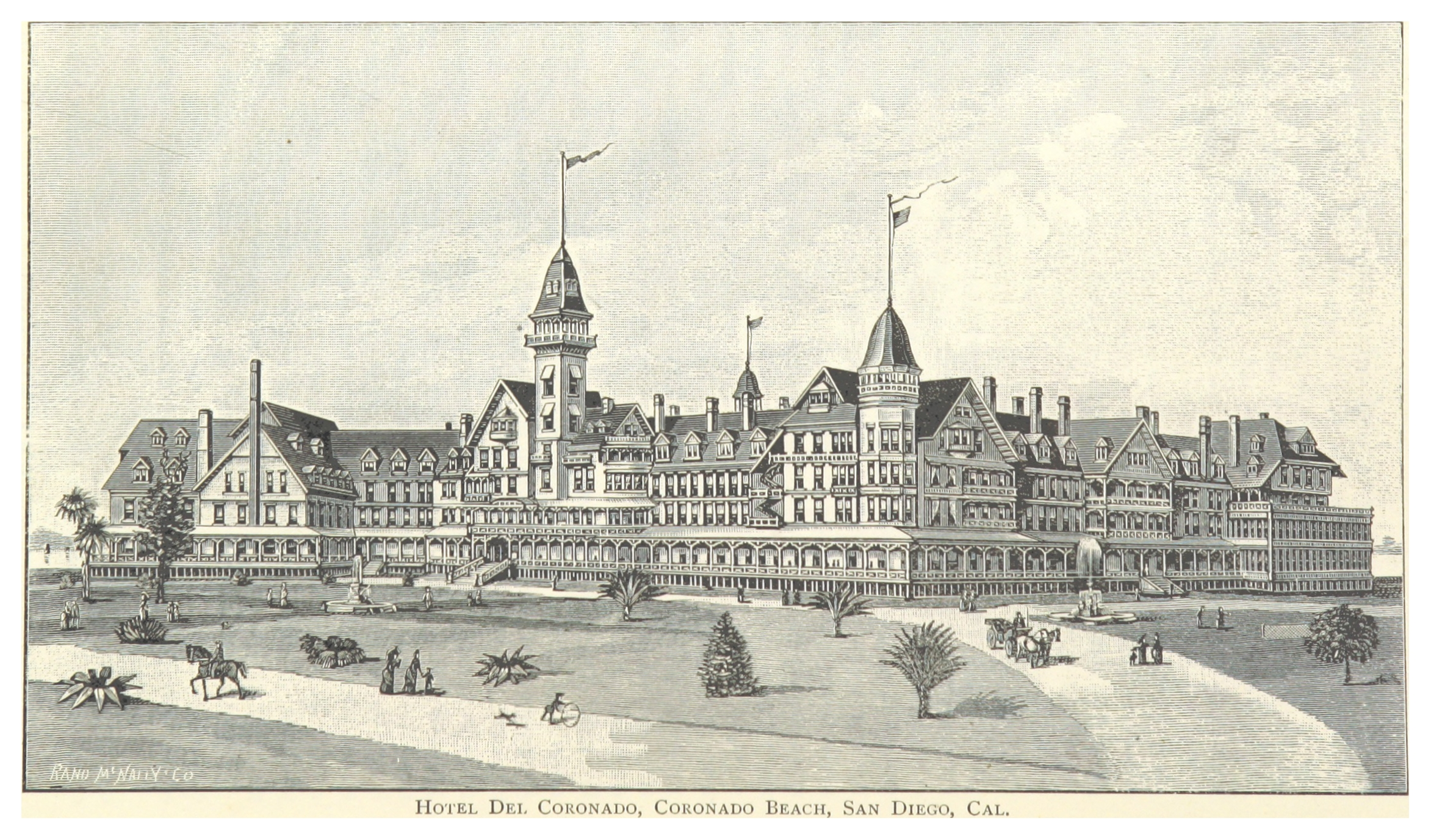
Hotel del Coronado, 1885

"The Del" has appeared in numerous works of popular culture and was said to have inspired the Emerald City in The Wonderful Wizard of Oz. It is rumored that the city's main street, Orange Avenue, was Baum's inspiration for the yellow brick road. Other sources say Oz was inspired by the "White City" of the Chicago World's Fair of 1893. Author L. Frank Baum would have been able to see the hotel from his front porch overlooking Star Park. Baum designed the crown chandeliers in the hotel's dining room.

Once owned locally, Hotel Del Coronado is now owned by Blackstone (60%), Strategic Hotels & Resorts Inc. (34.5%), and KSL Resorts (5.5%). When Strategic Hotels & Resorts Inc. bought its stake in 2006, the hotel was valued at $745 million; as of 2011, the hotel was valued at roughly $590 million.

== In popular culture ==
Scenes from Denzel Washington's film Antwone Fisher were shot in Coronado. Parts of Brian De Palma's film Scarface and Ron Howard's film Splash were shot at Coronado Beach. A film called Carbon featuring Whitney Wegman-Wood and Randy Davison was shot in Coronado near the restaurant Nado Republic.

== Schools ==
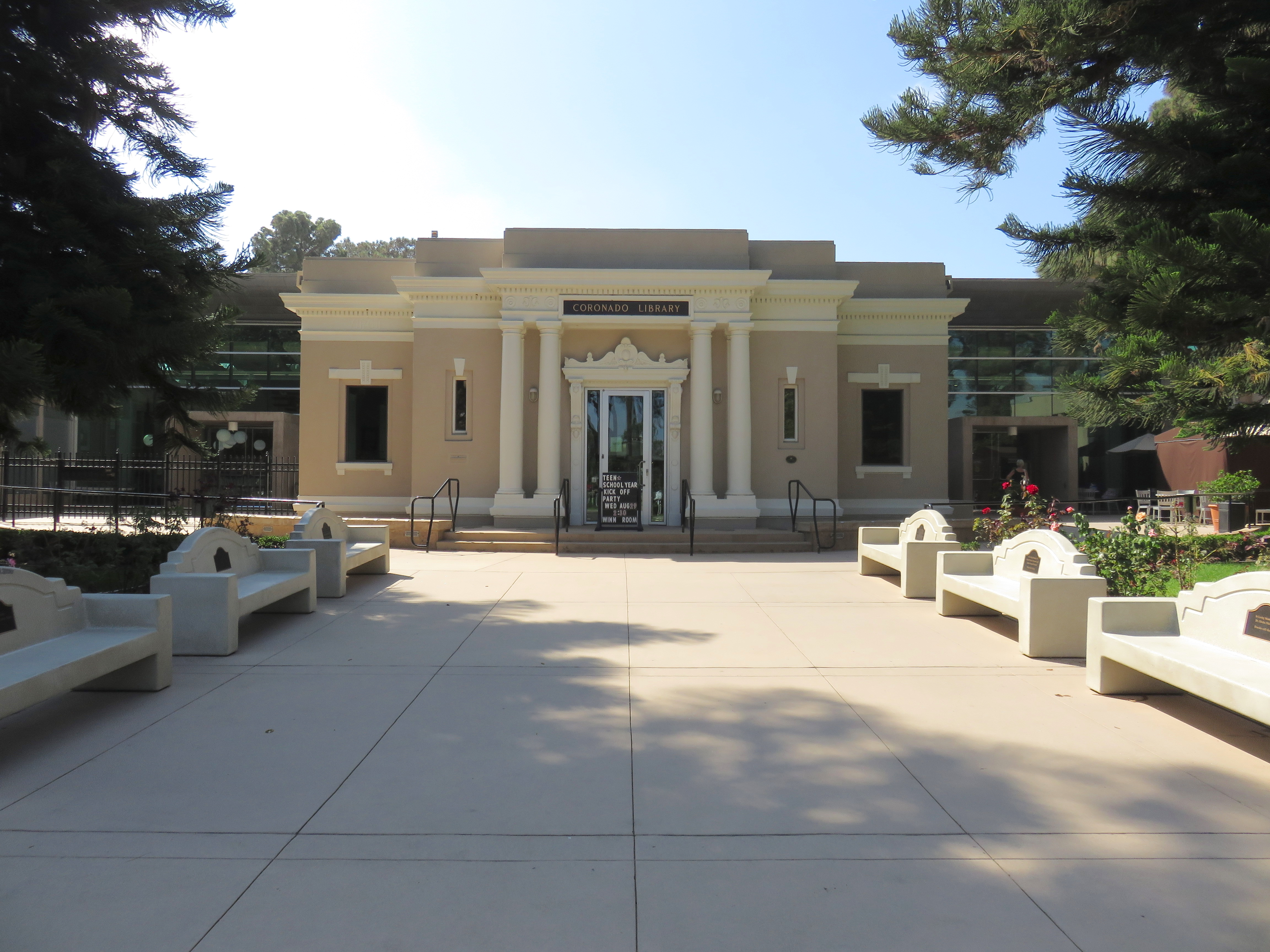
Coronado Public Library

Coronado Unified School District includes Coronado Middle School (CMS), Coronado High School, Silver Strand Elementary, and Village Elementary. Coronado School of the Arts, a public school-within-a-school, is located on the campus of Coronado High School. Among the city's private schools are Sacred Heart Parish School and Christ Church Day School.

== Economy ==
=== Top employers ===
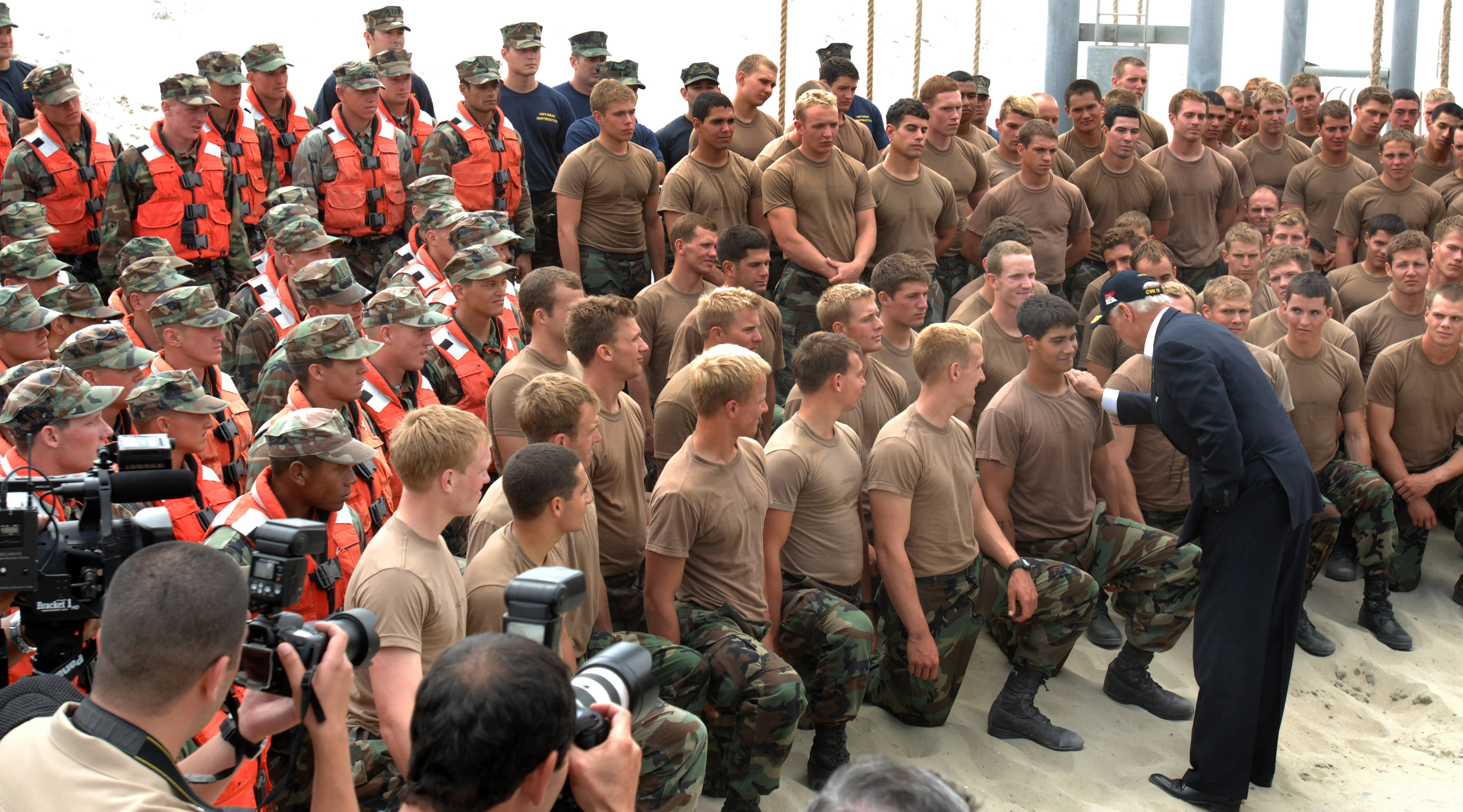
Vice President Joe Biden speaks to Navy SEAL trainees, NAB Coronado, 2009

According to the city's 2012 Comprehensive Annual Financial Report, the top 10 employers in the city are:

#	Employer	# of Employees
1	United States Navy (Naval Air Station North Island, et al.)	11,000–14,999
2	Hotel del Coronado	1,000–4,999
3	Loews Coronado Bay Resort	500–999
4	Sharp Coronado Hospital	500–999
5	City of Coronado	250–499
6	Coronado Unified School District	250–600
7	Coronado Island Marriott Resort	250–499
8	BAE Systems	100–249
9	Peohe's	100–249
10	Realty Executives Dillon	50–99

== Notable people ==
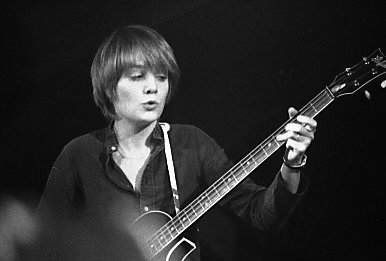
Tina Weymouth of Talking Heads, 1978

- Lisa Bruce – film producer
- Johnny Downs – child actor who played "Johnny" in the Our Gang series of short films from 1923 to 1926
- Christa Hastie – contestant on CBS Survivor Pearl Islands, Season 7, 2003
- Lloyd Haynes – actor and television writer, known for TV series Room 222
- Mary Beardslee Hinds – American First Lady of Guam.
- Mae Hotely – silent film actress who appeared in 85 films between 1911 and 1929
- Jim Kelly – martial artist and actor, starred in Enter the Dragon with Bruce Lee
- Genai Kerr – U.S. Water Polo Olympian and NCAA All-American
- Anita Page – silent film actress
- Orville Redenbacher – popcorn marketer
- Sarah Roemer – actress and model, starred in 2007's Disturbia with Shia LaBeouf
- Rodney Scott – Chief of United States Border Patrol
- Tim Thomerson – actor and comedian, known for his portrayal of Jack Deth in the Trancers film series
- Wende Wagner – actress
- William Witney – film director

=== Music ===
- Kevin Kenner – concert pianist
- Mojo Nixon – musician and radio host
- Nick Reynolds – founding member of The Kingston Trio
- George Sanger – video game music composer
- Paul Sykes – singer
- Scott Weiland – former lead singer of Stone Temple Pilots and Velvet Revolver.
- Tina Weymouth – bassist and vocalist of Talking Heads and Tom Tom Club

=== Commerce ===
- Charles T. Hinde – riverboat captain, businessman, original investor in Hotel del Coronado
- Doug Manchester – real estate developer and publisher of San Diego Union Tribune
- Orville Redenbacher – businessman behind eponymous brand of popcorn
- John D. Spreckels – transportation and real estate mogul
- Jonah Shacknai – (CEO of Medicis Pharmaceutical) and his girlfriend Rebecca Zahau
- Ira C. Copley – publisher, politician, and utility tycoon

=== Military ===
==== Army ====
- William P. Duvall, U.S. Army major general, retired to Coronado
- Townsend Griffiss, first American airman killed in Europe following the United States's entry into World War II
- Henry Delp Styer, US Army brigadier general, retired to Coronado

==== Marine Corps ====
- General Joseph Henry Pendleton, USMC – Mayor of Coronado from 1928 to 1930, namesake of Camp Pendleton
- Major General John H. Russell Jr., USMC – 16th Commandant of the Marine Corps, son of Rear Admiral John Henry Russell, USN and father of Brooke Astor, noted philanthropist.

==== Navy ====
- Captain Ward Boston, USN – World War II Navy fighter pilot, then attorney for the Naval Board of Review which investigated the 1967 USS Liberty Incident
- Admiral Charles K. Duncan – USN Supreme Allied Commander Atlantic
- Admiral Leon A. Edney – USN
- Admiral Thomas B. Fargo, USN – inspiration for fictional Captain Bart Mancuso in film The Hunt for Red October
- Alfred Walton Hinds - Naval officer and Governor of Guam.
- John S. McCain Sr. – grandfather of Arizona senator and U.S. presidential candidate John McCain
- Admiral George Stephen Morrison, USN – father of The Doors' lead singer, Jim Morrison
- Commander Alan G. Poindexter, USN – NASA astronaut and Navy test pilot
- Rear Admiral Uriel Sebree, USN – made two Arctic expeditions, was the second acting governor of American Samoa, and served as commander-in-chief of the Pacific Fleet
- Commander Earl Winfield Spencer Jr., USN – first commanding officer of Naval Air Station San Diego
- Vice Admiral James Stockdale, USN – Medal of Honor recipient and 1992 candidate for vice president with Ross Perot
- Jeffrey Trail, USN – LTJG and Gulf War veteran, opponent of don't ask, don't tell policy

=== Politics and government ===
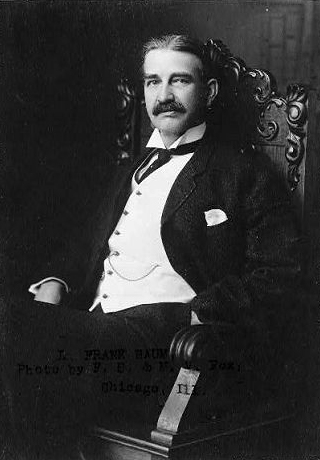
L. Frank Baum, c. 1901

- Brian Bilbray – Republican politician and member of the United States House of Representatives
- Alexander Butterfield – White House deputy assistant to Richard Nixon 1969–73, a key figure in Watergate scandal
- Don Davis – Florida politician
- Duncan Hunter – Congressman
- Ivan Getting – founding president of Aerospace Corporation and a division director of the MIT Radiation Laboratory
- M. Larry Lawrence – US Ambassador to Switzerland and owner of Hotel del Coronado
- Cindy Hensley McCain – wife of Sen. John McCain
- John McCain – U.S. Senator and 2008 Republican presidential candidate
- Nathan Oakes Murphy – Republican delegate to the U.S. House of Representatives from Arizona Territory and 14th governor of the Territory
- Dana Rohrabacher – Republican politician and member of United States House of Representatives
- Donald Rumsfeld – former Secretary of Defense
- George G. Siebels Jr. – first Republican mayor of Birmingham, Alabama, born in Coronado in 1913.
- Wallis Simpson, Duchess of Windsor, American-born wife of abdicated King Edward VIII of the United Kingdom

=== Sports ===
- Layne Beaubien – 2008 Olympic silver medalist in water polo
- Cam Cameron – offensive coordinator for NFL's Baltimore Ravens, San Diego Chargers
- Servando Carrasco – soccer player
- Chad Fox – Major League baseball pitcher for several teams, including Florida Marlins 2003 World Series championship team
- Ken Huff—former NFL player
- Fulton Kuykendall – former NFL player
- Jim Laslavic – former NFL linebacker
- Don Orsillo – play-by-play announcer for the San Diego Padres
- Gene Rock – former basketball player
- Sven Salumaa – former tennis player
- William Thayer Tutt – past president of International Ice Hockey Federation, member of Hockey Hall of Fame

=== Writers and poets ===
- L. Frank Baum – author of The Wizard of Oz, which in part was written while he resided on Coronado.
- Landis Everson – poet
