= Sitrick and Company =

American public relations firm

- Type: Sitrick and Company
- Industry: Public relations
- Founded: 1989; 37 years ago
- Founder: Michael Sitrick
- Headquarters: Los Angeles, California
- Services: Public relations, crisis communications
- Parent: Resources Global Professionals
- Website: www.sitrick.com

Sitrick and Company is a Los Angeles–based public relations firm founded, in 1989, by its chair and CEO, Michael "Mike" Sitrick. The company has established offices in New York City and Washington, DC. Since 2009, the company is owned by Resources Global Professionals (RGP), the operating arm of Resources Connection Inc., when it became a subsidiary of the newly formed Sitrick Brincko Group. Retired United States Army Lieutenant General H Steven Blum is among the firm's employees.

== 2009 acquisition ==
In October 2009, Sitrick and Company, with restructuring firm Brincko Associates, were acquired by Deloitte spin-off Resources Connection Inc., which had 2,700 employees, in a combined cash and stock deal worth $43.3 million. Sitrick and Company then had 45 staff members, who were largely former journalists of the Los Angeles Times, The Wall Street Journal, and other media organizations. The two purchased firms had a combined revenue of $24.4 million, in 2008, according to Resources Connection. The purchase combined the two subsidiaries as Sitrick Brincko Group. LLC. Mike Sitrick continued as head of the Sitrick and Company subsidiary after its purchase by Deloitte.

In 2010, two former employees filed suit in federal court regarding Sitrick's buyout of the Employee Share Ownership Plan's holdings in the company during 2008, shortly prior to the Resources Connection deal; the suit alleged that Sitrick paid an unreasonably low price for the ESOP's stake, causing losses to the former employees. Sitrick responded in court documents that an independent trustee, which had its own financial advisor and lawyers, had negotiated the price, and the case settled shortly after, with insurance companies providing settlement funds.

== Clientele ==
Sitrick and Company is known for its handling of famous, or controversial, clients. In 2009, it was estimated to have had 1000 clients. Its work earned Sitrick the title of "the king of crisis PR", and its founder, Sitrick, has been widely referenced as a "fixer".

In 2002, David Duchovny hired the firm to represent him to the media in his dispute with 20th Century Fox, regarding breach of contract relating to his work on The X-Files television show. Sitrick and Company arranged for a feature in Forbes regarding Fox's vertical monopoly, to pressure Fox to settle with Duchovny.

The Roman Catholic Archdiocese of Los Angeles hired the firm, in 2012, regarding the diocese's sexual abuse scandal.

Sitrick advised Roy E. Disney and Stanley Gold in the orchestration of their campaign to remove Michael Eisner as chairman of Walt Disney, in 2003. The campaign led to 43 percent of Disney shareholders withholding their support from Eisner, who later stepped down voluntarily."

In 2006, Hewlett-Packard (HP) and its departing chairwoman Patricia C. Dunn hired the firm to handle media relations regarding HP's 2006 leak-investigation crisis.

Paris Hilton used the company's services after she was released from a brief stay in jail.

Steven Page, of Barenaked Ladies, hired the firm in 2008, following his drug arrest.

Medicis Pharmaceutical CEO Jonah Shacknai hired the firm, following the 2011 death of Rebecca Zahau.

In late January 2013, it was revealed that the firm had been hired by Papa John’s CEO John Schnatter, in mid-November of the previous year, to ask journalists and bloggers to delete Obamacare comments he had made claiming that the price of pizza would increase by 11 cents. The firm spent several months doing this, boasting that most journalists complied. Sitrick and Company helped compose an op-ed for Schnatter, published in the Huffington Post, as well as rebuttals to subsequent reports of a decrease in Papa John's brand perception.

On June 19, 2014, Sitrick and Company began representing South Korean fugitive Yoo Byung-eun. After a failed attempt from Yoo's public relations company, Ahae Press, to deny a number of the assertions made about Yoo in a June 17 The Diplomat article by John Power, titled "The Cults of South Korea". Power claimed that Sitrick and Company was hired and asked sections of the piece to be removed. Sitrick and Company had also previously distributed a press release by Ahae Press.

In October 2017, Sitrick and Company were hired by Harvey Weinstein, following news reports regarding the Harvey Weinstein sexual abuse allegations; his subsequent firing by The Weinstein Company; and the resignation of attorney Lisa Bloom. As of April 2018, it was announced, that Sitrick and Company was no longer representing Weinstein, and that his new PR firm was Herald PR, New York.

In February 2026, following the release of the Epstein files by the U.S. Department of Justice, it was reported that Michael Sitrick had been in contact with Jeffrey Epstein and had advised him on communications and public relations in 2011. In 2015, the firm and Epstein entered into a dispute over unpaid invoices.
