= Death of Rebecca Zahau =

2011 death in Coronado, California, United States

Coordinates: 32.6830°N 117.1815°W

- Date: July 13, 2011; 15 years ago
- Time: c. 6:45 a.m.
- Location: Spreckels Mansion, Coronado, California, U.S.
- Deaths: 1
- Coroner: County of San Diego Medical Examiner's Department

Rebecca Mawii Zahau (March 15, 1979 – July 13, 2011), also known as Rebecca Nalepa, was a Burmese American woman who was found hanging at the beach house home of her boyfriend in Coronado, California, United States, on July 13, 2011, and pronounced dead by first responders called to the residence. Her death occurred two days after 6-year-old Max Shacknai, the son of her boyfriend Jonah Shacknai, had fallen from the staircase of the same property. At the time she died, Max was in critical condition in the hospital. Zahau and her then teenaged sister, Xena, were the only known people present at the time of Max's fall. Subsequently on July 16, 2011, Max Shacknai died of his injuries.

San Diego Sheriff Bill Gore announced on September 2, 2011, that Zahau's death was a suicide while the younger Shacknai's death had been ruled an accident, and that neither was the result of foul play.

Members of Zahau's family disputed this finding and filed a US$10 million (equivalent to $12.9 million in 2025) wrongful death lawsuit against numerous named and unnamed (listed as 50 generic "Does") defendants, before reducing their focus to Jonah Shacknai's brother Adam. In April 2018, having heard evidence which only had to meet the less stringent standards of a civil case, the jury in that civil trial found Adam Shacknai responsible for Zahau's death and awarded the Zahau family a judgment totaling $5.2 million (equivalent to $6.6 million in 2025).

Within two weeks of the conclusion of the civil trial, the San Diego County Sheriff's Office began a review of its investigation and resubmitting to the County of San Diego Medical Examiner's Department for it to further review. In November 2018, having reexamined all the evidence, and noting that the Zahau family refused to submit its supposed evidence to assist in the review, the Chief Medical Examiner reported that the extensive investigative findings had been "correctly concluded", and restated that the "cause and manner of" Zahau's death was suicide. The Zahau family, knowing that Adam Shacknai was appealing the civil judgment arguing procedural errors and juror misconduct, immediately launched a public relations campaign accusing the county officials of making an incorrect decision. In February 2019, prior to final arguments in Shacknai's appeal being presented to the judge, the Zahau family chose to enter a settlement for $0.6 million judgment (equivalent to $0.8 million in 2025), resulting in the civil case being dismissed with prejudice and vacating the original $5.2 million judgment.

== Background ==
Rebecca Zahau (born March 15, 1979), was of Burmese immigrant origin. She was born in Falam, Chin State, a town in the Chin Hills in northwestern Burma (or Myanmar), to her father Khua Hnin Thang and mother Zung Tin Par (or Pari). After living in Nepal and Germany, Zahau moved to the United States about ten years before her death.

Zahau came from a family of Chin ethnicity and was raised as a Protestant. As of 2011, her parents and most family members lived in Saint Joseph, Missouri. She had an older sister, Mary Zahau-Loehner; a younger sister, Snowem Horwath, who lived in Germany as of 2011; and a teenage sister, Xena Zahau, among other siblings.

In August 2009, Zahau was arrested for shoplifting after stealing US$1,000 (equivalent to $1,500 in 2025) worth of jewelry from a Macy's in Phoenix, Arizona, to which she pled guilty. In 2002, she married 36-year-old nursing student Neil Nalepa of Scottsdale, Arizona; they divorced in February 2011. She worked as an ophthalmic technician until quitting in December 2010.

In 2008, Zahau began dating Jonah Shacknai, the CEO of Medicis Pharmaceutical, while she was still married to Nalepa. In 2010, Shacknai was the ninth-highest-paid CEO in Arizona, earning $6.4 million. He had two previous marriages. His first marriage to Kimberly James resulted in a divorce and a three-year custody fight over the couple's two children. He had a son, Maxfield Aaron "Max" Shacknai (born June 7, 2005), with second wife Dina Romano.

== Overview ==
=== Max's death ===
On July 11, 2011, Zahau, Max, and Zahau's teenaged sister, Xena, were at the Ocean Boulevard Beach House Mansion (built for John D. Spreckels and referred to in coverage as the Spreckels Mansion (Note: In contemporaneous coverage the property at 1043 Ocean Blvd is referred to as the "Spreckels Mansion", but this is not the same as the Spreckels Mansion (San Francisco))) in Coronado, California, which Shacknai used as a summer estate. At some point during that day, Max fell face-first over a second-floor banister, suffering injuries to his spinal cord and facial bones, the former of which affected his heart rate and breathing. Zahau said she was in the bathroom at the time; she found Max moments later, and Xena called 9-1-1. Max was not breathing and unresponsive, and was taken to Rady Children's Hospital in San Diego. He died on July 16 due to brain damage caused by oxygen deprivation resulting from his injuries.

On July 26, investigators ruled Max's death as an accident, speculating that he somehow tripped. However, a trauma doctor who examined the child prior to his death and autopsy stated to police that he did not believe the injuries from his fall were consistent with the cardiac arrest and brain swelling experienced by him, suggesting that Max may have suffocated prior to his fall.

=== Zahau's death ===
On July 12, 2011, Zahau dropped off Xena at the airport for her flight back to Missouri, and then picked up Jonah Shacknai's brother, Adam, who had just arrived on a flight from Memphis, Tennessee. Zahau, Jonah, and Adam ate dinner with a friend named Howard that evening. Zahau and Adam returned to the home, while Jonah reportedly kept a vigil at Max's bedside with the child's mother, Dina Romano; he would leave the hospital to recuperate at a nearby Ronald McDonald House. There were reports of loud music coming from the beach house later that night.

On the morning of July 13, at roughly 6:45 a.m., Adam stated that he found Zahau's nude body hanging from a balcony, with her wrists and ankles bound and her hands behind her back. He called 9-1-1 at 6:48 a.m., then sent a text message to his brother to inform him of the news. He cut down Zahau's body before the police arrived. Medics attempted to revive her, but pronounced her dead at the scene. Police initiated forensic and toxicology testing on her body as part of an autopsy to determine the cause of death. Speculations of foul play began early on in the case; however, investigators were unable to find any other DNA at the scene besides Zahau's. On September 2, the San Diego County Sheriff's Department formally announced their finding that Zahau's death was a suicide.

=== Evidence considered ===
Zahau's autopsy results revealed four instances of head trauma, about which investigators and outside commentators expressed various theories. San Diego Medical Examiner Jonathan Lucas stated that "because there was evidence that she went over the balcony in a non-vertical position, she may have struck her head on the balcony on the way down." Werner Spitz, an expert witness who testified during the trial of Casey Anthony, said it was a possibility, stating, "When the body first dropped, she doesn't necessarily jump to her death, so she would drop directly downward and she could easily hit against the side of the structure from which she is hanging." However, he noted that to draw stronger conclusions he would have preferred to see what the body looked like before the wrist bindings were removed. Forensic consultant Dr. Maurice Godwin expressed doubt, stating, "The chances of bumping into the railing, going over the balcony and hitting your head four times is highly unlikely."

A second autopsy on Zahau was conducted by pathologist Dr. Cyril Wecht at her family's request. Wecht testified that he believed fractures in Zahau's throat were caused by manual strangulation, not by suicidal hanging. He further stated that he thought Zahau's death "was a homicide." An attorney for Zahau's family stated that other inaccuracies were found with the Sheriff's Department investigation, including evidence that indicated that Zahau was sexually assaulted before her death.

Family members expressed suspicions for why Zahau's hands and feet were bound. San Diego Sheriff Roy Frank stated, "There are documentations of incidents throughout the country where people have secured their feet and hands as well to commit suicide," to prevent themselves from changing their minds. Police re-enacted the scenario in an effort to determine whether it would have been possible for Zahau to bind herself in that fashion, and showed a video demonstration in which a woman wrapped a rope around her hands several times in front of her, slipped one hand out of the binding, then placed her hands behind her back, rebound them, and tightened the bindings with the aid of a string similar to the one which police found in Zahau's hands.

A message had been painted on the door of the room leading to the balcony below where police found Zahau's body; according to Zahau's ex-husband Nalepa, it read, "She saved him, can he save her." Officials initially declined to confirm this. In media comments, Sheriff Gore only stated that it was "not a clear suicide note"; however, investigators took it as further evidence of suicide. Zahau liked to paint as a hobby and had signed her paintings in the past; her siblings contended that the message did not match her handwriting. Nalepa also stated the note "did not appear to be something [Zahau] would have written."

Police served Verizon and AT&T with search warrants to obtain cell phone billing records, and took Zahau's Samsung Focus cell phone as evidence. According to AT&T records, from roughly 8 p.m. until 10, Zahau talked and texted with her older sister Mary, who confirmed that Xena had arrived home safely. At 10:48 p.m., Zahau received a text from Nina Romano, the twin sister of Jonah Shacknai's ex-wife, who wanted to stop by the house and talk about Max's accident. Zahau did not reply to that message. Police said Zahau checked her voicemail a few hours later, at 12:50 a.m., and listened to a message. Billing records do not show who left that message. Police stated it was a message regarding the worsening of Max's condition, but declined to confirm at that time who left the message; Mary stated that police told her it was from Jonah. The message was deleted, meaning that police and Zahau's family never heard the contents of the message.

Investigators initially did not attempt to power up or operate the cell phone, fearing that they might overwrite evidence contained in its memory. Instead, they tried to determine whether forensic software was available which would allow them to examine that model of phone. On August 15, unable to identify any such technology, a detective turned on the phone and conducted a manual search, finding that the voicemail message was not stored on the phone. They did not request that AT&T try to retrieve the deleted message from its servers. Later, on September 21, an investigator announced that they would be using "new technology" to copy the phone's data for further investigation. In early October, investigators completed their second examination of the phone, stating that they did not uncover any additional information and would soon return it to Zahau's family.

== Reactions ==
=== Public and media ===
Zahau and Max's deaths drew intense public and media scrutiny. On July 14, 2011, Medicis had its sharpest one-day decline in stock price since February. News of the investigations received international coverage in various countries including New Zealand, Finland, Spain, and the U.K. throughout July and August.

In early September, various Forbes writers, including true crime writer Cathy Scott and lawyer Victoria Pynchon, expressed doubts about the investigators' conclusions; Pynchon described the ruling as an "embarrassing public blunder." The Daily Beast published a column by trial lawyer Roy Black, in which he criticized "half-baked theories" about Zahau's death, in particular stating the lack of DNA evidence: "How could anyone do all this without leaving behind a scintilla of microscopic evidence? They would have to have been wearing a full rubber suit or some type of space suit and levitated over the scene." He called on the media and public to "stop calling it murder."

On September 19, 2011, it was reported that local Coronado author Kathleen McKenna would be writing a book on the case; McKenna expressed doubts that Zahau's death was a suicide.

=== Family ===
Family members and people close to Zahau expressed doubt that her death was suicide. Her younger sister, Snowem Horwath, insisted that, "Becky did not commit suicide. My sister was murdered." Her former trainer also stated that, "She was always happy [and] always smiling when she came in. I didn't see a problem or anything like that." Family members disputed police characterizations of Zahau as depressed, describing her instead as a happy person. Furthermore, they state that Zahau believed as a Christian that suicide was wrong. After the suicide ruling, Nalepa was quoted as stating, "I would not believe Rebecca would commit suicide. It's out of character."

However, Sheriff Gore, who investigated the death, stated of the family's reluctance to accept the suicide ruling, "We laid out the case extensively to them in Missouri to answer their questions, and it's unfortunate [Zahau's sister] can't accept the results." On September 7, the family launched the website JusticeForRebecca.org, seeking donations to fund their own investigation into Zahau's death. The site states: "It was obvious that the Sheriff's Department had worked too hard to paint this picture of suicide and they were not about to let the Zahaus ruin it." In late September, they continued to demand that the case be re-opened.

On September 20, 2011, Jonah Shacknai wrote a letter to California Attorney General Kamala Harris requesting a state review of the investigation. Shacknai himself did not doubt the findings of investigations, but said he hoped a review would bring "confidence, comfort and resolution" to others close to Zahau. However, Chief Assistant Attorney General Dane Gillette replied the following day, stating that "we must decline your invitation to review this investigation at this time." On September 30, family members appeared on NBC's Today and called for an independent investigation by the state attorney general's office.

=== Lawyers and public relations personnel ===
Zahau's family hired Seattle attorney Anne Bremner, who derided the medical examiner's conclusions, stating, "This would be the first case in the history of the world that a woman killed herself like this ... It's ridiculous on the face of it." Dan K. Webb of Winston & Strawn LLP, a lawyer for Jonah Shacknai, alleges that other statements of Bremner's imply that Shacknai used his wealth and profile to improperly influence the investigation. He sent a cease and desist letter to Bremner warning her that certain statements of hers constituted defamation, as well as being "highly insensitive on a human level" and contributing to "the harsh and unkind glare of a national media frenzy." However, Jim Edwards of BNET suggested it was unlikely that Shacknai would actually sue, as it would simply bring more publicity to the case; he expected that the situation effectively "leaves the Zahau family to continue their claims unchallenged."

Shacknai hired public relations firm Sitrick and Company to represent him the week after Zahau's death. In response to media inquiries, a Sitrick and Company employee stated that he had hired the firm to handle his large volume of incoming calls in the days after the deaths, to give him time to grieve and make arrangements for the funerals. Sitrick and Company executives later held discussions with journalists who they believed had made errors in their reporting on the case.

== 2018–2019 civil case and official review ==
Members of Zahau's family disputed the finding that she had died by suicide, and filed a US$10 million (equivalent to $12.9 million in 2025) wrongful death lawsuit against numerous named and unnamed (including 50 generic "Does") defendants, before reducing their focus to Jonah Shacknai's brother Adam. In April 2018, having heard evidence which only had to meet the less stringent standards of a civil case, the jury in that civil trial found Adam Shacknai responsible for Zahau's death and awarded the Zahau family a judgment totaling $5.2 million (equivalent to $6.6 million in 2025).

Within two weeks of the conclusion of the civil trial, the San Diego County Sheriff's Office – using officers not involved in 2011 – began a review of its investigation and resubmitted to the County of San Diego Medical Examiner's Department for it to further review. In November 2018, having reexamined all the evidence, and noting that the Zahau family refused to submit any of its supposed evidence to assist in the review, the Chief Medical Examiner reported that the extensive investigative findings had been "correctly concluded", and restated that the "cause and manner of" Zahau's death was suicide. The Zahau family, which knowingly ignored the Sheriff's and Chief Medical Examiner's request to provide its civil case evidence to aid in the review, and knowing that Adam Shacknai was appealing the civil judgment, immediately launched a public relations campaign accusing the county officials of making an incorrect decision.

In February 2019, Adam Shacknai's appeal went before the court, with the defense arguing procedural errors and juror misconduct. Prior to final arguments being presented to the judge, the Zahau family chose to enter a settlement for $600,000, resulting in the civil case being dismissed with prejudice and vacating the original $5 million judgment.
