= Celina Mikolajczak =

American battery engineer and amateur astronomer

Celina J. Mikolajczak is an American mechanical engineer known for her work in industry on the development of improved electric batteries, especially for electric vehicles. She is Chief Battery Technology Officer at Lyten, and a member of the board of advisors at Voltaiq. She is also known for her discoveries as an amateur astronomer when she was a student.

== Education and astronomy ==
Mikolajczak is one of three children of Alojzy A. Mikolajczak, an aerospace engineer specializing in compressors and jet engines. After graduating in 1987 from Coronado High School, near San Diego, California, she studied engineering and applied sciences as an undergraduate at the California Institute of Technology (Caltech), originally intending to follow her father into aerospace engineering.

She discovered several asteroids in 1988, including 5256 Farquhar, and in 1989, when she was a sophomore at Caltech, she gained time on the Palomar Observatory to search for more. Instead, she became the first to spot supernova SN 1989N, in NGC 3646, a spiral galaxy in the constellation Leo. She later cited Eleanor F. Helin, her faculty mentor on this project, as her most influential female role model at Caltech.

After graduating from Caltech in 1991 and working in the oil industry, she went to Princeton University, where she earned a master's degree in mechanical engineering, focusing on the efficiency of internal combustion engines.

== Career in battery engineering ==
Mikolajczak began working at consulting firm Exponent in 1999. Her interest in batteries began there with work on the safety and failure modes of the lithium-ion rechargeable batteries used in consumer electronics. She was hired in 2012 by Tesla, Inc., where she became head of Cell Quality and Materials Engineering. After six years at Tesla, in 2018, she moved to Uber as Director of Battery Engineering, ostensibly as part of an effort to develop electric flying cars.

She became vice president for engineering and battery technology at Panasonic Energy of North America, a branch of Panasonic that supplies batteries to Tesla, in 2019. Next, in 2021, she became vice president for manufacturing at QuantumScape, another electric car battery supplier, only to leave after less than a year over a "management style mismatch". She took her present position at Lyten in 2022, working there on lithium–sulfur batteries.

== Book ==
Mikolajczak is a coauthor of the book Lithium-Ion Batteries Hazard and Use Assessment (with Michael Kahn, Kevin White, and Richard Thomas Long, Springer, 2012). Originally produced by Exponent as a report for the National Fire Protection Association, it reviews the literature on the subject, assesses the potential hazards of these batteries, and "lays out a research approach toward evaluating appropriate facility fire protection strategies". Subsequent experiments based on that approach tested the flammability of these batteries and the effectiveness of building sprinkler systems at battling their fires.
