= Robert Farquhar =

Robert Farquhar may refer to:

- Robert Townsend Farquhar (1776–1830), British colonial governor
- Robert D. Farquhar (1872–1967), American architect
- Robert W. Farquhar (1932–2015) NASA engineer, trajectory specialist
