= 5256 Farquhar =

Main-belt asteroid

Discovery
- Discovered by: E. F. Helin; C. Mikolajczak; R. Coker
- Discovery site: Palomar Obs.
- Discovery date: 11 July 1988

Designations
- Named after: Robert W. Farquhar (NASA specialist)
- Alternative designations: 1988 NN · 1955 HK
- Minor planet category: main-belt · Eunomia

Orbital characteristics
- Epoch 4 September 2017 (JD 2458000.5)
- Uncertainty parameter 0
- Observation arc: 61.27 yr (22,379 days)
- Aphelion: 3.0639 AU
- Perihelion: 2.0426 AU
- Semi-major axis: 2.5532 AU
- Eccentricity: 0.2000
- Orbital period (sidereal): 4.08 yr (1,490 days)
- Mean anomaly: 46.478°
- Mean motion: 0° 14^{m} 29.76^{s} / day
- Inclination: 14.956°
- Longitude of ascending node: 219.35°
- Argument of perihelion: 88.805°

Physical characteristics
- Dimensions: 11.990±0.126 km 12.09 km (calculated); 12.949±0.140 km
- Synodic rotation period: 11.513±0.001 h
- Geometric albedo: 0.1275±0.0198; 0.148±0.020; 0.21 (assumed)
- Spectral type: S
- Absolute magnitude (H): 11.8 · 11.9 · 12.3 · 12.41±0.63

5256 Farquhar, provisional designation 1988 NN, is a stony Eunomian asteroid from the middle regions of the asteroid belt, approximately 12 kilometers in diameter. It was discovered on 11 July 1988, by American astronomers Eleanor Helin, Celina Mikolajczak and Robert Coker at the Palomar Observatory in California. The asteroid was later named for American NASA specialist Robert W. Farquhar.

== Orbit and classification ==
Farquhar is a member of the Eunomia family, the most prominent family in the intermediate main-belt, which mostly consists of stony S-type asteroids. It orbits the Sun in the central main-belt at a distance of 2.0–3.1 AU once every 4 years and 1 month (1,490 days). Its orbit has an eccentricity of 0.20 and an inclination of 15° with respect to the ecliptic. The first observation was made at the U.S. Goethe Link Observatory in 1955, extending the asteroid's observation arc by 33 years prior to its discovery.

== Physical characteristics ==
=== Rotation period ===
In November 2013, a rotational lightcurve of Farquhar was obtained from photometric observations at the Phillips Academy Observatory (I12), Massachusetts, and at the HUT Observatory (H16), Colorado. The bimodal lightcurve gave a rotation period of 11.513 hours with a very low brightness variation of 0.07 in magnitude (U=2). A low brightness amplitude typically indicates a rather spheroidal shape.

=== Diameter and albedo ===
According to the surveys carried out by NASA's Wide-field Infrared Survey Explorer with its subsequent NEOWISE mission, Farquhar measures 12.0 and 12.9 kilometers in diameter and its surface has an albedo of 0.148 and 0.128, respectively. The Collaborative Asteroid Lightcurve Link assumes an albedo of 0.21, derived from the family's largest member and namesake, 15 Eunomia, and calculates a diameter of 12.1 kilometers with an absolute magnitude of 11.9.

== Naming ==
This minor planet was named for American NASA mission design specialist Robert W. Farquhar (1932–2015). At the Goddard Space Flight Center, he designed low-cost spacecraft and missions to explore the Solar System.

Farquhar was known for his international collaborations and for designing missions to comets and minor planets using inventive alternative trajectories. The approved naming citation was published by the Minor Planet Center on 10 November 1992 (M.P.C. 21134).
