= Coronado Unified School District =

School district in California, United States

Address
- 201 Sixth Street Coronado, California, 92118; United States

District information
- Type: Public
- Grades: K–12
- Superintendent: Karl Mueller
- NCES District ID: 0609870

Students and staff
- Students: 2,608 (2020–2021)
- Teachers: 135.59 (FTE)
- Staff: 149.54 (FTE)
- Student–teacher ratio: 19.23:1

Other information
- Website: www.coronadousd.net

Coronado Unified School District (CUSD) is a public school district based in Coronado in San Diego County, California. It includes one high school, one middle school, and two elementary schools as well as several specialized and unconventional schools. It is governed by a five-member elected board.

CUSD includes Coronado High School, Coronado Middle School, Silver Strand Elementary, and Village Elementary. Coronado School of the Arts, a nationally recognized public school-within-a-school (conservatory), resides on the high school campus. Crown Preschool, a fee-based school, operates as an inclusion model for some of our special needs children.

The CUSD boundaries include almost all of the City of Coronado and small sections of the city limits of San Diego. There are approximately 4500 students of K-12 age living in Coronado; 3100 currently attend the Coronado public schools. There are several preschools, some home schools, and two private Christian schools. The boundary includes Naval Amphibious Base Coronado and Naval Air Station North Island.

== Services ==
The Brian Bent Memorial Aquatic Complex (BBMAC) is managed by CUSD which coordinates student and community activities and rents out aquatic services to swimmers and water polo teams from around the world.

== Controversy ==
On June 19, 2021, the high school basketball team competed against Orange Glen High School in a regional championship game. Following the game, at least two Coronado High School students hurled tortillas at members of their predominantly Latino opponents. The District's board unanimously voted to fire high school head basketball coach J. D. Laaperi following the incident. The board issued a formal apology on August 19.

== Schools ==
- Coronado High School, 9 — 12
- Coronado School of the Arts (CoSA), 9 — 12
- Palm Academy-Alternative High School
- Coronado Middle School, 6 — 8
- Silver Strand Elementary School, K — 5
- Coronado Village Elementary School, K — 5
- Crown Preschool
- Coronado Adult Education and ROP
