= Coronado School of the Arts =

Art school in Coronado, California

Coordinates: 32°41′30.27″N 117°10′43.07″W

- Coronado, California; United States of United States

Information
- Type: Public school
- Established: 1996
- School district: Coronado Unified School District
- Director: Shane Michael Schmeichel
- Grades: Grades 9–12
- Website: http://www.cosasandiego.com

Coronado School of the Arts (CoSA) is a school-within-a-school in Coronado, California. It is located on the campus of Coronado High School. The school currently enrolls 155 students, of which nearly 70% comes from outside Coronado. CoSA is largely an after-hours program with a focus on the arts, in which students take academic courses at Coronado High School in the morning.

The school offers classes in classical and contemporary dance, musical theater and drama, instrumental music, technical theater, visual art, and digital media and filmmaking. It has Ph.D.s on its faculty and what The San Diego Union-Tribune calls "a formidable fund-raising auxiliary", the CoSA Foundation.

== History ==
The idea for the school materialized in 1993. The school was founded in 1996 by Kris McClung and had 60 students when it opened it doors in 1996. In 2007, CoSA unveiled a $25 million theater arts complex that includes a 640-seat main-stage theater, a black-box theater, scene shop, music and drama rooms, administrative offices, and a fly loft.

In 2005, four evacuees of Hurricane Katrina relocated from the damaged New Orleans Center for Creative Arts.

== Departments ==
- Musical Theater and Drama
- Technical Theater
- New Media (Digital Arts/Film)
- Music
- Dance
- Visual Arts

== Performances ==
CoSA generally puts on two musicals and one play every school year, with many dance, instrumental music, art, and digital media shows/exhibits in between.

== CoSA Foundation ==
The Coronado School of the Arts Foundation provides the oversight and fundraising apparatus for CoSA. Private funding, in the form of donations, covers about half of CoSA's operating budget. The remaining money is provided by the Coronado Unified School District, and through special state and federal grants.
