= Coronado High School (California) =

Coordinates: 32°41′30.38″N 117°10′43.13″W

Location
- 650 D Ave; Coronado, California 92118; United States

Information
- Type: Public school
- Established: 1913
- School district: Coronado Unified School District
- Principal: Karin Mellina
- Staff: 55.35 (FTE)
- Grades: Grades 9-12
- Student to teacher ratio: 18.05
- Campus type: open (grades 9-12)
- Colors: Green, Black, White
- Athletics conference: Islander Sports Foundation(ISF)
- Mascot: Islander
- Website: chs.coronadousd.net

Coronado High School (CHS) is a public high school in Coronado, California. It is the only high school in the Coronado Unified School District. The Coronado School of the Arts (CoSA) is located on the campus of CHS.

The California Department of Education gave it a California Distinguished School award in 2011 and two Model Continuation High School awards in 2014 and 2018. The boundary includes Naval Amphibious Base Coronado and Naval Air Station North Island.

== History ==
Coronado High School was established in 1913. In 1939, the original building was knocked down and rebuilt as part of Franklin Delano Roosevelt's Works Progress Administration. It was renovated again in 1961 and 2006.

In the 1970's, a group of students led by former Spanish teacher Lou Villar developed what became a $100-million dollar worldwide drug smuggling operation.

In 2008, the school was named a National Blue Ribbon School. CHS was the only school in San Diego County to win the award. In 2016, CHS was ranked 433rd nationally and 70th amongst California high schools in the USNews list of "Best High Schools", out of more than 27,000 public high schools. It was awarded the New American High Schools designation in 1998. It offers Advanced Placement Classes.

In 2023, the football team added girls to the roster for the first time.

== Sports ==
Coronado Sports, with the exception of Water Polo, Swimming, Tennis, Volleyball, Golf, Basketball, Cross Country, Baseball, and Softball are played at Niedermeyer Field which was completed in 2000. The Field, which hosts Football, Boys and Girls Soccer, and Boys and Girls Lacrosse was upgraded to field turf in 2005. The campus includes an aquatics complex named the Brian Bent Memorial Aquatics Complex., Three Coronado High School graduates played on the United States waterpolo team for the 2008 Olympics.

=== Tortilla throwing incident ===
On June 20, 2021, the boys' basketball team forfeited the CIF Division 4A Regional Basketball Championship after members of the team threw tortillas at their predominantly Latino opponents from Orange Glen High School during a victory celebration after the championship game. The move, which had previously been condemned by the League of United Latin American Citizens, prompted an investigation by the San Diego County’s Human Relations Commission. The Coronado Unified School District apologized for "racism and classism" and fired the head coach over the incident. A 40-year-old alumni of the school who had no children of his own on the team or at the school claimed that he distributed the tortillas to team members and cheerleaders because tortilla throwing was a tradition at UC Santa Barbara where he and Laaperi attended at the same time. The UCSB Alumni Association has said tortilla throwing has had to be banned because of game interruptions and "associations with racist ideology." This followed an effort in 2020 to ensure that the school districts curriculum not be updated to include a focus on racial justice. On July 6, the school board voted to "initiate litigation" thereby "enabling the Superintendent to enter the appeal process within the 15 day window," claiming their independent investigation "found no evidence warranting forfeiture of the title."

== Notable graduates ==
- Layne Beaubien – water polo player, 2004, 2008 & 2012 Olympics
- Lisa Bruce – film producer, The Theory of Everything (2014 film)
- Don Davis – Florida politician
- Ken Huff – former American football offensive lineman in the National Football League.
- Genai Kerr – water polo player, 2004 Olympics
- James Maslow - actor, dancer, model, singer
- Celina Mikolajczak – battery engineer and amateur astronomer
- Lou Niles – radio host of 91X and executive director of Oceanside International Film Festival
- Karlyn Pipes - decorated Masters-level swimmer and author
- Alan G. Poindexter – NASA astronaut
- Nick Reynolds – founding member of The Kingston Trio
- Jesse Smith – Olympic water polo player, 2004, 2008, 2012, 2016 & 2020
- David Young – radio producer, director and actor
