= H Steven Blum =

United States Army general

H. Steven Blum
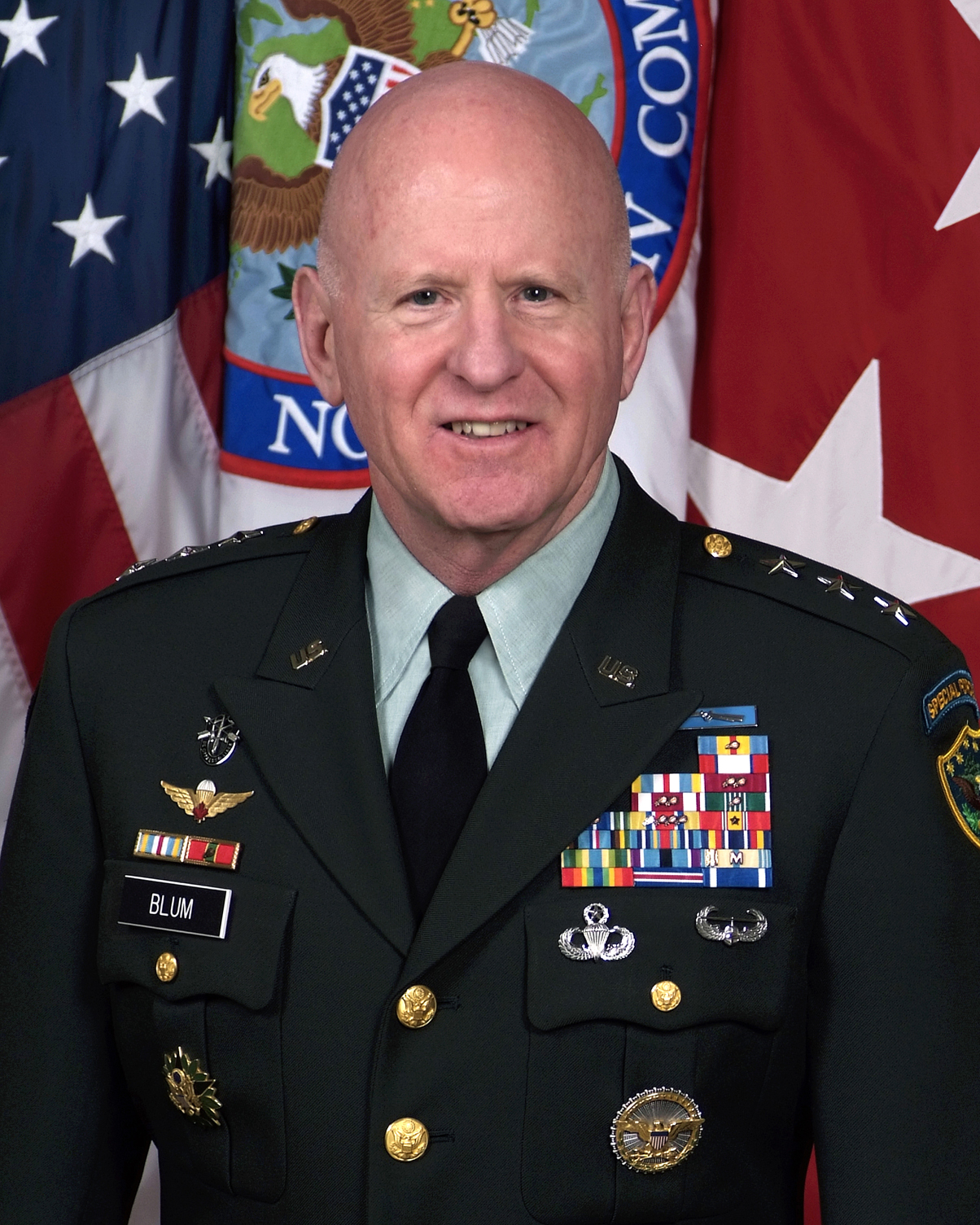
- Official portrait, 2009
- Born: October 13, 1946 (age 79); Baltimore, Maryland, U.S.
- Military career
- Allegiance: United States of America
- Branch: United States Army; Army National Guard
- Service years: Enlisted: 1968-1971 Officer: 1971-2010
- Rank: Lieutenant General
- Units: Infantry Branch; Army Special Forces • Maryland Army National Guard
- Commands: National Guard Bureau; Multinational Division (North); 29th Infantry Division; 3rd Brigade, 29th Infantry Division; 1st Battalion, 115th Infantry Regiment
- Conflicts: Baltimore riot of 1968; Operation Joint Forge; War on terror
- Awards: Defense Distinguished Service Medal (2); Army Distinguished Service Medal; Defense Superior Service Medal; Legion of Merit (3)
- Other work: Managing Director and Group Practice Leader, Sitrick Brincko Group; Advisor, Blakely Educational Services, Inc.

H. Steven Blum (born October 13, 1946) is a retired United States Army lieutenant general. He served as the 25th chief of the National Guard Bureau from 2003 to 2008. His last assignment before retiring was deputy commander, United States Northern Command, where he concurrently served as vice commander, United States Element, North American Aerospace Defense Command. He retired from the Army National Guard on May 21, 2010.

== Early life and education ==
Blum was born in Baltimore, Maryland, on October 13, 1946. He attended Forest Park High School, graduating in 1963. He obtained his Bachelor of Arts degree in history from the University of Baltimore in 1968.

Soon after graduating, Blum enlisted in the Maryland Army National Guard. His unit was activated in April 1968, in response to the Baltimore riot of 1968 that broke out following the assassination of Martin Luther King Jr. Blum would later recall that "he heard more shots fired in the weeks he worked downtown Baltimore's streets than during any of his other deployments – at home or abroad."

Blum taught United States history at Pimlico Junior High School before accepting a full-time position with the Army National Guard in 1971. He received a Master of Science degree in social science from Morgan State College in 1973.

Blum is Jewish, and is a member of Jewish War Veterans.

== Military career ==
Blum received his commission from Officer Candidate School on August 28, 1971, graduating with honors. He subsequently carried out staff and command assignments at every level from platoon to division, including command of a Special Forces Operational Detachment-A, Light Infantry Battalion, Infantry Brigade, and Division Support Command.

Blum's general officer assignments included Assistant Adjutant General for the Maryland Army National Guard, assistant division commander (support) and commander of the 29th Infantry Division (Light), and chief of staff, United States Northern Command.

=== Operation Joint Forge ===
Blum served as commanding general for Multinational Division (North) Stabilization Force 10 in Bosnia and Herzegovina during 2001 and 2002 as part of Operation Joint Forge.

During his tenure at SFOR, Blum received high marks for his military and diplomatic ability to command and coordinate multiple units of various nations. In his last work, To America: Personal Reflections of an Historian, the late historian Stephen Ambrose compared Blum favorably to Dwight Eisenhower in World War II.

=== Chief of the National Guard Bureau ===
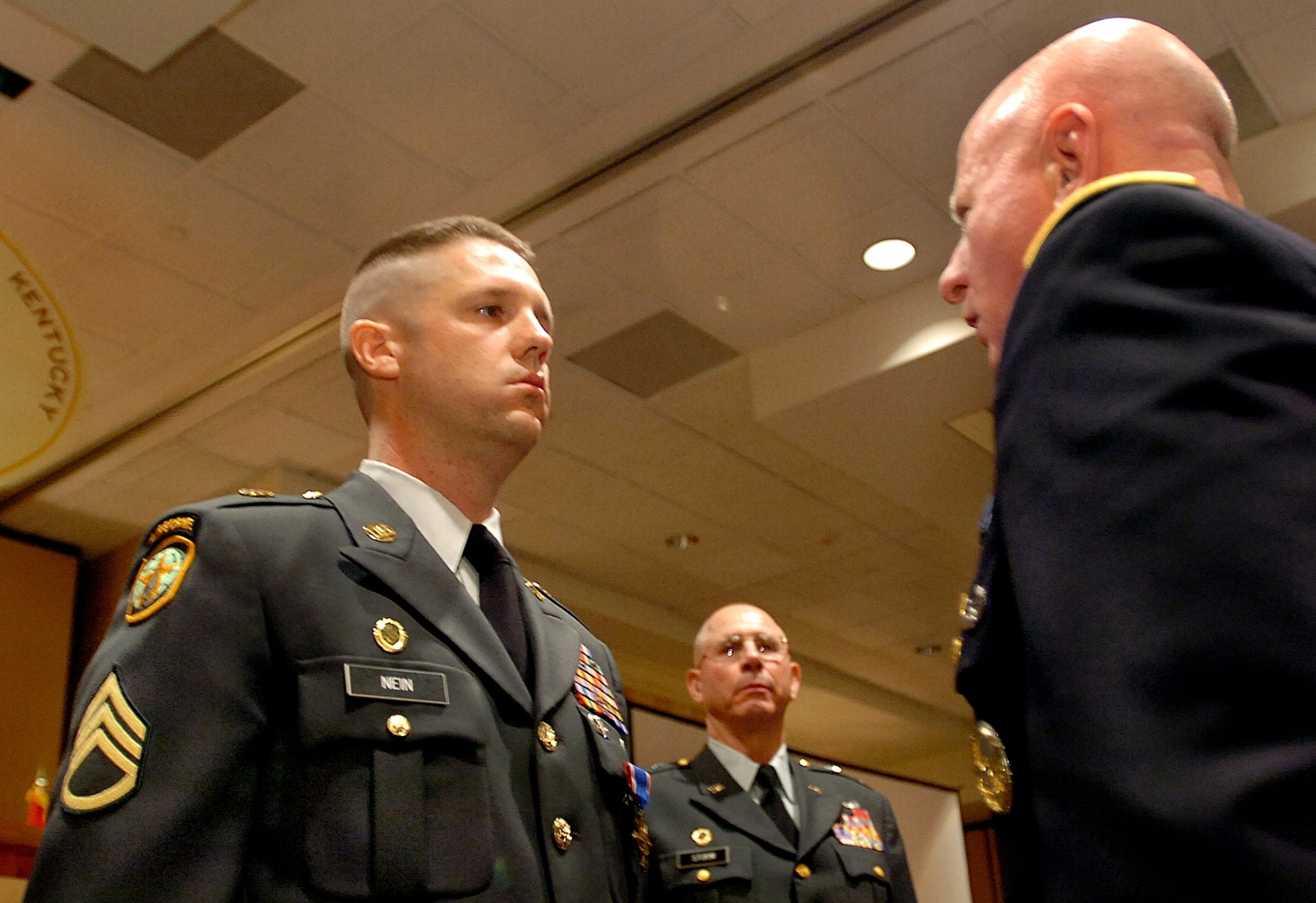
Blum awarding a soldier the Distinguished Service Cross in 2007

In April 2003 Blum was appointed chief of the National Guard Bureau and promoted to lieutenant general.

When his term expired in 2007 he received a two-year extension.

As chief of the National Guard Bureau, Blum was the senior uniformed National Guard officer, responsible for formulating, developing, and coordinating all policies, programs, and plans affecting more than half a million federalized and nonfederalized Army National Guard and Air National Guard personnel. Appointed by the U.S. president, he served as the principal adviser to the Secretary of Defense and Chief of Staff of the Army, and Chief of Staff of the Air Force on all National Guard issues. His duties also included serving as the Army's and Air Force's official channel of communication with state governors and adjutants general concerning the 54 state and territorial National Guards.

Blum served as chief until November 2008 and was succeeded by Craig R. McKinley.

=== United States Northern Command ===
Following his term as chief of the National Guard Bureau, Blum was assigned as Deputy Commander of the United States Northern Command.

As deputy commander, United States Northern Command, Blum helped lead the command to anticipate, prepare, and respond to threats and aggression aimed at the United States, its territories, and interests within the assigned area of responsibility and, as directed by the president or Secretary of Defense, provided defense support to civil authorities including consequence management operations.

He served at NORTHCOM until retiring in May 2010.

== Later work ==
After his retirement from the military, Blum accepted a position as managing director and group practice leader with the Sitrick Brincko Group.

He was also an Executive in Residence at Johns Hopkins University, School of Education, Division of Public Safety and Leadership.

As of 2012, Blum is affiliated with Blakely Educational Services, Inc., a firm which provides educational services to the United States military, its allies, and for other organizations.

== NAACP Meritorious Service Award ==
On July 18, 2006, Blum was awarded the NAACP Meritorious Service Award at their 31st annual Armed Services and Veterans Affairs Awards banquet. Some atheists and agnostics objected to certain remarks about their lack of religious belief, and his paraphrased repetition of the "no atheists in foxholes" assertion. According to Blum in his remarks: "The strength of this nation is that it's not homogeneous. We don't all look alike. We don't all think alike. We don't all play alike. We don't all have the same physical attributes."

== Civilian education ==
- 1968 Bachelor of Arts degree in history, University of Baltimore, Baltimore, Maryland
- 1973 Master of Science in social science, Morgan State College, Baltimore, Maryland

== Military education ==
- United States Army War College (1989)
- United States Army Command and General Staff College (1978)

In addition, Blum is a graduate of:

- United States Army Airborne School (1969)
- Special Forces Operations Course (1971)
- Infantry Officer Basic Course (1972)
- Special Forces Jumpmaster Course (1973)
- First U.S. Army Counter-Sniper Course (1974)
- Infantry Officer Advanced Course (1975)
- Nuclear, Biological and Chemical Officer/Enlisted Course (1979)
- National Defense University, National Security Management Course (1981)
- Air Assault School (1986)
- Project Management Course (1989)
- National Guard Bureau Executive Environmental Leadership Seminar (1990)
- Defense Equal Opportunity Management Institute, Equal Opportunity Leadership Training (1991)
- National Guard Total Quality Leadership and Management Seminar on Facilitation and Team Leadership (1991)
- McManis Associates Seminar on Implementing Total Quality Leadership and Management (1991)

== Assignments ==
1. August 1971 – September 1972, S-3, Detachment B3, Company B, 19th Special Forces Group (Airborne), 1st Special Forces, Maryland Army National Guard
2. October 1972 – August 1974, air operations officer, Headquarters Detachment, 5th Special Forces Battalion, 20th Special Forces Group, Maryland Army National Guard
3. August 1974 – August 1976, Battalion S-2, Headquarters Detachment, 5th Special Forces Battalion, 20th Special Forces, Maryland Army National Guard
4. September 1976 – November 1977, Recruiting and Retention Officer, Headquarters Detachment, Maryland Army National Guard
5. November 1977 – August 1978, commander, Special Forces Operations Detachment-A, Company B, 5th Special Forces Battalion, 20th Special Forces, Maryland Army National Guard
6. September 1978 – October 1978, Recruiting and Retention Officer, Headquarters Detachment, Maryland Army National Guard
7. October 1978 – June 1981, Special Forces Operations Officer, Command and Control, Headquarters, Maryland Army National Guard
8. July 1981 – September 1981, Marksmanship Program Administrator, Headquarters Detachment, Maryland Army National Guard
9. October 1981 – September 1982, Training Administrator, Headquarters Detachment, Maryland Army National Guard
10. October 1982 – November 1984, Director Plans, Operations and Training, Headquarters, State Area Command, Maryland Army National Guard
11. December 1984 – July 1985, Mobilization Operations Officer, Headquarters, State Area Command, Maryland Army National Guard
12. August 1985 – September 1987, battalion commander, Headquarters, 1st Battalion, 115th Infantry, 29th Infantry Division (Light), Maryland Army National Guard
13. October 1987 – October 1988, executive officer, Headquarters, 3rd Brigade, 29th Infantry Division (Light), Maryland Army National Guard
14. November 1988 – January 1989, Operations and training officer, Headquarters, State Area Command, Maryland Army National Guard
15. January 1989 – August 1992, director, Plans, Operations, and Training, Headquarters, Maryland Army National Guard
16. September 1992 – July 1995, commander, 3rd Brigade, 29th Infantry Division (Light), Maryland Army National Guard
17. July 1995 – August 1996, commander, Division Support Command, 29th Infantry Division (Light), Maryland Army National Guard
18. August 1996 – July 1999, assistant division commander, 29th Infantry Division (Light), Maryland Army National Guard
19. August 1999 – October 2001, commanding general, 29th Infantry Division (Light), Virginia Army National Guard
20. October 2001 – April 2002, commanding general, Multi National Division (North), Stabilization Force 10, Operation Joint Force, Bosnia and Herzegovina
21. April 2002 – August 2002, commanding general, 29th Infantry Division (Light), Virginia Army National Guard
22. August 2002 – April 2003, chief of staff, United States Northern Command, Peterson Air Force Base, Colorado
23. April 2003 – November 2008, chief, National Guard Bureau, Arlington, Virginia
24. January 2009 – May 21, 2010, deputy commander, United States Northern Command and vice commander, United States Element, North American Aerospace Defense Command, Peterson Air Force Base, Colorado

== Awards and decorations ==
Expert Infantryman Badge
Special Forces Tab
Master Parachutist Badge
Air Assault Badge
Secretary of Defense Identification Badge
Army Staff Identification Badge
1st Special Forces Command (Airborne) Distinctive Unit Insignia
Canadian Parachutist Badge
1 Overseas Service Bar

Defense Distinguished Service Medal (with 1 Bronze Oak Leaf Cluster)
Army Distinguished Service Medal
Defense Superior Service Medal
Legion of Merit (with 2 Bronze Oak Leaf Clusters)
Meritorious Service Medal (with 2 Bronze Oak Leaf Clusters)
Army Commendation Medal (with 1 Bronze Oak Leaf Cluster)
Army Achievement Medal (with 1 Bronze Oak Leaf Cluster)
Joint Meritorious Unit Award
Army Superior Unit Award (with 1 Bronze Oak Leaf Cluster)
Army Reserve Component Achievement Medal (with 1 Silver and 3 Bronze Oak Leaf Clusters)
National Defense Service Medal (with 2 Bronze Service Stars)
Armed Forces Expeditionary Medal
Global War on Terrorism Expeditionary Medal
Global War on Terrorism Service Medal
Armed Forces Service Medal
Humanitarian Service Medal
Armed Forces Reserve Medal (with "M" Device and Gold Hourglass)
Army Service Ribbon
Army Reserve Component Overseas Training Ribbon
NATO Medal

== Dates of rank ==
Rank	Date
Lieutenant general	April 13, 2003
Major general	February 1, 2000
Brigadier general	August 1, 1996
Colonel	January 3, 1989
Lieutenant colonel	October 1, 1982
Major	September 8, 1978
Captain	September 3, 1974
First lieutenant	August 28, 1972
Second lieutenant	August 28, 1971

Military offices
Preceded by William G. Webster	Deputy Commander of the United States Northern Command; 2009–2010	Succeeded by Frank J. Grass
Preceded by Raymond F. Rees (acting)	Chief of the National Guard Bureau; 2003–2008	Succeeded by Craig R. McKinley
