= Jonah Shacknai =

American executive and businessman

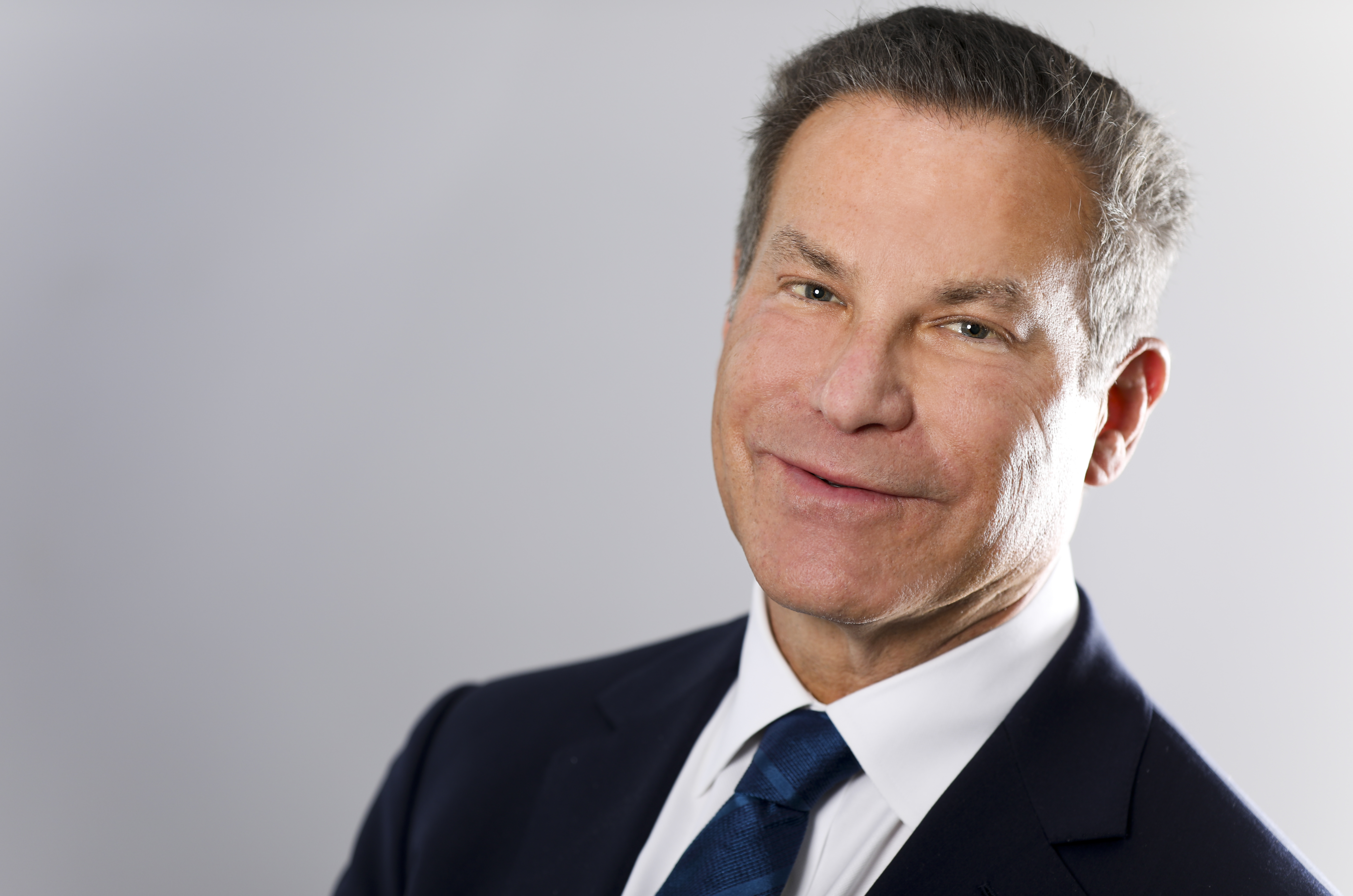
- Born: 1957 (age 68–69)
- Education: Colgate University; Georgetown University Law Center
- Occupation: Pharmaceutical executive
- Website: www.jonahshacknai.com

Jonah Shacknai (born 1957) is an American pharmaceutical executive. He was the founder of Illustris Pharmaceuticals and was the founder, chairman and CEO of Medicis Pharmaceutical Corporation. He also served as chief aide to the US House of Representatives' committee for health policy.

In 2011, one of his children, Max, was severely injured in what was ruled an accident. Max died in the hospital soon afterwards. Two days later, Jonah's girlfriend Rebecca Zahau was found dead at Shacknai's home. She was ruled to have committed suicide, although Shacknai's brother Adam was found responsible in a 2018 civil suit ruling that was later vacated.

== Career ==
Shacknai earned a BS from Colgate University and a JD from Georgetown University Law Center.

From 1977 until the end of 1982 Shacknai worked as the Chief Aide to the committee on health policy in the US House of Representatives. He also served on the Commission on the Federal Drug Approval Process and the National Council on Drugs.

Shacknai was a member of the National Arthritis and Musculoskeletal and Skin Diseases Advisory Council and on the US-Israel Science and Technology Commission.

He was a senior partner at the law firm Royer, Shacknai and Mehle from 1982 until 1988. The firm represented multinational pharmaceutical companies, medical device makers and four major industry trade associations.

Shacknai founded Medicis Pharmaceuticals in 1988. In 2012 he left his positions as CEO and chairman when Valeant Pharmaceuticals purchased Medicis for $2.6 billion.

== Personal life ==
Shacknai has been married three times, and is the father of five children. One of his children, Max, was injured in July 2011, two days before Shacknai's then-girlfriend Rebecca Zahau died. Max died in the hospital soon afterwards. San Diego Sheriff Bill Gore announced on September 2, 2011, that Zahau's death was a suicide while the younger Shacknai's death had been ruled an accident, and that neither was the result of foul play. Members of Zahau's family disputed this finding and filed a $10 million wrongful death lawsuit against Jonah Shacknai's brother Adam. The jury in that civil trial found Adam Shacknai responsible for Zahau's death and granted her family a $5 million judgment for loss of love and companionship as well as an additional $167,000 for the loss of financial support Zahau would have provided her mother and siblings. In February 2019, Adam Shacknai appealed the judgment with the defense arguing procedural errors and juror misconduct. Prior to final arguments being presented to the judge, Shacknai's insurance company and the Zahau family reached a settlement of $600,000 resulting in the civil case being dismissed with prejudice, and vacating the original $5 million judgment.

Shacknai hired public relations firm Sitrick and Company to represent him the week after Zahau's death. In response to media inquiries, a Sitrick and Company employee stated that he had hired the firm to handle his large volume of incoming calls in the days after the deaths, to give him time to grieve and make arrangements for the funerals.
