= Robert W. Farquhar =

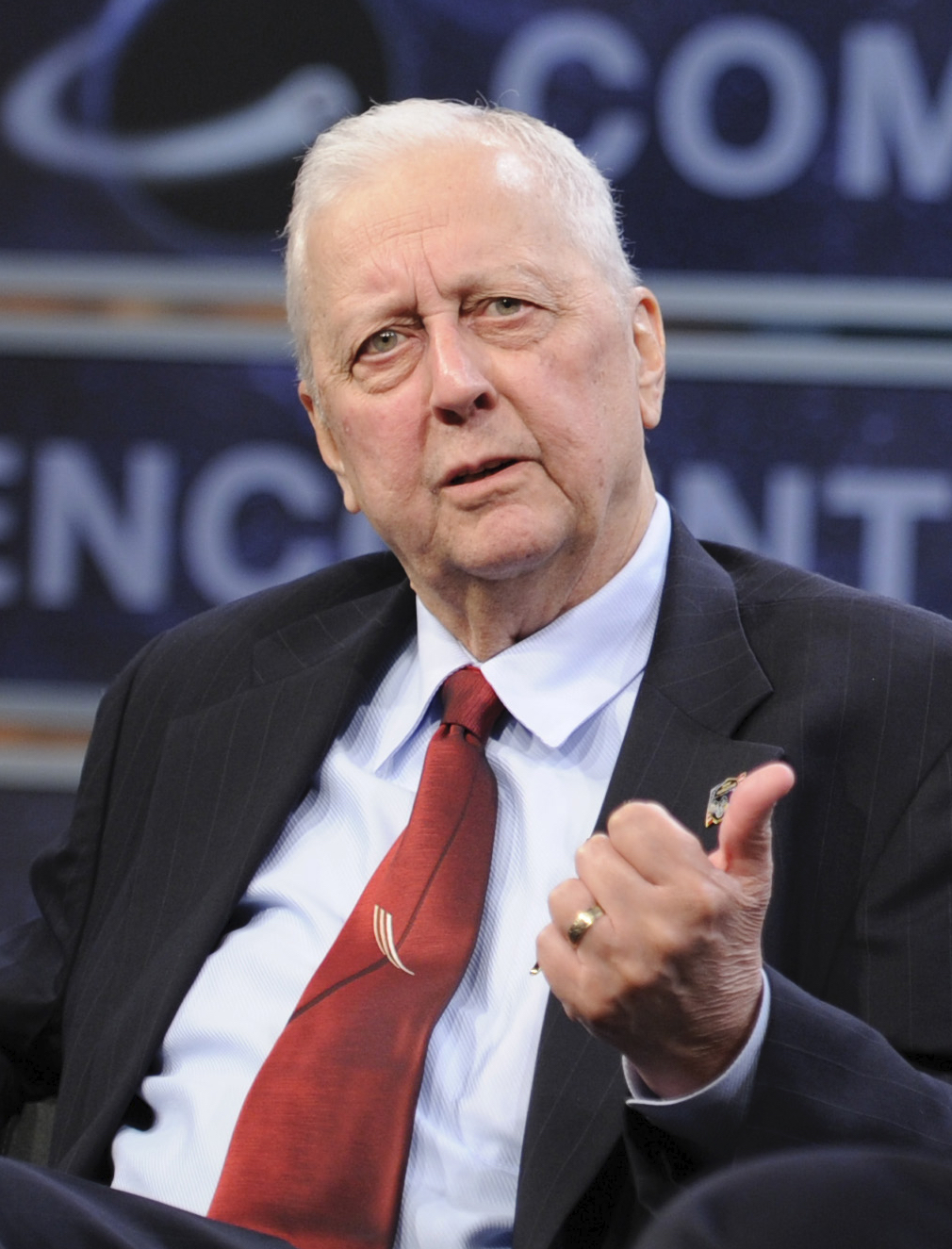
- Farquhar in 2010
- Born: Robert Greener; September 12, 1932; Chicago, Illinois
- Died: October 18, 2015 (aged 83); Burke, Virginia
- Education: University of Illinois, University of California
- Alma mater: Stanford University
- Scientific career
- Workplaces: NASA
- Thesis: The Control and Use of Libration-Point Satellites (1968)
- Doctoral advisor: John V. Breakwell

Robert Willard Farquhar (September 12, 1932 – October 18, 2015) was an American mission design specialist who worked for NASA. He designed halo orbits and was involved in a number of spaceflight missions.

Farquhar was elected as a member into the National Academy of Engineering in 2012 for deep space missions to asteroids and comets and for leading the NEAR mission to Eros.

== Early life and education ==
Robert Farquhar was born Robert Greener on September 12, 1932, in Chicago, Illinois. His father left when he was six weeks old and his mother remarried when he was thirteen years old, marrying Frank Farquhar. Frank formally adopted Robert when he was in high school, resulting in Robert taking his surname. He attended Yale Elementary School in Chicago before attending Parker High School. As a child Farquhar became interested in aviation, often reading about it and building model airplanes of his own design.

Farquhar attended Wilson Junior College briefly before joining the army in April 1951. He completed basic training at Fort Knox and jump training at Fort Benning before being deployed to Fort Bragg as part of the 82nd Airborne Division. In late 1952, Farquhar requested to be transferred to a division which was taking part in the Korean War, being deployed to the 187th Infantry Regiment stationed in Japan. After some training in Japan, Farquhar was invited to attend clerk typist school and became the company clerk, writing reports, for some time. One day, after some North Korean prisoners were released, Farquhar's division was moved to Kimpo airfield for one month. There, he was on the front lines until the ceasefire.

Returning to the U.S., Farquhar attended the University of Illinois Navy Pier campus before moving to the main campus at Champaign in 1957. There he decided on a career in spaceflight, finishing his bachelor's degree in aeronautical engineering in 1959. He stayed at the University of Illinois for graduate school before applying and being accepted for a position at the University of California, Los Angeles. During his summer after graduating, Farquhar worked at the RAND Corporation. He completed his engineering master's degree at the University of California. Farquhar attended Stanford University for his PhD in astronautics which he obtained in 1968.

== Career ==
Farquhar worked for NASA for a total of 23 years. His doctoral dissertation on libration points formed the groundwork of the International Sun-Earth Explorer-3 satellite's orbit, and he later developed a trajectory that would allow it to intercept the Giacobini–Zinner comet in 1985, a feat that resulted in a congratulatory letter from President Ronald Reagan. In 2014, Farquhar worked with a team that attempted to reposition the satellite into its previous orbit to continue scientific measurements.

Whilst working at the Johns Hopkins University's Applied Physics Laboratory, Farquhar was the flight director for the Near Earth Asteroid Rendezvous (NEAR) mission to 433 Eros – the first launch of the Discovery program of NASA. He developed the trajectory of the CONTOUR space probe, though the probe failed shortly after launch.

Farquhar is also credited with being the first to develop use of halo orbits around libration points, where the gravitational pull from two celestial bodies is balanced. The ISEE-3 mission was the first that exploited this development. Renamed the International Cometary Explorer (ICE), the spacecraft made a textbook pass through the tail of comet Giacobini-Zinner on September 11, 1985. He was also New Horizons' first encounter mission manager.

Farquhar died on October 18, 2015, following complications of a respiratory illness at his home in Burke, Virginia. He was 83. The Eunomia asteroid 5256 Farquhar was named in his honor.

== Family ==
Minor planet 5947 Bonnie was named after his first wife, Bonnie Gail Farquhar (1936–1993).

Minor planet 5957 Irina was named after his wife Irina Victorovna Farquhar.
