= Resources Global Professionals =

American management consultancy firm

RGP
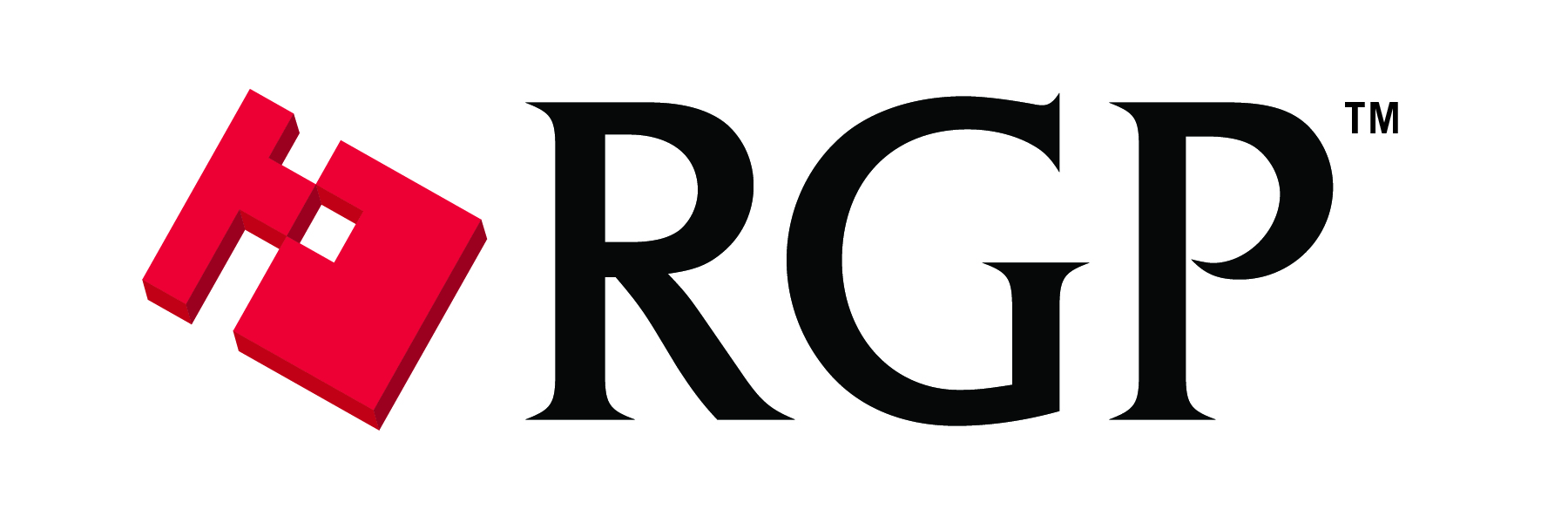
- Type: Public
- Traded as: Nasdaq: RGP
- Founded: Irvine, California (1996)
- Headquarters: Dallas, Texas
- Key people: Donald B. Murray, Founder and Chairman; Kate Duchene, Chief Executive Officer & President
- Services: Finance, Accounting, Cybersecurity & Data Privacy, Information Management, Corporate Advisory, Strategic Communications, Restructuring, Governance, Risk Management, and Compliance (GRC), Supply Chain Management, Human Capital and Legal & Regulatory Consulting Services
- Parent: Resources Connection, Inc.
- Website: RGP.com

RGP, formerly known as Resources Global Professionals, is the operating arm of Resources Connection, Inc. (NASDAQ:RGP). The company provides consulting services in the areas of finance & accounting, information management, governance, risk & compliance (GRC), human capital, legal & regulatory, corporate advisory & restructuring, strategic communications, and supply chain management. As of fiscal year ending May 28, 2016, the company employed 3,283 professionals in 68 offices in 20 countries around the world. The company reported serving over 1,700 clients. Company headquarters are located in Irvine, CA.

== History ==
Resources Connection, Inc. was founded in June 1996 by a team at Deloitte, led by Donald B. Murray, who was then a senior partner with Deloitte. The company operated as a part of Deloitte from June 1996 until April 1999 when a management-led buyout was completed in partnership with several investors. In December 2000, the company completed an initial public offering of common stock and began trading on the NASDAQ Stock Market. Hoover's recognized the IPO as one of the ten best performing of that quarter. The company now trades as one of the members of the NASDAQ Global Select index.

In January 2005, the company changed its operating entity name to Resources Global Professionals to better reflect the company's multinational capabilities. The company operated solely in the United States until 2000, when it opened its first three international offices and began to expand geographically.

In December 2012, the company shortened Resources Global Professionals to RGP, and announced new sub-brands RGP Healthcare and RGP Legal.

In June 2013, Donald B. Murray relinquished his position as the company's Chief Executive Officer, and Anthony Cherbak succeeded him as the company's new chief executive officer. Murray remained in his role as Executive Chairman.

In July 2015, the company announced Donald B. Murray will retire from his role as Executive Chairman at the end of August 2015, and remain chairman of the board.

In December 2016, the company announced the promotion of Kate Duchene to president and chief executive officer, effective December 19, 2016. Ms. Duchene had served as the company's Interim CEO since October 5, 2016, when Anthony Cherbak announced his unexpected retirement as CEO due to health considerations.
