= NGC 3646 =

Galaxy

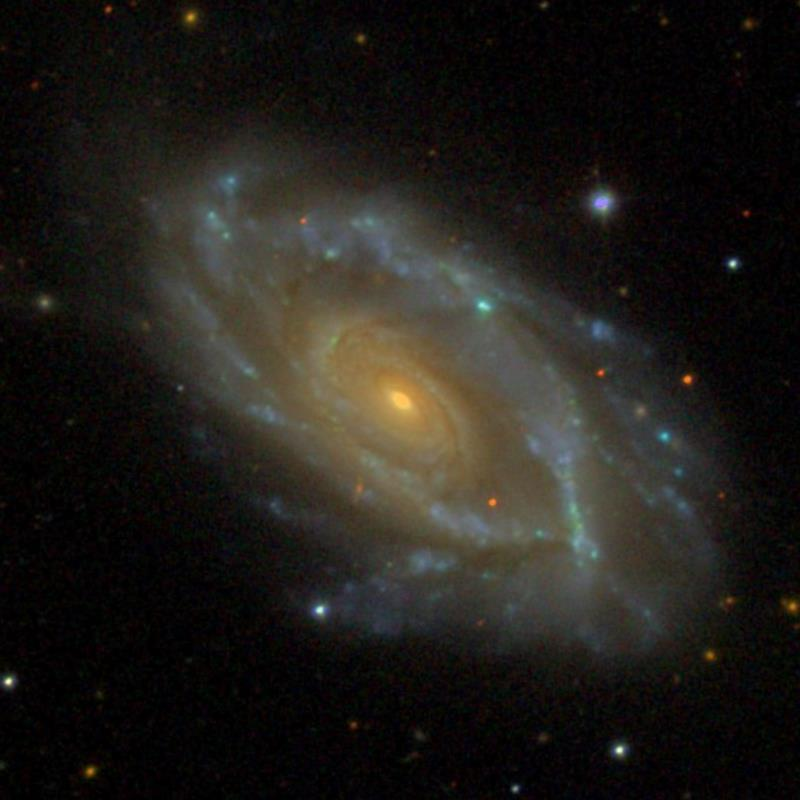
- NGC 3646 imaged by the Sloan Digital Sky Survey

Observation data (J2000 epoch)
- Constellation: Leo
- Right ascension: 11^{h} 21^{m} 43.0648^{s}
- Declination: +20° 10′ 10.505″
- Redshift: 0.01416 ± 0.00001
- Heliocentric radial velocity: 4,246±2 km/s
- Distance: 220.1 ± 15.5 Mly (67.49 ± 4.74 Mpc)
- Apparent magnitude (V): 11.13
- Apparent magnitude (B): 11.78

Characteristics
- Type: SA:(r)bc pec (ring)
- Size: ~210,300 ly (64.48 kpc) (estimated)

Other designations
- UGC 6376, MCG +03-29-037, PGC 34836, CGCG 096-034

NGC 3646 is a galaxy in the constellation Leo that has variously been described as "a strange spiral galaxy" of morphological classification Sc or SAa, or as "a ring-shaped galaxy". It was discovered by German-British astronomer William Herschel on 15 February 1784.

NGC 3646 has a structure consisting of three parts: an inner hub, a rapidly rotating spiral, and an irregular outer ring surrounding the spiral with an angular feature at one point of the ring. Although estimates vary for its distance, the NASA/IPAC Extragalactic Database lists its distance as 67.49 ± 4.74 megaparsecs (220.1 ± 15.5 Mly).

Burbidge et al. estimated that their measurements of motion in the outer ring were not consistent with stable circular orbits. Afanas'ev et al. argue that this conclusion was erroneous, based on incorrect measurements. Instead, they find a galaxy rotation curve that "places the galaxy among the most rapidly rotating and massive systems", "one of the largest and most luminous spirals in the local universe".

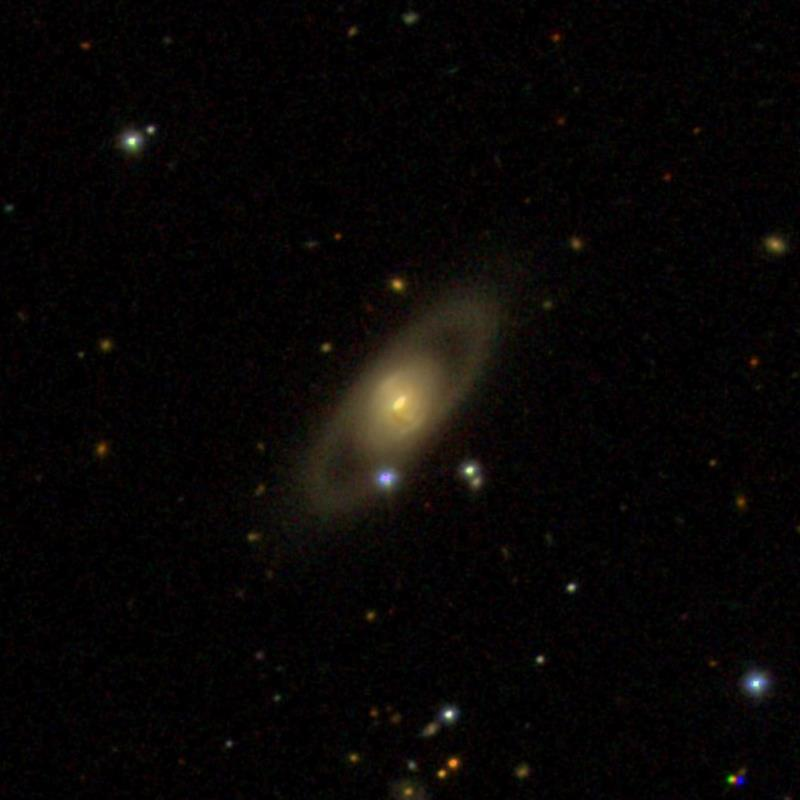
NGC 3649 from the Sloan Digital Sky Survey

NGC 3646 forms an isolated pair with a smaller companion galaxy, NGC 3649. The high rate of star formation in NGC 3646, the low rate in its companion, and the unusual shape of the outer ring in NGC 3646 may have resulted from interactions between these two galaxies.

== Supernovae ==
Four supernovae have been observed in NGC 3646:

- SN 1989N (Type II, mag. 14.5) was discovered by Celina Mikolajczak et al. on 30 June 1989.
- SN 1999 cd (Type II, mag. 17.9) was discovered by the Lick Observatory Supernova Search (LOSS) on 14 May 1999.
- SN 2020abqw (Type II, mag. 19.2155) was discovered by the Automatic Learning for the Rapid Classification of Events (ALeRCE) on 5 December 2020.
- SN 2021abqs (Type II, mag. 19.7848) was discovered by the ALeRCE on 17 October 2021.
