= Medicis Pharmaceutical =

Medical cosmetics company

- Company type: Subsidiary
- Industry: Pharmaceuticals
- Founded: 1988
- Founder: Jonah Shacknai
- Headquarters: Bridgewater, New Jersey
- Key people: Ryan H. Weldon (President)
- Parent: Valeant Pharmaceuticals
- Website: medicis.com

Medicis Pharmaceutical is a medical cosmetics company based in Bridgewater, New Jersey. It is a subsidiary of Valeant Pharmaceuticals, which acquired the company in 2012. Medicis is known for products such as Solodyn and Ziana for treating acne, and for Restylane and Dysport for treating facial wrinkles.

== History ==
Medicis was founded in Scottsdale, Arizona in 1988 by Jonah Shacknai and John Holaday. The company held its IPO in 1990 and launched its first products over the following year.

=== 1997 Acquisition of GenDerm ===
In December 1997, Medicis acquired dermatology pharmaceuticals company GenDerm Corporation for $60M in cash. It also acquired Ucyclyd Pharma, a Baltimore-based private company, for $23.4 million in April 1999. Ucyclyd's main product was Buphenyl (sodium phenylbutyrate), used for treating urea cycle disorders. In 2005, they rejected a $2.2 billion unsolicited takeover bid by Mentor.

=== 2011 Sale of LipoSonix to Solta Medical ===
In September 2011, the company sold its rights to the LipoSonix system to Solta Medical for $35 million. LipoSonix is an ultrasound device intended to help destroy fat deposits in the vicinity of the stomach referred to as "belly fat". For the year, Medicis recorded $721 million in revenue with a gross profit margin of roughly 90 percent.

=== 2011-2018 Media Attention ===
The company's founder, Jonah Shacknai, came to media attention in 2011 due to investigations into the deaths of his son Max and girlfriend Rebecca Zahau. A jury in a 2018 civil trial concluded that the death of Zahau a homicide by Jonah's brother, Adam Shacknai.

=== 2012 buyout by Valeant ===
In September 2012, Canadian-based Valeant Pharmaceuticals and Medicis' management agreed that Valeant would acquire the company for $2.6 billion, or $44/share, 39 percent more than the stock’s Aug. 31 closing price. The deal was subject to shareholder and regulatory approvals. It was the 11th acquisition for Valeant that year and was expected to close the next summer. The transaction was completed in December 2012, with Medicis delisting and becoming a subsidiary of Valeant, after which its board of directors disbanded. Later in December, Valeant dismissed 319 of Medicis' employees and retained 117. Shaknai left the company at the time of the acquisition and Medicis’ executive vice president and COO Ryan Weldon became company group chairman.

=== 2015 Arizona Consumer Fraud Lawsuit and Judicial Precedent ===
In 2015 Medicis was charged under the Arizona Consumer Fraud Act, and Arizona allowed consumer fraud law to apply against pharmaceutical companies for the first time. Medicis marketed an extended release form of minocycline, known to cause a lupus-like autoimmune response.
