= Juror misconduct =

Misconduct by a juror in a legal case

Juror misconduct is when the law of the court is violated by a member of the jury while a court case is in progression or after it has reached a verdict.

Misconduct can take several forms:

- Communication by the jury with those outside of the trial/court case. Those on the outside include “witnesses, attorneys, bailiffs, or judges about the case”.
- When the jury member brings outside evidence that they may have found themselves into the trial which has not been allowed by the judges or lawyers and is used to create bias on the part of the juror. This new information may be used to influence their final decision.
- “Conducting experiments regarding theories of the case outside the court’s presence”.

== Bias ==
An example is that of a juror in Manchester (USA) who tweeted openly throughout a rape trial to her friends, asking them whether they thought the man being tried was guilty of the rape or not. Another example was the case of Wardlaw v. State where a juror, contrary to instructions from the judge not to use the internet, looked up a definition of the illness from which the individual on trial was allegedly suffering. The juror did learn that lying was in fact a "symptom"; however, she chose to gather this information during the discussion to find a verdict.

== Social media ==
The Internet has frequently been used by jury members to gain access to additional information about a certain mental illness, or a broader definition or they are outsourcing trial information. The legal system and both the Charter of Rights and Freedoms and both the 5th amendment and 6th amendment in the United States are built around the fact that everyone is required to have a fair trial free from bias. There have been multiple instances where certain cases required retrials because of bias on the part of one or more of the jury members. The Internet, while it is the primary source to find additional information and details about another individual, does not necessarily mean that the information it provides is correct or accurate. According to Bell’s article, Juror Misconduct and the Internet, the use of the Internet within trials is not a new occurrence. It has been found in many cases, jurors who have searched for words unfamiliar to them, done extensive research, "engaged in at-home experiments, visited accident scenes, and otherwise obtained specialized knowledge".

== Forms of Internet information ==
=== Traditional sources ===
These sources seem to revolve around cases which include members of the jury searching for additional information about a certain term or illness that is significant in the case at hand. Usually the main outlets are encyclopedic definitions or Wikipedia. The use of the Internet has also given jurors the ability to easily and readily access information that they may want to find out about. As stated in Bell's article, many jurors do not have the time during breaks to go out to a library and locate hard copy sources of information needed, thus making the Internet the primary source because all it requires is the simple push of a button.

=== Novel sources ===
This type of information includes access to different sources of information such as:

(1) "information about parties and witnesses" referring to information about a defendant’s past, background information on a specific employer or business, both publicized information and private information such as driving records, and tickets. All this information is easily accessible over the Internet and all this information was shared among jury members in specific cases. The main outlets usually include Twitter, Facebook, and online encyclopedias and dictionaries. This would overthrow the entire trial thus causing an automatic mistrial.

(2) "Scientific and Technical Information". This source of information refers to using the Internet to perform their own form of investigation on the side without actually having to go to the physical scene of the crime. This form of personal investigation may use Google Earth to acquire specific locations and specific fine points about a crime scene such as neighbourhoods, distances between certain homes and areas, etc.

Since the Internet is frequently used to taint certain verdicts, many judges have put bans and limitations on jury members and their use of the Internet. When certain individuals are called to be on jury duty, they are told they are not allowed to communicate with other people who are not involved with the case, and they are told they are not allowed to use the Internet to research anything or to send out or receive any information that would compromise the integrity and fairness of the case at hand. This is definitely a challenge as the Internet is ever present in our society today. Another major problem, aside from the fact that a large majority of people have access to the Internet, is that the information individuals find may not be the entire truth, or may not be 100% accurate. When outside information is brought into a trial, it causes difficulties in ensuring no bias and a fair trial. Having outside information that is also inaccurate adds more bias and more unfairness to a trial.

== Methods used to prevent bias ==
One method is jury sequestration, housing the jurors in a hotel under the control of court officers and limiting their access to communications and people other than court staff.

=== Questionnaire ===
This method is slightly more effective because not only does it minimize the number of jurors to stand during trial, therefore eliminating potential bias and use of outside sources, but it "would also systematically exclude younger jurors and those who otherwise have basic experience using computers and the Internet…". According to Bell’s article, the main reason behind why outside research is often conducted is the desire to satisfy one's curiosity.

If a jury member is discovered to have brought in outside information, and juror misconduct is clearly present, then the jury member in question may be fined by the judge. This seems to be a deterrent to try to prevent future juror misconduct mishaps. It has been found to not be a successful deterrent because it solely shrinks the pool of individuals who wish to participate. A plausible way to prevent this misconduct from taking place is ensuring that the jury members, before the trial, understand completely "what constitutes research, their curiosity, and their perceived "moral duty" to render verdicts based on complete information". Another successful deterrent is to show how using outside influence is negative, how the life of the individual on trial is in the hands of these chosen jury members (Bell, 94) and to take away their sources of internet, such as phones, before the actual trial commences.

== Mistrials and alternatives ==
Mistrials are the common response in cases where juror misconduct has occurred. Mistrials can be costly and thus will be avoided if possible. When mistrials are seen as a solution, they are compared to wasted assets “when it could have easily been avoided”. If the possibility presents itself, according to Eltis’s article, simply dismissing the misconduct as unacceptable would be less destructive than a mistrial. Dismissing this misconduct will be destructive since it would not cause the trial to be fair. Overall, it is felt that a mistrial is quite a harsh decision, especially since Internet use by a juror is considered “impossible to control”.

== Punishment ==
Under the common law, jurors could be charged with contempt of court if they were found to have carried out independent research into the case they were trying. Proving that a juror was guilty of a contempt required proof that he/she had acted contrary to a judicial order (e.g. to refrain from carrying out research online). This created uncertainty and possible inconsistency, as judicial directions to jurors could vary. The Law Commission of England & Wales felt it would be better to create a separate criminal offence, as this would make the law clearer for jurors. The Law Commission also felt that the creation of a new offence would give jurors suspected of misconduct greater due process protections, as contempt was tried according to summary court procedure, whereas the proposed offence would be an indictable offence, and therefore subject to the due process protections of a full jury trial.

The Criminal Justice and Courts Act 2015 brought these proposals into law. As Crosby explains:

The Act makes it an offence for jurors to ‘research the case during the trial period’, to ‘disclose [improper] information to another member of the jury during the trial period’, and to engage in ‘conduct from which it may reasonably be concluded that the [juror] intends to try the issue otherwise than on the basis of the evidence presented in the proceedings on the issue’. Those found guilty of one of the new offences will be liable to imprisonment for up to two years, and will be disqualified from further service for a decade. What distinguishes these new offences from the existing option of using contempt proceedings is the fact jurors would now be proceeded against on indictment: that they would be tried by their peers for alleged misconduct. This represents a significant change in juror management techniques, as it is probable that criminal trial jurors accused of misconduct have never been tried in this way.

Former jurors found guilty of one of the new offences will be disqualified from jury service for ten years, even if they have been fined rather than imprisoned. Such disqualifications had previously required: a sentence of imprisonment; a community order; a community rehabilitation order; a community punishment order; a community punishment and rehabilitation order; a drug treatment and testing order; or a drug abstinence order. The 2015 Act introduces for the first time the principle that a fine may also be sufficient for temporary juror disqualification.

== See also ==
- Miscarriage of justice
