= List of women historians by area of study =

This is a list of women historians categorized by their area of study.

== Ancient history ==
- Leonie Archer (born 1955) – Graeco-Roman Palestine
- Mary Beard (born 1955)
- Halet Çambel (1916, Berlin, Germany - 2014, İstanbul, Türkiye) — Archaeologist, Historian, Ancient Anatolian
- Yuliya Kolosovskaya (1920–2002) – Roman history and Roman provinces of the Danube
- Barbara Levick (born 1931) – Roman emperors
- Heleen Sancisi-Weerdenburg (1944–2000) – specializing in classical Greek and Achaemenid history
- Mariya Sergeyenko (1891–1987) – Roman agriculture and daily life
- Elena Shtaerman (1914–1991) – Roman history
- Lily Ross Taylor (1886–1969) – Roman history

== Medieval history ==
- Elisabeth van Houts (born 1952) – medieval European history
- Rosamond McKitterick (born 1949) – Frankish and Carolingian history
- Anneke B. Mulder-Bakker (born 1940) – specialist in the position of women during the Middle Ages
- Mayke de Jong (born 1950) – political and religious history of the early Middle Ages
- Eileen Power (1889–1940) – Middle Ages
- Miri Rubin (born 1956) – social and religious history, 1100–1500
- Catrien Santing (born 1958) – cultural history and medical history in the late-medieval and early-modern Low Countries
- Päivi Setälä (1943–2014) – women's history
- Retha Warnicke (born 1939)

== By nation or geographical area ==
=== North America ===
==== History of Canada ====
- Charlotte Gray (born 1948) – popular histories
- Agnes Laut (1871 – 1936)

See also List of Canadian historians.

==== History of the Caribbean ====
- Aviva Chomsky (born 1957)
- Lucille M. Mair (1924–2009)

==== History of the United States ====
- Holly Brewer (born 1964) – early American History
- Alexis Coe (born 1988) – Presidential history
- Drew Gilpin Faust (born 1947) – Civil War, culture of death, and the Confederacy
- Elizabeth Fox-Genovese (1941–2007) – Southern slavery, women's history
- Doris Kearns Goodwin (born 1943) – U.S. presidents, won a Pulitzer Prize in 1995 for No Ordinary Time: Franklin and Eleanor Roosevelt: The Home Front in World War II
- Pauline Maier (1938–2013) – late Colonial, Revolution, Constitution
- Irma Tam Soong (1912–2001) – history of Chinese immigration in Hawaii
- Betty Wood (1945–2021) – early American history

=== Latin America ===
==== History of Latin America ====
See also Category:Historians of Latin America

- Aviva Chomsky (born 1957)
- Ann Farnsworth-Alvear
- Jane Gilmer Landers (born 1947)

==== Brazil ====
- Lilia Moritz Schwarcz (born 1957)

==== Peru ====
- María Rostworowski (1915–2016)

=== Europe ===
==== History of Europe ====
- Patricia Clavin (born 1964) – international relations and transnational relations
- Elizabeth Eisenstein (1923–2016) – early printing and transitions in media
- Julia P. Gelardi – royal history of 19th and 20th centuries
- Elisabeth van Houts (born 1952) – medieval European history
- Aira Kemiläinen (1919–2006) – European history of ideas
- Laura Kolbe (born 1957)
- Effie Pedaliu – history of Italian war crimes and Cold War
- Charlotte Zeepvat – royal history of 19th and 20th centuries

==== History of Belgium ====
- Sophie de Schaepdrijver (born 1961) – World War I

==== History of England and Britain ====
- Leonie Archer (born 1955) – British
- Antoinette Burton (born 1961) – British Empire
- Karen Armstrong (born 1944) – religious
- Linda Colley (born 1949) – 18th century
- Susan Doran – Elizabethan
- Jennifer Kewley Draskau (died 2024) – Manx history, Tudor history
- Antonia Fraser (born 1932) – 17th century
- Ruth Goodman (born 1963) – early modern
- Mary Dormer Harris (1867–1936) – medievalist, local history of Coventry
- Ragnhild Hatton (1913–1995) – biographer of King Charles XII of Sweden and King George I of Great Britain
- Lotte Hellinga (born 1932) – book historian, expert in early printing, expert in the work of the fifteenth-century printer William Caxton.
- Gertrude Himmelfarb (1922–2019) – social and cultural history of the Victorian period
- Hilda Kean (born 1949) – public history and the history of human–animal relationships in Britain
- Chien-hui Li – 19th century British animal protection movements and animal history
- Suzannah Lipscomb (born 1978) – 16th century
- Harriet Ritvo – British cultural history, environmental history and the history of human–animal relationships
- Retha Warnicke (born 1939) – Tudor history and gender issues
- Cicely Veronica Wedgwood (1910–1997) – British
- G. M. Young (1882–1959) – Victorian England

==== History of the British Empire ====
- Antoinette Burton (born 1961)

==== History of Croatia ====
- Nada Klaić (1920–1988)
- Mirjana Gross (1922–2012)

==== History of Finland ====
- Marjatta Hietala (born 1943) – urban history, history of innovations
- Riitta Nikula (born 1944) – generalist historian of Finnish architecture
- Jully Ramsay (1865–1919) – first woman genealogist in Finland, pioneer of Finnish genealogy

==== History of France ====
- Natalie Zemon Davis (born 1928) – early modern France
- Gisèle Sapiro (born 1965) – 19th and 20th century French literature
- Alma Söderhjelm (1870–1949) – editing the correspondence of the French Queen Marie Antoinette with the Swedish nobleman von Fersen and with some French revolutionaries

See also List of historians of the French Revolution.

==== History of Germany ====
- Celia Applegate – music history and nationalism
- Gisela Bock (born 1942)
- Luise Gerbing (1855–1927), history of Thuringia
- Deborah Hertz (born 1949)
- Claudia Koonz (born 1940)
- Wendy Lower (born 1965) – history of National Socialism

==== History of Ireland ====
- Mary Bonaventure Browne (after 1610–after 1670) – Poor Clare and historian
- Ann Buckley
- Kathleen Hughes (1926–1977)

==== History of Italy ====
- Alessandra Kersevan (born 1950) – Italian concentration camps
- Effie Pedaliu – Italian war crimes
- Lucy Riall (born 1962) – The Risorgimento, Garibaldi, Sicily

==== History of Moldova/Bessarabia ====
- Rebecca Haynes

==== History of the Netherlands ====
- Henrica van Erp (1480–1548) – monastery life

==== History of Romania ====
- Irina Livezeanu (born 1952)

==== History of Russia ====
- Patricia Kennedy Grimsted (born 1935) – post-Soviet archives
- Lindsey Hughes (1949–2007) – C17th and C18th
- Anne Applebaum (born 1964) – Gulag history
- Sheila Fitzpatrick (born 1941) – everyday life under Stalinism

==== History of Scotland ====
- Rosalind Mitchison (1919–2002)
- Jenny Wormald (1942–2015)

==== History of Slovakia ====
- Gabriela Dudeková (born 1968) – social policy of Austria-Hungary; situation of POWs and civilians in World War I; history of feminism and gender studies
- Zora Mintalová – Zubercová (born 1950) – food history and material culture of Central Europe

==== History of Slovenia ====
- Alessandra Kersevan (born 1950) – Italian concentration camps
- Marta Verginella (born 1960) – history of the Slovene minority in Italy (1920–1947)

==== History of Spain ====
- Ida Altman (born 1950) – Early modern Spain, colonial Latin America
- Julia Pavón (born 1968) – medieval history of Navarra

==== History of Sweden ====
- Ragnhild Hatton (1913–1995) – biographer of King Charles XII of Sweden and King George I of Great Britain

==== History of Yugoslavia ====
- Barbara Jelavich (1923–1995) – wrote extensively on Balkan history, along with her husband Charles Jelavich
- Catherine Samary – author of Yugoslavia Dismembered
- Stephen Schwartz (born 1948)

=== Asia ===
==== Middle East ====
- Caroline Finkel
- Hamilton Alexander Rosskeen Gibb (1895–1971) – Editor, The Encyclopaedia of Islam
- Heleen Sancisi-Weerdenburg (1944–2000) – Achaemenid history

==== Central Asia ====
- Lola Dodkhudoeva (born 1951), Tajikistani historian specialising in medieval Central Asian affairs
- Svetlana Gorshenina (born 1969), Uzbek specialist on Pre-Islamic Central Asia

==== South Asia ====
===== History of the Indian Subcontinent =====
- Ayesha Jalal (born 1956)
- Romila Thapar (born 1931)
- Barbara Metcalf (born 1941)
- Tanika Sarkar
- Isabel Giberne Sieveking (1857–1936) – Indian Mutiny
- Barbara Ramusack (born 1937)

==== Far East ====
===== History of Japan =====
- Gail Lee Bernstein (born 1939)
- Carol Gluck (born 1941)
- Susan Hanley (born 1939)
- Joyce Lebra (1925–2021)
- Amy Stanley (born 1978)

===== History of China =====
- Ann Paludan (1928–2014) – ancient China

==== History of Hong Kong ====
- Elizabeth Sinn Yuk Yee (born 1961)

=== Africa ===
- Jocelyne Dakhlia (born 1959) – political and cultural history of Islam in the Maghreb

==== History of the Serers ====
- Marguerite Dupire (1920–2015) – French scholar of Serer religion and history

== By general category ==
=== Architectural history ===
- Riitta Nikula (born 1944) – generalist historian of Finnish architecture

=== Art history ===
- Nurhan Atasoy (born 1934, Tokat, Türkiye) – Turkish and Islamic Art History
- Anna Kortelainen (born in 1968)
- Catherine Mason – British computer and digital art history
- Alena Potůčková (1953–2018) – Czech art history
- Orlando E. Toledo Morales (born in 1964)

=== Christianity ===
- Barbara Thiering (1930–2015) – rediscovered the "Pesher technique"

=== Economic history ===
- Leah Boustan
- Claudia Goldin (born 1946)
- Susan Howson (born 1945)
- Naomi Lamoreaux (born 1950)

=== Egyptology ===
- Penelope Wilson

=== Environmental history ===
- Nancy C. Unger – American women in the environmental movement

=== Food history ===
- Zora Mintalová – Zubercová (born 1950)

=== Gender history ===
- Francisca de Haan (fl. 1998-) – Central, Eastern and South Eastern European Women's and Gender History
- Johanna Naber (1859–1941) – influential women and the women's movement
- Marysa Navarro (born 1934) – feminism
- Kaari Utrio – women and children
- Retha Warnicke (born 1939) – gender issues

=== History of ideas, culture, literature, and philosophy ===
- Marjatta Hietala (born 1943) – urban history, history of innovations
- Aira Kemiläinen (1919–2006) – European history of ideas

=== History of international relations ===
- Ragnhild Hatton (1913–1995) – historian of 17th- and 18th-century international relations

=== History of science and technology ===
- Orit Halpern (born 1972) – historian of technology, cyberneticist
- Evelyn Fox Keller (born 1936) – science and gender, biology

=== Holocaust ===
- Ruth Bettina Birn (born 1952)
- Catherine Chatterley
- Danuta Czech (1922–2004)
- Lucy Dawidowicz (1915–1990)
- Deborah Dwork
- Leo Eitinger (1912–1996)
- Barbara Engelking (born 1962)
- Esther Farbstein (born 1946)
- Susanne Heim (born 1955)
- Deborah Lipstadt (born 1947)
- Dina Porat (born 1943)
- Livia Rothkirchen (1922–2013)
- Sybille Steinbacher (born 1966)
- Rebecca Wittmann (born 1970)
- Hanna Yablonka (born 1950)
- Leni Yahil (1912–2007)

=== Military history ===
- Beth Bailey
- Isabel Giberne Sieveking

=== Mormonism ===
- Fawn M. Brodie (1915–1981)

=== Naval history ===
- Ulane Bonnel (1918–2006)

=== Social history ===
- Gabriela Dudeková (born 1968)
- Ruth Goodman (born 1963) – early modern, British social history

== Biography ==
- Elizabeth Gaskell (1810–1865) – Charlotte Brontë
- Ragnhild Hatton (1913–1995) – biographer of King Charles XII of Sweden and King George I of Great Britain
- Susan Quinn (born 1940) – Marie Curie
