= Gonars concentration camp =

Concentration camp run by Italy during WWII

Coordinates: 45°54′25.4″N 13°14′13.63″E

Gonars
- Italian concentration camp
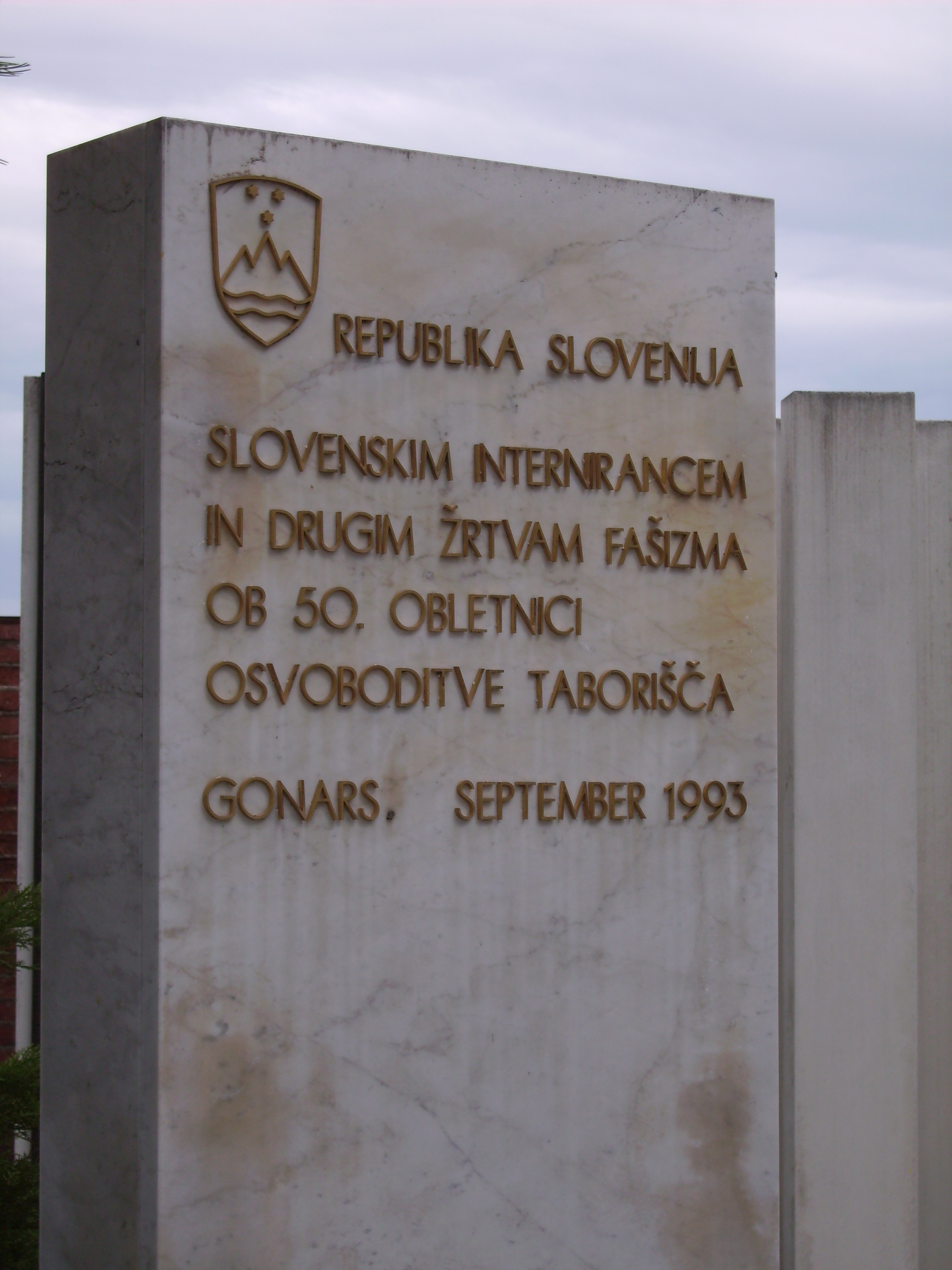
- Monument for Slovene victims
- Location: Gonars, Italy
- Operated by: Italian Ministry of the Interior
- Commandant: Lieutenant Colonel Eugenio Vicedomini, Cesare Marioni, Ignazio Fragapane, Gustavo De Dominicis, Arturo Macchi
- Operational: 23 February 1942 – 8 September 1943
- Inmates: Mostly ethnic Slovene and Croat civilians
- Number of inmates: 10,000 (1943)
- Killed: 500+

The Gonars concentration camp was one of the several Italian concentration camps and it was established on February 23, 1942, near Gonars, Italy.

Many prisoners were transferred to this camp from another Italian concentration camp, the Rab concentration camp, which served as equivalent of the final solution in Mario Roatta's ethnic cleansing policy against ethnic Slovenes from the Italian-annexed Province of Ljubljana and Croats from Gorski Kotar, in accord with the racist 1920s speech by Benito Mussolini, along with other Italian war crimes committed on the Italian-annexed territories of Yugoslavia:

When dealing with such a race as Slavic – inferior and barbarian – we must not pursue the carrot, but the stick policy.... We should not be afraid of new victims.... The Italian border should run across the Brenner Pass, Monte Nevoso and the Dinaric Alps.... I would say we can easily sacrifice 500,000 barbaric Slavs for 50,000 Italians....

— Benito Mussolini, speech held in Pula, 22 February 1922

The first transport of 5,343 prisoners (1,643 of whom were children) arrived two days after its establishment, on February 23, 1942, from the Province of Ljubljana and from two other Italian concentration camps, the Rab camp and the camp at Monigo (near Treviso).

The camp was disbanded on September 8, 1943, immediately after the Italian armistice.

Only in 1973 was a memorial created by the sculptor Miodrag Živković at the town's cemetery. The remains of 453 Slovenian and Croatian victims were transferred into its two underground crypts. It is believed that at least 50 additional persons died in the camp due to starvation and torture. At least 93 children were killed at the camp, including those that had been transferred from the Rab concentration camp to Gonars.

== Notable inmates ==
=== Slovenes ===
- Viktor Antolin, professor of philosophy (student/journalist at the time)
- France Balantič, poet
- France Bučar, lawyer, writer, and statesman in post-1991 Slovenia
- Lojze Bukovac, recipient of the Commemorative Medal of the Partisans of 1941, a writer
- Alojz Gradnik, poet
- Bogo Grafenauer, historian
- Zora Konjajev, pediatrician
- Boris Kraigher, politician
- Vasilij Melik, historian
- Frane Milčinski (pen name Ježek), a poet, actor, children's writer, and director
- Odon Peterka, poet
- Jakob Savinšek, sculptor and poet
- Bojan Štih, literary critic, essayist, and stage director
- Bogdana Stritar, opera singer
- Aleš Strojnik, engineer and educator
- Nada Vidmar, opera singer
- Nande Vidmar, painter
- Anton Vratuša, politician
- Vitomil Zupan, writer
- Tone Čufar, writer

== Sources ==
- Alessandra Kersevan (2008): Lager italiani. Pulizia etnica e campi di concentramento fascisti per civili jugoslavi 1941–1943. Editore Nutrimenti,
- Alessandra Kersevan (2003): Un campo di concentramento fascista. Gonars 1942–1943., Kappa Vu Edizioni, Udine.
- Nadja Pahor Verri (1996): Oltre il filo : storia del campo di internamento di Gonars, 1941–1943, Arti Grafiche Friulane, Udine.
- Luca Baldissara, Paolo Pezzino (2004): Crimini e memorie di guerra: violenze contro le popolazioni e politiche del ricordo, L'Ancora del Mediterraneo. ISBN 978-88-8325-135-1

== See also ==
- Rab concentration camp
- List of Italian concentration camps
