= Gonars =

Gonars Gonârs (Friulian)
- Comune
- Comune di Gonars
- Location within Italy Location within Friuli-Venezia Giulia
- Coordinates: 45°54′N 13°14′E
- Country: Italy
- Region: Friuli-Venezia Giulia
- Province: Udine (UD)
- Frazioni: Ontagnano, Fauglis, Bordiga, Mulini

Government
  - Mayor: Ivan Diego Boemo

Area
  - Total: 19.9 km^{2} (7.7 sq mi)
- Elevation: 21 m (69 ft)

Population (31 August 2017)
  - Total: 4,729
  - Density: 238/km^{2} (615/sq mi)
- Demonym: Gonaresi
- Time zone: UTC+1 (CET)
  - Summer (DST): UTC+2 (CEST)
- Postal code: 33050
- Dialing code: 0432
- Patron saint: Saint Canziano
- Saint day: May 30
- Website: Official website

Gonars (Friulian: Gonârs) is a town and comune (municipality) in the Regional decentralization entity of Udine in Friuli, Friuli-Venezia Giulia, northeastern Italy. It is located near Palmanova.

== History ==
=== World War II ===
On 23 February 1942, the Fascist regime established a concentration camp in the town, mostly for prisoners from what is now Slovenia and Croatia. The first transport of 5,343 internees (1,643 of whom were children) arrived two days later from the Province of Ljubljana and from the Rab camp and the camp at Monigo near Treviso.

The camp was disbanded on 8 September 1943, immediately after the Italian capitulation. Every effort was made to erase any evidence of it. The camp's buildings were destroyed, the materials were used to build a nearby preschool, and the site was turned into a meadow. Only in 1973 was a memorial created by the sculptor Miodrag Živković at the town's cemetery. The remains of 453 Slovenian and Croatian victims were transferred into its two underground crypts. It is believed that at least 50 additional persons died in the camp due to starvation and torture. Apart from the memorial, no other evidence of the camp remains and even many locals are unaware of it.

Among the people interned in the camp were the engineer Aleš Strojnik, writer Vitomil Zupan, poets Alojz Gradnik and France Balantič, historians Bogo Grafenauer and Vasilij Melik, sculptor Jakob Savinšek, playwright and essayist Bojan Štih, journalist Ernest Petrin, and politicians Anton Vratuša, Boris Kraigher, and France Bučar.

== Twin cities ==
- Vrhnika, Slovenia
