= Italian war crimes =

War crimes committed by Italy

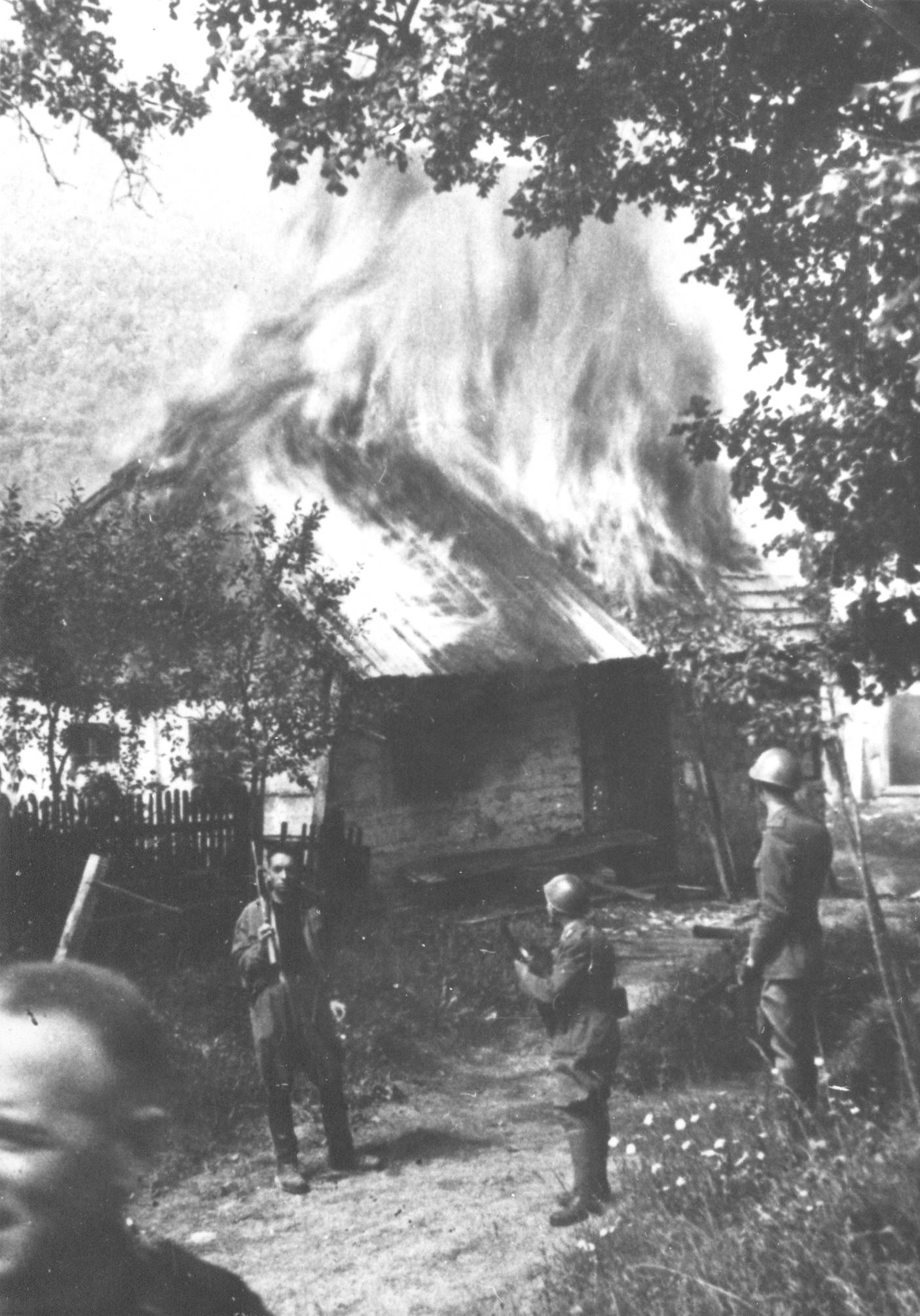
- Italian soldiers burning a village in Čabar in the Independent State of Croatia in 1941.
- Location: Europe and Africa, in particular: Yugoslavia; Ethiopia; Greece; Libya; Somalia; Albania
- Date: 1911–1945
- Target: Ethiopians, Croats, Slovenes, Libyans, Greeks, Albanians, Jews
- Attack type: Ethnic cleansing, starvation, internment, mass murder, reprisals, poison gas, genocidal massacres, rape
- Deaths: c. 500,000–900,000 (Note: 382,800 Ethiopians (Ethiopian government claim); 11,000 (direct deaths) to 300,000 (famine deaths) Greeks; 20,000 to 100,000 Libyans; 40,000+ Yugoslavs (Mainly Croats and Slovenes); 28,000 Albanians; 7,680 Jews (killed during the Holocaust); 4,000+ Spaniards)
- Perpetrators: Kingdom of Italy (1911–1943); Italian Social Republic (1943–1945)
- Motive: Italian irredentism; Italianisation; Racism; Colonialism; Italian nationalism; Fascism

Italian war crimes have mainly been associated with the Kingdom of Italy under Fascist rule during the Pacification of Libya, the Second Italo-Ethiopian War, the Spanish Civil War, and Second World War.

== Italo-Turkish War ==
In 1911, Italy went to war with the Ottoman Empire and invaded Ottoman Tripolitania. One of the most notorious incidents during this conflict was the October Tripoli massacre, wherein an estimated 4,000 inhabitants of the Mechiya oasis were killed as retribution for the execution and mutilation of Italian captives taken in an ambush at nearby Sciara Sciat. Over the course of three days, Libyan and Turkish men, women, and children were indiscriminately murdered in the streets, in their houses, farms, and gardens. Libyan and Turkish women were also reportedly raped and sexually assaulted by Italian troops, prompting ferocious and violent retaliation against captured Italian troops by Ottoman soldiers. In another incident during the war reported by a British officer serving with the Turkish forces, Italian soldiers burned several hundred civilians in a mosque, wherein women and children had taken refuge. In 1912, 10,000 Turkish and Arab troops were imprisoned in concentration camps in Libya, and all Turkish troops were executed.

== World War I ==
During the Italian occupation of Southwestern Anatolia following the Ottoman defeat and surrender in the First World War, a large number of reports and complaints reportedly emerged of Italian occupation troops committing rape against Turkish civilians in the cities and villages they occupied. On the other hand, some reports also suggest benevolence and fairness, with Italian forces sometimes even handing out chocolate and postcards to Turkish children, as well as providing refuge and shelter to displaced Turkish civilians. Others state that the behavior of the Italian troops in Turkey was mixed, and was generally “arbitrary”, and depended on the particular circumstances.

== Pacification of Libya ==
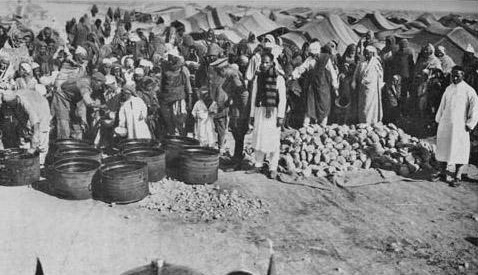
Libyan prisoners in the El Agheila concentration camp

In 1923, Benito Mussolini embarked upon a pacification of Libya campaign to consolidate control over the Italian territory of Libya and Italian forces began to occupy large areas of Libya in order to allow Italian colonists to rapidly settle in it. They were met with resistance by the Senussi who were led by Omar Mukhtar. Civilians suspected of collaboration with the Senussi were executed. Refugees from the fighting were subject to bombing and strafing by Italian aircraft. In 1930, in northern Cyrenaica, 20,000 Bedouins were relocated and their land was given to Italian settlers. The Bedouins were forced to march across the desert into concentration camps. Starvation and other poor conditions in the camps were rampant and the internees were used for forced labour, ultimately leading to the death of nearly 4,000 internees by the time they were closed in September 1933. Accounts of war crimes and atrocities committed by Rodolfo Graziani’s forces report that they threw prisoners from high altitude planes, ran them over with tanks while they were still alive, raped and disemboweled women, indiscriminately bombarded villages with mustard gas, and did not spare women or children. It is estimated that 20,000 to 100,000 Libyans were killed from the period of 1929–1934 in total, via death marches, chemical gas attacks, and brutal conditions in desert concentration camps. The United Nations estimated that during the entire Italian colonial period, from 1912 to 1942, 250,000–300,000 Libyan civilians lost their lives under Italian colonialism. Ali Abdullatif Ahmida suggests this figure is higher, at 500,000.

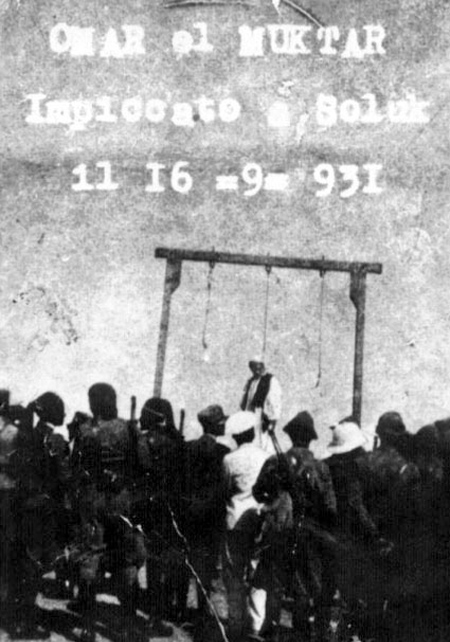
Execution of Omar Mukhtar (16 September 1931)

== Second Italo-Ethiopian War ==
During the Second Italo-Ethiopian War, Italian violations of the laws of war were reported and documented. These included the use of chemical weapons such as mustard gas, the use of concentration camps in counter-insurgency, and attacks on Red Cross facilities. Italian authorities claimed that these actions were in response to the Ethiopians' use of Dum-Dum bullets, which had been banned by declaration IV, 3 of the Hague Convention, and mutilation of captured soldiers.

According to the Ethiopian government, 382,800 civilian deaths were directly attributable to the Italian invasion. 17,800 women and children were killed by bombing, 30,000 people were killed in the massacre of February 1937, 35,000 people died in concentration camps, and 300,000 people died of privations due to the destruction of their villages and farms. The Ethiopian government also claimed that the Italians destroyed 2,000 churches and 525,000 houses, while confiscating or slaughtering 6 million cattle, 7 million sheep and goats, and 1.7 million horses, mules, and camels, leading to the latter deaths.

During the 1937–1941 Italian occupation, atrocities also occurred; in the February 1937 Yekatit 12 massacres as many as 30,000 Ethiopians may have been killed and many more imprisoned as a reprisal for the attempted assassination of Viceroy Rodolfo Graziani. A 2017 study estimated that 19,200 were killed - a fifth of the population of Addis Ababa. The Ethiopian Orthodox Tewahedo Church was especially singled out. Thousands of Ethiopians also died in concentration camps such as Danane and Nocra.

== Spanish Civil War ==
75,000 Italian soldiers of the Corpo Truppe Volontarie fought on the side of the Nationalists during the Spanish Civil War, as did 7,000 men of the Aviazione Legionaria. While they also bombed valid military targets such as the railway infrastructure of Xativa, the Italian air force partook in many bombings of civilian targets for the purposes of "weakening the morale of the Reds". One of the more notable bombings was the Bombing of Barcelona, in which 1,300 civilians were killed, with thousands more being wounded or dehoused. Other cities subjected to terror bombing by the Italians included Durango, Alicante, Granollers, and Guernica.

During the Italian occupation of Mallorca, from 1936–1939, Italian forces, led by Fascist Blackshirt leader Arconovaldo Bonaccorsi, initiated a brutal reign of terror, arranging the murder of 3,000 people accused of being Communists, and emptying Mallorca's prisons by having all prisoners shot.

Documents found in British archives by the historian Effie Pedaliu and documents found in Italian archives by the Italian historian Davide Conti, revealed that the memory of the existence of the Italian concentration camps and Italian war crimes committed during the Spanish Civil War had been repressed due to the Cold War.

== World War II ==
After the end of World War II in Europe, Italian officials, academics and media outlets "re-invented Italy as a victim, gulling the rest of the world into acclaiming the Good Italian long before Captain Corelli strummed a mandolin." The Italian government steadfastly refused requests to turn over suspected war criminals to Yugoslavian, Greek, Albanian, Ethiopian or Libyan authorities. In an effort to keep Italy within the Western sphere of influence, the British and American governments did not pressure Italian officials to extradite the suspects. Fillipo Focardi, a historian at Rome's German Historical Institute, discovered archived documents showing how Italian civil servants were told to avoid extraditions. A typical instruction was issued by the Italian prime minister, Alcide De Gasperi, reading: "Try to gain time, avoid answering requests."

A number of suspects, known to be on the list of Italian war criminals that Yugoslavia, Greece and Ethiopia requested an extradition of, at the end of World War II never saw anything like the Nuremberg trial, because with the beginning of the Cold War, Anglo-American officials saw in Pietro Badoglio, who was also on the list, a guarantee of an anti-communist post-war Italy.

=== Yugoslavia ===
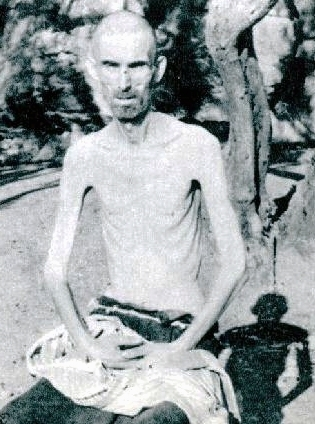
Prisoner in the Italian concentration camp on Rab, where they incarcerated 15,000 Slovene and Croatian civilians, among them many women and children, and over 3,500 civilians are estimated to have died in the camp.

In April 1941, Italy invaded Yugoslavia, occupying large portions of Slovenia, Croatia, Bosnia, Montenegro, Serbia and Macedonia, while directly annexing to Italy the Ljubljana Province, Gorski Kotar and Central Dalmatia, along with most Croatian islands. To suppress the mounting resistance led by the Slovenian and Croatian Partisans, the Italians adopted tactics of "summary executions, hostage-taking, reprisals, internments and the burning of houses and villages. To regain military momentum, the Italians persuaded the Chetniks to become their subordinates. Mario Roatta recruited Serbs to help counteract German control in Croatia. The Chetniks were to occupy territories cleared by Axis rastrellamenti instead of the pro-German Croatians. Roatta, like his fellow commanders, was wary that Wehrmacht generals would not honor Hitler’s repeated verbal promises to respect Italy’s long-standing imperial claims in Yugoslavia. In exchange for their cooperation, the Chetniks expected Italy to turn a blind eye while they avenged themselves against Muslims and conducted retaliatory raids on Croatian communities. Although Roatta did not support such vengeance due to the distress it caused in Zagreb, his occasional warnings to the Chetniks to restrain themselves were ineffective. Many field commanders preferred to spare their troops by using Chetniks and collaborators to undertake the unpleasant task of rooting out partisans.

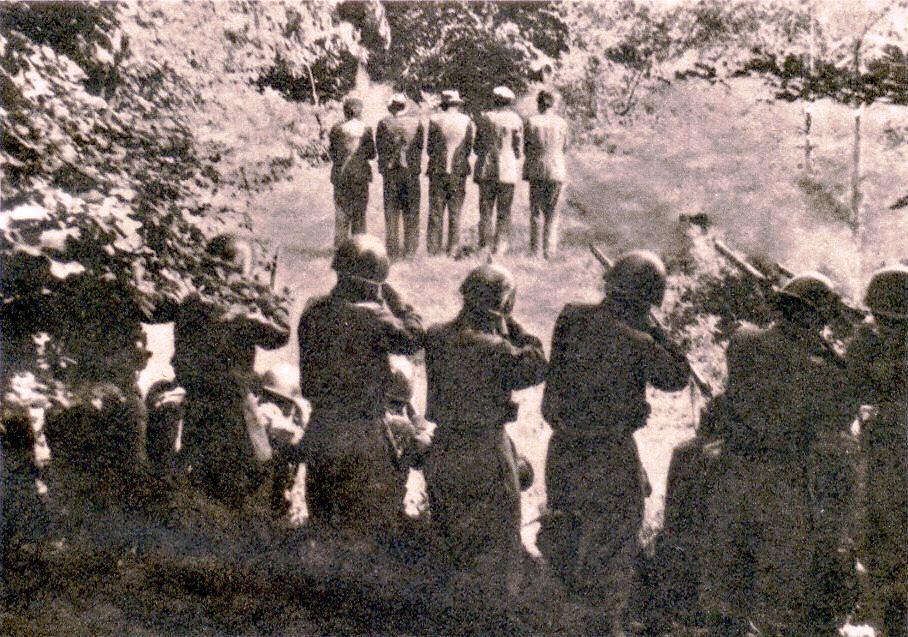
Italian soldiers shooting Slovenian civilian hostages from the village Dane, Loška dolina

In May 1942 Mussolini told Mario Roatta, commander of the Italian 2nd Army, that "the best situation is when the enemy is dead. So we must take numerous hostages and shoot them whenever necessary." To implement this Roatta suggested the closure of the Province of Fiume and Croatia, the evacuation of people in the east of the former frontiers to a distance of 3–4 km inland, the organization of border patrols to kill anyone attempting to cross, the mass internment of "twenty to thirty thousand persons" to Italian concentration camps, burning down houses, and the confiscation of property from villagers suspected of having contact with Partisans for families of Italian soldiers. He also mentioned the need to extend the plan to Dalmatia and for the construction of concentration camps. Roatta insisted, "If necessary don't shy away from using cruelty. It must be a complete cleansing. We need to intern all the inhabitants and put Italian families in their place."

==== Italian concentration camps ====
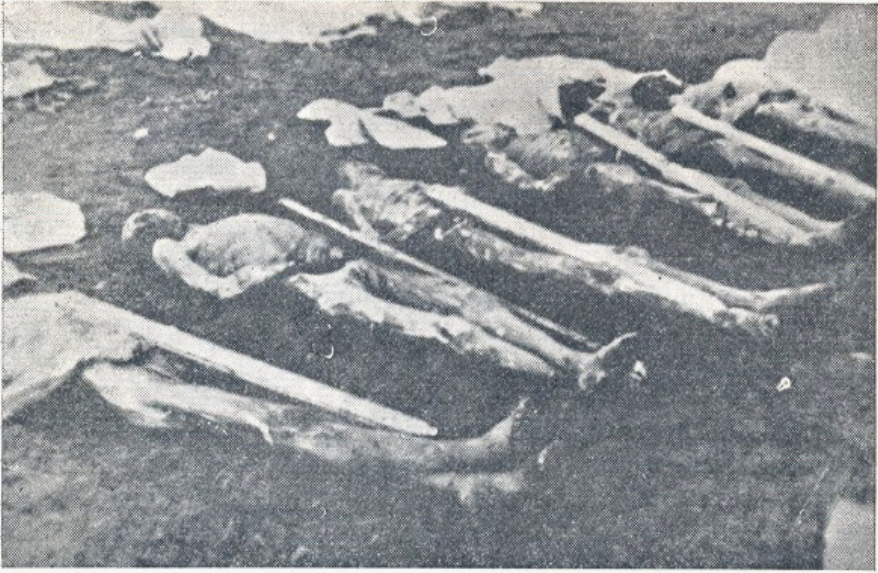
Dead inmates from the Rab concentration camp, one of many Italian concentration camps for civilians from Yugoslavia

In the Province of Ljubljana, alone, the Italians sent some 25,000 to 40,000 Slovene civilians to concentration camps, which equalled 7.5% to 12% of its total population. The Italians also sent tens of thousands of Croats, Serbs, Montenegrins and others to concentration camps, including many women and children. 80,000 people from Dalmatia (12% of the population) passed through various Italian concentration camps. 98,703 Montenegrin civilians (one-third of the entire population of Montenegro) were sent to Italian concentration camps. The operation, one of the most drastic in Europe, filled up many Italian concentration camps, such as Rab, Gonars, Monigo, Renicci di Anghiari, Molat and elsewhere. Among the 10,619 civilians held in October 1942 in just the Rab concentration camp, 3,413 were women and children, with children accounting for 1,422 of the prisoners. Over 3,500 internees died at Rab alone, including at least 163 children listed by name, giving it a mortality rate of 18%. Around 1,000 internees died in the Molat camp, while over 500 died in the Gonars camp, including 93 children. Concentration camp survivors received no compensation from the Italian state after the war.

==== Mass killings of civilians and hostages ====
In retaliation for Partisan actions during the Uprising in Montenegro, Italian forces, under the command of General Alessandro Pirzio Biroli, killed 74 Montenegrin civilians and captured Partisans in Pljevlja on 2 December 1941. Italian forces committed further massacres on 14 December 1941, in the villages of Babina Vlaka, Jabuka and Mihailovici, destroying homes and killing 120 Montenegrin civilians.

In early July 1942, Italian troops operating opposite Fiume were reported to have shot and killed 800 Croat and Slovene civilians and burned down 20 houses near Split on the Dalmatian coast. On 12 July 1942, Italian forces killed around 100 Croat civilians in the Podhum massacre, and deported another 889 civilians to concentration camps. Later that month, the Italian Air Force was reported to have practically destroyed four Yugoslav villages near Prozor, killing hundreds of civilians in revenge for a local guerrilla attack that resulted in the death of two high-ranking officers. In the second week of August 1942, Italian troops were reported to have burned down six Croatian villages and shot dead more than 200 civilians in retaliation for guerrilla attacks. In September 1942, the Italian Army was reported to have destroyed 100 villages in Slovenia and killed 7,000 villagers in reprisal for local guerrilla attacks.

On 16 November 1942, after a Partisan attack on a military truck convoy, Italian forces launched a combined and indiscriminate land, air and naval bombardment targeting the small Croatian town of Primošten in reprisal. Some 150 civilians were killed in the attack, nearby villages were also burned and 200 citizens were arrested.

Throughout January 1943, Italian forces belonging to the "Lombardia" and "Re" divisions, launched large anti-Partisan operations in the Lika region, around Gospić. During the operation, Italian forces razed 12 villages, destroying or burning around 2,806 homes and farms and killing 635 civilians.

During anti-Partisan operations in July 1943, Italian forces razed the village Žrnovnica and 23 surrounding hamlets. During these reprisals, Italian forces burned down about 900 houses, shot 97 civilians, interned 880 civilians and destroyed about 150 boats.

Italian authorities enacted a quota for civilian hostages to be shot in retaliation for Italian soldiers and citizens killed by Partisan attacks. In Dalmatia, five civilian hostages were to be executed for every Italian civilian killed and twenty civilian hostages were to be executed for every Italian officer or civil servant killed. Hostages were taken from the civilian population and were interned in concentration camps.

In other areas, the quota was more arbitrary. For example, Italian forces ordered the execution of 66 civilian hostages from Šibenik on 22 May 1943, in retaliation for 22 telegraph poles sabotaged by Partisans, a quota of three hostages for each telegraph pole damaged.

In Montenegro, the hostage quota was higher; in January 1942, the Governor of Montenegro ordered 50 civilian hostages to be executed for every Italian officer killed or wounded, and 10 civilian hostages to be executed for every Italian NCO and regular soldier killed or wounded.

Between 24 April and 24 June 1942, Italian forces executed more than 1,000 hostages from across the Province of Ljubljana. In the Šibenik district, 240 hostages were executed between 23 April and 15 June 1942, a further 470 civilians were killed in reprisals at the same time across other areas of Dalmatia. In late-June 1943, the Governor of Montenegro ordered the execution of 180 hostages from the Bar concentration camp.

On 11 October 1941, governor Giuseppe Bastianini, established the Extraordinary Tribunal for Dalmatia, a special judicial body operating within the Governorate of Dalmatia, with the task of judging political crimes and individuals belonging to Communist organizations. The Tribunal held four trials characterized by a hasty procedure without any guarantee for the accused, imposing forty-eight death sentences, of which thirty-five were executed, as well as thirty-seven prison sentences of different lengths.

A decree given by Mussolini on 24 October 1941, replaced the Extraordinary Tribunal with the Special Court for Dalmatia, which took over the tribunal's functionality and had wide jurisdiction. Like the Extraordinary Tribunal, the Special Court worked quickly, informally and arbitrarily. According to statistics from the Yugoslav State Commission of Crimes of the Occupier and Their Assistants, a total of 5,000 people became subject to proceedings in these Italian courts and the courts condemned 500 of them to death. The remainder were given punishments ranging from long prison sentences, being assigned to forced labour or being sent to concentration camps.

According to statistics collected through 1946 by the Commission for War Damages on the Territory of the People's Republic of Croatia, Italian authorities with their collaborators killed 30,795 civilians (not including those killed in concentration camps and prisons) in Dalmatia, Istria, Gorski Kotar and the Croatian Littoral, compared to 9,657 partisans.

In 2012, a Slovenian census determined that the Italian occupiers were responsible for the deaths of 6,400 Slovene civilians.

==== Other repressive anti-Partisan measures ====
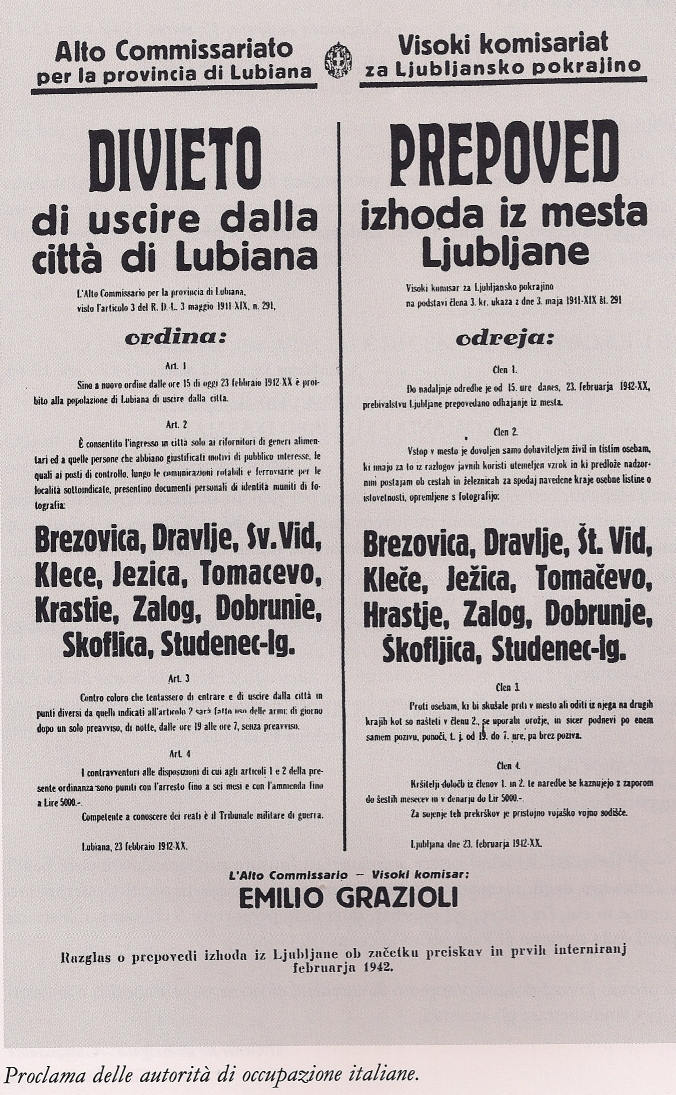
Italian poster forbidding exit from barbed-wire surrounded Ljubljana

On their own, or with their Nazi allies, the occupying Italian army undertook many armed actions, including brutal offensives intended to wipe out Partisan resistance. This included Operation Weiss in Bosnia, in which German, Italian and allied collaborative militia forces killed 12,000 Partisans, plus 3,370 civilians, while sending 1,722 civilians to concentration camps. During the Operation Schwarz offensive, German, Italian and allied troops killed 7,000 Partisans (two-thirds of the total 22,000 Partisan force were killed or wounded), and executed 2,537 civilians.

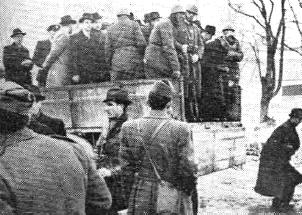
Italian mass arrests of civilians in Ljubljana in 1942, many of whom were sent to concentration camps or shot as hostages

In Ljubljana Province, in July 1941, the Italian army assembled 80,000 well-armed troops to attack 2,500-3,000 poorly armed Partisans, who had liberated large portions of the Province. Italian general Mario Robotti issued commands for all persons caught with arms or false identification papers to be shot on the spot, while most other men of military age were to be sent to concentration camps. All buildings from which shots were fired on Italian troops, or in which ammunition was found, or the owners showed hospitality to Partisans, were to be destroyed. Italian troops were ordered to burn crops, kill livestock and burn villages which supported Partisans. To destroy the resistance, the Italian occupiers also completely surrounded the capital city of Ljubljana with barbed wire, bunkers and control points. Civilians, particularly families of partisans and their supporters, were sent by the tens of thousands to Italian concentration camps, and in a meeting in Gorizia in July 1942, between Italian generals and Mussolini, they agreed to forcefully deport all 330,000 inhabitants of Ljubljana Province, if necessary, and replace them with Italians.

None of the Italians responsible for the many war crimes against Yugoslavs - including Generals Roatta and Robotti, Fascist Commissar Emilio Grazioli, etc - were ever brought to trial.

==== Destruction of cultural heritage ====
In 1942 Italian fascist troops completely destroyed the remains of medieval Cathedral of Saint Bartholomew in Knin, in order to build themselves their barracks and concrete bunkers.

=== Greece ===
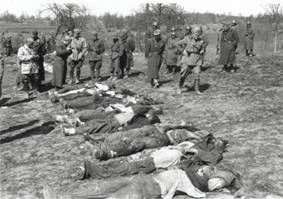
Italian troops walk among the bodies of Greek civilians executed during the Domenikon massacre.

A similar phenomenon took place in Greece in the immediate postwar years. The Italian occupation of Greece was often brutal, resulting in reprisals such as the Domenikon Massacre. The Greek government claimed that Italian occupation forces destroyed 110,000 buildings and via various causes inflicted economic damage of $6 billion (1938 exchange rates) while executing 11,000 civilians; in terms of the percentage of direct and indirect destruction this was almost identical to the figures attributed to German occupation forces. The Italians also presided over the Greek famine while occupying the majority of the country, and along with the Germans were responsible for it by initiating a policy of wide-scale plunder of everything of value in Greece, including food for its occupation forces. Ultimately, the Greek famine led to the deaths of 300,000 Greek civilians. Pope Pius XII, in a contemporary letter, directly blamed the Fascist Italian government for the deaths in addition to the Germans: "Axis authorities in Greece are robbing the starving population of their entire harvest of corn, grapes, olives, and currants; even vegetables, fish, milk, and butter are being seized... Italy is the occupying power and Italy is responsible for the proper feeding of the Greek people... after the war the story of Greece will be an indelible blot on the good name of Italy, at any rate Fascist Italy."

After two Italian filmmakers were jailed in the 1950s for depicting the Italian invasion of Greece and the subsequent occupation of the country as a "soft war", the Italian public and media were forced to repress their collective memory. The repression of memory led to historical revisionism in Italy and in 2003, the Italian media published Silvio Berlusconi's statement that Benito Mussolini only "used to send people on vacation".

=== Albania ===
Italy invaded the Albanian Kingdom on 7 April 1939. Albania was quickly overrun by the 12 April 1939, forcing its ruler, King Zog, into exile. Albania was then made a part of the Italian Empire as a protectorate in personal union with the Italian Crown. Italian citizens began to settle in Albania as colonists and to own land so that they could gradually transform it into Italian soil. The Italianization of Albania was one of Mussolini's plans.

From 1940, growing Albanian resistance to Italian rule led to an increase in repressive and punitive measures against the Albanian population. General Alessandro Pirzio Biroli gave his men a carte blanche (unlimited discretionary power to act) against Albanians, including civilians. From 14–18 July 1943, the Italian army conducted the "massacre of Mallakasha" in villages surrounding the town of Mallakastër. The army forces destroyed 80 Albanian villages and killed hundreds of civilians.

According to the Statistics of the Albanian National Institute of Resistance, the Italian and German occupiers were responsible for 28,000 dead, 12,600 wounded, 43,000 interned in concentration camps, 61,000 homes burned and 850 villages destroyed.

=== The Holocaust ===
==== Libya ====
After the passing of the anti-Semitic Manifesto of Race in 1938, conditions worsened for the Jews of Libya.

In 1942, 2,600 Jews were sent by Italian authorities to the Giado concentration camp, where they remained until they were liberated by British forces in January 1943. 564 prisoners died from typhus and other privations.

==== Soviet Union ====
In at least one recorded case, Italian forces taking part in the invasion of the Soviet Union, handed over a captured group of Jews to be killed by a German Einsatzkommando unit.

==== Italy ====
The oppression of Italian Jews began in 1938 with the enactment of Racial Laws of segregation by the fascist regime of Benito Mussolini. This changed in September 1943, when German forces occupied the country, installed the puppet state of the Italian Social Republic (RSI) and immediately began persecuting and deporting the Jews found there.

In November 1943, the Fascist authorities of the RSI declared Italian Jews to be of "enemy nationality" during the Congress of Verona and began to participate actively in the prosecution and arrest of Jews. Initially, after the Italian surrender, the Italian police had only assisted in the round-up of Jews when requested to do so by German authorities. With the Manifest of Verona, in which Jews were declared foreigners, and in times of war enemies, this changed. Police Order No. 5 on November 30, 1943, issued by Guido Buffarini Guidi, minister of the interior of the RSI, ordered the Italian police to arrest Jews and confiscate their property.

Approximately half of all Jews arrested during the Holocaust in Italy were arrested in 1944 by the Italian police.

Of the estimated 44,500 Jews living in Italy before September 1943, 7,680 were murdered during the Holocaust (mostly at Auschwitz), while nearly 37,000 survived.

=== List of Italian war criminals ===
This is a list of Italian high-ranking military personnel or other officials involved in acts of war. It includes also such personnel of lower rank that were accused of grave breaches of the laws of war. Inclusion of a person does not imply that the person was qualified as a war criminal by a court of justice. As noted in the relevant section, very few cases have been brought to court due to diplomatic activities of, notably, the government of the United Kingdom and subsequent general abolition.

The criterion for inclusion in the list is the existence of reliable documented sources.

- Benito Mussolini: In 1936, during the Second Italo-Ethiopian War, Mussolini ordered the manufacturing/purchase of hundreds of tons of yperite, phosgene, and fire munitions in the form of aerial bombs and artillery and mortar shells.
- Pietro Badoglio: In 1936, during the Second Italo-Ethiopian War, Badoglio approved, as commander in chief of the Italian army, the use of poisonous gas against enemy troops.
- Vincenzo Magliocco: During the Second Italo-Ethiopian War, Magliocco was one of the generals primarily responsible for carrying out orders to use chemical weapons. He was killed in action in 1936.
- Rodolfo Graziani: In 1950, a military tribunal sentenced Graziani to prison for a term of 19 years (but released after a few months) as punishment for his collaboration with the Nazis, when he was Minister of Defense of the Italian Social Republic. He was a key figure in the Pacification of Libya and authorized the mass killing of Ethiopians known as Yekatit 12.
- Pietro Maletti: During the Italian occupation of Ethiopia, Between May 18 and May 22, 1937, Italian and Libyan troops under the command of Maletti massacred between 1700 and 2100 people at the Debre Libanos Monastery, including all 297 monks and 23 lay people who served the monastery, and the many pilgrims who had come to celebrate the patron saint of the monastery. Maletti was killed in action in 1940.
- Emilio De Bono: Key figure in the Pacification of Libya. Ardent proponent of the use of poison gas and concentration camps, which resulted in the deaths of tens of thousands of civilians. Responsible for mass death sentences against resistance fighters. In 1944, De Bono was executed after being convicted at the Verona trial.
- Alessandro Pirzio Biroli: The Governor of the Italian governorate of Montenegro. He ordered that fifty Montenegrin civilians be executed for every Italian killed, and ten be executed for every Italian wounded. Biroli never stood trial and died in 1962.

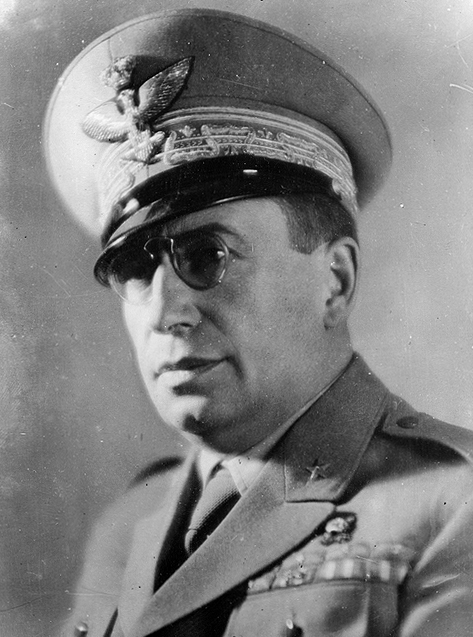
Mario Roatta (1887–1968): Italian General accused of War Crimes and called "The Beast" in Yugoslavia.

- Mario Roatta: In 1941–1943, during the 22-month existence of the Province of Ljubljana, Roatta ordered the deportation of 25,000 people, which equalled 7.5% of the total population. The operation, one of the most drastic in Europe, filled up Italian concentration camps on the island of Rab, in Gonars, Monigo (Treviso), Renicci d'Anghiari, Chiesanuova and elsewhere. The survivors received no compensation from the Italian state after the war. He had, as the commander of the 2nd Italian Army in Province of Ljubljana, ordered besides internments also summary executions, hostage-taking, and burning of houses and villages, for which after the war the Yugoslav government sought unsuccessfully to have him extradited for war crimes. He was quoted as saying "Non dente per dente, ma testa per dente" ("Not a tooth for a tooth but a head for a tooth"), while Robotti was quoted as saying "Non si ammazza abbastanza!" ("There are not enough killings") in 1942. "On 1 March 1942, he (Roatta) circulated a pamphlet entitled '3C' among his commanders that spelled out military reform and draconian measures to intimidate the Slav populations into silence by means of summary executions, hostage-taking, reprisals, internments and the burning of houses and villages. By his reckoning, military necessity knew no choice, and law required only lip service. Roatta's merciless suppression of partisan insurgency was not mitigated by his having saved the lives of both Serbs and Jews from the persecution of Italy's allies Germany and Croatia. Under his watch, the 2nd Army's record of violence against the Yugoslav population easily matched the Germans. Tantamount to a declaration of war on civilians, Roatta's '3C' pamphlet involved him in war crimes." One of Roatta's soldiers wrote home on July 1, 1942: "We have destroyed everything from top to bottom without sparing the innocent. We kill entire families every night, beating them to death or shooting them." As remembered by the Minister of Foreign Affairs in Mussolini government, Galeazzo Ciano, when describing a meeting with the secretary general of the Fascist party who wanted Italian army to kill all Slovenes:
  (...) I took the liberty of saying they (the Slovenes) totalled one million. It doesn't matter – he replied firmly – we should model ourselves upon ascari (auxiliary Eritrean troops infamous for their cruelty) and wipe them out".
- Mario Robotti: Commander of the Italian XI Corps in Slovenia and Croatia, issued an order in line with a directive received from Mussolini in June 1942: "I would not be opposed to all (sic) Slovenes being imprisoned and replaced by Italians. In other words, we should take steps to ensure that political and ethnic frontiers coincide." This qualified as ethnic cleansing policy.
- Nicola Bellomo was an Italian general who was tried and found guilty for killing a British prisoner of war and wounding another in 1941. He was one of the few Italians to be executed for war crimes by the Allies, and the only one executed by the British military.
- Italo Simonitti, a captain in the Italian Social Republic's 4th Monterosa Alpine division, was executed for his involvement in the 1945 execution of an American prisoner. He was the only Italian war criminal to be executed by the U.S. military. Simonitti's subordinate, Benedetto Pilon, received a life sentence. He was later transferred to Italian custody, but freed under an amnesty by Minister of Justice Attilio Piccioni in January 1951.
- Pietro Caruso was chief of the Fascist police in Rome while it was occupied by the Germans. He helped organize the Ardeatine massacre in March 1944. After Rome was liberated by the Allies he was tried that September by an Italian Court and subsequently executed.
- Guido Buffarini Guidi was the Minister of the Interior for the Italian Social Republic; shortly after the end of the war in Europe he was found guilty of war crimes by an Italian court and executed.
- Pietro Koch was head of the Banda Koch, a special task force of the Corpo di Polizia Repubblicana dedicated to hunting down partisans and rounding up deportees. His ruthless extremism was cause for concern even to his fellow fascists, who had him arrested in October 1944. Then he came into Allied captivity and was later convicted of war crimes by an Italian court and executed.

A number of names of Italians can be found in the CROWCASS list established by the Anglo-American Allies of the individuals wanted by Yugoslavia and Greece for war crimes.

== See also ==
- Italiani brava gente
- Italian nationalism
- Italian Empire
- Italian Fascism
- Italian Fascism and racism
- Military history of Italy
- Racism in Italy
- Anti-Italianism
- The Holocaust in Italy
- Internment of Italian Americans
- Italian Civil War
- List of war crimes
- War crimes in World War II
- Allied war crimes during World War II
- Axis war crimes in Italy
- British war crimes
- German war crimes
- Japanese war crimes
- Soviet war crimes
- United States war crimes

== Sources ==
- Gentile, Carlo (October 2005). The Police Transit Camps in Fossoli and Bolzano – Historical report in connection with the trial of Manfred Seifert.
- Lidia Santarelli: "Muted violence: Italian war crimes in occupied Greece", Journal of Modern Italian Studies, September 2004, vol. 9, no. 3, pp. 280–299(20); Routledge, part of the Taylor & Francis Group doi:10.1080/1354571042000254728
- Brignoli, Pietro (1973). Santa messa per i miei fucilati: Le spietate rappresaglie italiane contro i partigiani in Croazia dal diario di un cappellano (in Italian). Milan: Longanesi.
- H. James Burgwyn (2004): "General Roatta's war against the partisans in Yugoslavia: 1942", Journal of Modern Italian Studies, September vol. 9, no. 3, pp. 314–329(16) doi:10.1080/1354571042000254746
- Kersevan, Alessandra (2003). Un campo di concentramento fascista. Gonars 1942–1943 (in Italian). Gonars; Udine: Comune di Gonars; Kappa Vu. OCLC 56022465.
- Kersevan, Alessandra (2008). Lager italiani. Pulizia etnica e campi di concentramento fascisti per civili jugoslavi 1941–1943. Documenti (in Italian). Rome: Nutrimenti. ISBN 978-88-88389-94-3.
- Steinberg, Jonathan (2002). All Or Nothing: The Axis and the Holocaust, 1941–1943. Routledge. ISBN 978-0-415-29069-2.
- Yugoslav Information Office (1945). Italian Crimes in Yugoslavia (PDF) (Report). London: Yugoslav Information Office.
- Report on Italian War Crimes against Yugoslavia and its people (Report). Belgrade: The State Commission for the Investigation of War Crimes. 1946. OCLC 5186960.
