= Fascist Legacy =

- Genre: Documentary
- Written by: Ken Kirby; Michael Palumbo
- Directed by: Ken Kirby
- Narrated by: Michael Bryant
- Country of origin: United Kingdom
- Original language: English
- No. of series: 1
- No. of episodes: 2

Production
- Producer: Ken Kirby
- Cinematography: Nigel Walters
- Editor: George Farley
- Running time: 50 minutes
- Production company: BBC

Original release
- Network: BBC2
- Release: 1 November – 8 November 1989

Fascist Legacy is a 1989 BBC documentary TV miniseries about Italian war crimes during World War II. It consists of two parts.

The first part itself consists of two sections and was aired on 1 November 1989, on BBC, under the title A Promise Fulfilled.

== Part one ==
Pietro Badoglio's use of mustard gas and his ordering of bombing of Red Cross-operated hospitals is shown in the first section. The emphasis is placed upon Italian war crimes committed during the Italian invasions of Ethiopia. The Italian revenge massacres after an attempted assassination of the Italian governor of Ethiopia are shown.

Italian war crimes committed against Slovene and Croatian civilians on the Italian-occupied territory of Kingdom of Yugoslavia are shown in the second section of the first part. The Rab concentration camp witnesses and atrocities in the Croatian village of Podhum near Rijeka are shown.

== Part two ==
The second part, called A Pledge Betrayed, aired on 8 November 1989, exposes British (and American) hypocrisy, which prevented extradition of 1,200 Italian war criminals (the most wanted were Pietro Badoglio, Mario Roatta and Rodolfo Graziani), for whom Yugoslavia, Greece and Ethiopia provided full documentation of their crimes.

The documentary's cynical conclusion is Churchill's quote about "the better tomorrow with a new world order."

== Historical truth ==
If Italian officers were prosecuted by the (British controlled) court at all, they were accused only of the death of the British prisoners of war, but not of the death of the civil population in occupied territories. It was on 9 September 1943, the day of Allies' invasion of the Italian mainland, when anti-fascist Nicola Bellomo then commander of the XII MVSN Zone, formed a makeshift Italian force and counterattacked Germans that tried to occupy the port of Bari . In this successful defence action, general Nicola Bellomo was wounded. As an anti-fascist, general Bellomo may have been considered a threat to the Badoglio government. Nicola Bellomo, as a gesture of military honour, preferred not to escape from the prison when the door was intentionally left open, after he was sentenced to death.

== Non-prosecution of Italian war criminals ==
Yugoslavia, Greece and Ethiopia requested extradition of 1,200 Italian war criminals who were however never prosecuted because the British and American governments with the beginning of Cold War saw in Pietro Badoglio a guarantee of an anti-communist post-war Italy.

== Italian public media ==
Italian public television RAI bought a copy of the film but for years it was never shown to an Italian audience because it would have challenged the prevailing view, which focused on the role of the Italian partisans fighting the Germans, and, while pointing at the Foibe massacres, not knowing or refusing to acknowledge Italian war crimes against ethnic Slovene civil population, a view that largely survives to this day, unlike in France where the memory of the French Resistance and that of Vichy France are both known to the public.

After in the 1950s two Italian film-makers were jailed for depicting the Italian invasion of Greece, the Italian public and media were forced into the repression of collective memory, which led to historical amnesia and eventually to historical revisionism.

In 2004 only the Italian private channel La7 has shown large excerpts of "Fascist Legacy". Showings of the documentary were also organized in Italy by groups with an anti-fascist orientation and members of the Slovene minority in Italy.

== See also ==
- Pacification of Libya
- Second Italo-Ethiopian War
- Italian invasion of Yugoslavia
- Italian invasion of Greece
- Italian concentration camps
- Italian war crimes
- Province of Ljubljana
