= Marija Strojnik Scholl =

Slovene astrophysicist

- Born: 13 July 1950 (age 76); Ljubljana, Yugoslavia
- Citizenship: United States of America
- Education: Arizona State University; University of Arizona
- Known for: developing a system for autonomous optical navigation
- Scientific career
- Fields: astrophysics, infrared technology, infrared spaceborne remote sensing
- Workplaces: Rockwell International; Honeywell; Jet Propulsion Laboratory; Centro de Investigaciones en Optica

Marija Strojnik Scholl (born 13 July 1950 in Ljubljana) is a Slovene astrophysicist currently working as a distinguished professor at the Optical Research Center in León, Mexico. She is best known for developing an autonomous system for optical navigation based on CCD technology which is currently used in nearly all commercial aircraft and numerous spacecraft, including in the NASA Cassini mission.

== Early life and education ==
Strojnik Scholl developed an interest in optics at an early age, when accompanying her father, Aleš Strojnik to work. After graduating from high school, she enrolled in the physics program at the University of Ljubljana; however, her parents emigrated to the United States soon after that, and she followed them to Tempe, Arizona. There, Strojnik Scholl finished her undergraduate studies at the Arizona State University in only two years, as the only woman in her class. She continued her postgraduate studies at the same university and received a M.S. degree in Physics in 1974. She finished a M.S. in Optical Sciences in 1977 at the University of Arizona and a M.S. in Engineering (Engineering Executive Program) in 1981 at the University of California, Los Angeles. She finished her doctorate degree in Optical Sciences in 1979 at the College of Optical Sciences at the University of Arizona, as the first woman in the history of the optics department.

== Career ==
Specializing in infrared physics, she became manager of the optics department at the Rockwell International corporation, then a senior engineer at Honeywell and at the Jet Propulsion Laboratory (JPL). At the JPL, she designed, developed and implemented a novel system for autonomous optical navigation using star charts and an intelligent CCD-based camera. This system is the basis for autonomous navigation in all commercial aircraft, in satellites forming the GPS network, and others. The autonomous navigation system was used to facilitate navigation of the NASA's Cassini–Huygens probe to Saturn in 2005. Strojnik Scholl received several NASA Certificates for creative development and technological innovations

Based on her merits, Strojnik Scholl became a distinguished professor at the Optical Research Center (Centro de Investigaciones en Optica) in Mexico where she has been working on a method for direct detection of exoplanets using interferometry. She is a Fellow of the Optical Society (OSA) and SPIE, and was the editor of the journal Applied Optics, Infrared for two terms in addition to the Infrared Physics and Technology and The Scientific World Journal.

In December 2022, The Mexican National Foundation for Science and Technology (Concejo Nacional de Ciencia y Tecnologia) and the Optical Research Institute (Centro de Investigaciones en Optica) named the Institute's library in Leon, Mexico in honor of Marija Strojnik. The library holds the largest collection of bibliographical materials in Optics and Photonics in Latin America. Marija is honored for being a distinguished national and international scientist, and in gratitude for her warmth, generosity with knowledge and for sharing experiences as a woman, a colleague, and a mentor. The second last name, Pogačar, is included on the commemorative plaque in tradition of Latin culture where a child is known by their father’s and mother’s last name.

In July 2022, Marija Strojnik became the elected president of the Sigma Xi, The Scientific Research Honor Society (ΣΞ), with nearly 60,000 members in the US and internationally. Its mission as an interdisciplinary society is to promote ethics and excellence in scientific and engineering research. It publishes a multidisplinary magazine American Scientist, dedicated to bringing science to every level of society.

Dr. Strojnik assumed the office of the president of Sigma Xi in July 2023. During Dr. Strojnik's tenure, the society increased membership, trimmed budget overrun twice, and recorded the highest levels of participation and attendance in 10 years at the annual meeting in Long Beach, California.

== Awards ==
- In 1996 she received 'The International Society for Optics and Photonics' (SPIE) George W. Goddard Award, as the first woman.
- In 1999 she was made an OSA Fellow.
- She is also member of the Mexican Academy of Sciences since 2001.
- In 1994 she was made a SPIE Fellow.
- In 2018, Professor Strojnik Scholl was awarded with the Emerita status to the Sistema Nacional de Investigadores (Mexican National Registry of Researchers).
- She was part of a temporal exposition named "Knowledge without Borders" organized by The Slovenian Museum of Technology (Tehniški muzej Slovenije, TMS).

== Personal life ==
Marija Strojnik Scholl has three daughters which she raised herself after her husband died because of lateral sclerosis. Two of them became scientists themselves. In 2008, Strojnik Scholl was diagnosed with cancer, which she has beaten several times with therapy.
