= Nicola Bellomo =

Nicola Bellomo may refer to:

- Nicola Bellomo (general) (1881–1945), Italian general
- Nicola Bellomo (footballer) (born 1991), Italian footballer
