= List of Croatian Righteous Among the Nations =

This is the list of Croatian Righteous Among the Nations. As of 1 February 2019, 117 Croatians have been honored with this title by Yad Vashem for saving Jews during World War II.

One of the Righteous, Sister Amadeja Pavlović (28 January 1895 – 26 November 1971), was the Superior of the Croatian province of the Sisters of Mercy of the Holy Cross in Đakovo from 1943–55. She rescued Zdenka Grunbaum, then a ten-year-old girl from Osijek; Grunbaum's family was killed in Đakovo. Grunbaum later moved to America, and started the initiative to have Pavlović recognized as Righteous Among the Nations. Pavlović was recognized as Righteous Among the Nations by Yad Vashem in 2008; Croatian president Stjepan Mesić attended the ceremony.

== List ==
- Bauer, Čedomir and Bauer, Branko (Zagreb)
- Beritić, Tihomil and Zina-Gertruda (Zagreb)
- Dolinar, Žarko and Boris
- Andrija Poklepović (Split)
- Kalogjera, Jakša - Ing. Who saved life of Lili Moravetz
- Ujević, Mate - Lexicographer who compiled the Croatian Encyclopedia (1938–1945)
- Vranetić, Ivan (Topusko)
- Rudimir Rudolf Roter (Potomje) - First Croatian journalist and among the first European journalists awarded with this honour
- Firinger, Kamilo (1893-1984) a lawyer, archivist, and historian from Osijek; saved three Jewish lives one of which is of Darko Fischer, awarded posthumously in 2023
