= Alessandra Kersevan =

Italian historian (born 1950)

- Born: 18 December 1950 (age 75); Monfalcone, Gorizia, Italy
- Education: University of Trieste
- Scientific career
- Fields: Contemporary history
- Workplaces: Udine, Italy

Alessandra Kersevan (born 18 December 1950) is a historian, author and editor living and working in Udine. She researches Italian modern history, including the Italian resistance movement and Italian war crimes. She is the editor of a group called Resistenza storica at Kappa Vu edizioni, an Italian publisher. Her research have caused a huge hate campaign against her from the political right environment, both institutional and extra-parliamentary.

== Research ==
Her research (confirmed by the documents found in British archives by the British historian Effie Pedaliu and by the Italian historians Costantino Di Sante and Davide Conti) pointed out that the memory of the existence of the Italian concentration camps and Italian war crimes in general has been repressed due to the Cold War. In the collective memory of the Italian public and media this has led to historical revisionism, in particular concerning post-war foibe massacres. Yugoslavia, Greece and Ethiopia requested extradition of 1,200 Italian war criminals who however never saw anything like the Nuremberg trial, because the British government, with the beginning of Cold War, saw in Pietro Badoglio a guarantee of an anti-communist post-war Italy.

In the 1950s, two Italian film-makers were jailed for depicting the Italian invasion of Greece. Kersevan attributes this to historic revisionism. She compares historic revisionism in Italy to the situation in France where she notes historic mythology is deconstructed. She gives the French people's understanding of the Vichy period as an example.

In 2003, Italian media reported that Silvio Berlusconi had said, "Benito Mussolini only used to send people on vacation". This gave weight and illustrated the thesis made by Kersevan.

== The 2012 diplomatic protest by the Ministry of foreign affairs of the Republic of Slovenia ==
In February 2012, Italian state TV talk show host Bruno Vespa televised a photograph from July 1942 depicting Italian troops killing civilian hostages in the Slovenian village of Dane and claimed that it showed the opposite. Killings like these, ordered by Italian general Mario Roatta, were widespread during the Fascist occupation of Slovenia. Kersevan, who was a guest on the show, objected, but Vespa did not apologise, and Maurizio Gasparri, a former Italian Minister of Communications - and once militant of the far right party Movimento Sociale Italiano - compared Kersevan to the KGB. A protest by the Ministry of foreign affairs of the Republic of Slovenia followed.

== Published works ==
- 1995 Porzûs. Dialoghi sopra un processo da rifare, Kappavu, Udine, 215 pp, ISBN 9788889808 about Porzûs massacre
- 2003 Un campo di concentramento fascista. Gonars 1942-1943, Comune di Gonars/Kappavu, Udine, 389 pp, ISBN 9788889808 about Gonars concentration camp
- 2008 Lager italiani : Pulizia etnica e campi di concentramento Fascisti per civili Jugoslavi 1941-1943, Nutrimenti edizioni, Rome, 288 pp, ISBN 8888389946

== Editorial and co-editor contributions ==
- 2008 Foibe - Revisionismo di stato e amnesie della repubblica

== See also ==
- Foibe massacres
- Italian war crimes
