= Marjatta Hietala =

Finnish historian (born 1943)

Marjatta Hietala (née Puusa, born 19 June 1943) is a Finnish historian specialising in urban history and the history of innovations. She is professor emerita of General History at the University of Tampere.

Hietala introduced in Finland the study of innovations and international contacts. She has held a range of positions of trust both in Finland and internationally.

== Education ==
Hietala read general history, Finnish and Scandinavian history, statistics, sociology and politics at the University of Helsinki, gaining her MA in 1968, Licentiate degree in 1970 and master's degree in Social Sciences in 1971. Her PhD (1975) analysed German right-wing and militaristic nationalism on the basis of the works by Ernst Jünger and his associates. Hietala's doctoral dissertation paved the way for using content analysis and statistical methods in Finnish historiography.

Hietala's doctoral work brought her into close contact with the school of thought on the history of ideas headed by Professor Aira Kemiläinen at the University of Jyväskylä. As a result, she co-worked with Kemiläinen on the history of racial hygiene. This also informed her interest in intellectual and urban history, and the spread of innovations and international contacts.

== Career ==
Hietala opened her research career in the Ministry of the Interior and the Prime Minister's Office. She then moved on to serve as an Assistant in the Department of History at the University of Helsinki and as a Senior Researcher of the Academy of Finland. In 1994–1996, she was only the third woman to hold a Chair of General History in a Finnish university (at the University of Joensuu). Her two female predecessors were Professors Alma Söderhjelm (appointed in 1927) and Hietala's teacher and mentor Aira Kemiläinen (appointed in 1971). Hietala became professor of General History at the University of Tampere in 1996, and occupied this post until 2011 apart from a five-year period as an Academy Professor with the Academy of Finland in 2002–2007.

In Tampere, a group of researchers congregated around Marjatta Hietala, with a focus on the history of science and innovations, and intellectual and urban history. It was in this group that her successor in Tampere, Marjaana Niemi, completed her academic training.

== Focus of teaching and research ==
In the study of history Marjatta Hietala has applied a range of methods typically used in the natural sciences, especially quantitative methods involving the analysis of long time series. She has also encouraged participation in international research groups, and has herself done comparative research in, for example, Germany and the United States. Her studies on urban history and the spread of innovations show that Finland was among the first nations to adopt technological advances (such as telephones and street lighting) at the end of the 19th century and in the opening decades of the 20th century. Hietala's comparative methods on the spread of innovations are widely used internationally.

== Selected publications ==
- Marjatta Hietala & Marjatta Bell (2017), Helsinki, Finland’s Innovative Capital. Helsinki: Finnish Literature Society. ISBN 9789522228833
- Marjatta Hietala (2017), Finnisch-deutsche Wissenschaftskontakte. Zusammenarbeit in Ausbildung, Forschung und Praxis im 19. und 20. Jahrhundert. Aue Stiftung & Berliner Wissenschafts-Verlag. ISBN 978-3-8305-1747-4
- Katia Pizzi & Marjatta Hietala, Eds (2016), Cold War Cities: History, Memory and Culture. London: Peter Lang. ISBN 9783034317665
- Marjatta Hietala, Martti Helminen & Merja Lahtinen, Eds (2009), Helsinki. Helsingfors. Historic Towns Atlas, Scandinavian Atlas of Historic Towns. Helsinki: Helsinki Urban Facts. ISBN 9789522233301
- Marjatta Hietala, Ed. (2006), Tutkijat ja sota. Suomalaisten tutkijoiden kontakteja ja kohtaloita toisen maailmansodan aikana [Academics and the war. The contacts and fates of Finnish academics during the Second World War]. Helsinki: Finnish Literature Society.
- Marjatta Hietala & Tanja Vahtikari, Eds (2003), Landscape of Food: The Food Relationship of Town and Country in Modern Times. Finnish Literature Society. ISBN 9789517464789
- Marjatta Hietala & Lars Nilsson, Eds (1999), Women in Towns: The Social Position of Urban Women in a Historical Context. Stads- och kommunhistoriska institutet, Historiska institutionen, Stockholms universitet & Finnish Historical Society. ISBN 951-710-105-8
- Marjatta Hietala (1992), Innovaatioiden ja kansainvälistymisen vuosikymmenet. Helsinki eurooppalaisessa kehityksessä 1875-1917, I [The decades of innovations and internationalization. Helsinki in the perspective of European development, 1875–1917, vol. I]. Helsinki: Finnish Historical Society.
- Marjatta Hietala (1987), Services and Urbanization at the Turn of the Century: The Diffusion of Innovations. Helsinki: Finnish Historical Society. ISBN 951-9254-88-9
- Marjatta Hietala (1975), Der neue Nationalismus in der Publizistik Ernst Jüngers und des Kreises um ihn 1920–1933. Helsinki: Finnish Academy of Science and Letters. ISBN 951-41-0255-X

== Family ==
Marjatta Hietala is married to Kari Hietala, a researcher. They have three children and seven grandchildren. Hietala's parents Nikolai and Maire Puusa were evacuees from the part of Finnish Karelia ceded to the Soviet Union in the Second World War.
