= Centro de Investigaciones en Optica =

Mexican research center

Centro de Investigaciones en Optica (also known as CIO) is a research center in the field of optics, which is a branch of physics. CIO is located in the city of Leon in the state of Guanajuato in Mexico (approximately at 21°09'12.02"N 101°42'15.84"W). It also has an industrial research facility in the city of Aguascalientes.

== History ==
CIO was established in 1980 and has grown to become one of Mexico's leading optics research institutions.

== Research ==
The center has 62 researchers. It is split into two sub-departments known as "divisions", which are Optics and Photonics.

=== Optics ===
In this division researchers are dedicated to problems in classical optics, optical design and engineering, holography, interferometry, polarimetry, vision, etc.

=== Photonics ===
In this division researchers are dedicated to problems in optical properties of matter, optical fibers, nanomaterials, ultrafast optics, terahertz, dynamic systems, photonic crystals, etc.

== Teaching ==
All the academic There are 3 graduate programmes offered by the center:

- Master of Optomechatronics [MOm]. Is a recently created programme that aims to produce highly qualified graduates with a profile appropriate to work in industrial problems.
- Master of Science (Optics) [MSc]. Is a programme aims to produce highly qualified graduates with a profile appropriate to follow an academic career for teaching and if desired for research after a doctorate.
- Doctor of Science (Optics) [DSc] Is a programme aims to produce highly qualified researchers with a profile appropriate to follow an academic career.

All three programmes include a number of courses that have to be fulfilled by the student followed by the preparation of a thesis which has to resolve an industrial (or related) problem in the case of the MOm degree or a research problem in the case of the other two programmes followed by an oral thesis defense.

== Knowledge transfer ==
The direccion de tecnologia e inovacion manage the Centers's intellectual property portfolio, working with the Center researchers who wish to commercialise their work by identifying, protecting and marketing technologies through patenting and licensing as well as selling institutional consulting to companies.

DTI provides researchers with commercial advice, funds patent applications and legal costs, negotiates third-party licences and identifies and manages consultancy opportunities for researchers at the center.

== Administration ==
Administratively the center is divided into four directions:

1. Research (Direccion de Investigacion). This direction is in charge of all the research done in the center. It has certain administrative responsibilities, especially related to
2. Academic (Direccion de Formacion Academica).
3. Knowledge transfer (Direccion de Tecnologia e Inovacion).
4. Administration (Direccion Administrativa).

Centro de Investigaciones en Optica is a CONACYT research center that depends on the National Council for Science and Technology of Mexico, similar to the national laboratories of the US.
