= Ivan Vranetić =

Croatian humanitarian (died 2010)

- 'איוואן ורנטיץ
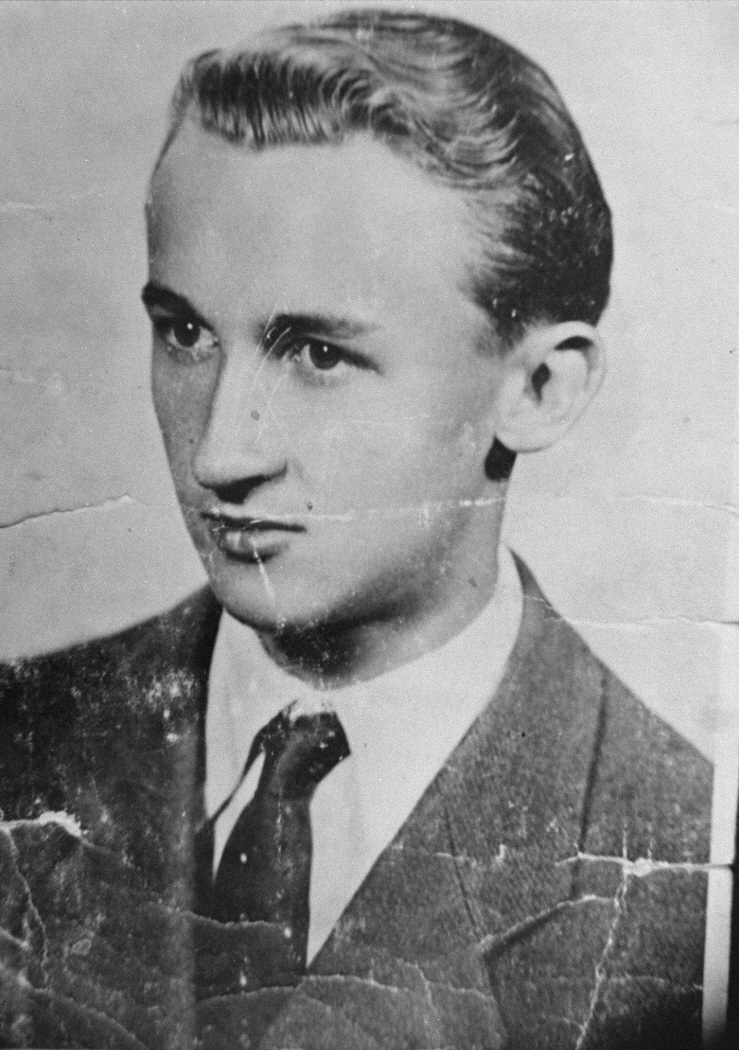
- Vranetić at around age 19-20
- Born: 1925/1926; Vrbas, Kingdom of Yugoslavia, (now Bosnia and Herzegovina)
- Died: 3 February 2010 (aged 84); State of Israel
- Occupations: Partisan, humanitarian, chairman of the Organization of Righteous Among the Nations in Israel
- Spouse: Erna Montilio Vranetić

Ivan "Ivica" Vranetić (Hebrew: איוואן ורנטיץ'; 1925/1926 – 3 February 2010) was a Yugoslav partisan of ethnic Croatian descent, whose aid to Jewish people during World War II resulted in his inclusion among the "Righteous Among the Nations" by Yad Vashem in 1970. For more than two decades, he was Chairman of the Righteous Among the Nations organization.

== Biography ==
Vranetić is believed to have been born in 1925 or 1926 in Vrbas, Donji Vakuf, Yugoslavia (present-day Bosnia & Herzegovina) and raised in Topusko (present-day Republic of Croatia). He grew up in a liberal, middle-class, Catholic household. Although his parents were not particularly religious, Vranetić said he was raised to love and respect others.

Vranetić began helping Jewish refugees at the age of 17 even though his village largely supported the Nazi-linked Ustaše. His first attempt to help a Jewish doctor resulted in a beating by a Croatian soldier which caused Vranetić to lose hearing in his left ear. He went on to help many others find secure hiding places and to supply their needs. Among the refugees he assisted was Erna Montilio, whose husband had been murdered at the infamous Jasenovac concentration camp. Erna, together with her mother, sister, and daughter, managed to escape to Dalmatia. They lived there in relative peace until mid-1943, when the Italians sent all the Jewish and Slovenian refugees there to Rab concentration camp in the Adriatic.

In 1948, Erna and her daughter moved to Israel where she married and had two more children. But the marriage did not last. After the war, Vranetić continued to communicate with her and other refugees he had helped, eventually moving to Israel in 1963 and marrying Montilio. He was granted honorary Israeli citizenship by the government of Israel. In 1970, he received his "Righteous Among the Nations" award from Yad Vashem for his work, becoming chairman of the Organization of Righteous Among the Nations in Israel in 1986, a position he held for more than twenty years.

Widowed in the late 1990s, Vranetić was honored during a memorial ceremony at the Yad Vashem Hall of Remembrance in 2009 when he and six Jewish Holocaust survivors met Pope Benedict XVI.

== Death ==
Ivan Vranetić died in Israel on 3 February 2010. Most sources gave his age as 84.
