= Mihael Montiljo =

Croatian Jewish cultural activist and lawyer

Personal details
- Born: 16 May 1928 Sarajevo, Kingdom of Yugoslavia (now Sarajevo, Bosnia and Herzegovina)
- Died: 17 December 2006 (aged 78) Zagreb, Croatia
- Education: University of Zagreb
- Occupation: Lawyer, activist, politician

Mihael Mišo Montiljo (16 May 1928 – 17 December 2006) was a Croatian cultural activist, assistant to Foreign Minister of Croatia, and vice president of the Bet Israel community in Zagreb.

Montiljo was born on 16 May 1928 in Sarajevo to a poor Sephardic Jewish family of Isak and Sara (née Papo) Montiljo. His ancestors emigrated from Spain and settled in Sarajevo 500 years prior when they fled the Spanish Inquisition. In 1941, during World War II, Montiljo and his family were imprisoned at the Sarajevo camp. Montiljo later escaped to Dalmatia, where in 1943 he was again imprisoned, but this time at the Rab concentration camp. After a successful escape in September 1943, he joined the Partisans. After the war, Montiljo attended and finished the Faculty of Law at the University of Zagreb. For more than 30 years, he worked on the protocol and consular affairs for the Socialist Republic of Croatia government. He was engaged in international public law as a consultant and assistant foreign relations. From 1990 to 1992, Montiljo worked as assistant to Foreign Minister of Croatia. Montiljo founded the "Croatian-Israeli society", choir "Lira", and was an active member of the Jewish Community in Zagreb before he founded the Jewish community Bet Israel with Ivo and Slavko Goldstein.

For his cultural contribution, Montiljo was awarded with Order of Danica Hrvatska by President of Croatia Stjepan Mesić. Montiljo died in Zagreb on 17 December 2006 and is buried at the Mirogoj Cemetery.

== Bibliography ==
- Hofman, Nila Ginger (2005). Renewed Survival: Jewish Community Life in Croatia. Lanham, Maryland: Lexington Books (Rowman & Littlefield Publishing Group). ISBN 978-07391-1330-1.
- Kraus, Ognjen (1998). Dva stoljeća povijesti i kulture Židova u Zagrebu i Hrvatskoj. Zagreb: Židovska općina Zagreb. ISBN 953-96836-2-9.
- Romano, Jaša (1980). Jevreji Jugoslavije 1941-1945: žrtve genocida i učesnici narodnooslobodilačkog rata. Beograd: Jevrejski Istorijski Muzej, Saveza jevrejskih opština Jugoslavije.
