= Strojnik S-2 =

American motorglider

S-2

General information
- Type: Motor glider
- National origin: United States
- Designer: Aleš Strojnik
- Status: Production completed
- Number built: at least 8

History
- Introduction date: 1980
- First flight: 1980

The Strojnik S-2 is an American high-wing, single-seat motor glider that was designed and built by Aleš Strojnik.

== Design and development ==
Strojnik completed and flew his S-2 design in 1980.

The S-2 is of mixed construction. The 49.2 ft (15 m) span wings consist of fiberglass skins built around a carbon fiber and aluminium spars. The wings employ a Wortmann FX 67-170/17 airfoil and have flaps for glidepath control. The wings are a constant chord design, with tapered wing tips. The fuselage is a pod-and-boom design, with the cockpit area made from wood, covered in fiberglass and the tail boom made from aluminium. The tail surfaces are of carbon fiber structure, covered in fiberglass. The powerplant is a Kohler Company engine of 28 hp (21 kW) that drives a folding two-bladed propeller. The engine is mounted in pusher configuration behind the cockpit, with the tail boom running underneath the propeller. The landing gear consists of two small wheels mounted in tandem on the fuselage centerline.

A two-seat version with the same external dimensions was reportedly under development in 1983.

Strojnik reported that 22 sets of plans had been sold by 1983.

== Operational history ==
Strojnik earned his silver badge flying the S-2. The prototype S-2 is no longer on the Federal Aviation Administration registry, but at least eight were built and in July 2011 six remain on the US register, including three S-2s and three S-2As.

== Variants ==
S-2
Initial version
S-2A
Improved version
S-4 "Laminar Magic"
One-off, registration number N85AS. Smaller, short-wing version, which set a US national aviation speed record in FAI Category C-1a/0 (European microlight, under 300kg gross weight) in 1987.
S-5
One-off aircraft, registration number N51152. Added slightly greater wingspan to existing S-4 fuselage for better performance in recreational flying.

== Specifications (S-2) ==
Data from Sailplane Directory and Soaring

General characteristics

- Crew: one
- Length: 22.6 ft (6.9 m)
- Wingspan: 49.2 ft (15.0 m)
- Wing area: 127 sq ft (11.8 m^{2})
- Aspect ratio: 19:1
- Airfoil: Wortmann FX 67-170/17
- Empty weight: 617 lb (280 kg)
- Gross weight: 980 lb (445 kg)
- Powerplant: 1 × Kohler Company , 28 hp (21 kW)
- Propellers: 2-bladed folding

Performance

- Stall speed: 38 mph (61 km/h, 33 kn) at a wing loading of 6.6 lb/sq ft
- Never exceed speed: 149 mph (240 km/h, 129 kn)
- Maximum glide ratio: 34:1 at 55 mph (89 km/h)
- Rate of climb: 350 ft/min (1.8 m/s)
- Rate of sink: 132 ft/min (0.67 m/s) at 42 mph (68 km/h)
- Wing loading: 7.7 lb/sq ft (38 kg/m^{2})

== See also ==
- List of gliders
