= Ivan Rein =

Croatian painter

- Ivan Rein around 1925
- Born: 9 September 1905; Osijek, Croatia-Slavonia, Austria-Hungary (now Croatia)
- Died: 12 December 1943 (aged 38); Sisak, Independent State of Croatia (now Croatia)
- Education: University of Zagreb
- Occupation: Painter

Ivan Rein (9 September 1905 – 12 December 1943) was a Croatian-Jewish painter.

== Early life and education ==
Rein was born in Osijek into a Jewish family. His father Mavro Rein was Osijek's prominent judge and a lawyer, his mother Olga (née Hönigsberg) came from a Zagreb's wealthy Jewish family, who owned a leather factory and the famous Caffé Zagreb. Rein had a sister, Renata. From his early age Rein learned languages, literature, philosophy, art and music. Rein attended the private school of Josip Leović, where he learned painting. He went to Osijek gymnasium, and was sitting together with Oscar Nemon, the Croatian sculptor. In 1924 Rein went to Vienna where he enrolled to study architecture. With the support of his parents, Rein abandoned his studies in Vienna, and in 1925 returned to his family, which in the meantime moved to Zagreb. In Zagreb he started to attend the study of painting at the Academy of Fine Arts Zagreb in the class of the famous Croatian painter Vladimir Becić.

== Career and later life ==
Upon the completion of his study at the academy, in 1929, Rein moved to Paris and settled in the Latin Quarter. With having excellent knowledge of foreign languages, particularly French, Rein quickly turned to an artistic life. In 1933 he had his first solo exhibition in Paris and in 1934 he participated at the first annual exhibition of Croatian artists in Zagreb.

The Spanish Civil War deeply shocked Rein, as he joined the international anti-war movement that opposed the emerging Fascism. The suffering of innocent people and death become almost obsessive theme for Rein, as they are illustrated in his works.

In 1937 Rein attended the exhibition of Yugoslav artists in Paris, where he exhibited nine works. He participated in 1939 at the exhibition of Yugoslav painters and sculptors hosted at the Bernheim-Jeune gallery in Paris. After the Nazi occupation of France, in 1940 Rein returned to Zagreb where he participated in the exhibitions until the Nazi occupation of Yugoslavia in 1941.

Due to the frequent persecution of Croatian Jews, Rein escaped to Gorski Kotar, but in 1942 he ended up in the concentration camp Kraljevica. In the camp, Rein taught children and his friends to draw and paint. In 1943 the Italians closed the camp in Kraljevica and moved all prisoners to the Rab concentration camp.

After the capitulation of Italy and the liberation of the camp, Rein joined the Partisans.

At the end of 1943, Rein was seriously wounded and caught by Ustaše. After torture and unsuccessful surgery, he died in the Sisak hospital on 12 December 1943. That same year his parents were killed at the Jasenovac and Stara Gradiška concentration camps. His sister was the only member of the family who survived the Holocaust, and after the war she moved to Canada where she lived until her death.

== Legacy ==
After the war 900 of Rein's works, of nearly 2000 that he created while in Paris, were saved and delivered to Croatia. In the early 1980, after reanimation, research, through the exhibitions and monographs devoted to Rein, his saved works were presented to wider audience. Exhibitions of Reins works are often presented across Croatia in the various Museums and galleries.
