= Rab concentration camp =

Concentration camp run by Italy during WWII

Coordinates: 44°46′48.00″N 14°43′08.40″E

Rab
- Italian concentration camp
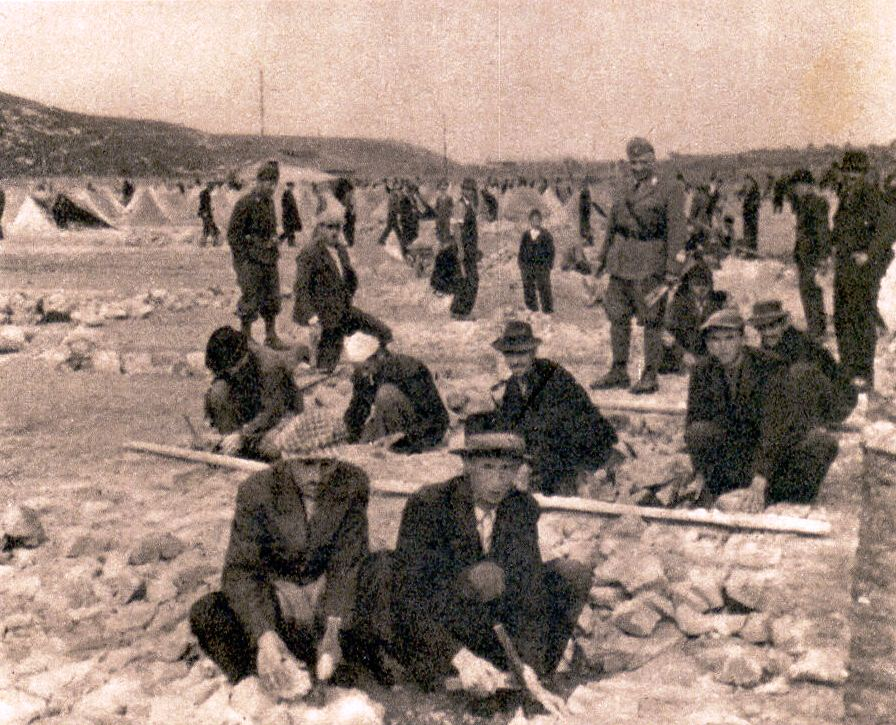
- Prisoners under the control of an Italian official
- Location: Rab, Province of Fiume, Kingdom of Italy
- Operated by: Royal Italian Army
- Operational: 28 June 1942 – 8 September 1943
- Inmates: Slovenes, Croats and Jews
- Number of inmates: 15,000
- Killed: 3,500 – 4,641
- Liberated by: Yugoslav Partisans

The Rab concentration camp (Italian: Campo di concentramento per internati civili di Guerra – Arbe; Croatian: Koncentracijski logor Rab; Slovene: Koncentracijsko taborišče Rab) was one of several Italian concentration camps. It was established during World War II, in July 1942, on the Italian-annexed island of Rab (now in Croatia).

According to historians James Walston and Carlo Spartaco Capogeco, at 18%, the annual mortality rate in the camp was higher than the average mortality rate in the Nazi concentration camp of Buchenwald (15%). According to a report by Monsignor Jože Srebrnič, Bishop of Krk on 5 August 1943 to Pope Pius XII: "witnesses, who took part in the burials, state unequivocally that the number of the dead totals at least 3,500". According to Yugoslav estimates of the Commission for Determining the Crimes of the Occupiers, 4,641 detainees died at the camp, including 800 inmates who died while being transported from Rab to the Gonars and Padua concentration camps in Italy. However, other sources place the figure at around 2,000.

In July 1943, after the fall of the Fascist regime in Italy, the camp was closed, but some of the remaining Jewish prisoners were deported by German forces to the extermination camp at Auschwitz. Yugoslavia, Greece and Ethiopia requested the extradition of some 1,200 Italian war criminals, who, however, were never brought before an appropriate tribunal because the British government, at the beginning of the Cold War, saw in Pietro Badoglio a guarantor of an anti-communist post-war Italy. In the autumn of 1943, Yugoslav Partisans, led by the Communist Party of Yugoslavia, rescued approximately 2,500 Jews from the island.

== Establishment of the camp ==
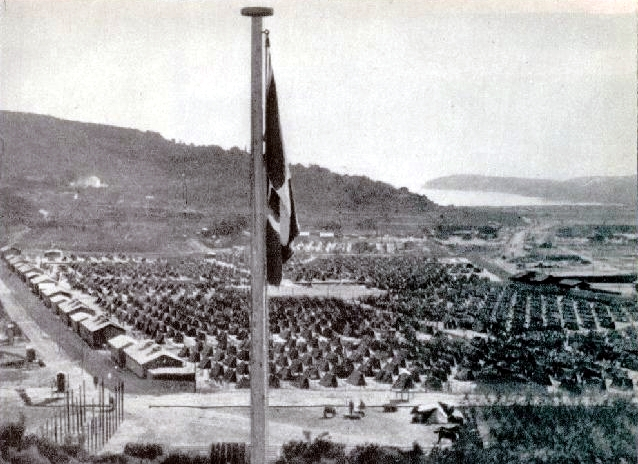
Italian flag over the Rab concentration camp.

Number of Slovene and Croatian inmates
Period / Total / Men / Women / Children -----------------------------------------------------	in hundreds
27–31 July 1942 Total	12.25
Men	10.61
Women	1.11
Children	0.53
1–15 August 1942 Total	50.21
Men	39.92
Women	0.0
Children	10.29
16–31 August 1942 Total	76.18
Men	53.33
Women	10.76
Children	12.09
1–15 September 1942 Total	96.46
Men	67.87
Women	15.63
Children	12.96
16–30 September 1942 Total	105.23
Men	73.27
Women	18.04
Children	13.92
1–15 October 1942 Total	106.33
Men	73.87
Women	18.54
Children	13.92
16–30 October 1942 Total	106.19
Men	72.06
Women	19.91
Children	14.22
1–15 November 1942 Total	107.32
Men	72.07
Women	20.62
Children	14.63
16–27 November 1942 Total	91.33
Men	66.47
Women	15.60
Children	9.26
Source: Davide Rodogno (2003) Il nuovo ordine mediterraneo, Bollati Boringhieri, Turin.

Under Italian army commander Mario Roatta's watch, the ethnic cleansing and violence committed against the Slovene and Croat civilian population easily matched that of the Germans with summary executions, hostage-taking and hostage killing, reprisals, internments (both in Rab and at the Gonars concentration camp), and the burning of houses and villages. Additional special instructions, which included an edict that orders must be "carried out most energetically and without any false compassion", were issued by Roatta:

"(...) if necessary don't shy away from using cruelty. It must be a complete cleansing. We need to intern all the inhabitants and put Italian families in their place."

Roatta in his Circolare No.3 "issued orders to kill hostages, demolish houses and whole villages: his idea was to deport all inhabitants of Slovenia and replace them with Italian settlers" in the Province of Ljubljana, in response to Slovene partisans' resistance in the province.

Following Roatta's orders, one of his soldiers in his July 1, 1942 letter wrote home:

"We have destroyed everything from top to bottom without sparing the innocent. We kill entire families every night, beating them to death or shooting them."

Uroš Roessmann, one of the Rab internees, a student at the time, remembers:

"There were frequent razzias when the train taking us to school in Ljubljana from our village of Polje pulled in to the main station. Italian soldiers picked us all up. Some were released, and others were sent to (Italian) concentration camps. Nobody knew who decided, or on what grounds.

The camp at Rab, built near the village of Kampor, was one of a number of such camps established along the Adriatic coast to accommodate Slovenian and Croatian prisoners. Opened in July 1942, it was officially termed "Camp for the concentration and internment of war civilians - Rab" (Campo di concentramento per internati civili di Guerra – Arbe).

== Inmates and camp conditions ==
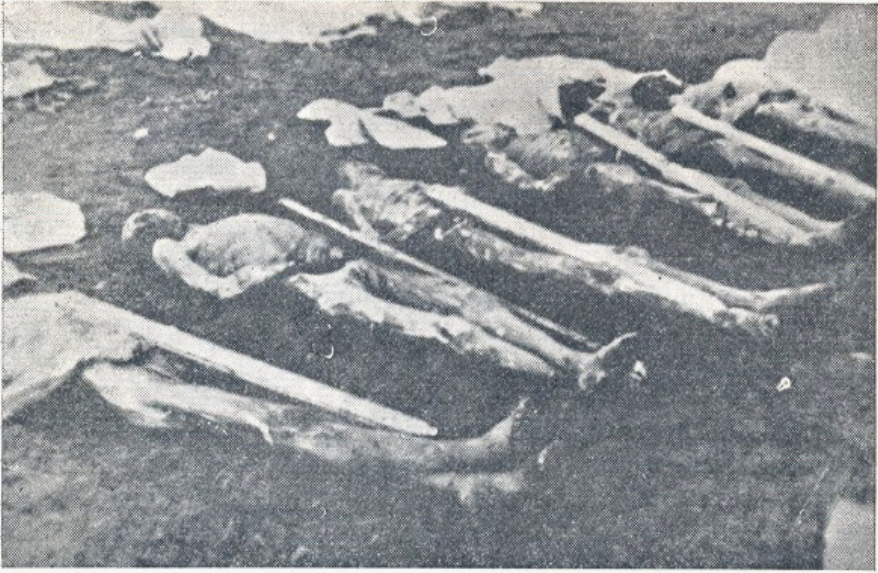
Dead inmates at the Rab concentration camp. Source: Rabski Zbornik, 1953.

Slovenes and Croatians, many of whom were women and children, including pregnant women and newborns, suffered from cold and hunger in open-air tents, surrounded by barbed wire fence and guard towers. At its peak there were up to 15,000 internees.

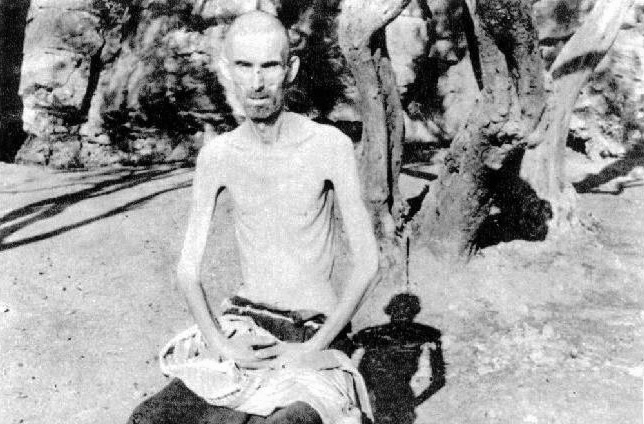
Male inmate at the Rab concentration camp.

Conditions at the camp were described as appalling: "filthy, muddy, overcrowded and swarming with insects". Slovene writer Metod Milač, an inmate at the camp, described in his memoirs how prisoners were quartered six to a tent and slowly starved to death on a daily diet of thin soup, a few grains of rice and small pieces of bread. Prisoners fought with each other for access to the camp's meager water supply, a single barrel, while many became infested with lice and wracked with dysentery caused by the unhygienic conditions. Part of the encampment was washed away by flash flooding.

Some Italian authorities eventually acknowledged that the treatment of the inmates was counterproductive; in January 1943, the commanding officer of the 14th Battalion of Carabinieri complained:

"In the last few days some internees have returned from the concentration camp in such a state of physical emaciation, a few in an absolutely pitiful condition, that a terrible impression has been created in the general population. Treating the Slovene population like this palpably undermines our dignity and is contrary to the principles of justice and humanity to which we make constant reference in our propaganda."

== Jewish prisoners at Rab ==
By 1 July 1943, 2,118 Yugoslav Jews were recorded having been interned by the Italian army. Starting in June 1943, they were moved into a newly constructed section of the Rab concentration camp, alongside the Slovenian and Croatian section. Unlike the Slovene and Croatian prisoners, the Jewish ones were provided with better accommodation, sanitation and services; they were provided with wooden and brick barracks and houses in contrast to the overcrowded tents sheltering the Slavic prisoners.

Historian Franc Potočnik, also an inmate in the Slavic section of the camp, described the much better conditions in the Jewish section:

"The [Slavic] internees in Camp I could watch through the double barriers of barbed wire what took place in the Jewish camp. The Jewish internees were living under conditions of true internment for their 'protection', whereas the Slovenes and Croats were in a regime of 'repression'. . . . They brought a lot of baggage with them. Italian soldiers carried their luggage into little houses of brick destined for them. Almost every family had its own little house.... They were reasonably well dressed; in comparison, of course, to other internees."

The difference in treatment was the consequence of a conscious policy by the Italian military authorities. In July 1943, the Civil Affairs Office at the 2nd Army HQ issued a memorandum on "The Treatment of Jews in the Rab Camp", which was enthusiastically approved by chief of the office and the 2nd Army's chief of staff.

The memorandum's author, a Major Prolo, urged that the infrastructure of the camp must be:

"...comfortable for all internees without risk to the maintenance of order and discipline. Inactivity and boredom are terrible evils which work silently on the individual and collectivity. It is prudent that in the great camp of Rab those concessions made to the Jews of Porto Re [Kraljevica] to make their lives comfortable should not be neglected."

He concluded with a clear reference to Italian awareness of the massacres of Jews that were ongoing elsewhere in German-occupied Europe:

"The Jews (...) have the duties of all civilians interned for protective reasons, and a right to equivalent treatment, but for particular, exceptional political and contingent reasons [emphasis added], it seems opportune to concede, while maintaining discipline unimpaired, a treatment consciously felt to be 'Italian' which they are used to from our military authorities, and with a courtesy which is complete and never half-hearted."

Some members of the Italian military also saw humane treatment of the Jews as a way of preserving Italy's military and political honour in the face of German encroachments on Italian sovereignty; Steinberg describes this as "a kind of national conspiracy [among the Italian military] to frustrate the much greater and more systematic brutality of the Nazi state." According to the Slovenian Rab survivor, Anton Vratuša, who later became Yugoslavia's ambassador to the United Nations: "We were prisoners; they were protected people. We used their assistance."

== Notable WWII-era prisoners ==
- Thea Altaras (1924–2004)
- Mihael Montiljo (1928–2006)
- Maja Bošković-Stulli (1922–2012)
- Alfred Pal (1920–2010)
- Ivan Rein (1905–1943)
- Anton Vratuša (1915–2017)
- Jakob Finci (b. 1943)

== Closure of the camp ==
By mid-1943 the camp's population stood at about 7,400 people, of whom some 2,700 were Jews. The fall of Mussolini in late July 1943 increased the likelihood that the Jews on Rab would fall into German hands, prompting the Italian Foreign Ministry to repeatedly instruct the General Staff that the Jews should not be released unless they themselves requested it. The ministry also began to put in place a mass transfer of the Jews to the Italian mainland. However, on 16 August 1943 the Italian military authorities ordered that the Jews were to be released from the camp, although those that wished could stay.

The island remained in Italian hands until after the Armistice with Italy was signed on 8 September 1943, when the Germans seized control. About 245 of the Jewish inmates of the camp joined the Rab Brigade of the 24th Division of the People's Liberation Army and Partisan Detachments of Yugoslavia, forming the Rab battalion, though they were eventually dispersed among other Partisan units.

Although most of the Jews from the camp were evacuated to Partisan-held territory, 204 (7.5%) of them, the elderly or sick, were left behind and were sent to Auschwitz by the Germans for extermination. Ivan Vranetić was honored as one of the Croatian Righteous among the Nations for helping save the Jews evacuated from Rab in September 1943, one of whom he would later marry and retire to Israel.

== Memories of survivors ==
Survivors of the camp include Anton Vratuša, who went on to be Yugoslavia's ambassador at the United Nations (1967–69) and was Prime Minister of Slovenia (1978–80), Jakob Finci who was born in the camp, was later Bosnia's ambassador, and Elvira Kohn, a Jewish Croatian photo-journalist who described her experiences at the camp in some detail.

== Collective memory repression during the Cold War ==
Although a memorial and cemetery were built at the site of the camp by the Goli Otok prisoners in 1955 based on a design by Edvard Ravnikar, and the site has also been equipped with memorial signs in Croatian, Slovene, English, and Italian, during the Cold War the collective memory was repressed due to British government involvement in non-extradition of Italians accused of war crimes, especially Pietro Badoglio, in order to guarantee an anti-communist postwar Italy.

== Historical revisionism ==
The repression of memory led to historical revisionism in Italy. A photograph of an internee from Rab concentration camp was included in 1963 anthology "Notte sul'Europa" misidentified as a photograph of an internee of a German camp, when in fact the internee was Janez Mihelčič, born 1885 in Babna Gorica, who died at Rab in 1943.

In 2003 the Italian media published Silvio Berlusconi's statement that Benito Mussolini merely "used to send people on vacation".

== See also ==
- Kingdom of Italy
- Gonars concentration camp
- Fascist Legacy

== Sources ==
- Giuseppe Piemontese (1946): Twenty-nine months of Italian occupation of the Province of Ljubljana.
- Effie Pedaliu (2004): Britain and the ‘Hand-Over’ of Italian War Criminals to Yugoslavia, 1945–48, Journal of Contemporary History, Vol. 39, No. 4, 503-529 (JStor.org preview)
- Alessandra Kersevan (2008): Lager italiani. Pulizia etnica e campi di concentramento fascisti per civili jugoslavi 1941-1943. Editore Nutrimenti,
