= Vrbas, Donji Vakuf =

Vrbas
- Village
- Location within Bosnia and Herzegovina
- Coordinates: 44.1597642°N 17.3635376°E
- Country: Bosnia and Herzegovina
- Entity: Federation of Bosnia and Herzegovina
- Canton: Central Bosnia
- Municipality: Donji Vakuf

Area
  - Total: 0.25 sq mi (0.66 km^{2})

Population (2013)
  - Total: 177
  - Density: 690/sq mi (270/km^{2})
- Time zone: UTC+1 (CET)
  - Summer (DST): UTC+2 (CEST)

Vrbas is a village in the municipality of Donji Vakuf, Bosnia and Herzegovina.

== Demographics ==
According to the 2013 census, its population was 177.

Ethnicity in 2013
| Ethnicity | Number | Percentage |
|---|---|---|
| Bosniaks | 169 | 95.5% |
| Serbs | 6 | 3.4% |
| other/undeclared | 2 | 1.1% |
| Total | 177 | 100% |
