= Andrija Poklepović =

Croatian physician and Righteous Among the Nations

- Born: 20 March 1895; Milna, Brač
- Died: 30 October 1959 (aged 64) Zagreb, PR Croatia, FPR Yugoslavia
- Occupation: Physician
- Known for: Rescuing Jews during World War II
- Awards: Righteous Among the Nations (1996)

Andrija Poklepović (20 March 1895 - 30 October 1959) was a Croatian physician specializing in infectious diseases and a military medical officer in Split. During the Second World War he helped protect and treat persecuted individuals, including Jews and members of the resistance. For these actions he was posthumously recognized in 1996 by Yad Vashem as one of the Righteous Among the Nations.

== Early life and education ==
Poklepović was born on 20 March 1895 in Milna on the island of Brač. He attended secondary school in Split and later studied medicine in Zagreb and Vienna. During the First World War, Poklepović served in the Austro-Hungarian Army as a one-year volunteer (Einjährig-Freiwilliger) in the Imperial-Royal Schützen Regiment No. 37. He was recorded as a prisoner of war in Padula, Italy, in an Austro-Hungarian casualty list published on 12 August 1918. He subsequently practised general medicine in several settlements on the island of Brač.

== Medical career ==
In early June 1933, Poklepović was appointed to the infectious diseases pavilion of the State Hospital in Split. On 12 May 1940, he was elected to the governing body of the Medical Chamber of the Banovina of Croatia at its assembly in Split. His clinical work included the diagnosis and treatment of dysenteric syndromes. The Croatian Medical Chamber credits him with introducing rectoscopy as a diagnostic examination in Split. The Croatian Medical Chamber identifies Poklepović as the founder of the infectious diseases department of the VIII Corps military hospital in 1944. He subsequently served as head of the infectious diseases department of the Yugoslav Navy's military medical service, a position he retained until his death in 1959.

== Activities during World War II ==
Poklepović began supporting the National Liberation Movement in 1941. During the Second World War Poklepović assisted members of the Yugoslav resistance and protected persecuted individuals, including Jews and prisoners held by occupying authorities. Testimony held by Yad Vashem states that Poklepović and fellow physician Dr. Mihovil Silobrčić used hospital transfers and medical care to protect detainees from deportation.

== Recognition ==
In 1996 Poklepović was posthumously recognized by Yad Vashem as one of the Righteous Among the Nations for helping rescue Jews during the Holocaust.

== Military decorations ==
For his service in military medicine he received several Yugoslav decorations, including:

- Order of Merit for the People - Third Class
- Order for Military Merit - Third Class

== Death ==
Poklepović died in Zagreb on 30 October 1959, aged 64. At the time of his death, he held the rank of lieutenant colonel (potpukovnik) and was head of the infectious diseases department of the Yugoslav Navy Medical Centre.
