= Aleš Strojnik =

Aleš Strojnik (also known as Alex Strojnik, May 21, 1921 – November 6, 1995) was a Slovenian American aerodynamicist and aircraft designer specializing in low-speed drag reduction. He was also a pioneer and professor in physics and high-energy electron microscopy, and retired from teaching and research at Arizona State University in Tempe, Arizona. His daughter, Marija Strojnik Scholl, took interest in optics at an early age when she was accompanying her father to work, and went on to become a prominent astrophysicist.

Strojnik was born and educated in Ljubljana, Slovenia, Yugoslavia. He was imprisoned at the Gonars concentration camp during World War II along with thousands of other ethnic Slovenes by the Fascist Italian authorities of the Province of Ljubljana. After the war, Strojnik returned to academia and research. He is called by some "the first Slovenian biomedical engineer", and he was influential in cultivating a sense of quality among his students.

Strojnik had some training in, and passion for, aeronautical engineering. His first aircraft design, which he built in Slovenia (then part of Yugoslavia) in 1945, was called the S-1. It was a flying-wing glider. After suffering a fractured skull and broken nose in crashing the S-1, he abandoned the design.

Strojnik's pursuit of quality in science landed him on the wrong side of Slovenian academia, controlled after the war by the Yugoslav Partisans of Josip Broz Tito's postwar Communist government. Strojnik's article "Who Is a Scientist" appeared in the communist publication Nova Obzorja (New Horizon).

That article made [Strojnik] universally resented in the Slovenian academic circles because it exposed the rotten core of the Slovenian academia. It was advisable for Strojnik to look for employment abroad...The result was a visiting appointment for Strojnik at Cornell University in electron microscopy. Later Strojnik became full professor at the Arizona State University in Tempe.

In addition to his academic career, after immigrating to the United States, Strojnik continued the pursuit of his passion for aviation and aircraft design. The Strojnik S-2 self-launching sailplane, the S-4 and S-5 sport planes, and Strojnik's Laminar Aircraft three-volume book series had great impact on light aircraft design. The S-4 "Laminar Magic" set a U.S. national aviation speed record in Fédération Aéronautique Internationale (FAI) Category C-1a/0 (European microlight, under 300 kilograms (660 lb) gross weight) in 1987. Strojnik also wrote a much earlier book entitled Človek je dobil krila ("Man Got His Wings") in Slovene, which was published in 1947.

Strojnik had four sons and a daughter.
