= United States national laboratories =

The term national laboratory may generically refer to any government-operated or -sponsored laboratory. In the United States, laboratories that have "National Laboratory" in their name include:

- United States Department of Energy national laboratories
- Frederick National Laboratory for Cancer Research, sponsored by the National Cancer Institute
- Galveston National Laboratory, sponsored by the National Institute of Allergy and Infectious Diseases
- International Space Station National Laboratory, sponsored by NASA
- Department of Homeland Security Science and Technology Directorate Office of National Laboratories
