= Primošten massacre =

1942 mass murder of Croat civilians

- Location: Primošten
- Date: 16 November 1942
- Target: Croats
- Attack type: Mass murder, reprisals
- Deaths: 80–150
- Perpetrator: Italian army

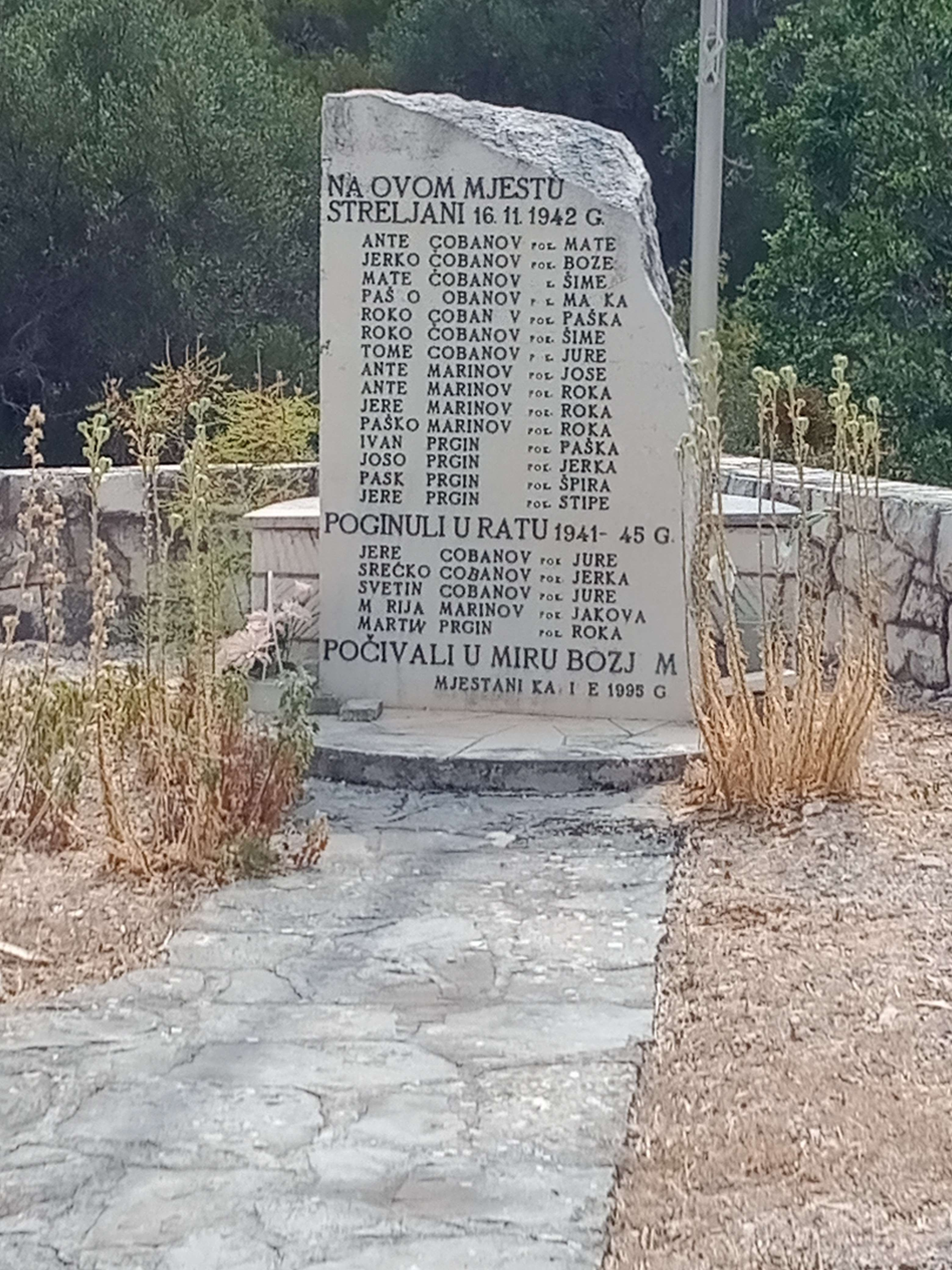
A commemorative stone reminds visitors of the civilian deaths that occurred during the massacre.

The Primošten massacre was the mass murder of Croat civilians by Italian occupation forces on 16 November 1942, in the village of Primošten, in retaliation for an earlier Partisan attack.

== Timeline ==
On 13 November 1942, Partisans ambushed an Italian truck convoy near Primošten, fourteen Italian soldiers were killed, seven were wounded and six were taken prisoner. Three days later, Italian forces ordered reprisals against the civilian population of Primošten.

On 16 November 1942, Italian forces surrounded Primošten and indiscriminately shelled and bombed the village with artillery from land and sea and with three planes. The bombardment lasted for four hours, causing a large number of civilian deaths and injuries and heavily damaged large parts of Primošten.

After the artillery attack, Italian infantry entered the village, shooting or bayoneting a number of male civilians, who were separated from the women and children. The remaining homes were torched and looted, others were booby-trapped with grenades, killing a number of civilians (including children) that tried to later return to their homes.

Around 300 homes were destroyed or damaged during the attack. Nearby villages were also burned and looted, 200 civilians were arrested and were deported to the Vodice concentration camp.

== Aftermath ==
Between 80 and 150 civilians were killed. 150 children were left without one or both of their parents.

In 2007, a mass grave containing the remains of 50 victims of the Primošten massacre were found in the Digova cave, near the village of Široke.

== Books ==
- Tomasevich, Jozo (2001). War and Revolution in Yugoslavia, 1941–1945: Occupation and Collaboration. Stanford: Stanford University Press. ISBN 978-0-8047-7924-1.
