= Ragnhild Hatton =

Norwegian-British historian

- Born: 10 January 1913; Bergen, Norway
- Died: 16 May 1995 (aged 82); London, England
- Occupation: historian
- Writing career
- Genre: European international history
- Subjects: 17th and 18th Century

Ragnhild Marie Hatton (10 January 1913, Bergen, Norway – 16 May 1995, London) was professor of International History at the London School of Economics. As the author of her obituary declared, she was "for a generation Britain's leading historian of 17th- and 18th-century Europe...."

== Early life and education ==
The daughter of Gustav Ingolf Hanssen and Marie Rikheim Hanssen, Ragnhild Hanssen was educated in a private school for girls in Bergen, Norway, and then in the Bergen Cathedral School. She entered the University of Oslo, where she received her candidata magisterii (Cand. Mag.) degree in 1936. On 24 June 1936, she married Harry Hatton (died 1989), an English businessman, who had served in the Royal Navy as well as in merchant ships and later became a mathematics teacher. The couple had two sons.

Moving to London on her marriage, she matriculated as a part-time student at University College, London, where she continued to work on the doctoral thesis that she had begun in Norway. Working with G. J. Renier and Mark A. Thomson, she completed her PhD in 1947 with her thesis on "Diplomatic relations between Great Britain and the Dutch Republic, 1714–1721."

== Academic career ==
While still a graduate student, she became a part-time teacher. She was appointed Assistant Lecturer at the London School of Economics in 1949 and rose to become Lecturer in 1950, and Reader in 1958. In 1968, she was named Professor of International History. She was appointed Professor Emeritus in 1981. She served as Dean of the Faculty of Economics and Political Science, 1974–1978, and Chairperson of the History Department, London School of Economics, 1978–1981.

She served on the London Honours Board of Examiners in History, 1964–68, and was an external examiner in history for the University of Nottingham, 1965–69, the University of Edinburgh, 1965–70, Queens University, Belfast, 1972–73, and the University of Warwick, 1975–77. She served as a member of Council of the Royal Historical Society, 1979–1983.

== Honours ==
- Fellow, Royal Swedish Academy of Letters, History and Antiquities, 1954
- Honorary Foreign Member American Historical Association, 1979
- Honorary Corresponding Member, La Academia Panamanena de la Historia
- Ridder (Knight), First Class, Royal Norwegian Order of St. Olav, 1983
- Honorary Doctor of Humane Letters, Ohio State University, 1985
- Commander of the Order of the Polar Star, 1986
- French Palmes Académiques, 1988
- Senior Fellow, British Academy, 1993

== Published works ==
Books

- Diplomatic relations between Great Britain and the Dutch Republic, 1714–1721. Published for The Anglo-Netherlands Society by East & West Ltd, 1950.
- Captain James Jefferye's letters to the Secretary of state, Whitehall, from the Swedish army, 1707–1709. Edited by Ragnhild Hatton. Historiska handlingar vol. 35:1 (1954).
- William III and Louis XIV: essays 1680–1720 by and for Mark A. Thomson; edited by Ragnhild Hatton and J. S. Bromley; with an introductory memoir by George Clark. Liverpool: Liverpool University Press, 1968.
- Charles XII of Sweden. London: Weidenfeld and Nicolson, 1968.
- Europe in the age of Louis XIV. London: Thames and Hudson, 1969.
- Studies in diplomatic history: essays in memory of David Bayne Horn, edited by Ragnhild Hatton and M. S. Anderson. Harlow: Longmans, 1970.
- A history of European ideas, by Erik Lund, Mogens Pihl, Johannes Sløk; edited with a preface by Ragnhild Hatton; translated from the Danish by W. Glyn Jones. London: Hurst, 1971.
- Louis XIV and his world. London: Thames and Hudson, 1972.
- Charles XII. London: Historical Association, 1974.
- Louis XIV and absolutism, edited by Ragnhild Hatton. London: Macmillan, 1976.
- Louis XIV and Europe, edited by Ragnhild Hatton. London: Macmillan, 1976.
- George I: elector and king. London: Thames and Hudson, 1978.
- The Anglo-Hanoverian connection, 1714–1760: The Creighton Trust Lecture 1982, delivered before the University of London on Monday 15 November 1982. London: University of London, 1982.
- Karl XII av Sverige: [en biografi]. översättning: Claes Gripenberg och John Rumenius. Köping: Lindfors, 1985.

Major Contributions In addition to being a contributor to The New Cambridge Modern History, volumes VI and VII, and to journals, including European Studies Review, Journal of Modern History, and XVII Siecle, she contributed to the following works:

- K. Bourne and D. C. Watt, editors, Studies in International History. Longmans, Green, 1967.
- J. C. Rule, editor, Louis XIV and the Craft of Kingship, Ohio State University Press, 1970.
- Paul Fritz and David Williams, editors, The Triumph of Culture: Eighteenth-Century Perspectives, A. M. Hakkert, 1972
- T. Hunczak, editor, Russian Imperialism from Ivan the Great to the Revolution, New Brunswick: Rutgers University Press, 1974.
- Francoise-Marie Arouet de Voltaire, The History of Charles XII, King of Sweden, translated by Antonia White with an introduction by Ragnhild Hatton. London: Folio, 1976.
- A. G. Dickens, editor, The Courts of Europe: Politics, Patronage and Royalty, 1400–1800, London: Thames & Hudson, 1977.
- Les Relations Franco-Autrichiennes sous Louis XIV, Saint-Cyr-Coetquidan, 1983.

== Sources ==
- Andrew Lossky, "Ragnhild Marie Hatton" in Studies in History and Politics/Etudes d'Histoire et de Politique, edited by Karl W Schweizer and Jeremy BlackSpecial Issue: "Essays in European history in honour of Ragnhild Hatton," vol. IV (1985), pp. 13–17. This issue also contains a bibliography of Ragnhild Hatton's principal published works.
- "Obituary", The [London] Times, 24 May 1995, p. 19.
- John C. Rule, "Ragnhild Hatton," Perspectives: Newsletter of the American Historical Association (1995)
- Robert Oresko, G. C. Gibbs, and H. M. Scott, editors, Royal and Republican Sovereignty in Early Modern Europe: Essays in Memory of Ragnhild Hatton. Cambridge and New York: Cambridge University Press, 1997.
- Matthew Anderson, "Ragnhild Marie Hatton, 1913-1995," Proceedings of the British Academy, vol. 94 (1997), pp. 543–553.
