= Riitta Nikula =

Finnish art historian (born 1944)

Riitta Nikula (born 1944, in Helsinki), is a Finnish art historian, author and professor emeritus in art and architecture history at the University of Helsinki. She obtained her PhD from the University of Helsinki in 1981 with a study of the architecture of the Töölö region of Helsinki. She was Professor of Art History at the University of Helsinki from 1994 to 2007. Nikula also acted as Head of Research at the Museum of Finnish Architecture from 1988 to 1994. Nikula is regarded as a generalist historian of Finnish architecture, with her writings covering a time-span from prehistoric times to the present day. But she also combines two potentially contradictory viewpoints, a feminist viewpoint and a pro-bourgeois viewpoint, highlighting the role of the ruling middle classes in creating aesthetically valuable architecture.

== Select list of publications ==
- Riitta Nikula, Focus on 20th century architecture and town planning. Collected papers by Riitta Nikula. SRM, 2006
- Riitta Nikula, Wood, stone and steel: Contours of Finnish architecture, Otava, 2005
- Riitta Nikula (ed), Heroism and the Everyday. Building Finland in the 1950s, SRM, 1994
- Riitta Nikula, Armas Lindgren 1874-1929 - architect, SRM, 1988.
