= Monigo concentration camp =

Italian concentration camp

- Concentration camp
- Location within Italy
- Coordinates: 45.6816°N 12.2078°E
- Location: Monigo
- Operated by: Italy
- Original use: Military barracks
- Operational: July 1942
- Inmates: Civilian, military
- Number of inmates: 10,000 total
- Killed: from 187 to 225

The Monigo concentration camp was a prison camp opened during World War II aimed at civilian prisoners (mostly Slovenes and Croats). It was located in Monigo, a suburb of the town of Treviso. The camp was active between 1942 and 1943. The total number of inmates is not certain, but is estimated in a total of around 10,000, with an average number of 2,582 prisoners at a time (maximum 3,374). The camp often surpassed its full capacity of 2,400 (as stated by Italian military authorities).

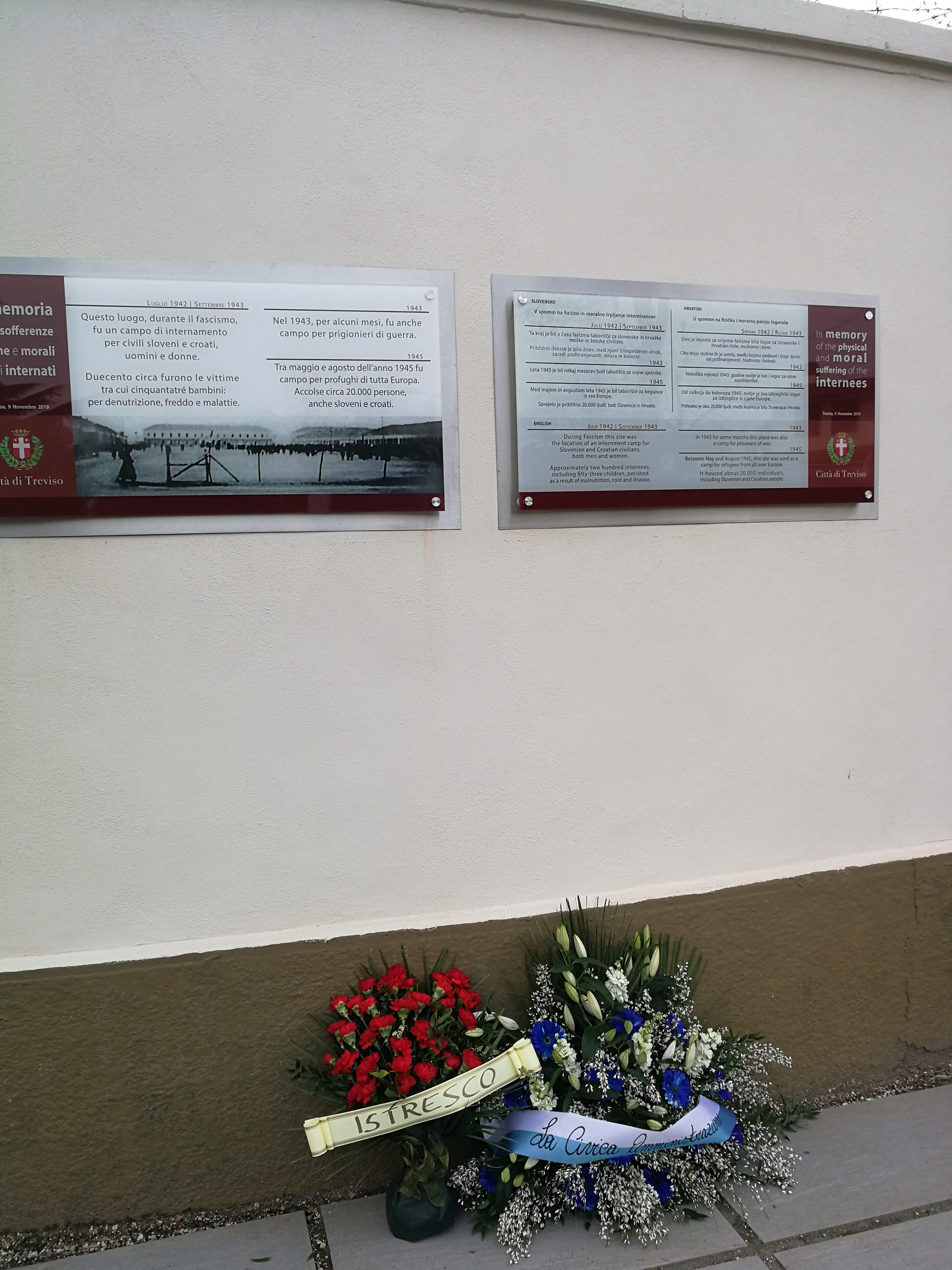
Memorial plaque on the outer walls of the former camp

== Structure and use ==
The camp was located inside the "Cadorin" military base, just north-west of Treviso. The inmates occupied five brick barracks, with an additional one reserved to guards and soldiers. In addition to the prisoner accommodations, two small rooms were used for the bathrooms and the canteen, and a seventh cabin served as a kitchen and hosted the command. The camp opened on July 1, 1942. Initially, the camp was populated by Slovenian prisoners, followed in autumn by Croatian individuals (most of them from Rab concentration camp). Due to its relatively small size and the cold weather of early 1943, diseases such as tuberculosis spread through the inmate population. Starting from March 1943, POWs from South Africa and New Zealand (around 500 and 100 respectively) were also assigned to Monigo in a subsection called camp 103. Prisoners came from a transit camp in Benghazi, after being captured during the Fall of Tobruk.

The camp remained active until the Armistice of Cassabile between the Kingdom of Italy and the Allies on September 8, 1943. The German Army assumed control of the camp soon after, remaining until the end of the War in May 1945. Afterwards, the camp served for a brief period of time as a DP camp and was later reinstated to its original military use.

== The camp under Italian administration ==
New prisoners were subjected to a "bonifica", that included shower and clothes disinfection. No uniform was provided (differently from German-managed lagers) and prisoners initially only used their personal summer clothing (even during colder seasons). Inmates were given three blankets, a spoon, a tin and a bit of straw. Bunk beds were placed on each wall, where inmates slept in pairs. No forced labour was theoretically imposed; however, drawings made by Slovenian interned Vladimir Lamut show maintenance activities were required.

Prisoners were organized following the "Circolare 3C" (Memo 3C) by General Mario Roatta, distinguishing "repressivi" (to repress, partisans) from "protettivi" (to be protected, usually target of Slavic partisans repercussions). In practice, limited resources and frequent influx of new prisoners prevented this separation, causing cohabitation issues. Inmates were subject to strict discipline, and invasive inspections were frequent. Violence was not systematically practiced; however, the Carabinieri camp commander tenente colonnello Alfredo Anceschi was known for his strictness. Prisoners recalled the episode of a woman tied in the middle of the camp's grounds for an entire day.

Living conditions were bad from the start, since dorms had no heating and diet included as low as 911 calories per day. Prisoners were fed with a cup of tea in the morning and later with a loaf of bread. At lunch prisoners were given rice and during the late afternoon, a slice of cheese. Around the end of 1942, only a few months after the camp's opening, inflation further lowered the available budget. In addition to this, guards used to steal supplies in order to resell them in the rampant black market. In November 1942, there were 3,122 prisoners in Monigo: 1,058 men, 1,085 women and 466 children including 42 infants. With the arrival of winter, food supplies dwindles and disease decimated the weakest. Professor Menemio Bortolozzi, pathologist at Treviso hospital, noted the widespread presence of tuberculosis, pneumonia, scabies, muscular atrophy and dysentery. "They were not normal corpses," he declared to the press later, "they looked like mummies or exhumed bodies". In particular, women and children from Rab suffered the most.

Camp casualties were reported by different lists, averaging around 200 (187, 192 and 225). 53 children under 10 years of age died; infant mortality rate was about 300 per thousand.

Despite the difficult living conditions, Slovenian prisoners organized a choir, chess tournaments and even the publication of a newspaper, Novice izza žice (news from behind the barbed wire).

== The camp under German administration ==
Just after the Armistice was declared, Italian personnel was in a state of complete disarray due to lack of clear orders. Soldiers were either captured by the Germans and deported as POW out of Italy, enlisted in the new Republican Army or forced into joining other German units. Those who successfully fled their posts either went back home or joined partisan formations. The Monigo barracks were left without guards: civilian prisoners, POW of Camp 103 and Italian soldiers left the camp. There is no clear indication of the fate of the majority of the prisoners after September 1943, or Monigo's immediate use. Around the end of 1943, German units seized the camp and installed a driving school for Italian Republican military forces, together with a small garrison of Organisation Todt members.

During the night between 5 and 6 December 1943 the great sweep up of the Jews of Venice took place, but there is no indication of Jews in the camp. However, due to the close vicinity of the camp from Venice (40 km) this cannot be excluded, as captured individuals could have stationed there before being transferred to German extermination camps in Germany and Poland.

== Use as a DP camp and termination ==
After the end of the war and the deportation of the remaining German/Italian personnel, the whole structure briefly became a camp for Displaced Persons, administered by the Allied Military Government. From late May 1942 to August 1945, around 20,000 individuals passed through the camp: 8,000 Poles, 4,700 French, 2,000 slavs and a large number of Italian POWs returning from Germany.

After the termination of all DP activities, the barracks returned to exercise their usual military function. Today they stand at the disposal of the Italian Army, housing the 33rd EW Regiment.

== Memorial ==
On November 9, 2019, a civil ceremony was held in memory of the deportees and the refugees of the camp. The ceremony included the unveiling of two memorial plaques, affixed on its boundary walls right next to the military base gates. During the event, civil and religious authorities from Italy, Croatia and Slovenia highlighted the importance of tolerance, human dignity and international cooperation.

== See also ==
- Holocaust in Italy

== Sources ==
- Belco, Victoria (2010). War Massacre and Recovery in Central Italy, 1943-1948 (Toronto Italian Studies). Toronto: University of Toronto Press. ISBN 0-8020-9314-0
- Gombač, Metka. "I bambini sloveni nei campi di concentramento italiani (1942-1943)". DEP: 49–63. Retrieved 18 September 2012
- Marcus Ferrar; John Corsellis (2005). Slovenia, 1945 : Memories of Death and Survival after World War II. London: I. B. Tauris. ISBN 1-85043-840-4.
- This article was initially translated from the Italian Wikipedia.
