= Aira Kemiläinen =

Finnish historian (1919–2006)

- Born: 4 August 1919; Kuopio, Finland
- Died: 10 July 2006 (aged 86); Vesanto, Finland
- Education: Ph.D.
- Occupation: Historian
- Employer(s): University of Helsinki; University of Jyväskylä
- Title: Professor

Aira Tellervo Kemiläinen (4 August 1919 in Kuopio – 10 July 2006 in Vesanto) was a Finnish historian who received her Ph.D. in 1957. In the 1950s and 1960s, Kemiläinen taught history at a number of different schools in Helsinki. In 1961, she became associate professor at University of Helsinki, and became professor at University of Jyväskylä as well in 1971. She retired in 1986.

Aira Kemiläinen was for the most part engaged in the study of European history of ideas, which resulted in books like Auffassung über die Sendung des deutschen Volkes (1956) and Nationalism (1966). Her other works include Suomalaiset, outo Pohjolan kansa (1993), which discusses theories about the Finns and their national identity, and Finns in the shadows of the 'Aryans' (1998).

== Selected publications ==
- Aira, Kemiläinen (1971). "L'Affaire d'Avignon" (1789–1791) From the Viewpoint of Nationalism. Helsinki: Suomalainen Tiedeakatemia.
- Aira, Kemiläinen (1964). Nationalism: Problems concerning the word, the concept and classification. Jyväskylä: Jyväskylän Kasvatusopillinen Korkeakoulu.
