= Effie Pedaliu =

Historian

- Education: London School of Economics
- Scientific career
- Fields: International history
- Workplaces: LSE IDEAS
- Thesis: Britain, Italy and the early Cold War: Aspects of British foreign policy towards Italy, 1946-1949 (1999)

Effie G. H. Pedaliu was an international historian, author and Visiting Fellow at LSE IDEAS. She has held posts at LSE, KCL and UWE. She is the author of Britain, Italy and the Origins of the Cold War, (Palgrave/Macmillan, 2003; pbk. edition 2017), the co-editor (with J.W. Young and M.D. Kandiah) of Britain in Global Affairs, Volume II, From Churchill to Blair, (Palgrave/Macmillan, 2013; pbk. edition 2017) and (with J. Fisher and R. Smith) The Foreign Office, Commerce and British Foreign Policy in the 20th Century (Palgrave/Macmillan, 2017).

Pedaliu co-edits with Professor John W. Young the Palgrave/Macmillan book series, Security Conflict and Cooperation in the Contemporary World. She is a member of the peer review college of the Arts and Humanities Research Council and a co-convenor of the International History Seminar at the Institute of Historical Research (University of London). She has written numerous articles for academic journals, book chapters, policy reports, feature articles, op-eds and contributes regularly to the Greek broadsheet Kathimerini on Sunday.

The main themes of her work include: the international history of the Cold War; American and British foreign policy; European integration; transatlantic relations; Southern Europe; Human Rights; and Mediterranean security.

== Education ==
MA and PhD in International History, London School of Economics. Her doctoral thesis, dated 1999, was titled Britain, Italy and the early Cold War: Aspects of British foreign policy towards Italy, 1946-1949.

== Teaching ==
- 1990 to 1994: lecturer in International History, London School of Economics and Political Science.
- 1995 to 1997: Jean Monnet Fellow in European History, Luton University.
- 1997 to 2002, lecturer in International History, King's College London.
- 2003 to 2012, senior lecturer in International History, University of the West of England.
- 2012 to date, visiting fellow, LSE IDEAS.

== Consultancy work ==
Pedaliu helped in the organisation and declassification of important documents held by the Greek Foreign Ministry which throw new light on the origins of the Cold War. These were compiled and published in the three volume Greece at the Cutting Edge of a New World series: The Cold War, The Truman Doctrine, The Marshall Plan, published in Documents of the Greek Foreign Ministry, 1943–51, Vols. 1–3, Kastaniotis, Athens, March 2002.

== Media appearances ==
Pedaliu has commented on CNN on many occasions on issues pertaining to Greece, Italy, the Balkans, and the EU. She has also given interviews and advice to Canadian News, Sky News, the Nikkei Financial Times and Gazeta Wyborcza on the above issues.

== Scholarly publications ==
=== Books ===
2003 Effie G.H.Pedaliu, Britain, Italy and the Origins of the Cold War, Houndmills, London: Palgrave/Macmillan,

2013 John W. Young, Effie G.H. Pedaliu, Michael D. Kandiah, Britain in Global Politics From Churchill to Blair, Volume II, London, Palgrave/Macmillan,

2017 John Fisher, Effie G. H. Pedaliu, and Richard Smith, (eds) The Foreign Office, Commerce and British Foreign Policy in the Twentieth Century. London: Palgrave,

== See also ==
- Fascist Legacy

== Sources ==
- http://www.lse.ac.uk/IDEAS/people/bios/Pedaliu_Effie.aspx
- https://www.palgrave.com/gp/series/14489
- https://www.researchgate.net/profile/Effie_Pedaliu
