= Nicola Bellomo (general) =

Italian general

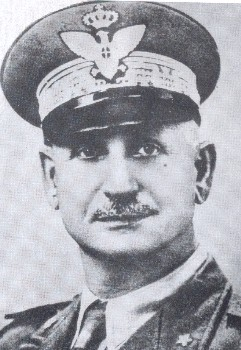
Nicola Bellomo

Nicola Bellomo (2 February 1881 in Bari, Apulia, Italy – 11 September 1945 on the island of Nisida, Naples, Italy) was a general in the Italian Army during World War II. He was tried for war crimes by a British military court for the murder of a British prisoner of war. Bellomo was found guilty and sentenced to death by firing squad. He was one of the few Italian commissioned officers prosecuted for war crimes during World War II, and the only one to be executed by a British-controlled court.

== Career ==
=== Military service ===
Bellomo was a career officer in the Italian Army from the regular class of the Italian Military Academy of Modena. At the outbreak of World War I, he held the rank of Artillery Captain, and during that war, he was awarded his first Italian Silver Medal of Military Valor for gallantry in action. He gave up active duty in 1936, but was reactivated in 1941, when he was assigned as commander of the XII MVSN Zone and Bari province.

=== Shooting of prisoners ===
On 30 November 1941, two British prisoners of war, Captain George Playne of the Royal Armoured Corps and Lieutenant Roy Cooke, escaped from Torre Tresca POW detention camp but were recaptured a few hours later. According to the results of the Italian Army investigation board, Bellomo was already waiting for them when they arrived back at the camp. He wanted to personally investigate the course of events leading to their escape, and asked the two British officers to show him the location from which they had launched their plan. Again, the two British prisoners took their chances to escape, although this time, Italian sentries opened fire, killing Captain Playne and wounding Lieutenant Cooke. The investigation into the incident revealed no misconduct on Bellomo's part.

=== 1943 armistice ===
On 9 September 1943, a day after the Armistice between Italy and Allied armed forces, Bellomo formed a makeshift Italian force to counterattack German forces that tried to occupy the port of Bari. Bellomo was wounded, but the action was successful; the Italians forced the Germans to retreat, leaving the port facilities intact. This allowed the safe and undisturbed landing of British troops on 22 September 1943 under Italian Army protection. A British force quickly moved north to Foggia, which they took on 27 September. By the end of the month, the entire Apulia region and most of southern Italy had been secured by Allied forces. Winston Churchill said, "September was a handful month for Allied armies." In the meantime, Bellomo kept his position as commander of the XII MVSN Zone in Bari.

Shortly afterwards, he was detained and arrested by the British military authority and charged with murder and attempted murder for his actions in the shooting of the two British POWs.

== War crimes trial ==
On 28 January 1944, Bellomo was placed under arrest by the British Military Police and charged with "shooting or ordering to shoot two British officers, causing the death of one of them and the wounding of the other one". Lieutenant Cooke, the surviving prisoner, filed a report against Bellomo on 5 June 1945. In the following weeks, Bellomo was moved around several Allied POW camps, namely in Grumo Appula, Padula, and Afragola. On 14 July 1945, Bellomo received formal communication of his trial. The trial took place on 28 July 1945, and within an hour, he was sentenced to death. Bellomo, who refused to ask for a pardon, was executed by a firing squad on the island of Nisida north of Naples on 11 September 1945. At the time, the island was occupied by the British, who used it as a prison facility.

His execution has been the cause of some controversy in Italy; some have claimed that Bellomo's trial was based on insufficient evidence and contradictory statements, and therefore, the sentence and the execution were unfair. Others believe that the British court was influenced by "many Bellomo's Italian foes, e.g.: the Italian Army that almost everywhere collapsed, instead Bellomo successfully defended the Bari Harbour against the German Forces, the Italian anti-fascist front marginalised by a general too close to the Crown, and of course the nostalgics of fascism. At least these forces totally isolated the general during the trial."

== Posthumous award ==
In 1951, the new Italian Government posthumously awarded Bellomo his second Italian Silver Medal of Military Valor for his role in the defence of the seaport of Bari.

== Honors and awards ==
Knight of the Military Order of Savoy
Silver Medal of Military Valor – awarded twice
War Merit Cross

== Bibliography ==
- Piscitelli, Enzo (1948). "BELLOMO, Nicola". Enciclopedia Italiana. II Appendice. Rome: Istituto dell'Enciclopedia Italiana.
- Churchill, Winston (1951). The second World War. Vol. 5: “Closing the ring”. Houghton Mifflin Harcourt.
- Tompkins, Peter (1966). Italy Betrayed. New York: Simon & Schuster.
