= List of historians by area of study =

This is a list of historians categorized by their area of study. See also List of historians and List of women historians by area of study.

== By time period ==
=== Ancient history ===
- Sedat Alp (1913, Veroia, The Ottoman Empire – 2006, Ankara, Turkey) Hittitolog- Historian, Ancient Anatolian
- Ekrem Akurgal (1911, Haifa, The Ottoman Empire- 2002, İzmir, Turkey) archaeologist – historian, Ancient Anatolian
- Leonie Archer (born 1955) – Graeco-Roman Palestine
- Mary Beard (born 1955)
- Sandra Boehringer (born 1972) – the history of sexuality, women and gender in classical Greece
- Anatoly Bokschanin (1903–1979) – Roman history
- Fernand Braudel (1902, Luméville-en-Ornois, France – 1985, Cluses, France ) Roman history
- Thomas Robert Shannon Broughton (1900–1993) – Roman history and prosopography
- Halet Çambel (1916, Berlin, Germany – 2014, İstanbul, Turkey) Archaeologist- historian, ancient Anatolian
- Michael Crawford (born 1939)
- Roland Étienne (born 1944, French) – Ancient Greece and Hellenistic period
- Moses Finley (1912–1986)
- Edward Gibbon (1737–1794) – The History of the Decline and Fall of the Roman Empire
- Adrian Goldsworthy (born 1969, British) – Roman history
- Peter Green (1924–2024) – Ancient Greece and Macedon
- Herodotus
- Keith Hopkins (1934–2004) – Roman history
- Muazzez İlmiye Çığ (1914–2024, Bursa-Turkey) Sumerologist, Sumerian history
- Josephus
- Yuliya Kolosovskaya (1920–2002) – Roman history and Roman provinces of the Danube
- Sergey Kovalev (1886–1960) – Hellenistic and Roman period
- Mikhail Kublanov (1914–1998)
- Barbara Levick (1931–2023) – Roman emperors
- Livy
- Ramsay MacMullen (1928–2022) – History of Rome
- Nikolai Mashkin (1900–1950) – Roman history
- Fergus Millar (1935–2019)
- Theodor Mommsen (1817–1903) History of Rome
- Barthold Georg Niebuhr (1776–1831) – Roman history
- Orosius
- Tahsin Özgüç (1916, Kardzhali, The Ottoman Empire – 2005, Ankara, Turkey) archaeologist – historian, Ancient Anatolian
- Edward Togo Salmon (1905–1988) – Roman history
- Howard Hayes Scullard (1903–1983) – Roman civilization
- Mariya Sergeyenko (1891–1987) – Roman agriculture and daily life
- Ram Sharan Sharma (1919–2011) – Ancient India
- Elena Shtaerman (1914–1991) – Roman history
- Suetonius
- Ronald Syme (1903–1989) – Classical period
- Tacitus
- Joseph Tainter (born 1949)
- Lily Ross Taylor (1886–1969) – Roman history
- Thucydides
- Andrew Wallace-Hadrill (born 1951)
- Max Weber (1864–1920)
- Xenophon
- Polybius

=== Medieval history ===
- John Van Antwerp Fine Jr. (1939–2026) – American medievalist specialized in the history of Central and Southeastern Europe, and Balkans
- Ram Sharan Sharma (1919–2011) – early medieval History of India
- Hakim Syed Zillur Rahman (born 1940) – historian of medieval medicine
- Placido Puccinelli (1609–1685, Italian) – Northern Italy in the 10th century and the Florentine church
- Marc Bloch (1886–1944, French) – Medieval France
- Uta-Renate Blumenthal (1935–2025, American) – Investiture Controversy and Pope Gregory VII.
- John Boswell (1947–1994, American) – Homosexuality in the Middle Ages
- Norman Cantor (1929–2004)
- Georges Duby (1924–1996, French) – Specialized in the history of France between the Capets and the Valois
- Johannes Fried (1942–2026, German)
- François-Louis Ganshof (1895–1980, Belgian) – wrote on early medieval institutional history and feudalism
- Geoffrey of Monmouth – Cleric and writer
- Giraldus Cambrensis
- Edward Grant (1926–2020) – European science in the Middle Ages
- Mary Dormer Harris (1867–1936, English) – medieval history of Coventry
- Johan Huizinga (1872–1945, Dutch) – cultural history, wrote Waning of the Middle Ages
- Jacques Le Goff (1924–2014, French) – Middle Ages, particularly the 12th and 13th centuries
- Suzannah Lipscomb (born 1978, English) – 16th century England and France
- Rev. F. X. Martin (1922–2000, Irish) – Mediævalist and campaigner
- Rosamond McKitterick (born 1949) – Frankish and Carolingian history
- Elizabeth Norton (English) – the House of Tudor
- Henri Pirenne (1862–1935) – the "Pirenne Thesis" of early Medieval development
- Eileen Power (1889–1940) – Middle Ages
- Miri Rubin (born 1956) – social and religious history, 1100–1500
- Steven Runciman (1903–2000) – the Crusades
- Richard Southern (1912–2001)
- Sidney Painter (1902–1960)
- John Julius Norwich (1929–2018)
- John V. Tolan (born 1959)
- Chris Wickham (born 1950)
- Retha Warnicke (born 1939)
- Aaron Gurevich (1924–2006)
- Jerome Lee Shneidman (1929–2008) – psychohistory
- Michael Prestwich (born 1943)
- Alessandro Barbero (born 1959)
- Dick Harrison (born 1966)
- Satish Chandra (1922–2017)
- Irfan Habib (born 1931)
- Michel Kaplan (born 1946, French) – Byzantinist
- Gina Fasoli (1905–1992) – medieval cities, feudal society, and Lombardy
- Rachel Reid (1876–1952) – Tudor history, Medieval Scotland
- Hélène Antoniadis-Bibicou (1923–2017) – Byzantine and Balkan history

== By nation or geographical area ==
=== North America ===
==== History of Canada ====
- Donald Creighton (1902–1979) – Developed the Laurentian thesis
- William J. Eccles (1917–1998) – History of New France
- Lionel Groulx (1878–1967) – The history of Quebec in particular and French North America in general
- Harold Innis (1894–1952) – Economic historian of Canada
- Jack Granatstein (born 1939) – Political and Military historian of Canada
- W.L. Morton (1908–1980) – Expert on western Canada

See also List of Canadian historians.

==== History of the Caribbean ====
- Kamau Brathwaite (1930–2020)
- Aviva Chomsky (born 1957)
- C. L. R. James (1901–1989)
- Lucille M. Mair (1924–2009)
- Walter Rodney (1942–1980)
- Eric Williams (1911–1981) – Focused on slavery and the slave trade, condemned imperialism
- Betty Wood (1945–2021)

==== History of the United States ====
- Henry Adams (1838–1918) – history of the United States in the presidential administrations of Thomas Jefferson and James Madison
- Stephen Ambrose (1936–2002) – biographer of Presidents Dwight D. Eisenhower and Richard M. Nixon
- Edward L. Ayers (born 1953) – U.S. South, founder of the Institute for Advanced Technology in the Humanities (IATH) and Digital Scholarship Lab
- George Bancroft (1800–1891) – wrote first large-scale history of the US
- Charles A. Beard (1874–1948) – revisionist history of Founding Fathers suggesting monetary motivations
- Samuel Flagg Bemis (1891–1973) – U.S. foreign policy; won two Pulitzer Prizes
- Ira Berlin (1941–2018) – slavery
- William Brandon (1914–2002) – historian of the American West and Native Americans.
- Holly Brewer (born 1964) – early American History
- Alan Brinkley (1949–2019) – historian of the Great Depression
- David H. Burton – U.S. historian and biographer of presidents Theodore Roosevelt and William Howard Taft as well as Clara Barton and Oliver Wendell Holmes Jr.
- Bruce Catton (1899–1978) – American Civil War
- William Cronon (born 1954) – American environmental history, the frontier in New England, and the American West
- J. Frank Dobie (1888–1964) – historian of Texas and the Southwestern United States
- David Herbert Donald (1920–2009)
- W. E. B. Du Bois (1868–1963) – historian of the Reconstruction
- Drew Gilpin Faust (born 1947) – Civil War, culture of death, and the Confederacy
- Robert H. Ferrell (1921–2018) – Harry S. Truman, the 20th-century U.S. presidency, World War I
- Eric Foner (born 1943) – Civil War and Reconstruction
- John Hope Franklin (1915–2009) – historian of African Americans
- John A. Garraty (1920–2007) – biography
- Elizabeth Fox-Genovese (1941–2007) – Southern slavery, women's history
- Doris Kearns Goodwin (born 1943) – U.S. presidents, won a Pulitzer Prize in 1995 for No Ordinary Time: Franklin and Eleanor Roosevelt: The Home Front in World War II
- Richard Hofstadter (1916–1970) – Progressivism and U.S. political history
- Daniel Walker Howe – political and intellectual history of the early republic and antebellum period
- Peter Iverson – 20th-century U.S. West/Native American history (emphasis in Navajo history)
- Paul Johnson (1928–2023) – author of A History of the American People and a biographer of George Washington
- Winthrop Jordan (1931–2007) – African-American history
- Willard L. King (1893–1981) – biography and law
- David Lavender (1910–2003) – Western United States
- David McCullough (1933–2022) – general study, most notable work is recent biography of John Adams
- James M. McPherson (born 1936) – American Civil War
- Pauline Maier (1938–2013) – late Colonial, Revolution, Constitution
- D. W. Meinig (1924–2020) – geographic history of America
- Philip D. Morgan (born 1949) – slavery
- David Nasaw (born 1945) – biography and U.S. cultural history
- Francis Parkman (1823–1893) – historian of the French and Indian War
- William B. Pickett (born 1940)
- David Pietrusza (born 1949) – 20th-century presidential elections; biography
- Dominic Sandbrook (born 1974) – political history of the 1960s and 1970s
- Arthur Schlesinger Sr. (1888–1965)
- Arthur Schlesinger Jr. (1917–2007)
- Cornelius Cole Smith, Jr. (1913–2004) – historian of Arizona, California and the Southwestern United States
- Jean Edward Smith (1932–2019) – biography, foreign policy, political economy, constitutional law, legal history, and politics
- Irma Tam Soong (1912–2001) – history of Chinese immigration in Hawaii
- Frederick Jackson Turner (1861–1932) – developed the Frontier Thesis
- Frank Vandiver (1925–2005)
- Woodrow Wilson (1856–1924) – pre-Colonial America to the early 20th century
- Alexander Scott Withers (1792–1865) – primary accounts of colonial western Virginia conflicts
- Sean Wilentz (born 1951) – political, social, and cultural history
- Betty Wood (1945–2021) – early American history
- Gordon S. Wood (1933–2026) – American Revolution
- C. Vann Woodward (1908–1999) – Southern United States
- Howard Zinn (1922–2010) – political scientist and historian of the United States, known for A People's History of the United States
- Nathan Raab (born 1978) – American Civil War and presidential documents, known for The Hunt for History

=== Latin America ===
==== History of Latin America ====
See also Category:Historians of Latin America

- Jeremy Adelman (born 1960)
- Marc Becker
- David Brading (1936–2024)
- Aviva Chomsky (born 1957)
- James Dunkerley (born 1953)
- Mark Falcoff (born 1941)
- Ann Farnsworth-Alvear
- Charles Gibson (born 1943)
- Mike Gonzalez (born 1943)
- Clarence H. Haring (1885–1960)
- Daniel James (born 1948)
- Kenneth Maxwell (born 1941)
- William H. Prescott (1796–1859)
- Peter Winn
- John Wirth (1936–2002)
- John Womack (born 1937)
- Leslie Bethell (born 1937)

==== Brazil ====
- Boris Fausto (1930–2023)
- Lilia Moritz Schwarcz (born 1957)

==== Chile ====
- Alonso de Góngora Marmolejo (1523–1575)
- Pedro Mariño de Lobera (1528–1594)
- Vicente Carvallo y Goyeneche (1742–1816)

==== Peru ====
- Jorge Basadre (1903–1980)
- Raúl Porras Barrenechea (1897–1960)
- María Rostworowski (1915–2016)

=== Europe ===
==== History of Europe ====
- Patricia Clavin (born 1964) – international relations and transnational relations
- Norman Davies (born 1939) – Europe as a whole
- Tony Judt (1948–2010) – post 1945
- Elizabeth Eisenstein (1923–2016) – early printing and transitions in media
- Julia P. Gelardi – royal history of 19th and 20th centuries
- John Lukacs (1924–2019) – Cold War
- Henri-Jean Martin (1924–2007) – early printing and writing
- Effie Pedaliu – history of Italian war crimes and Cold War
- Henri Pirenne (1862–1935) – Belgium
- Walter Alison Phillips (1864–1950)
- Andrew Roberts (born 1963) – Second World War
- John Roberts (1928–2003) – Europe
- J. Salwyn Schapiro (1879–1973)
- Norman Stone (1941–2019)
- Charlotte Zeepvat – royal history of 19th and 20th centuries

==== History of Albania ====
- Stavro Skëndi (1905–1989)

==== History of Belgium ====
- Henri Pirenne (1862–1935) – Middle Ages
- Sophie de Schaepdrijver (born 1961) – World War I
- Herman Van der Wee (born 1928) – social and economic history

==== History of Bosnia and Herzegovina ====
- İbrahim Peçevi (1572–1650)
- Antun Knežević (1834–1889)
- Bono Benić (1708–1785)
- Hamdija Kreševljaković (1888–1959)
- Smail Balić (1920–2002)
- Enver Redžić (1915–2009)
- Marko Vego (1907–1985) – medievalist & archaeologists
- Mustafa Imamović (1941–2017)
- Salmedin Mesihović (born 1975) – medievalist & archaeologists

==== History of England ====
- Donald Adamson (1939–2024) – British
- Robert C. Allen (born 1947) – British economic
- Perry Anderson (born 1938) – British; European history
- Leonie Archer (born 1955) – British
- Karen Armstrong (born 1944) – religious
- Gerald Aylmer (1926–2000) – British; administrative history
- Bernard Bailyn (1922–2020) – Atlantic migration
- Onyeka – Black Britons
- The Venerable Bede (672–735) – Britain from 55 BC to 731 AD
- Brian Bond (1936–2025) – military
- Asa Briggs (1921–2016) – British social.
- Herbert Butterfield (1900–1979) – historiography
- Angus Calder (1942–2008) – Second World War
- David Cannadine (born 1950) – Modern Britain, British business and philanthropy
- J.C.D. Clark (born 1951) – 18th century
- Linda Colley (born 1949) – 18th century
- Patrick Collinson (1929–2011) – Elizabethan England & Puritanism
- Maurice Cowling (1926–2005) – 19th and 20th century politics
- John Darwin (born 1948) – British Empire
- John Davies (1938–2015) - Wales
- Susan Doran – Elizabethan
- Jennifer Kewley Draskau – Manx history, Tudor history
- Eamon Duffy (born 1947) – religious history of the 15th–17th centuries
- Harold James Dyos (1921–1978) – urban
- Geoffrey Rudolph Elton (1921–1994) – Tudor period
- Charles Harding Firth (1857–1936) – political history of the 17th century
- Antonia Fraser (born 1932) – 17th century
- William Gibson (born 1959) – ecclesiastical history
- Samuel Rawson Gardiner (1829–1902) – political history of the 17th century
- Ruth Goodman (born 1963) – early modern
- Andrew Gordon (born 1951) – naval
- Geoffrey of Monmouth (died c. 1154) – England
- Élie Halévy (1870–1937) - British 19th century
- Mary Dormer Harris (1867–1936) - medievalist, local history of Coventry
- Edward Hasted (1732–1812) – Kent
- Max Hastings (born 1945) – military, Second World War
- J. H. Hexter (1910–1996) – England in the 17th century
- Christopher Hill (1912–2003) – England in the 17th century
- Gertrude Himmelfarb (1922–2019) – social and cultural history of the Victorian period
- Eric Hobsbawn (1917–2012) – Marxist British history
- David Hume (1711–1776) – Scottish Enlightenment philosopher and author of the six volume History of England (originally History of Britain)
- Edward Hyde, 1st Earl of Clarendon (1609–1674) – English Civil Wars
- John Edward Lloyd (1861–1947) – early Welsh history
- Thomas Babington Macaulay, 1st Baron Macaulay (1800–1859) – English writer and historian whose most famous work was The History of England from the Accession of James the Second
- Edgar J. March (1897–1971) History of English (and Welsh and Scottish) working sailing craft and associated culture
- John Morrill (born 1946) Seventeenth-century political and military history
- Lewis Bernstein Namier (1888–1960) – political history of the 18th century
- Kenneth Morgan (born 1934) – modern Wales
- Steven Pincus – 17th and 18th century England
- Andrew Roberts (born 1963) – Political biographies, 19th and 20th centuries
- A. L. Rowse (1903–1997) – Cornish history and Elizabethan England
- Dominic Sandbrook (born 1974) – Britain in the 1960s and after
- John Robert Seeley (1834–1895) – British political history of the modern period
- Jack Simmons (1915–2000) – railways, topography
- Paul Slack (born 1943) – Early Modern British Social history
- David Spring (1918–2004) - British 19th century
- David Starkey (born 1945) – Tudor historian and TV presenter
- Lawrence Stone (1919–1999) – English society and the history of the family
- Keith Thomas (born 1933) – Early Modern English Society
- E. P. Thompson (1924–1993) – British working class
- George Macaulay Trevelyan (1876–1962) – English history (many different periods)
- Hugh Trevor-Roper, Baron Dacre of Glanton (1914–2003) – Britain in the 17th century
- Retha Warnicke (born 1939) – Tudor history and gender issues
- Andy Wood (born 1967) – British social historian, 1500 to present
- Daniel Woolf (born 1958) – Early Modern England and History of Historical Writing
- Cicely Veronica Wedgwood (1910–1997) – British
- G. M. Young (1882–1959) - Victorian England
- Perez Zagorin (1920–2009) – 16th and 17th centuries

==== History of the British Empire ====
- Antoinette Burton
- Robert Bickers (born 1964)
- Richard Drayton (born 1964)
- Gerald S. Graham (1903–1988)
- Vincent T. Harlow (1898–1961)
- Wm. Roger Louis (born 1936)
- P. J. Marshall (1933–2025)
- David Quinn (1909–2002)
- D. M. Schurman (1924–2013)
- Archibald Paton Thornton (1921–2004)
- Glyndwr Williams (1932–2022)

==== History of Croatia ====
- Johannes Lucius (1604–1679)
- Pavao Ritter Vitezović (1652–1713)
- Franjo Rački (1828–1894)
- Tadija Smičiklas (1843–1914)
- Vjekoslav Klaić (1849–1928)
- Ferdo Šišić (1869–1940)
- Nada Klaić (1920–1988)
- Mirjana Gross (1922–2012)
- Trpimir Macan (born 1935)
- Ivo Banac (1947–2020)
- Radoslav Katičić (1930–2019)

==== History of Finland ====
- Mikhail Borodkin (1852–1919)
- Kesar Ordin (1835–1892)
- Anthony F. Upton (1929–2007)

==== History of France ====
- Marc Bloch (1886–1944) – medieval France
- Jean-Jacques Becker (1928–2023) - French historian of contemporary history
- Vincent Cronin (1924–2011) – Louis XIV, Louis XVI, Marie Antoinette, Napoleon, and Paris
- Natalie Zemon Davis (1928–2023) – early modern France
- Georges Duby (1924–1996) – medieval France
- Lucien Febvre (1878–1956) – French historian
- Alistair Horne (1925–2017) – modern French military history
- Julian Jackson (born 1954) – 20th century France
- Douglas Johnson (1925–2005) – historian of modern France
- Simon Kitson (born c. 1967) – historian of Vichy France
- Emmanuel Le Roy Ladurie (1929–2023) – history of the French peasantry
- Michael Marrus (born 1941) – Vichy France
- John M. Merriman (born 1946) - French Historian
- Jules Michelet (1798–1874) – French historian
- Roland Mousnier (1907–1993) – early modern France
- Robert Roswell Palmer (1909–2002) – French revolution
- Robert Paxton (born 1932) – Vichy France
- Pierre Renouvin (1893–1974) – French diplomatic history
- Andrew Roberts (born 1963) – Napoleon
- John C. Rule (1929–2013) – 17th and 18th century France
- Zeev Sternhell (1935–2020) – French fascism
- Richard Vaughan (1927–2014) – Valois Burgundy
- Eugen Weber (1925–2007) – modern French history
- John B. Wolf (1907–1996) – French history
- Isser Woloch (born 1937) – 18th century France
- Gordon Wright (1912–2000)
- Robert J. Young (born 1942) – the Third Republic

See also List of historians of the French Revolution.

==== History of Germany ====
- Celia Applegate – music history and nationalism
- David Blackbourn (born 1949)
- Gisela Bock (born 1942)
- Horst Boog (1928–2016) – military history
- Karl Dietrich Bracher (1922–2016)
- Martin Broszat (1926–1989)
- Alan Bullock (1914–2004)
- Robert Citino (born 1958) – military history
- Gordon A. Craig (1913–2005)
- Richard J. Evans (born 1947)
- Joachim Fest (1926–2006)
- Fritz Fischer (1908–1999)
- Luise Gerbing (1855–1927), history of Thuringia
- Deborah Hertz (born 1949)
- Klaus Hildebrand (born 1941)
- Andreas Hillgruber (1925–1989)
- Jonathan House (born 1950)
- Christian Hartmann (born 1959) – military history
- Gerhard Hirschfeld (born 1946) – 20th century German social, World War I & II
- Eberhard Jäckel (1929–2017)
- Ian Kershaw (born 1943)
- Klemens von Klemperer (1916–2012)
- Ernst Klink (1923–1993) – military history
- Claudia Koonz (born 1940)
- Dieter Langewiesche (born 1943)
- Timothy Mason (1940–1990)
- Frank McDonough (born 1957)
- Wendy Lower (born 1965) – history of National Socialism
- Geoffrey P. Megargee (born 1959) – military history
- Friedrich Meinecke (1862–1954)
- Hans Mommsen (1930–2015)
- Wolfgang Mommsen (1930–2004)
- George Mosse (1918–1999)
- Ernst Nolte (1923–2016)
- Steven Ozment (1939–2019)
- Detlev Peukert (1950–1990)
- Koppel Pinson (1904–1961)
- Gerhard Ritter (1888–1967)
- Hans Rothfels (1891–1976)
- David Schoenbaum (born 1935)
- Jean Edward Smith (1932–2019)
- Ronald Smelser (born 1942)
- Louis Leo Snyder (1907–1993)
- Fritz Stern (1926–2016)
- David Stahel (born 1975)
- Michael Stürmer (1938–2026)
- Heinrich von Treitschke (1834–1896)
- A.J.P. Taylor (1906–1990)
- Hugh Trevor-Roper (1914–2003) – British historian and peer who specialized on Nazi leadership and incorrectly verified the authenticity of The Hitler Diaries
- Henry Ashby Turner (1932–2008)
- Gerd R. Ueberschär (born 1943) – military history
- Bernd Wegner (born 1949) – military history and history of National Socialism
- Hans-Ulrich Wehler (1931–2014)
- Wolfram Wette (born 1940) – military history and history of National Socialism
- John Wheeler-Bennett (1902–1975)
- Jay Winter (born 1945)
- Michael Wolffsohn (born 1947)
- Gordon Wright (1912–2000) – Germany – 19th and 20th centuries
- David T. Zabecki (born 1947) – military history
- Alfred-Maurice de Zayas (born 1947)
- Rainer Zitelmann (born 1957)

==== History of the Habsburg monarchy ====
- John Komlos (born 1944) – economic

==== History of Ireland ====
- Mary Bonaventure Browne (after 1610–after 1670), Poor Clare and historian
- Ann Buckley
- Francis John Byrne (1934–2017)
- John Clyn (fl. 1333–1349)
- James Donnelly (born 1943) – Irish social history
- Brian Farrell (1929–2014)
- Roy Foster (born 1949)
- Kathleen Hughes (1926–1977)
- Geoffrey Keating
- J.J. Lee (born 1942) – 20th century Ireland
- James Francis Lydon (1928–2013)
- F.S.L. Lyons (1923–1983) – modern Ireland
- Oliver MacDonagh (1924–2002) – modern Ireland
- Dermot MacDermot (1906–1989)
- Dubhaltach MacFhirbhisigh (fl. 1643–1671)
- Gilla Isa Mor mac Donnchadh MacFhirbhisigh (fl. 1390–1418)
- Muirchu moccu Machtheni (fl. late 7th century)
- Flann Mainistrech (died 1056)
- F.X. Martin (1922–2000)
- Kenneth Nicholls (1934–2025)
- Adhamh Ó Cianáin (died 1373)
- Mícheál Ó Cléirigh (c. 1590–1643)
- Dáibhí Ó Cróinín (born 1954)
- Eugene O'Curry (1794–1862)
- John O'Donovan (1806–1861)
- Seán Mór Ó Dubhagáin (died 1372)
- Pilip Ballach Ó Duibhgeannáin (fl. 1579–1590)
- Ruaidhrí Ó Flaithbheartaigh (1629–1718)
- Nollaig Ó Muraíle
- Tírechán (fl. late 7th century)
- Father Paul Walsh (1885–1941)
- Sir James Ware (1594–1666)

==== History of Italy ====
- Lorenzo Arnone Sipari (born 1973) – social and environmental Italian history
- R.J.B. Bosworth (born 1943) – Fascism, Mussolini
- Benedetto Croce (1866–1952) – philosophy of history, modern Italian history
- Vincent Cronin (1924–2011) – Renaissance art and Sicily
- Renzo De Felice (1929–1996) – Fascism, biographer of Mussolini
- John Foot (born 1964) – modern Italy history, The City
- Emilio Gentile (born 1946) – Fascism
- Carlo Ginzburg (1939–2026) – witchcraft and agrarian cults, microhistory
- Alessandra Kersevan (born 1950) – Italian concentration camps
- Claudio Pavone (1920–2016) – Italian fascism, World War II, anti-fascism
- Effie Pedaliu – Italian war crimes
- John Pollard (born 1944) – The church and Fascism
- Paul Ginsborg (born 1945) – The Risorgimento, Italian modern and contemporary history
- Lucy Riall (born 1962) – The Risorgimento, Garibaldi, Sicily
- Gaetano Salvemini (1873–1957) – Fascism, French Revolution
- Denis Mack Smith (1920–2017) – Italian modern history
- Arrigo Petacco (1929–2018) – Fascism

==== History of Moldova/Bessarabia ====
- Nicolae Iorga (1871–1940)
- Ion Nistor (1876–1962)
- Petre Cazacu (1873–1956)
- Charles King (born 1967)
- Igor Casu (born 1973)
- Gh. Cojocaru (born 1963)

==== History of the Netherlands ====
- Jaap R. Bruijn (1938–2022)
- Femme Gaastra (born 1945)
- Pieter Geyl (1887–1966)
- John Lothrop Motley (1814–1877)
- Jonathan Israel (born 1946)
- G. J. Renier (1892–1962)
- Herbert H. Rowen (1916–1999)
- Simon Schama (born 1945)

==== History of Poland ====
- Norman Davies (born 1939) – modern Polish history
- Robert I. Frost (born 1958) — modern Polish history
- Pawel Jasienica (1909–1970) – Polish amateur historian
- Wickham Steed (1871–1956)

==== History of Portugal ====
- José Hermano Saraiva (1919–2012)
- A. H. de Oliveira Marques (1933–2007) – early modern period
- José Mattoso (1933–2023) – medieval history
- Fernando Rosas (born 1946) – contemporary history

==== History of Romania ====
- Lucian Boia (born 1944)
- Bogdan Petriceicu Hasdeu (1838–1907)
- Nicolae Iorga (1871–1940)
- Mihail Kogalniceanu (1817–1891)
- Irina Livezeanu (born 1952)
- David Mitrany (1888–1975)
- Vladimir Tismaneanu (born 1951)
- Alexandru D. Xenopol (1847–1920)
- Alexandru Zub (born 1934)

==== History of Russia ====
- Nicholas Bethell (1938–2007)
- Robert Conquest (1917–2015) – Soviet Union
- Vincent Cronin (1924–2011) – Catherine the Great
- Orlando Figes (born 1959)
- Patricia Kennedy Grimsted (born 1935) – post-Soviet archives
- Geoffrey Hosking (born 1942)
- Lindsey Hughes (1949–2007) - C17th and C18th
- Leopold Labedz (1920–1993)
- Roy Medvedev (1925–2026)
- Robin Milner-Gulland (born 1936) - cultural history
- Richard Pipes (1923–2018) – Soviet Union
- William Taubman (born 1941) – Nikita Khrushchev
- Peter Kenez (born 1937) – Soviet Union and Soviet cinema
- Robert Service (born 1947)
- Adam Ulam (1922–2000)
- Anne Applebaum (born 1964) – Gulag history
- Sheila Fitzpatrick (born 1941) – everyday life under Stalinism
- Nicolas Werth (born 1950) – political repressions
- Nikita Petrov (born 1957) – political repressions
- Viktor Danilov (1927–2016) – history of collectivization
- Oleg Khlevniuk (born 1959) – Stalin and Politburo
- Moshe Lewin (1921–2010) – collectivization
- David Shearer (born 1957) – Stalinist repressions

==== History of Serbia ====
- Vladimir Ćorović (1885–1941)
- Sima Ćirković (1929–2009)
- Rade Mihaljčić (1937–2020)
- Stojan Novaković (1842–1915)
- Stanoje Stanojević (1874–1937)
- Jovan I. Deretić (1939–2021)

==== History of Scotland ====
- G. W. S. Barrow (1924–2013)
- Steve Boardman
- Hector Boece (1465–1536)
- George Buchanan (1506–1582)
- Gilbert Burnet (1643–1715)
- Tom Devine (born 1945)
- John of Fordun
- Christopher Harvie (born 1944)
- Colin Kidd (born 1964)
- Michael Lynch (born 1946)
- Norman Macdougall
- Edgar J. March (1897–1971) History of Scottish (and English and Welsh) working sailing craft and associated culture.
- Rosalind Mitchison (1919–2002)
- Richard Oram
- T.C. Smout (born 1933) - Scottish social history
- Nigel Tranter (1909–2000)
- Christopher Whatley
- Jenny Wormald (1942–2015)

===== Historiographer Royal of Scotland =====
- James Fall, 1682
- William Robertson (1721–1793), 1763–1793
- John Gillies (1747–1836), 1793–1836
- George Brodie (1786–1967), 1836–1867
- John Hill Burton (1809–1881), 1867–1881
- William Forbes Skene (1809–1892), 1881–1893
- David Masson (1822–1907), 1893–1908
- Peter Hume Brown (1849–1918), 1908–1919
- Robert Rait (1874–1936), 1919–1930
- Robert Kerr Hannay(1867–1940), FRSE, 1930–1940
- J. D. Mackie (1887–1978), OBE, 1958–1978
- Gordon Donaldson (1913–1993), CBE, 1979–1993
- Christopher Smout (born 1933), CBE, since 1993

==== History of Slovakia ====
- Vojtech Čelko (born 1946) – political and cultural history of Central Europe in the 20th century; history of Czechoslovak exile after 1948
- Ladislav Deák (1931–2011) – foreign policy of Central European states and Yugoslavia in the interwar period; history of Hungarian-Slovak foreign relationships
- Gabriela Dudeková (born 1968) – social policy of Austria-Hungary; situation of POWs and civilians in World War I; history of feminism and gender studies
- Ivan Kamenec (born 1938) – Holocaust in Slovakia; diplomacy in Central Europe in the interwar period and during World War II
- Adam František Kollár (1718–1783) – influential jurist, historian and ethnologist, who coined the term ethnology
- Juraj Marusiak (born 1970) – history of Slovak-Polish relationships; modern history of Central and Eastern Europe
- Thomas Spira (1923–2005) – study of nationalism and ethnicity (born and raised in Slovakia)
- Pavel Jozef Šafárik (1795–1861) – philologist, poet, Slavist, literary historian and ethnographer
- Štefan Šutaj (born 1954) – history of Hungarian minority in Czechoslovakia; Slovak civic (non-communist) political parties after 1945
- Zora Mintalová-Zubercová (born 1950) – food history and material culture of Central Europe

==== History of Slovenia ====
- Bogo Grafenauer (1916–1995)
- Alessandra Kersevan (born 1950) – Italian concentration camps
- Vasilij Melik (1921–2009) – Slovene Lands in the 19th century.
- Jože Pirjevec (born 1940) – Foibe massacres
- Milica Kacin Wohinz (1930–2021) – Italianization of Slovenes between 1918 and 1943
- Marta Verginella (born 1960) – history of the Slovene minority in Italy (1920–1947)

==== History of Spain ====
- Ida Altman (born 1950) – Early modern Spain, colonial Latin America
- Roger Collins (born 1949) – medieval history, Spain, Visigothic Spain, history of Muslim Spain
- Rafael Núñez Florencio (born 1956)
- Julian Ribera y Tarragó (1858–1934) – Spain, history of the Book, medieval history, history of Muslim Spain
- Julia Pavón (born 1968) – medieval history of Navarra
- Joseph Pérez (1931–2020) - history of the Spanish Empire.

==== History of Sweden ====
- Peter Englund (born 1957)
- Anders Fryxell (1795–1881)
- Erik Gustaf Geijer (1783–1847)
- Jan Glete (1947–2009)
- Carl Grimberg (1875–1941)
- Dick Harrison (born 1966)
- Ragnhild Hatton (1913–1995) – biographer of King Charles XII
- Sten Lindroth (1914–1980)
- Erik Lönnroth (1910–2002)
- Olaus Magnus (1490–1557)
- Samuel von Pufendorf (1632–1694)
- Erik Ringmar (born 1960)
- Michael Roberts (1908–1996)
- John Robinson (1650–1723)
- Anthony F. Upton (1929–2015)
- Curt Weibull (1886–1991)
- Lauritz Weibull (1873–1960)

==== History of Yugoslavia ====
- Ivo Banac (1947–2020)
- Misha Glenny (born 1958)
- Barbara Jelavich (1923–1995) – wrote extensively on Balkan history, along with her husband Charles Jelavich
- John R. Lampe (1935–2024) – author of Yugoslavia As History: Twice There Was a Country
- Stevan K. Pavlowitch (1933–2022)
- Catherine Samary (born 1945) – author of Yugoslavia Dismembered
- Stephen Schwartz (born 1948)
- Jozo Tomasevich (1908–1994)

=== Europe and Asia ===
==== History of The Republic of Turkey and Turkish Empires ====
- Halil İnalcık (1916–2016), İstanbul, Turkey), history of the Ottoman Empire and the Republic of Turkey
- İlber Ortaylı (born 1947, Bregen, Austria), history of the Ottoman Empire and the Republic of Turkey
- Heath W. Lowry (born 1942, America), history of the Ottoman Empire and modern Turkey
- Mehmet Fuat Köprülü (1890–1966, İstanbul, Turkey), Turcologist and historian, history of the Ottoman Empire and the Republic of Turkey
- Yusuf Halaçoğlu (born 1949, Adana, Turkey), history of the Ottoman Empire and the Republic of Turkey
- Reşat Ekrem Koçu (1905–1975, İstanbul, Turkey), writer and historian, history of the Ottoman Empire
- Ahmed Cevad Pasha (Kabaağaçlızade Ahmet Cevat Paşa) (1851–1900, İstanbul, Turkey), Ottoman statesman (Grand Vizier), history of the Ottoman Empire
- Aşıkpaşazade (Âşıkpasazâde Derviş Ahmet Âşıkî) (yak. 1400, Amasya–yak. 1484), Ottoman Empire/ Turkey) history of the Ottoman Empire
- Ibn Kemal (Kemal Paşazade (ibn-i Kemâl)) (1468–1534, The Ottoman Empire/Turkey), Ottoman statesman, history of the Ottoman Empire
- Koçi Bey (Mustafa Koçi Bey) (?–1650, The Ottoman Empire/Turkey), Ottoman statesman, history of the Ottoman Empire
- Katip Çelebi (Haci Halife Kalfa) (1609–1657, İstanbul, The Ottoman Empire/Turkey), history of the Ottoman Empire

=== Asia ===
==== Middle East ====
- George Antonius (1891–1941) – historian of Arab nationalism
- Vincent Cronin (1924–2011) – study of the Faiqani tribe of South Persia
- Neilson Debevoise (1903–1992) – history of the Parthian Empire
- Caroline Finkel
- Hamilton Alexander Rosskeen Gibb (1895–1971) – Editor, The Encyclopaedia of Islam
- Bernard Lewis (1916–2018) – history of Islam and the Middle East
- S.D. Goitein (1900–1985) - history of the Mediterranean; social history of the Medieval Islamic world
- Albert Hourani (1915–1993)
- ‘Ala’ al-Din ‘Ata Malik Juvayni (1226–1283) – Ta’rīkh-I-Jahān Gushā (A History of the World-Conqueror Chingis Khān)
- Ibn Khaldun (1332–1406)
- Walid Khalidi (1925–2026) – Palestinian historian
- D. S. Margoliouth (1858–1940)
- Michael Oren (born 1955)
- Rashid-al-Din Hamadani (circa 1247–1318) – Jāmi‛ al-Tawārīkh (Compendium of Chronicles), Ta’rīkh–i-Ghāzānī (a history of the Mongols and Turks)
- Heleen Sancisi-Weerdenburg (1944–2000) – Achaemenid history
- Ibn al-Tiqtaqa (born c. 1262) – Shi'i historian, wrote Al-Fakhīr

==== Central Asia ====
- Denis Sinor (1916–2011), Hungarian-American historian of Central Asia
- Edward A. Allworth (1920–2016), American historian specializing in Central Asia
- Étienne de la Vaissière (born 1969), French specialist of Sogdian culture and early medieval Central Asia
- Geoffrey Wheeler (1897–1990), British soldier and historian of Central Asia
- Lola Dodkhudoeva (born 1951), Tajikistani historian specialising in medieval Central Asian affairs
- Svetlana Gorshenina (born 1969), Uzbek specialist on Pre-Islamic Central Asia

==== South Asia ====
===== History of the Indian Subcontinent =====
- Muzaffar Alam (born 1947)
- A. L. Basham (1914–1986)
- Chris Bayly (1945–2015)
- Dipesh Chakrabarty (born 1948)
- Bernard Cohn (1928–2003)
- Sir Jadunath Sarkar (1870–1958)
- R. C. Majumdar (1884–1980)
- Niharranjan Ray (1903–1981)
- Datto Vaman Potdar (1890–1979)
- Tryambak Shankar Shejwalkar (1895–1963)
- Ram Sharan Sharma (1919–2011)
- Nicholas Dirks (born 1950)
- Ranajit Guha (1923–2023)
- Ayesha Jalal (born 1956)
- John Keay (born 1941)
- Sumit Sarkar (1939–2026)
- Romila Thapar (born 1931)
- Irfan Habib (born 1931)
- Thomas Metcalf (1934–2026)
- Barbara Metcalf (born 1941)
- Percival Spear (1901–1982)
- Bipan Chandra (1928–2014)
- Gyan Prakash (born 1952)
- Tanika Sarkar
- Barbara Ramusack (born 1937)
- Thomas Trautmann (born 1940)
- K. K. Aziz (1927–2009)
- Mubarak Ali (born 1941)
- Mohammad Ishaq Khan (1946–2013)
- NS Rajaram (1943–2019)
- Sukumar Sen (linguist) (1900–1992)
- Suniti Kumar Chatterji (1890–1977)

===== History of India =====
- Isabel Giberne Sieveking (1857–1936) – Indian Mutiny
- Hakim Syed Zillur Rahman (born 1940) – Unani historian

===== History of Pakistan =====
- K. K. Aziz (1927–2009)
- Imran Khan (born 1952)

==== Far East ====
===== History of Japan =====
- William George Aston (1841–1911)
- Gail Lee Bernstein (born 1939)
- Harold Bolitho (1939–2010)
- Hugh Borton (1903–1995)
- Jeremy Cowan (1923–2013)
- Albert M. Craig (1927–2021)
- Sheldon Garon (born 1951)
- Carol Gluck (born 1941)
- Andrew Gordon (born 1952)
- William Elliot Griffis (1843–1928)
- John Whitney Hall (1916–1997)
- Susan Hanley (born 1939)
- Marius Jansen (1922–2000)
- Donald Keene (1922–2019)
- Joyce Lebra (1925–2021)
- Jeffrey Mass (1940–2001)
- Richard Ponsonby-Fane (1878–1937)
- Tetsuo Najita (1936–2021)
- Ian Nish (1926–2022)
- Edwin O. Reischauer (1910–1990)
- Donald Richie (1924–2013)
- George Bailey Sansom (1883–1965)
- Ernest Mason Satow (1843–1929)
- Amy Stanley (born 1978)
- Conrad Totman (born 1934)
- Stephen Turnbull (born 1948)
- Barak Kushner (born 1968)

===== History of Korea =====
- Bruce Cumings (born 1943) – modern Korea
- Carter J. Eckert (1945–2024)
- James Palais (1934–2006)
- Il-yeon (1206–1289)
- Kim Pusik (1075–1151) – early annalist
- Kim Taemun
- Lee Ki-baek (1924–2004)
- James Hoare (born 1943)
- Shin Chae-ho (1880–1936) – ancient Korean history
- Andre Schmid (born 1963)
- Yu Deuk-gong (1749–1807) – Balhae
- Odd Arne Westad (born 1960) – professor at the London School of Economics

===== History of China =====
- Robert Bickers (born 1964) - modern China
- Immanuel C.Y. Hsu (1923–2005) - modern China
- John Herman (1889–1950)
- Ann Paludan (1928–2014) – ancient China
- Sima Qian – compiled Records of the Grand Historian
- Chen Shou (233–297) – author of the Records of Three Kingdoms.
- Jonathan D. Spence (1936–2021)
- Denis Twitchett (1925–2006) – Cambridge scholar, and editor of The Cambridge History of China
- Hans van de Ven (born 1958)
- Frederic Wakeman, Jr. (1937–2006)
- Odd Arne Westad (born 1960) – professor at the London School of Economics and author of many books on China

==== History of Hong Kong ====
- Steve Tsang (born 1959)

==== History of the Philippines ====
- Arius Raposas (born 1996)

=== Africa ===
- David Cohen (born 1943)
- A. G. Hopkins (born 1938) – European colonialism and globalisation
- William Miller Macmillan (1885–1974)
- Michael McWilliam (born 1933) – British Commonwealth
- Jocelyne Dakhlia (born 1959) – political and cultural history of Islam in the Maghreb
- Jan Vansina (1929–2017)

==== History of the Serers ====
- Alioune Sarr (1908–2001), Senegalese specialist on Serer medieval history
- Henry Gravrand (1921–2003), French specialist on Serer ancient history, Serer medieval history and Serer religion
- Issa Laye Thiaw (1943–2017), Senegalese specialist on Serer general history and Serer religion
- Alhaji Alieu Ebrima Cham Joof (1924–2011), Gambian specialist on Serer general history and history of Senegambia (Senegal and Gambia)
- Marguerite Dupire (1920–2015), French scholar of Serer religion and history
- Louis Diène Faye (born 1936), Senegalese scholar of Serer religion and history

=== Oceania ===
==== History of Australia ====
- Manning Clark (1915–1991)
- Keith Windschuttle (1942–2025)
- Geoffrey Blainey (born 1930)
- Stuart Macintyre (1947–2021)
- Henry Reynolds (born 1938)
- Frank Welsh (1931–2023)
- Andrew Moore (born 1953)

==== History of Fiji ====
- Brij Lal (1952–2021)

==== History of New Zealand ====
- James Belich (born 1956)
- Michael King (1945–2004)
- W. H. Oliver (1925–2015)
- William Pember Reeves (1857–1932)
- J. G. A. Pocock (1924–2023)
- Keith Sinclair (1922–1993)

==== History of Tonga ====
- Sione Lātūkefu (1927–1995)

==== History of Papua New Guinea ====
- John Waiko (born 1945)

== By historical viewpoint ==
=== Abolitionist ===
- George Washington Williams (1849–1891) – Early African-American historian

=== Counterfactual ===
- Niall Ferguson (born 1964) – Virtual History: Alternatives and Counterfactuals (1997)

=== Marxist ===
- Eric Foner (born 1943) – Marxist historian of the American Civil War and Reconstruction
- Eugene D. Genovese (1930–2012) – Marxist historian of southern US history and slavery
- Ranajit Guha (1923–2023) – Indian Marxist historian
- Christopher Hill (1912–2003) – 17th century England
- Eric Hobsbawm (1917–2012) – Marxist historian of the modern world
- Gerald Horne (born 1949) – African American Marxist historian
- Timothy Wright Mason (1940–1990) – Marxist historian who worked on the history of National Socialism and the German working-class
- Maxime Rodinson (1915–2004) – French Marxist historian on the history of Islam
- Sumit Sarkar (1939–2026) – Indian Marxist historian
- Edward Palmer Thompson (1924–1993) – British Marxist historian, author of The Making of the English Working Class
- Walter Rodney (1942–1980) – Marxist historian of Africa

=== Nazi ===
- Walter Frank (1905–1945) – Nazi historian and anti-Semitic writer
- David Hoggan (1923–1988)

=== Anarchist ===
- Paul Avrich (1931–2006) – USA, oral history of the U.S. and Russia
- Murray Bookchin (1921–2006) – USA, writer; founder of "social ecology"
- Sam Dolgoff (1902–1990) – USA, writer, activist, co-founder of Anarcho-Syndicalist Review
- Sébastien Faure (1858–1942) – France, Encyclopedie Anarchiste, 4 volumes (1932–1934)
- David Goodway (born 1942) – UK, writer, editor
- Daniel Guérin (1904–1988) – France, writer, editor Libertarian Communist
- Robert Graham (born 1958) – USA, writer, editor
- Andrej Grubačić (born 1976) – Bulgarian history and anarchism, lecturer at University of San Francisco
- Peter Marshall (born 1946) – England, historian, philosopher, writer (of Demanding the Impossible: A History of Anarchism, 1992)
- Chuck W. Morse (born 1969) – USA, writer, founder of Institute for Anarchist Studies(IAS)
- Max Nettlau (1865–1944) – Austria, writer of Geschichte der Anarchie, seven volumes
- Abel Paz (1921–2009) – Spain, Civil war, Durruti, CNT/FAI
- José Peirats (1908–1989) – Spain, historian of the CNT/FAI
- Alexandre Skirda (1942–2020)
- Antonio Tellez (1921–2005)
- Dana Ward – founder of "Anarchist Archives", Online Research on the History and Theory of Anarchism, (USA)
- George Woodcock (1912–1995)
- Howard Zinn (1922–2010)

=== Pacifist ===
- Ludwig Quidde (1858–1941) – Prescient German pacifist and student of history who combined his specialties in his condemnation of Kaiser Wilhelm II

== By general category ==
=== Architectural history ===
- Marcus Vitruvius Pollio (c. 80/70 BC?–c. 25 BC) – Roman architect and engineer, author of De architectura
- Leon Battista Alberti (1404–1472) – Italian polymath, active in many fields, author of De Re Aedificatoria among others
- Josef Strzygowski (1862–1941)
- Joseph Rykwert (1926–2024)
- Manfredo Tafuri (1935–1994)
- David Watkin (historian) (1941–2018)
- Alberto Pérez-Gómez (born 1949)
- Doğan Kuban (1926–2021) – architect, history of architecture and art history

=== Art history ===
- Nurhan Atasoy (born 1934) – Turkish and Islamic art history
- Angelica Bäumer (1932–2025) – Art Brut and photography
- C. Ondine Chavoya (born 1970) – Latino art history, Chicano art history, queer art history
- Vincent Cronin (1924–2011) – French and Italian art and architectural history
- Oleg Grabar (1929–2011) – Islamic art history
- Carla de Jonge (1886-1972) — Delftware
- Kristen Lippincott (fl. 2026) - art and cultural history
- Catherine Mason – British computer and digital art history
- Nicholas Pevsner (1903–1983) – History of art and English architecture
- Alena Potůčková (1953–2018) – Czech art history
- Simon Schama (born 1945) – art history
- Ichimatsu Tanaka (1895–1983) – Japanese art history
- Eugenia Tenenbaum (born 1996) – women in art history
- Renáta Tyršová (1854–1937) – Czech ethnography and art history
- Yukio Yashiro (1890–1975) – Japanese art history; Botticelli and the Florentine Renaissance

=== Christianity ===
- Eusebius of Caesarea (c. 275–339) – "Father of Church history"
- Alexander Campbell Cheyne (1924–2006) – Scottish ecclesiastical historian
- John Gilmary Shea (1824–1892) – father of American Catholic History
- Bengt Hägglund (1920–2015) – historian of Christian theology
- Barbara Thiering (1930–2015) – rediscovered the "Pesher technique"

=== Classical Antiquity ===
- Werner Eck (born 1939)
- Robert Malcolm Errington (born 1939)
- Erich S. Gruen (born 1935)
- Ronald Syme (1903–1989)
- Robert Garland (born 1947)

=== Economic history ===
- Robert C. Allen (born 1947)
- Leah Boustan
- Eli Heckscher (1879–1952)
- Barry Eichengreen (born 1952)
- Niall Ferguson (born 1964)
- Robert Fogel (1926–2013)
- Alexander Gerschenkron (1904–1978)
- Claudia Goldin (born 1946)
- Susan Howson (born 1945)
- Harold James (born 1956)
- John Komlos (born 1944)
- Naomi Lamoreaux (born 1950)
- David S. Landes (1924–2013)
- Joel Mokyr (born 1946)
- Thomas Piketty (born 1971)
- W. W. Rostow (1916–2003)
- Tirthankar Roy (born 1960)
- Ram Sharan Sharma (1919–2011) – economic history of ancient India
- Robert Skidelsky (1939–2026)
- R. H. Tawney (1880–1962)
- Peter Temin (1937–2025)

=== Egyptology ===
- Hans-Werner Fischer-Elfert (born 1954)
- Ludwig David Morenz (born 1965)
- Richard B. Parkinson (born 1963)
- William Kelly Simpson (1928–2017)
- John W. Tait (born 1945)
- Edward F. Wente (born 1930)
- Penelope Wilson

=== Environmental history ===
- Christopher Smout (born 1933)
- William Cronon (born 1954) – Frederick Jackson Turner Professor of History, Geography, and Environmental Studies at the University of Wisconsin–Madison

=== Espionage ===
- Christopher Andrew (born 1941)
- John Barron (1930–2005)
- John Earl Haynes (born 1944)
- David Kahn (1930–2024)
- Victor Suvorov (born 1947)
- Nigel West (born 1951)

=== Food history ===
- Sidney Mintz (1922–2015)
- Massimo Montanari (born 1949)
- Zora Mintalová-Zubercová (born 1950)
- Alice Ross (1930–2020)

=== Gender history ===
- John Boswell (1947–1994) – homosexuality in medieval times
- Jane M. Bowers (1936–2022) – women in music history
- Elizabeth Crawford – women's suffrage
- Francisca de Haan (fl. 1998-) – Central, Eastern and South Eastern European Women's and Gender History
- Nahema Hanafi (born 1983) – gender studies
- Gerda Lerner (1920–2013) – women's history
- George Mosse (1918–1999)
- Marysa Navarro (1934–2025) – feminism
- June Purvis – women's history and feminist historiography
- Judith Tick (born 1943) – women in music history
- Retha Warnicke (born 1939) – gender issues

=== Historiography ===
- Ram Sharan Sharma (1919–2011)
- Alphonse Balleydier (1810–1859)
- Marc Bloch (1886–1944)
- Fernand Braudel (1902–1985)
- Herbert Butterfield (1900–1979)
- E. H. Carr (1892–1982)
- R. G. Collingwood (1889–1943)
- Geoffrey Elton (1921–1994)
- Richard J. Evans (born 1947)
- Pieter Geyl (1887–1966)
- J. H. Hexter (1910–1996)
- Emmanuel Le Roy Ladurie (1929–2023)
- Peter Novick (1934–2012)
- Leopold von Ranke (1795–1886)
- Hayden White (1928–2018)
- Frank Ankersmit (born 1945)

==== Academic protagonists in Australia's "history wars" ====
- Geoffrey Blainey (born 1930)
- Stuart Macintyre (1947–2021)
- Robert Manne (born 1947)
- Henry Reynolds (born 1938)
- Lyndall Ryan (1943–2024)
- Keith Windschuttle (born 1942)

=== History of business ===
- Alfred D. Chandler, Jr. (1918–2007)
- Jan Glete (1947–2009) – Swedish business history
- Allan Nevins (1890–1971)

=== History of ideas, culture, literature and philosophy ===
- Ram Sharan Sharma (1919–2011) – material culture in Ancient India
- Isaiah Berlin (1909–1997) – history of ideas
- J.C.D. Clark (born 1951) – British historian of 18th century ideas
- Jovan Deretić (1934–2002), Serbian literary history
- Michel Foucault (1926–1984) – history of ideas
- Peter Gay (1923–2015) – history of ideas
- A.O. Lovejoy (1873–1962) - history of ideas
- Lewis Mumford (1895–1988) – history of technology
- Hüseyin Nihâl Atsız (1905–1975, İstanbul, Turkey) – Turkology, Turkish Literature
- Pertev Naili Boratav (Mustafa Pertev) (1907–1998) – Turkish folklorist, Ottoman and Turkish culture
- Sedat Alp (1913–2006) – Hittitolo, historian, ancient Anatolian languages
- Marius Ostrowski (born 1988) - history of ideas and ideologies

=== History of international relations ===
- Harry Elmer Barnes (1889–1968)
- Herbert Butterfield (1900–1979)
- E.H. Carr (1892–1982)
- Gordon A. Craig (1913–2005)
- John Lewis Gaddis (born 1941) – historian of the Cold War
- Ragnhild Hatton (1913–1995) – historian of 17th- and 18th-century international relations
- Klaus Hildebrand (born 1941)
- Andreas Hillgruber (1925–1989)
- Paul Kennedy (born 1945) – British historian, author of influential The Rise and Fall of the Great Powers
- William L. Langer (1896–1977)
- Arno J. Mayer (1926–2023)
- Lewis Bernstein Namier (1888–1960)
- Paul W. Schroeder (1927–2020) – U.S. historian, 19th-century European international relations
- Jean Edward Smith (1932–2019)
- A.J.P. Taylor (1906–1990) – historian of European international relations
- Harold Temperley, (1879–1939) – British historian, Cambridge, 19th- and early 20th-century diplomatic history, British Documents on the Origins of the War, 1898–1914 (ed.)
- Ernest Llewellyn Woodward, (1890–1971)

=== History of science and technology ===
- Michael Adas (born 1943) – colonialism and imperialism, global history
- Jim Bennett (1947–2023) – mathematics, scientific instruments and astronomy
- Stephen G. Brush (born 1935)
- Vincent Cronin (1924–2011)
- Allen G. Debus (1926–2009) – chemistry and medicine
- A. Hunter Dupree (1921–2019) – botany; U.S. government policy on science and technology
- Peter Galison (born 1955) – physics, philosophy, objectivity
- John L. Heilbron (1934–2023) – physics, quantification, astronomy, religion and science
- Richard L. Hills (1936–2019) – technology, steam power
- Thomas P. Hughes (1923–2014) – technology
- Evelyn Fox Keller (1936–2023) – science and gender, biology
- Melvin Kranzberg (1917–1995) – technology
- Daniel J. Kevles (born 1939) – science and politics, physics, biology, eugenics
- Thomas Kuhn (1922–1996) – physics, "paradigm shifts"
- James Mosley (1935–2025) – printing
- David F. Noble (1945–2010) – science and technology-based industrial development
- Abraham Pais (1918–2000) – physics
- Giuliano Pancaldi (born 1946) – Italian science
- Theodore M. Porter (born 1953)
- A. I. Sabra (1924–2013) – optics, Islamic science
- Jack Simmons (1915–2000) – railway history
- Nathan Sivin (1931–2022) – history of science in China
- Kim H. Veltman (1948–2020) – science and art
- M. Norton Wise (born 1940)

=== History of the papacy ===
- Ludwig von Pastor (1854–1928) – wrote 40 volume history of the popes making extensive use of the Vatican Secret Archives

=== Holocaust ===
- Götz Aly (born 1947)
- Jean Ancel (1940–2008)
- Yitzhak Arad (1926–2021)
- David Bankier (1947–2010)
- Omer Bartov (born 1954)
- Paul R. Bartrop (born 1955)
- Yehuda Bauer (1926–2024)
- Georges Bensoussan (born 1952)
- Wolfgang Benz (born 1941)
- Michael Berenbaum (born 1945)
- Ruth Bettina Birn (born 1952)
- Donald Bloxham (born 1973)
- Randolph L. Braham (1922–2018)
- Richard Breitman (born 1947)
- Martin Broszat (1926–1989)
- Christopher Browning (born 1944)
- Michael Burleigh (born 1955)
- David Cesarani (1956–2015)
- Catherine Chatterley
- Richard I. Cohen (born 1946)
- John S. Conway (1929–2017)
- David M. Crowe (born 1943)
- Danuta Czech (1922–2004)
- Szymon Datner (1902–1989)
- Lucy Dawidowicz (1915–1990)
- Terrence Des Pres (1939–1987)
- Debórah Dwork
- Leo Eitinger (1912–1996)
- David Engel (born 1951)
- Barbara Engelking (born 1962)
- Richard J. Evans (born 1947)
- Andrew Ezergailis (born 1930)
- Esther Farbstein (born 1946)
- Norman Finkelstein (born 1953)
- Jack Fischel (born 1937)
- Michael Fleming
- Joseph Friedenson (1922–2013)
- Henry Friedlander (1930–2012)
- Saul Friedländer (born 1932)
- Tuvia Friling (born 1953)
- Christian Gerlach (born 1963)
- Martin Gilbert (1936–2015)
- Daniel Goldhagen (born 1959)
- Jan Grabowski (born 1962)
- Gideon Greif (born 1951)
- Jan T. Gross (born 1947)
- Elke Gryglewski (born 1965)
- Israel Gutman (1923–2013)
- Peter Hayes (born 1946)
- Susanne Heim (born 1955)
- Raul Hilberg (1926–2007)
- Klaus Hildebrand (born 1941)
- Eberhard Jäckel (1929–2017)
- Miroslav Kárný (1919–2001)
- Steven T. Katz (born 1944)
- Ian Kershaw (born 1943)
- Ernst Klee (1942–2013)
- David Kranzler (1930–2007)
- Shmuel Krakowski (1926–2018)
- Erich Kulka (1911–1995)
- Otto Dov Kulka (1933–2021)
- Konrad Kwiet (born 1941)
- Lawrence Langer (1929–2024)
- Jacek Leociak (born 1957)
- Dariusz Libionka (born 1963)
- Deborah Lipstadt (born 1947)
- Peter Longerich (born 1955)
- Richard C. Lukas (born 1937)
- Eugen Kogon (1903–1987)
- Michael Marrus (born 1941)
- Jürgen Matthäus (born 1959)
- Hans Mommsen (1930–2015)
- Kurt Pätzold (1930–2016)
- Franciszek Piper (born 1941)
- Detlev Peukert (1950–1990)
- Léon Poliakov (1910–1997)
- Antony Polonsky (born 1940)
- Dina Porat (born 1943)
- Laurence Rees (born 1957)
- Alvin H. Rosenfeld (born 1938)
- Mark Roseman (born 1958)
- John K. Roth
- Livia Rothkirchen (1922–2013)
- R. J. Rummel (1932–2014)
- Tom Segev (born 1945)
- Timothy D. Snyder (born 1969)
- Nicholas Stargardt (born 1962)
- Sybille Steinbacher (born 1966)
- Alan E. Steinweis (born 1957)
- Dan Stone (born 1971)
- Robert Jan van Pelt (born 1955)
- Nikolaus Wachsmann (born 1971)
- Kenneth Waltzer (born 1942)
- Rebecca Wittmann (born 1970)
- David Wyman (1929–2018)
- Hanna Yablonka (born 1950)
- Leni Yahil (1912–2007)

=== Lutheranism ===
- Johann Lorenz von Mosheim (1694–1755) – Lutheran historian of Christianity from its inception through the 18th century

=== Maritime history ===
- Robert G. Albion (1896–1983)
- William A. Baker (1911–1981)
- Jaap R. Bruijn (1938–2022)
- Howard I. Chapelle (1901–1975)
- Grahame Farr (1912–1983)
- Femme Gaastra (born 1945)
- John Hattendorf (born 1941)
- John de Courcy Ireland (1911–2006)
- Benjamin Woods Labaree (1927–2021)
- Edgar J. March (born 1897)
- Samuel Eliot Morison (1887–1976)
- J. H. Parry (1914–1982)
- E. Lee Spence (born 1947)
- Glyndwr Williams (1932–2022)

=== Media history ===
History of newspapers and magazines, History of radio, History of television, and History of the Internet

- Asa Briggs (1921–2016)

=== Military history ===
- C.T. Atkinson (1874–1964), historian of the British Army and Marlborough's Army
- Correlli Barnett (1927–2022) – British military historian
- Antony Beevor (born 1946) – British military historian
- Brian Bond (1936–2025) – First World War
- Caleb Carr (born 1955) – American military historian
- Michael Carver (1915–2001) – British soldier and historian
- Alan Clark (1928–1999) – British M.P. and historian
- Martin van Creveld (born 1946) – Israeli military historian
- Saul David (born 1966) – Military history
- Helen Fry (born 1967) – World War II espionage
- N.H. Gibbs (1910–1990) – Interwar period
- Adrian Goldsworthy (born 1969) – British military historian
- Jack Granatstein (born 1939) – Canadian military historian
- Bruce Barrymore Halpenny (1937–2015) – writer and military historian
- Victor Davis Hanson (born 1953) – American classicist and military historian
- Andreas Hillgruber (1925–1989) – German military historian
- Richard Holmes (1946–2011) – British military history
- Alistair Horne (1925–2017) – British historian of French military history
- Michael Howard (1922–2019) – modern military history
- John Keegan (1934–2012, English) – specialised in 20th-century wars
- Anthony Kemp (1939–2018) – English historian of history of World War II
- Frederic Kidder (1804–1885) - American historian of New England including military operations
- B. H. Liddell Hart (1895–1970) – military history
- Edward Luttwak (born 1942) – military strategy
- Piers Mackesy (1924–2014) – 18th century
- S. L. A. Marshall (1900–1977) – American military historian
- Jürgen Möller (born 1959) – German military historian
- Peter Paret (1924–2020) – military history
- Gordon Prange (1910–1980)
- Gerhard Ritter (1888–1967) – German military historian
- Cornelius Ryan (1920–1974) – World War II
- Digby Smith (1935–2024) – Napoleonic Wars
- Jean Edward Smith (1932–2019) – U.S. and German military historian
- Hew Strachan (born 1949) – British military historian
- Gerhard Weinberg (born 1928) – U.S. military historian
- Spenser Wilkinson (1853–1937)

=== Mormonism ===
- Leonard J. Arrington (1917–1999) – LDS Church historian 1975–1982
- B.H. Roberts (1857–1933)
- Fawn M. Brodie (1915–1981)
- Richard Bushman (born 1931)

=== Naval history ===
- Robert G. Albion (1896–1983) – maritime history
- Daniel A. Baugh (1931–2024)
- Ulane Bonnel (1918–2006)
- Josiah Burchett (1666–1746)
- Montagu Burrows (1819–1905)
- Geoffrey Callender (1875–1946)
- Howard I. Chapelle (1901–1975) – maritime history
- William Bell Clark (1889–1968)
- Julian Corbett (1854–1922)
- William S. Dudley (born 1936)
- Michael Duffy (born 1944)
- Jan Glete (1947–2009)
- James Goldrick (born 1958)
- Andrew Gordon (born 1951) – Battle of Jutland
- Barry M. Gough (born 1938)
- Kenneth J. Hagan (born 1936)
- Paul G. Halpern (born 1937)
- Daniel Gibson Harris (1915–2007)
- John Hattendorf (born 1941)
- John Daniel Hayes (1902–1991)
- J. Richard Hill (1929–2017)
- William James (1780–1827)
- Paul Kennedy (born 1945)
- R.J.B. Knight (born 1944)
- Dudley W. Knox (1877–1960)
- Andrew Lambert (born 1956)
- Harold D. Langley (1925–2020)
- John Knox Laughton (1830–1915)
- Thomas Lediard (1685–1743)
- Michael Lewis (1890–1970)
- Christopher Lloyd (1906–1986)
- Alfred Mahan (1840–1914)
- Arthur Marder (1910–1980)
- Tyrone G. Martin (1930–2026) – historian of the USS Constitution and of the history of ironclads
- William J. Morgan (1917–2003)
- Samuel Eliot Morison (1887–1976) – wrote History of United States Naval Operations in World War II and numerous works about the maritime exploration of the Americas
- Henry Newbolt (1862–1938) – wrote The Naval History of the Great War
- Michael Oppenheim (1853–1927)
- Charles O. Paullin (1869–1944)
- Werner Rahn (1939–2022)
- Bryan Ranft (1917–2001)
- Clark G. Reynolds (1939–2005)
- Herbert Richmond (1871–1946)
- N.A.M. Rodger (born 1949)
- Stephen Roskill (1903–1982)
- John Darrell Sherwood (born 1966)
- D.M. Schurman (1924–2013)
- William N. Still, Jr. (1932–2023)
- Craig L. Symonds (1946–2026)
- David Syrett (1939–2004)
- Geoffrey Till (born 1945)
- Johan Carel Marinus Warnsinck (1882–1943)
- Colin White (1951–2008)

=== Presbyterianism ===
- D.G. Hart (born 1956)

=== Science ===
- John Hedley Brooke (born 1944) – relationship between science and religion
- Herbert Butterfield (1900–1979) – Scientific Revolution
- I. Bernard Cohen (1914–2003) – Isaac Newton, Benjamin Franklin
- Floris Cohen (born 1946)
- Lorraine Daston (born 1951) – early modern history of science
- Stillman Drake (1910–1993) – Galileo Galilei
- Charles Coulston Gillispie (1918–2015)
- Edward Grant (1926–2020) – European science in the Middle Ages
- A. Rupert Hall (1920-2009) - Isaac Newton
- Thomas Kuhn (1922–1996) – Copernican Revolution
- Otto E. Neugebauer (1899–1990) – history of astronomy
- Roy Porter (1946–2002) – history of medicine
- George Sarton (1884–1956)
- David Wootton (born 1952) – Scientific Revolution

=== Social history ===
- David Rothman (1937–2020) — Father of American social history and the role of institutions in shaping history and society.
- Ram Sharan Sharma (1919–2011) – social history of ancient India
- Lloyd deMause (1931–2020) – psychohistory
- Gabriela Dudeková (born 1968)
- Ruth Goodman (born 1963) – early modern, British social history

== Intellectual history ==
- Carolina Armenteros
- Herbert Butterfield (1900–1979)
- David Lloyd Dusenbury
- Irena Grudzińska-Gross (born 1946)
- Gertrude Himmelfarb (1922–2019)
- Russell Jacoby (born 1945)
- Richard Lebrun
- Pierre Manent (born 1949)
- Elliot Neaman (born 1957)
- Steven Ozment (1939–2019)
- Jennifer Ratner-Rosenhagen
- Jon H. Roberts (born 1947)
- Helena Rosenblatt (born 1961)
- Ellis Sandoz (1931–2023)
- Larry Siedentop (1936–2024)
- James Turner (born 1946)
- Richard M. Weaver (1910–1963)
- Robert Wokler (1942–2006)
- Richard Wolin (born 1952)

== World history ==
- Felipe Fernández-Armesto (born 1950)
- Christopher Bayly (1945–2015) – British Empire and India
- Ferdinand Braudel (1902–1985) – social and economic history
- Will Durant (1885–1981) – author of The Story of Civilization
- Francis Fukuyama (born 1955) – "End of history" thesis
- Candice Goucher (born 1953)
- Hendrik Willem van Loon (1882–1944) – world history and geography for younger readers
- William McNeill (1917–2016) – author of The Rise of the West: A History of the Human Community
- Jürgen Osterhammel (born 1952)
- John Roberts (1928–2003) – author of [History of the World
- Ram Sharan Sharma (1919–2011)) – author of Vishwa Itihaas ki Bhumika in Hindi.
- Jackson J. Spielvogel (born 1939) – author of several major world history textbooks
- Arnold J. Toynbee (1889–1975) – wrote landmark text A Study of History
- Immanuel Wallerstein (1930–2019)

== Biography ==
- Peter Ackroyd (born 1949) – Dickens, Blake, Thomas More, Eliot, Newton
- James Boswell (1740–1795) – Samuel Johnson
- Alan Bullock (1914–2004) – historian best known for his influential biography of Hitler
- Robert Caro (born 1935) – Lyndon Johnson
- Thomas Carlyle (1795–1881) – Friedrich der Grosse (the Great)
- Vincent Cronin (1924–2011) – Louis XIV, Louis XVI and Marie Antoinette, Catherine the Great, and Napoleon
- Leon Edel (1907–1997) – Henry James
- Richard Ellmann (1918–1987) – James Joyce
- Erik Erikson (1902–1994) – psychoanalytic biographies of Luther and Gandhi
- Roy Foster (born 1949) – W.B. Yeats
- Joseph Frank (1918–2013) – Fyodor Dostoevsky
- David Garrow (born 1953), Martin Luther King, Jr.
- Elizabeth Gaskell (1810–1865) – Charlotte Brontë
- Stephen Greenblatt (born 1943) – Shakespeare
- Ragnhild Hatton (1913–1995) – King Charles XII of Sweden and King George I of Great Britain
- Walter Isaacson (born 1952) – geniuses
- Ian Kershaw (born 1943) – historian well known for his influential study of Hitler
- Ralph G. Martin (1920–2013) – Hubert H. Humphrey, Harry S. Truman, Edward VIII, Golda Meir, and John F. Kennedy
- Roi Medvedev (1925–2026) – Stalin
- Susan Quinn (born 1940) – Marie Curie
- Ron Rosenbaum (born 1946) – author of Explaining Hitler
- Norman Sherry (1925–2016) – Graham Greene
- Jean Edward Smith (1932–2019) – Franklin D. Roosevelt, Ulysses S. Grant, John Marshall, and Lucius D. Clay
- Suetonius – lives of the Caesars
- Lytton Strachey (1880–1932) – Eminent Victorians
- A.N. Wilson (born 1950) – Tolstoy
