= Kublanov =

Kublanov (Russian: Кубланов) is a Russian masculine surname, its feminine counterpart is Kublanova. It may refer to

- Lev Kublanov (born 1946), Russian-American graphic artist
- Mikhail Kublanov (1914–1998), Soviet scholar and historian of religion

What does Kublanov Mean? The ending of the name ov is a common ending in many Russian names which means "Family of."

Kubla can be traced back to the Mongolian emperor of China Kublai Khan.(It also can be traced back to a poem known as Kubla Khan by Samuel Taylor Coleridge.) It is only a speculation but it can be thought that the descendants of Kublai Khan started to move over from southern China to the North. His descendants started to live in an old East Slavic tribe until the name morphed to Kublanov aka Family of Kubla.

Bawden, Charles R.. "Kublai Khan". Encyclopedia Britannica, 1 Jan. 2024, https://www.britannica.com/biography/Kublai-Khan. Accessed 29 February 2024.
