= Elena Shtaerman =

Soviet academic (1914-1991)

- Born: 28 September 1914; Saint Petersburg
- Died: 22 October 1991 (aged 77); Moscow
- Occupation: Scientist, university teacher

Elena Mikhailovna Shtaerman (28 September 1914, in St. Petersburg – 22 October 1991, in Moscow) was a prominent Soviet scholar of Roman history and translator of ancient authors (Julius Paulus, Dionysius Cato, Publilius Syrus). She received the State Prize of the USSR.

Shtaerman studied under Nikolai Mashkin in Moscow, where she received her doctorate in 1942 and habilitation in 1956. From 1950, she was an academic assistant in the ancient history section of the Historical Institute of the USSR Academy of Sciences.

== Major works ==
- "Кризис рабовладельческого строя в западных провинциях Римской империи" ("The Crisis of Slavery in the Western Provinces of the Roman Empire", 1957)
- "Мораль и религия угнетенных классов Римской империи" ("Morality and Religion of the Oppressed Classes of the Roman Empire", 1961)
- "Расцвет рабовладельческих отношений в Римской республике" ("The Heyday of the Slave Relations in the Roman Republic", 1964)
- "Рабовладельческие отношения в ранней Римской империи" ("Slave Relationships in the Early Roman Empire", 1971)
- "Кризис античной культуры" ("The Crisis of Ancient Culture", 1975)
- "Древний Рим. Проблемы экономического развития" ("Ancient Rome. Issues of Economic Development", 1978)
- "Социальные основы религии Древнего Рима" ("Social Basis of the Religion of Ancient Rome", 1987).
