= Yuliya Kolosovskaya =

Soviet historian of classical antiquity (1920-2002)

Yuliya Konstantinovna Kolosovskaya (Russian: Юлия Константиновна Колосовская; 7 August 1920 – 29 March 2002) was a Soviet and Russian historian of classical antiquity. Kolosovskaya researched the history of Roman provinces on the Danube, especially Dacia and Pannonia. She was instrumental in establishing that the Romans left Dacia gradually, starting from the time of Gordian III, and not immediately. Kolosovskaya also studied provincial Roman epigraphy. From 1989 until her death, she was a member of the editorial board of the Journal of Ancient History.

Kolosovskaya was born in Naro-Fominsk. In 1934, her family moved to Moscow. Having finished the school in 1938, she graduated from the Moscow State University. Kolosovskaya began her scholar career under the guidance of Nikolai Mashkin. She authored over fifty scholar publications about ancient Rome.
