= Štefan Šutaj =

Slovak historian and professor

- Born: November 1, 1954; Michalovce, Czechoslovakia (today Slovakia)
- Citizenship: 1955–1993: Czechoslovakia since 1993: Slovakia
- Education: Pavol Jozef Šafárik University in Prešov (now Prešov University)
- Awards: Košice City Award (2015)
- Scientific career
- Workplaces: Slovak Academy of Sciences, Pavol Jozef Šafárik University

Prof. PaedDr. Štefan Šutaj, DrSc. (born November 1, 1954) is a Slovak historian and professor at Pavol Jozef Šafárik University, specializing in the history of Hungarian minority in Czechoslovakia and Slovak civic (non-communist) political parties after 1945. He is research worker and head of Department of History of the Institute of Social Sciences of the Slovak Academy of Sciences and also Slovak chairman of the Slovak-Hungarian Commission of Historians.

In 2008 he founded and until 2012 was departmental chair of the Department of History of the Faculty of Arts of the Pavol Jozef Šafárik University. Now he is deputy departmental chair and teaches there French historiography, Slovak history after 1945 and Proseminar in History.

== Works ==
- Šutaj, Štefan (1990). Vývoj a postavenie mad̕arskej národnostnej menšiny na Slovensku po roku 1948 [History and Status of the Hungarian Minority in Slovakia after 1948] (in Slovak). Košice: Spoločenskovedný ústav SAV. p. 228. OCLC 224175544.
- Šutaj, Štefan (1991). Reslovakizácia : Zmena národnosti časti obyvateľstva Slovenska po II. svetovej vojne [Reslovakization: Change of Nationality of Some Slovak Citizens after World War II] (in Slovak). Košice: Spoločenskovedný ústav SAV. p. 67. OCLC 30342697.
- Šutaj, Štefan (1993). "Akcia Juh" : Odsun Maďarov zo Slovenska do Čiech v roku 1949 ["Operation South": Deportation of Hungarians from Slovakia do Bohemia in 1949]. Sešity Ústavu pro soudobé dějiny AV ČR (in Slovak). Praha: Ústav pro soudobé dějiny AV ČR. p. 84. ISBN 8085270145. OCLC 637803895.
- Šutaj, Štefan (1993). Maďarská menšina na Slovensku v rokoch 1945-1948 : Východiská a prax politiky k maďarskej menšine na Slovensku [Hungarian Minority in Slovakia in 1945 – 1948: Outsets and Practice of Hungarian Minority Policy in Slovakia] (in Slovak). Bratislava: Veda. p. 196. ISBN 8022402095. OCLC 246835308.
- Šutaj, Štefan (1999). Občianske politické strany na Slovensku v rokoch 1944-1948 [Civic political parties in Slovakia in 1944 – 1948] (PDF) (in Slovak). Bratislava: Veda. p. 308. ISBN 8022405833. OCLC 43696999.
- Šutaj, Štefan; Mosný, Peter; Olejník, Milan (2002). Prezidentské dekréty Edvarda Beneša v povojnovom Slovensku [Presidential Decrees of Edvard Beneš in Slovakia after World War II] (in Slovak). Bratislava: Veda. p. 158. ISBN 8022407313. OCLC 53467146.
- Šutaj, Štefan (2004). Národ a národnosti na Slovensku : stav výskumu po roku 1989 a jeho perspektívy [Nation and nationalities in Slovakia : State of Research and Perspectives] (in Slovak). Prešov: Universum. p. 326. ISBN 8089046207. OCLC 244795388.
- Šutaj, Štefan (2004). Dekréty Edvarda Beneša v povojnovom období [Edvard Beneš Decrees after World War II] (in Slovak). Prešov: Universum. p. 118. ISBN 8089046215. OCLC 70104706.
- Šutaj, Štefan; Szarka, László (2004). Magyarok Csehszlovàkiàban 1945-1948 között : Tanulmànyok a benesi dekrétumokról; a csehorszàgi deportàlàsokró [Hungarians in Czechoslovakia between 1945 – 1948] (in Hungarian). Budapešť: Ludicidus. p. 292. OCLC 494856011.
- Šutaj, Štefan (2005). Nútené presídľovanie Maďarov do Čiech [Forced Resettlement of Hungarians to Bohemia] (in Slovak). Prešov: Universum. p. 156. ISBN 8089046290. OCLC 70052239.
- Šutaj, Štefan (2005). Národ a národnosti na Slovensku v transformujúcej sa spoločnosti : vzťahy a konflikty [Nations and Nationalities in Transforming Society: Relationships and Conflicts] (in Slovak). Prešov: Universum. p. 306. ISBN 8089046282. OCLC 70682835.
- Šutaj, Štefan (2005). Národnostná politika na Slovensku po roku 1989 [Minority Policy in Slovakia after 1989] (in Slovak). Prešov: Universum. p. 227. ISBN 8089046304. OCLC 70891295.
- Šutaj, Štefan (2006). Maďarská menšina na Slovensku v procesoch transformácie po roku 1989 : Identita a politika : Teoretická a empirická analáza dát zo sociologicko-sociálnopsychologického a historického výskumu [Hungarian Minority in Slovakia in Transformation Processes after 1989: Identity and Politics: Theoretical and Empirical Data Analysis of Social-Sociopsychological and Historical Research] (in Slovak). Prešov: Universum. p. 140. ISBN 808904641X. OCLC 219695577.
- Popély, Arpád; Šutaj, Štefan; Szárka, László (2007). Beneš-dekrétumok és a magyar kérdés, 1945-1948 : Történeti háttér, dokumentumok es jogszabályok [Beneš Decrees and Hungarian Problem, 1945 – 1948: Historical background, Documents and Legislation] (in Hungarian). Mariabesnyö-Gödöllő: Attraktor. p. 362. ISBN 978-9639580992. OCLC 227281869.
- Šutaj, Štefan (2007). Regionálna a národná identita v maďarskej a slovenskej histórii 18. – 20. storočia [Regional and National Identity in Hungarian and Slovak History of 18th – 20th Century]. Historica slovaco-hungarica – hungaro-slovaca (in Slovak). Prešov: Universum. p. 188. ISBN 978-8089046430. OCLC 220366779.
- Šutaj, Štefan (2008). ́Maďarská menšina na Slovensku po roku 1989 [Hungarian Minority in Slovakia after 1989] (in Slovak). Prešov: Universum. p. 216. ISBN 978-8089046546. OCLC 644081394.
- Sáposová, Zlatica; Šutaj, Štefan (2010). ́Povojnové migrácie a výmena obyvateľstva medzi Československom a Maďarskom [Post-war migration and population exchange between Czechoslovakia and Hungary] (in Slovak). Prešov: Universum. p. 221. ISBN 978-8089046645. OCLC 761911009.
- Šutaj, Štefan. The Magyar minority in Slovakia before and after the Second World War. In Teich, Mikuláš; Kováč, Dušan; Brown, Martin (eds.) (2011). Slovakia in history. Cambridge; New York: Cambridge University Press. ISBN 0521802539.
- Šutaj, Štefan; Franko, Štefan; Manor, Marty; Baka, Igor (2011). ́Key issues of Slovak and Hungarian history: A view of Slovak historians (in Slovak). Prešov: Universum. p. 258. ISBN 978-8089046669. OCLC 823723982.
- Šutaj, Štefan (2012). Maďarská menšina na Slovensku v 20. storočí [The Hungarian minority in Slovakia in the 20th century] (in Slovak). Bratislava: Kalligram. p. 398. ISBN 978-8081016387. OCLC 841166212.
