= Robert Malcolm Errington =

British historian and classical scholar (born 1939)

Robert Malcolm Errington (born 5 July 1939 in Howdon-on-Tyne), also known as R. Malcolm Errington, is a British historian and classicist. He is professor emeritus of Queen's University Belfast and the University of Marburg.

== Life and career ==
Errington is the son of a teacher. He studied Classics at Durham University, achieving a first-class BA in 1961 and his PhD in 1966. He was a member of Hatfield College Boat Club.

He taught at Queen's University Belfast from 1966 to 1973 before being appointed Professor of Ancient History at the University of Marburg in Germany, where he remained until his retirement. He served as project director of the Inscriptiones Graecae from 2001 to 2007. His research focused on the politics of ancient Greece and Macedon, Roman-Greek relations, Roman legal history, and the relations of the Eastern and Western Roman Empire.

== Bibliography ==
- Errington, Robert Malcolm (1969). Philopoemen. Oxford: Clarendon Press. ISBN 0-19-814270-6.
- ——— (1986). Geschichte Makedoniens. Von den Anfängen bis zum Untergang des Königreiches. München: C.H. Beck. ISBN 3-406-31412-0.
- ——— (1990). A History of Macedonia. Translated by Catherine Errington. Berkeley: University of California Press. ISBN 0-520-06319-8.
- ——— (2006). Roman Imperial Policy from Julian to Theodosius: Studies in the History of Greece and Rome. Chapel Hill, NC: University of North Carolina Press. ISBN 0-8078-3038-0.
- ——— (2008). A History of the Hellenistic World, 323–30 BC. Blackwell History of the Ancient World. Malden, MA: Blackwell. ISBN 978-0-631-23387-9.
- ——— (2020). Die Verträge der griechisch-römischen Welt von ca. 200 v. Chr. bis zum Beginn der Kaiserzeit. Die Staatsverträge des Altertums. Vol. 4. München: Verlag C.H. Beck. ISBN 978-3-406-02696-6.

== See also ==
- List of historians by area of study
