= Holly Brewer =

American historian

- Born: October 22, 1964 (age 61)

Holly Brewer (born October 22, 1964), is a legal historian. Since 2011, she has been Burke Professor of American History and Associate Professor of History at the University of Maryland, College Park. Before that, she was Assistant, Associate, and Full Professor of History at NC State in Raleigh, NC. She is also the director of the Slavery, Law, and Power project, an effort dedicated to bringing the many disparate sources that help to explain the long history of slavery and its connection to struggles over power in early America, particularly in the colonies that would become the United States.

From 2022 to 2023, she was chair of the Council of University System Faculty for the University System of Maryland, and from 2020 to 2023, she was Vice President and then President of the University of Maryland, College Park Branch of the American Association of University Professors.

In 2022, the Maryland Daily Record listed her as one of the top 30 most influential Marylanders in higher education.

== Education ==
Brewer earned her doctorate at UCLA in 1994 in American History (with specialties in British History and Political Theory) and her A.B. at Harvard/Radcliffe in 1986 in History of Science, specializing in early modern European History and Physics, magna cum laude.

While a graduate student, she submitted an article: "Entailing Aristocracy in Colonial Virginia: 'Ancient Feudal Restraints' and Revolutionary Reforms," published in the ''William and Mary Quarterly'' in April 1997. It won multiple awards: the Lester J. Cappon award for the best article published that year in the WMQ; the Douglass Adair Memorial Award for 2000 for the best article published in the William and Mary Quarterly in the past six years; and the James Clifford Prize for 1998 for the best article on any aspect of eighteenth-century culture, given by the American Society for Eighteenth Century Studies. It showed how the revolution impacted inheritance law in Virginia, arguing that feudal and hierarchical norms of inheritance via primogeniture were replaced by norms that allowed inheritance by all children, but that had problematic consequences for those enslaved because it separated Black families.

== Author ==
Her first book, By Birth or Consent: Children, Law, and the Anglo-American Revolution in Authority grew out of her 1994 UCLA dissertation. It was also awarded three prizes, the 2008 Biennial Book Award of the Order of the Coif from the Association of American Law Schools; the 2006 J. Willard Hurst Prize from the Law and Society Association; and the 2006 Cromwell Prize from the American Society for Legal History.

The American Society for Legal History awarded Dr. Holly Brewer the 2022 Sutherland Prize, an annual award given for the best article on the legal history of Britain and/or the British Empire for "Creating a Common Law of Slavery for England and its New World Empire."

== Guggenheim Fellowship ==
In 2014 she was awarded a Guggenheim Fellowship by the John Simon Guggenheim Foundation. She received that award for her work then in progress, on "Slavery, Sovereignty and Inheritable Blood," part of which was published as "Slavery, Sovereignty, and 'Inheritable Blood”: Reconsidering John Locke and the Origins of American Slavery,' in The American Historical Review in 2017. It was awarded the 2019 Srinivas Aravaduman Prize for an article "that pushes the boundaries, geographical and conceptual, of eighteenth-century studies, especially by using a transnational, comparative, or cosmopolitan approach" by the American Society for Eighteenth Century Studies. It was also awarded an honorable mention for the Clifford Prize. She published a more accessible version of it in AEON.

She also wrote the "Transformation of Domestic Law" in the Cambridge History of Law in America (2008).

Between 2010 and 2021, she served as co-editor of Studies in Legal History the Book Series of the American Society for Legal History, published with Cambridge University Press.

== News ==
On November 5, 2022, Judge J. Michael Luttig responded on Twitter to Dr. Holly Brewer's post, confirming that Judge Luttig had read and relied on Dr. Brewer's articles explaining how Vice President Thomas Jefferson did not rig the 1800 presidential vote count.

Luttig had tweeted: "Professor, your fascinating articles about Jefferson and the election of 1800 are brilliant expositions of the episode. Your historical — and historic — scholarship took its rightful place in political and constitutional history on January 5, 2021, where it will remain forever."

This occurred after former President Donald Trump pressured his Vice President Michael Pence to “be like Jefferson” during the days before and on the morning of the coup. Trump argued, following John C. Eastman's memos, that Pence could refuse to count some states’ electoral ballots. On the morning of January 6, 2021, Pence refused, crediting Judge Luttig, who advised Pence that there was no historical precedent for refusing to count any electoral votes.

== Publications & Media ==
- “Entailing Aristocracy in Colonial Virginia, ‘Ancient Feudal Restraints’ and Revolutionary Reform,” William and Mary Quarterly, 1997.
- By Birth or Consent: Children, Law, & the Anglo-American Revolution in Authority (UNC Press for the Institute of Early American History and Culture, 2005).
- "The Transformation of Domestic Law.” Christopher Tomlins & Michael Grossberg, eds., The Cambridge History of Law in America 1 (2008): 288-323.
- Interview about By Birth or Consent for the Society for the History of Childhood and Youth with Ryan Patrick (posted April, 2015)
- “Slavery, Sovereignty, and “Inheritable Blood”: Reconsidering John Locke and the Origins of American Slavery,” The American Historical Review,” Volume 122, Issue 4, October 2017, pp. 1038–1078.
- “Slavery-Entangled Philosophy: Does Locke’s Entanglement with Slavery Undermine his Philosophy?” AEON, September 12, 2018.
- “Salutary Neglect? Reconsidering Empire” for College Board Advanced Placement in US History, filmed October 2020, released via YouTube in November 2020 to AP students (one of a series of 8 lectures).
- "Creating a Common Law of Slavery for England and its New World Empire," Law and History Review, 39(4), 765-834, 2021. doi:10.1017/S0738248021000407
  - Available earlier on SSRN as "Creating a Common Law of Slavery for England and its Empire," (October 14, 2014). Paper Presented at the Yale Legal History Forum, October 2014. ssrn.3828635
- “Race & the Enlightenment: The Story of a Slander” Liberties Journal 2 (2021)
- “No, Thomas Jefferson didn’t Rig the Vote Count,” Washington Monthly, January 5, 2021.
- “More on that Jefferson Nonsense,” Backbencher, January 5, 2021.
- “Can Trump’s Pardons Be Reversed” with Timothy Noah, Washington Monthly, January 22, 2021.
- "Why Impeaching a Former President Wouldn’t have Surprised the Founders” Washington Monthly, February 4, 2021
- “The Divine Right of Wingnuts,” Washington Monthly, March 23, 2021.
- “How to Cure College’s Adjunct Addiction,” Washington Monthly, August 4, 2021.
- “Hearing Nat Turner: Within the 1831 Slave Rebellion,” Law & Social Inquiry 46(3), August 2021, 910–916.

== See also ==
- List of historians
- List of historians by area of study
