= Alice Ross =

American culinary historian

Dr. Alice S. Ross (September 28, 1930 – December 7, 2020) was an American culinary historian, consultant, and author.

== Background and career ==
Alice Ross was born on September 28, 1930 and grew up in Brooklyn.

Ross began her hands-on food history classes in 1976 with the United States Bicentennial.

Ross was a co-founder of Culinary Historians of New York and a member of the International Association of Culinary Professionals. In 1988, she opened Alice Ross Hearth Studios in Smithtown, New York, offering food and history courses with a focus on hearth cooking. Ross served as consultant to historic sites including Colonial Williamsburg and Lowell National Historical Park.

Ross received a doctorate from Stony Brook University in 1996, with her dissertation titled Women, Work and Cookery, Suffolk County, Long Island, New York, 1880-1920. She taught at colleges including Queens College, City University of New York, City College of New York, Hofstra University, and New York University.

Ross was married to a veterinarian and had four children. She died on December 7, 2020.

The Alice Ross Culinary Ephemera Collection is housed at Virginia Tech.

== Selected publications ==
- Health and Diet in 19th-Century America: A Food Historian's Point of View (1993)
- Women, Work and Cookery, Suffolk County, Long Island, New York, 1880-1920 (1996)
- A Taste of Brookhaven, 400 Years of History in the Kitchen (2005)
