= David Lloyd Dusenbury =

American philosopher and author

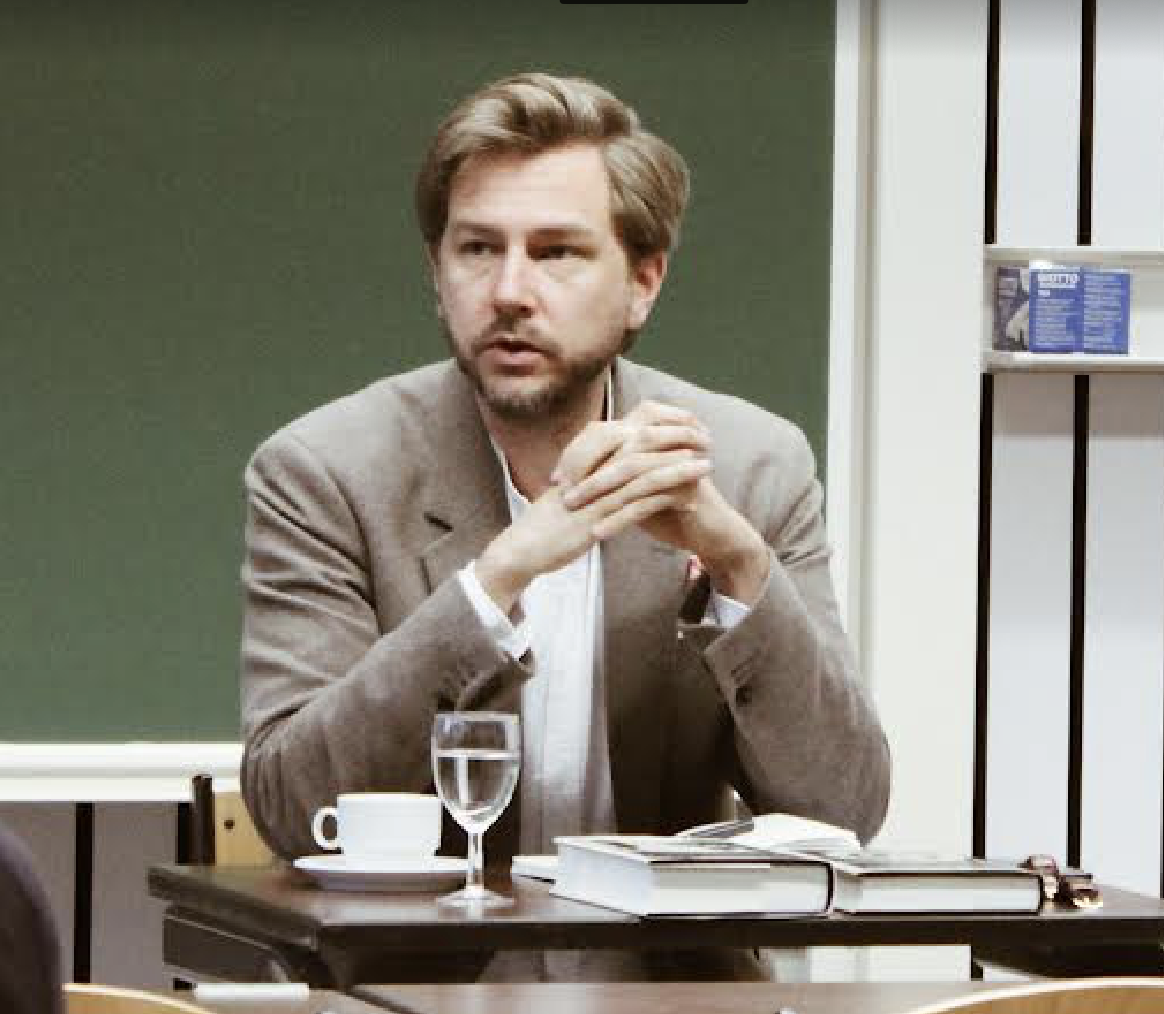
- Education: Hebrew University of Jerusalem
- Occupations: Philosopher, historian of ideas
- Website: https://dldusenbury.com

David Lloyd Dusenbury is a philosopher and historian of ideas. He obtained his doctorate in philosophy from Katholieke Universiteit Leuven in 2017, and later held a postdoctoral fellowship at the Hebrew University of Jerusalem.

From August 2024, he was made Associate Professor of Humanities at the University of Florida.

== Career ==
From 2021 to 2024, Dusenbury was a Senior Fellow at the Danube Institute.

In 2022, he was also Visiting Professor at Vita-Salute San Raffaele University in Milan. In 2022-23, he held a Joint Chair at the University of Antwerp. And in 2023 - 2024, he was Visiting Professor at Eötvös Loránd University in Budapest.

Dusenbury is the author of five books. The first, The Space of Time, was published in 2014, under the pseudonym David van Dusen.

He has lectured widely in Europe, Asia, Australia, and the United States.

== Books ==
Writing for The International Journal of the Platonic Tradition, Josef Lössl considered The Space of Time to be "highly erudite and enthusiastically written", and "a fine new study on Augustine’s concept of time in Confessions, which should be heeded by all who take an interest in the philosophical study of time".

His second, Platonic Legislations, discusses how Plato, one the fiercest legal critics in ancient Greece, "became – in the longue durée – its most influential legislator". The Journal of Hellenic Studies noted that Platonic Legislations "proposes a number of interesting ideas" and suggests "novel line[s] of interpretation".

In 2021's The Innocence of Pontius Pilate, Dusenbury revisits the question of the Roman governor Pilate's culpability in the death of Jesus, and how it had subsequently been interpreted by scripture and scholars. He argues that Jesus' interrogation by Pilate, and Augustine of Hippo's North African sermon on that trial, led to the concept of secularity and the logic of tolerance emerging in early modern Europe. For The Independent, David Keys considered The Innocence of Pontius Pilate "a groundbreaking book".

In Bryn Mawr Classical Review, James O'Donnell, Arizona State University asserted that Nemesius of Emesa on Human Nature is a book in which “Dusenbury inhabits Nemesius’s text and his world with a scholarly imagination that lets him flesh out a consistent and provocative representation of what Nemesius was getting at and how it made him distinctive”.

In 2022's I Judge No One: A Political Life Of Jesus, Dusenbury embarked on a philosophical reading of the four gospels, concluding that Jesus was 'a benign revolutionary'. Dusenbury suggests that Jesus offered his contemporaries "a scandalous double claim. First, that human judgements are pervasive and deceptive; and second, that even divine laws can only be fulfilled in the human experience of love".

Reviewing for The Spectator, Nick Spencer found I Judge No One to be "learned and engaging", while the religious historian and podcaster Tom Holland said: "I can’t think of a book that has made the Gospels seem as fresh and strange to me as this one does."

== Bibliography ==
- The Space of Time (Brill, 2014).
- Platonic Legislations (Springer, 2017).
- The Innocence of Pontius Pilate (Hurst & Company, 2021).
- Nemesius of Emesa on Human Nature (Oxford University Press, 2021)
- I Judge No One (Hurst & Company, 2022 and Oxford University Press, 2023)
