= Jan Glete =

Swedish historian (1947–2009)

Jan Glete (1 September 1947 – 13 July 2009) was a Swedish historian. He was professor of history at Stockholm University, specializing in 20th-century Swedish industry and banking as well as the connection between state formation and naval history in early modern Europe.

== Academic career ==
Glete spent his entire academic career at Stockholm University, where he had taken his bachelor's degree and where he defended his doctoral thesis Kreugerkoncernen och Boliden in 1975.

Having been born in Västerås, Sweden, where his father was employed by ASEA, he went on to write the history of this corporation. Glete also developed a passionate interest in maritime history, which he combined with an interest in the state-building process in the early modern period, publishing several books on this topic in English using a comparative perspective.

He served as vice-chairman of Sjöhistoriska Samfundet from 1993 until his death from cancer at the age of 61 in July 2009, Stockholm, Sweden. He was survived by his wife Sang Kum Yeo and daughter Jihi.

== Published works ==
- Kreugerkoncernen och Boliden (Stockholm, 1975).
- Kreugerkoncernen och krisen på svensk aktiemarknad: [The Kreuger group and the crisis on the Swedish stock market]: studier om svenskt och internationellt riskkapital under mellankrigstiden. (Stockholm, 1981).
- Kustförsvar och teknisk omvandling: teknik, doktriner och organisation inom svenskt kustförsvar 1850-1880. (Stockholm, 1985).
- Asea under hundra år: 1883-1983: en studie i ett storföretags organisatoriska, tekniska och ekonomiska utveckling. (Västerås, 1987).
- Ägande och industriell omvandling: ägargrupper, skogsindustri, verkstadsindustri 1850-1950. (Stockholm, 1987).
- Navies and nations: warships, navies and state building in Europe and America, 1500-1860. 2 volumes. (Stockholm, 1993).
- Nätverk i näringslivet: ägande och industriell omvandling i det mogna industrisamhället 1920-1990 (Stockholm, 1994).
- Regioner, nätverk, storföretag och grupper - något om mesonivån i finans- och företagshistorisk forskning (Stockholm, 1995)
- Warfare at sea, 1500-1650: Maritime conflicts and the transformation of Europe. (London, 2000).
- War and the state in early modern Europe: Spain, the Dutch Republic and Sweden as fiscal-military states, 1500-1600. (London, 2002).
- Svensk historia under vattnet: vrak i Östersjön berättar by Alexej Smirnov; translated by Sergej Gratchev; fackgranskning: Jan Glete och Elisabeth Löfstrand]. (Stockholm, 2002).
- Swedish Naval Administration 1521-1721: Resource Flows and Organizational Capabilities. (Leiden and Boston: 2010)
- Contributor to the Oxford Encyclopedia of Maritime History, 2007:
  - "Baltic Sea: An Overview"
  - "Baltic Sea: Regional Navies"
  - "Frigate"
  - "Karlskrona"
  - "Mediterranean Sea: Regional Navies"
  - "Naval Administration"
  - "Navies, Great Powers: An Overview"
  - "Ship-of-the-Line"
  - "Svensksund, Battle of"
  - "Warships: Early Modern Warships"
- Contributor of several important articles published in the Swedish periodical Forum Navale:
  - "Svenska örlogsfartyg, 1521-1560: Flottans grundläggning under ett tekniskt brytn ingsskede," Forum Navale, nr 30 (1976)
  - "Svenska örlogsfartyg, 1521-1560," Forum Navale, nr 31 (1977)
  - "Den Svenska Linjeflottan 1721-1860," Forum Navale, nr 45 (1990)
  - "Johan III:s Stora Skepp", Forum Navale, nr. 49 (1993)
  - "Hur Stor var Vasa?", Forum Navale, nr 51 (1995)

== Sources ==
- Death announcement by Stockholm University
- Obituary. Forum Navale, nr. 66 2010, pp. 8–11.
