= Julia Pavón =

Historian and Professor

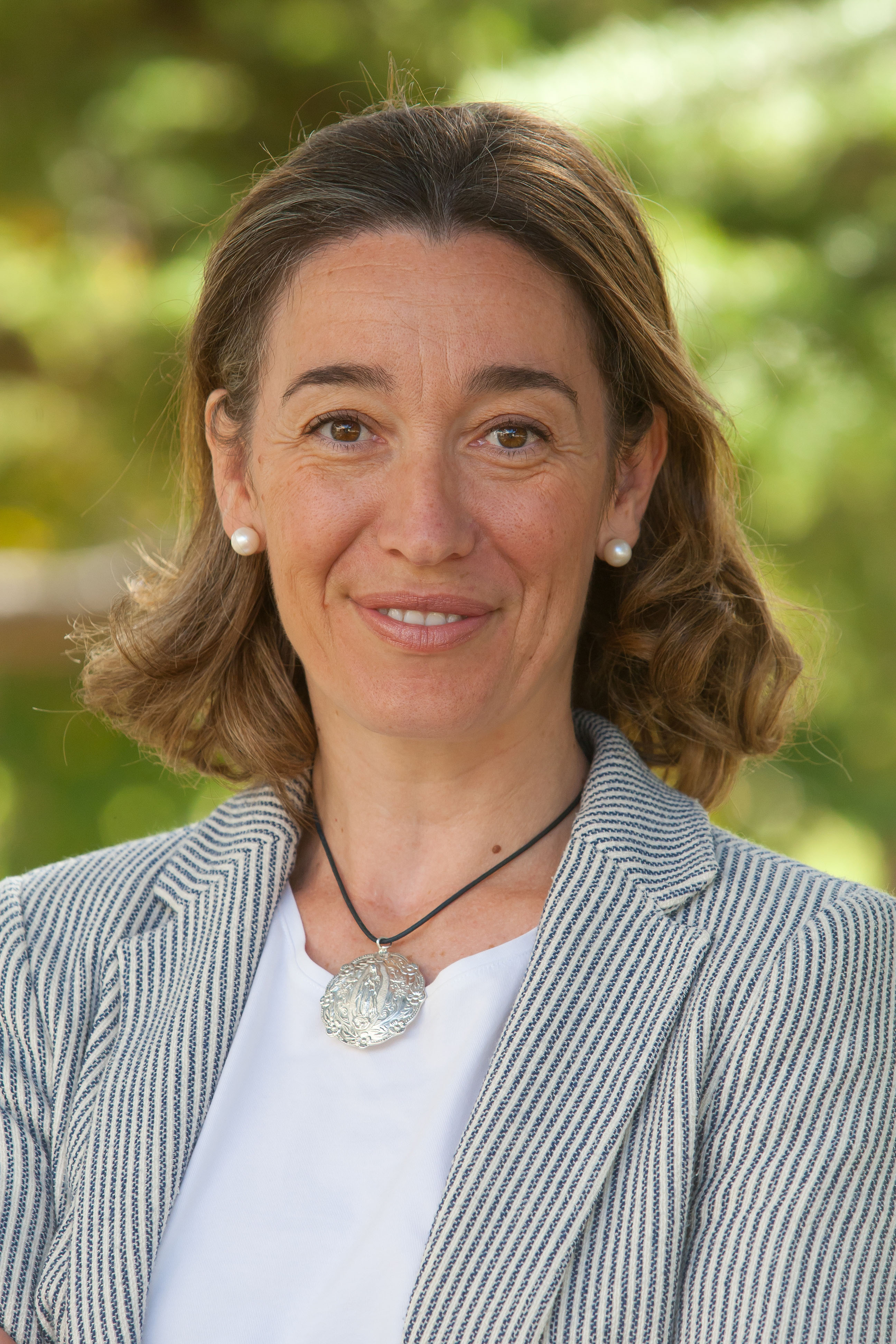
- in 2019
- Born: 1968 (age 57–58); Madrid
- Education: University of Zargoza; University of Navarra
- Occupations: Professor and Vice Dean
- Employer: University of Navarra
- Known for: Medieval history of Navarra

Julia Pavón or Julia Pavón Benito (born 1968) is a Spanish historian and Professor of Medieval History at the University of Navarra in Pamplona.

== Life ==
Pavón was born in 1968 in Madrid. In 1991 she obtained her first degree in history and geography from the University of Zaragoza. She obtained her doctorate at the University of Navarra in 1996 with Ángel Martín Duque as her supervisor. She is a full Professor of Medieval History in that university's Department of History, Art History and Geography. In 2012 she became the director of that department until in 2019 she was promoted to be the Vice Dean of Academic Planning of Philosophy and Letters.

She has studied the attitudes, representations and experiences of the medieval people before their death. In 1985 she wrote and published the book Silencio tengan en claustra : monacato femenino en la Navarra medieval.

Pavón collaborates with the University of Barcelona's Claustra project . Atlas of female spirituality in the Middle Ages . This project was born in 2004 with the aim of cataloging and geographically positioning the monasteries of medieval women, existing from the beginning of the Middle Ages until the middle of the 16th century. As a result of this collaboration, "Silence keep in claustra. Monacato feminine in medieval Navarra", a cartography of the female Navarrese monacatos has been published.

== Works ==
- Silencio tengan en claustra : monacato femenino en la Navarra medieval, 1985
