= Alphonse Balleydier =

Baron Alphonse Victor Chrétien Balleydier (15 January 1810, Lyon – 10 November 1859, Lyon) was a 19th-century French man of letters, historian and historiographer.

== Publications ==
- Nouvelles lyonnaises (1843) Read online
- Les Bords du Rhône, de Lyon à la mer, chroniques et Légendes (1843)
- Histoire politique et militaire du peuple de Lyon pendant la Révolution française (1789-1795) (3 volumes, 1845-1846)
- Rome et Pie IX (1847)
- Histoire de la garde mobile depuis les barricades de février. Avec l'état nominatif des officiers de chaque bataillon, ainsi que la liste complète des morts et des blessés victimes des 4 journées de juin (1848)
- La Première Légion à Cherbourg. Impressions de voyage (1848)
- Turin et Charles-Albert (1848) Read online
- Histoire de la garde républicaine (1848)
- Le Couvent et la caserne des Célestins (1849) Read online
- Dieu ne le veut pas, ou les Révolutionnaires peints par eux-mêmes (1849) à Read online
- Visite rendue par l'Angleterre à la France ou Une semaine à Paris pendant les vacances de Pâques (1849)
- La vérité sur les affaires de Naples, Réfutations des lettres de Monsieur Gladstone (1851)
- Histoire de la Révolution de Rome, tableau religieux, politique et militaire des années 1846, 1847, 1848, 1849 et 1850 en Italie (2 volumes, 1851)
- Histoire des révolutions de l'Empire d'Autriche, années 1848 et 1849 (1853)
- Histoire de la guerre de Hongrie en 1848-1849, pour faire suite à l'Histoire des révolutions de l'Empire d'Autriche (1853)
- Veillées de famille (1855)
- Veillées maritimes (1856)
- Histoire de l'Empereur Nicolas (trente années de règne) (2 volumes, 1857)
- Histoire de Sainte Gudule et du Saint Sacrement du Miracle (1859)
- Veillées de vacances (1859)
- Veillées du presbytère (1860)
- Veillées du peuple (1862) Read online
- Une Promenade historique (1863)
- Histoire d'un œuf de Pâques (1876)
- Le Petit Chaperon blanc (1876)
- Récits du foyer (1876) Read online
- Valeria ou les premiers chrétiens et autres histoires (1890)
