= Hélène Antoniadis-Bibicou =

French-Greek historian (1923–2017)

Hélène Antoniadis-Bibicou (8 July 1923, in Athens – 13 June 2017, in Athens) was a French-Greek historian, specialising in Byzantine and Balkan history. She was invested with the Ordre des Palmes académiques in 2007, and the Order of Beneficence in 2012.
