= Julia P. Gelardi =

American historian

- Education: Simon Fraser University
- Occupation: Author
- Writing career
- Language: (United States) English
- Period: 2005–present
- Genre: Royal history
- Website: www.juliapgelardi.com

Julia P. Gelardi is an author of European royal history. She is an independent historian.

== Writing career ==
After Gelardi received her Master of Arts degree from Simon Fraser University, she began her writing career by focusing on European royalty. She has published three books focusing on this subject: Born to Rule concerns five reigning granddaughters of Queen Victoria, In Triumph's Wake focuses on three pairs of royal mothers and daughters, and From Splendor to Revolution describes the lives of four Romanov women towards the end of the Imperial Russian Empire.

On From Splendor to Revolution, Publishers Weekly wrote that Gelardi "ably weaves in the extended family ties that connected most European rulers... while also including helpful genealogy charts. Gelardi's narrative framework of the four Romanov women’s long lives works well to explain not only the realities of the European courts and alliances but also the unique aspects of the Russian dynasty." The San Francisco Chronicle called the book "ambitious and knowledgeable", but believed her research to be unoriginal as it drew from already-existing scholarship.

== Personal life ==
Gelardi was raised in Florida, and has resided in Miami, Toronto, Phoenix, and Vancouver. She currently lives in Minnesota with her husband and two daughters.

== Works ==
- Born to Rule: Five Reigning Consorts, Granddaughters of Queen Victoria (2005)
- In Triumph's Wake: Royal Mothers, Tragic Daughters, and the Price They Paid for Glory (2008)
- From Splendor to Revolution: The Romanov Women, 1847–1928 (2011)
