= D. M. Schurman =

Canadian naval historian and professor

Donald Mackenzie Schurman (September 2, 1924 in Sydney, Nova Scotia – June 16, 2013 in Kingston, Ontario) was a Canadian naval historian. He was a professor of history at Queen's University, Kingston, Ontario, and also served at the Royal Military College of Canada. In the Festschrift published in his honor in 1997, the editors hailed Schurman as the "founder of the serious study of naval history in Canada".

== Early life and education ==
The son of Bertrand Lloyd Schurman, a civil servant and veteran of the First World War, and his wife, Mabel P. Mackenzie, Schurman lived a relatively quiet childhood. That would change when he joined the Royal Canadian Air Force and became a flying officer in 1945. He served in 429 “Bison” Squadron participating in night raids over Germany, serving as a wireless operator and gunner. After demobilisation, he attended Acadia University, where he earned his bachelor of arts degree in 1949. Going on to graduate studies at Sidney Sussex College, Cambridge, he completed his Ph.D. in history in 1955 with a thesis on Imperial defence, 1868–1887.

== Career ==
Schurman began his work as a historian of the British Empire, but this topic became unpopular as a scholarly subject so Schurman translated his interest in imperial history to naval history. His 1965 book 'The Education of a Navy: The Development of British Naval Strategic Thought, 1867-1914' (London: Cassell, 1965), focused on the development of strategic thinking in the Royal Navy, creating a new approach to the subject that linked naval thinkers and their personalities with British imperial naval policy and strategy. It also resurrected the memory of British naval historian Sir John Knox Laughton. He followed this with a biography of the important strategic naval thinker Sir Julian Corbett. Schurman's research on this subject had a profound effect on the study of naval history in Canada, and influenced a new generation of naval historians in both the United States and the United Kingdom.

In 1972, Schurman joined with John Matthews, professor of English at Queen's University to start a search for the letters of Benjamin Disraeli as a sabbatical project. Their success in tracking down many previously undiscovered manuscript letters led to the establishment in 1975 of the Disraeli Project. They were joined in their effort by Professor J. A. W. Gunn, head of the Political Science Department at Queen's. Professor Matthews was appointed senior editor, and Schurman joined in editing the first two volumes of the project. When the funding ended, after the first two volumes, the project became dormant, but has since then continued on the foundation that Matthews and Schurman initially laid.

== Published works ==
- Catalogue of the Corbett papers, compiled by Brian Tunstall; assisted by Peter M. Stanford and D.M. Schurman. (1958)
- The Education of a Navy: The Development of British Naval Strategic Thought, 1867-1914. (University of Chicago Press, 1965) read online
- Julian S. Corbett, 1854-1922 : Historian of British Maritime Policy from Drake to Jellicoe. (1981)
- Benjamin Disraeli Letters, Volume One: 1815–1834, ed. J. A. W. Gunn, John Matthews, Donald M. Schurman, and M. G. Wiebe (1982).
- Benjamin Disraeli Letters, Volume Two: 1835–1837, ed. J. A. W. Gunn, John Matthews, Donald M. Schurman, and M. G. Wiebe (1982).
- A Bishop and his People: John Travers Lewis and the Anglican Diocese of Ontario, 1862-1902. (1991)
- Imperial Defence, 1868-1887 ¨by Donald Mackenzie Schurman; edited by John Beeler. (2000)

== Contributions ==
- A. M. J. Hyatt, ed., From Dreadnought to Polaris (1973)
- 'Historians and Britain's Imperial Strategic Stance in 1914', in John E. Flint and Glyndwr Williams, eds. Perspectives of Empire: Essays Presented to Gerald S. Graham, (1973)
- Gerald Tulchinsky, ed., To Preserve and Defend (1976)
- Gerald Jordan, ed., Warfare in the Twentieth Century. (1977)
- 'Julian Corbett's Influence on the Royal Navy's Perception of its Maritime Function,' in James Goldrick and John Hattendorf eds., Mahan is Not Enough: The Proceedings of a Conference on the Works of Sir Julian Corbett and Admiral Sir Herbert Richmond (1993)
- 'Introduction' by John Hattendorf and D. M. Schurman' in Julian S. Corbett, Maritime Operations in the Russo-Japanese War, 1904-05. (1994)
- 'Imperial Naval Defence: The and Now' in K. Neilson and E.J. Errington, eds., Navies and Global Defence (1995)

== Festschrift ==
- Far-flung lines: essays in imperial defence in honour of Donald Mackenzie Schurman, edited by Greg Kennedy and Keith Neilson. (1997)
