= Lev Kublanov =

Russian-American painter

- Born: September 9, 1946 (age 79); Moscow, Russia
- Known for: Drawing

Lev Kublanov (born September 9, 1946) is a modern Russian-American graphic artist. His works are primarily in the realism style, though sometimes with elements of the magic realism. His main subjects are landscapes, still life, and portraits using pen and ink, charcoal, pencil, sepia, gouache and watercolor.

== Life and work ==
Lev Kublanov was born in Moscow, Russia, and spent his childhood in a historic neighborhood near the Red Square. He graduated from the Moscow Architectural Institute in 1972; he consequently worked for 20 years in various Moscow architectural design firms and became a member of the Architects’ Union of the USSR. He has been a member of the International Union of Architects since 1981. In 1985, tired of designing monotonous mass-apartment buildings and offices, Kublanov left architecture to become a graphic artist. Since then, he has participated in personal and group exhibitions in Russia, Western Europe, and USA. His works can be found in private collections all over the world, including Russia, Austria, Hungary, Germany, USA, Israel, Italy, Poland, France and Japan.

While in Moscow, Kublanov's work captured the ancient Moscow spirit, mirroring the reality of the old city: ancient courtyards, quiet streets, and the feeling of everyday life. Kublanov's architectural background gives his work a precision, clearly articulated composition, and the illusion of distance. He does not strive for generalization or for the abstract rather, he allows his emotions and observations to develop a poetic image of his subject. His landscapes are uninhabited but one senses their human creator. His work strikes a responsive chord in all people who find their world being destroyed by modern technology.

In 1998, Lev Kublanov and his family moved to Chicago. Being invited to southwest Michigan, he created a series of drawings and watercolors for Schuler’s Restaurant in Stevensville, MI.

== Exhibitions ==
Moscow, Russia

- 1987, 1993 State Central Library
- 1987 Cultural Center on Volhonka Street
- 1988, 1992 Nekrasov’s Library
- 1988, 1995, 1997 Central House of Architects
- 1990 Art Center on Kuznetsky
- 1997 Hotel «Ukraina»
- 1997 «Peresvetov Pereulok» Gallery
- 1998 Moscow Division of IBM
- 1996, 1998 Central House of Journalists
- 1998 Center for Liberal Democracy

France

- Permanent Exhibition at Art Gallery «Mareschall», Paris

Germany

- 1994 Gallery «Eckes», Nieder-Olm

Austria

- Permanent Exhibition at Cultural Center of Mondsee
- 1991, 1992 Gallery «Forum», Wels
- 1993, 1994, 1997, 1999 Gallery of Bank, Kirchdorf

United States

- 1998, 1999 Lincoln Terrace Art Studio & Gallery, Skokie, IL
- 2000 MILLENNIUM Art Gallery, Libertyville, IL
- 2001 CURTIS FRAME Back Alley Gallery, Libertyville, IL
- 2000, 2001 The Rose Gallery, Chicago, IL
- 2008 UBU Fine Art Gallery, Chicago, IL
