= Gordon Wright (historian) =

American historian

Gordon Wright (April 24, 1912 – January 11, 2000) was an American historian. He focused on modern European history and was the pre-eminent historian on modern French history. He has been recognized nationally and internationally for his work and his method of teaching.

== Career ==
Gordon Wright received his B.A. at Whitman College in Walla Walla, Washington, in 1933. Later in 1957, his alma mater awarded him an honorary degree. In 1939, he completed his Ph.D. at Stanford University and wrote his dissertation on Raymond Poincaré and the French Presidency. A copy of his revised dissertation was published by Stanford University Press in 1942.

Immediately after graduating from college, Wright began working as a junior high school teacher. Later, he became a teaching fellow at George Washington University from 1936 to 1937. Then from 1939 to 1943, he began teaching history at the University of Oregon. He left to be a specialist at the U.S. State Department from 1943 to 1944. Late in 1944, Wright led a convoy of vehicles and personnel from Lisbon to Paris to bring reinforcements to the newly reopened embassy, while the fighting was still going on. Afterward, he was told by the State official who gave him this assignment that he was not expected to complete his mission. He stayed in France as a US Foreign Service officer at the embassy in Paris for two years after the war. In 1947, he returned to the University of Oregon as the History Department Chair until 1957.

Wright was hired as a full professor at Stanford University, serving as the executive head of the history department from 1959 to 1965; however he also taught at University of Washington, Northwestern University, Arizona State University, and at the College of William and Mary. His position at Stanford was quite an accomplishment since Stanford University does not usually hire its graduates as professors. Wright returned to Paris for a short time as the cultural attaché in 1967 and stayed until 1969, but decided once again to teach at Stanford University. He was an Associate Dean of Humanities and Sciences from 1970 to 1973, held the William H. Bonsall Professorship of History from 1970 until 1977, served on the Faculty Senate for more than five years, and received the Dinkelspiel award for service to undergraduate education in 1975. Wright retired in 1977 to, as he explained, make room for his successors.

== Personal life ==
Wright was born on April 24, 1912, in Lynden, Washington. His family was traditionally school teachers, farmers and preachers and had lived in North America since the 1630s. His great-grandfather was a part of the gold rush in California but, like many, did not find the treasure for which he was searching. Wright once stated, "My family has never had the knack of making money."

While working in France, Wright began his own family. On August 17, 1940, he married his wife, Louise Aiken. In an article appearing in Perspectives in April 2000, Peter Stansky, Paul Robinson, and Gordon Craig said, "Gordon and Louise were an inseparable couple; she greatly enriched the life of the History Department and of the Stanford community." Together, they had five sons: Eric, Michael, Philip, David, and Gregory. Tragedy struck the family when in 1965 Gregory died of leukemia. Wright and his wife would go on to become the grandparents of six children.

Wright was a committed liberal. In 1961, he protested the United States embargo against Cuba and later became an outspoken opponent of the Vietnam War. Though he espoused challenging views in public, in his personal life he did not believe in forcing his views on others and he made it a habit of not giving his opinion unless it was asked of him. He was known to be a reserved and modest person, so much so that his colleagues planned his retirement event to honor his accomplishments in secret. Wright died on January 11, 2000, at the age of 87 from complications with diabetes.

== History as a "moral science" ==
Wright was well known for promoting what he termed moral science, which was also the theme of his presidential address in an annual meeting of the American Historical Association in 1975. Throughout his career, Wright argued that "intense moral ambiguity" lay at the root of nearly all the man-made misfortunes of the twentieth century, and he always raised the question of what role morality has in the field of history. Wright believed that data-driven, morally neutral interpretations of history were breaking the field's connection to humanity: "True, we have clothed our conduct in attractive garb: we speak of detachment, open-mindedness, tolerance, understanding. But beneath theses euphemisms, the critics say, abdication [from teaching morality] is the essential reality."

Deploring the vacuity of modern historical studies, Wright argued that the field needed to be recast as moral science:

The central goal is to encourage [students] to read, reflect, and argue about some sensitive issues associated with modern war. For example, can one distinguish just from unjust wars? Are there moral constraints in wartime on soldiers, statesmen, citizens? Do men fight because they are innately aggressive, or because they are socially conditioned to do so? Are modern wars purely destructive, or are they locomotives of history, that speed up technological development and social change? My role in all this is to set the agenda and then to prod and provoke when necessary – definitely not to hand down obiter dicta.

Though his belief in moral science has not been adopted by the greater community of historians, he retains the respected reputation that he enjoyed among his contemporaries.

== Memberships and honors ==
- Member of the American Academy of Arts and Sciences
- Member of the American Philosophical Society
- Foreign honorary member of the French Academy of Moral and Political Sciences in Paris
- Honored as Commandeur de l'Ordre des Arts et des Lettres by the French government in the 1960s
- Commander in the French Order of Arts and Letters
- President of the Society for French Historical Studies
- President of the American Historical Association in 1975

== Works ==
- The Reshaping of French democracy. Introduced by Paul Birdsall (1948)
- France in Modern Times: 1760 to the Present (1960)
- France in Modern Times: From the Enlightenment to the Present 5th ed. (c1995)
- The Rise of Modern Europe: The Ordeal of Total War, 1939–1945 (1968)
- Between the Guillotine and Liberty: Two Centuries of the Crime Problem in France (1983)
- Notable or Notorious (1989)
- France in the Twentieth Century (c1965)
- An Age of Controversy: Discussion Problems in Twentieth Century European history, edited by Gordon Wright and Arthur Mejia Jr. Alternate ed. (1973)
- Insiders and Outliers: The Individual in History (c1981)
- The Transformation of Modern France: Essays in Honor of Gordon Wright, edited by William B. Cohen (c1997)
- Raymond Poincaré and the French Presidency (1942)
- Rural Revolution in France: The Peasantry in the Twentieth Century (1964)
- Agrarian Syndicalism in Postwar France (June 1953)
- Ambassador Bullitt and the Fall of France (October 1957)
- Catholics and Peasantry in France (December 1953)
- Economic Conditions in the Confederacy as Seen by the French Consuls (May 1941)
- Peasant Politics in the Third French Republic (March 1955)
- Reflections on the French Resistance: 1940–1944 (September 1962)
- Reparation at the Paris Peace Conference, and Political economy versus National Sovereignty: Comment (March 1979)
- The Anti-Commune: Paris, 1871 (Spring 1977)
- The Origins of Napoleon III's Free Trade (November 1938)
- The Resurgence of the Right in France (1955)
