= Willard L. King =

American lawyer and historian (1893–1981)

Willard Leroy King (1893 – 1981) was an American lawyer and historian known for his scholarly work on Abraham Lincoln. He was the author of two biographical books: one about Melville Fuller and one about David Davis. A graduate of the University of Chicago, King was a senior partner at the law firm King, Robin, Gale & Pillinger. At the time of his death, King was writing a book to be titled Lincoln the Lawyer.
