= Gabriela Dudeková =

Slovak historian

Gabriela Dudeková (born 1968 in Hurbanovo) is a Slovak historian.

== Biography ==
Dudeková lives and works in Bratislava, Nitra (Slovakia) and Houston, Texas, USA. She has a degree in history from the Comenius University in Bratislava (1991). She completed her PhD degree in 2001 with the dissertation "Social policy of Hungary in late 19th and early 20th century and the social reform work of Georg Schulpe". She prepared the Slovak part of the Comparative non-profit sector project of Johns Hopkins University, Baltimore. Dudeková works in the Institute of Historical Studies of Slovak Academy of Sciences. She is an author of articles and papers, co-author and author of the books. She regularly contributes to the topics of her interest on the scientific conferences in Slovakia and other European countries. She is the leader of VEGA project The opportunities for the professional and social accomplishment of women in the modern history.

Her study concentrates on social policy of Hungary in 1868–1918, situation of prisoners of war, propaganda and the life of civilians in World War I, social care and social situation in the area of Slovakia in the 19th century until 1918, gender studies and history of feminism.

== Awards ==
In 2005, she was awarded the Moritz Csaky Award by the Austrian Academy of Sciences.

== Main works ==
- 1991 – Sociológ Juraj Schulpe a jeho činnosť. Príspevok k sociálnym dejinám. (Diplomová práca) (Slovak for 'Sociologist Juraj Schulpe and his work. A contribution to the social history (Theses)') Comenius University 1991.
- 1994 – Juraj Schulpe, Vedec a humanista (Slovak for 'Juraj Schulpe, Scientist and humanist'), Bratislava, YMCA 1994.
- 1997 – Słowacki ruch narodowy w kontekście procesów narodowotwórczych w Europie (Slovak for 'Slovak national movement in the context of nationalist processes in Europe'), In: Fenomen nowoczesnego nacjonalizmu w Europie Środkowej, pod red. Bernarda Linka, Jorga Lüera, Kaia Struvego, Opole 1997 ISBN 83-7126-096-2
- 1997 – Z minulosti združovania na Slovensku, historické pozadie tretieho sektoru (Slovak for 'From the History of Associations in Slovakia, Historical Background of the Third Sector'), The Johns Hopkins Comparative Nonprofit Sector Project, Bratislava: SPACE (working paper), 1997
- 1998 – Dobrovoľné združovanie na Slovensku v minulosti (Slovak for 'Voluntary organization is in Slovak history'). SPACE Bratislava, 1998.
- 1999 – Sociálne aspekty vojnového hospodárstva (Slovak for 'Social aspects of the war economy'). In: Podrimavský M., Kováč D. (Ed.).: Slovensko na začiatku 20. storočia. Historický Ústav SAV, Bratislava 1999.
- 2002 – Die Slowakei – ein Fokus für transnationale Geschichtsforschung? (German for 'Slovakia - Focus on trans-national historic research?'), AHF Munich, 2002.
- 2003 – Sozialgeschichte in der Slowakei – Eine Bilanz und neue Impulse (German for 'Social History in Slovakia, An account and the new impulses'), in: Bohemia 44 (2003) 2. Zeitschrift für Geschichte und Kultur der böhmischen Länder. Collegium Carolinum, Berlin 2003.
- 2004 – Sociálne dejiny 19. a 20. storočia na Slovensku (Slovak for 'Social History of 19th and 20th Century in Slovakia') In: Historický časopis, year 52/2, Bratislava 2004
- 2007 – Der 'barmherzige Wohltäter' und der 'bedürftige Arme'. Stereotypen der Armut und Wohltätigkeit im 19. und am Anfang des 20. Jahrhunderts (German for 'The warm-hearted patron and the needy poor. Stereotypes of the poverty and charity in the 19th and early 20th Centuries'), In: Hahn, Hans Henning, Mannová, Elena (Ed.): Nationale Wahrnehmungen und ihre Stereotypisierung. Frankfurt am Main, Berlin, Bern, Bruxelles, New York, Oxford, Wien, 2007 ISBN 978-3-631-50445-1
- 2007 – Vojenská cenzúra korešpondencie. Niekoľko úvah o vzťahu armády a spoločnosti za prvej svetovej vojny (Slovak for 'Military censorship of correspondence'), In Miles Semper Honestus. Zborník štúdií vydaný pri príležitosti životného jubilea Vojtecha Dangla. Vladimír Segeš, Božena Šeďová, Editori. - Bratislava, Vojenský historický ústav, 2007, s. 125–135. ISBN 978-80-969375-3-0.
- 2007 – Stravovanie a zásobovanie mesta za prvej svetovej vojny (Slovak for 'Alimentation and food supply in a city during the Great War'), In Dobrou chuť velkoměsto. Sborník příspěvků z 23. mezinárodní konference Archivu hlavního města Prahy. XXV.Documenta Pragensia. Fejtová, O. - Ledvinka, V. - Pešek, J. - Praha, Archiv hlavního města Prahy - Scriptorium, 2007, pp. 123–142. ISBN 978-80-86197-85-2
- 2008 – Międzynarodowa działalnośc kobiet w Austro-Węgrzech i VII Kongres Międzynarodowego Stowarzyszenia na Rzecz Praw Wyborczych Kobiet w Budapeszcie w 1913 roku (Polish for 'International activities of women in Austro-Hungary and the 7th Congress of International Women's Suffrage Alliance in Budapest'), 1913 Preklad do poľštiny Karol Hollý. In Działaczki społeczne, feministki, obywatelki... Samoorganizowanie się kobiet na ziemiach polskich do 1918 roku (na tle porównawczym). Redakcja Agnieszka Janiak-Jasińska, Katarzyna Sierakowska, Andrzej Szwarc. 1.vyd. - Warszawa, Instytut Historyczny Universytetu Warszawskiego, 2008, s. 147–169. ISBN 978-83-7543-026-4.
- 2009 – Rodová identita v historickej perspektíve (Slovak for 'Gender identity in the historical perspective') DUDEKOVÁ, Gabriela - LENGYELOVÁ, Tünde. In My a tí druhí v modernej spoločnosti: konštrukcie a transformácie kolektívnych identít. - Bratislava, Veda, Historický ústav SAV, Ústav etnológie SAV, 2009, s. 44–85. ISBN 978-80-224-1025-0
- 2009 – Stratégie prežitia v mimoriadnej situácii. Vplyv Veľkej vojny na rodinu na území Slovenska (Slovak for 'Strategy of survival in an exceptional situation. The impact of the Great War on the families in the area of Slovakia'), In Forum historiae, odborný internetový časopis pre históriu a príbuzné spoločenské vedy, 2009, Year 3, No. 1, pp. 1– 19. ISSN 1337-6861. http://www.forumhistoriae.sk.
- 2009 – Frauenbewegung in der Slowakei bis 1918: Bibliographie und Kommentar (Slovak for 'Women's movement in Slovakia until 1918: Bibliography and commentary'), In Wie Frauenbewegung geschrieben wird, Historiographie Dokumentation Stellungnahmen Bibliographien. - Wien, Erhard Locker GesmbH, 2009, pp. 329–349. ISBN 978-3-85409-521-7
- 2009 – Medzi vedou a politikou - večná dilema histórie? Úvod do diskusie (Slovak for 'Between the science and the politics - the eternal dilemma of History? An introduction into a discussion'), In Forum historiae - odborný internetový časopis pre históriu a príbuzné spoločenské vedy, 2009, Year 3, No. 1, pp. 1–2. ISSN 1337-6861.
- 2009 – Šľachta v stredoveku a ranom novoveku (Slovak for 'Nobility in the medieval and early modern periods'), In Historický časopis Historického ústavu SAV, 2009, Year 57, No. 3, pp. 615–617. ISSN 0018-2575
- 2009 – Špecifický ženský svet? (Slovak for 'A specific women's world?'), In Pamiatky a múzeá, Revue pre kultúrne dedičstvo, 2009, No. 1, p. 71. ISSN 1335-4353
- 2009 – Interdisciplinárna konferencia Špecifický ženský svet? Povolanie a profesia z pohľadu gender history (Slovak for 'Interdisciplinary conference 'A specific women's world?' Occupation and profession in view of gender history') In Historický časopis Historického ústavu SAV. Bratislava, Slovak Academic Press, 1952-, 2009, Year 57, No. 1, pp. 182–183. ISSN 0018-2575
- 2009 – Spoločnosť, kultúrny a spoločenský život (Slovak for 'Society, culture and social life (in Slovakia in the 20th century'), 1914–1918 JAKEŠOVÁ, Elena - DUDEKOVÁ, Gabriela - MANNOVÁ, Elena. In KOVÁČ, Dušan: Slovensko v 20. storočí. 2nd. Volume 'Prvá svetová vojna 1914-1918'. - Bratislava, Veda, Vydavateľstvo SAV, 2008, pp. 161–214. ISBN 978-80-224-1014-4
- 2011 – Na ceste k modernej žene: kapitoly z dejín rodových vzťahov na Slovensku (Slovak for 'On the way to the modern woman: Chapters from the gender history in Slovakia'), DUDEKOVÁ, Gabriela - BEŇOVÁ, Katarína - BRTÁŇOVÁ, Erika - FALISOVÁ, Anna - FRANCOVÁ, Zuzana - HOLEC, Roman - HOLLÝ, Karol - HUČKOVÁ, Dana - HUPKO, Daniel - JANURA, Tomáš - KAČÍREK, Ľuboš - KODAJOVÁ, Daniela - KUŠNIRÁKOVÁ, Ingrid - LENGOVÁ, Jana - LENGYELOVÁ, Tünde - MACHAJDÍK, Igor - MACHO, Peter - MANNOVÁ, Elena - MONGU, Blanka - ORIŠKOVÁ, Mária - PODRIMAVSKÝ, Milan - ŠEMŠEJ, Matej - ŠTIBRANÁ, Ingrid - TIŠLIAR, Pavol - VESELSKÁ, Natália - VODOCHODSKÝ, Ivan - VRZGULOVÁ, Monika - ZAVACKÁ, Katarína - ZAVACKÁ, Marína - ZUBERCOVÁ, Magdaléna M. 1. vyd. Bratislava : Veda, 2011. 773 s. Svet vedy, 18. Centrum excelentnosti výskumu kľúčových otázok moderných slovenských dejín (CEVKOMSD), VEGA č. 2/7181/27 Možnosti profesijnej a spoločenskej realizácie žien v moderných dejinách. ISBN 978-80-224-1189-9.
- 2012 – Medzi provinciou a metropolou: obraz Bratislavy v 19. a 20. storočí (Slovak for 'Between the periphery and metropole. Image of Bratislava in 19th and 20th century'), DUDEKOVÁ, Gabriela - GAUČÍK, Štefan - FALISOVÁ, Anna - KOVÁČ, Dušan - KURINCOVÁ, Elena. - KUŠNIRÁKOVÁ, Ingrid - LIPTÁK, Ľubomír - MANNOVÁ, Elena - MONGU, Blanka - MORAVČÍKOVÁ, Henrieta - TANZER, Jozef - ZAVACKÁ, Marína. Historický ústav SAV, Bratislava 2012. 264 s. Centrum excelentnosti SAV: Slovenské dejiny v dejinách Európy ( CE SDDE) a Vega 2/0085/10 Od provincie k metropole. Bratislava v 19. a 20. storočí - obraz mesta v sociálnom a politickom kontexte. ISBN 978-80-89396-21-4.
