= Mariya Sergeyenko =

Soviet scholar (1891–1987)

Mariya Yefimovna Sergeyenko (9 December 1891 – 28 October 1987) was a Soviet scholar of Roman history and philologist (Professor from 1948). Sergeyenko authored over 100 scholar works, many of which remain in manuscripts. She was awarded the Medal "For the Defence of Leningrad" and the medal "For Valorous Labour in the Great Patriotic War 1941–1945" for her service on the Eastern Front of World War II. Sergeyenko researched the Roman agriculture and the Roman daily life. She also translated Arrian's The Anabasis of Alexander and early Christian authors (Augustine of Hippo, Eusebius, Tertullian).

== Life ==
Sergeyenko was born in Chernigov Governorate. She graduated from the Chernigov women gymnasium. In 1910 she entered the history department of the Higher Women Courses. Sergeyenko participated in the seminars of Michael Rostovtzeff and Tadeusz Stefan Zieliński and considered herself their student. From fall 1915 she started to lecture Latin. In 1926 Sergeyenko submitted her first article, "The First Elegy of Tibullus".

In 1929, Sergeyenko moved from Saratov to St. Petersburg, where she worked in the city's library in 1931–34. From 1932 she also worked in the Institute of the History of Science and Technology at the Soviet Academy of Sciences. Sergeyenko studied the role of agricultural works of Varro, Cato the Elder and Columella in the development of ancient agronomy. In that area she wrote such works as "From the History of the Italian Gardening", "The Outline of the Development of the Roman Agronomy", "Varro and Columella as Stockbreeders", "The Precursors of Applied Botany in the Ancient World", "Corn Field Fertilization in Ancient Italy", "Two Types of Rural Farms in Italy in the 1st century AD". In 1935 Sergeyenko started to lecture Latin at the Historical and Philological Department of the St. Petersburg University. During World War II she refused to be evacuated with the university and continued her work in the besieged Leningrad.

From the 1960s, Sergeyenko researched the daily life of ancient Rome and its social and economic relations, having authored The Life in Ancient Rome (1964).
