= Mikhail Kublanov =

Soviet historian of religion (1914-1998)

Mikhail Moiseyevich Kublanov (Russian: Михаил Моисеевич Кубланов; 3 May 1914 – October 1998) was a Soviet scholar and historian of religion. Kublanov published about 100 scholarly works on the history of religion and archaeology. He was born in the city of Sebezh, then in the Russian Empire, he graduated from the history department of the Leningrad University. After the discovery of Dead Sea Scrolls Kublanov became one of the Soviet scholars who acknowledge the historicity of Jesus, unlike proponents of the Christ myth theory, like Sergey Kovalev. Kublanov also regarded the Testimonium Flavianum as authentic, writing that the passage, as attested to in Agapius' chronicle, "does not conflict with the political allegiance and religious affiliation of Josephus Flavius, so there is no evidence whatsoever to consider it false". In 1994 Kublanov emigrated to the United States and lived in Philadelphia. His works were also published in Hungary and Poland.

== Major publications ==
- "Finds in the Judean Desert" («Находки в Иудейской пустыне», 1960)
- "Jesus Christ – God, Man, Myth?" («Иисус Христос – Бог, человек, миф?», 1964)
- "The New Testament. Searches and Finds" («Новый Завет. Поиски и находки», 1968)
- "The Emergence of Christianity. Epoch. Ideas. Searches" («Возникновение христианства. Эпоха. Идеи. Искания», 1974)
