= Nikolai Mashkin =

Soviet historian of Ancient Rome (1900–1950)

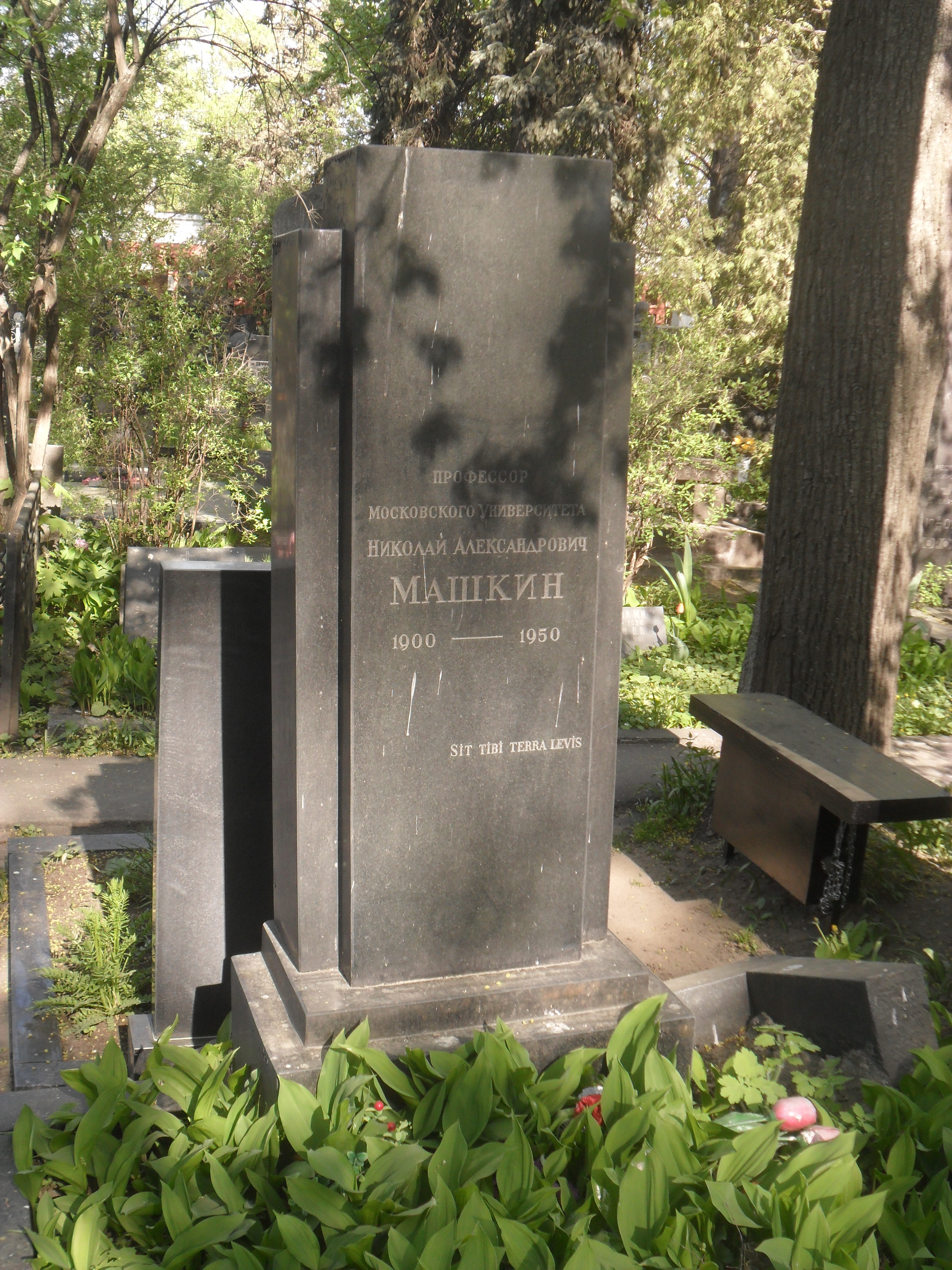
Mashkin's grave at the Novodevichy Cemetery, Moscow

Nikolai Alexandrovich Mashkin (Russian: Николай Александрович Машкин; 9 February 1900, Sokolki – 15 September 1950, Moscow) was a Soviet scholar of Ancient Rome (Doctor of Historical Sciences and Professor from 1942). Mashkin authored The History of Ancient Rome (1947–56), which was translated into several languages, and The Principate of Augustus. Its Origin and Social Essence (1949, translated into German, Italian, Hungarian and Romanian languages). In 1950 Mashkin received the Stalin Prize.

Mashkin was born in the village of Sokolki, present Bugulminsky District in Russia. Having finished a school in Bugulma, he studied at the Faculty of History and Philosophy of the Samara State University (1921/22) and at the Faculty of Social Sciences of the Moscow University. In 1938 Mashkin received his doctorate. Mashkin extensively studied the history of Roman provinces, particularly Africa. He also authored several works on circumcellions.

He published in Journal of Ancient History.
