= Annie =

Annie may refer to:

== People and fictional characters ==
- Annie (given name), a given name and a list of people and fictional characters with the name
- Annie (Malayalam actress) (born 1975), Indian actress who works in Malayalam-language films
- Annie (Telugu actress) (born 2001), Indian actress who works in Telugu-language films
- Annie (singer) (born 1977), Norwegian singer
- Annie Moon (born 2002), South Korean singer and rapper also known mononymously as Annie

== Theatre and film ==
- Annie (musical), a 1977 musical
  - Annie (original Broadway cast recording), a 1977 album
  - Annie (1982 film)
    - Annie (1982 film soundtrack)
    - Annie: A Royal Adventure!, a 1995 telefilm sequel
  - Annie (1999 film)
    - Annie (1999 film soundtrack)
  - Annie (2014 film)
    - Annie (2014 film soundtrack)
- Annie (1976 film), a British-Italian film
- Annie (1976 film), a lingy film

== Music ==
- Annie (Anne Murray album) (1972)
- "Annie" (song), a 1999 song by Our Lady Peace
- "Annie", a song by SafetySuit
- "Annie", a song by Pete Townshend from Rough Mix
- "Annie", a 1972 song by Sutherland Brothers
- "Annie", a 1995 song by Elastica from the album Elastica
- "Annie", a 2007 song by James Blunt from the album All the Lost Souls

== Other uses ==
- Cyclone Annie (disambiguation)
- Annie (locomotive)
- Annie (sloop), a ship built in 1880
- Accelerator Neutrino Neutron Interaction Experiment (ANNIE)
- Annie Award, an award for animation
- Annie 30, an American sailboat design

== See also ==
- Anni (disambiguation)
- Annie Creek (disambiguation)
- Annie's (disambiguation)
- Annie's Mailbox, an advice column written by Ann Landers' former editors from 2002 to 2016
- M65 atomic cannon, nicknamed "Atomic Annie", an American towed artillery piece
- Ann (disambiguation)
- Anne (disambiguation)
- Rescue Annie or Resusci Anne, a doll used to teach CPR/EAR
