= William M. Fowler =

Historian

William Morgan Fowler Jr.
- Born: July 25, 1944 (age 82); Tarpon Springs, Florida, U.S.
- Occupation: Historian
- Children: 2

Academic background
- Education: Northeastern University; University of Notre Dame

Academic work
- Discipline: History
- Sub-discipline: American and maritime History
- Institutions: Northeastern University; Massachusetts Historical Society; Frank C. Munson Institute of American Maritime History

William Morgan Fowler Jr. (born July 25, 1944) is a professor of history at Northeastern University and an author. He served as Director of the Massachusetts Historical Society from 1998 through 2005.

== Early life and education ==
Born in Tarpon Springs, Florida, the son of William Fowler, a U.S. Postal Service employee, and his wife Eleanor, he grew up in Wakefield, Massachusetts, and attended Wakefield High School and Northeastern University, Boston, graduating magna cum laude in 1966. He went on to the University of Notre Dame, where he earned his M.A. in 1969 and his PhD in 1971. He served in the U.S. Army Reserve from 1970 to 1984, reaching the grade of Captain. In August 1968, he married Marilyn Louise Noble, an elementary school teacher, and together they had two children.

== Academic career ==
Fowler was appointed an assistant professor in 1971 at Northeastern University, promoted to associate professor in 1977, and full professor in 1980. In addition, he served as acting dean of the college of arts and sciences in 1977, vice provost, 1989–1991, and department chair in 1993–1997, before leaving to become the director of the Massachusetts Historical Society. He returned to Northeastern on January 1, 2006, after eight years at the society. When he announced that he would leave the president of the society, Amalie M. Kass, honored him for the positive changes that he accomplished during his tenure. Kass stated, "Bill Fowler brought our Society into a leadership role in the cultural and intellectual life of Boston, the state, and even the nation […] Dr. Fowler has kept this mission at the forefront of his work and we intend to go forward in that spirit."

Fowler also teaches at the Frank C. Munson Institute of American Maritime History at Mystic Seaport Museum and has lectured at the Smithsonian Institution, the United States Naval War College, St. John's Preparatory School, and the Sea Education Association. He is a trustee of the Ralph Waldo Emerson Association, The Paul Revere Memorial Association, and the Old North Church Foundation. He is also a member of the Massachusetts State Archives Advisory Commission and an honorary member of the Boston Marine Society, and the Society of the Cincinnati as well as a consulting editor to The New England Quarterly.

== Honors and awards ==
- Samuel Eliot Morison Distinguished Service Award, USS Constitution Museum, 1985.
- Northeastern University Outstanding Alumnus Award, 1994.
- Honorary degree L.H.D., Northeastern University, 2000.
- Bay State Historical League Ayer Award

== Published works ==
- William Ellery: A Rhode Island Politico and Lord of Admiralty (1973)
- Rebels Under Sail: The American Navy during the Revolution (1976)
- The American Revolution: Changing Perspectives, edited by Wallace Coyle and William M. Fowler Jr. (1979)
- The Baron of Beacon Hill: A Biography of John Hancock (1980)
- Jack Tars and Commodores: The American Navy, 1783–1815 (1984)
- Under Two Flags: The Navy in the Civil War (1990)
- Silas Talbot Captain of the Old Ironsides (1995)
- Samuel Adams: Radical Puritan (1997)
- America and The Sea: A Maritime History by Benjamin W. Labaree, William M. Fowler Jr., John B. Hattendorf, Edward W. Sloan, Jeffrey J. Safford, and Andrew German, (1998)
- Empires at War: The French and Indian War and the Struggle for North America, 1754–1763 (2005)
- America and The Sea: Treasures from the collection of Mystic Seaport (co-author) (2005)
- An American Crisis: George Washington and the Dangerous Two Years After Yorktown, 1781–1783 (2011)
- Steam Titans: Cunard, Collins, and the Epic Battle for Commerce on the North Atlantic (2017)
