= Annie 30 =

American recreational sailboat

Development
- Designer: Chuck Paine
- Location: United States
- Year: 1980
- No. built: 16
- Builder: Morris Yachts
- Name: Annie 30

Boat
- Displacement: 11,027 lb (5,002 kg)
- Draft: 4.50 ft (1.37 m)

Hull
- Type: Monohull
- Construction: Fiberglass
- LOA: 30.00 ft (9.14 m)
- LWL: 24.50 ft (7.47 m)
- Beam: 9.50 ft (2.90 m)
- Engine: Westerbeke diesel engine

Hull appendages
- Keel: long keel
- Rudders: transom-mounted, keel-mounted rudder

Rig
- Rig type: Bermuda rig
- I foretriangle height: 39.00 ft (11.89 m)
- J foretriangle base: 12.67 ft (3.86 m)
- P mainsail luff: 33.75 ft (10.29 m)
- E mainsail foot: 12.50 ft (3.81 m)

Sails
- Sailplan: Masthead sloop
- Mainsail area: 210.94 sq ft (19.597 m^{2})
- Jib/genoa area: 247.07 sq ft (22.954 m^{2})
- Total sail area: 458.00 sq ft (42.550 m^{2})

The Annie 30, often just called Annie, is an American sailboat that was designed by Chuck Paine as an offshore cruiser and first built in 1980.

The Annie design was later developed into the Annie 2 by Paine and offered as plans for custom building or amateur construction.

== Production ==
The design was built by Morris Yachts in Bass Harbor, Maine, United States. The company built 16 examples of the design, starting in 1980, but it is now out of production.

== Design ==
The Annie is a recreational keelboat, built predominantly of fiberglass, with wood trim. It has a masthead sloop rig, a spooned raked stem, a sloped transom, a transom-hung and keel-mounted rudder controlled by a tiller and a fixed long keel, with the forefoot cutaway. It displaces 11,027 lb (5,002 kg).

The boat has a draft of 4.50 ft (1.37 m) with the standard keel fitted.

The boat is fitted with a Westerbeke two-cylinder diesel engine for docking and maneuvering. The fuel tank holds 18 U.S. gallons (68 L; 15 imp gal) and the fresh water tank has a capacity of 37 U.S. gallons (140 L; 31 imp gal).

The cabin has two design interior versions, both using teak trim. One has a forward head, just aft of the "V"-berth, while the other has an aft head, in place of the chart table and a dresser in the forward cabin. The forward cabin has a privacy curtain. The galley is located aft, on the starboard side, just ahead of the companionway stairs and has an optional two-burner stove. A shower is also optional and uses freshwater engine cooling to heat the water. Ventilation is via nine opening ports.

The genoa has tracks and the mainsheet traveler is mounted aft of the cockpit.

== Operational history ==
In a review Richard Sherwood described the design, "Annie is a heavy-displacement boat, but she has a very tall rig and much greater sail area in the jib than older boats. In addition, freeboard is low, the bow is sharp, and the keel is quite narrow. The forefoot is cut away. With the long keel and the heavy displacement, Annie should track well. The tall rig will assist in light air."

== See also ==
- List of sailing boat types
- Annie (sloop) - a historic boat with the same name

Similar sailboats

- Alberg 30
- Alberg Odyssey 30
- Aloha 30
- Bahama 30
- Bristol 29.9
- C&C 30
- C&C 30 Redwing
- Catalina 30
- Catalina 309
- CS 30
- Grampian 30
- Hunter 30
- Hunter 30T
- Hunter 30-2
- Hunter 306
- Kirby 30
- Leigh 30
- Mirage 30
- Mirage 30 SX
- Nonsuch 30
- O'Day 30
- Pearson 303
- S2 9.2
- Seafarer 30
- Southern Cross 28
- Tanzer 31
