= William A. Baker =

American naval architect and maritime historian

- Born: William Avery Baker; October 21, 1911; New Britain, Connecticut, U.S.
- Died: September 9, 1981 (aged 69); Cambridge, Massachusetts, U.S.
- Education: Massachusetts Institute of Technology (SB, 1934)
- Known for: Mayflower II, Maryland Dove, Reconstructions of colonial vessels
- Title: Curator, Francis Russell Hart Nautical Museum
- Spouse: Ruth Stuart (m. 1936)
- Awards: Honorary Member, Society of Naval Architects and Marine Engineers (1980)
- Scientific career
- Fields: Naval architecture, Maritime history
- Workplaces: Bethlehem Steel Corporation (Shipbuilding Division); Massachusetts Institute of Technology

William Avery Baker (born in New Britain, Connecticut on 21 October 1911 – died 9 September 1981) was a distinguished naval architect of replica historic ships and a maritime historian, who was curator of the Francis Russell Hart Nautical Museum at Massachusetts Institute of Technology 1963–1981.

== Early life and education ==
The son of William Elisha Baker and his wife Margaret MacDonald Sanderson, William A. Baker was educated at the Massachusetts Institute of Technology, where he earned an S.B. degree in 1934 in the Department of Naval Architecture and Marine Engineering with a thesis on "Development of Catamaran Hulls" supervised by George Davis. On 2 May 1936, he married Ruth Stuart.

== Professional career ==
In 1934, Baker joined the shipbuilding division of the Bethlehem Steel Corporation and became a registered professional engineer in the states of California and Massachusetts. Baker served with them until 1963, when he became curator of the Francis Russell Hart Nautical Museum and part time lecturer in the MIT Department of Ocean Engineering. He was the compiler of plans and specifications for a number of historic Ship replicas, including Gjoa in 1948, Mayflower II in 1957, Adventure in 1970, and Maryland Dove in 1978.

He served as a member of the editorial advisory board of the American Neptune, 1952–1981; Mystic Seaport, 1973–1981. He was a Fellow and trustee of the Pilgrim Society, Plimoth Plantation, and a member of the Society of Naval Architects and Marine Engineers, of which he was co-founder of the New England section in 1943 and served as secretary-treasurer, 1943–44, and chairman in 1957–58. He also served as secretary-treasurer of the Northern California section in 1949, and became an honorary member of the society in 1980. Among other organizations, he was a long-time member of the Hakluyt Society, the Society for Nautical Research and the Boston Marine Society. He was a founder and the first president of the North American Society for Oceanic History.

== Published works ==
- The new Mayflower, her design and construction, by her designer. Illustrations by R.S. & W.A. Baker. Barre, Mass., Barre Gazette, 1958.
- Colonial vessels; some seventeenth-century sailing craft. Illustrated by the author. Barre, Mass., Barre Pub. Co., 1962.
- The engine powered vessel: from paddle-wheeler to nuclear ship. New York, N.Y.: Grosset & Dunlap, 1965.
- Sloops & shallops Barre, Mass., Barre Pub. Co. 1966; Columbia: University of South Carolina Press, 1988.
- The clipper ship. [Exhibition] Hayden Gallery, Massachusetts Institute of Technology, November 14 through December 2, 1966. [Cambridge, Mass.]: The Hayden Gallery, 1966.
- A history of the Boston Marine Society, 1742-1967. Boston: Boston Marine Society, 1968.
- A history of the first 75 years. Cambridge, M.I.T. Dept. of Naval Architecture and Marine Engineering, 1969.
- C. J. A. Wilson’s Ships. With notes and comments by William A. Baker. Introd. by Richard B. Holman. Barre, Mass., Barre Publishers, 1971.
- New England and the sea, by Robert G. Albion, William A. Baker, and Benjamin W. Labaree. Marion V. Brewington, picture editor. Middletown, Conn., Published for the Marine Historical Association, Mystic Seaport, by Wesleyan University Press [1972].
- "Maritime History of Bath Maine and the Kennebec River Region, Vol. I and Vol . II" Marine Research Society of Bath, 1973
- Maine shipbuilding: A bibliographical guide. Portland: Maine Historical Society, 1974.
- The Mayflower and other colonial vessels. Annapolis, Md.: Naval Institute Press, A 1983.
