= Jane M. Rausch =

American historian and professor

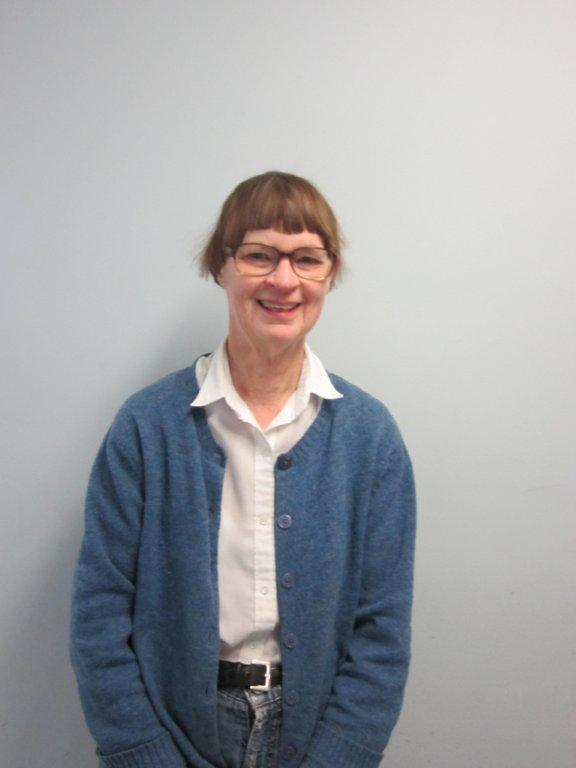
- Occupations: Historian and Professor

Academic background
- Education: DePauw University; University of Wisconsin–Madison
- Thesis: Educational Reform in Colombia, 1863–1886

Academic work
- Discipline: Colombian history and Latin American frontier studies
- Institutions: University of Massachusetts Amherst

Jane Meyer Rausch is an American historian and professor emerita of history at the University of Massachusetts Amherst. She is known for her research on the Llanos Orientales region and for her studies of Colombia during the nineteenth and twentieth centuries.

== Early life and education ==
Rausch earned her B.A. in Spanish and history from DePauw University in 1962. She completed an M.A. in Ibero-American Studies at the University of Wisconsin–Madison in 1964 and received her Ph.D. in comparative tropical history from the same institution in 1969. Her dissertation, Modernization and Educational Reform in Colombia, 1863–1886, examined nineteenth-century Colombian education in the era of federalism.

== Academic career ==
Rausch joined the faculty of the University of Massachusetts Amherst in 1969, initially as an instructor in history. She became assistant professor in 1971, associate professor in 1976, and full professor in 1984. She retired in 2010 and was named professor emerita.

In 1981 she was awarded the Conference on Latin American History’s Robertson Prize, and during the 1980s she was elected corresponding member of the Academia de Historia del Meta and honorary member of the Centro de Historia de Casanare. She was also nominated for the University of Massachusetts Distinguished Teaching Award in 1986.

In 2012 she was invited as a distinguished lecturer at the XVI Congreso Colombiano de Historia, and the following year she was a participant in the Coloquio Frontera y Territorio en las Ciencias Sociales y las Humanidades at the Universidad Autónoma de San Luis Potosí in Mexico. In 2014 Fulbright Colombia presented her with a special award recognizing fifty years of dedication to Colombian history, coinciding with a public ceremony in Bogotá. In June 2021, she was honored at the III Congreso Internacional hosted by the Universidad Pedagógica y Tecnológica.

== Research and scholarship ==
Rausch’s research has focused on Colombian history, especially the Llanos Orientales, as well as comparative frontier regions in Latin America. Her early work, A Tropical Plains Frontier: The Llanos of Colombia, 1531–1831 (1984), established her reputation as a leading historian of the Colombian frontier. She followed this with The Llanos Frontier in Colombian History, 1830–1930 (1993), Colombia: Territorial Rule and the Llanos Frontier (1999), and From Frontier Town to Metropolis: A History of Villavicencio, Colombia since 1842 (2007), which traced the evolution of Villavicencio from a remote settlement to a modern city.

Her later research broadened to Colombian and South American participation in global conflicts. In Colombia and World War I: The Experience of a Neutral Latin American Nation during the Great War and its Aftermath, 1914–1921 (2014), she examined the nation’s neutrality and international relations during and after the war. She also published Santiago Pérez Triana: Colombian Man of Letters and Crusader for Hemispheric Unity (2017).

In addition to her monographs, Rausch has written extensively on Colombian sport, culture, and society, including studies of cycling, baseball, and changing perceptions of animals in Bogotá. Her articles have appeared in journals such as The Latin Americanist, Journal of Caribbean History, Revista Iberoamericana, and Revista de Estudios Colombianos.

Rausch co-edited several volumes that have become staples in Latin American history courses. With Lewis Hanke she edited People and Issues in Latin American History, volumes on both the colonial and national periods, published in multiple updated editions. With David Weber she co-edited Where Cultures Meet: Frontiers in Latin American History (1994), which helped define the field of comparative frontier studies. She also translated and edited works on European music and cultural history.

== Selected publications ==
=== Monographs ===
- "The sound choice : the Holyoke Civic Symphony: Holyoke, Massachusetts: a history, 1967-2017 | WorldCat.org". search.worldcat.org.
- Rausch, Jane M. (2017). Santiago Perez Triana (1858-1916): Colombian man of letters and crusader for hemispheric unity. Princeton, New Jersey: Markus Wiener Publishers. ISBN 978-1-55876-625-9.
- Rausch, Jane M. (2014). Colombia and World War I: the experience of a neutral Latin American nation during the Great War and its aftermath, 1914-1921. Lanham: Lexington Books. ISBN 978-0-7391-8773-9.
- Rausch, Jane M. (2014). Colombia and World War I: The Experience of a Neutral Latin American Nation during the Great War and Its Aftermath, 1914-1921. Lanham, MD: Lexington Books. ISBN 978-0-7391-8773-9.
- Rausch, Jane M. (2007). From frontier town to metropolis: a history of Villavicencio, Colombia, since 1842. Lanham: Rowman & Littlefield. ISBN 978-0-7425-5473-3.
- Rausch, Jane M.; Rausch, Jane M. (1993). The Llanos frontier in Colombian history, 1830-1930 (1st ed.). Albuquerque: University of New Mexico Press. ISBN 978-0-8263-1396-6.
- Rausch, Jane M., ed. (1999). Colombia: territorial rule and the Llanos frontier. Gainesville: University Press of Florida. ISBN 978-0-8130-1718-1.
- Rausch, Jane M. (1984). A tropical plains frontier: the Llanos of Colombia, 1531 - 1831 (1st ed.). Albuquerque: Univ. of New Mexico Pr. ISBN 978-0-8263-0761-3.

=== Edited Books ===
- Mehring, Arndt; Rausch, Jane M. (2000). Friedrich Kuhlau in the mirror of his flute works. Detroit monographs in musicology/Studies in music. Warren, MI: Harmonie Park Press. ISBN 978-0-89990-091-9.
- Weber, David J.; Rausch, Jane M., eds. (1994). Where cultures meet: frontiers in Latin American history. Jaguar books on Latin America. Wilmington, Del: SR Books. ISBN 978-1-4616-4700-3.
- People and issues in Latin American history. 1: The colonial experience, New York, NY: Wiener, 1993, ISBN 978-1-55876-061-5

=== Articles ===
- Rausch, Jane M. (2023-06-30). "Colombia's Cut Flower Industry: Unprecedented Growth and Controversy, 1960-2022 | Middle Atlantic Review of Latin American Studies". Middle Atlantic Review of Latin American Studies Journal. doi:10.23870/marlas.
- Rausch, Jane (2023-08-01). "Latin American Participation in the Olympics". Journal of Emerging Sport Studies. 9. doi:10.26522/jess.v9i.4401. ISSN 2562-3184.
- Rausch, Jane M. (2023-04-26). "The Development of Baseball in Colombia —A Caribbean Anomaly?". Memorias. 48: 129–149. doi:10.14482/memor.48.505.892. ISSN 1794-8886.
- Rausch, Jane M. (2022). "Opening the Gateway to South America at mid-20th Century: The Remarkable Lie and Work of Kathleen Romoli (1897-1979)". Hispanic Journal. 43 (1): 117–131. ISSN 0271-0986.
- Rausch, Jane M. (2021). "Play Ball! The Gómez Dictatorship and the Development of Baseball in Venezuela, 1909–1935". Journal of Caribbean History. 55 (2): 176–194. doi:10.1353/jch.2021.0002. ISSN 0799-5946.
- Rausch, Jane M.; Izard, Miguel (1988). "Tierra firme: Historia de Venezuela y Colombia". The Hispanic American Historical Review. 68 (3): 578. doi:10.2307/2516521. ISSN 0018-2168. JSTOR 2516521.
- Raush, Jane (2022-02-11). "Dictatorship and Sports in Colombia". Journal of Emerging Sport Studies. doi:10.26522/jess.v4i.3715. ISSN 2562-3184.
