= John H. Kemble =

American historian (1912–1990)

- Born: June 17, 1912; Marshalltown, Iowa, U.S.
- Died: February 19, 1990 (aged 77)

Academic background
- Education: Stanford University; University of California, Berkeley

Academic work
- Discipline: history
- Sub-discipline: maritime history

John Haskell Kemble (June 17, 1912 – February 19, 1990) was a professor of history at Pomona College and an influential American maritime historian.

== Early life and education ==
The son of Ira Oscar Kemball and his wife, Caroline Haskell, John Haskell Kemble was born on June 17, 1912, in Marshalltown, Iowa. He received his Bachelor of Arts degree at Stanford University in 1933, his master's degree and Ph.D. from the University of California, Berkeley in 1934 and 1937.

== Academic career ==
In 1936, he joined the faculty at Pomona College, where he remained for his entire career. He was promoted to full professor in 1951 and appointed professor emeritus in 1977.

During World War II, he served in the United States Navy from 1941 to 1946, rising to the rank of lieutenant commander in the Naval Reserve.

Kemble was a Rockefeller Fellow, 1947–48; Visiting lecturer in history at the University of California, Los Angeles, 1948–49. In 1952–53, he held the academic post at the Naval War College, which the following year was named the Ernest J. King Professor of Maritime History. He was a Guggenheim Fellow in 1956–57. In 1967, he was visiting professor of history at the University of Texas.

Kemble served as secretary-treasurer of the Pacific Coast branch of the American Historical Association in 1941–42 and 1945–49. In addition, he was a member of the California Historical Resources Commission in 1976–79. He served as president of the Historical Society of Southern California in 1967–70. A founding member of the North American Society for Oceanic History, he served as a vice president from 1975 to 1990. He served as a member of the Secretary of the Navy's Advisory Committee on Naval History, from 1961.

A close associate of Professor Robert G. Albion, Kemble was one of the original faculty members of the Frank C. Munson Institute of American Maritime History at Mystic Seaport, where Kemble House is named for him.

He died on February 19, 1990, and his papers were deposited at the Huntington Library.

== Published works ==
- Side-Wheelers Across the Pacific (1942)
- The Panama Route, 1848–1869 (1943)
- San Francisco Bay: A Pictorial Maritime History (1957)
- Journal of a Cruise to California and the Sandwich Islands, 1841–1844 by William D. Myers, edited by J. H. Kemble (1955)
- Two Years Before the Mast by Richard Henry Dana Junior, edited by J. H. Kemble (1964)
- To California and the South Seas: The Diary of Albert G. Osbun, 1849–1851 edited by J. H. Kemble (1966)
- Sketches of California and Hawaii, 1842–1843 by William H. Meyers, edited by J. H. Kemble (1970)
- A Naval Campaign in the Californias, 1846–1849 edited by J. H. Kemble
