= Benjamin Woods Labaree =

American historian (1927–2021)

Benjamin Woods Labaree (July 21, 1927 – August 30, 2021) was a leading historian of American colonial history and American maritime history. He was born in New Haven, Connecticut.

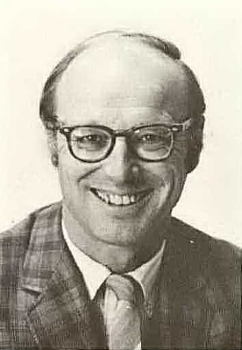
Benjamin W. Labaree, 1977

== Early life and education ==
Son of the Yale University professor of history Leonard Woods Labaree and Elizabeth Mary Calkins, Benjamin Woods Labaree was raised in New Haven, Connecticut, and attended The Hotchkiss School. He earned his bachelor's degree at Yale University in 1950, after having served in the U.S. Naval Reserve in 1945-46. After graduation from Yale, he went on to Harvard University, where he earned his master's degree in history in 1953 and his Ph.D. in history in 1957.

== Professional career ==
Labaree began his teaching career as an instructor in history at Phillips Exeter Academy in New Hampshire from 1950 until 1952 and then at Connecticut College in New London, Connecticut, in 1957-58. In 1958, he received an appointment at Harvard University, rising from instructor to assistant professor of history and Allston Burr Senior Tutor. While serving in these appointments, he was also managing editor of the Essex Institute Historical Collections at the Essex Institute, Salem, Massachusetts, in 1956-60. In 1963, he was appointed dean of Williams College, in Williamstown, Massachusetts, serving in that role until 1967. Concurrently, he served as an associate professor, then professor of history, 1963–77 and later Ephraim Williams Professor of American History, 1972-77. Between 1977-1989, he was director of the Williams College-Mystic Seaport Program (commonly called Williams-Mystic) at Mystic Seaport Museum, Mystic, Connecticut, 1977–89; director, Center for Environmental Studies at Williams College, 1989–92; and professor of history and environmental studies, 1989–92. He retired from Williams College in 1992 as professor emeritus.

Closely associated with Professor Robert G. Albion of Harvard University, Labaree succeeded him as Director of the Frank C. Munson Institute of American Maritime History in 1974. His directorship of the Munson Institute culminated with being co-director of the National Endowment of the Humanities Summer Institute for college and university teachers on America and the Sea in 1996.

After retirement from Williams, he was visiting professor at Trinity College (Connecticut) in 1993, Williams College in 1994, Clark University in 1997, and the Fletcher School of Law and Diplomacy at Tufts University in 1998.

== Awards ==
Labaree was honored with the Citation of Honor by the Society of Colonial Wars in 1978, The Wilbur Cross Award by the Connecticut Humanities Council in 1990, the Samuel Eliot Morison Award of the USS Constitution Museum in 1993, and a co-recipient of the John Lyman Book Award by the North American Society for Oceanic History in 1999. Labaree House at Mystic Seaport Museum was named in his honor.

== Published works ==
- Patriots and Partisans, 1962
- The Boston Tea Party, 1964, 1968
- New England and the Sea, by Robert G. Albion, William A. Baker and Benjamin W. Labaree. Marion V. Brewington, picture editor, 1972
- American Nation-Time: 1607-1789 1972, 1976
- The Atlantic world of Robert G. Albion, edited by Benjamin W. Labaree; with chapters by William A. Baker ... [et al.] and a bibliography of the works of Robert G. Albion by Joan Bentick-Smith; drawings by William A. Baker, 1975.
- Patriots and partisans: the merchants of Newburyport, 1764-1815. 1975
- Empire or independence, 1760-1776: a British-American dialogue on the coming of the American Revolution, edited by Ian R. Christie and Benjamin W. Labaree, 1976
- Colonial Massachusetts: A History, 1979
- A supplement (1971–1986) to Robert G. Albion's Naval & Maritime history, an annotated bibliography, fourth edition, 1988
- America and the sea: a maritime history, by Benjamin W. Labaree, William M. Fowler, Jr., John B. Hattendorf, Edward W. Sloan, Jeffrey J. Safford, and Andrew German, 1998
