= John Kemble =

John Kemble may refer to:

- John Kemble (martyr) (1599–1679), English Roman Catholic martyr
- John C. Kemble (1800–1843), New York politician
- John H. Kemble (1912–1990), American professor of history and maritime historian
- John Philip Kemble (1757–1823), English actor and manager
- John Mitchell Kemble (1807–1857), English historian
