= Ernest J. King Professor of Maritime History =

Civilian professorship at the Naval War College

In May 1948, the President of the Naval War College Admiral Raymond Spruance recommended a plan to establish a civilian professorship of maritime history at the Naval War College. Approved by Secretary of the Navy John L. Sullivan on 29 December 1948, the post was not filled “for lack of funds” until 1951, when Thomas C. Mendenhall of Yale University was appointed to the position. In 1953, Secretary of the Navy Robert Bernard Anderson named the chair in honor of Fleet Admiral Ernest J. King, recognizing King's great personal interest in maritime history. The Ernest J. King chair was named and first filled during the tenure of Professor Clarence H. Haring. At that point, there was only one other named academic chair in the United States for the field of maritime history, that held by the Gardiner Professor of Oceanic History and Affairs established at Harvard University in 1948. The Naval War College's first permanent long-term civilian faculty member came in 1966 and its larger civilian faculty began in 1972. Between 1951 and 1973, the King Chair was regularly held as a one-year visiting appointment. It became a permanent faculty appointment in 1974. The position reverted to a visiting professorship in October 2016.

== List of Professors ==
- 1951-1952 Thomas C. Mendenhall, Yale University
- 1952-1953 John H. Kemble, Pomona College
- 1953-1954 Clarence H. Haring, Harvard University
- 1954-1955 James A. Field Jr., Swarthmore College
- 1955-1956 Hiram M. Stout, CIA
- 1956-1957 Ollinger Crenshaw, W & L University
- 1957-1958 Gordon B. Turner, Princeton University
- 1958-1959 Lawrence O. Ealy, Temple University
- 1959-1960 James A. Huston, Purdue University
- 1960-1961 Edward A. Younger, University of Virginia
- 1961-1962 Charles A. Jellison, University of New Hampshire
- 1962-1963 Theodore Ropp, Duke University
- 1963-1964 William Richard Emerson, Yale University
- 1964-1965 Boleslaw B. Szczesniak, University of Notre Dame
- 1965-1966 C. J. Smith, University of Georgia
- 1966-1967 H.L. Coles, Ohio State University
- 1976-1968 Raymond G. O'Connor, Temple University
- 1968-1969 Gerald E. Wheeler, San Jose State College
- 1969-1970 Stephen E. Ambrose, Johns Hopkins University
- 1970-1971 Thaddeus V. Tuleja, St Peter's College
- 1971-1973 Martin Blumenson, Acadia University
- 1973-1974 J. Kenneth McDonald, George Washington University
- 1974-1980 Philip A. Crowl
- 1980-1984 Vacant
- 1984–2016 John Hattendorf
- 2016–Present John Hattendorf in emeritus status
- 2017- 2020 Craig Symonds
- 2020 - 2021 John T. Kuehn

== Sources ==
- John B. Hattendorf, B. Mitchell Simpson III, and John R. Wadleigh, Sailors and Scholars: The Centennial History of the U.S. Naval War College. (Newport; Naval War College Press, 1984), p. 205.
- Newport, Rhode Island, Naval War College, Archives, Record Group 3, Box 141, Folder 2, "FADM Ernest J. King Professor."
