= Nellie (sloop) =

Historic oyster boat in Connecticut, United States

Coordinates: 41°21′45″N 71°57′55″W

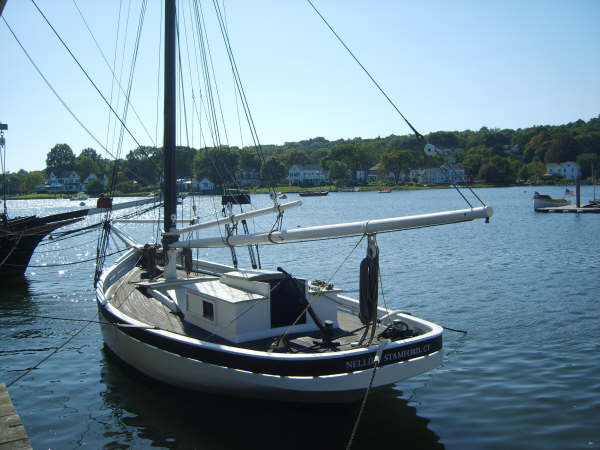

History

United States
- Owner: Mystic Seaport
- Completed: 1891
- Acquired: 1964
- Status: Museum ship

General characteristics
- Length: 32 ft (9.8 m) LOD 32 ft 7 in (9.93 m) (LOA)
- Beam: 12 ft 5 in (3.78 m)
- Propulsion: Sail
- Sail plan: Sloop

Nellie is an oyster sloop located at Mystic Seaport in Mystic, Connecticut, United States. Nellie was built in 1891 in Smithtown, New York and was used for oyster dredging in Long Island Sound. Mystic Seaport acquired her in 1964 to add to their collection of watercraft.

== Images ==
- Nellie, a Long Island Oyster Sloop, The Book of Wooden Boats, Vol. 1
