= Roann (dragger) =

Coordinates: 41°21′45″N 71°57′55″W

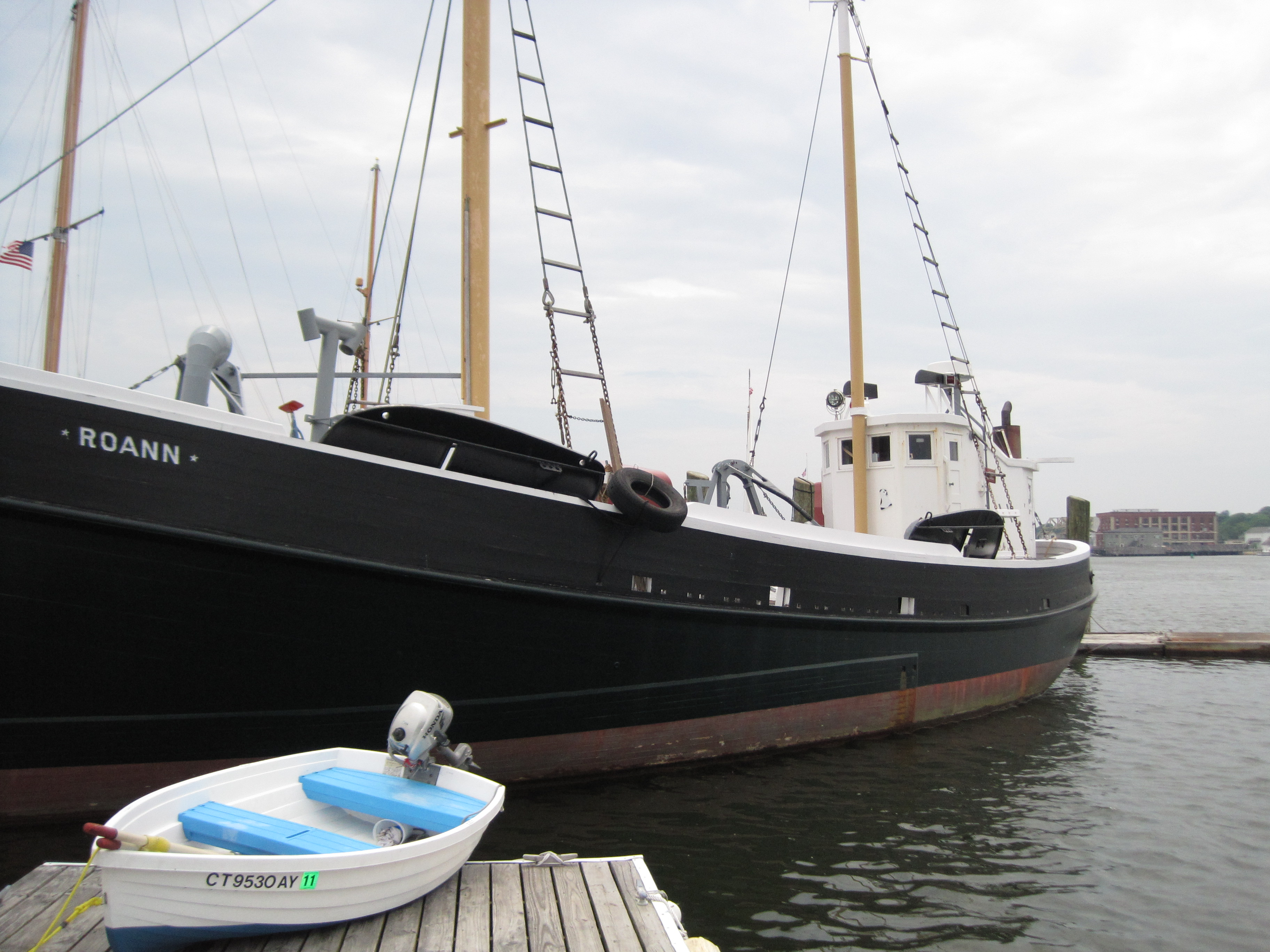

History

United States
- Owner: Mystic Seaport
- Builder: Newbert & Wallace
- Completed: 1947
- Acquired: c.1970
- Identification: MMSI number: 367619940; Callsign: WDH4655
- Status: Museum ship

General characteristics
- Class & type: Eastern rig dragger
- Length: 60 ft (18 m)
- Propulsion: Diesel engine
- Crew: 3

Roann is an Eastern rig dragger located at Mystic Seaport in Mystic, Connecticut, United States. Roann was built in 1947 in Thomaston, Maine by Newbert & Wallace and was used to fish for flounder, cod, and haddock. Mystic Seaport acquired the vessel to add to their collection of watercraft after she became obsolete in the 1970s. In 2009, Roann underwent a complete restoration.
