= Robert G. Albion =

American maritime historian (1896–1983)

Robert Greenhalgh Albion
- Mystic Seaport photo, by Mary Anne Stets
- Born: August 15, 1896; Malden, Massachusetts, U.S.
- Died: August 9, 1983 (aged 86); Groton, Connecticut, U.S.
- Education: Bowdoin College (AB); Harvard University (MA, PhD)
- Spouse: Jennie Barnes Pope (deceased in 1975)
- Awards: Presidential Medal for Merit; Honorary degree of Doctor of Letters by Bowdoin College
- Scientific career
- Fields: Oceanic History
- Workplaces: Princeton University, Department of the Navy, Harvard University, University of Maine
- Thesis: Forests and Sea Power: The Timber Problem of the Royal Navy (1926)
- Doctoral advisor: Wilbur Cortez Abbott
- Doctoral students: John Curtis Perry

Robert Greenhalgh Albion (August 15, 1896, in Malden, Massachusetts – August 9, 1983, in Groton, Connecticut) was Harvard's first professor of Oceanic History and inspired two generations of maritime historians in the United States.

== Early life and education ==
Albion was born in 1896 in Malden, Massachusetts, to James Francis Albion, a Universalist minister, and Alice Marion Lamb. In 1904, the family moved to South Portland, Maine. Albion maintained a home there until his wife died in 1975.

Albion became interested in journalism and shipping while studying economics at Bowdoin College, where he graduated with a bachelor's degree in 1918. He was a member of Phi Beta Kappa society. After serving as a second lieutenant in the Army Infantry at the end of World War One, he became a graduate at Harvard University. He received his master's degree in 1920 and completed his doctorate in British history in 1924 with a dissertation on Forests and Sea Power: The Timber Problem of the Royal Navy. Published in 1926, this work was a highly influential study that combined his interests in ships, British history, and economics.

== Professional career ==
He began his teaching career at Princeton University as an instructor of British history in 1922 and he taught a popular course in maritime history, rising to be professor of history and assistant dean of the faculty. In 1923, he married Jennie Barnes Pope, who collaborated with him on several works. After writing several works on military history, he returned to maritime history with The Rise of New York Port, 1815-1860 and Square Riggers on Schedule.

From 1943 to 1950, he was assistant director of Naval History and Historian of Naval Administration for the Department of the Navy. In this position, he oversaw the work of some 150 naval officers, who wrote about 200 studies on the navy's wartime administration. In 1948, President Harry S. Truman awarded him the Presidential Medal for Merit for his work in naval history. Secretary of the Navy James V. Forrestal personally encouraged Albion to study the history of the formulation of American naval policy. As a result of this, Albion eventually published two important works: Forrestal and the Navy and Makers of Naval Policy, 1798-1947. The latter proved to be very controversial within the Navy and was long delayed in publication.

In 1948, he was appointed the first Gardiner Professor of Oceanic History and Affairs at Harvard University. There he taught a very popular undergraduate course titled "Oceanic History and Affairs", later changed to "Maritime and Naval History and Affairs", popularly referred to as 'Boats.'. He held that position until 1963, when he received emeritus status. He was succeeded to the Gardiner's chair by John H. Parry.

In 1955, Albion founded and was the first director of the Frank C. Munson Institute of American Maritime History at Mystic Seaport, a summer graduate program in which he trained and inspired many of the nation's leading maritime historians, regularly teaching there for twenty years until retiring in 1975. Albion also served as vice president of the Naval Historical Foundation and as a member of the editorial board of the Journal of Economic History and the American Neptune. Late in his career, he aught at the University of Maine.

Albion was a pioneer in the use of television for distance education. He lectured afloat for the Harvard Polaris Program and served as a visiting professor at a number of universities between 1964 and 1972, including University of Connecticut, Emory University, Carleton College and Bowdoin College.

== Later years ==
Albion lived for four years at the Groton Regency Convalescent Home in Groton, Connecticut, dying there at the age of 86. He left no immediate survivors. He is buried in the Mount Pleasant Cemetery, South Portland.

== Published works ==
- Forests and Seapower (1926, 1965, 2000)
- Introduction to military history (1929, 1971)
- Brief biographies in American history, with Jennie Barnes Pope (1930)
- Brief biographies in modern history, by Jennie B. Pope, Helen B. Clark [and] Robert G. Albion. (1930)
- Brief biographies in ancient history, by Jennie B. Pope, M.A., Robert G. Albion, Ph.D., Helen B. Clark, M.A. (1931)
- Brief biographies in medieval and early modern history, by Jennie B. Pope, M.A., Robert G. Albion, Ph.D., and Helen C. Clark, M.A. (1931)
- Visualized early European history, by J.B. Pope ... edited by Robert G. Albion (1936)
- A history of England and the British Empire, by Walter Phelps Hall and Robert Greenhalgh Albion, with the collaboration of Jennie Barnes Pope. (1937, 1946, 1971, 1984)
- Square-Riggers on Schedule (1938, 1965)
- The Rise of New York Port, 1815-1860, with the collaboration of Jennie Barnes Pope (1939, 1961, 1970, 1984)
- Sea lanes in wartime: the American experience, 1775-1942, by Robert Greenhalgh Albion and Jennie Barnes Pope (1942, 1968)
- Seaports South of the Sahara: The achievements of an American steamship service. With the collaboration of Jennie B. Pope (1959)
- Forrestal and the Navy, by Robert Greenhalgh Albion and Robert Howe Connery; with the collaboration of Jennie Barnes Pope, foreword by William T.R. Fox.
- Exploration and discovery, edited by Robert G. Albion (1965)
- Maritime and Naval History: An Annotated Bibliography 4th edition (1972)
- New England and the sea, by Robert G. Albion, William A. Baker [and] Benjamin W. Labaree. Marion V. Brewington, picture editor. (1972)
- The Atlantic world of Robert G. Albion, edited by Benjamin W. Labaree and a bibliography of the works of Robert G. Albion by Joan Bentinck-Smith; drawings by William A. Baker (1975)
- Five centuries of famous ships: from the Santa Maria to the Glomar Explorer, with a foreword by Benjamin Labaree (1978)
- The Makers of Naval Policy, 1798-1947, edited by Rowena Reed (1980)
- A supplement (1971-1986) to Robert G. Albion’s Naval & maritime history, an annotated bibliography, fourth edition, by Benjamin W. Labaree (1988)

== Honors ==
In 1948 Albion was awarded an honorary degree of Doctor of Letters by Bowdoin College. The honoris causa citation reads "(...) who beginning his career as a brilliant undergraduate editor-in-chief of the Orient has developed into one of the most eminent of American naval historians and so recognized at home and abroad; able administrator; for several years directing the summer sessions at Princeton; brought up in Portland, the beautiful town that is seated by the sea, he has written interesting books on the Merchant Marine also; representing today his class on its thirtieth reunion and gladly honored as one of the many scholars and teachers who have in the academic world bound with friendly ties Princeton and Bowdoin."

In 1975 colleagues and students of Albion came together to publish a book in his honor, The Atlantic World of Robert G. Albion. The preface states: "The year 1975 closes half a century since the publication in 1926 of Robert Greenhalgh Albion's classic study of the English navy's timber problem, Forests and Sea Power. To mark the occasion and express our respect and affection for its author, several of his colleagues and former students offer this collection of essays (...). Like Bob Albion himself, we began our respective careers with other specializations and have come to the subject of maritime history as an act of love rather than duty". Contributors included William A. Baker, Harold L. Burstyn, John H. Kemble, Benjamin W. Labaree, Archibald R. Lewis, Clark G. Reynolds, Jeffrey J. Safford, Edward W. Sloan III, Joan Bentinck-Smith.
