= J. H. Parry =

British maritime historian (1914–1982)

John Horace Parry CMG, MBE (Handsworth, Birmingham, England, 26 April 1914 – Cambridge, Massachusetts, 25 August 1982) was a distinguished maritime historian, who served as Gardiner Professor of Oceanic History and Affairs at Harvard University.

== Early life and education ==
John Parry was the son of a teacher, Walter Austin Parry and his wife Ethel Piddock. He was educated at Clare College, Cambridge, where he also completed his PhD in history in 1938. On 18 March 1938, he married Joyce Carter. Together they had three daughters and a son. His academic career was interrupted by World War II, during which he served as an officer in the Royal Navy in 1940–1945, rising to become a lieutenant-commander. He was torpedoed three times. For his war service, he was appointed as a Member of the Order of the British Empire in 1942.

== Academic career ==
Upon demobilization, Parry returned to Clare College, Cambridge, where he was tutor in history 1945–1949. He served additionally as senior proctor, 1947–48 and university lecturer in history, 1946–1949. In 1949, he was appointed professor of modern history at the newly established University College of the West Indies, Kingston, Jamaica, an appointment he held until 1956.

In 1954–55, he was visiting professor at Harvard University, then returned briefly to Jamaica before being appointed principal of University College, Ibadan, Nigeria in 1956. Parry remained in that post until 1960, when he was selected as principal of the University College of Swansea. In 1963 he became vice-chancellor of the University of Wales, Cardiff. where he remained until he was selected as Gardiner Professor of Oceanic History and Affairs at Harvard University. He was the second scholar to hold the Gardiner chair, succeeding Robert G. Albion.

While at Harvard he taught a sequence of courses devoted to sailing, European expansion, and the establishment of overseas empires. For a year following retirement, he held the Visiting Harrison Chair of History at the College of William and Mary.

== Scholarly contributions ==
His early work dealt with Spain's overseas empire, focusing on the theory and structure of colonial rule, with a series of monographs The Spanish Theory of Empire, The Audiencia of New Galicia in the Sixteenth Century: A Study in Colonial Government (1948) and The Sale of Public Office in the Spanish Indies under the Hapsburgs (1953). These were followed by works with a larger scope, Europe and a Wider World, 1415-1715 (1949), and a volume with a shorter time span and more focused, The Age of Reconnaissance, Discovery, Exploration and Settlement, 1450-1650 (1963) and a companion volume of documents, The European Reconnaissance. Selected Documents (1968). He continued in the vein of maritime empires, publishing Trade and Dominion. The European Overseas Empires in the Eighteenth Century (1971). What one scholar has called Parry's "masterpiece" is The Spanish Seaborne Empire (1966).

He died of a heart attack at his home on Wednesday 25 August 1982.

== Awards and honours ==
- Member of the Order of the British Empire, 1942
- Companion of the Order of St. Michael and St. George, 1960
- Honorary LL.D., Federal University of Ceará, 1964
- Member of the American Academy of Arts and Sciences, 1967
- Members of the American Philosophical Society, 1975
- Commander of the Order of Alfonso X of Castile, 1976

== Published works ==
- The Spanish Theory of Empire in the Sixteenth Century (1940, 1949, 1974, 1978)
- The Audiencia of New Galicia in the Sixteenth Century: A Study in Spanish Colonial Government (1948, 1968)
- The Sale of Public Office in the Spanish Indies under the Habsburgs (1953)
- Europe and a Wider World, 1415-1715 (1949, 1966); reprinted as The Establishment of the European Hegemony, 1415-1715: Trade and Exploration in the Age of the Renaissance (1961)
- A Short History of the West Indies, by J.H. Parry, P.M. Sherlock, A.P. Maingot (1956, 1960, 1963, 1971, 1987)
- The Cities of the Conquistadores (1961)
- The Age of Reconnaissance (1963, 1966, 1973); History of Civilisation series
- The Spanish Seaborne Empire (1966, 1973, 1977, 1990); The History of Human Society series
- The European Reconnaissance: Selected Documents (1968)
- Trade and Dominion: The European Oversea Empires in the Eighteenth Century (1971, 1974, 2000)
- The Discovery of the Sea (1974, 1975, 1981)
- The Discovery of South America (1979)
- Romance of the Sea (1981)
- New Iberian World: A Documentary History of the Discovery and Settlement of Latin America to the Early 17th Century, edited, with commentaries by John H. Parry and Robert G. Keith; with the assistance of Michael Jimenez (1984)
