= Handbook of Latin American Studies =

Annotated guide to publications in Latin American studies

Handbook of Latin American Studies is an annotated guide to publications in Latin American studies by topic and region, published since 1936. Its editorial offices are in the Hispanic Division of the Library of Congress. According to a Seminar on the Acquisition of Latin American Library Materials (SALALM) report, "The Handbook of Latin American Studies is the oldest and most prestigious area studies bibliography in the world." It now publishes in both print and digital format.

== Description ==
The Handbook of Latin American Studies (HLAS), a multidisciplinary bibliographic project, grew out of a 1935 meeting held at the Social Science Research Council offices in New York City. The American Council of Learned Societies provided the initial funding for the project via its Advisory Committee on Latin American Studies. Lewis Hanke, Director of the Hispanic Division of the Library of Congress, became its first editor. Clarence H. Haring of the History Department, Harvard University chaired the committee that led to the project. Funding for the project initially was provided by the American Council of Learned Societies, the Rockefeller Foundation, and the Carnegie Endowment for International Peace.

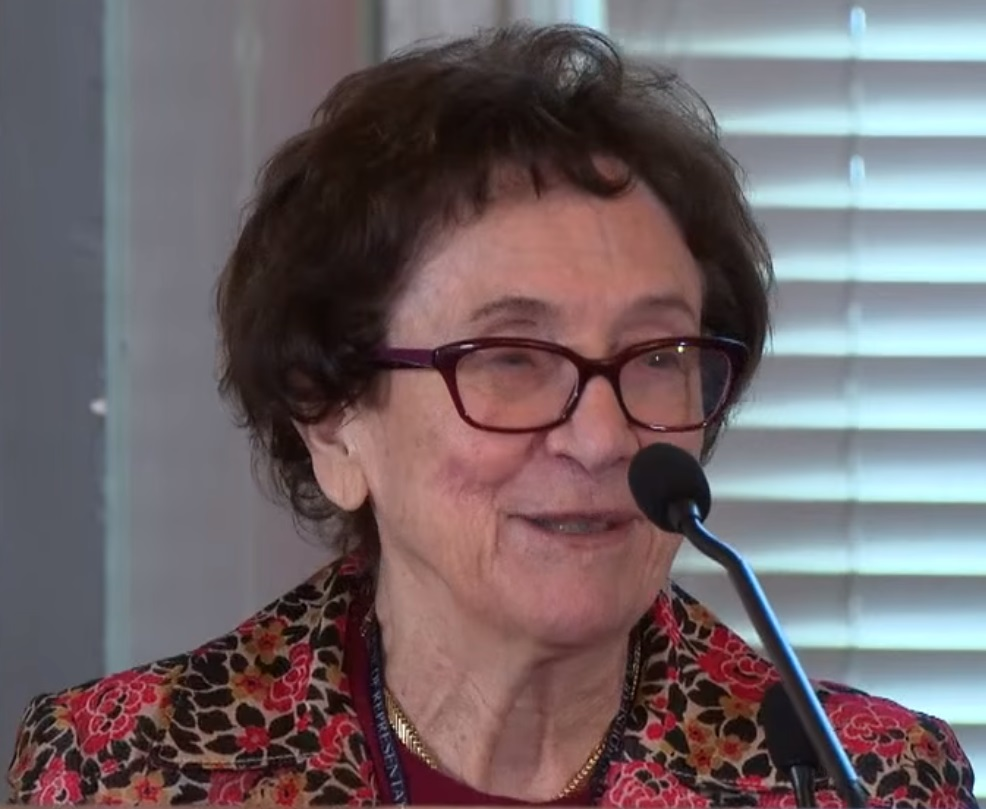
Georgette Dorn, chief of the Hispanic Division of the Library of Congress, at the 2018 Americas Awards

The bibliography of the Handbook is selective, not comprehensive, with annotated entries on the most important publications on the particular topic. Each field has an introductory overview of trends by a contributing editor. The specialists who serve as contributing editors play an important role in shaping the field. "Every evaluation that a Contributing Editor makes may have far-reaching consequences for the future of a publication," with the inclusion or exclusion of a publication and the phrasing of the annotation influencing scholars and librarians. The inclusion of sections on Brazil reflects the increased awareness in the U.S. of its importance. Under the tenure of Hispanic Foundation Director Howard F. Cline (1952–71), HLAS expanded the number of topics, with volumes alternating by year between humanities and social sciences. Ending a period of uncertainty in its funding, the Library of Congress assumed the responsibility. Since volume 50, HLAS has been published in digital format, with the Library of Congress hosting HLAS Online. Hispanic Division Director Dr. Georgette Dorn began the project of digitizing earlier print volumes of HLAS. Publications considered for inclusion are monographs, journal articles, book chapters, conference papers, websites, and maps written in English, Spanish, Portuguese, French, German, or Russian.
