= Clarence H. Haring =

American historian (1885–1960)

- Born: Clarence Henry Haring; February 9, 1885; Philadelphia, Pennsylvania, U.S.
- Died: September 4, 1960 (aged 75); Cambridge, Massachusetts, U.S.
- Education: Harvard University (BA); New College, Oxford
- Occupation: Historian
- Spouse: Helen Louise Garnsey (m. 1913)
- Children: 2
- Parent(s): Henry Getman Haring; Amelia Stoneback

Clarence Henry Haring (February 9, 1885, in Philadelphia, Pennsylvania – September 4, 1960, in Cambridge, Massachusetts) was an American historian of Latin America and a pioneer in initiating the study of Latin American colonial institutions among scholars in the United States.

== Early life and education ==
The son of a businessman, Henry Getman Haring, and Amelia Stoneback, Clarence Haring received his Bachelor of Arts degree in modern languages from Harvard University in 1907. Selected for a Rhodes Scholarship in 1907, he studied under Professor Sir Charles Harding Firth at Oxford University from 1907 to 1910, where he was a member of New College. Under Firth's guidance, Haring produced his first book on The Buccaneers in the West Indies in the XVII Century. This research laid the groundwork for Haring's lifelong work on the history of the Spanish Empire and in Latin America. While at Oxford, Haring also studied briefly at the Humboldt University of Berlin in 1909.

== Academic career ==
In 1910, Haring returned to Harvard University as an instructor in history, teaching a course in Latin American history, and began work on his doctoral dissertation on Trade and Navigation between Spain and the Indies in the Time of the Habsburgs under the direction of Professor Roger B. Merriman. In 1912, while he was still working on his dissertation, Bryn Mawr College appointed him head of its history department and in 1913, he married Helen Louise Garnsey, with whom he later had two sons, Philip and Peter.

In 1915, Haring went to Clark University for a year and, in 1916, was appointed to the history faculty at Yale University, where he remained until 1923. In 1918, after completing extensive research in the archives at Seville, Haring published his doctoral dissertation, which had been awarded the David A. Wells Prize at Harvard for the best dissertation in economics.

In 1923, Harvard University appointed him the Robert Woods Bliss Professor of Latin American History, named after a U.S. ambassador to Argentina prior to World War I; Haring held the post until he retired from Harvard thirty years later in 1953. While at Harvard, he played a key role in the newly emerging field of Latin American history by training a whole generation of Latin American historians, including Lewis Hanke, Howard F. Cline, Arthur P. Whitaker, and Miron Burgin. Haring published on a variety of topics during his long career, though he was best known for his two major institutional studies. A point of pride was his post as Master of Dunster House, which had a tradition of "individualism and of a strong interest in historical studies." While at Harvard, he served as chairman of the Committee on Latin America for the American Council of Learned Societies from 1932 to 1942 and worked on a joint committee on Latin America of the Social Science Research Council. In 1935, he organized the Bureau of Economic Research at Harvard and, in the same year, served as a delegate to the Second General Assembly of the Pan American Institute for Geography and History. An enduring legacy was his involvement in the Handbook of Latin American Studies (HLAS), a major bibliographic tool for scholars, published annually with the aid of staff in the Hispanic Foundation (later Hispanic Division) at the Library of Congress, begun when Haring's former graduate student Lewis Hanke was director. Such a tool was particularly important in the pre-digital age before the development of electronic library catalogs, with area contributing editors selecting publications for inclusion, along with short summaries. In 1936, Haring wrote an essay for the preface of the first volume of the HLAS, emphasizing that the bibliographic listings were the core of the project, but that "important bibliographical review articles will be included, summarizing recent progress on significant topics or pointing out where further research may be profitable be made."

Appointed professor emeritus at Harvard, the United States Naval War College invited him to take up its chair in maritime history for the academic year 1953–54. While Haring was occupying this academic post, the Secretary of the Navy formally named it, giving its occupants the title of Ernest J. King Professor of Maritime History in honor of Fleet Admiral Ernest King. In 1955, Haring was visiting professor at the University of Puerto Rico.

In 1953, he was awarded by the Academy of American Franciscan History their highest honor, the Junipero Serra Award. The citation written by Fr. Alexander Wyse of the academy is a summary of Haring's importance. "The large number of experts whom [Dr. Haring] trained in his more than forty years as a teacher...bears witness to the importance of his work and the scope of his beneficent influence. Lest his own objectives of inter-American friendship perish with him, he has meanwhile happily given them indestructible form in a small shelf of outstanding publications. In addition, he has engaged in several missions in the interests of inter-American harmony and has taken part in many inter-American learned assemblies -- and ambassador of good will whose devotion to the truth has ever enhanced his prestige in those other Americas. Affiliated with half a score scholarly institutions in the Latin American world, and decorated by several of our sister republics, he enjoys a reputation that transcends the boundaries of our country. He truly is an honored citizen of that supranational community dedicated to truth, learning and understanding." In an obituary in the Hispanic American Historical Review by one of his former students, he was praised for "his complete integrity, ready charm, and first-rate mind [that] made him an outstanding personality among the Latin Americanists of his day, as well as a chief supporter of high standards of scholarship in this new guild."

A group of Haring doctoral students had wanted to present a festschrift for their mentor, but difficulties ensued, and they sought another way to honor him. Following Haring's death in 1960, the American Historical Association established the Clarence H. Haring Prize in Latin American History, awarded every five years to the best book by a Latin American author.

== Published works ==
- The Buccaneers in the West Indies in the XVII Century (1910)
- Trade and Navigation between Spain and the Indies in the Time of the Habsburgs (1918)
- South American Progress (1934)
- The Spanish Empire in America (1947)
- Empire in Brazil (1958)
