= Frank C. Munson Institute of American Maritime History =

Graduate-level marine science institute

The Frank C. Munson Institute of American Maritime History was established at Mystic Seaport, Connecticut, in 1955 to provide graduate-level summer courses in maritime history. The name was later changed to the Munson Institute of Maritime Studies, to include literature and other aspects in the history of maritime affairs. Mrs. Cora Mallory Munson, widow of Frank C. Munson endowed the Institute, named in memory of her husband, who had been president of the Munson Steamship Line and a major figure in the American shipping industry in the first and second World Wars. The curator of Mystic Seaport, Edouard A. Stackpole, originated the idea for the institute and turned to Professor Robert G. Albion, Gardiner Professor of Oceanic History and Affairs at Harvard University to join with him in creating the Institute and to serve as its first director.

Since its founding, the Munson Institute has been the leading, and often the sole, center for the teaching of maritime history in the United States. Its faculty has included the leading maritime historians in the United States. In 1996, 2006, 2010, 2012, and 2014, the National Endowment for the Humanities awarded it grants to run summer institutes to teach maritime history to college and university faculty members in a national effort to further develop this field. In 1998, the Munson Institute's faculty produced the first wide-ranging maritime history of the United States, America and The Sea: A Maritime History.

The Institute annually awards the Hardin Craig Memorial Prize for academic excellence.

== Directors ==
1. 1955 - 1974 Professor Robert G. Albion
2. 1974 - 1996 Professor Benjamin Woods Labaree
3. 1996 - 2001 Professor John Hattendorf
4. 2001 - Pres. Dr. Eric Roorda and Dr. Glenn Gordinier
