= Georgette Dorn =

Hungarian-born American academic (1934–2026)

Georgette Magassy Dorn
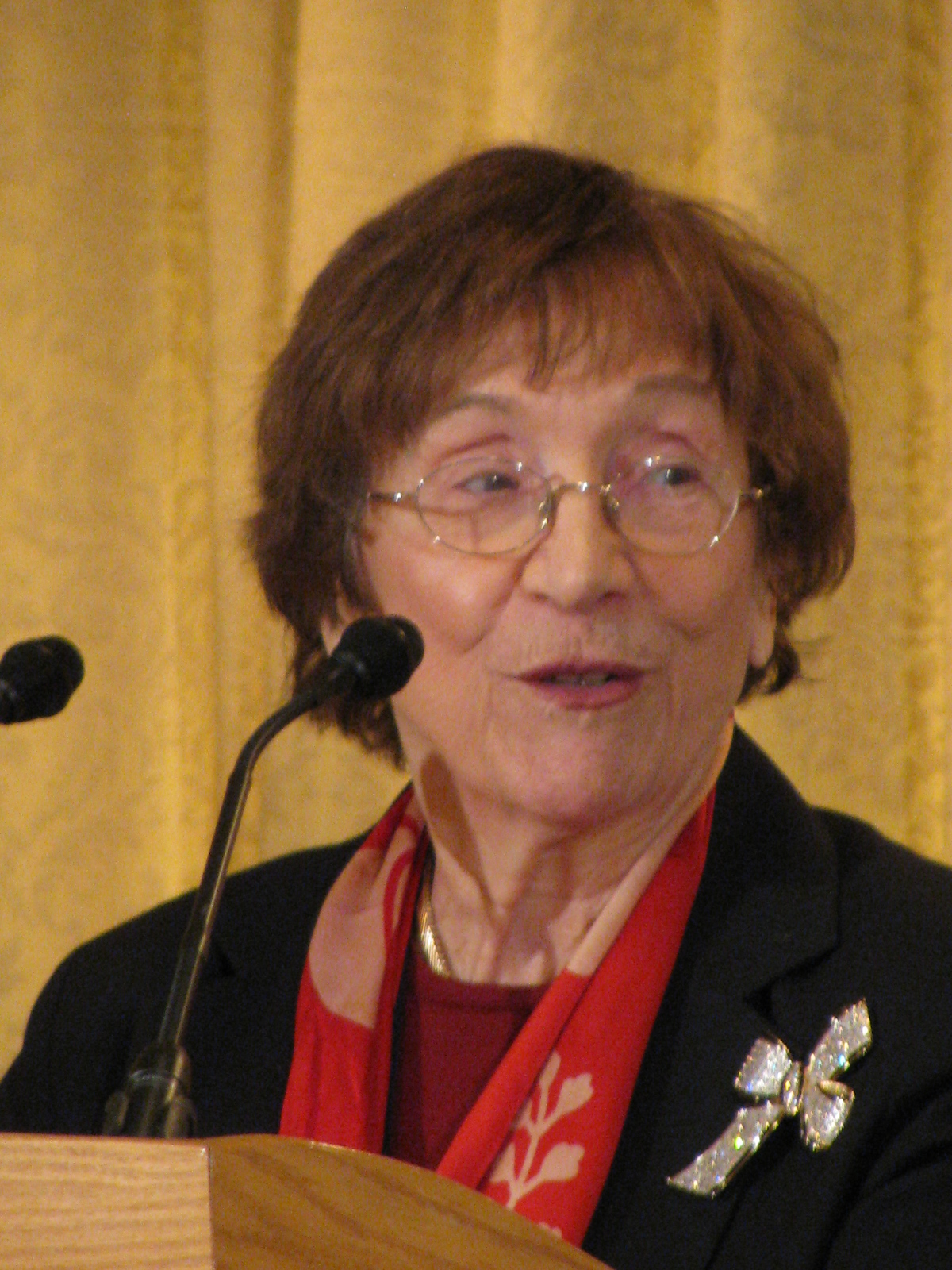
- Dorn at the Library of Congress in 2014
- Born: August 13, 1934; Budapest, Hungary
- Died: April 20, 2026 (aged 91)
- Occupation: Chief of the Library of Congress' Hispanic Division

Georgette Magassy Dorn (August 13, 1934 – April 20, 2026) was a Hungarian-born American academic in the field of Latin American studies. She served from 1994 to 2018 as chief of the Library of Congress' Hispanic Division.

== Early life and education ==
Georgette Magassy was born in Budapest, Hungary, in 1934. Her father was a prominent doctor, and her family was Catholic. After Germany occupied Hungary in 1944, she was brought by her mother toward the Austrian border; her family later ended up in a displaced persons camp in Germany.

Once the war was over, her father arranged to resettle in Argentina in 1947, and the rest of the family joined him three years later. There, Georgette completed grade school in Buenos Aires.

After beginning her college education at the University of Buenos Aires, she immigrated in 1956 to the United States, where she graduated in 1959 with a bachelor's in government from Creighton University. She then obtained a master's in history from Boston College in 1961. That year, she met and married Paul Dorn, with whom she had four children.

Dorn later obtained a PhD in history from Georgetown University in 1981, focusing her dissertation on the Argentine politician Lisandro de la Torre.

== Career ==
In 1962, Dorn joined the Library of Congress as a cataloger of texts in Hungarian and German, eventually becoming a reference librarian and then, in 1969, the curator of the library's Archive of Hispanic Literature on Tape. In the latter role, which she held until her retirement, she worked to record samples from more than 500 Spanish- and Portuguese-language writers.

Then, in 1994, she became chief of the Hispanic Division at the Library of Congress. In this role, she worked to expand the division's collections and increase their accessibility, including by digitizing the Handbook of Latin American Studies. She also spent 2005–2017 as acting chief of the European Division.

From 1982 to 2002, Dorn lectured in Georgetown's history department and Center for Latin American Studies. At Georgetown, she taught the first classes on women in Latin American history, as well as courses on race in Latin America.

Dorn wrote numerous articles in the field of Latin American studies. In 1996, she was the associate editor of the The Encyclopedia of Latin American History and Culture.

== Later life and death ==
Dorn retired from the Library of Congress in 2018. She died on April 20, 2026, at the age of 91.

== Awards and honors ==
In 2006, she was honored with the Order of Isabella the Catholic for her promotion of Spanish culture.
