= Annie's =

Annie's or Annies may refer to:

- Annie's Homegrown, a maker of organic foods (or Annie's Naturals, a condiments brand within the company)
- Annie Award for film animation
- Annie's Bay, Bermuda

== See also ==
- Annys (disambiguation)
- Annie (disambiguation)
