= Sandbagger sloop =

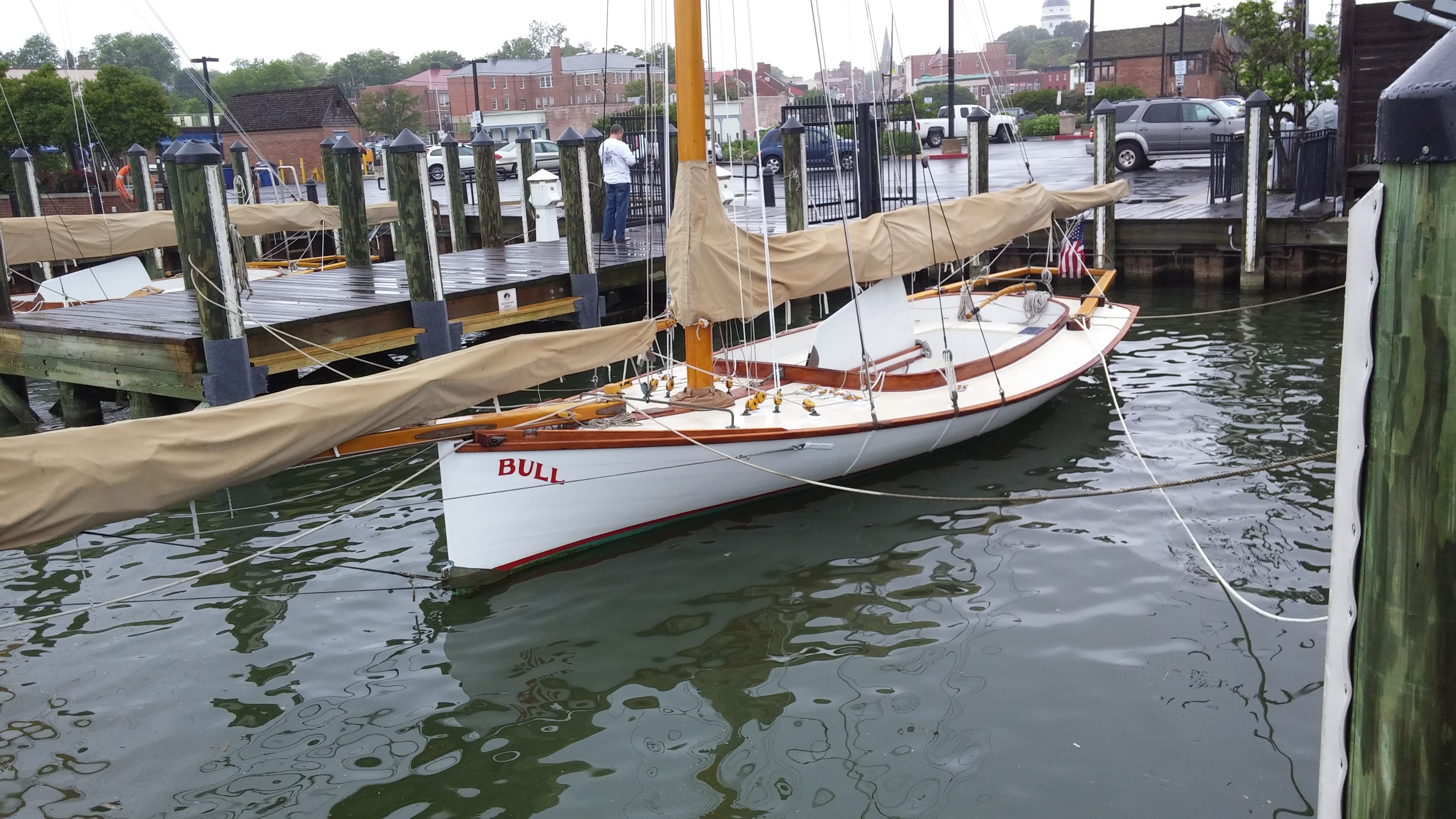
The "Sandbagger sloop" Bull, in Chesapeake Bay

A sandbagger sloop is a type of sailboat made popular in the 19th century as a work vessel which also could be used as a pleasure craft. They are a descendant of shoal-draft sloops used in oyster fishing in the shallow waters of New York Bay The term "sandbagger" refers to the use of sandbags to shift the boat's center of gravity in order to obtain the most power from the sails. In practice, the sandbags were actually filled with gravel in order to keep them from retaining excessive amounts of water.

The vessels could be anywhere from 20' to 30' feet in length, but with a sail area disproportionate to their size. They were crewed by between 10 and 15 men.

An excellent example of a sandbagger is the sloop Annie, which is maintained by the Mystic Seaport maritime museum.
