= Annys =

Annys is a surname. Notable people with the surname include:

- Maxime Annys (born 1986), Belgian footballer and manager
- Eddy Annys (born 1958), Belgian high-jumper
- Cilou Annys (born 1991), Belgian model and beauty pageant contestant

== See also ==
- Annie's (disambiguation)
