= Florence (dragger) =

Coordinates: 41°21′45″N 71°57′55″W

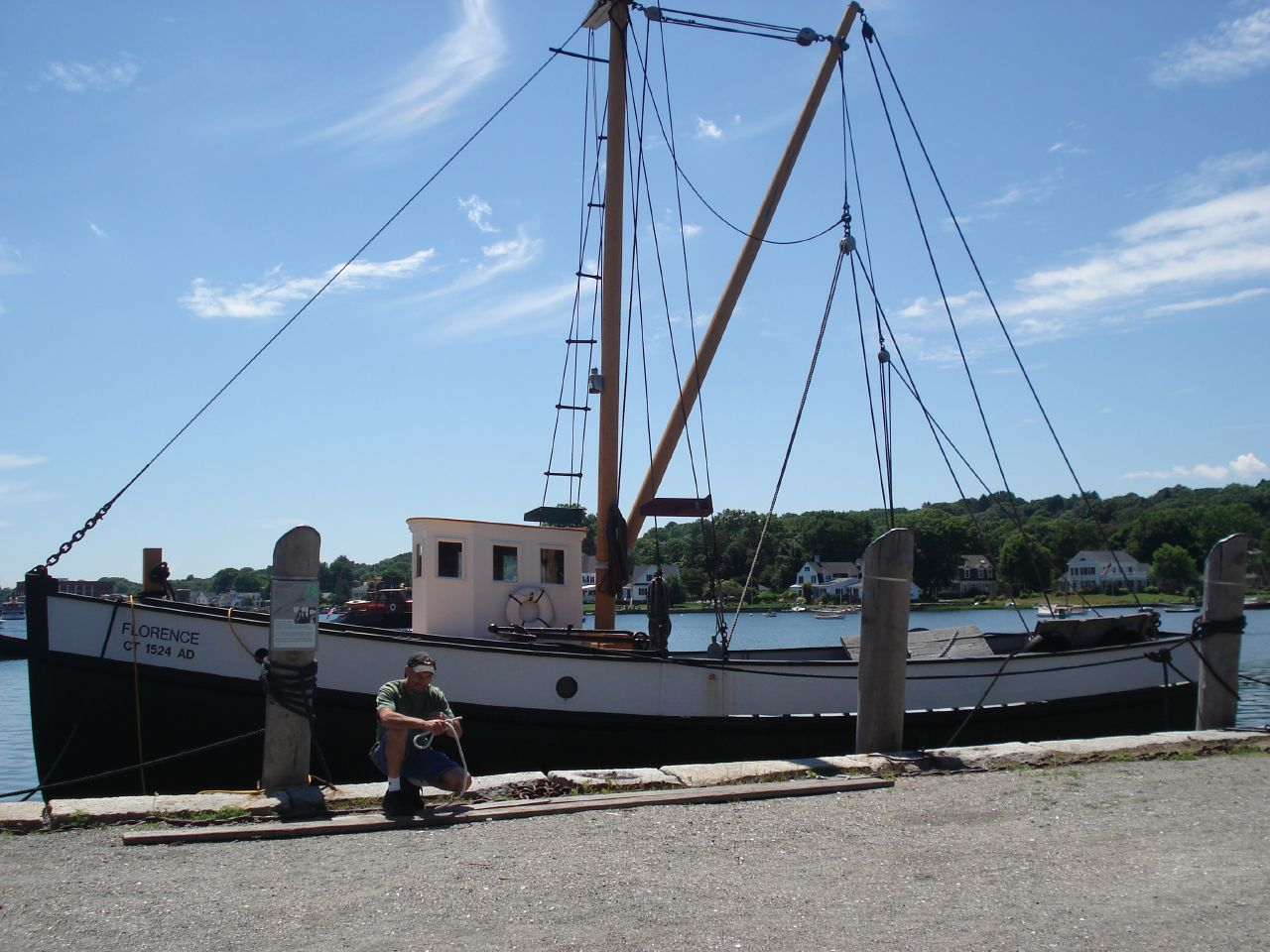
- Florence

History

United States
- Builder: Franklin G. Post
- Completed: 1926
- Status: Operational museum ship

General characteristics
- Installed power: Gray Marine 6-71

Florence is a western rig dragger located at Mystic Seaport in Mystic, Connecticut, United States. Florence was built in 1926 by Franklin G. Post along the Mystic River and was used as a dragger in Long Island Sound. In 1982 Florence was acquired by Mystic Seaport and completely restored to her original configuration. Florence is the only working dragger in a museum collection. Florence is now used to carry students to collect marine biology specimens from Fishers Island Sound.
