= Francis Russell Hart Nautical Museum =

Coordinates: 42°21′30.74″N 71°05′35.34″W

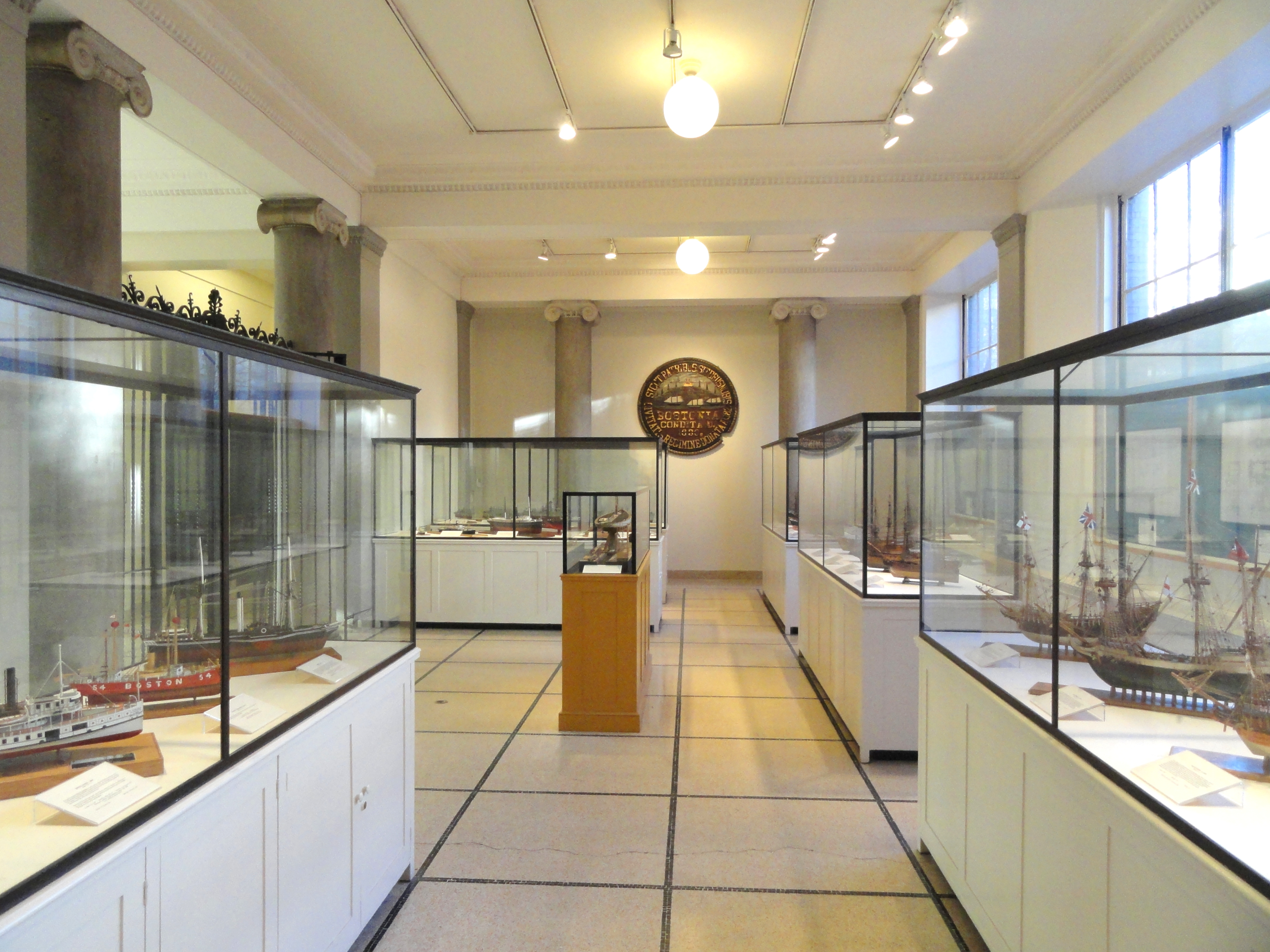
Hart Nautical Gallery

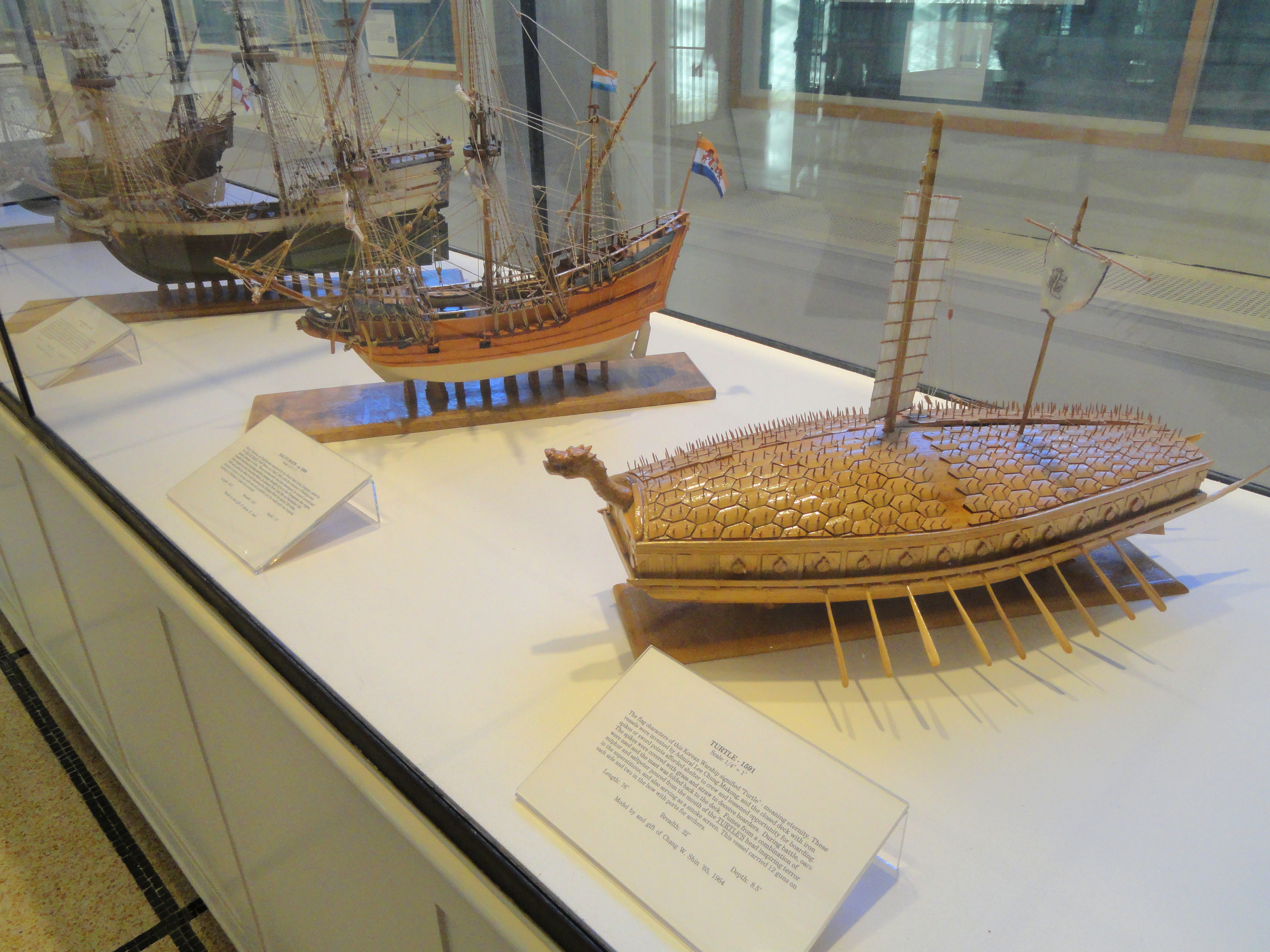
Display of ship models

The Hart Nautical Gallery is a gallery in the MIT Museum at Massachusetts Institute of Technology, Cambridge, Massachusetts, United States. The collections include construction drawings of the Doris sailing yacht, designer William Hand’s surviving drawings, and material relating to shipbuilder Jacob Aaron Westervelt.

== History ==
The original Francis Russell Hart Nautical Museum was established in 1922 at MIT as part of the Department of Naval Architecture and Marine Engineering. It was incorporated into the MIT Museum in 1982. William A. Baker, a maritime historian, was curator of the museum from 1963 until his death in 1981.

== See also ==
- List of maritime museums in the United States
