= Lewis Hanke =

American historian (1905–1993)

- Born: January 2, 1905; Oregon City, Oregon, U.S.
- Died: March 26, 1993 (aged 88); Amherst, Massachusetts, U.S.
- Education: Northwestern University (BS, MA); Harvard University (PhD)
- Occupation: Historian
- Known for: Writings on the Spanish conquest of Latin America
- Spouse: Kate Gilbert Hanke (died 1993)

Lewis Hanke (January 2, 1905 – March 26, 1993) was an American historian of colonial Latin America best known for his writings on the Spanish conquest of Latin America. Hanke presented a revisionist narrative of colonial history that focused on the role of Bartolomé de las Casas, who famously advocated for the rights of Native Americans, and searched for just resolutions to the tensions between the conquistadores and the natives during the colonial period of Spanish rule. Hanke's writings documented Las Casas' work as a political activist, historian, political theorist, and anthropologist. His scholarship also uncovered evidence to support Hanke's claim that Las Casas did not act as the sole voice of conscience during the colonial era, but actually constituted the head of what was a larger reform movement by a number of Spanish colonists to prevent "the destruction of the Indies.”

== Biography ==
Born January 2, 1905, in Oregon City, Oregon, Hanke received his B.S. and M.A. in history from Northwestern University. He went on to complete his PhD from Harvard University in 1936. He served as the first chief of the Hispanic Division of the Library of Congress, and headed the Hispanic Foundation until 1951. He began his teaching career at the University of Texas, then moved on to Columbia University. Hanke later joined the faculty of the University of Massachusetts Amherst in 1969, where he remained until his retirement in 1975.

To many, Hanke is considered the father of the field of Latin American studies in the United States. He created the Handbook of Latin American Studies, and that, along with his considerable historiographical achievements in Latin American history, continue to figure among the foundational works of Latin American studies research and library collections in both the U.S. and abroad.

Hanke edited the Guide to the Study of US History Outside the US, 1945–1980, and the year before his retirement, he served as the president of the American Historical Association, where he oversaw the re-writing of the AHA's charter.

Hanke died in Amherst, Massachusetts, on March 26, 1993, eight days after the death of his wife, Kate Gilbert Hanke. She was "la Querida Compañera de Mi Vida."

== Career ==
At Harvard, Hanke studied under Clarence H. Haring. During that time, Hanke published the first of his works on Bartolomé de las Casas, Las teorías políticas de Bartolomé de Las Casas and The First Social Experiments in America: A Study of the Development of Spanish Indian Policy in the Sixteenth Century. In 1936, Hanke graduated from Harvard with a degree in history. Unable to get an academic job during the Great Depression, Hanke was appointed director of the Hispanic Foundation of the Library of Congress in 1939, where he served for 12 years. His most influential work, The Spanish Struggle for Justice in the Conquest of America (1949), argues that “… the Spanish conquest of America was far more than a remarkable military and political exploit; that it was also one of the greatest attempts the world has seen to make Christian precepts prevail in the relations between peoples." This underscores Hanke's idealistic view of Las Casas, and cuts against the prevailing narrative, then and now, of the Spanish colonists as a uniformly exploitative, hostile force vis à vis the Native Americans. Hanke went on to pen works that continued to explore the concept of "the Spanish struggle for justice", as well as on topics ranging from the city of Potosi to the Good Neighbor policy.

== Awards and accolades ==
In 1974, Hanke was elected president of the American Historical Association, the first Latin Americanist to hold the position. In 1989, Hanke received the Kalman Silvert Award from Latin American Studies Association, and in 1992, was honored with the Antonio de Nebrija Fifth Centenary Special Prize from the University of Salamanca.

== Major works ==
- The Spanish Struggle for Justice in the Conquest of America (1949)
- Aristotle and the American Indians: A Study in Race Prejudice in the Modern World (1959)
- All Mankind Is One: A Study of the Disputation Between Bartolome De Las Casas and Juan Gines De Sepulveda in 1550 on the Religious and Intellectual Capacity of the American Indians (1974)
- Latin America, a Historical Reader (1974)
- Selected Writings of Lewis Hanke on the History of Latin America (1979)
- Guide to the Study of United States History Outside the U.S., 1945–1980 (1985)
- People and Issues in Latin American History: From Independence to the Present (1990)
- People and Issues in Latin American History: The Colonial Experience (1993)
