= Bahama 30 =

Sailboat class

Development
- Designer: Robert Finch
- Location: United States
- Year: 1973
- Builder: Islander Yachts

Boat
- Displacement: 8,230 lb (3,733 kg)
- Draft: 5.00 ft (1.52 m)

Hull
- Type: Monohull
- Construction: Fiberglass
- LOA: 29.92 ft (9.12 m)
- LWL: 24.58 ft (7.49 m)
- Beam: 10.00 ft (3.05 m)
- Engine: Volvo MD7A 13 hp (10 kW) diesel engine

Hull appendages
- Keel: fin keel
- Ballast: 3,130 lb (1,420 kg)
- Rudder: internally-mounted spade-type rudder

Rig
- Rig type: Bermuda rig
- I foretriangle height: 40.00 ft (12.19 m)
- J foretriangle base: 12.80 ft (3.90 m)
- P mainsail luff: 33.80 ft (10.30 m)
- E mainsail foot: 11.50 ft (3.51 m)

Sails
- Sailplan: Masthead sloop
- Mainsail area: 194.35 sq ft (18.056 m^{2})
- Jib/genoa area: 256.00 sq ft (23.783 m^{2})
- Total sail area: 450.35 sq ft (41.839 m^{2})

The Bahama 30 is an American sailboat that was designed by Robert Finch as a cruiser and first built in 1973.

The Bahama 30 shares the same hull design as the Islander 30 Mk II.

== Production ==
The design was built by Islander Yachts in the United States, from 1973 to 1986, but it is now out of production.

== Design ==
The Bahama 30 is a recreational keelboat, built predominantly of fiberglass, with wood trim. It has a masthead sloop rig, a raked stem, a reverse transom, an internally mounted spade-type rudder controlled by a wheel and a fixed fin keel. It displaces 8,230 lb (3,733 kg) and carries 3,130 lb (1,420 kg) of lead ballast.

The boat has a draft of 5.00 ft (1.52 m) with the standard keel fitted. There was also an optional shoal draft keel.

The boat is fitted with a Swedish Volvo MD7A diesel engine of 13 hp (10 kW). The fuel tank holds 20 U.S. gallons (76 L; 17 imp gal) and the fresh water tank has a capacity of 25 U.S. gallons (95 L; 21 imp gal).

The design's galley is on the port side, at the foot of the companionway steps. It has a two-burner alcohol-fueled stove and an insulted icebox, which can also be accessed from the cockpit. The head is across the beam and just aft of the bow "V"-berth. It includes a shower. There is a double main cabin berth from the converted settee and a starboard quarter berth. The interior trim is teak, while the cabin sole is teak and holly. The cabin headliner is vinyl. There is a forward hanging locker and a forepeak storage compartment. Ventilation is provided by four opening ports and a forward translucent hatch.

There are genoa tracks, main and jib winches, slab reefing and internal halyards along with a topping lift.

The design has a hull speed of 6.64 kn (12.30 km/h).

== See also ==
- List of sailing boat types
