= Leigh 30 =

Sailboat class

Development
- Designer: Chuck Paine
- Location: United States
- Year: 1979
- No. built: 19
- Builder: Morris Yachts
- Name: Leigh 30

Boat
- Displacement: 9,100 lb (4,128 kg)
- Draft: 4.60 ft (1.40 m)

Hull
- Type: Monohull
- Construction: Fiberglass
- LOA: 30.00 ft (9.14 m)
- LWL: 23.33 ft (7.11 m)
- Beam: 9.75 ft (2.97 m)
- Engine: Westerbeke 13 hp (10 kW) diesel engine

Hull appendages
- Keel: long keel
- Ballast: 4,400 lb (1,996 kg)
- Rudder: keel-mounted rudder

Rig
- Rig type: Bermuda rig
- I foretriangle height: 36.50 ft (11.13 m)
- J foretriangle base: 12.33 ft (3.76 m)
- P mainsail luff: 31.67 ft (9.65 m)
- E mainsail foot: 12.33 ft (3.76 m)

Sails
- Sailplan: Cutter rig
- Mainsail area: 195.25 sq ft (18.139 m^{2})
- Jib/genoa area: 225.02 sq ft (20.905 m^{2})
- Total sail area: 420.27 sq ft (39.044 m^{2})

Racing
- PHRF: 192 (average)

The Leigh 30 is an American sailboat that was designed by Chuck Paine as a cruiser and first built in 1979.

The Leigh 30 design is also known as the Morris 30 and is similar to the Victoria 30, both Paine designs. The Victoria 30 was built by Victoria Yachts in England.

== Production ==
The design was built by Morris Yachts in Bass Harbor, Maine, United States. The company built 19 examples of the design, starting in 1979, but it is now out of production.

== Design ==
The Leigh 30 is a recreational keelboat, built predominantly of fiberglass, with wood trim. It has a cutter rig, a raked stem, a canoe transom, a keel-mounted rudder controlled by a tiller and a fixed long keel with the forefoot cutaway. A wheel was optional. It displaces 9,100 lb (4,128 kg) and carries 4,400 lb (1,996 kg) of lead ballast.

The boat has a draft of 4.60 ft (1.40 m) with the standard keel fitted.

The boat is fitted with a Westerbeke diesel engine of 13 hp (10 kW) for docking and maneuvering. The fuel tank holds 18 U.S. gallons (68 L; 15 imp gal) and the fresh water tank has a capacity of 37 U.S. gallons (140 L; 31 imp gal).

The boats were built with a variety of lower deck layouts, but typical is a galley on the port side with a two-burner kerosene stove, top-loading ice box and a sink with manual water pump. The head is located just aft of the bow "V"-berth, with a hanging locker opposite. There is additional sleeping accommodation in the main cabin, with a starboard pilot berth, a settee and very small port side berth. The wood used in the interior is pine and mahogany, with additional painted wood. Teak is employed above decks.

Ventilation is provided by nine bronze ports that open, plus two hatches, one over the main cabin and the other in the bow.

The cockpit has two main winches, plus a halyard winch and additional sheeting winch on the coach house roof. There are inboard genoa tracks and a bow roller for a CQR anchor on the bow.

The design has a PHRF racing average handicap of 192 and a hull speed of 6.47 kn (11.98 km/h).

== Operational history ==
In a review Richard Sherwood wrote, "the Leigh is moderate displacement, but the ballast/displacement ratio is 48 percent and she is stiff. The high freeboard is extended by bulwarks, making for a dry boat. The keel is moderately long, the forefoot cut away, and the sail plan balanced, so she should steer easily."

== See also ==
- List of sailing boat types
