= Edouard A. Stackpole =

Edouard A. Stackpole (December 7, 1903 – September 2, 1993) was an American journalist, museum curator, whaling historian and writer.

== Works ==
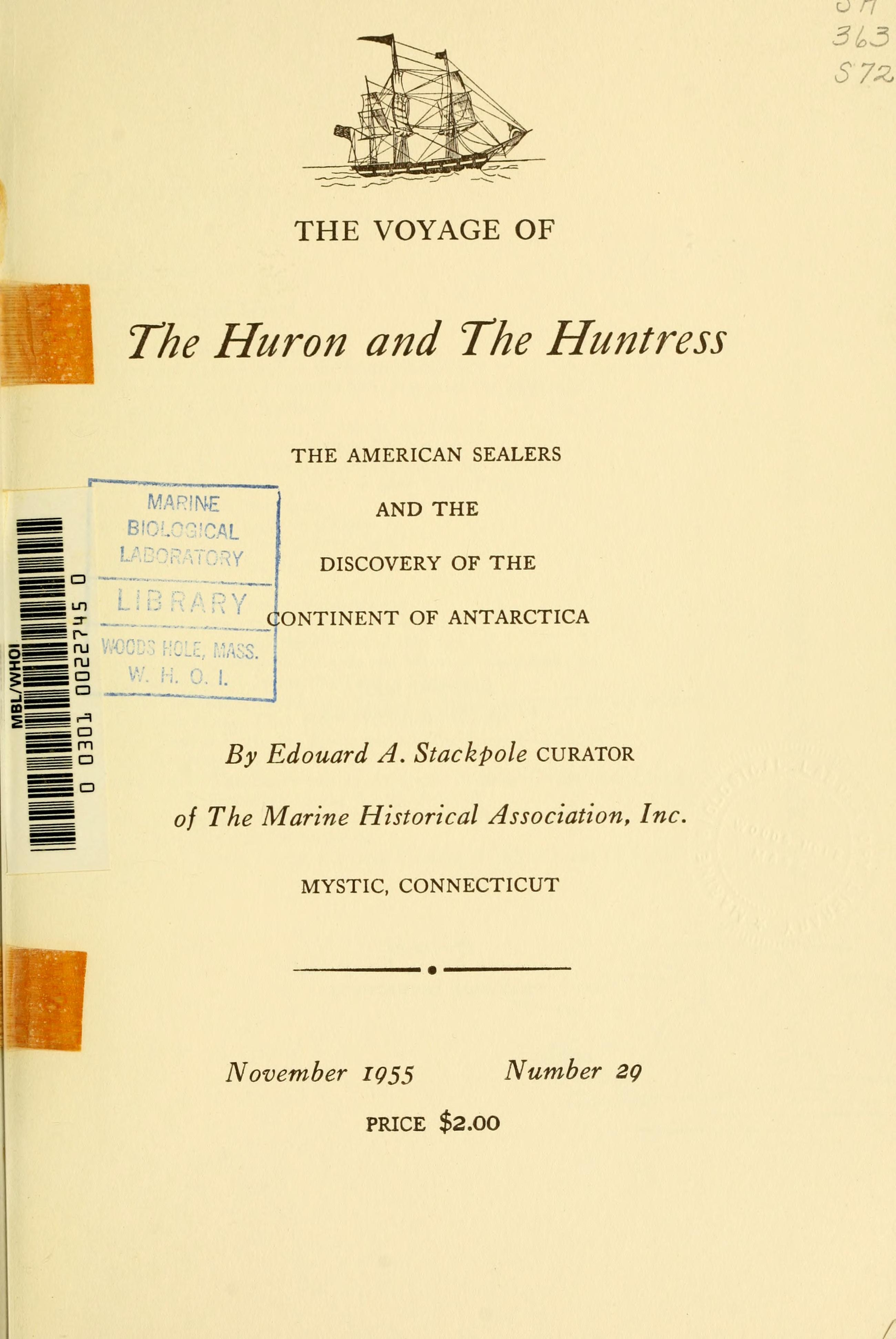
The voyage of the Huron and the Huntress (1955)

- 1931 Smuggler's Luck
- 1932 You Fight for Treasure!
- 1935 Madagascar Jack
- 1937 Privateer Ahoy!
- 1939 Mutiny at Midnight
- 1946 The Robbery of The Nantucket Bank: An Island Mystery of 150 Years Ago. Published by Inquirer and Mirror April, 1946
- 1949 Rambling Through the Streets and Lanes of Nantucket
- 1950 William Rotch (1734–1828) of Nantucket
- 1953 The Sea Hunters
- 1954 Captain Prescott and the Opium Smuggle
- 1954 The wreck of the Steamer San Francisco
- 1955 The Voyage of the Huron and the Huntress
- 1958 Dead Man's Gold
- 1958 Scrimshaw at Mystic Seaport
- 1959 Small Craft at Mystic Seaport
- 1962 The Loss of the Essex
- 1962 Those in Peril on the Sea
- 1963 Nantucket Rebel
- 1964 Figureheads & Ship Carvings at Mystic Seaport
- 1967 The Charles W. Morgan
- 1968 The Old Nantucket Gaol
- 1972 Whales & Destiny
- 1973 Nantucket in Color
- 1974 Nantucket Doorways
