= List of storms named Annie =

The name Annie has been used for three tropical cyclones worldwide: one each in the Australian region, South Pacific Ocean, and South-West Indian Ocean.

In the Australian region:

- Cyclone Annie (1973) – a Category 2 tropical cyclone

In the South Pacific:

- Cyclone Annie (1967)

In the South-West Indian:

- Tropical Storm Annie (1968) – a severe tropical storm
