= Annie (sloop) =

American sandbagger sloop (1880)

Coordinates: 41.36256°N 71.96491°W

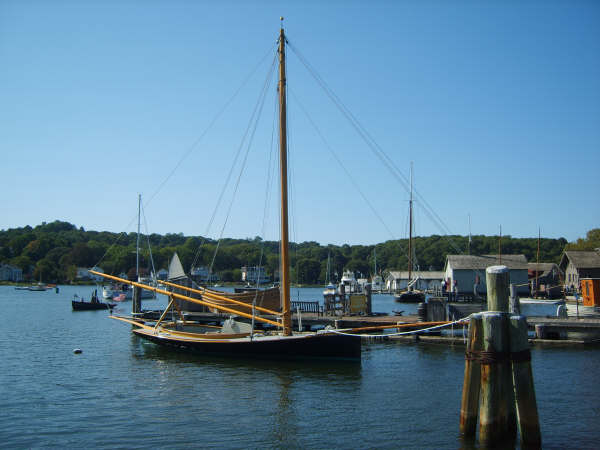
- Annie

History

United States
- Owner: Mystic Seaport
- Builder: David O. Richmond
- Completed: 1880
- Status: Museum ship

General characteristics
- Length: 28 ft (8.5 m)
- Propulsion: Sail
- Sail plan: Sandbagger sloop

Annie is a Sandbagger sloop located at Mystic Seaport in Mystic, Connecticut, United States. Built in 1880 in Mystic by David O. Richmond, Annie was built for Henry H. Tift and was used for competitive racing. Annie was donated to Mystic Seaport in 1931 and was the first vessel in their collection of watercraft. In 2004, she underwent an extensive restoration to return her to her original configuration.

== See also ==
- Annie 30, a sailboat design with the same name
