= Gardiner Professor of Oceanic History and Affairs =

The Gardiner Chair of Oceanic History and Affairs was established at Harvard University in 1948.

The chair is named in honor of William Howard Gardiner (died, New York City, 21 June 1952), a publicist and advocate of the importance of sea power, who had been President of the United States Navy League from 1928 to 1933. In this position, Gardiner played an important role in ending the policy of Herbert Hoover's administration for a "holiday" in naval construction. During World War II, Gardiner served as a consultant to President Franklin D. Roosevelt and to the State Department on global policy.

In 1918, Gardiner married Mary Ruth McBurney, who shared her husband's interest in naval affairs. On her death in 1947, she left more than $250,000 to Harvard University to endow the Gardiner Chair in Oceanic History and Affairs. In her will, she specified that the endowment was to be used for the study and teaching of the geography and history of the sea and of the ships that sail on or above it, "particularly as they have affected or may affect the security and progress of the United States in view of the mid-oceanic and insular position of North America relative to other lands."

== List of the Gardiner Professors of Oceanic History ==
- 1948–1965 Robert G. Albion
- 1965–1982 J. H. Parry
- 1982–2001 in abeyance
- 2001–present Sugata Bose
