= Mystic Seaport =

Maritime museum in Mystic, Connecticut

Mystic Seaport Museum

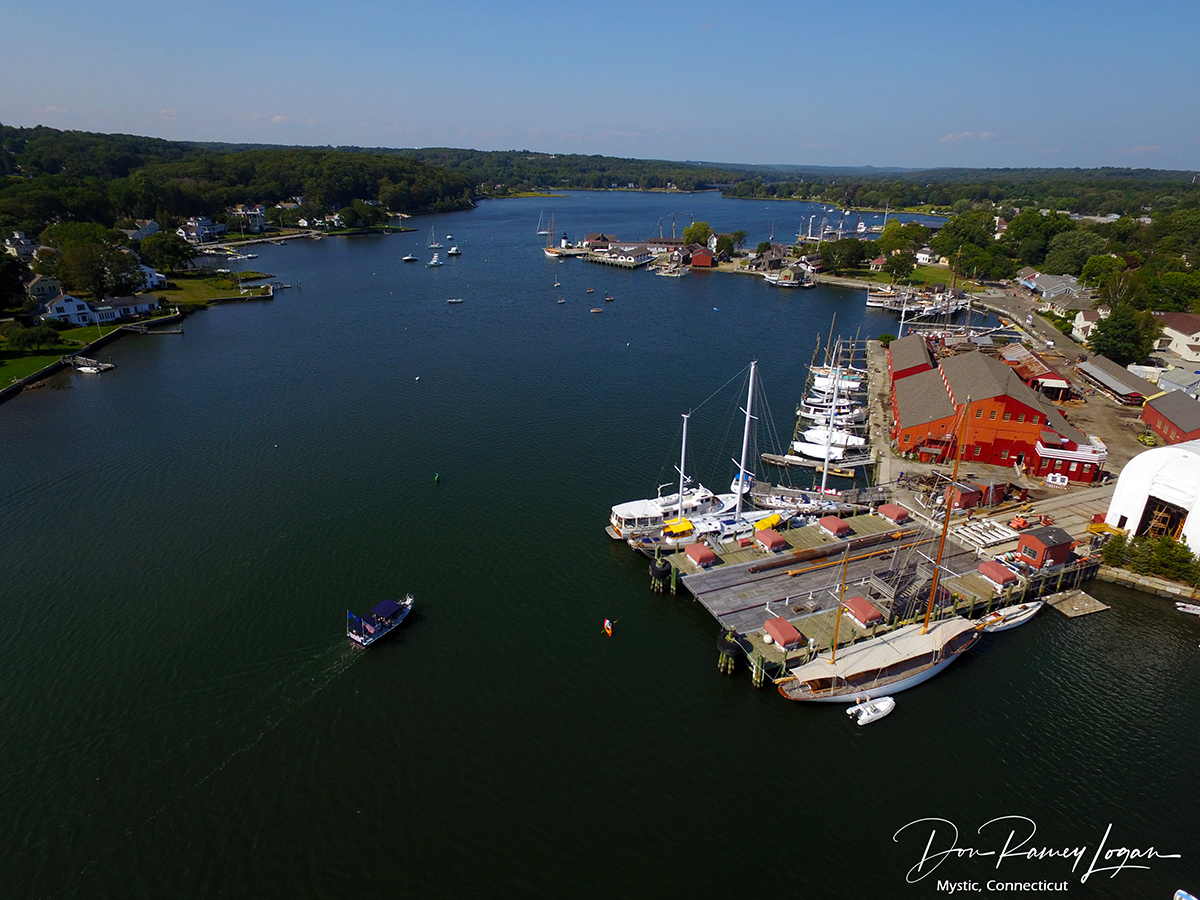
- View from the Mystic River Estuary
- Established: 1929
- Location: Mystic, Connecticut
- Coordinates: 41°21′41″N 71°57′52″W
- Type: Maritime museum • history museum
- Visitors: 250,000 (2023)
- Public transit access: SEAT: 10
- Website: www.mysticseaport.org

Mystic Seaport Museum (founded as Marine Historical Association) is a maritime museum in Mystic, Connecticut, and the largest in the United States. Its 19-acre (7.7 ha) site holds a collection of ships and boats and a re-creation of a 19th-century seaport village consisting of more than 60 historic buildings, including many rare commercial structures that were moved to the site and meticulously restored. As of 2016, the museum received about 250,000 visitors each year.

== History ==
The museum was established in 1929 as the Marine Historical Association. One founder was philanthropist Mary Stillman Harkness, daughter of the only surviving child of Mystic shipbuilder Thomas Stillman Greenman. Harkness initially donated land that had belonged to her grandfather; in 1945, she would donate his house to the museum as well.

The museum was one of the first living history museums in the United States, with a collection of buildings and craftsmen to show how people lived. It gained fame with its 1941 acquisition of the Charles W. Morgan, the only surviving wooden whaling ship.

In 1955, maritime history professor Robert G. Albion of Harvard University established the Frank C. Munson Institute of American Maritime Studies, a summer graduate-level academic program.

== Grounds and programs ==
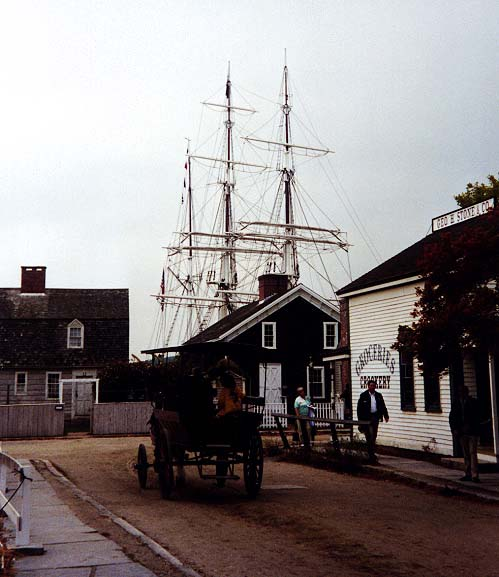
Street in Mystic Seaport, masts of Charles W. Morgan in background

The Henry B. du Pont Preservation Shipyard is an important part of the museum, where traditional tools and techniques are used to preserve the museum's collection of historic vessels, including the Charles W. Morgan. A replica of the slave ship La Amistad was constructed in the shipyard and launched in 2000. Amistad departed New Haven on June 21, 2007, on a 14,000-mile transatlantic voyage to Great Britain, Lisbon, West Africa, and the Caribbean, marking the Atlantic trade and slave route to commemorate the 200th anniversary of the end of the slave trade in Great Britain.

The 19th-century seafaring village contains nearly all the types of general and specialized trades associated with building and operating a sailing fleet. They include a chandlery, sail loft, ropewalk, cooperage, shipping agent's office, printing office, bank, and others. Also included is The Spouter Tavern, which is open seasonally and serving "travelers' fare". Each building is used to show the original activity and also to display examples of what was sold or constructed; the nautical instrument shop, for example, displays sextants, nautical timepieces, and so forth, while demonstrations at the cooperage show how casks were assembled.

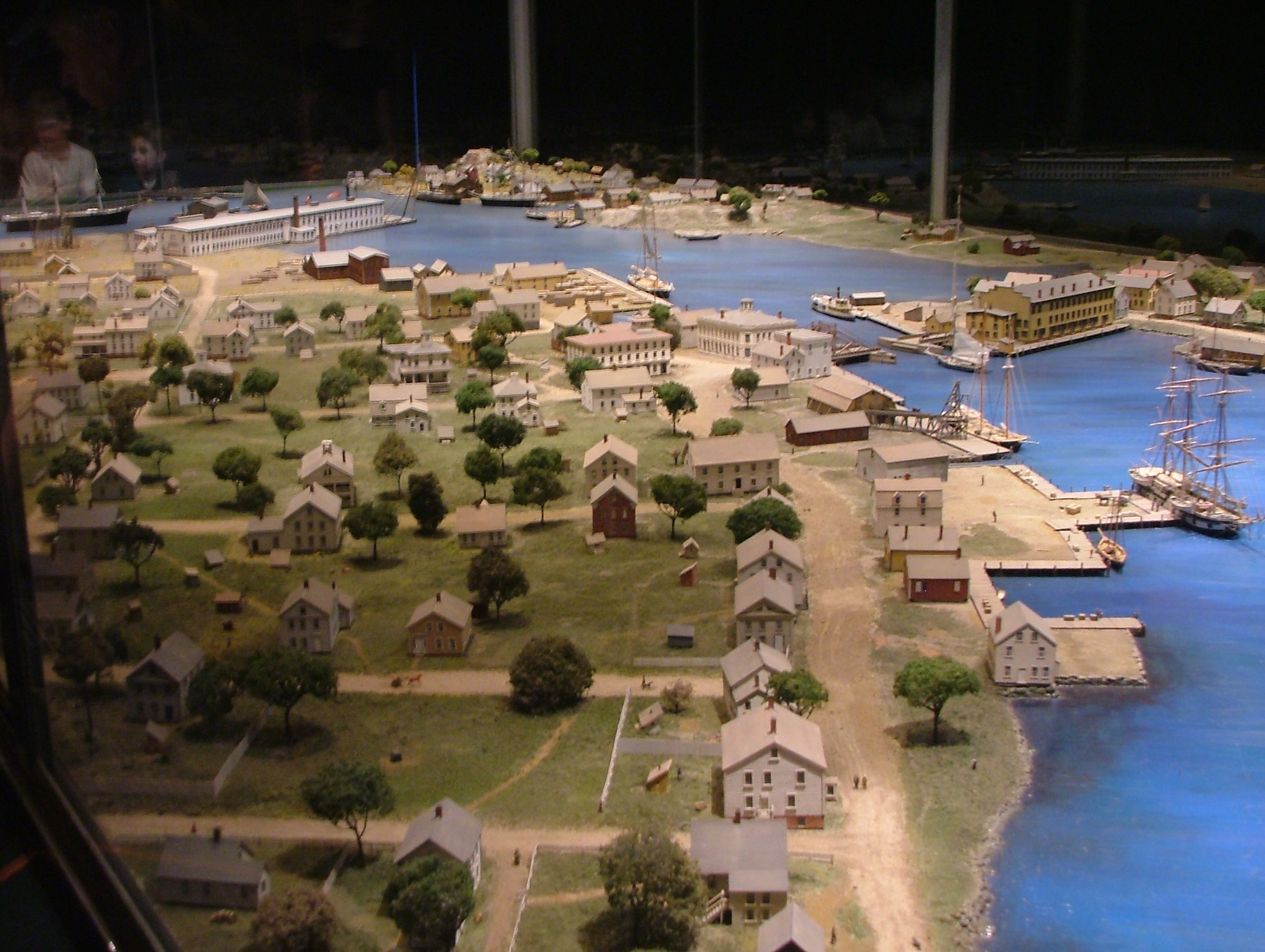
Scale model of Mystic, Connecticut as it was around 1870

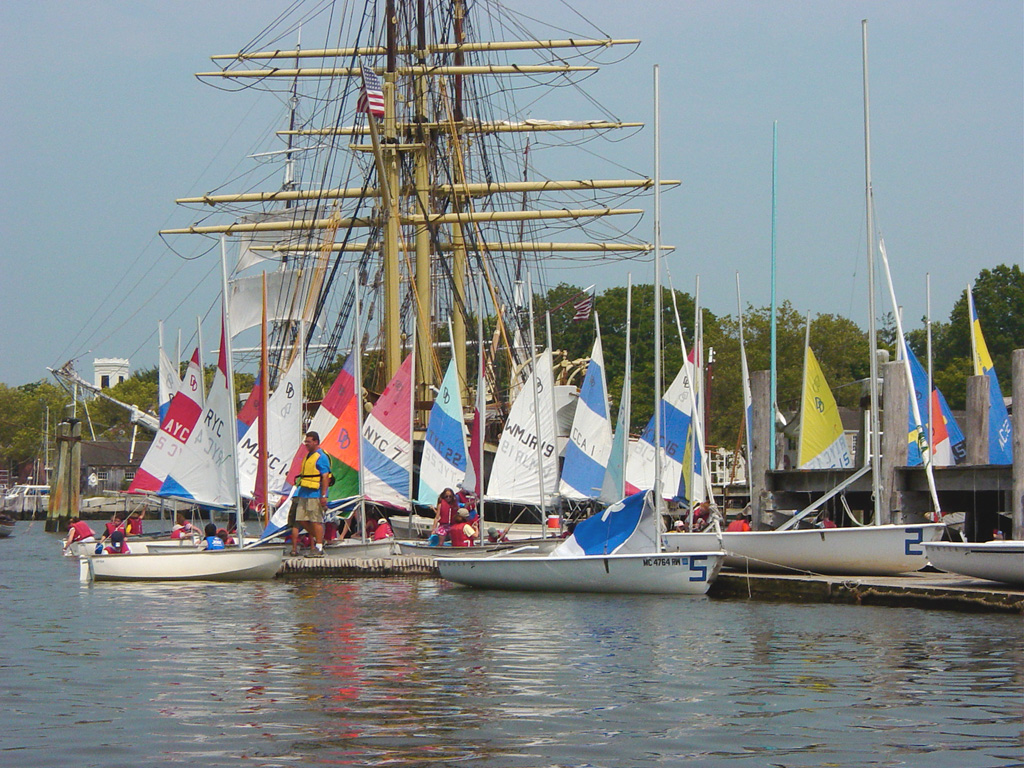
Children learning to sail in JY15s and Dyer Dhows

Additional buildings house more exhibits. A 40-foot, 1/128 scale model of the Mystic River area as it appeared around 1870, complete down to the outhouses that stood behind every residence. Another contains a collection of carved ship figureheads. Also among the museum's buildings is the Treworgy Planetarium which demonstrates how seamen used stars for navigation.

Sailing instruction is also offered, as well as tourist rides in various historical small craft that allow views of historic ships at their moorings. Mystic Seaport's music program features sea shanties in their original contexts as work songs.

The Seaport supports research via an extensive library.

With Williams College, the museum hosts Williams–Mystic, an undergraduate program in maritime studies.

Outreach includes sailing and history classes for area children.

== National Historic Landmarks ==
Four vessels at Mystic Seaport are recognized by the United States government as National Historic Landmarks:

Vessel	Image	Type	Overall length	Built	Description
Emma C. Berry		well smack	39 ft	1866	Emma C. Berry is the last surviving American well smack (also called Noank smacks). Well smacks originated in England about 1775 and were designed to keep the catch alive in an internal water-filled compartment known as a wet well. Seawater circulated through large holes in the bottom planking. She was donated to Mystic Seaport in 1969 and was declared a National Historic Landmark in 1994.
L. A. Dunton		fishing schooner	123 ft	1921	L. A. Dunton was built in Massachusetts and is among the last of the larger fishing vessels that were powered solely by sail. She was named after Louis A. Dunton, a sailmaker who was a member of the syndicate that commissioned her construction. She was worked in the New England fisheries until 1934 and then in the Newfoundland cod fishery of the Grand Banks into the 1950s. In 1955, she was converted for use as a coastal cargo boat. She was acquired by Mystic Seaport in 1963 and restored to her original condition. Dunton was declared a National Historic Landmark and listed on the National Register of Historic Places in 1993.
Charles W. Morgan		whaler	113 ft	1841	Charles W. Morgan is a whaling ship which was active for 80 years. She is the only surviving wooden whaler from 2,700 ships that operated in the United States whaling fleet. On her deck are huge try pots used to render blubber into whale oil. She came to Mystic Seaport in 1941 and was designated a National Historic Landmark in 1966.
Sabino		island steamer	57 ft	1908	Sabino is a small wooden, coal-fired steamboat and is one of only two surviving members of the United States mosquito fleet. She was declared a National Historic Landmark in 1992. Mystic Seaport acquired her after she became obsolete in 1974. The seaport has operated her as a working exhibit ever since, making her America's oldest regularly operating coal-powered steamboat.

== Other vessels ==
Vessel	Image	Type	Overall length	Built	Description
Annie		sandbagger sloop	28 ft	1880	Annie was used for competitive racing. She was donated to Mystic Seaport in 1931 and became the first vessel in the collection. She was extensively restored in 2004.
Breck Marshall		cat boat	20 ft	c. 1900	The Breck Marshall is a replica constructed in 1987 of Cape Cod catboats used for pleasure and fishing around 1900. The working catboat is used the warmer months to carry sight-seeing passengers on the historic Mystic River, sailing either from Middle Wharf or from the Boathouse.
Brilliant		auxiliary schooner	61 ft	1932	Brilliant was built to a high standard as an ocean racing yacht. She crossed the Atlantic Ocean in just over 15 days on her maiden voyage, a record for a sailing yacht of her size. Subsequently, she did a run in England from the Lightship Nantucket to Bishop Rock Light. During World War II, she was acquired by the U.S. Coast Guard, equipped with machine guns, and used to patrol the New England coast for enemy submarines. She was donated to Mystic Seaport in 1957, where she is used as an offshore classroom.
Estella A.		Friendship Sloop	34 ft	1904	Estella A. is a classic friendship sloop built in Maine. She was acquired by Mystic Seaport in 1957 and restored in 1970–72.
Florence		dragger	40 ft	1926	Florence is a western rig dragger built in 1926 along the Mystic River. She was used to trawl for fish at the bottom of Long Island Sound, dragging a conical net. In 1982, she was acquired by Mystic Seaport and restored to her original configuration. Florence is the only working dragger located in a museum collection. She is now used to carry students to collect marine biology specimens from Fishers Island Sound.
Gerda III		lighthouse tender	40 ft	1926	Gerda III was built in 1928 in Denmark as a lighthouse tender, though she appears to have been used as a common work boat. In 1943, she was used to smuggle Jews from Nazi-occupied Denmark to Sweden. Approximately 300 Jews were rescued by Greda III, and the Danish Parliament donated her to the Museum of Jewish Heritage. Mystic Seaport helps care for the boat and features her as part of their collection.
Joseph Conrad		training ship	111 ft	1882	Joseph Conrad is named after author Joseph Conrad. She is an iron-hulled and fully rigged sailing ship which was used to train sailors in Denmark. She sailed around the world as a private yacht in 1934, then served as a training ship in the United States. She was acquired by Mystic Seaport in 1947, and although she no longer goes to sea, she still fulfill's her original purpose as a training ship for the Mystic Mariner Program and the museum's educational programs.
Kingston II		harbor tugboat	44 ft	1937	Kingston II served U.S. Navy submarine-manufacturer Electric Boat in Groton, Connecticut for 42 years, until deemed surplus after EB turned to nuclear submarines, too large for this small tugboat. The tugboat is one of the earliest all-welded vessels, having been constructed from scrap steel by apprentice welders training to work on submarines. Came to Mystic Seaport in 1980.
Nellie		oyster or shoal-draft sloop	36 ft	1891	Nellie was built in New York and was used for oyster dredging in Long Island Sound. Mystic Seaport acquired her in 1964.
Regina M.		carry-away sloop	45 ft	c. 1900	Regina M. was built in 1900 in Passamaquoddy Bay and was used to collect herring from fish weirs and transport them to canneries on shore. Mystic Seaport acquired the vessel in 1940, and she was restored in 1992 to the way that she looked in 1909.
Roann		dragger	60 ft	1947	Roann is an eastern rig dragger built in Maine in 1947 and used to fish for flounder, cod, and haddock. Mystic Seaport acquired the vessel after she became obsolete in the 1970s. In 2009, Roann underwent complete restoration.
Star		Fishing vessel	34 ft	1950	Star was built in Connecticut for swordfishing and tuna fishing off Long Island. She was acquired by Mystic Seaport in 1976 and has undergone major restoration.

== Gallery ==
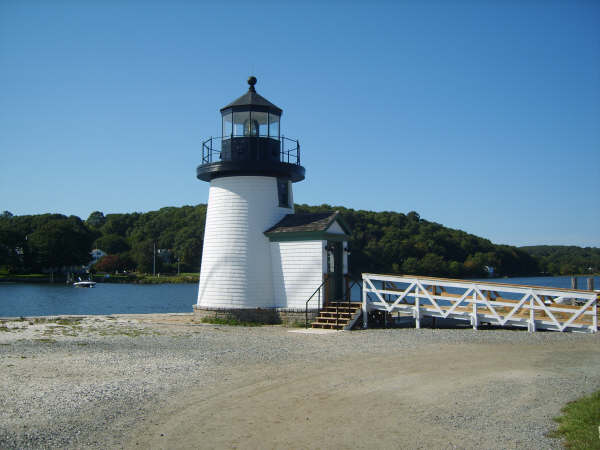
Mystic Seaport Light

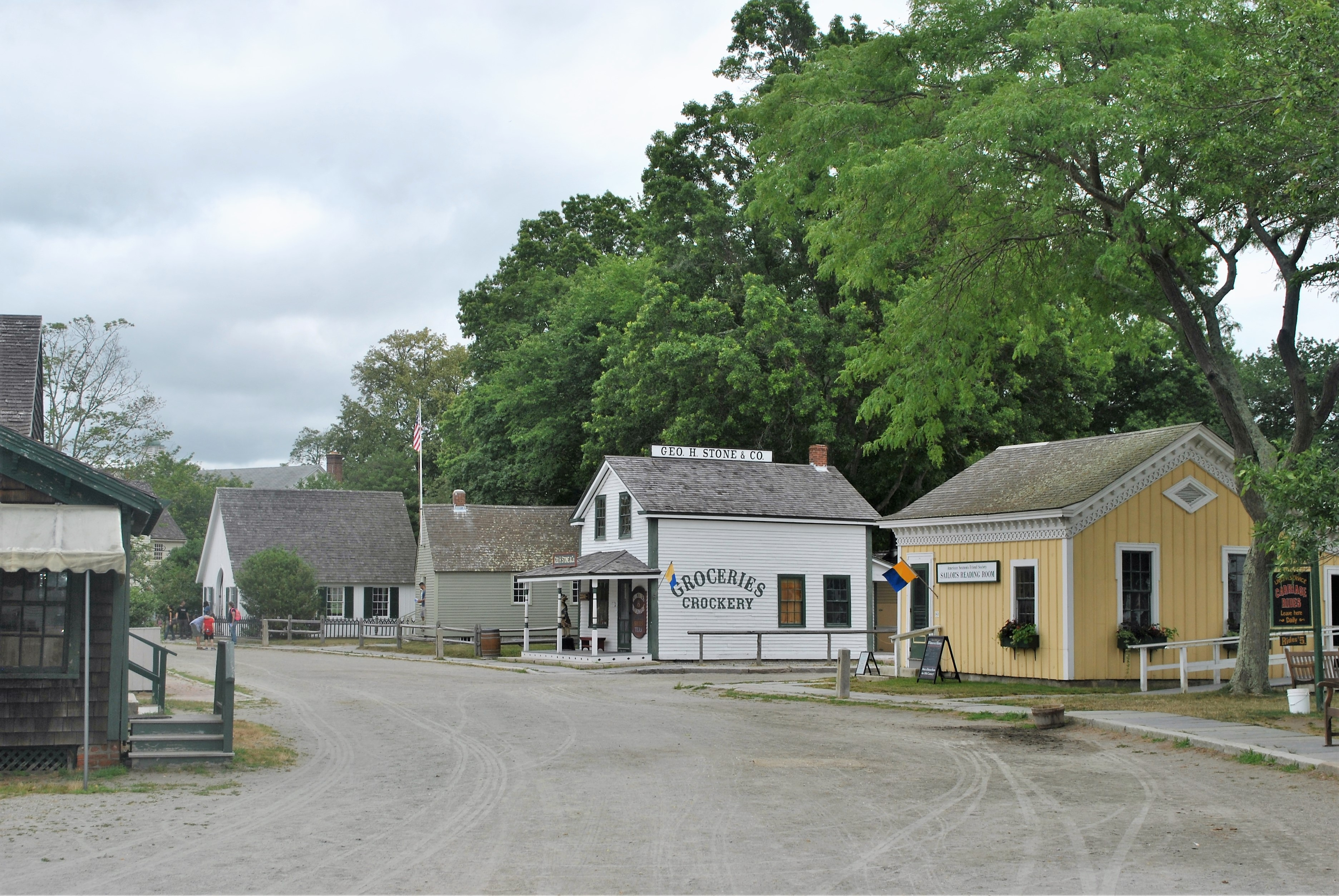
Collection of historic buildings

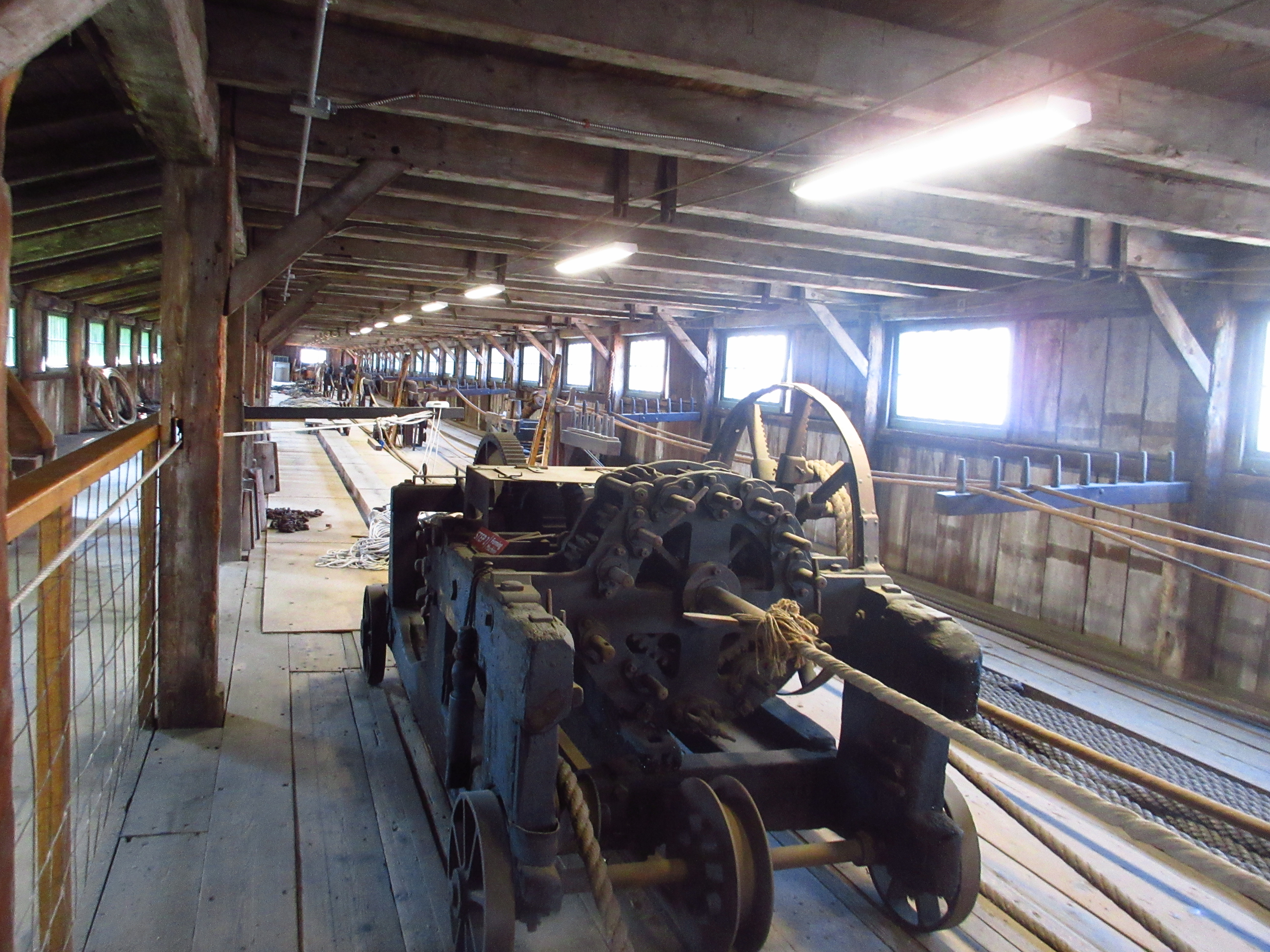
1824 ropewalk

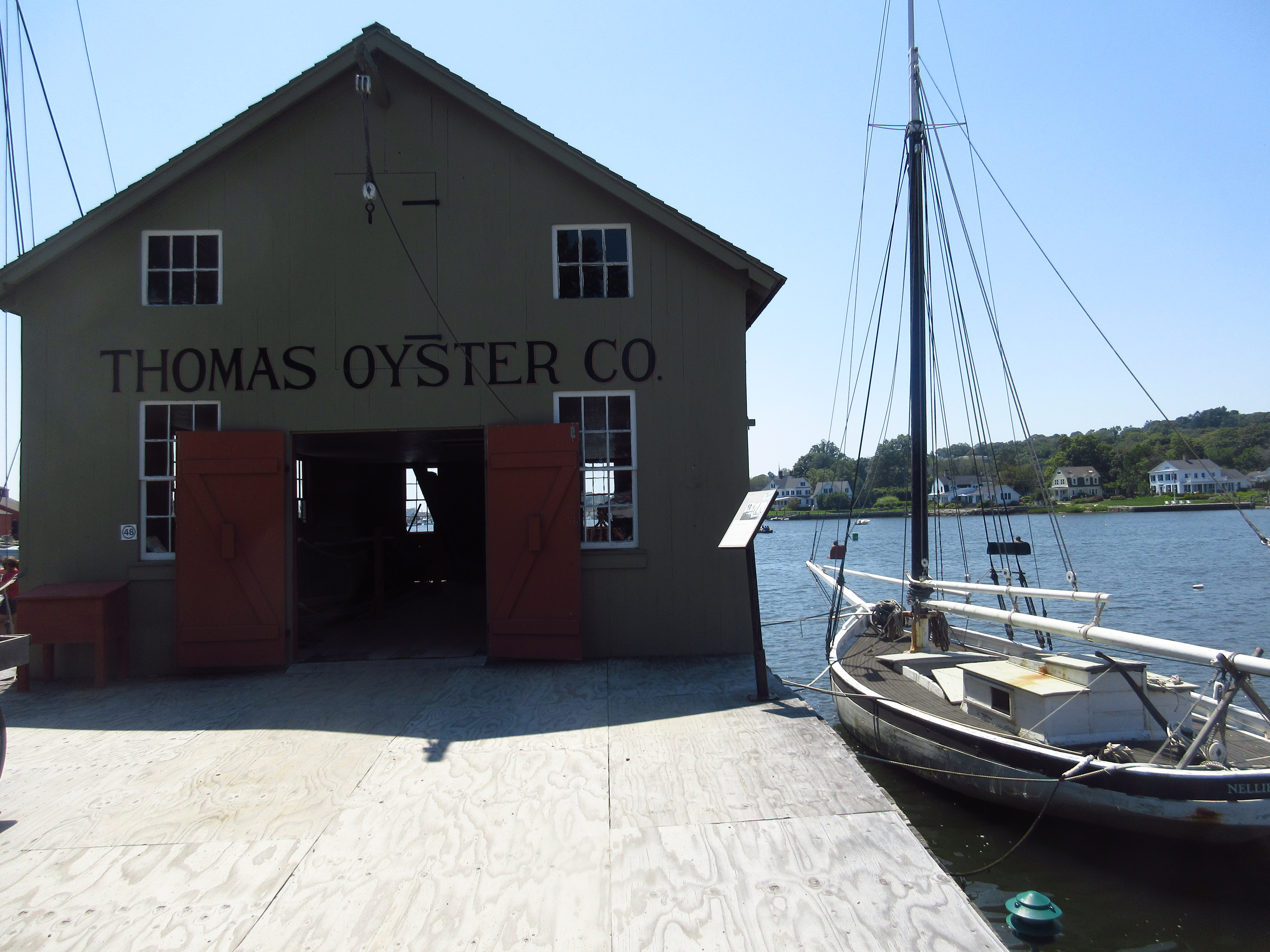
1874 oyster house

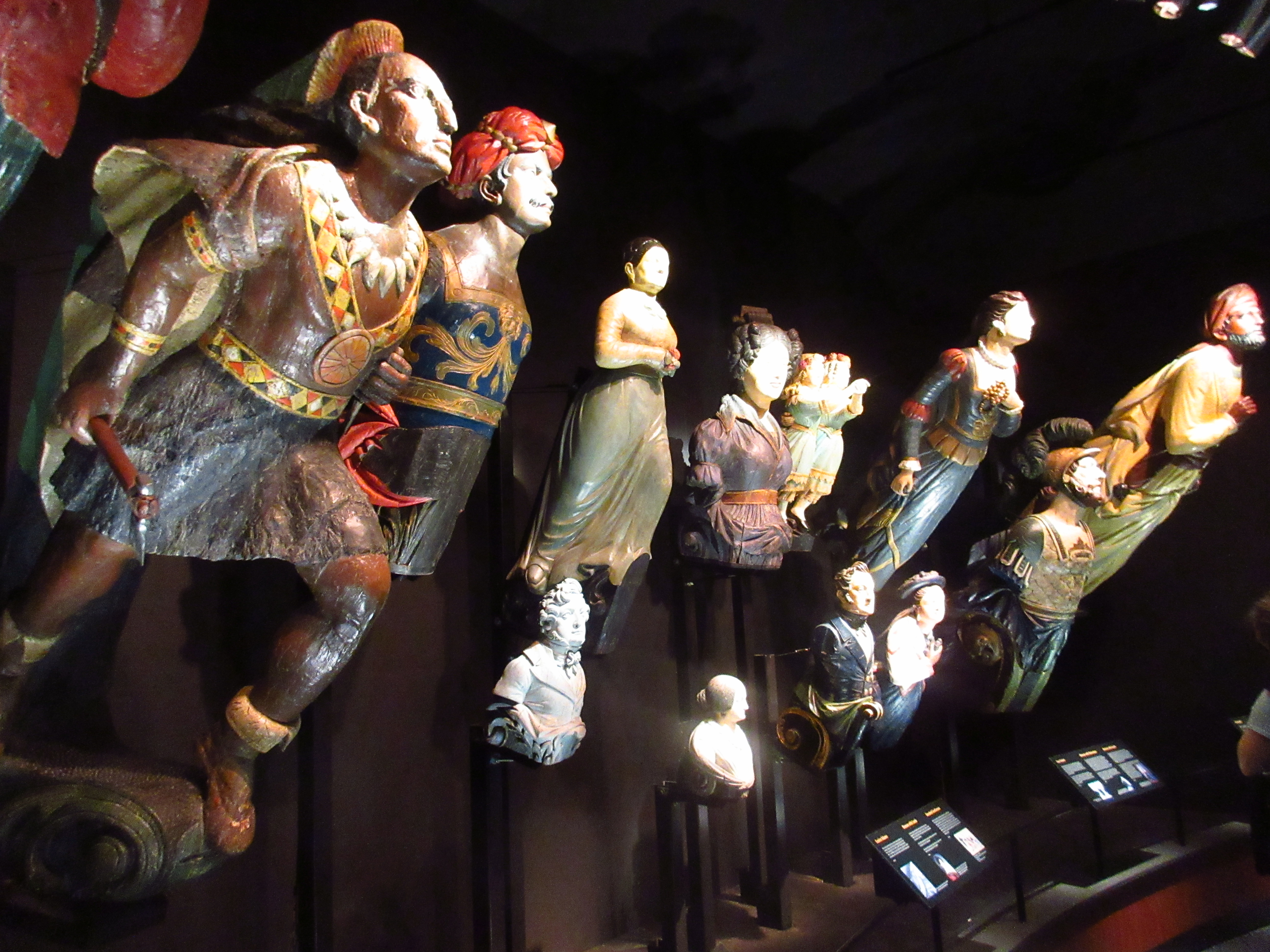
Carved vessel figureheads

== See also ==
- List of maritime museums in the United States
- List of museum ships
- Captain Joseph Warren Holmes
- Whaleboat
- John Faunce Leavitt, former curator of Mystic Seaport.
