= Willem F. J. Mörzer Bruyns =

Dutch historian of navigational science

- Willem Mörzer Bruyns in 1983 on the expedition vessel Plancius in the North Atlantic Ocean.
- Born: Gosforth, Northumberland, United Kingdom
- Citizenship: United Kingdom, Netherlands
- Occupations: historian, author
- Writing career
- Language: Dutch, English
- Years active: 1972 -

Willem Fredrik Jacob Mörzer Bruyns (born 1943 in Gosforth, Northumberland, United Kingdom) is a Dutch historian of navigational science, specializing in the history of navigational instruments; he has also published on the history of the Dutch in the Arctic in the nineteenth century. He rose to be Senior Curator of Navigation at the Nederlands Scheepvaartmuseum before his retirement in 2005. Since 1972, Mörzer Bruyns published several books and a hundred-and-fifteen articles in scholarly journals, on the history of navigation and navigational instruments, and on the exploration of the Dutch in the Arctic, in the nineteenth century. He wrote seventy-five book reviews on these subjects in scholarly journals.

== Early life and education ==
The son of Willem Fredrik Jacob Mörzer Bruyns Sr. (1913–1996), a Dutch merchant mariner, and a naval officer (reserve), the young Willem Mörzer Bruyns initially trained as navigation officer at the [Amsterdam Nautical College] (Hogere Zeevaartschool van het Zeemanshuis), Mörzer Bruyns sailed as a junior officer with the Amsterdam-based Netherland Line.

Career as a Museum Curator and historian

In 1969, Mörzer Bruyns joined the Netherlands Maritime Museum in Amsterdam and retired as Senior Curator of Navigation in 2005. In 1995 he was Huntington Fellow at The Mariners' Museum in Newport News, Virginia, and from 2005 to 2007 Sackler Research Fellow in the History of Astronomy and Navigational Sciences at the National Maritime Museum, Greenwich in London. In 2003, the University of Leiden awarded him a Ph.D. for his thesis on the introduction, diffusion and manufacturing of the octant in the eighteenth century Dutch Republic, completed under the guidance of Professor Jaap R. Bruijn and Professor C.A. Davids. On his retirement Mörzer Bruyns was presented with a festschrift, Koersvast: Vijf eeuwen navigatie op zee (Zaltbommel: Uitgeverij Aprilis, 2005). In October 2010, the National Maritime Museum awarded him its Caird Medal for 2009 in recognition of his many significant contributions to the history of navigational science and particularly for his catalogue of navigational instruments at Greenwich. In recognition of his work for the Peabody Essex Museum in Salem, Massachusetts, in 2009, the Marine Society at Salem of 1766, admitted him as an Honorary Governor.

== Published works ==
Books and Pamphlets

- De eerste tocht van de Willem Barents naar de Noordelijke IJszee 1878: De dagboeken van Antonius de Bruijne en Bastiaan Gerardus Baljé, two volumes edited by W.F.J. Mörzer Bruyns. Werken uitgegeven door de Linschoten-Vereeniging; vols. 84–85. (Zutphen: De Walburg Pers, 1985).
- "In de Gekroonde Lootsman": Het kaarten-, boekuitgevers en instrumentenmakershuis Van Keulen te Amsterdam 1680–1885, edited by E.O. van Keulen, W.F.J. Mörzer Bruyns, and E.K. Spits. (Utrecht: HES, 1989).
- Anglo-Dutch mercantile marine relations 1700–1850: Ten papers. edited by J.R. Bruijn and W.F.J. Mörzer Bruyns. (Amsterdam: Rijksmuseum 'Nederlands Scheepvaartmuseum', 1991).
- The Cross-staff: History and development of a navigational instrument (Amsterdam: Vereeniging Nederlandsch Historisch Scheepvaartmuseum, and Zutphen: Walburg Pers, 1994).
- Elements of Navigation in the Collection of The Mariners' Museum (Newport News, VA: The Mariners' Museum, 1996).
- Amsterdamse kompasmakers ca 1580-ca 1850: Bijdrage tot de kennis van de instrumentmakerij in Nederland, by Sybrich ter Kuile and W.F.J. Mörzer Bruyns. (Amsterdam: Stichting Nederlands Scheepvaartmuseum, and Amsterdam: NEHA, 1999).
- Konst der stuurlieden: Stuurmanskunst en maritieme cartografie in acht portretten, 1540–2000 (Zutphen: Walburg Pers, 2001).
- Sluit tot vaste kring de handen: Een geschiedenis van de Quakerscholen Eerde, Vilsteren en Beverweerd, by Joke Haverkorn van Rijsewijk, Willem Mörzer Bruyns, [et al.] (Amsterdam: Aksant, 2002).
- Schip Recht door Zee: De octant in de Republiek in de achttiende eeuw. (Amsterdam: Koninklijke Nederlandse Akademie van Wetenschappen, 2003). Proefschrift Universiteit Leiden
- De Nederlandsche Anchorites: Een maritiem broederschap by J.R. Bruijn and W.F.J. Mörzer Bruyns. (Amsterdam/Rotterdam: De Nederlandsche Anchorites, 2006). The second, updated edition, appeared in 2019.
- Sextants at Greenwich: A Catalogue of the Mariner's Quadrants, Mariner's Astrolabes, Cross-staffs, Backstaffs, Octants, Sextants, Quintants, Reflecting Circles and Artificial Horizons in the National Maritime Museum, Greenwich. by W.F.J. Mörzer Bruyns and Richard Dunn. (Oxford: Oxford University Press, 2009).
- Tussen hemel en horizon: Een korte geschiedenis van navigatie op Nederlandse schepen. (Haarlem: Hollandia, 2012), by W.F.J. Mörzer Bruyns and H. Hooijmaijers.
- Bruns, Bruijns, Mörzer Bruijns, geschiedenis van een familie. (privately published, Schoorl/Bussum, 2015).
- Met de Triton en Iris naar Nieuw-Guinea: De reisverhalen van Justin Modera en Arnoldus Johannes van Delden uit 1828. Edited by W.F.J. Mörzer Bruyns. Werken uitgegeven door de Linschoten-Vereeniging; vol. 117. (Zutphen: De Walburg Pers, 2018).
- Het goud in mijn beurs in plaats van op de rok: De 'Herinneringen' van koopvaardijkapitein Cornelis Abrahamsz jr. (1802-1879). Edited by W.F.J. Mörzer Bruyns. Werken uitgegeven door de Linschoten-Vereeniging; vol. 121. (Zutphen: De Walburg Pers, 2022).

Major Articles and Contributions to Books

- "Prime Meridians used by Dutch Navigators: A Survey of prime meridians used for Dutch navigation and hydrography prior to 1884," in Vistas in Astronomy vol. 28 (1985), pp. 33–39.
- "The Crone Collection of Nautical Instruments," in Hubert J.M.W. Peters, The Crone Library (Nieuwkoop: De Graaf Publishers, 1989).
- "Navigation on Dutch East India Company ships around the 1740s," in The Mariners' Mirror vol. 78, no. 2 (1992), pp. 143–154.
- "Techniques and methods of navigation"; "Sources of knowledge: charts and rutters"; "The development of navigational methods and techniques, 1740–1815"; "The application of navigational and hydrographical knowledge, 1740–1815", in John B. Hattendorf, ed., Maritime History: The Eighteenth Century and the Classic Age of Sail (Malabar, FL: Krieger Publishing, 1996).
- "Nederlandse en Belgische wetenschappelijke poolreizen van na 1875: Een overzicht.' in Scientiarum Historia 26, 1-2 (2000) 161-171, by L. Hacquebord and W.F.J. Mörzer Bruyns.
- "Photography in the Arctic, 1876–84: the work of W.J.A. Grant." in Polar Record vol. 39 (2003), pp. 123–130.
- "Frederik Muller & Co and Anton Mensing: The first international art auction house in Amsterdam, and its director," in Quærendo: A Quarterly Journal from the Low Countries Devoted to Manuscripts and Printed Books vol. 34, no. 3-4 (2004), pp. 211–239.
- "Octants from the Frisian Island of Föhr for Dutch and German Whale Men, 1760–90," in The Mariner's Mirror, vol. 92, no. 4 (2006), pp. 412–426.
- "Dead Reckoning"; "Douwes, Cornelis"; Prime Meridians", and "Western Navigation" in John B. Hattendorf, ed., Oxford Encyclopedia of Maritime History (Oxford: Oxford University Press, 2007).
- "Conrad's Navigation: Joseph Conrad as a Professional Sailor" in International Journal of Maritime History vol. XIX, no. 2 (2007), pp. 201–222.
- "'Een extra fraai octant in zyn kas' uit de verzameling van een achttiende-eeuwse Amsterdamse regent" in Studium: Revue d'histoire des sciences et des universités 1, 3 (2008) 195–209.
- "Research in the History of Navigation: Its Role in Maritime History" in International Journal of Maritime History vol. XXI, no. 2 (2009), pp. 261–286.
- "Trade Labels: Evidence of English Octants and Sextants in America up to about 1860" in Rittenhouse: Journal of the American Scientific Instrument Enterprise vol. 23, no. 1 (2009), pp. 1–37.
- "The Taking Possession of Part of New Guinea by the Dutch in 1828, and their Contribution to the Knowledge of the Arafura Sea" in The Great Circle: Journal of the Australian Association for Maritime History vol. 41, no. 1 (2019) pp. 38–59.
- "Scientific and other instruments used in Arctic Regions on the Dutch Schooner Willem Barents, in 1878" in Bulletin of the Scientific Instrument Society no. 143 (2019) pp. 30–36.
