= Jaap R. Bruijn =

Dutch maritime historian (1938–2022)

Jacobus Ruurd "Jaap" Bruijn (13 March 1938 in The Hague – 2 November 2022 in Oegstgeest), was a Dutch maritime historian. He was professor of maritime history at the University of Leiden from 1979 until his retirement in 2003. During his 41-year teaching career as The Netherlands' only university professor of maritime history, he guided the doctoral theses of at least 49 graduate students.

== Education and academic career ==
He completed his doctorate in 1970 at the University of Leiden with a thesis on De Admiraliteit van Amsterdam in rustige jaren, 1713-1751.

In 1974–75, while associate professor of history at Leiden, he was a Fellow at the Netherlands Institute for Advanced Study in the Humanities and Social Sciences.

== Awards and honors ==
On his retirement, Bruijn was presented with an album amicorum, In het kielzog: maritiem-historische studies aangeboden aan Jaap R. Bruijn bij zijn vertrek als hoogleraar zeegeschiedenis aan de Universiteit Leiden, edited by Leo Akveld, [et al.], (Amsterdam: De Bataafse Leeuw, 2003).

In 2001, the Nederlandse Vereniging voor Zeegeschiedenis named a prize in his honor, the J.R. Bruijn Prize, which was first awarded in 2003, is given for an outstanding undergraduate thesis in the field of maritime history.

== Bibliography ==
- De oorlogvoering ter zee in 1673 in journalen en andere stukken, edited by J.R. Bruijn. Werken uitg. door het Historisch Genootschap (gevestigd te Utrecht); 3e serie, no. 84. (Groningen: Wolters, 1966).
- De Admiraliteit van Amsterdam in rustige jaren, 1713-1751: regenten en financiën, schepen en zeevarenden. Proefschrift Leiden and also published as Gemeentelijke Archiefdienst van Amsterdam, uitgeg. door de stichting genaamd "Stichting H.J. Duyvisfonds", no. 10. (Amsterdam: Scheltema & Holkema, 1970).
- 58 miljoen Nederlanders en de zeevaart by J.R. Bruijn, E.S. van Eyck van Helsinga. (Amsterdam: Amsterdam Boek, 1977).
- Het gelag der zeelieden. (Den Haag: Universitaire Pers Leiden, 1979).
- Dutch-Asiatic shipping in the 17th and 18th centuries, Vol. III: Homeward-bound voyages from Asia and the Cape to the Netherlands (1597-1795), edited by J.R. Bruijn, F.S. Gaastra and I. Schöffer; with assistance of E.S. van Eyck van Heslinga. Rijks geschiedkundige publicatiën. Grote serie, vol. 167. (The Hague: Nijhoff, 1979).
- Dutch-Asiatic shipping in the 17th and 18th centuries Vol. II: Outward-bound voyages from the Netherlands to Asia and the Cape (1595-1794), ed. by J.R. Bruijn, F.S. Gaastra, and I. Schöffer; with assistance of E.S. van Eyck van Heslinga. Rijks geschiedkundige publicatiën. Grote serie, vol. 166. (The Hague: Nijhoff, 1979).
- Op de schepen der Oost-Indische Compagnie: vijf artikelen van J. de Hullu, ingeleid, bewerkt en voorzien van een studie over de werkgelegenheid bij de VOC; J.R. Bruijn en J. Lucassen, eds. (Groningen: Wolters-Noordhoff/Bouma's Boekhuis, 1980).
- Muiterij: oproer en berechting op schepen van de VOC, edited by J.R. Bruijn and E.S. van Eyck van Heslinga. (Haarlem: De Boer Maritiem, 1980).
- Dutch-Asiatic shipping in the 17th and 18th centuries Vol. I: Introductory volume, by J.R. Bruijn, F.S. Gaastra and I. Schöffer; with assistance from A.C.J. Vermeulen. Rijks geschiedkundige publicatiën. Grote serie, vol. 165. (The Hague: Nijhoff, 1987).
- Maarten Schaap, een Katwijker ter koopvaardij (1782-1870): een biografie en een dagboek, by J.R. Bruijn and E.S. van Eyck van Heslinga with E.M. Jacobs. (Amsterdam: Noord-Hollandsche Uitgevers Mij, 1988).
- Shipping companies and authorities in the 19th and 20th centuries: their common interest in the development of port facilities : proceedings of the congress to commemorate the 25th anniversary of the Netherlands Association for Maritime History, Rotterdam, Maritiem Museum 'Prins Hendrik', September 25–27, 1986, L.M. Akveld and J.R. Bruijn, eds. (Den Haag: Nederlandse Vereniging voor Zeegeschiedenis, 1989)
- Julius Constantijn Rijk: zeeman en minister 1787-1854 by J. R. Bruijn, H. J. den Heijer, H. Stapelkamp. (Amsterdam : De Bataafsche Leeuw, 1991).
- Anglo-Dutch mercantile marine relations 1700-1850: ten papers, edited by J.R. Bruijn and W.F.J. Mörzer Bruyns. (Amsterdam: Rijksmuseum Nederlands Scheepvaartmuseum, 1991).
- The Dutch navy of the seventeenth and eighteenth centuries. (Columbia, SC: University of South Carolina Press, 1993)
- Ships, sailors and spices : East India companies and their shipping in the 16th, 17th and 18th centuries. ed. by Jaap R. Bruijn and Femme Gaastra. (Amsterdam: NEHA, 1993).
- Bij de Marva: vrouwelijke militairen in dienst van de Koninklijke Marine 1944-1982 by Anita M.C. van Dissel en Jaap R. Bruijn. (Amsterdam: De Bataafsche Leeuw, 1994).
- Van zeeman tot residentieburger: Cornelius de Jong van Rodenburgh (1762-1838) by Jaap R. Bruijn en Carla van Baalen. (Hilversum: Verloren, 1996).
- I tre viaggi per mare di Willem Barentsz / Gerrit de Veer, ed. a cura di Juliette Roding e Pinuccia Drago; introd. e note di Juliette Roding; pref. di Jaap R. Bruijn. (Milano: San Paolo, 1996).
- De 7 Provinciën: een nieuw schip voor Michiel de Ruyter edited by J.R. Bruijn, et al. (Franeker: Van Wijnen, 1997).
- "Those emblems of hell"? : European sailors and the maritime labour market, 1570-1870, edited by Paul van Royen, Jaap Bruijn, and Jan Lucassen.(St. John's, Newfoundland: International Maritime Economic History Association, 1997).
- Een cultuur valt droog : over het ontstaan van het Zuiderzeemuseum, 1916-1950 by Frouke Wieringa; redactiecommissie: Jaap R. de Bruijn, et al. (Enkhuizen] : Vereniging Vrienden van het Zuiderzeemuseum, 1998).
- Varend verleden: de Nederlandse oorlogsvloot in de zeventiende en achttiende eeuw (Amsterdam: Balans, 1998).
- Marinekapiteins uit de achttiende eeuw: een Zeeuws elftal, edited by J.R. Bruijn, A.C. Meijer, A.P. van Vliet. (Den Haag : Instituut voor Maritieme Historie, 2000).
- Strategy and response : in the twentieth century maritime world : papers presented to the fourth British-Dutch maritime history conference, edited by Jaap R. Bruijn, et al. (Amsterdam: Batavian Lion International, 2001).
- Roemrucht verleden : de Staten-Generaal en de VOC (Den Haag: Tweede Kamer der Staten-Generaal, 2002).
- Met man en macht: de militaire geschiedenis van Nederland 1550-2000, edited by Jaap R. Bruijn and Cees B. Wels. (Amsterdam: Balans, 2003).
- Observaties onderweg Afscheidsrede Universiteit Leiden. (Leiden: Universiteit Leiden, 2003)
- De Nederlandsche Anchorites: een maritiem broederschap by J.R. Bruijn en W.F.J. Mörzer Bruyns. (Amsterdam [etc.]: De Nederlandsche Anchorites, 2006).
- Oxford Encyclopedia of Maritime History, John B. Hattendorf, editor in chief; Senior editors: Jaap R. Bruijn, et al. (Oxford: Oxford University Press, 2007).
- De admiraal: de wereld van Michiel Adriaenszoon de Ruyter by A.Th. van Deursen, J.R. Bruijn, J.E. Korteweg. (Franeker : Van Wijnen, 2007.
- Schippers van de VOC in de achttiende eeuw aan de wal en op zee (Amsterdam : De Bataafsche Leeuw, 2008).
- Kaapvaart en piraterij (Leiden: Hoger Onderwijs Voor Ouderen, Universiteit Leiden, 2009).
- Commanders of Dutch East India Ships in the Eighteenth Century (Woodbridge: Boydell & Brewer, 2011).
- De Ruyter: Dutch Admiral. Protagonists of History in International Perspective. Edited by Jaap R. Bruijn, Ronald Prud'homme van Reine, and Rolof van Hövell tot Westerflier. (Rotterdam: Karawansary Publishers, 2011).
- Zeeuwse zeehelden: uit de zestiende en zeventiende eeuw Onder red. van Tobias van Gent en Ruud Paesie; [auteurs: Jaap R. Bruijn ... et al.; tekstred.: Veronica Frenks]. (Vlissingen: Den Boer/De Ruiter, 2012).
- De laatste traan : walvisvangst met de Willem Barendsz, 1946-1964 by Jaap R. Bruijn en Joost C.A. Schokkenbroek. (Zutphen: Walberg Pers, 2013).
- Alba: general and servant to the crown. Edited by Maurits Ebben, Margriet Lacy-Bruijn, Rolof van Hövell tot Westerflier; advisory committee: Jaap R. Bruijn, Alastair Duke, Simon Groenveld. (Rotterdam: Karawansary Publishers, 2013).
- Zeegang: zeevarend Nederland in de achttiende eeuw (Zutphen: WalbergPers, 2016).
