= A.B. Chapman =

A. B. Chapman may refer to:

- Arthur Barclay Chapman (1908–2004) a Wisconsin animal genetics researcher
- Alfred Beck Chapman (1829–1915), California real-estate attorney and investor
