= Porter Jarvis =

American businessman (1902–1981)

Porter Maxwell Jarvis (6 November 1902 in Clarksburg, West Virginia – 23 December 1991 in Tubac, Arizona) was a prominent Chicago businessman and leader in the American meat-packing industry. He was president and then chairman of the board of Swift & Co., 1955 to 1967. During his years as president and chairman, Swift & Co., with an annual revenue of $2.76 billion, was the thirteenth largest corporation in America.

== Family, early life, and education ==
The son of Hugh Jarvis (1870-1947), a banker and farm owner, and Harriet Maxwell, he grew up in Clarksburg, West Virginia, and attended Iowa State University in Ames, Iowa, where he earned a Bachelor of Science degree in 1924. majoring in animal husbandry. Later, he earned a Master of Business Administration at the University of Chicago. In 1928, he married Elizabeth Hauck (died 1963), with whom he had two children, Hugh (1937) and Elizabeth (Betty),1940. In 1966, he married Dorothy Collom Hattendorf (1903-1997) and was the step-father of Professor John B. Hattendorf. For much of his active business career, he lived in Beverly, Chicago. After his retirement, he was a resident of Tubac, Arizona and Willowick Farm, located between Newark, Illinois and Sandwich, Illinois as well as a summer resident at Portage Point, Michigan.

== Business career ==
Porter Jarvis joined the Provision Department of Swift & Co. in 1926, as a trainee in its pork department in St. Joseph, Missouri, later rising to be assistant to the vice president, John Holmes, in charge of the pork division, 1933 to 1938. From 1933 to 1938, he was assistant to Holmes, when Holmes became president of the company. Jarvis was vice president of Swift and Company from 1941 to 1950, and serving as a director from 1949 to 1967. In 1950, he became the first person to serve as executive vice president from 1950 to 1955, then rising to become chief executive of the company as president, from 1955 to 1964, and then chairman from 1964 until his retirement in 1967.

He was a director of the American Meat Institute, the Iowa State University Foundation, the Illinois Central Railroad, International Harvester Company, and the Continental Illinois National Bank & Trust. Additional, he served as a trustee of the University of Chicago and the Museum of Science and Industry.

He was a member of the Economic, Commercial, Chicago, and Union League clubs in Chicago. Retiring from Swift in accordance with its age-65 retirement policy, Jarvis had overseen sweeping changes in the meat packing industry and within Swift & Company. Under his leadership, the company diversified into such fields as nitrogen products and potash; investment in the company's insurance complex as well as increasing Swift's adhesive plants to twenty-five located in the United States, Canada, and England. In addition, Swift substantially developed specialized services for hotels, restaurants, and other institutions. Overseas, Swift went into a variety of ventures on a joint basis with local partners in other countries. Jarvis was a strong advocate for the company's research and development department. At the time of his retirement on 1 December 1967, the company was in the process of moving 300 scientists into a new multi-million dollar research center located at Oak Brook, Illinois. Jarvis was succeeded as chief executive of the company by Robert W. Reneker.

== Honors ==
Porter Jarvis held honorary doctorates of law from the University of West Virginia, West Virginia Wesleyan College, and the University of Iowa. The West Virginia Future Farmers of America awarded him its Honorary Degree in 1963. In 1964, Iowa State University presented him with its Distinguished Alumni Award.
