= Portage Point, Michigan =

- Unincorporated community
- Location within the state of Michigan
- Coordinates: 44°21′43″N 86°15′42″W
- Country: United States
- State: Michigan
- County: Manistee
- Township: Onekama
- Elevation: 623 ft (190 m)
- Time zone: UTC-5 (Eastern (EST))
  - Summer (DST): UTC-4 (EDT)
- Area code: 231
- GNIS feature ID: 635285

Portage Point is an unincorporated summer resort area of Onekama Township, Manistee County in the U.S. state of Michigan. It includes the site of the first town on Portage Lake at 44°21′43″N 86°15′42″W It is located on the narrow strip of land between Portage Lake and Lake Michigan developed by the Portage Point Association. A post office operated in summers from August 1917 until September 1921.

== Early history and settlement ==
The area was probably visited by Henri de Tonty in 1679 and other early explorers of the eastern coast of Lake Michigan. The first known non-Native Americans to live for any length of time near Portage Point was the crew of the schooner Prince Eugene that wrecked on 15 November 1835 three or four miles (6 km) south of the present-day channel between Portage Lake and Lake Michigan. Not wanting to walk to the nearest town in winter, Grand Rapids or Muskegon, they built a log cabin in the dunes and waited for spring.

Michigan became a state in 1837, and in that same year the Federal government first surveyed the area around Portage Lake. At that time the lake was called "O-neK-ama-engk", which was believed to be the native word for "portage".

The natural outlet of Portage Lake was located about a mile north of the present-man made outlet. This stream ran northwesterly from the Portage Lake side (close to and crossing the section lines between sections 21 and 28) the present-day intersection of Ridge Avenue and Portage Point Drive, north along Norwood Avenue to cross Lakeisle Avenue and then to pass into Lake Michigan just north of the intersection of Lakeisle and Lakeside Avenue are located, almost exactly on the section line separating sections 28 and 33. It was recognized very early as an excellent site for a waterpowered saw mill.

In 1845, Joseph Stronach purchased the land surrounding the outlet from Portage Lake and his uncle, James Stronach, built a dam and a sawmill at the outlet, about eight rods back from the Lake Michigan shore. In the summer of 1850, Joseph Stronach drowned while sailing from the Portage Creek outlet to Manistee and the property passed to his nephew, James Stronach, who maintained it until about 1852, when Joseph Harper purchased it. At that point, the entrance to the Portage stream could reportedly accommodate vessels with a draft of nearly two feet, but could not pass the dam into Portage Lake. The mill burned in 1853. Harper returned the 40-acre (160,000 m^{2}) property to Stronach, who in turn sold it to the J. L. James Company of Chicago. Over the next eighteen years, the mill was rebuilt and the property expanded to more than 4,000 acres (16 km^{2}) of timberland. The property was operated successively by a number of firms, including Hannah and Rockwell in 1857, Coffin and Lockwood in 1860, Porter and Bates in 1866, Porter & Co. in 1868.

By 1870, the operation of the sawmill and its dam had created difficulties for landowners on the northern and eastern shores of Portage Lake. The Lake as originally landlocked, except for the small stream and had a natural height about four to five feet above the level of Lake Michigan. The dam created at the Portage Mill to operate the saw mill was increasingly raised and had the effect of raising the water level of Portage Lake by an additional five to six feet, flooding the low-lying land at the far send of the lake. From 1860, farmers in the area began to complain about the mill operators practice of periodically raising the Lake level to accommodate their needs for power to operate the saw mill. Additionally, the mill company began to charge increasingly high fees to use their pier at the Portage outlet. Business at Portage Mill increased rapidly and the site became a busy little village as the mill and its fifty workers reportedly cut 30,000 shingles, 10,000-12,000 pieces of lath a day, totally 4.5 million feet of timber in the 1870 cutting season.

By 1870, the pier at the Portage Mill was a wooden bridge pier that was 30 to 40 feet (12 m) wide, stood about 12 feet (3.7 m) out of the water, and extended several hundred feet into Lake Michigan. A narrow gauge railroad carries the timber from the mill out to the waiting vessels alongside the pier. The pier was widely known and used not only for loading sailing ships with lumber cut at the mill, but also by sidewheel and propeller steam-powered vessels that stopped to refuel with wood or to pick up or deliver passengers and freight for the surrounding area. The United States Government established Post Office at the Mill on 8 May 1871, but the Post Office Department required the name "O-nek-a-ma" for addresses in the area around Portage Lake, although the little village and mill retained the name "Portage".

Meanwhile, the farmers operating their homestead lands around the shore of the lake were becoming increasingly exasperated by the Portage Mill operators. In 1868, a group of homesteaders had sought an injunction against Porter & Company to prevent the firm from raising their lake level above its natural levels, complaining that 400 acres (1.6 km^{2}) had been flooded. Others complained that they could sail boats among the trees. As a result, the circuit court ordered on 25 May 1870 the removal of the dam by 5 December 1870. The court order required that it be served personally on the proprietors of Porter & Company, but this proved to be difficult as they were located in Chicago. By mid-April 1871, the homesteaders made a formal complaint in Circuit Court reporting to the court that Porter & Company had failed to comply.

Under the pretense of starting a rival timber company, Nathan Pierce and Theodore Heiss had purchased a strip of land in 1867 from Andrew Shanks about a mile south of the Portage Mill on the narrow sand isthmus between Portage Lake and Lake Michigan. Four years later, Amos Pierce (Nathan's son and right-hand man) with a group of other like-minded men, decided to dig a ditch that would permanently lower Portage Lake to the level of Lake Michigan and put the Portage Mill out of business. A long list of local people joined in the effort to dig a ditch. When Porter & Company's representatives saw the work underway, they attempted to charge the organizers with cutting off their water supplies, but the feelings against the company was so bitter that the court dismissed the complaint.

On the night of 13 May 1871, the ditch was ready with only a log barricade holding back the waters of Portage Lake and those who had been involved reportedly held a dance celebration for fifty people at the site. The following morning, Sunday 14 May 1871, a single ox pulled the barricade down and the waters rushed through the cut, digging an even deeper and wider passage. The new passage was nearly five hundred feet wide and twelve feet deep, lowering Portage Lake by twelve to fourteen feet and returning it to its pre-historic condition as a natural bay of Lake Michigan.

Offshore in Lake Michigan that Sunday, the sidewheel steamer John A. Dix on a passage between Manistee and Traverse City suddenly found itself surrounded by trees swept out from the new Portage Lake cut and changed her course to the Wisconsin side of the Lake to avoid the danger. On Monday, 15 May 1871, the tugboat Williams was first ship entered Portage Lake through the cut to loud cheers and celebration. In recognition of this fact, the local people named the Portage Lake side of the cut Williamsport, Michigan in honor of the tug boat.

With this development, the settlement around the old Portage outlet was moved to the eastern end of Portage Lake, where it adopted the new Post office name of O-nek-a-ma'.

== Summer resort ==
After the lumber industry was exhausted, Michigan's leaders began to look for an alternative means of economic development of the state. In 1897, the Michigan State legislature enabled the formation of corporations in order to build resorts. In 1902, the Sunnyside Assembly purchased the land on the northwest side of Portage Lake that had formerly belonged to the Marvins. They changed the name of their organization to the Portage Point Assembly and incorporated it on 31 January 1902 under the special 1897 act of the Michigan legislature for building a resort and immediately began to build the Portage Point Inn on 12 July 1902. The following year, the building first opened for guests on 20 June 1903.

The first decade for the Portage Point Inn was a difficult time, but a few cottages were built and paid annual dues to the resort. In 1909, the Northern Michigan Transportation Company began to purchase tracts of land on the northern and western shore of Portage Lake and by 1914 had become the principal investor in the Portage Portage Point Assembly and, by the end of that year, took over management of the Inn. They platted the subdivision of 40 acres (160,000 m^{2}) of land to the north of the Assembly's property that included the sire of the old village of Portage and began to sell the lots. This area was called the Portage Park Addition and consisted of 3,500 lots including a golf course, but only a small fraction of these lots were ever sold and developed.

By 1914, the Portage Point Inn was served by the steamships of the Northern Michigan Transportation Company, SS Puritan and SS Missouri and those of the Pere Marquette Line, providing direct service from Chicago and Milwaukee.

From this year, the summer colony began to develop quietly and steadily. Mary B. (Mrs Frank J.) Hattendorf was the first of a large group of residents from the Chicago suburb of Western Springs, Illinois to come to Portage Point. A widowed school teacher, she and her young son first arrived in 1914 and purchased two lots, first living in a tent and then constructing a house on the same site in 1916. She persuaded her closest friends from Western Springs, Illinois, Harmon and Mary Watt, to join her for the summer. They purchased adjoining lots and were soon joined by other mutual friends from Western Springs, including Leonard and Anita Vaughan, Hugh and Nell Rollin, and the Arthur Boyers. Many others from the same town joined them over the years as following generations continued to make Portage Point their summer residence and brought their friends and extended families.

In 1985, the Portage Point Inn was listed on the National Register of Historic Places.

== Notable people ==
- Representative Richard W. Bolling, (D-Missouri), summer resident
- Professor Arthur B. Chapman, University of Wisconsin–Madison; summer resident
- Senator Otis F. Glenn, (R-Illinois), summer resident
- Professor John Hattendorf, maritime historian, summer resident
- Porter Jarvis, President of Swift & Co., summer resident
- Professor Kenneth S. Wagoner, DePauw University, summer resident
- David Warsh, journalist and author, summer resident

== Sources and references ==
- Elsket Barstow Cheney, The Story of Portage. Onekama, 1960.
- Gail B. Verplanck, ed., Wellspring: Interesting interviews... The way things were, the way things are... in Manistee County. Manistee: J.B. Publications, 1982, vol II.
- Bill Smythe, compiler and editor, A Place Called Portage: A collection of Memories by those who experienced the Development of a place called Portage from 1912-1989. (Manistee, Michigan: J.B. Publications, 1989).
