= Jehuda L. Wallach =

Israeli military historian (1921–2008)

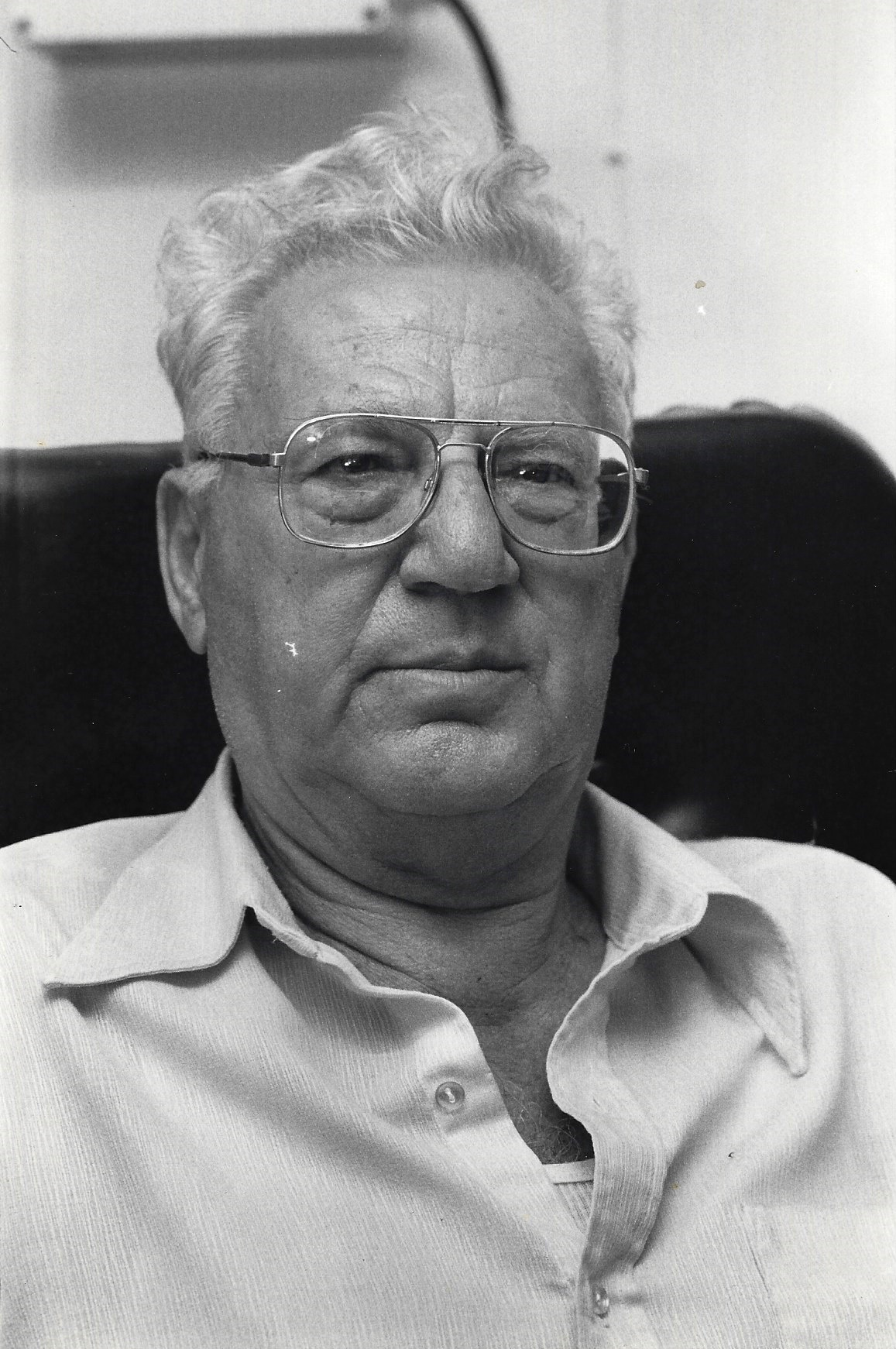
Prof. Yehuda Wallach 2004

Jehuda Lothar Wallach (Hebrew: יהודה ואלך) (12 March 1921 in Haigerloch, Germany – 1 August 2008 in Tel-Aviv, Israel) was an Israeli military officer and military historian.

== Early life and education ==
The son of Louis Wallach and his wife Minna Rothheimer, Jehuda Wallach attended school in Mannheim, Germany, before he emigrated at age fifteen with his parents in 1936 to the British Mandate for Palestine. After graduating from high school, he lived for some years in Beit Zera on the south shore of the Sea of Galilee, a kibbutz that had been founded nearly a decade earlier by immigrants from Austria and Germany. While in Beir Zera in 1940, he married Chava Turetzky, with whom he later had three children: Roni, Eliezer, and Uri.

== Military career ==
As a boy, Wallach joined the Haganah, the Jewish paramilitary organization. During the 1948 Arab–Israeli War, Wallach was a battalion commander in the Givati Brigade and fought in the northern Negev. In 1949, he was appointed to command the Tenth Brigade and became one of the first army division commanders of the Israeli Defense Force. In 1956 (before Operation Kadesh) he was one of the first two commanders in the IDF (along with Haim Laskov), when he established and commanded Division 38, which moved on the main axis in Sinai. Possibly due to a dispute between him and Moshe Dayan, who was chief of staff, over the form of operation of the armor following which Dayan commanded the division, while bypassing the authority of Wallach. In these battles, four IDF brigades failed to overcome two brigades Egyptians who were arranged in organized complexes. IDF casualties in these battles were high and the Egyptian force withdrew from the complexes only after three days of battle, following the Anglo-French operation in Egypt.

He later became a mechanized brigade commander and was head of the Israeli Army's infantry training department. He left military service in 1960 to start his academic career, but during the Six Days War in 1967, he returned briefly to active service on the general staff.

== Academic career ==
He attended the Hebrew University, where he earned his Bachelor of Arts degree in 1962. Going on to the University of Oxford in England, he earned his doctor of philosophy in 1965 with a thesis on “Clausewitz and Schlieffen: a study of the impact of their theories on the German conduct of the 1914–1918 and 1939–1945 wars, “ under the supervision of Professor N.H. Gibbs, Chichele Professor of the History of War. On returning to Israel from Oxford in 1965, Wallach was appointed senior lecturer in military history at Tel Aviv University, where he was appointed associate professor in 1972 and professor in 1976. He was head of military history, a research fellow at the Institute of German History, and head of the School of History. In 1978, he became chairman of the Israeli Society for Military History and was a member of the Vienna International Investigation Commission that investigated the military career of Kurt Waldheim. He was a visiting professor at the Center for Strategic and International Studies, Georgetown University.

== Prizes and honors ==
He was a recipient of the ALA Medal and, in 2003, Wallach was awarded the Yitzhak Sadeh Prize for Military Literature.

== Published works ==
- Das Dogma der Vernichtungsschlacht: Die Lehren von Clausewitz und Schlieffen und ihre Wirkungen in zwei Weltkriegen. [Von] Jehuda L. Wallach. (Aus dem Englischen von Hans Jürgen Baron von Koskull.) Hrsg. vom Arbeitskreis für Wehrforschung. (Frankfurt a. M.: Bernard u. Graefe, 1967).
- Kriegstheorien: ihre Entwicklung im 19. u. 20. Jahrhundert. (Frankfurt am Main : Bernard & Graefe, 1972).
- Atḷas Karṭa le-toldot Erets-Yiśraʼel me-reshit ha-hityashvut ṿe-ʿad ḳom ha-medinah. Carta's atlas of Palestine from Zionism to statehood. (Yerushalayim : Karṭa, 1972).
- Germany and the Middle East, 1835-1939: international symposium, April 1975. (Tel-Aviv : Tel-Aviv University, Faculty of Humanities, Aranne School of History, Institute of German History, 1975).
- Anatomie einer Militärhilfe: die preußisch-deutschen Militärmissionen in der Türkei 1835-1919. (Düsseldorf : Droste, 1976).
- The dogma of the battle of annihilation: the theories of Clausewitz and Schlieffen and their impact on the German conduct of two world wars. (Westport, Conn.; London : Greenwood, 1986).
- Die Kriegslehre von Friedrich Engels. (Frankfurt am Main: Europäische Verlagsanstalt, 1968).
- Uneasy coalition: the entente experience in World War I. (Westport, Conn.: London : Greenwood, 1993).
- Hayinu ke-ḥolmim: ḳovets meḥḳarim ʿal Milḥemet ha-Ḳomemiyut. ([Ramat Gan] : Masadah, 1985).
- Lo `al magash shel kesef: toldot medinat Yiþsra'el me-reshit ha-hityashvut `ad `idan ha-shalom Not on a silver platter : a history of Israel, 1900-2000’’. (Tel Aviv: Miþsrad ha-bitahon, ha-hotsa'ah le-or; Yerushalayim : Karta, 2000).
