= David Warsh =

American journalist and author (born 1944)

David Lewis Warsh (born May 25, 1944) is an American journalist and author who has generally covered topics in economics and finance. Since 2002, he has written and published Economic Principals, a weekly series of essays about economics and economists.

== Early life and education ==
Warsh was born in New York City, the son of Leo George and Annis Meade Warsh. He graduated from Lyons Township High School in LaGrange, Illinois in 1962, then from Harvard College in 1972 (66-72).

== Professional career ==
Warsh began his career as a copy-boy at City News Bureau of Chicago and as a staff reporter for Keene Evening Sentinel in Keene, New Hampshire. He served 1965-1969 in the US Navy and reported on the Vietnam War for Pacific Stars and Stripes and Newsweek. He worked briefly for The Wall Street Journal and the Wilmington News-Journal, then covered economics for Forbes, before joining the staff of The Boston Globe from 1978. The twice-weekly column he began writing there in 1983 ran intermittently in The Washington Post and Chicago Tribune as well. A two-time winner of UCLA's Gerald Loeb Award, in 1977 and in 1989, he was a Fellow of the American Academy in Berlin in 2004, receiving its J.P. Morgan International Prize in Finance Policy and Economics.

In March 2002, Warsh left the Globe to write online at Economic Principals, his own reader-supported website.. The focus of the website and his writing is "technical economics through the device of weekly profiles of various movers and shakers" as well as various short items. In 2012, the website had some 20,000 readers.

He is home-based in Somerville, Massachusetts and is a summer resident of Portage Point near Onekama, Michigan.

In 2012, Lyons Township High School inducted him into its Hall of Fame.

== Publications ==
- Because They Could:The Harvard Russia Scandal (and NATO Enlargement) after Twenty-Five Years CreateSpace (2018)
- Knowledge and the Wealth of Nations: A Story of Economic Discovery. New York : W. W. Norton (2006).
- Economic Principals: Masters and Mavericks of Modern Economics. New York : Free Press (1993).
- The Idea of Economic Complexity. New York : Viking (1984).
- What Drives the Wealth of Nations? with David S. Landes, 7 pages, Harvard Business School Pub. Corporation (1998).
- Inflation is Now Too Serious a Matter to Leave to the Economists: Memo to President Carter 21 pages (1976)
