= John B. Hattendorf =

American naval historian (born 1941)

John Brewster Hattendorf
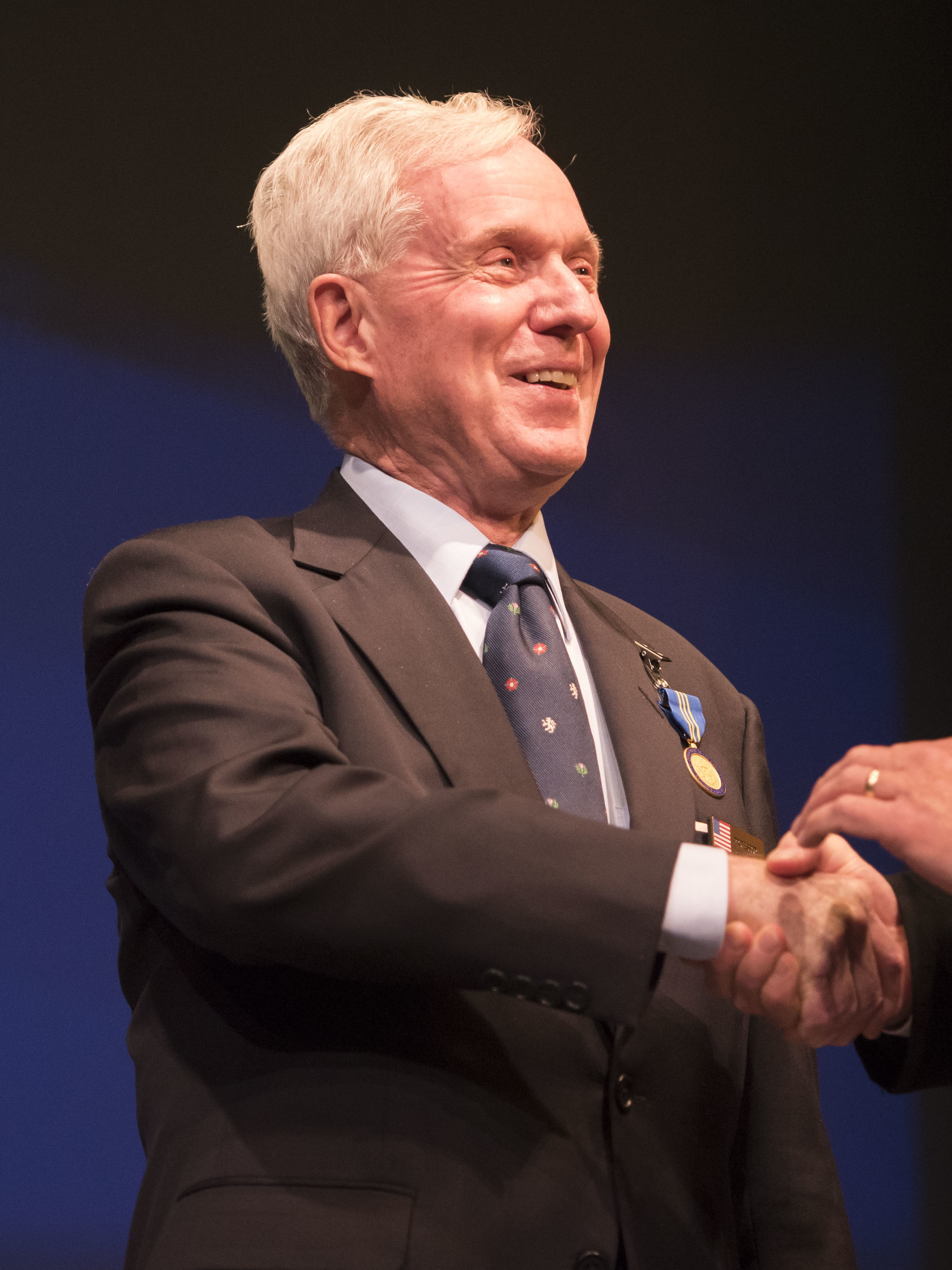
- Born: December 22, 1941 (age 84); Western Springs, Illinois, U.S.

Academic background
- Education: Kenyon College; Brown University; University of Oxford
- Influences: Richard G. Salomon; Charles Ritcheson; A. Hunter Dupree; Piers Mackesy; Ragnhild Hatton; N. H. Gibbs

Academic work
- Institutions: United States Naval War College; National University of Singapore
- Main interests: Maritime history
- Notable works: Trafalgar (OUP, 2026); Oxford Encyclopedia of Maritime History (2007); English Grand Strategy in the War of the Spanish Succcesion, 1702-1711 (1987); Sailors and Scholars: The History of the Naval War College (1984), 2nd edition. (2025); U.S. Naval Strategy: Selected Documents, 1970-1990. 3 vols.(2006-2008); The Evolution of the U.S. Navy’s Maritime Strategy, 1977-1988 (2004)

John Brewster Hattendorf, FRHistS, FSNR, (born December 22, 1941) is an American naval historian. He is the author, co-author, editor, or co-editor of more than fifty books, mainly on British and American maritime history and naval warfare.

In 2005, the U.S. Naval Institute Proceedings described him as "one of the most widely known and well-respected naval historians in the world." In reference to his work on the history of naval strategy, an academic in Britain termed him the "doyen of US naval educators." A Dutch scholar went further to say that Hattendorf "may rightly be called one of the most influential maritime historians in the world."

From 1984 to 2016, he was the Ernest J. King Professor of Maritime History at the United States Naval War College in Newport, Rhode Island. He has called maritime history "a subject that touches on both the greatest moments of the human spirit as well as on the worst, including war." In March 2016, Hattendorf received the higher doctorate of Doctor of Letters (D.Litt.) from the University of Oxford. Among the few Americans to have earned this academic degree at Oxford, Hattendorf remained actively engaged on the Naval War College campus after his formal retirement in 2016.

Remaining in scholarly service as the Ernest J. King Professor Emeritus of Maritime History at the Naval War College, Hattendorf continued guiding discussions about the role of history in understanding contemporary strategic problems in the global maritime arena. Recognizing his contributions in the fields of maritime history and naval strategy, the President of the Naval War College, Rear Admiral Jeffrey Harley, established the "John B. Hattendorf Center for Maritime Historical Research" in the summer of 2017. The Hattendorf Historical Center performs the mission of supporting history requirements in Professional Military Education through original documentary research, scholarly publications, public education programming, and direct support to the seagoing forces of the U.S. Navy. The Hattendorf Historical Center also provides historical foundations for contemporary discussion in the interest of facilitating international partnerships in the global maritime commons.

== Early life, education, and family ==
The second son of Chicago Tribune advertising executive William Homer Hattendorf (1902-1958) and Dorothy Collom Hattendorf (1903-1997), John was born and raised in the village of Western Springs, Illinois. He was a stepson of Porter Jarvis. His interest in ships and the sea stemmed from summers spent at his family cottage at Portage Point, Michigan, where he was a sailing instructor on Portage Lake from 1958 to 1964. After graduating in the Class of 1960 from Lyons Township High School in LaGrange, Illinois, he earned his bachelor's degree in history in 1964 from Kenyon College, where he was inspired by Charles Ritcheson and Richard G. Salomon. In 1970, he graduated from the Frank C. Munson Institute of American Maritime History at Mystic Seaport, where he studied under Robert G. Albion and Benjamin W. Labaree. He earned his master's degree in history from Brown University in 1971, completing his thesis under the tutelage of A. Hunter Dupree on the history of strategic thinking and wargaming at the Naval War College. In 1979, he completed his doctorate at Pembroke College, Oxford with a thesis on English Grand Strategy in the War of the Spanish Succession, 1702–12, supervised by N. H. Gibbs and complemented by studies under Ragnhild Hatton, Sir Michael Howard and Piers Mackesy. He married Berit Maria Sundell (b. 6 November 1941 in Stockholm, Sweden — died 10 May 2021 in Newport, Rhode Island, USA), daughter of Swedish newspaperman and author Gunnar Sundell, with whom he had three daughters (Kristina, Ingrid, and Anna) and seven grandchildren.

== Naval career ==
After graduating from Kenyon College, he served as a naval officer for eight years during the Vietnam War. He served on board USS O'Brien (DD-725), earning a commendation from the Commander, United States Seventh Fleet, for outstanding performance of duty during combat operations in April 1967. Later, he served at sea in USS Purdy (DD-734) and USS Fiske (DD-842). While in the U.S. Navy, Hattendorf also served ashore at the Naval History Division, Office of the Chief of Naval Operations (Op-09B9), in Washington, D.C. in 1967–69, where he was first trained in naval history under Rear Admiral Ernest M. Eller and Dr. William J. Morgan, and at the Naval War College in 1972–73, where he served as speech writer and research assistant to Vice Admiral Stansfield Turner and also taught in the college's strategy and policy department.

== Civilian academic career ==
Hattendorf has spent most of his civilian academic career at the United States Naval War College, returning there as a civilian faculty member in 1977. He taught Strategy and Policy for several years. From 1988 to 2003, he directed the United States Naval War College's Advanced Research Department. In 2003, Hattendorf became the first chairman of the Naval War College's newly established Maritime History Department, where he oversaw its research section and served as director of the Naval War College Museum from January 2003 to September 2016. In 2015, the museum was recognized as one of the ten best College museums in the United States.

As a civilian scholar, he was a Visiting Professor of Military and Naval History at the National University of Singapore from 1981 to 1983, a senior associate member of St Antony's College, Oxford in 1986, an exchange scholar at the German Armed Forces Military History Research Office in 1990-1991, and a Visiting Fellow at Pembroke College, Oxford in 2001-2002. He served as an adjunct professor at the Frank C. Munson Institute of American Maritime History from 1990 to 2016 and served as its director from 1996 to 2001.

== Public and community service ==
Hattendorf served on the Secretary of the Navy's Advisory Subcommittee on Naval History from 2004 through 2008, serving as chairman, 2006–2008. He was a member of the Board of Advisors to the Canadian Forces College at Toronto, 2005–2010.

For four years from 2003 through 2007, Hattendorf served as president of the North American Society for Oceanic History and, in that role, headed the U.S. delegation to the International Commission for Maritime History. He served as one of the commission's vice-presidents, 2005–2009.

He is a fellow of the Royal Historical Society and has served as a member of council and vice-president of the Hakluyt Society (UK), and was the founding president of the American Friends of the Hakluyt Society. He has been a member of the Council of the Navy Records Society. From 1989 to 2021, he was co-chair of the publications committee of the Newport Historical Society, and from 2005 to 2019, historian of Trinity Church, Newport, Rhode Island, and served as a member of the Board of Scholars for the Museum of the American Revolution.

He has served as Historian-General of the Naval Order of the United States, 2014–2019; Historian of the Society of the Cincinnati in the State of Rhode Island and Providence Plantations, 2016- ; Historian of the Rhode Island Society of Colonial Wars, 2016- ; the Historian of the Rhode Island Sons of the Revolution, 2017-. and the Rhode Island Society of the Order of the Founders and Patriots of America, 2023-2025, then Governor, 2025-2026. He sat on the executive committee of the University of Haifa’s Maritime Policy & Strategy Research Center (HMS), 2016–2020.

== Awards ==
Kenyon College awarded him an honorary doctorate in 1997.

In 1998, Lyons Township High School named him to its Alumni Hall of Fame.

The National Maritime Museum, Greenwich (UK) awarded him its Caird Medal in 2000 for his contributions to the field of maritime history.

In 2003, the North American Society for Oceanic History (NASOH) presented him its K. Jack Bauer Award for service to maritime history.

In 2009, he received the Department of the Navy Superior Civilian Service Award for his work as chairman, Secretary of the Navy's Advisory Subcommittee on Naval History, 2006–2008. In addition, the USS Constitution Museum presented him with its Samuel Eliot Morison Award. and the Navy League of the United States presented him with its Alfred Thayer Mahan Award for Literary Achievement.

In 2012, the Naval Order of the United States awarded him its Admiral of the Navy George Dewey Award.

In 2014, The Naval Historical Foundation awarded him the Commodore Dudley W. Knox Naval History Lifetime Achievement Award.

In March 2016, the University of Oxford awarded Hattendorf a higher doctorate, the Doctor of Letters (D.Litt.) degree.

In September 2016, The Chief of Naval Operations, Admiral John Richardson presented him with the Navy Distinguished Civilian Service Award.

In September 2017, Hattendorf was the first recipient of Britain's Society for Nautical Research Anderson Award for Lifetime Achievement.

In May 2019, the Rhode Island Heritage Hall of Fame inducted Hattendorf.

In August 2024, Secretary of the Navy Carlos Del Toro, a former student of Hattendorf's, unveiled his official portrait by artist Gerald P. York at the Naval War College. At the unveiling ceremony, Del Toro noted that Hattendorf was “a legend here at the War College and a titan in the study of maritime history.”

In October 2024, the National Maritime Historical Society presented Hattendorf with its Distinguished Service Award in the Model Room of the New York Yacht Club in Manhattan.

The Royal Swedish Society of Naval Sciences awarded him its Gold Medal of Merit at Karlskrona, Sweden on 17 November 2025.

He is an honorary corresponding member of the Massachusetts Historical Society, the Royal Swedish Society of Naval Sciences, the Academie Du Var (France), and a Fellow of the Society for Nautical Research (U.K.). In 2008, he was elected an Associate Member the Class of Maritime History of the Portuguese Navy's Academia de Marinha. In March 2025, the Academia de Marinha promoted him to be one of its ten honorary members.

In 2011, the Naval War College announced the establishment of the Hattendorf Prize for Distinguished Original Research in Maritime History, named for him. The 2014 Oxford Naval Conference, "Strategy and the Sea," celebrated his career on April 10–12, 2014. The proceedings of the conference were published as a festschrift.

== Authorship ==
His histories range from studies on the War of the Spanish Succession to recent naval history. He has written readers' guides to the Aubrey-Maturin series of naval novels by Patrick O'Brian, as well as works on Alfred Thayer Mahan and Sir Julian Corbett.

He was senior editor of the series Classics of Sea Power for the U.S. Naval Institute Press and edited the series Maritime Books, 1475–1800, a collection of facsimiles of rare books from the John Carter Brown Library.

Hattendorf was a co-author of The Oxford Illustrated History of the Royal Navy and The Oxford Illustrated History of Modern Warfare, the latter with Richard Holmes and other authors. He contributed 22 articles to The Oxford Dictionary of National Biography (2005) and was editor-in-chief of the Oxford Encyclopedia of Maritime History (2007), which was awarded the 2008 Dartmouth Medal.

=== Books and monographs ===
- The Two Beginnings: a History of St. George's Church, Tanglin [Singapore] (1984)
- Sailors and Scholars: the Centennial History of the U.S. Naval War College (1984)
- England in the War of the Spanish Succession: a study of the English view and conduct of grand strategy, 1702–1712 (1987)
- Semper Eadem: a history of Trinity Church in Newport, 1698–2000 (2001; second edition in paperback, 2 vols., 2026)
- The Evolution of the U.S. Navy's Maritime Strategy, 1977–1986 (2004)
- Newport, the French Navy, and American Independence (2004; 2005)
- Sailors and Scholars: The History of the Naval War College, 1884-2009. 2nd Edition in two volumes, expanded and illustrated. (2025)
- Trafalgar (Oxford University Press, 2026)

=== Collected articles and essays ===
- Naval History and Maritime Strategy: Collected Essays (2000)
- Talking About Naval History: A Collection of Essays (2011)
- Reflections on Naval History: Collected Essays (2023).

=== Co-authored books ===
- America and the Sea: A Maritime History by Benjamin Woods Labaree, William M. Fowler, Jr., John B. Hattendorf, Jeffrey Safford, Edward W. Sloan, and Andrew German (1998)
- Harbors and high seas: an atlas and geographical guide to the complete Aubrey-Maturin novels of Patrick O'Brian by Dean King with John B. Hattendorf; maps by William Clipson, Jeffrey Ward, and Adam Merton Cooper (1996; 1999)

=== Edited historical documents ===
- The Writings of Stephen B. Luce edited with a commentary by John D. Hayes and John B. Hattendorf (1975)
- On His Majesty's service: observations of the British Home Fleet from the diary, reports, and letters of Joseph H. Wellings, Assistant U.S. Naval Attaché, London, 1940–41 edited by John B. Hattendorf (1983)
- Mahan on naval strategy: selections from the writings of Rear Admiral Alfred Thayer Mahan with an introduction by John B. Hattendorf, editor (1991)
- British Naval documents, 1204–1960 edited by John B. Hattendorf, R. J. B. Knight, A. W. H. Pearsall, N. A. M. Rodger, Geoffrey Till (1993)
- Saint Barthélemy and the Swedish West India Company: a selection of printed documents, 1784–1814, facsimile reproductions with an introduction by John B. Hattendorf (1994)
- John Robinson's Account of Sweden, 1688: the original 1688 manuscript, edited and collated with the 1693 manuscript and the published editions from 1694 with an introduction by John B. Hattendorf (1998)
- Every man will do his duty: an anthology of first-hand accounts from the age of Nelson, 1793–1815 Dean King with John B. Hattendorf [editors]; maps by Adam Merton Cooper (1997; 2002)
- U.S. Naval Strategy in the 1990s: Selected Documents (2006)
- U.S. Naval Strategy in the 1970s: Selected Documents (2007)
- U.S. Naval Strategy in the 1980s: Selected Documents (2008)
- Preparations for the Defense of Rhode Island, 1755 (2017)
- Albert P. Niblack, Putting Cargoes Through: The U.S. Navy at Gibraltar During the First World War, 1917-1919, edited with an introduction by John B. Hattendorf. (Gibraltar: Calpe Press, 2018).
- Mary Gould Almy’s Journal during the Siege of Newport, Rhode Island, 29 July to 24 August 1778. A Facsimile, Transcribed, Annotated, and Edited by John B. Hattendorf. (Rhode Island Sons of the Revolution, 2018).
- A Redcoat in America: The Diaries of Lieutenant William Bamford, 1757-1765 and 1776. (Warwick: Helion & Co., 2019).
- The Battle of Rhode Island in 1778: The Official British View as Reported in the London Gazette: A Facsimile with an Introduction and an Annotated Transcription by John B. Hattendorf (Newport: Stone Tower Press for Rhode Island Sons of the Revolution, 2021).
- To The Java Sea: Selections from the Diary, Letters, and Reports of Henry E. Eccles 1940–1942. (Newport: Naval War College Press, 2021).
- Recovering Naval Power: Henry Maydman and the Revival of the Royal Navy, edited by John Hattendorf and Geoffrey Till. (London: Routledge, 2023).
- Lieutenant-Colonel The Hon. Charles Stuart's Diary in Rhode Island, 29 July to 28 August 1778. A Facsimile, Transcribed, Annotated, and Edited with an Introduction and Additional Letters by John B. Hattendorf (Newport: Stone Tower Press for Rhode Island Sons of the Revolution, 2025).

=== Introductions to historical books ===
- Charles Nordhoff, Man-of-war life: a boy's experience in the United States Navy, during a voyage around the world in a ship-of-the-line [1855] (1985)
- J.C. Wylie, Military strategy: a general theory of power control (1967). (1989)
- Julian Corbett, Maritime operations in the Russo-Japanese War, 1904–1905 introduction by D. M. Schurman and John B. Hattendorf (1994)
- Tobias Gentleman, England's way to win wealth, and to employ ships and marriners (1614). Delmar, N.Y.: Published for the John Carter Brown Library by Scholars' Facsimiles & Reprints, (1995)
- Josiah Burchett, A Complete History of the Most Remarkable Transactions at Sea [1720] Delmar, N.Y.: Published for the John Carter Brown Library by Scholars' Facsimiles & Reprints, (1995)
- Joseph Conrad, The Rover (1923) ( 1999)
- Christopher Lloyd, Lord Cochrane: seaman, radical, liberator: a life of Thomas, Lord Cochrane, 10th Earl of Dundonald (1947). (1998)
- Lawrence C. Wroth, The Way of a Ship, An Essay in the Literature of Navigation Science, along with, Some American Contributions to the Art of Navigation, 1519–1802. Revised editions, edited with a foreword by John B. Hattendorf. (Providence: The John Carter Brown Library, 2011).

=== Edited collections ===
- Maritime strategy and the balance of power: Britain and America in the twentieth century edited by John B. Hattendorf and Robert S. Jordan; foreword by Robert O'Neill (1989)
- Limitations of military power: essays presented to Professor Norman Gibbs on his eightieth birthday edited by John B. Hattendorf and Malcolm H. Murfett; foreword by Andrew Goodpaster, Piers Mackesy and Sir Michael Pike (1990)
- The influence of history on Mahan: the proceedings of a conference marking the centenary of Alfred Thayer Mahan's The Influence of sea power upon history, 1660–1783 edited by John B. Hattendorf (1991)
- Mahan is not enough: the proceedings of a conference on the works of Sir Julian Corbett and Admiral Sir Herbert Richmond edited by James Goldrick and John B. Hattendorf (1993)
- Ubi sumus?: the state of naval and maritime history edited by John B. Hattendorf (1994)
- Maritime history: The Age of Discovery and The Eighteenth Century and the Classic Age of Sail, edited by John B. Hattendorf (1996–97)
- Naval policy and strategy in the Mediterranean: past, present and future edited by John B. Hattendorf (2000)
- War at sea in the Middle Ages and Renaissance edited by John B. Hattendorf and Richard W. Unger (2003)
- The Cold War at sea: an international appraisal guest editors Lyle J. Goldstein, John B. Hattendorf and Yuri M. Zhukov. Journal of Strategic Studies, (April 2005)
- Nineteen-Gun Salute: Case Studies of Operational, Strategic, and Diplomatic Naval Leadership during the 20th and Early 21st Centuries, edited by John B. Hattendorf and Bruce A. Elleman. (2010)
- Marlborough: Soldier and Diplomat, edited by John B. Hattendorf, Augustus J. Veenendaal, Jr., and Rolof van Hövell tot Westerflier (Rotterdam: Karwansaray, 2012).
- Charles XII: Warrior King, edited by John B. Hattendorf, Åsa Karlsson, Margriet Lacy-Bruijn, Augustus J. Veenendaal, Jr., and Rolof van Hövell tot Westerflier (Rotterdam: Karwansaray, 2018).
- Forging the Trident: Theodore Roosevelt and the United States Navy, edited by John B. Hattendorf and William P. Leeman (Annapolis: Naval Institute Press, 2020).

=== Proceedings of the International Seapower Symposium ===
- Eleventh International Seapower Symposium: report of proceedings of the conference, 6–9 October 1991, edited by John B. Hattendorf (1992)
- Twelfth International Seapower Symposium: report of proceedings of the conference, 7–10 November 1993 edited by John B. Hattendorf (1994)
- Thirteenth International Seapower Symposium: report of proceedings of the conference, 5–8 November 1995 edited by John B. Hattendorf (1995)
- Fourteenth International Seapower Symposium: report of the proceedings of the conference, 2–5 November 1997 edited by John B. Hattendorf (1998)
- Sixteenth International Seapower Symposium: report of the proceedings 26–29 October 2003, edited by John B. Hattendorf (2004)
- Seventeenth International Seapower Symposium: report of the proceedings 19–23 September 2005, edited by John B. Hattendorf (2006)
- Eighteenth International Seapower Symposium: report of the proceedings 17–19 October 2007, edited by John B. Hattendorf with John W. Kennedy (2009)
- Nineteenth International Seapower Symposium: report of the proceedings 6–9 October 2009, edited by John B. Hattendorf and John W. Kennedy (2010)
- Twentieth International Seapower Symposium: report of the proceedings 19-21 October 2011, edited by John B. Hattendorf and John W. Kennedy (2012)
- Twenty-First International Seapower Symposium: Report of the proceedings 16-19 September 2014, edited by John B. Hattendorf and John W. Kennedy (2015)
- Twenty-Second International Seapower Symposium: Report of the proceedings 20-23 September 2016, edited by John B. Hattendorf (2017)

=== Guides and registers to manuscript collections at the Naval War College ===
- Register of the papers of William L. Mullin compiled by John B. Hattendorf (1981)
- Register of the papers of Alfred T. Mahan (1986)
- Register of the papers of William McCarty Little compiled by John B. Hattendorf (1989)
- Register of the papers of Harrij Fredrich Louis Heinrich Schlie (1878–1916) and Gunther Wilhelm August Schlie (1906–1995)
- Register of the Papers of Admiral of the Fleet Sir James Hawkins Whitshed, GCB.

=== Dictionaries and encyclopedias ===
- A sea of words: a lexicon and companion for Patrick O'Brian's seafaring tales by Dean King, with John B. Hattendorf and J. Worth Estes (1995)
- Oxford Encyclopedia of Maritime History, John B. Hattendorf, editor-in-chief. Four volumes (2007)

=== Bibliographies ===
- A bibliography of the works of Alfred Thayer Mahan compiled by John B. Hattendorf and Lynn C. Hattendorf (1987)
- "A bibliography of the works of Admiral Sir Herbert Richmond" and "A bibliography of the works of Sir Julian Corbett" in Goldrick and Hattendorf, eds., Mahan is Not Enough, (1993)

=== Exhibition catalogues ===
- "The boundless deep...": the European conquest of the Oceans, 1450 to 1840: catalogue of an exhibition of rare books, maps, charts, prints and manuscripts relating to maritime history from the John Carter Brown Library (2003)
- Trafalgar and Nelson 200 : Catalogue of an exhibition of rare books, maps, charts, prints, models, and signal flags relating to events and influences of the Battle of Trafalgar and Lord Nelson (2005)
- Command of the Sea: Catalogue of an Exhibition of American Naval Art from the U.S. Naval Academy Museum, the U.S. Navy Art Collection, and the U.S. Naval War College Museum displayed at the Newport Art Museum, Newport, Rhode Island, 6 June – 12 August 2007 (2008)
- Faces of the Naval War College (2009)

=== Pictorial histories ===
A Dusty Path: A pictorial History of Kenyon College (1964)

=== Selected essays and articles ===
- "The Idea of the Fleet in Being in Historical Perspective",Naval War College Review (Winter 2014).
- "The Uses of Maritime History in and for the Navy"
- "Purpose and Contribution in Editing Naval Documents: A General Appreciation"
- ANI at 50: Sea Control and Seapower
