= Portage Point Inn Complex =

- U.S. National Register of Historic Places
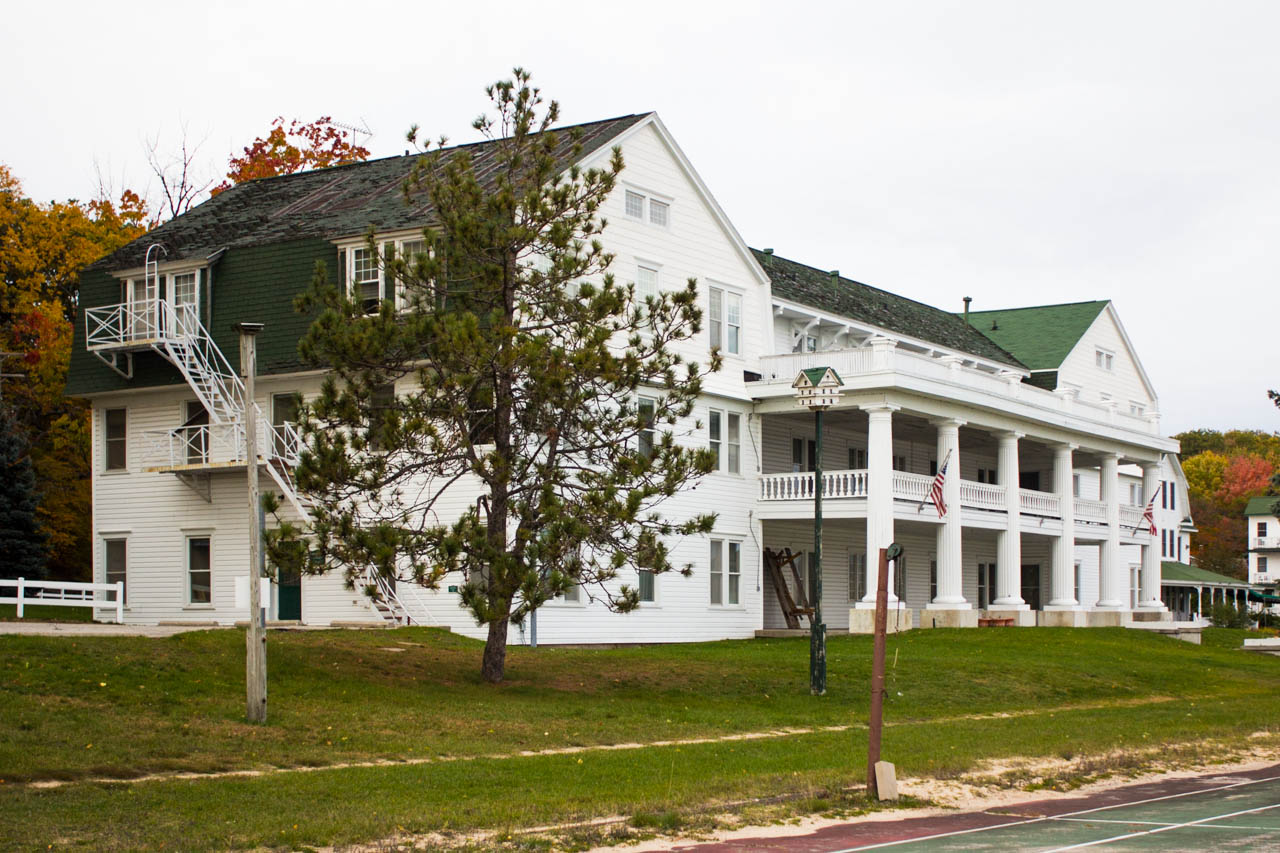

- Location within Michigan
- Interactive map
- Location: 8513 S. Portage Point Dr., Portage Point, Michigan
- Nearest city: Onekama, Michigan
- Coordinates: 44°22′2″N 86°15′31″W
- Area: 16.5 acres (6.7 ha)
- Built: 1902-1954
- Architectural style: Colonial Revival, Bungalow/Craftsman, Queen Anne
- NRHP reference No.: 85003001
- Added to NRHP: October 8, 1985

Portage Point Inn Complex is a resort hotel located at the western end of Portage Lake at Portage Point, Michigan. In October 1985, this 1902 resort hotel and its associated buildings was added to the National Register of Historic Places. It operates today as the Portage Point Resort.

== History ==
The area around Portage Lake was originally settled in the late 1800s during the lumber boom. A water-powered sawmill was constructed at the original outlet of Portage Lake, located a short distance from the inn, in 1845. The adjoining property on Portage Point, where the inn now stands, was purchased in 1869 by Lucius S. Marvin. By 1880, the mill and its associated buildings was moved a few miles away to Onekama.

As timberlands were exhausted and lumbering slowed in the 1890s, the potential of the lakeshore for recreational uses began to be exploited. Marvin sold the property on the Point to two associates, and in 1902 they turn they sold the property to a private development corporation, the Sunnyside Assembly. Sunnyside shortly changed their name to Portage Point Assembly, and construction of the Inn was started July 12, 1902. The building was opened for tourists in June 1903. Additional buildings, including a large Main Hotel, the Beech Lodge (Hotel Annex), a Casino / dancing pavilion, and twenty cottages were added during the next ten years. In addition, the channel leading to the complex was dredged, allowing larger steamers to dock directly at the hotel.

In 1909, the Northern Michigan Transportation Company, a steamship company, became involved as an investing and operating partner of the Inn, and in 1914 the company took over the management completely. The resort complex continued to expand rapidly. In 1932, the Inn was sold to J.J. Smith, who moved his clientele from the Pine Ridge Resort complex at Hamlin Lake near Ludington, after that resort burned. Smith owned the Inn until his death in 1960. The Inn continued to operate for a number of years, and experienced ups and downs. As of 2017, the resort was purchased by a developer, and rehabilitation plans are in the works.

== Description ==
The Portage Point Inn Complex is located on Portage Point, a peninsula which separates Lake Michigan from Portage Lake. The complex contains fifteen buildings constructed between 1902 and 1954; all but the last 1954 building contribute to the historic character of the complex. The buildings include:

- Original Inn (1901–02, 1913–14) The original inn is a three-story Colonial Revival structure with a gambrel roof, clad with white clapboards. Originally constructed in 1901/02, the veranda was enclosed in 1913/14.
- New Inn (Main Hotel) (1911–1912) The main hotel is a 3 1/2-story structure with a gambrel roof, fronted by a two-story portico with Tuscan columns.
- Casino/Dance Pavilion (1908) The casino is a rectangular, one-and-one-half-story structure with a high, gable roof surrounded by verandas.(torn down in 2024)
- Beech Lodge (1906) The Beech Lodge is an H-shaped, two-and-one-half-story cross-gable Craftsman structure with a steeply pitched roof supported by open triangular brackets. A wood beltcourse accents the structure.
- Hull House Cottage (1900–1901) The Hull House Cottage is a two-story, gable-roofed, structure clad with white clapboards. It has a Queen Anne style wraparound porch.
- Rexwood Cottage (1917) The Rexwood Cottage is single story T-shaped Colonial structure with a gable roof and a wooden square-post porch.
- Lakeview Cottage (c.1910) The Lakeview Cottage is single story L-shaped Colonial structure with a gable roof and a wooden square-post porch.
- Avalon Cottage (1911) The Avalon Cottage is single story L-shaped Craftsman structure clad with clapboards. It has a curved pergola-porch entry portico, and triangular stick brackets supporting broad eaves.
- Dollhouse Cottages 1-6 (190 and 1918). the Dollhouse Cottages are six identical single story end-gable structures with shed-roof porches.
- Terrace Building (1954) The Terrace building, designed by Cincinnati architect Jarres Nordloh, is a two-story Neo-Colonial structure with a gable roof and clad with white-painted shingle. Double-decker verandas face the lake.
