= G. C. Peden =

British historian

George C. Peden (born 1943) is an emeritus professor of history at Stirling University, Scotland.

== Career ==
Peden was born in Dundee and educated at Grove Academy, Broughty Ferry.

He worked for eight years as a sub-editor of the Dundee Evening Telegraph before becoming a mature student at Dundee University, graduating MA with first class honours in modern history in 1972. He was a postgraduate at Brasenose College, Oxford, completing his thesis under the supervision of Professor N. H. Gibbs and graduating with a D.Phil. in 1976.

He was a research fellow at the Institute of Historical Research in London and taught at Dundee and Leeds universities before becoming a lecturer in economic and social history, and then reader in economic history, Bristol University, 1977–1990; and professor of history, Stirling University, 1990–2008. He was a British Academy research reader, 1987–1989, and visiting fellow, All Souls College, Oxford, 1988–1989, and St Catherine's College, Oxford, 2002. He is a fellow of the Royal Society of Edinburgh.

== Publications ==
He has written about the British Treasury; Keynesian economics; economic aspects of defence and foreign policy; the welfare state, and some recent Scottish economic history.

=== Books ===
(listed with reviews that summarise contents)

- British Rearmament and the Treasury, 1932–1939 (Edinburgh, 1979) (English Historical Review, vol. 95, January 1980, p. 181).
- British Economic and Social Policy: Lloyd George to Margaret Thatcher (Oxford, 1985, 1991; Japanese edition: Chiba, 1990) (Political Studies, vol. 35, 1987, pp. 317–18).
- Keynes, the Treasury and British Economic Policy (London, 1988; Japanese edition: Tokyo, 1996) (Economic History Review, vol. 42, February 1989, p. 147-148).
- The Treasury and British Public Policy, 1906–1959 (Oxford, 2000) (Contemporary British History, vol. 16, autumn 2002, p. 238; Economica, vol. 69, August 2002, p. 528).
- (ed.) Keynes and his Critics: Treasury Responses to the Keynesian Revolution 1925–1946 (Oxford, 2004) (Journal of Economic History, vol. 66, March 2006, p. 248).
- (ed. with T. M. Devine and C. H. Lee) The Transformation of Scotland: The Economy since 1700 (Edinburgh, 2005) (History. vol. 91, January 2006, p. 113–114).
- Arms, Economics and British Strategy: From Dreadnoughts to Hydrogen Bombs (Cambridge, 2007) (International History Review, vol. 30, March 2008, p. 147; RUSI Journal, vol. 152, April 2007, p. 108).
- Churchill, Chamberlain and Appeasement (Cambridge, 2022) (Journal of European Studies, vol. 53, June 2023, pp. 198–199).

=== Articles in journals and chapters in books ===
- 'Sir Warren Fisher and British rearmament against Germany', English Historical Review, vol. 94 (1979), pp. 29–47.
- 'Keynes, the Treasury and unemployment in the later 1930s', Oxford Economic Papers, vol. 32 (1980), pp. 1–18.
- 'Keynes, the economics of rearmament and appeasement', in W. J. Mommsen and J. Kettenacker (eds), The Fascist Challenge and Appeasement (London 1983), pp. 142–56.
- 'Sir Richard Hopkins and the 'Keynesian revolution' in employment policy, 1929-45', Economic History Review, vol. 36 (1983), pp. 281–96.
- 'The Treasury as the central department of government, 1919–1939', Public Administration, vol. 61 (1983), pp. 235–50.
- 'Arms, government and businessmen, 1935–1945', in J. Turner (ed.), Businessmen and Politics: Studies of Business Activity in British Politics, 1900-1945 (London, 1984), pp. 130–45 and 191–3.
- 'The burden of imperial defence and the continental commitment reconsidered', Historical Journal, vol. 27 (1984), pp. 405–23.
- 'A matter of timing: the economic background to British foreign policy, 1937–1939', History, vol. 69 (1984), pp. 15–28 - also published as 'Perceptions britanniques de la puissance economique a la fin des annees 1930', in R. Girault and R. Frank (eds), La Puissance en Europe 1938-1940 (Paris, 1984), pp. 187–202.
- 'The 'Treasury view' on public works and employment in the interwar period', Economic History Review, vol. 37, (1984), pp. 167–81.
- 'Economic aspects of British perceptions of power on the eve of the Cold War', in J. Becker and F. Knipping (eds), Power in Europe? Great Britain, France, Italy and Germany in a Postwar World, 1945-1950 (Berlin and New York, 1986), pp. 237–61.
- 'Keynes', in S. Glynn and A. Booth (eds), The Road to Full Employment (London, 1987), pp. 97–108.
- 'Britain in the 1930s: a managed economy? A comment, Economic History Review, vol. 42 (1989), pp. 538–534.
- 'Old dogs and new tricks: the British Treasury and Keynesian economics in the 1940s and 1950s', in M. O. Furner and B. Supple (eds), The State and Economic Knowledge: The American and British Experiences (Cambridge, 1990), pp. 208–38.
- 'Winston Churchill, Neville Chamberlain and the defence of Empire', in J. B. Hattendorf and M. H. Murfettt (eds), The Limitations of Military Power (London, 1990), pp. 160–72.
- 'Economic aspects of British perceptions of power', in E. Di Nolfo (ed.), Power in Europe? II: Great Britain, France, Germany and Italy and the Origins of the EEC, 1952-1957 (Berlin and New York, 1992), pp. 139–59.
- 'An agenda for the economic history of twentieth-century Scotland', Scottish Economic and Social History, vol. 13 (1993), pp. 5–26.
- 'Modernisierung in den 50er Jahren - die britische Erfahrung', in A. Schildt and A. Sywottek (eds), Modernisierung im Wiederaufbau. Die westdeutsche Gesellschaft der 50er Jahre (Bonn, 1993, 1998), pp. 47–68.
- 'The road to and from Gairloch: Lloyd George, unemployment, inflation, and the 'Treasury view' in 1921', Twentieth Century British History, vol. 4 (1993), pp. 224–49.
- 'Economic Knowledge and the state in modern Britain', in S. J. D. Green and R. C. Whiting (eds), The Boundaries of the State in modern Britain (Cambridge, 1996), pp. 170–87.
- 'The Treasury view in the interwar period: an example of political economy?' in B. Corry (ed.), Unemployment and the Economists (Cheltenham, 1996), pp. 69–88.
- 'From cheap government to efficient government: the political economy of public expenditure, 1832–1914', in D. Winch and P. K. O'Brien (eds), The Political Economy of British Economic Experience, 1688-1914 (Oxford, 2002), pp. 351–78.
- 'New revisionists and the Keynesian era in British economic policy: a comment', Economic History Review, vol. 56 (2003), pp. 118–124.
- 'British Treasury responses to the Keynesian revolution, 1925–1939', Annals of the Society for the History of Economic Thought, no. 44 (2003), pp. 31–44.
- 'The Treasury and the City', in R. Michie and P. Williamson (eds), The British Government and the City of London in the Twentieth Century (Cambridge, 2004), pp. 117–34.
- 'The managed economy: Scotland', 1919–2000, in T. M. Devine, C. H. Lee and G. C. Peden (eds), The Transformation of Scotland: The Economy since 1700 (Edinburgh, 2005), pp. 233–65.
- 'Keynes and British economic policy', in R. E. Backhouse and B. W. Bateman (eds), The Cambridge Companion to Keynes (Cambridge, 2006), pp. 98–117.
- 'The Treasury and the defence of empire', in G. Kennedy (ed.), Imperial Defence: The Old World Order 1856-1956 (London, 2008), pp. 71–110
- 'Financing Churchill's army', in K. Neilson and G. Kennedy (eds), The British Way in Warfare: Power and the International System, 1856-1956 (Farnham, 2010), pp. 277–99
- 'Sir Horace Wilson and appeasement', Historical Journal, vol. 53 (2010), pp. 983–1014.
- 'War and peace: the British Army after the victories of 1918 and 1945', in P. Dennis and J. Grey (eds), Victory or Defeat: Armies in the Aftermath of Conflict (Newport, NSW, 2010), pp. 81–103.
- 'A new Scotland? The economy', in T. M. Devine and J. Wormald (eds), The Oxford Handbook of Modern Scottish History (Oxford, 2012), pp. 652–70.
- 'Suez and Britain's decline as a world power', Historical Journal, vol. 55 (2012), pp. 1073–1096.
- 'Recognising and responding to relative decline: The case of post-war Britain', Diplomacy & Statecraft, vol. 24 (2013), pp. 59–76.
- (with Alan Peacock) 'Merging National Insurance contributions and income tax: lessons of history', Economic Affairs, vol. 34 (2014), pp. 2–13.
- 'Chamberlain, the British Army and the 'continental commitment' ', in M. Murfett (ed.), Shaping British Foreign and Defence Policy in the Twentieth Century (Basingstoke, 2014), pp. 86–110.
- 'The Royal Navy and Grand Strategy, 1937–1941', in N. Rodger, J. Dancy, B. Darnell and E. Wilson (eds), Strategy and the Sea (Woodbridge, 2016), pp. 148–58.
- 'Liberal economists and the British welfare state: from Beveridge to the New Right', in Roger E. Backhouse, Bradley W. Bateman, Tamotsu Nishizawa and Dieter Plehwe (eds), Liberalism and the Welfare State (New York, 2017), pp. 39–56.
- 'Neoliberal economists and the British welfare state, 1942–1975', Journal of the History of Economic Thought, vol. 39 (2017), pp. 413–27.
- 'The growth of Cabinet government', in Hew Strachan (ed.), The British Home Front and the First World War (Cambridge, 2023), pp. 63–77.
- 'Mary Brooksbank and everyday life in a women's town', Women's History Review, online September 2026 Open access. Doi 10.1080/09612025.2026.2729910.
