= Femme Gaastra =

Dutch maritime historian

Femme Simon Gaastra (23 July 1945 - July 2026) was a Dutch Professor of maritime history at the University of Leiden and a leading expert on the history of the Dutch East India Company.

== Early life and education ==
Gaastra was born in Leeuwarden. He attended the Rijks Lyceum in Heerenveen and began his studies in history at the University of Leiden in 1965, receiving his doctorate in March 1972.

== Academic career ==
In 1972–73, he began working as a researcher with the Nederlandse Organisatie voor Zuiver Wetenschappelijk Onderzoek on Dutch-Asiatic Shipping. In 1973–74, he taught history in Haarlem, then in March 1974, the University of Leiden appointed him as a university docent. In 2004, he succeeded Jaap R. Bruijn, as Professor of Maritime History. Gaastra retired from this post at the University of Leiden in June 2010 and was succeeded by Hendrik J. den Heijer, a specialist in the history of the Dutch West India Company.

== Published works ==
- Kerk, cultuur en koloniën. Opstellen over Nederland rond 1900 aangeboden aan Jan Bank bij zijn afscheid als hoogleraar Vaderlandse Geschiedenis aan de Universiteit van Leiden, 27 mei 2005 edited by Bart Erik van der Boom; Femme Simon Gaastra; and Jan Theodoor Maria Bank. [Amsterdam]: Balans, 2005.
- Vragen over de koopvaardij: de 'Enquête omtrent den toestand van de Nederlandsche koopvaardijvloot' uit 1874 en de achteruitgang van de handelsvloot. Inaugurele rede Universiteit Leiden. Leiden, 2004.
- The Dutch East India Company: expansion and decline. Zutphen: Walburg Pers, 2003.
- Particuliere geldstromen binnen het VOC-bedrijf 1640-1795. Leiden: Rijksmuseum Het Koninklijk Penningkabinet, 2002.
- On the eighteenth century as a category of Asian history: Van Leur in retrospect, edited by Leonard Blussé and Femme Gaastra. Aldershot: Ashgate, 1998.
- Ships, sailors and spices: East India companies and their shipping in the 16th, 17th and 18th centuries, ed. by Jaap R. Bruijn and Femme S. Gaastra. Amsterdam: NEHA, 1993.
- De archieven van de Verenigde Oostindische Compagnie = The archives of the Dutch East India Company: (1602–1795), M.A.P. Meilink-Roelofsz (inventaris); R. Raben en H. Spijkerman ed. 's-Gravenhage: Sdu Uitgeverij, 1992.
- Dutch-Asiatic shipping in the 17th and 18th centuries, by J.R. Bruijn, F.S. Gaastra and I. Schöffer; with assist. from A.C.J. Vermeulen. Three Volumes. Rijks geschiedkundige publicatiën, Grote serie, 165-167. The Hague: Nijhoff, 1979- 1987.
- De geschiedenis van de VOC. Haarlem: Fibula-Van Dishoeck, 1982; Antwerpen: Standaard, 1982. Zutphen: Walburg Pers, 1991, 2002.
- Companies and trade: essays on overseas trading companies during the Ancien Régime, by P. H. Boulle ... [et al.]; ed. by Leonard Blussé and Femme Gaastra. [The Hague]: Leiden University Press, 1981.
- Bewind en Belied bij de VOC: De financiële politik van de bewindhebbers, 1672-1702. Zutphen: De Walburg Pers, 1968.

== Sources ==
- Biographical statement in Bewind en Beleid
- Catalogue of the Royal Library, The Hague
