= Mary Gould Almy =

Early American diarist (1735–1808)

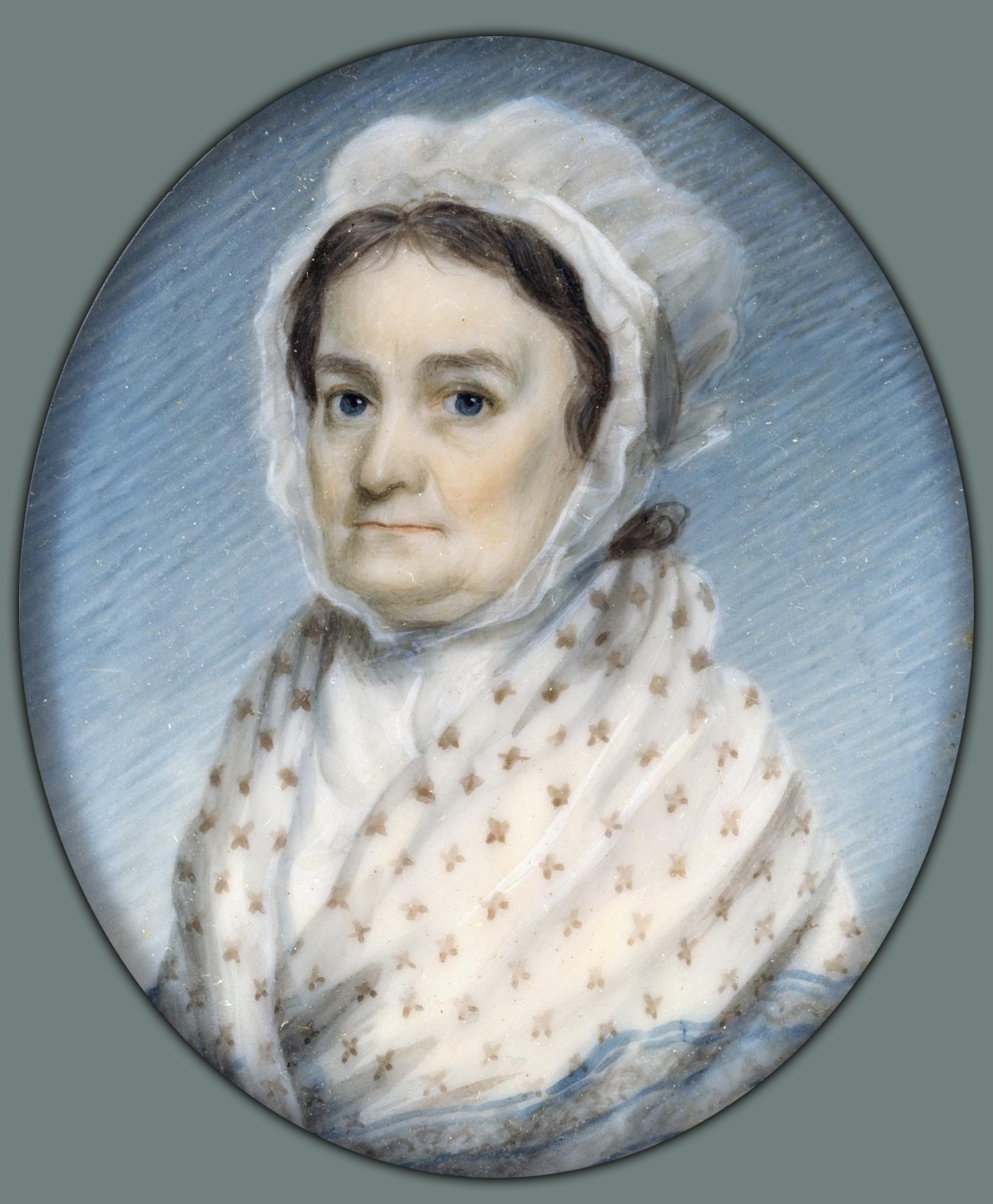
- Miniature of Almy by Edward Greene Malbone
- Born: Mary Gould; December 16, 1735; Newport, Rhode Island
- Died: March 25, 1808 (aged 72); Newport, Rhode Island
- Occupation: Diarist
- Notable work: Mrs. Almy's Journal

Mary Gould Almy (1735–1808) was a diarist during the American Revolution. She lived in Newport, Rhode Island, where she ran a boarding house. She kept a journal in 1778 documenting the events leading up to the Battle of Rhode Island. Though she had Loyalist views, her husband fought for the Continental Army.

The original copy of her journal is held by Newport's Redwood Library and Athenaeum. It was first published 100 years after she wrote it. Naval historian John B. Hattendorf published an annotated version of the journal in 2018.

== Early life and family ==
Mary Gould was born on December 16, 1735, in Newport, Rhode Island, the fourth of eight children of Mary (née Rathbone) (Note: Also Rathbun.) and schoolteacher James Gould (d. 1768). Their family were Quakers and her father had inherited considerable wealth. His spending habits were said to be lavish, and upon his death debts attached to his estate left little for his children.

Mary was the great-granddaughter of Walter Clarke, who had been the Governor of the Colony of Rhode Island and Providence Plantations. Three of her brothers were lost at sea. Her sister Patience married Augustus Johnston, who was a stamp distributor during the controversial 1765 Stamp Act.

She married Benjamin Almy, an Anglican, in 1762 at Newport's Trinity Church. They had eight children.

== Revolutionary War ==
Almy was a Loyalist. She welcomed the British occupation of Newport in December 1776 and held disdain for the French for supposing they could "reign lords of the sea".

Around 1775, the Jahleel Brenton Townhouse, a mansion on Thames Street owned by Jahleel Brenton, was confiscated by American patriots. The Almy family took up residence there and Almy ran a boarding house in the townhouse from around 1778 until 1790.

In July 1778, Almy's husband joined the Continental Army. While women elsewhere in the colonies suffered indignities and were otherwise punished for siding with the Tories, Almy's position as the wife of a Continental soldier and her legal dependency on her husband under property laws of the era may have shielded her from harassment or punishment.

=== Almy's 1778 journal ===
Almy started keeping a journal of the events in Newport on July 29, 1778, coinciding with the arrival of the French fleet of Charles Henri Hector d'Estaing. Entries in her journal are addressed to her husband and document her Loyalist sympathies, the hardships her family experienced during the siege on Newport, as well as her hopes for the health and success of her husband.

Almy's journal covers the events in Newport leading up to the Battle of Rhode Island on August 29, 1778. During the summer months, British forces in and around the city were besieged by the Continental Army and the French fleet. After the French ships began shelling parts of Newport on August 7, Almy led her mother and children to a house outside of town she had rented where they could be safe.

When I look over the list of my friends on both sides of the question, my heart shudders at the thought, what numbers must be slain, both so obstinate, so determined. Well may we say, what havoc does ambition make! Cursed Frenchmen! They [the Americans] would not have come, had it not been for you.

After the August 1778 Battle of Rhode Island, Almy finished her journal. She later gave it to a friend with instructions that it should only be read by her sister.

== Later life ==
Almy continued to run her boarding house out of the Jahleel Brenton Townhouse following the Revolutionary War. Thomas Jefferson was a guest at Almy's in June 1784. Her most famous guest was George Washington, who stayed a night there on August 17, 1790, during his trip to Rhode Island. Almy saved the silk bed covering from the bed where Washington slept.

Around 1797, the painter Edward Greene Malbone composed a watercolor portrait miniature of Almy, painted on ivory.

Almy died on March 25, 1808, in Newport. (Note: Records from RIAMCO list her date of death as April 23, 1808.) She was buried in Newport's Common Burying Ground.

== Publishing of her journal ==
As a historical document, Almy's journal is important in providing the perspective of a Loyalist woman and context for Newport's involvement in the American Revolution.

Almy's journal passed into the hands of her grandson Conrad C. Ellery. He made a copy of the journal in 1878, correcting spelling and grammar, and donated the journal to the Redwood Library and Athenaeum on August 17, 1878. The journal was published in the first issue of The Newport Historical Magazine in July 1880. Ellery also had the journal published in 1881. The Newport Mercury published Almy's journal in four parts in September 1917. The journal was also published in Elizabeth Evans' 1975 book Weathering the Storm: Women of the American Revolution. In 2018, naval historian John B. Hattendorf published Mary Gould Almy’s Journal, an annotated version of Almy's original journal. He regards Almy's journal as one of the most important extant documents of Newport's history during the American Revolution.

The original manuscript is held by Newport's Redwood Library and Athenaeum.
