= Admiral of the Navy George Dewey Award =

The Admiral of the Navy George Dewey Award is an annual award of the Naval Order of the United States to honor a U.S. citizen eligible for regular membership in the Naval Order, who has established a record of exemplary service that sets that individual apart from his or her peers.

== History ==
In 2001, former Commander General of the Naval Order of the United States Rear Admiral William F. Merlin, USCG, (ret.) proposed the establishment of a new award for the Naval Order to honor a senior civilian official for "unique achievements by that individual based on exceptional insight, persistent effort and firm determination to continually advance the paramount interests of the United States and its Sea Services. The award is a 12-inch by 15-inch plaque bearing the Seal of the Naval Order in the center, flanked by the obverse and reverse of the large Naval Order Cross. The award is named in honor of Admiral of the Navy George Dewey, who served as Commander General of the Naval order from 1907 to 1917. Presentation is made at a formal ceremony, preferably the annual Naval Order annual congress. It was first awarded in 2002 to former President George H. W. Bush.

== Recipients ==
- 2002 George H. W. Bush
- 2003 Dr. Robert Ballard
- 2005 Jeremiah Denton
- 2006 Gordon R. England
- 2007 George Shultz
- 2009 John W. Warner
- 2010 Thomas J. Cassidy Jr.
- 2011 James L. Holloway III
- 2012 John B. Hattendorf
- 2013 J. Phillip "Jack" London
- 2014 John F. Lehman Jr.
- 2015 Frederick W. Smith
- 2016 Everett Alvarez Jr.
- 2017 Robert J. Stevens
- 2018 Marshal P. Cloyd
- 2019 Admiral James R. Hogg
- 2022 Rear Admiral Grace Hopper. Posthumous award.
- 2023 Captain Don Walsh, USN (Ret.), PhD
- 2024 Ambassador J. William Middendorf II
- 2025 Rear Admiral Thomas Charles Lynch
- 2026 Secretary of the Navy Carlos Del Toro.
