= James R. Hogg =

United States admiral

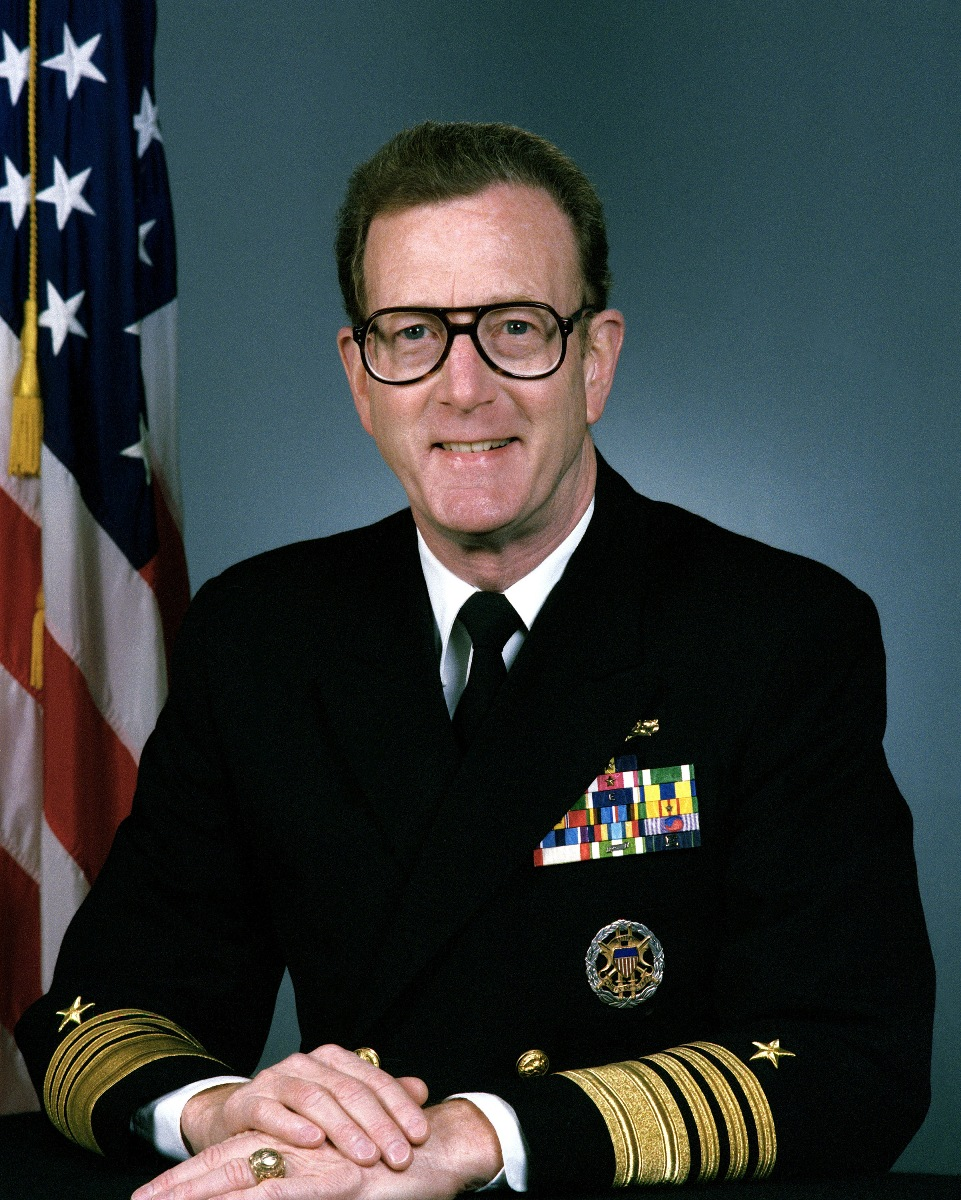
- Adm. James R. Hogg in 1990
- Born: November 23, 1934; Annapolis, Maryland, U.S.
- Died: January 2, 2025 (aged 90); Newport, Rhode Island, U.S.
- Burial place: United States Naval Academy Cemetery
- Military career
- Allegiance: United States of America
- Branch: United States Navy
- Service years: 1956–1991
- Rank: Admiral
- Commands: United States Seventh Fleet; USS England
- Awards: Distinguished Service Medal (3); Legion of Merit (3)
- Other work: President, NSIA; Director, Strategic Studies Group

James Robert Hogg (November 23, 1934 – January 2, 2025) was a United States Navy four star admiral who served as U.S. Military Representative to the NATO Military Committee (USMILREP) from 1988 to 1991. He retired from the Navy in 1991; and then served as the director of the Chief of Naval Operation's Strategic Studies Group (SSG) for 18 years. His cumulative service to the U.S. Navy, when he retired from the SSG in 2013, was 57 years.

== Biography ==
James Robert Hogg was born on November 23, 1934 in Annapolis, Maryland Hogg's father, James Henry Hogg, retired from the U.S. Navy as a rear admiral; and, earned a Silver Star for his actions during the Battle of Leyte Gulf.

Hogg graduated from the United States Naval Academy and was commissioned in the Navy in June 1956. He served for thirty-five years, attaining the rank of admiral in October 1988.

His sea commands included a guided missile cruiser, two destroyer squadrons, and a cruiser-destroyer flotilla. He commanded the United States Seventh Fleet from May 1983 to March 1985.

His Staff service included assignment as Executive Assistant to the Chief of Naval Personnel, Director of Military Personnel Policy, and Director of Naval Warfare working in the areas of military requirements and acquisition.

Before retirement from the Navy in May 1991, he served three years as the U.S. representative to the NATO Military Committee. He also served for four years as President of the National Security Industrial Association, a major national defense industry association of some 400 companies of all sizes from all segments of industry that relate to U.S. national security.

Admiral Hogg, in addition to the U.S. Naval Academy, was a graduate of the U.S. Air Force Air Command and Staff College and held a degree of Master of Science in Business Administration at George Washington University. While on active duty he was awarded the Distinguished Service Medal (three), the Legion of Merit (three) and other U.S. and foreign decorations. He received the Vice Admiral Charles E. Weakley Award (1989), the Betsy Ross Freedom Award (1991), the Rolland M. Teel Award (1995), the U.S. Naval Academy Distinguished Graduate Award (2018), and the Admiral of the Navy George Dewey Award (2019).

In July 1995, Hogg was appointed the Director of the Chief of Naval Operations Strategic Studies Group, from which he retired in mid-2013.

Hogg died on January 2, 2025, at the age of 90. He was buried on February 14, 2025, with a military ceremony at the United States Naval Academy.

== Awards and decorations ==

Badge	Surface Warfare Officer Pin		
1st Row	Navy Distinguished Service Medal with two gold award stars		Legion of Merit with two award stars
2nd Row	Meritorious Service Medal with award star	Navy and Marine Corps Commendation Medal	Navy Meritorious Unit Commendation
3rd row	Navy Distinguished Civilian Service Award	Navy "E" Ribbon	Navy Expeditionary Medal
4th Row	National Defense Service Medal with one bronze service star	Armed Forces Expeditionary Medal	Vietnam Service Medal with silver service star
5th row	Humanitarian Service Medal	Navy Sea Service Deployment Ribbon	Korean Order of National Security Merit, Gukseon Medal
6th row	China Order of the Cloud and Banner with Grand Cordon	Vietnam Campaign Medal	Navy Expert Pistol Shot Medal
Badge	Joint Chiefs of Staff Identification Badge		
