= Kenneth S. Wagoner =

American psychologist, professor of psychology, and a physiological skin scientist

Kenneth Shrout Wagoner
- Born: July 8, 1911; Waldron, Indiana, U.S.
- Died: April 5, 2000 (aged 88)
- Education: DePauw University; Washington University in St. Louis
- Scientific career
- Fields: Psychology
- Workplaces: Florida State University

Kenneth Shrout Wagoner (July 8, 1911 - April 5, 2000) was an American psychologist, a professor of psychology on the faculty of DePauw University, and a physiological skin scientist.

== Early life and education ==
Born in Waldron, Indiana, the son of Otto Wagoner and his wife, Nannie Shrout Wagoner, he graduated from DePauw University in 1932 and studied at the Marine Biological Laboratory in Woods Hole, Massachusetts. Then, he went on to do graduate work at Washington University in St. Louis, where he completed his M.A. in 1932 with a thesis on "The effect of warmth stimulation of one hand upon the temperature limen in the contralateral hand" and his Ph.D. in 1938 with a dissertation on "The effect of warmth and cold stimulation of one hand upon the skin temperature of the contralateral hand."

He married Beverely Meal on 20 December 1946. The couple had two sons.

== Academic career ==
In 1943, Tufts University appointed Wagoner Instructor in Psychology and Research Associate in the Research Laboratory of Sensory Psychology. While at Tufts, he served as senior research psychologist for the U.S. Office of Scientific Research and Development and was awarded a Certificate of Merit from that office for his research work during World War II. Wagoner joined the Depauw University faculty in 1946, where he was director of Experimental Psychology from 1946 to 1977, rising to professor and chairman of the Psychology Department from 1952 until his retirement in 1977. He also served as visiting professor at Florida State University in 1956 and was a consultant for research projects at Florida State University under contract with the Surgeon General of the United States from 1956 to 1963. DePauw University appointed him professor emeritus in 1977.

After retirement, Wagoner lived for a number of years at Portage Point, Michigan, where his family had spent many summers. While living there, he served as commodore of the Portage Lake Yacht Club and was a member of the Onekama Township Planning Commission. Shortly before, his death, he moved to Rockville, Indiana, where he died. He was buried at Moscow, Indiana.

Wagoner is credited with discovering new ways that humans perceive hot and cold in the skin senses. "He isolated vasodilation and vasoconstriction as mechanisms that signal the brain that we are hot and cold." In addition, he discovered a key homeostasis feedback mechanism that helps humans maintain survival temperature.

He was a member of Gobin Memorial United Methodist Church in Greencastle, Indiana. His professional memberships included the American Psychological Association, the Psychonomic Society, American Association for the Advancement of Science, American Association of University Professors as well as Sigma Xi and Psi Chi fraternities.

DePauw University has named a faculty chair for him, The Kenneth S. Wagoner Chair in Psychology.

== Publications ==
- "The insensitivity of the cornea to heat and pain derived from high temperatures" by J. P. Nafe, K.S. Wagoner, in American Journal of Psychology, Vol. 49, No. 4 (Oct., 1937), pp. 631–635.
- "The Effect of Adaptation upon Vascular Reactions to Thermal Stimuli" by John Paul Nafe in American Journal of Psychology Vol. 49, No. 4 (Oct., 1937), pp. 645–649.
- "The Effect of Pain upon Peripheral Blood Volume" by J.P. Nafe, K.S. Wagoner, in American Journal of Psychology (1938)
- "The Dependency of Cold upon Vascular Action: Studies with Nerve Block" by J.P. Nafe, K.S. Wagoner, in American Journal of Psychology (1939)
- "The Nature of Being Human" by K. S. Wagoner in The Journal of Higher Education, (1961).
