= John Daniel Hayes =

American historian

- Born: January 23, 1902; New York City, New York, U.S.
- Died: March 29, 1991 (aged 89); Cary, North Carolina, U.S.
- Military career
- Allegiance: United States
- Branch: United States Navy
- Service years: 1919–1954
- Rank: Rear Admiral
- Commands: USS Hunt; USS Breckinridge
- Conflicts: World War II
- Other work: Naval historian

John Daniel Hayes (January 23, 1902 – March 29, 1991) was a rear admiral in the United States Navy and a naval historian.

== Naval career ==
John Hayes enlisted in the U.S. Navy in 1919 and in 1920 entered the United States Naval Academy, graduating in 1924. After his initial sea duty assignments, he entered the Naval Postgraduate School in 1931 and continued his studies for his Master of Science degree at the University of California, Berkeley, which awarded him that degree in 1933.

Hayes became an instructor in engineering at the Naval Postgraduate School in 1937–39, and then went on to command the destroyers Hunt and Breckinridge before serving as chief engineer in the heavy cruiser Astoria in 1941. Hayes was in Astoria, during the Battle of Savo Island, during which he was wounded and Astoria was sunk. After recovering from his wounds, he served on the staff of the Commander, Transport Division, Third Amphibious Force, South Pacific. Then, in 1944, he graduated from the Naval War College and was assigned as Planning Officer, Seventh Amphibious Force, with which he participated in the landings of the XXIV Army Corps and the III Amphibious Corps in North China in 1945.

In 1946, Hayes returned from the Pacific to serve as Operations Officer, Amphibious Force, Atlantic Fleet, and in the Strategic Plans Division, Office of the Chief of Naval Operations. In 1947, he became war plans officer, Caribbean Sea Frontier until being assigned as a student at the Industrial College of the Armed Forces in 1949–50. After serving at sea as Commander, Service Squadron One, he returned to the Industrial College of the Armed Forces as a member of the faculty from 1951 until his retirement in 1954.

== Later career ==
On retirement, Hayes was promoted to rear admiral. From 1956 to 1958, he edited Shipmate, the alumni magazine of the United States Naval Academy, and during this period wrote a regular column in it entitled "With a Round Turn". He regularly contributed articles on contemporary merchant marine affairs to the U.S. Naval Institute Proceedings and was a special correspondent for international shipping magazine Fairplay.

He edited the letters of Rear Admiral Samuel F. DuPont, but never completed his biography and edition of the letters of Rear Admiral Stephen B. Luce, which he deposited at the Naval War College.

He served as President of the American Military Institute in 1954–57. In 1988, the Naval Historical Center named its pre-doctoral fellowship in his honor, recognizing his many years of inspirational teaching among young naval historians.

== Published works ==
- Samuel Francis Du Pont: a selection from his Civil War letters, edited by John D. Hayes. Three volumes. Ithaca, N.Y., Published for the Eleutherian Mills Historical Library by Cornell University Press, 1969.
- The Writings of Stephen B. Luce, edited with commentary by John D. Hayes and John B. Hattendorf. Newport, R.I.: Naval War College Press, 1977.
