= N. H. Gibbs =

Norman Henry Gibbs (17 April 1910, in London – 20 April 1990, in Witney, Oxfordshire) was Chichele Professor of the History of War at Oxford University for 24 years from 1953 to 1977, the longest tenure of all who have held the chair since its establishment in 1909.

== Education and early career ==
Gibbs was an Open Exhibitioner at Magdalen College, Oxford, in 1928, becoming Senior Demy in 1928. After completing his bachelor's degree, he continued his graduate studies at Magdalen and while doing so was appointed assistant lecturer at University College, London in 1934–36. In 1935, Gibbs completed his D.Phil. thesis in medieval history under the direction of K. B. McFarlane on 'The history of Reading in the later Middle Ages, considered with special reference to the importance of the gild merchant in mediaeval seigniorial boroughs. In 1936, he was appointed tutor in modern history at Merton College, Oxford.

At the outbreak of the Second World War in 1939, Gibbs joined the 1st King's Dragoon Guards. During his military service, he first developed an interest in military history. In 1943, he was one of the first officers to be seconded to the Cabinet Office, at the beginning on the work to write the official history of the war.

While in the Cabinet Office, Gibbs wrote a study on British troops in Egypt during the pre-war years and their preparedness for the campaign against German troops under General Erwin Rommel in the Western Desert. Completing that work, he went on to be an assistant to Professor W. K. Hancock and wrote a detailed study on the structure of the British government and its relationships to the armed forces from 1850 through the Second World War. After demobilisation, Gibbs returned to his fellowship at Merton College, Oxford, where he taught modern history and philosophy, politics, and economics (PPE). In 1952, he published a revised edition of A. B. Keith's British Cabinet Government, making significant additions on the history of the British War Cabinet. At this time, he began working on the first volume of the official history of Second World War in the Grand Strategy series , to be entitled Rearmament Policy.

== Chichele Professor ==
Gibbs's election to the Chichele Chair at the age of 42 marked a turning point in the study of military and naval history at Oxford. All of his predecessors had been career military men, self-trained historians, or journalists. Not only was Gibbs one of Oxford's own academic historians, he was one of the few already established historians in Britain to have direct experience of the most recent historical research and writing within the British armed forces. His appointment marked a very important change by which war history became a respectable academic field and allowed Oxford to play a major role in the development of military and strategic studies throughout the Cold War era, providing additionally an important academic link between Oxford and the armed forces.

Gibbs's tenure in the chair developed on three lines: First, he continued the research and writing that he had begun in the Cabinet Office. Second, he promoted closer and more direct educational relationships between Oxford and the armed forces, contributing to better civil-military relations. Third, while primarily interested in military history and naval history, he promoted the development of the new field of strategic studies.

Norman Gibb's Inaugural Lecture as Chichele Professor of the History of War was devoted to The Origins of the Committee of Imperial Defence. It quickly became a basic reference for generations of his graduate students.

In his work with the uniformed services, he established with a series of courses for officers of the Royal Air Force to qualify them for further studies at the staff college level. Gibbs's success in this, led him to expand his teaching to include senior officers and to encourage the services to second officers from their regiments to read for undergraduate degrees at Oxford. This led the Admiralty to appoint Gibbs to its Naval Educational Advisory Council, which saw him rise to become its vice-chairman and then chairman.

In 1965, Gibbs established an annual series of NATO conferences at St. John's College, Oxford, which brought academics together with senior NATO officials and the Supreme Allied Commander, Europe each summer.

With Professor Max Beloff, Gibbs began a series of seminars that were the earliest contributions to strategic studies in the United Kingdom. With Piers Mackesy, he taught the undergraduate special subject in military history and took on the supervision of a wide range of graduate students. In addition, he managed the newly established Visiting Fellows programme at All Souls College, Oxford.

He served on the council of the International Institute for Strategic Studies, the council of the Royal United Services Institute and was a research associate at the Center of International Studies at Princeton University in 1965–66. He was visiting professor in the Department of History at the University of New Brunswick in 1975–76; the United States Military Academy in 1978–79, and the National University of Singapore in 1981–82.

In 1979, the Superintendent of the United States Military Academy, General Andrew Jackson Goodpaster awarded Gibbs the U.S. Army's Outstanding Civilian Service Medal for the superb quality of his teaching and in recognition of his many contributions as Chichele professor to military education.

Among his graduate student pupils who later become well known were Colin S. Gray, John B. Hattendorf, Robert S. Jordan, Malcolm Murfett, Robert O'Neill, George C. Peden, N.A.M. Rodger, Charles S. Townshend, and Jehuda L. Wallach.

== Published writings ==
- Makers of England by N. H. Gibbs and L.W.T. Gibbs (1935).
- The British Cabinet system by Arthur Berriedale Keith. 2nd ed by N. H. Gibbs (1952).
- The origins of imperial defence: an inaugural lecture delivered before the University of Oxford on 8 June 1955 (1955).
- The Soviet System and Democratic Society edited by N. H. Gibbs (1967).
- Grand strategy, volume I: Rearmament policy (1976).
