= Naval Order of the United States =

Naval hereditary organization

The Naval Order of the United States was established in 1890 as a hereditary organization in the United States for members of the American sea services. Its primary mission is to encourage research and writing on naval and maritime subjects and preserve documents, portraits, and other records of prominent figures, deeds and memories of American naval and maritime history.

== History ==
The Naval Order of the United States traces its origin to the initiative of Charles Calhoun Philbrook, Charles Frederick Bacon Philbrook, and Franklin Senter Frisbie, who met in Boston, Massachusetts, on 4 July 1890 to take the first step toward establishing an organization that was originally named the Naval Commandery of the United States of America. Its purpose was to commemorate the seagoing services of their ancestors' naval service. The original eligibility for membership was based upon service "in any of the wars or in any battle in which the United States Navy or Marine Corps has participated, or who served as above in connection with the Revenue or Privateer Services." Four months later, on the 115th anniversary of the U.S. Marine Corps, 10 November 1890, the organization was established on a permanent basis and branches were established in several states. Three years later on 19 July 1893, the Naval Commandery began discussions with a smaller organization that had similar aims: the Naval Legion of the United States. The result of these talks resulted in the formal merger of the two organizations as the Naval Order of the United States. The formal meeting of the new and expanded organization took place on 15 August 1893 at Faneuil Hall, Boston, where the Naval Order adopted its constitution that created local commanderies in the various states with members becoming Companions of the Naval Order.

== Membership criteria ==
- Regular members - any United States citizen, who has served or is serving as an officer or enlisted member of the United States Navy, U.S. Marine Corps, the U.S. Coast Guard and any other federal military maritime service of the United States or its allies and their descendants over 18 years of age, who are US citizens.
- Associate members - spouses of present and deceased regular members, and those, other than United States citizens, who have served or are serving honorably as commissioned officers in an allied seagoing service. Also, the Naval Order may confer either associate or honorary membership upon individuals who are not otherwise eligible for regular or associate membership, if they have distinguished themselves in the interest of naval service.

== National awards by the Order ==
The Order presents a number of annual awards as part of its furtherance of its mission, including three awards to the U. S. Naval Academy midshipmen who score the highest in competitive examinations on national and international political science issues; an award to the outstanding graduate of the Chief of Naval Air Training Command Flight Officer program; awards to the outstanding midshipmen and cadets at the U.S. Merchant Marine Academy, at the State University of New York Maritime College, the California Maritime Academy, and at Naval Reserve Officer Training Corps programs at various universities, as well as an award to the outstanding junior officer instructor at the U.S. Coast Guard Academy.

The Naval Order’s most prestigious awards are:

- Admiral of the Navy George Dewey Award
- Distinguished Sea Service Award

=== Awards by local commanderies ===
- Samuel Eliot Morison Award for Naval Literature, awarded by the New York Commandery
- Admiral Nimitz Leadership Award, awarded by the Texas Commandery

== Commanders-General of the Naval Order of the United States ==
The Commanders-General of the Naval Order of the United States have been:

- Charles Calhoun Philbrook, 1890–1893
- Lieutenant Commander John Codman Soley, 1893–1895
- Rear Admiral John Grimes Walker, 1895–1907
- Admiral of the Navy George Dewey, 1907-1917
- Rear Admiral Francis J. Higginson, 1917-1925
- Captain Herbert Livingston Satterlee, 1925-1928
- Rear Admiral Albert Gleaves, 1928-1931
- Rear Admiral Reginald R. Belknap, 1931-1937
- Commander Frederick Bernard Craven, 1937-1943
- Captain James Harvey Tomb, 1943-1946
- Vice Admiral William Augustus Read, 1946-1949
- Commander Charles Hann, Jr., 1949-1958
- Rear Admiral Thurston H. James, 1958-1961
- Captain Douglas Wilson Dodge, 1962-1964
- Captain Jeremiah Francis O'Shea, 1964-1966
- Admiral Joseph James Clark, 1966-1969
- Captain Robert Granville Burke, 1969-1971
- Captain Malcolm Townsend Munger, 1971-1973
- Rear Admiral Alban Weber,
- Captain Robert Bashford Bolt,
- Captain Edward Sydney Anderson,
- Captain Albert Frederick Kempe,
- Lieutenant Commander Raymond Edward Cross,
- Rear Admiral Winston Holbrook Weese,
- Commander Stanley John Majka,
- Captain Federick Daniel Carl,
- Captain John Charles Rice, Jr.,
- Captain Wallace Howard Lloyd, Jr.,
- Captain William Richard Bremer,
- Rear Admiral William Firman Merlin,
- Captain James Franklin Brooke III,
- Rear Admiral Lester Robert Smith,
- Rear Admiral Thomas Francis Brown, III
- Captain Fred Case Hawkins, Jr.
- Captain Carter Barry Conlin
- Captain Kenneth Albin Johnson
- Captain Gregory F. Streeter, 2009–2011
- Rear Admiral Douglas M. Moore, Jr., 2011–2013
- Captain Vance H. Morrison, 2013–2015
- Captain Michele Lockwood, USN, 2015–2017
- Captain Paul H. Crissy, USCG, 2017–2019
- Colonel Allan F.P. Cruz, USMC, 2020–2021

== Notable companions of the Naval Order of the United States ==
Members of the Naval Order have included Presidents, members of the Cabinet, and high-ranking naval and marine officers. Civilian companions have included:

- Robert Means Thompson
- Bishop William Stevens Perry, no. 50 - Episcopal Bishop of Iowa
- Professor Robert G. Albion, no. 3322
- Loyall Farragut - son of Admiral David Farragut
- Professor E. B. Potter, no. 5793
- Dr. William S. Dudley, no. 7336
- Mr. Howland H. Pell, Jr., no. 694
- Dr. Mark Felton
- Tory Bruno, no. 7846, President of Blue Origin National Security, former CEO of United Launch Alliance

== External sources ==
- Official Website of the Naval Order of the United States
