= Arthur B. Chapman =

American geneticist

Arthur Barclay Chapman (28 October 1908 – 29 December 2004) was the University of Wisconsin–Madison's "most accomplished animal genetic researcher."

== Early life and education ==
Chapman was born in Windermere, Westmorland, England. The son of William Daniel Chapman, a physician, and his wife Nora Moss Chapman, Arthur "Chappie" Chapman attended St. Bees School until the age of sixteen, when he decided to become a sheep farmer in New Zealand. En route in 1925, he came to the United States, but got only as far as Pullman, Washington, where on the advice of a relative he took a course in animal husbandry at Washington State University. He stayed for five years, earning his Bachelor of Science degree in 1930. Following graduation, Iowa State University appointed him a teaching fellow under the supervision of Jay L. Lush, earning his Master of Science degree in 1931. During this period, he became particularly interested Sewall Wright's approaches to quantitative animal breeding and population genetics. His interests in selection theory and inbreeding were increased with Sir Ronald Fisher's visit to Iowa State during the summer of 1931.

In the autumn of 1931, Chapman went on to further studies at the University of Wisconsin–Madison as a graduate student under Professor Leon J. Cole. Under his direction, Chapman completed his Ph.D. in 1935.

A year before he completed his degree, Chapman was married on 1 September 1934 to Winifred Mary Rollin (5 January 1911 – 18 August 2004), the daughter of Hugh and Margaret Rollin of Western Springs, Illinois, who had emigrated from Riding Mill, Northumberland, England, in 1913. Winnie and Chappie had three daughters. Through his marriage, Chapman came to spend his summers with his family at Portage Point, Michigan, where his parents-in-law had a summer home and where he became an avid fisherman on Portage Lake.

== Academic career ==
Upon completing his doctorate, Chapman spent a year of post-doctoral research with Jay L. Lush at Iowa State University and Sewall Wright at the University of Chicago. In 1936, Chapman returned to the University of Wisconsin–Madison as a member of the faculty of Animal husbandry. He rose to become Professor of Genetics in 1947 and, in 1972, was appointed Professor of Animal Breeding and Genetics in the Department of Meat and Animal Science and the Department of Genetics and Dairy Science. He was appointed professor emeritus in 1975.

Active as a teacher, he had a total of 42 master's degree students and 33 Ph.D. students during his long career at the University of Wisconsin. An active and very popular teacher with students, he taught an undergraduate agricultural short course every winter as well as courses on genetics and animal breeding.

In his research, Chapman was closely associated with that of his colleague Lester Earl Casida, a reproductive physiologist. Together, they taught a large number of students.

Among his many awards, Arthur Chapman received a Rockefeller Foundation Award for teaching and research in Poland in 1960 and a Fulbright Fellowship and a Guggenheim Fellowship in New Zealand in 1966–1967.

Chapman was active in a large number of professional organizations, most importantly the American Society of Animal Science, starting with that society's journal, the Journal of Animal Science, of which he served as associate editor in 1958-1960 and editor, 1961–1963. The Society awarded him its Animal Breeding and Genetics Award in 1969, its Morrison Award in 1974. He was elected a Fellow of the Society in 1972 and served as the Society's president in 1964–1965.

In addition, he was a member of the Genetics Society of America, the American Genetic Association, the International Biometric Society, the American Dairy Science Association, the British Society of Animal Production, the New Zealand Society of Animal Production, and the Egyptian Society of Genetics. He was a Fellow of the American Association for the Advancement of Science, and an honorary member of Sigma Xi, Alpha Zeta, Gamma Alpha, Phi Sigma, and Gamma Sigma Delta.

Chapman died in Madison, Wisconsin.

== Published works ==
Chapman published some 125 scientific papers during his career, almost all coauthored with graduate students and colleagues at the University of Wisconsin.

In addition, he edited: Jay L. Lush, General and quantitative genetics, edited by A.B. Chapman. Amsterdam; New York: Elsevier Science Pub. Co., 1985.

Jay L. Lush, The genetics of populations. Ames: Iowa Agriculture and Home Economics Experiment Station, College of Agriculture, Iowa State University, 1994.

And wrote several articles of biographies on the distinguished leaders in his academic field, many of whom had influenced him in his own career:

- G. E. Dickerson and A. B. Chapman, "Sewall Wright, 1889-1988: a brief biography", J Anim Sci 1992 70: 3281–3285.
- A. B. Chapman and G. E. Dickerson, "George Colvin Humphrey, 1875-1947: a brief biography",J Anim Sci 1992 70: 2607–2610.
- A. B. Chapman, "Jay Laurence Lush 1896-1982: a brief biography", J Anim Sci 1991 69: 2671–2676.
- Gordon E. Dickerson and Arthur B. Chapman, "Leon Jacob Cole, 1877–1948: A Brief Biography", J Anim Sci 1989 67: 1653–1656.

== Sources ==
- Memorial Resolution of the Faculty of the University of Wisconsin on the Death of Professor Emeritus Arthur B. Chapman
- Obituary, Wisconsin State Journal, 2 January 2005
- "Chapman, UW Star in Animal Genetics, Dies", Wisconsin State Journal, Sunday, 2 January 2005.
