= Charles Ritcheson =

American academic and diplomat (1925–2011)

- Born: February 26, 1925; Maysville, Oklahoma
- Died: December 8, 2011 (aged 86); Washington, D.C.
- Occupations: historian, diplomat, university administrator
- Writing career
- Genre: British history
- Subject: 1760-1815

Charles Ray Ritcheson (26 February 1925 – 8 December 2011) was an American historian, diplomat, and university administrator.

== Early life and education ==
The son of Charles Frederick Ritcheson and Jewell Vaughn, Ritcheson was raised in Oklahoma and attended the University of Oklahoma. Interrupting his studies, he served in the U.S. Naval Reserve from 1942 to 1945, becoming a Lieutenant, Junior Grade. When Admiral Elliott Buckmaster took command of Task Force 74 operating in the South China Seas, Ritcheson joined his staff as Signal Officer. After the end of the war, Ritcheson returned to his studies and obtained his Bachelor of Arts degree in philosophy and classics in 1946. After postgraduate study in history at Zurich University in 1947 and Harvard University in 1948, he went to St Edmund Hall, Oxford, where he was awarded his D.Phil. in 1951 with a thesis on "The impact of the American problem on British politics, 1760–1780".

== Academic career ==
In 1951, Oklahoma College for Women appointed him assistant professor of history and then promoted him to associate professor in 1952. Kenyon College appointed him associate professor in 1953 and professor in 1960. In 1964–65, he served as chairman of the history department at Kenyon, before taking up an appointment as chairman and director of graduate studies in history at Southern Methodist University, a position he held until 1970. During that period, he was also director of the Center for Ibero-American Civilization, 1967–68. In 1970–71, he served as director with rank of dean library advancement. In 1971–74, he served as Colin Rhys Professor of British History at the University of Southern California, and then became cultural attaché (Foreign Service Officer Grade 1) at the American Embassy, London. Returning from his diplomatic assignment in the United Kingdom, he became Lovell Distinguished Professor, 1977–1984 and was awarded the university prize for creative scholarship. Between 1984 and 1990, he was the university professor, university librarian, and dean and special advisor to the university's president. Upon his retirement in 1990, the University of Southern California appointed him university professor emeritus, and university librarian and dean emeritus. In 2000, he was additionally appointed distinguished emeritus professor.

Ritcheson served as founding president of the Southern Conference on British Studies, 1967–70, and of the Pacific Coast branch Conference on British Studies, 1971–73, then executive secretary, National Conference of British Studies (today the North American Conference on British Studies), from 1973 to 1974. In 1978, he founded (with Sir John Plumb) the British Institute of the United States. He was twice a presidential appointee to the National Council on Humanities, 1982–1986, and 1988–90, and a presidential appointee also to the board of foreign scholarships.

Ritcheson served as chairman, U.S.-U.K. Educational Commission, 1974–77, and official observer, British Bicentennial Liaison Committee, 1974–1976. He has been a member of the advisory council of the Ditchley Foundation, 1974–2002, the international advisory council of University of Buckingham, member of the board of the Friends of the Royal Opera and Ballet, Covent Garden, and vice president of the American Friends of Covent Garden, 1982–85. When he retired from the University of Southern California in 1991, he became executive vice-president of the not for profit Fund for Arts and Culture in Eastern Europe from 1991 to 1996, and was country director for Hungary and subsequently Poland. In 1997 he became executive vice president for planning for the Trust for Museum Exhibitions based in Washington, D.C.

Ritcheson is a member of Phi Beta Kappa, Fellow of the Royal Historical Society, a member of the Texas Institute of Letters, the Société Française d'Archeologie, Association pour le rayonnement de l'Opéra national de Paris, Brooks's, the Beefsteak Club, London, and the Cosmos Club, Washington, D.C.

== Honours ==
Pe-Et Society (Oklahoma U.), 1943, Phi Beta Kappa (Oklahoma U., alumnus membership, 1961); Eli Lilly Research Fellow, 1954; research fellow, American Council of Learned Societies, 1955–57; Fulbright Scholar, Oxford University, 1949–50; Fulbright Professor, Edinburgh and Cambridge Universities, 1962–63; Honorary Fellow in History, University College, London, 1974; Watson Lecturer, Leicester University, 1975; Hon. Member, Senior Common Room, St. Edmund Hall, Oxford, 1974–77; Hon. D.Litt., Leicester U., 1976; honorary grant of arms by special command, the College of Heralds, London; the University Award for Creative Scholarship, USC, 1980; Citation by Korean Community of Southern California for founding the USC Korean Heritage Library; the Ritcheson Executive Suite, Leavey Library and portrait; and Ritcheson Special Collection funded by Friends of the USC Libraries; Crystal Book Award for founding Scriptor to recognize the year's best realization of a book in film; at his retirement from USC in 1990, Joint Resolution by the board of trustees, president, Faculty, and Student Body expressing thanks for his leadership in founding the modern USC Library System. University professor, university librarian and dean emeritus, 1990. In 1992, he was additionally named distinguished emeritus professor, and in 2000, USC gave him the Faculty Lifetime Achievement Award. The Ritcheson Fellowship in History at St Edmund Hall, Oxford was named for Charles and Alice Ritcheson.

== Published works ==
- British politics and the American Revolution, Norman : University of Oklahoma Press, 1954; Westport, Conn.: Greenwood Press, 1981.
- Aftermath of revolution: British policy toward the United States, 1783–1795, Dallas : Southern Methodist University Press, 1969.
- The American Revolution: the Anglo-American relation, 1763-1794: interpretive articles and documentary sources, Edited by Charles R. Ritcheson. Reading, Mass.: Addison-Wesley Pub. Co., [1969].
- Edmund Burke and the American Revolution, The Sir George Watson Lecture for 1976. [Leicester]: Leicester University Press; [Atlantic Highlands] N.J.:distributed by Humanities Press, 1976.

About 100 articles and reviews in learned journals.
