= Oxford Encyclopedia of Maritime History =

2007 encyclopedia

- Author: John B. Hattendorf, editor in chief
- Language: English
- Subject: Maritime history
- Genre: Encyclopedia
- Publisher: Oxford University Press
- Publication date: 2 April 2007
- Publication place: United Kingdom
- Media type: Print and online
- Pages: Four volumes (2,912 p.)
- ISBN: 978-0-19-513075-1
- OCLC: 76901969
- Dewey Decimal: 623.803
- LC Class: VK15 .O84 2007

The Oxford Encyclopedia of Maritime History, written by University of Oxford editor in chief John B. Hattendorf, was published by the Oxford University Press in 2007. The encyclopedia was issued in four volumes available in the Oxford Digital Library. The encyclopedia contains more than 950 articles devoted to global maritime history.

In summarizing its contents, the Oxford University Press states that:

The Encyclopedia covers the entire history of seafaring, from ancient Egyptian shipbuilders to the nuclear submarines and supertankers of today. Over nine hundred articles written by leading historians examine all aspects of maritime history, including naval history, shipbuilding, biographies of major figures, navigation and scientific instrumentation, maritime art and literature, commerce and economics, and international law. Placing maritime affairs in their larger historical context, the Encyclopedia shows how seafaring has both reflected and influenced the major economic, cultural, military, and political developments in world history.

== Awards ==
- Professional and Scholarly Publishing Division (PSP) of the Association of American Publishers 2007 Awards for Excellence: Honorable Mention in the "Best of Multivolume Reference" Category
- Library Journal Best Reference of 2007
- North American Society for Oceanic History's 2007 John Lyman Book Award in the Reference Category

=== Dartmouth Medal ===
In January 2008, the American Library Association at its annual meeting in Philadelphia announced that it would award its Dartmouth Medal to the Encyclopedia of Maritime History. The ALA news release explained:

Of all the titles the Dartmouth Medal Committee considered for this year's award, one left the others in its wake. You might say it floated to the top, or that it swam past the competition. The Oxford Encyclopedia of Maritime History is the first English-language scholarly reference log of its kind. Its four volumes hold a cargo of nearly one thousand signed entries and four hundred illustrations. One can scarcely fathom the depths of its contents. It contains all the seafaring topics you may expect "Shipwrecks," "Navigators," and "Ballast" and many you may not "Film," "Terrorism," and "Religion." Not only did the international crew of naval, academic, and independent authors admirably achieve their goal of creating an interdisciplinary resource, they also made it fun. This title is destined to be the flagship resource in maritime history for years to come.
