= Pilot (1914 boat) =

1914 museum ship in San Diego, California

Coordinates: 32.721104°N 117.174336°W

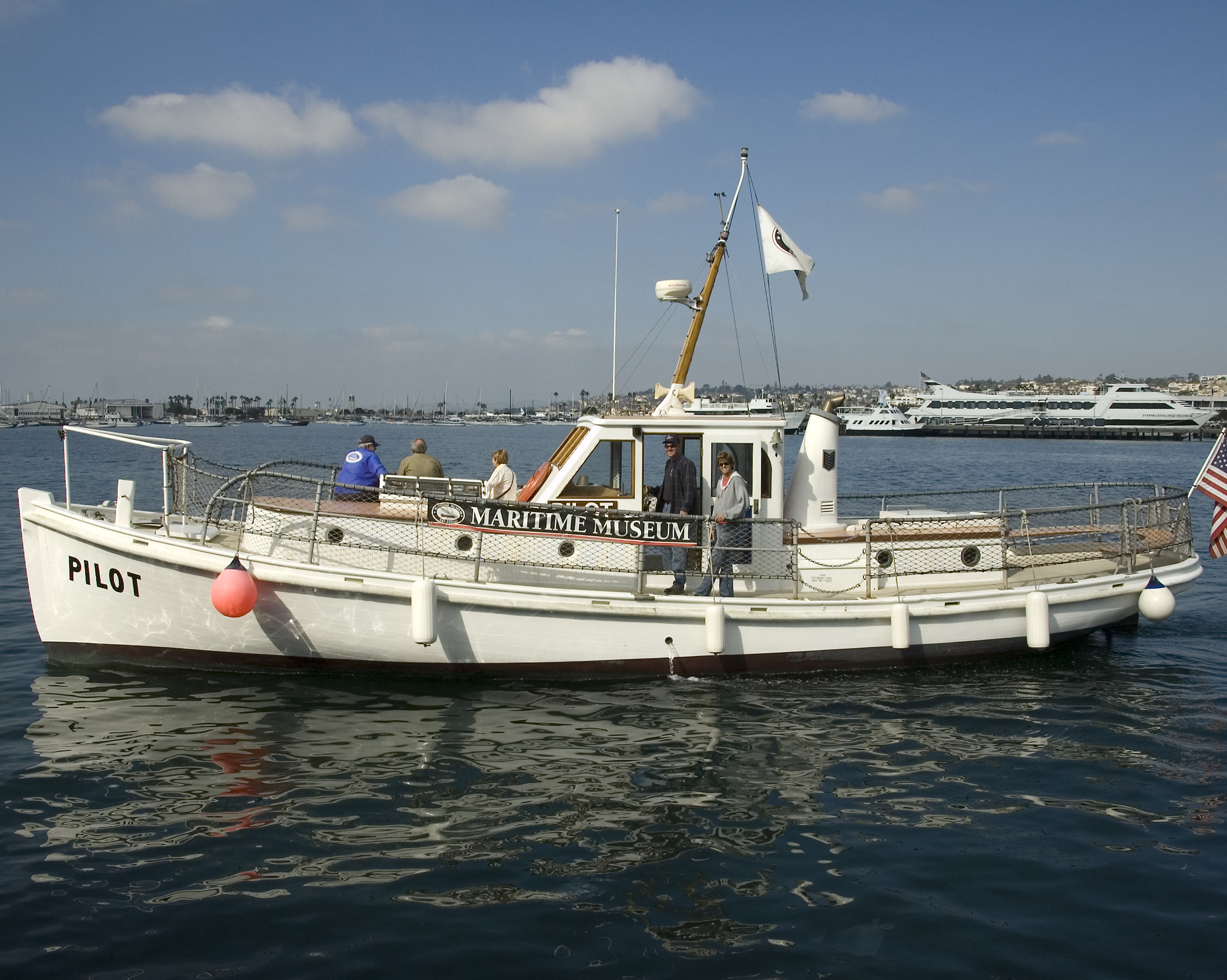

History

United States
- Builder: Manuel Goularte
- Launched: 1914
- Status: Sea-going museum ship

General characteristics
- Type: Pilot boat
- Tonnage: 19 GT
- Length: 52 ft (16 m)
- Installed power: Diesel
- Speed: 8–10 knots (15–19 km/h; 9.2–11.5 mph)
- Pilot (pilot boat)
- U.S. National Register of Historic Places
- Location within California
- Location: Maritime Museum of San Diego; 1492 N Harbor Dr. San Diego
- NRHP reference No.: 10001160

Pilot is a pilot boat and museum ship in San Diego, California. She was launched in 1914 in San Diego, built in the local boatyard of Manuel Goularte. She is a 52-foot wooden diesel-powered vessel. She was the first powered pilot boat in San Diego. She served as the official pilot boat of San Diego Bay for 82 years, with no more than three consecutive days of downtime.

During World War II, the Coast Guard used her as a pilot boat and patrol boat. She received six six-month service chevrons.

She was donated to the Maritime Museum of San Diego in 1996 and underwent restoration. Pilot now hosts educational tours of San Diego Bay, and sometimes accompanies other historic vessels (most notably, Star of India) into and out of the bay.
