= Juan Rodríguez Cabrillo =

16th-century Iberian maritime explorer of North America

Juan Rodríguez Cabrillo João Rodrigues Cabrilho
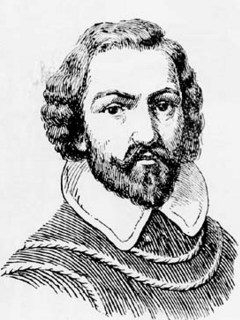
- Posthumous depiction of Cabrillo
- Born: c. 1497; Lapela de Cabril, Montalegre, Kingdom of Portugal
- Died: January 3, 1543 (aged 45–46); San Miguel Island, California
- Known for: First European in Alta California

Juan Rodríguez Cabrillo (Portuguese: João Rodrigues Cabrilho; c. 1497 – January 3, 1543) was a Portuguese maritime explorer best known for investigations of the west coast of North America, undertaken on behalf of the Spanish Empire. He was the first European to explore present-day Alta California, navigating along the coast of California in 1542–1543 on his voyage from New Spain (modern Mexico).

== Nationality ==
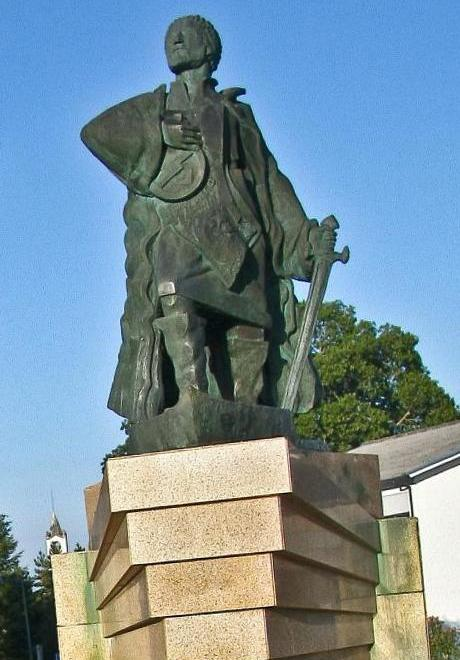
Monument to Cabrillo in Montalegre, Portugal traditionally considered to be his hometown.

Cabrillo's nationality – Spanish or Portuguese – has been debated more recently. He was described as Portuguese by Spanish chronicler Antonio de Herrera y Tordesillas; in his Historia General de los hechos de los Castellanos en las Islas y tierra firme del Mar Oceano, written 60 years after Cabrillo's death, Herrera referred to Cabrillo as Juan Rodriguez Cabrillo.

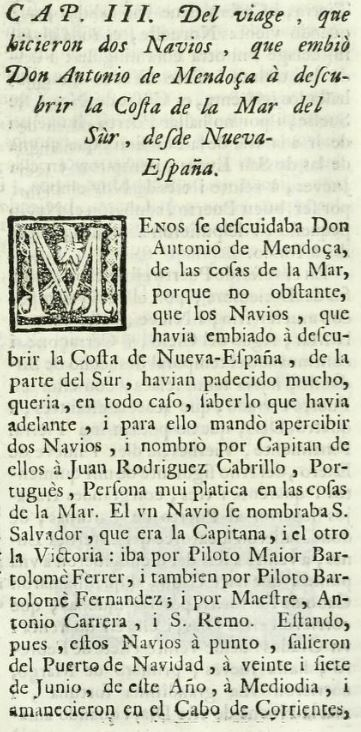
Spain's Royal Chronicler, Antonio de Herrera y Tordesillas, wrote that Cabrilho was a Portuguese navigator, c. 1615.

Of the few locations in Portugal who used to claim to be his birthplace, only Lapela de Cabril keeps having some legitimacy to do so. However, the source for Herrera's description is unknown. Certain historians, such as Edward Kritzler, claim that Cabrillo was possibly descended from Jewish conversos. Others point to the many flaws in Kritzler's work, including lack of evidence for such claims.

Some historians have long believed that Cabrillo was from Spain, and a set of documents discovered in 2015 gave strength to that opinion. A witness from a 1532 lawsuit, named Juan Rodriguez Cabrillo, testified under oath that he was "natural" [sic] of Palma de Micergilio, which many misunderstood as if being born or native of now Palma del Río, a town in the province of Córdoba in Spain. As an example of the difference between being born/native and natural/naturalized F. Pizarro himself used to say he was "natural y nacido" (natural and born) in Trujillo, Spain. Other details of the witness's biography match known facts about the explorer. A leader of San Diego's Portuguese community cautioned that the new evidence must be carefully evaluated, and requested that copies of the documents be turned over to the Portuguese government for study.

Lapela, in the parish of Cabril and a municipality of Montalegre (Portugal), is the region where allegedly the nickname "Cabrilha" originated. It became the surname Cabrilho and was pronounced at the time Cabrilhe in Galician and Cabrillo in Spanish, according to the historian João Soares Tavares, biographer of João Rodrigues Cabrilho. The name still exists in Portugal as a surname, and several localities named Cabril in Beira Alta and neighboring regions such as Castro Daire, Viseu or Pampilhosa da Serra have been claimed as Cabrillo's birthplace. In Lapela there is an ancient house where local tradition claims he was born. Local people, and alleged local descendants of branches of his ancient family with the same surname ("Rodrigues Cabrilho"), call the house Casa do Galego (House of the Galician) and Casa do Americano (House of the American).

In January 2023, a new preprint (now peer reviewed and published in the Bulletin for Spanish and Portuguese Historical Studies) announced new documents about a Rodrigues family living in São Lourenço de Cabril around 1520.

Alvar Nunes, a Portuguese pilot, was the co-owner of the ship Santa María de Buena Esperança, which was very likely rebaptized as Santa María de La Victoria, Cabrilho's fleet's second largest ship. As a result, it is likely that the two largest ships in the fleet that discovered California were property of Portuguese seamen. António Fernandes, another Portuguese also living in Nicaragua, was the possible owner of the ship Anton Hernandez, indicated alternatively as the second largest ship in Cabrilho's fleet.

According to Cabrilho's elder son, his father was one of the first settlers of Nicaragua. In November 1529, Juan Rodríguez portugués and Alvar Nuñez portugués were in Léon de Nicaragua, paying for the gold mines of Santa María de Buena Esperança defence garrison, suggesting Cabrilho was Portuguese. Bartolome Ferrer, Cabrilho's pilot major, was not Spanish-born but from Albissola, Savona, near Genoa.

Carbon-14 data validates the early 1530s as the time when Cabrilho offered a crucifix to his Rodrigues family in Lapela de Cabril, in agreement with their ancestral family tradition.

The 2023 paper also presents a 1604 California Spanish-based map, made by the Florentine cartographer Matteo di Jacopo Neroni da Peccioli, where the toponym Cabrilho's Bay (B. de Cabrilho) shows at nearly 40 degrees north. The navigator's name is written in the Portuguese form (with lh) for the first time in any known map of that period. Since the 1604 map dates from around the same time as Herrera's statement (around 1615) about Cabrilho being Portuguese, the appearance of Cabrilho's name in this old map provides support to Cabrilho's Portuguese nationality.

Other than Cabrilho's Bay in California, the paper also presents a 1758 document showing that Mount Cabrilho was located nearby Lapela de Cabril, thus proving that Cabrilho indeed existed as a name in Portugal.

== Voyages ==
Cabrillo depicted claiming California for the Spanish Empire in 1542, in a mural at Santa Barbara County Courthouse, painted by Dan Sayre Groesbeck in 1929.

Cabrillo shipped for Havana as a young man^{[when?]} and joined forces with Hernán Cortés in Mexico (then called New Spain), after the defeat of Pánfilo de Narváez's troops (which included Cabrilho). Later, his success in mining gold in Guatemala made him one of the richest of the conquistadores in Mexico.

=== Expeditions in the Americas ===
He accompanied Francisco de Orozco to subdue the indigenous Mixtec people at what would eventually become the city of Oaxaca, in Mexico. Little is known of what Cabrillo did there.

In 1539, Francisco de Ulloa, who had been commissioned by Cortés, explored and named the Sea of Cortés (Gulf of California) and reached nearly as far north as the 30th parallel. Cabrillo was then commissioned by the new Viceroy of New Spain, Antonio de Mendoza, to lead an expedition up the Pacific coast in search of trade opportunities, perhaps to find a way to China (for the full extent of the northern Pacific was unknown) or to find the mythical Strait of Anián (or Northwest Passage) connecting the Pacific Ocean with Hudson Bay. Cabrillo built and owned the flagship of his venture (three ships), and stood to profit from any trade or treasure.

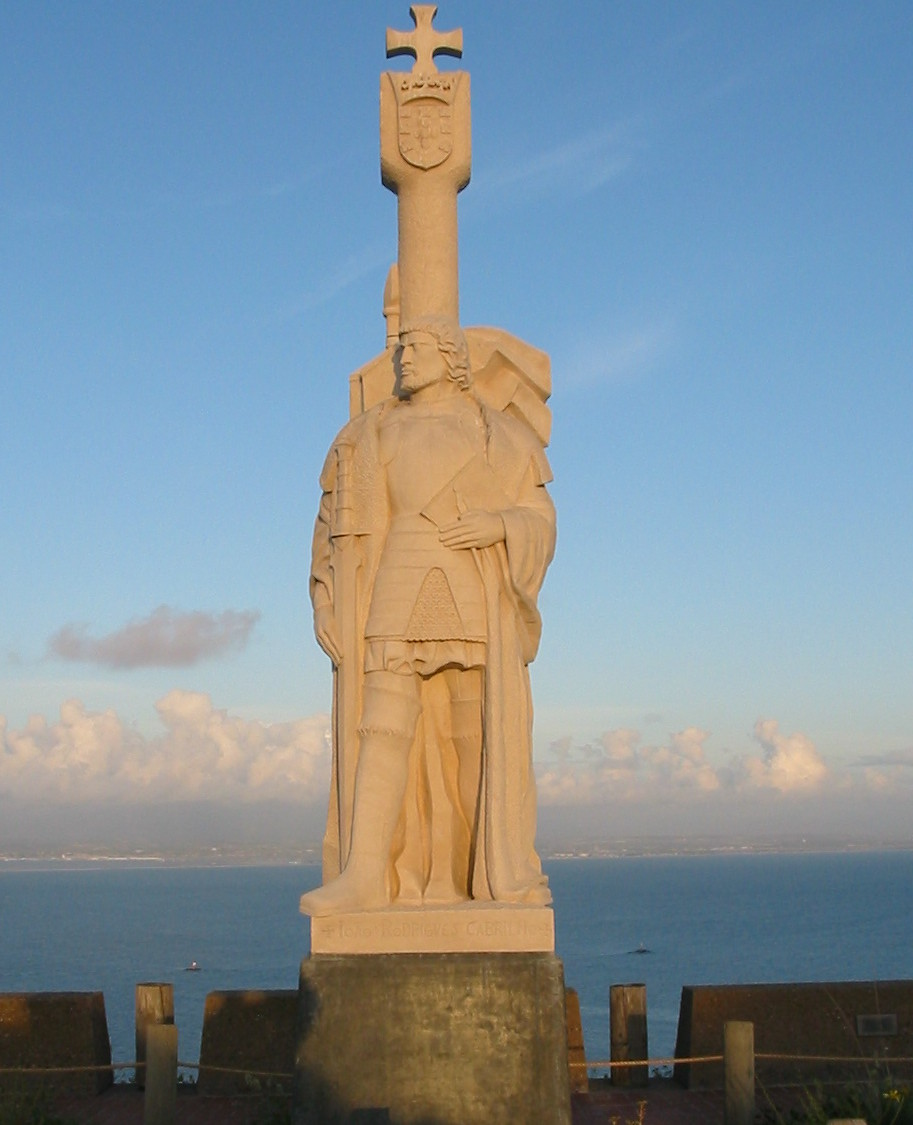
Cabrillo National Monument at Point Loma in San Diego, California. It was donated to the state of California in 1939 by the Portuguese government.

In 1540, the fleet sailed from Acajutla, El Salvador, and reached Navidad, Mexico on Christmas Day. While in Mexico, Pedro de Alvarado went to the assistance of the town of Nochistlán, which was under siege by hostile natives, and was killed when his horse fell on him, crushing his chest. Following Alvarado's death, the viceroy took possession of Alvarado's fleet. Part of the fleet was sent off to the Spanish East Indies under Ruy López de Villalobos and three of the ships were sent north under the command of Cabrillo.

On June 27, 1542, Cabrillo set out from Navidad with three ships: the 200-ton galleon and flagship San Salvador, the smaller La Victoria (c. 100 tons), and the lateen-rigged, twenty-six oared "fragata" or "bergantin" San Miguel. On August 1, Cabrillo anchored within sight of Cedros Island. Before the end of the month they had passed Baja Point (named "Cabo del Engaño" by de Ulloa in 1539) and entered "uncharted waters, where no Spanish ships had been before". On September 28, he landed in what is now San Diego Bay and named it "San Miguel". A little over a week later he reached Santa Catalina Island (October 7), which he named "San Salvador", after his flagship. On sending a boat to the island "a great crowd of armed Indians appeared" – whom, however, they later "befriended". Nearby San Clemente Island was named "Victoria", in honor of the third ship of the fleet. The next morning, October 8, Cabrillo came to San Pedro Bay, which was named "Baya de los Fumos" (English: Smoke Bay). The following day they anchored overnight in Santa Monica Bay. Going up the coast Cabrillo saw Anacapa Island, which they learned from the Indigenous People was uninhabited.

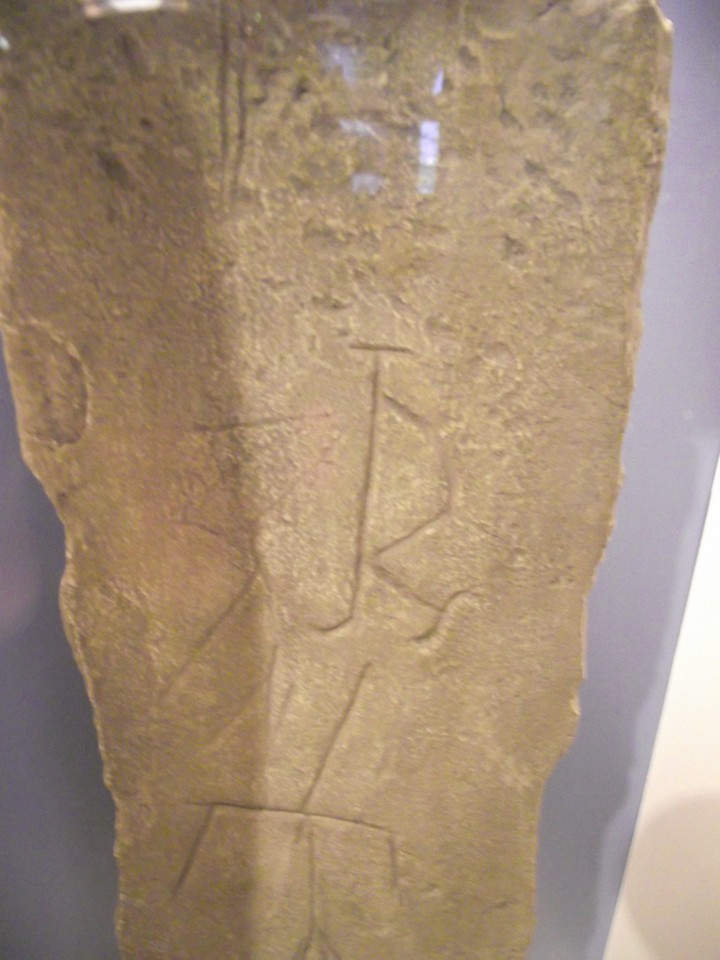
Replica of Cabrillo's tombstone at the Maritime Museum of San Diego.

The fleet spent the next week in the islands, mostly anchored in Cuyler Harbor, a bay on the northeastern coast of San Miguel Island. On October 18 the expedition saw Point Conception, which they named "Cabo de Galera". Cabrillo's expedition recorded the names of numerous Chumash villages on the California coast and adjacent islands in October 1542 – then located in the two warring provinces of Xexo (ruled by an "old woman", now Santa Barbara County, California) and Xucu (now Ventura County, California).

On November 13 they sighted and named "Cabo de Pinos" (possibly either Point Pinos or Point Reyes), but missed the entrance to San Francisco Bay, a lapse that mariners would repeat for the next two centuries and more, most likely because its entrance is frequently shrouded by fog. The expedition may have reached as far north as the Russian River or even the Columbia before autumn storms forced them to turn back. Because of the vagueness of his description, it is uncertain which northern river the expedition sighted. Coming back down the coast, Cabrillo entered Monterey Bay, naming it "Bahia de Los Pinos".

On November 23, 1542, the little fleet arrived back in "San Salvador" (Santa Catalina Island) to overwinter and make repairs. There, around Christmas Eve, Cabrillo stepped out of his boat and splintered his shin when he stumbled onto a jagged rock while trying to rescue some of his men from attacking Tongva warriors. The injury became infected and developed gangrene, and he died on January 3, 1543, and was buried. A possible headstone was later found on San Miguel Island. His second-in-command brought the remainder of the party back to Navidad, where they arrived April 14, 1543.

A notary's official report of Cabrillo's expedition was lost; all that survives is a summary of it made by another investigator, Andrés de Urdaneta, who also had access to ships' logs and charts. No printed account of Cabrillo's voyage appeared before historian Antonio de Herrera's account early in the 17th century.

== Marriages and offspring ==
According to his biographer Harry Kelsey, he took an indigenous woman as his common-law wife and sired several children, including at least three daughters.

Later he married Beatriz Sanchez de Ortega in Seville during a hiatus in Spain. She returned to Guatemala with him and bore him two sons. Those two sons were named Juan Rodríguez Cabrillo de Medrano, his heir, and the younger Diego Sanchez de Ortega (the latter, named after his maternal uncle).

=== Juan Rodríguez Cabrillo de Medrano ===
His namesake son and heir, Juan Rodríguez Cabrillo de Medrano, was born in Guatemala in the year 1536 and died in 1592, Lima, Peru. According to Kelsey, the "de Medrano" part of his name was only added later by himself, not by baptism, however, all his descendants carried the surname, and Kelsey's research and biography of Cabrillo has been extensively criticized by Martin Torodash from Duke University in the Hispanic American Historical Review (1987).

Cabrillo's heir Juan Rodríguez Cabrillo de Medrano was the encomendero of Xicalpa, Jocopila and Comitlán, and twice town magistrate of Santiago de Guatemala and owner of a cattle ranch along the road connecting Xicalapa to Miahuatlán. In February 1579 he helped Francisco Díaz Del Castillo as a witness to his testimony. Medrano served as an active magistrate of the Santiago de Guatemala Cabildo in 1577. He was also involved in a well-known dispute over the encomienda of Cobán.

Juan Rodríguez Cabrillo de Medrano married with Isabel de Aldana and had two sons, the older son and heir named Alonso Rodríguez Cabrillo de Medrano, who inherited his father's encomiendas, and the younger Geronimo Cabrillo de Aldana, father of Esteban de Medrano y Solórzano.

The younger Geronimo Cabrillo de Aldana inherited the family encomiendas after the death of his older brother Alonso Rodríguez Cabrillo de Medrano. Geronimo's son and heir Esteban de Medrano y Solórzano wrote his will in 1688 as the legitimate son of Geronimo Cabrillo de Aldana; the grandson of Juan Rodríguez Cabrillo de Medrano; and great-grandson of Juan Rodríguez Cabrillo. On 24 May 1670, Esteban de Medrano y Solórzano was recorded as the chancellor and regidor of the Audiencia y Cancillería Real de Santiago de Guatemala.

== Namesakes and commemorations ==
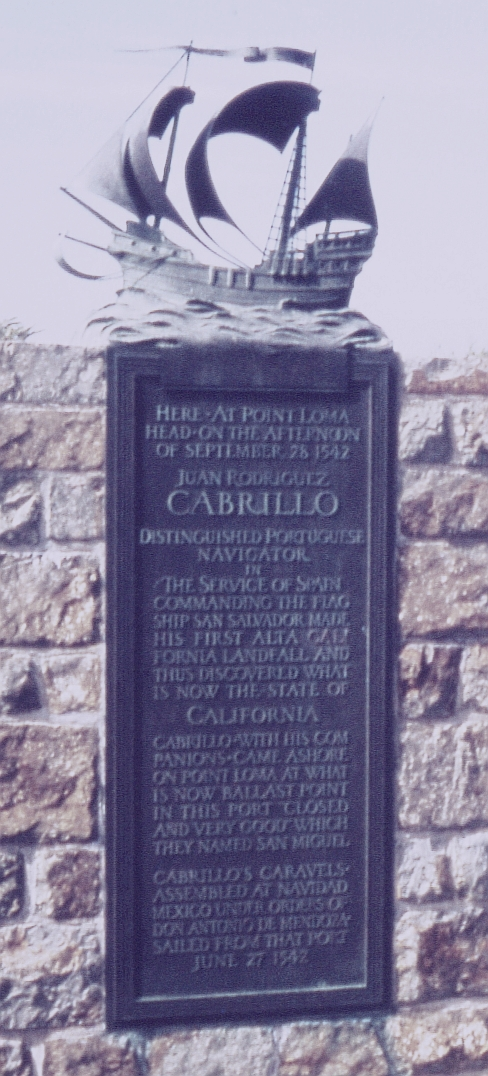
Plaque placed at Cabrillo National Monument in 1935 by João António de Bianchi, Ambassador of Portugal to the United States.

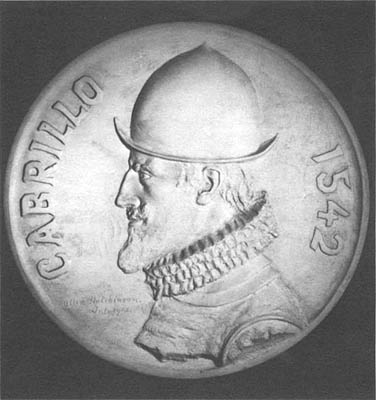
Medallion of Cabrillo by Allen Hutchinson, 1902.

His discoveries went largely unnoticed at the time, so none of his place names were permanently adopted. Despite this, Cabrillo is now remembered as the first European to travel the California coast, and many parks, schools, buildings and streets in California bear his name.

Most notably, the National Park Service operates Cabrillo National Monument, overlooking the bay and ocean from Point Loma in San Diego, commemorating his first landing in California and offering views of San Diego and the Pacific Ocean. The monument features a larger-than-life statue of Cabrillo, donated by the government of Portugal, as well as a plaque honoring him donated in 1935 by the Portuguese ambassador to the United States. A museum in the park focuses on Cabrillo and his voyages of discovery. Every September Cabrillo Festival Inc. hosts the Cabrillo Festival, an annual three-day celebration of his discovery of San Diego Bay, including a re-enactment of his landing at Ballast Point.

Another Cabrillo Monument is located on San Miguel Island.

In the state of California, September 28th is officially "Cabrillo Day".

A civic organization of Portuguese-Americans primarily in California is called the Cabrillo Club.

In northern California, the Point Cabrillo Light is named after him. San Pedro, part of the city of Los Angeles, has Cabrillo Beach and the Cabrillo Marine Aquarium.

Schools named for him include Cabrillo College in Aptos, California, high schools in Lompoc and Long Beach, and several middle and elementary schools.

The portion of California State Route 1 that runs from Las Cruces in Santa Barbara County north to San Francisco is called the Cabrillo Highway. The Cabrillo Bridge and Cabrillo Freeway (California State Route 163) running through San Diego's Balboa Park are also named for him. There are streets named for him in many cities in California.

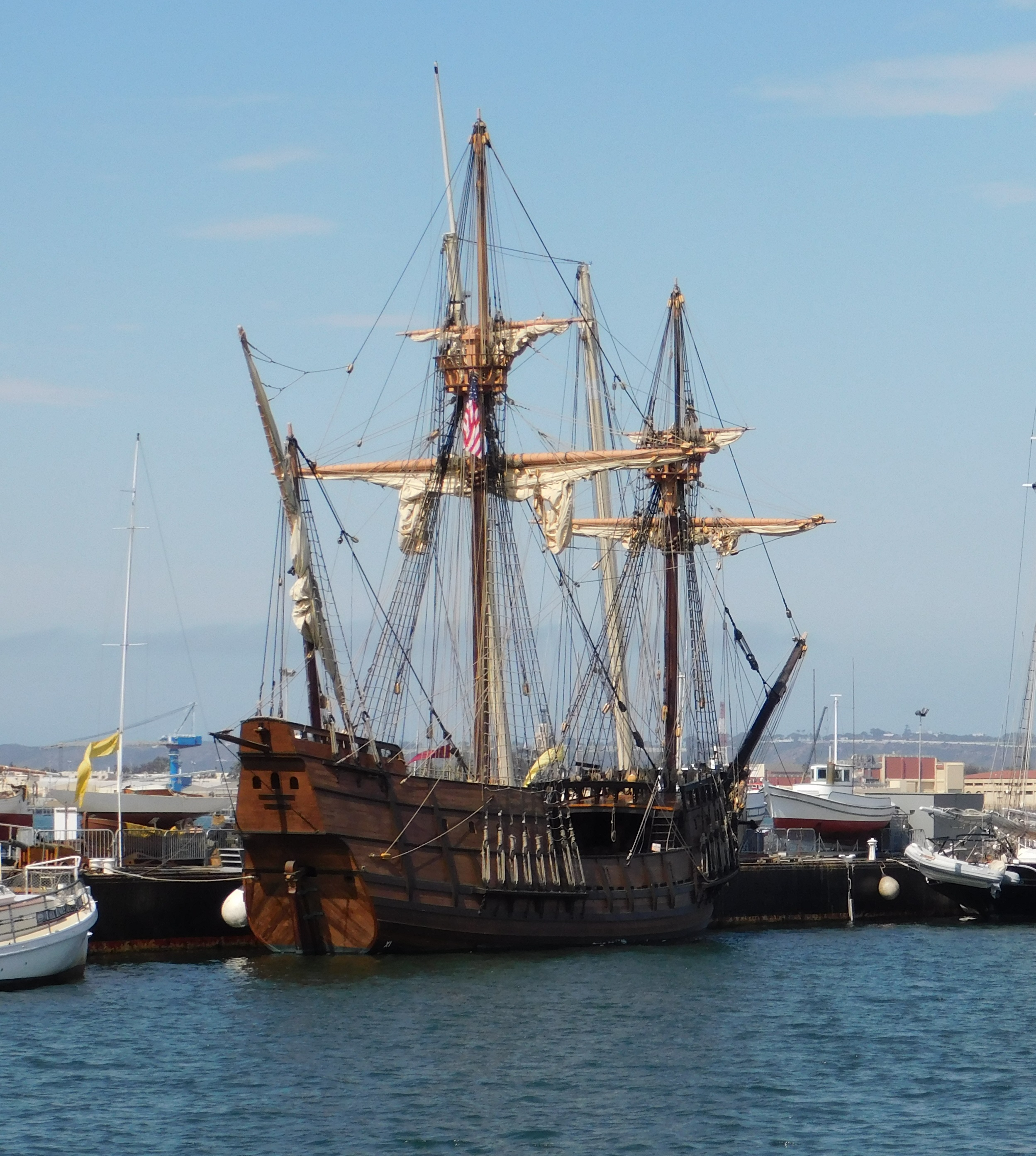
Replica of the San Salvador, Cabrillo's flagship.

The SS Cabrillo was a wooden steamer launched in 1914 to serve as a ferry across the San Pedro Channel to Santa Catalina Island. It was later requisitioned by the United States Army and served as a troop transport in northern California during World War II.

In 1992, the United States Postal Service issued a 29¢ stamp in honor of Cabrillo.

The Flag of San Diego features the number 1542 to represent Cabrillo's "discovery" of San Diego Bay in that year.

Rodriguez Seamount in the Pacific Ocean is named for him.

=== San Salvador replica ===
The Maritime Museum of San Diego, in partnership with Cabrillo National Monument, has built a full-sized, fully functional, and historically accurate replica of Juan Rodriquez Cabrillo's flagship, San Salvador. The construction of the replica was based on historical and archeological research into early Spanish and Portuguese shipbuilding techniques.

The construction was carried out in full public view on the shores of San Diego Bay by professional boat builders, assisted by scores of volunteers. Her keel was laid in April 2011; her first official public unveiling was in September 2015 when she led a parade of tall ships. The replica ship now sails on regular tours in the waters of the Southern California coast as an educational historical resource.

=== Accusations of genocide and efforts to change namesake ===
Proponents to change the name for Cabrillo College say Cabrillo left a legacy of indigenous exploitation. A faculty-led resolution delivered to Cabrillo College President Matt Wetstein accused Juan Rodriguez Cabrillo of enslaving indigenous people and profiting from the genocide and exploitation of the indigenous, including through a gold mine the resolution states he owned and operated in Guatemala.

Another effort was suggested to rename Cabrillo High School in Lompoc for similar reasons.
