= Thomas Cummings Gibson =

British shipbuilder and industrialist

- Born: 1 April 1800; Gateshead, County Durham, England
- Died: 22 December 1870 (aged 70); Beach House, Hammersmith, Middlesex, England
- Occupations: Coal owner, merchant, shipowner, shipbuilder
- Known for: Ramsey Shipyard; Euterpe (later Star of India)
- Spouse: Jane Gibson (m. 1826; died 1835)

Thomas Cummings Gibson (1 April 1800 – 22 December 1870) was a British coal owner, merchant, shipowner and shipbuilder. After a career in the north-east of England coal trade and in shipping, he bought the old shipyard at Ramsey, Isle of Man, in 1854 and developed it into the largest shipbuilding concern in the town, with a patent slip, workers' housing, chemical works and oil-refining plant. The yard's best-known vessel is the iron full-rigged ship Euterpe, launched in 1863 and later renamed Star of India, now preserved at the Maritime Museum of San Diego as a United States National Historic Landmark.

In 1862 Gibson filed British patent applications for ships and apparatus to carry and store petroleum in bulk, and in 1863 his Ramsey works received crude Pennsylvanian oil by tank vessel for refining and sale through Liverpool. The venture was not commercially successful; Gibson passed through bankruptcy proceedings in 1866 and died at Hammersmith in 1870.

== Early life and family ==
Gibson was born at Gateshead, County Durham, on 1 April 1800, the son of John Gibson and Mary Cummings. On 21 September 1826 he married Jane Gibson of Newcastle upon Tyne. Their daughter Susanna was born in 1827, and Jane Gibson died in 1835.

== Coal and shipping interests ==
During the 1830s and 1840s Gibson owned or held shares in merchant vessels built on the Tyne and at Hartlepool, and by 1849 he was a merchant of Gracechurch Street, London, and a shareholder in the West Hartlepool Shipping Company. He was also involved in County Durham coal mining: he signed the formation deeds of the North Durham Coal Company in 1841 and later acted as trustee of its heavily mortgaged colliery interests at Sacriston, Farnacres and Trimdon, and in 1855 he took a one-third share in the partnership controlling Trimdon Colliery in settlement of a debt.

== Ramsey Shipyard ==
Gibson settled at Ramsey around 1854. He later recalled that he had returned to the town after a long absence to recover his health and to dispose of a property he owned there, and that a former shipyard worker had persuaded him to build a patent slip, which he took forward after inspecting the slips then working on the Cumberland coast. He bought the old shipyard at North Ramsey that year and appointed the architect John Spencer Raby as his agent. Within eighteen months the site had a seawall, quay walls, a 350-foot patent slip and twelve workers' flats on Gibson Street, now Templar Terrace, and the slip was reported as capable of taking vessels of 600 to 800 tons for repair. The slip was at first let to a shipbuilder named Patterson, and in January 1857 Gibson was honoured with a public dinner by the gentry, clergy and tradesmen of the town.

By the early 1860s the yard was operated by the firm of Gibson, McDonald & Arnold. Thwaites' directory of 1863 recorded upwards of 250 men employed at the establishment, which could build wooden or iron ships of up to 2,000 tons; alongside the shipyard were chemical works, vitriol chambers and mineral oil distilleries, and Gibson had recently completed a Workmen's Hall for his employees. Gibson and his family lived first at the end of the workers' terrace and later at Orry's Mount in Bride.

In 1862 a group of Ramsey women promoted a charitable industrial school for the town's destitute children. Gibson organised the purchase of a site on North Shore Road and the erection of its building, and his daughter Susanna took charge of the charity when the school opened in July 1863. The institution later developed into the Ramsey Children's Home at Ballacloan, which Susanna Gibson handed over to the Methodist children's charity of Thomas Bowman Stephenson in 1880. Gibson also lent part of the shipyard buildings for Methodist services. He and his family left Ramsey in the summer of 1864.

== Ships built at Ramsey ==
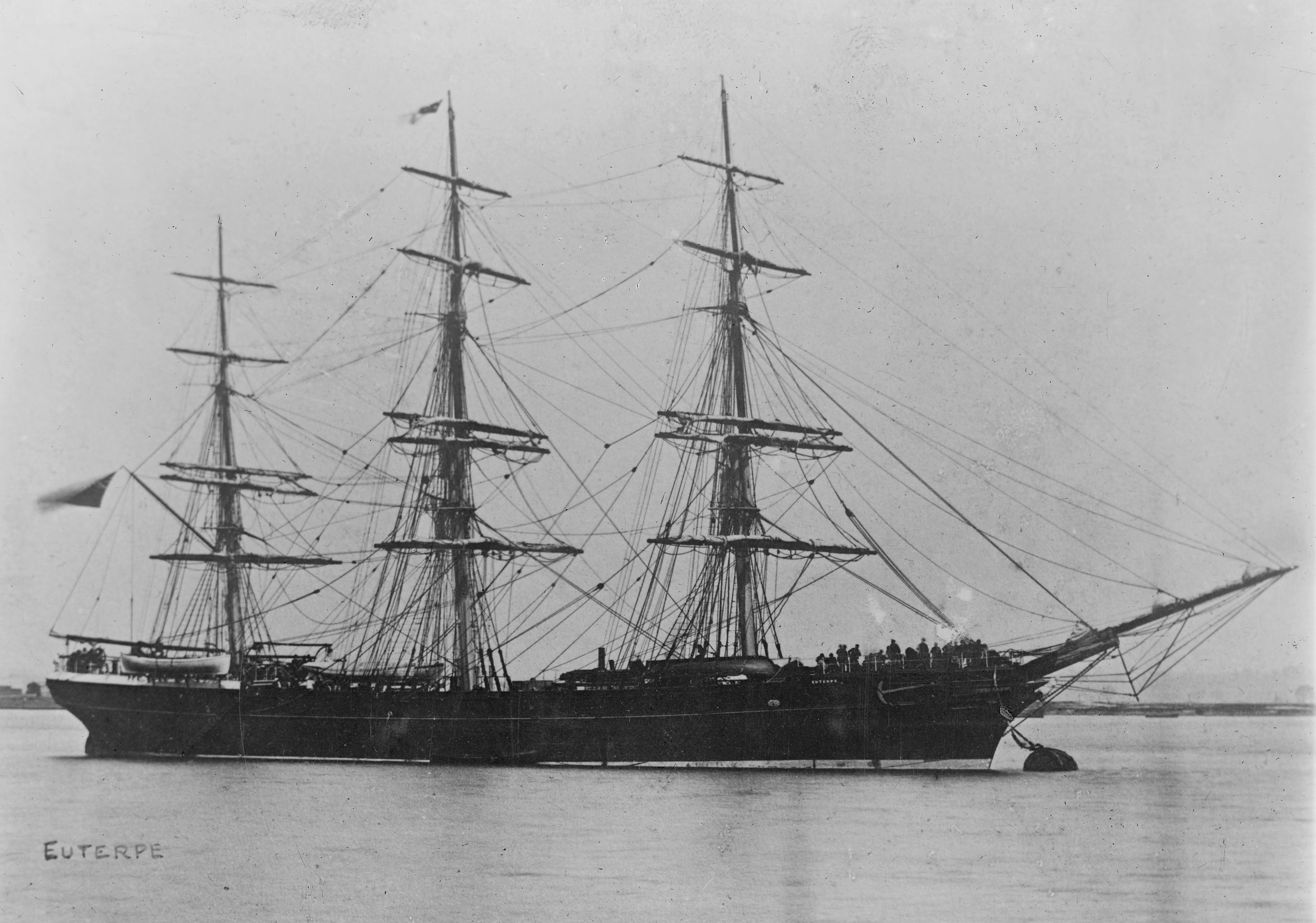
The iron ship Euterpe, later Star of India, built at Ramsey in 1863 by Gibson, McDonald & Arnold

Euterpe was launched at Ramsey on 14 November 1863 by Gibson, McDonald & Arnold for Wakefield, Nash & Company of Liverpool, an iron full-rigged ship of 1,246 tons register intended for the India trade. She later carried emigrants to New Zealand, was renamed Star of India in 1906, and is preserved by the Maritime Museum of San Diego. The yard also built Ramsey, one of three iron sailing oil carriers constructed in 1863 under Lloyd's Register class A1 special survey, and was associated with Jane, a tank-fitted vessel acquired by the Liverpool and Ramsey Oil Refining and Chemical Works Company, which brought crude Pennsylvanian oil from Philadelphia to Ramsey.

== Petroleum refining and the bulk-oil trade ==
In July 1862 Gibson applied for provisional patent protection for ships designed to carry and warehouse petroleum and other inflammable fluids, and in December 1862 he and Frederick Daniel Delf of Liverpool applied jointly for apparatus for the safe carriage and storage of oil.

By 1863 Gibson was operating oil-refining and chemical works at North Ramsey. The Liverpool and Ramsey Oil Refining and Chemical Works Company, Limited, was formed that year, with Gibson as chairman, to carry on the business on a larger scale; it acquired his land, plant, floating storage tanks and the Jane in exchange for shares. The business involved buying crude oil in America, carrying it to Ramsey in tank vessels, and refining it for sale through Liverpool and other markets.

The oil-carrier venture did not succeed. Lloyd's Register Foundation records that none of the three iron sailing oil carriers of 1863, including Ramsey, was used for its intended purpose, and successful bulk carriage of oil by sea was only achieved later in the century.

== Financial collapse and later life ==
By the mid-1860s Gibson was based in Liverpool. In April 1866 his case came before the Liverpool Bankruptcy Court, where his accounts showed substantial debts, most of them secured, and little property outside his creditors' hands; his solicitor told the court that a settlement with the creditors was being completed. The adjudication was annulled the following month, when he was listed as a shipbuilder and merchant in the Edinburgh Gazette.

Gibson died at Beach House, Hammersmith, Middlesex, on 22 December 1870. Probate was granted in 1873 to his son Thomas George Gibson of Newcastle upon Tyne, with effects sworn at under £100.

== Legacy ==
Gibson's yard is chiefly remembered for building Euterpe, and Gibson Street, now Templar Terrace, survives as part of the workers' housing he built. A 1937 retrospective in the Isle of Man Examiner described Euterpe as the finest product of the yard, recalling that she had been called "the Cutty Sark of Manxland", and in 1952 the Ramsey Courier recalled Gibson and the yard's history in a feature based on a talk by the local historian G. E. Quayle. In 2019 Gibson was included in an Isle of Man Post Office stamp issue commemorating Victorian engineers and inventors connected with the island.

== See also ==
- History of the oil tanker
