= USS Dolphin (AGSS-555) =

Submarine of the United States

Coordinates: 32.721084°N 117.173764°W

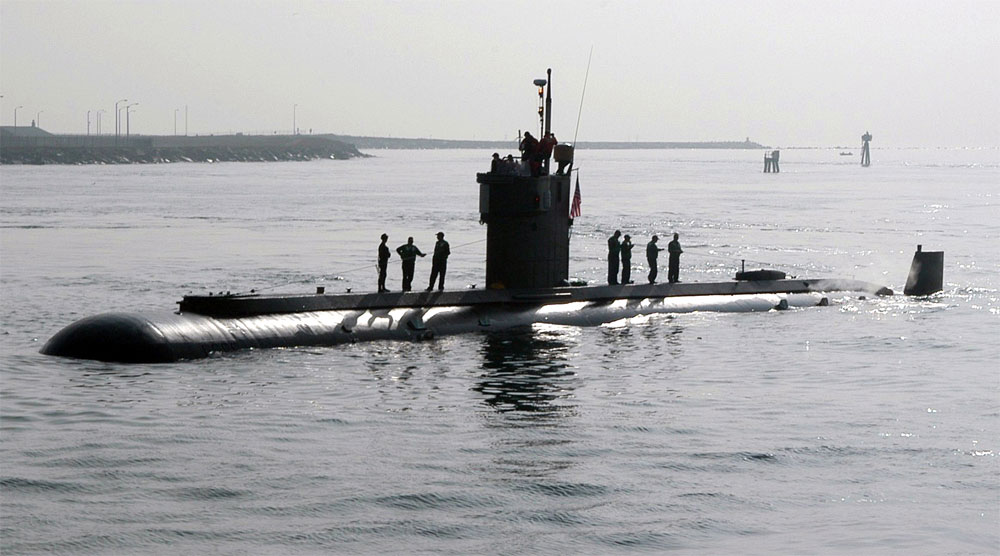
- USS Dolphin

History

United States
- Namesake: Dolphin
- Ordered: 10 August 1960
- Builder: Portsmouth Naval Shipyard
- Laid down: 9 November 1962
- Launched: 8 June 1968
- Sponsored by: Mrs. Maggie Shinobu Inouye
- Commissioned: 17 August 1968
- Decommissioned: 15 January 2007
- Out of service: 22 September 2006
- Stricken: 15 January 2007
- Status: Museum ship at the Maritime Museum of San Diego
- Badge

General characteristics
- Class & type: Dolphin-class submarine
- Displacement: 805 long tons (818 t) light; 861 long tons (875 t) full load; 56 long tons (57 t) dead
- Length: 46.3 m (151 ft 11 in)
- Beam: 6 m (19 ft 8 in)
- Draft: 4.8 m (15 ft 9 in)
- Propulsion: 2 × General Motors/Detroit Diesel V71 12-cylinder diesel engines, 425 hp (317 kW); 2 × electric main motors; 330-cell silver-oxide battery
- Speed: 10 knots (19 km/h; 12 mph) surfaced; 7.5 knots (13.9 km/h; 8.6 mph) submerged; (10 knots (19 km/h; 12 mph), 3–4 knots (5.6–7.4 km/h; 3.5–4.6 mph) sustained
- Endurance: 15 days
- Test depth: 3,000 ft (910 m) (unclassified)
- Capacity: 12 tons on external mounting pads, six port, six starboard, forward and aft of sail
- Complement: 3 officers, 20 ratings, 4 scientists
- Armament: Small arms. No internal torpedo tubes. An external tube could be mounted to be used for experiments.
- Notes: fitted with a 20-ton keel section to be jettisoned by explosive bolts for surfacing under emergency conditions

USS Dolphin (AGSS-555) was a United States Navy diesel-electric deep-diving research and development submarine. She was commissioned in 1968 and decommissioned in 2007. Her 38-year career was the longest in history for a US Navy submarine to that point. She was the Navy's last operational conventionally powered submarine.

== Construction and service ==
Dolphin was designed under project SCB 207. Her keel was laid on 9 November 1962 at the Portsmouth Navy Yard, Kittery, Maine. She was launched on 8 June 1968, sponsored by Mrs. Maggie Shinobu Inouye, (née Awamura), wife of U.S. Senator Daniel K. Inouye, and commissioned on 17 August 1968 with Lieutenant Commander J.R. McDonnell in command.

Dolphin's hull number, "555", is unusual in that it was taken out of sequence. At the time of her 1968 commissioning, the five other new submarines commissioned that year, all of the Sturgeon class, had hull numbers ranging from 638 to 663. Dolphin's hull number was taken from a block of cancelled hull numbers from the World War II-vintage Tench class, the last of which was commissioned in 1951. The reason for the selection of "555" as Dolphin's hull number is not known.

Despite a recent repair and upgrade, Dolphin was decommissioned on 15 January 2007 and stricken from the Naval Vessel Register on the same date. She is now a museum ship in San Diego Bay under the management of the San Diego Maritime Museum.

== Design ==
The single most significant technical achievement in the development of Dolphin is the pressure hull itself. It is a constant-diameter cylinder, closed at its ends with hemispherical heads, and uses deep frames instead of bulkheads. The entire design of the pressure hull was kept as simple as possible to facilitate its use in structural experiments and trials. Hull openings were minimized for structural strength and minimum hull weight, in addition to eliminating possible sources for flooding casualties. The submarine has no snorkel mast; the main hatch had to be open when the diesel engines were running.

== Use ==
Employed in both civilian and Navy activities, Dolphin was equipped with an extensive instrumentation suite that supported missions such as acoustic deep-water and littoral research, near-bottom and ocean surveys, weapons launches, sensor trials, and engineering evaluations. Because she was designed as a test platform, Dolphin could be modified both internally and externally to allow installation of up to 12 tons of special research and test equipment. She has internal and external mounting points, multiple electronic hull connectors, and up to 10 equipment racks for project use.

== Service record ==
In August 1969, Dolphin launched a torpedo from the deepest depth that one has ever been fired. Other examples of Dolphin's work include:

- first successful submarine-to-aircraft optical communications
- development of a laser imaging system of photographic clarity
- development of an extreme low frequency antenna for Ohio-class submarines
- evaluation of various nonacoustic ASW techniques
- evaluation of various low probability of interception active sonars
- first submarine launch of a mobile submarine simulator system
- first successful submarine test of BQS-15 sonar system
- development of highly accurate (10 cm) towed body position monitoring system
- development of a new obstacle-avoidance sonar system
- development of a highly accurate target management system
- evaluation of a possible "fifth force of nature"
- first successful submarine-to-aircraft two-way laser communication
- deepest submarine (i.e. non-submersible) dive; more than 3,000 feet (910 m)

Dolphin was overhauled in 1993. In the late 1990s, Dolphin tested a new sonar system. As a result of Dolphin's efforts, this new system will now be retrofitted into the fleet.

=== Fire and evacuation at sea ===
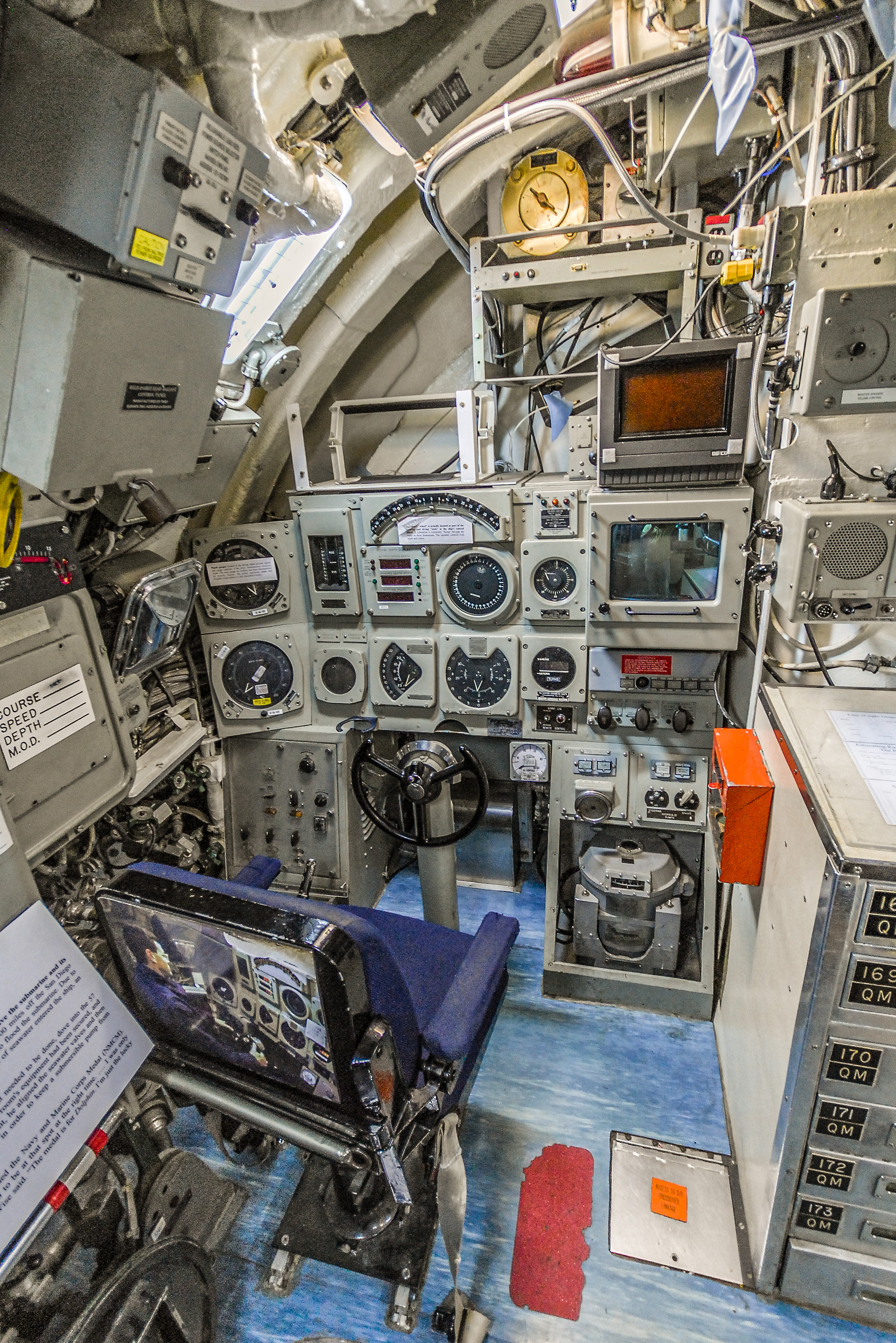
USS Dolphin (AGSS-555) diving plane control station

On 21 May 2002, around 23:30 PDT, while operating roughly 100 miles (160 km) off the coast of San Diego, California, Dolphin was cruising on the surface, recharging her batteries, when a torpedo shield door gasket failed, and the boat began to flood. Due to high winds and 10-to-11-foot (3.0 to 3.4 m) swells in the ocean, around 75 tons of seawater entered the ship, an amount perilously close to the boat's reserve buoyancy. The flooding shorted electrical panels and started fires.

Chief Machinist's Mate (SS) John D. Wise, Jr., dove into the 57 °F (14 °C) water of the flooded pump room. With less than a foot of breathable space in the compartment, he ensured the seawater valves were lined up, allowing pumping out to commence. Once the valves were aligned, he remained in the pump room for more than 90 minutes to keep a submersible pump from becoming clogged. His courageous efforts prevented the loss of the ship and crew. Wise received the Navy and Marine Corps Medal for his efforts.

After 90 minutes, with fire and flooding beyond the ability of the crew to control, Commander Stephen Kelety, Dolphin's commanding officer, ordered the crew of 41 and two civilian Navy employees to abandon ship. The Oceanographic Research ship William McGaw was operating in the vicinity, and immediately responded to Kelety's call for assistance. They were evacuated by boat to William McGaw after the hatches had been secured. All crewmembers were safely recovered with only a few minor injuries. Two were recovered from the water by United States Coast Guard helicopter during the transfer. William McGaw transported the crew to San Diego. USS Thach also came alongside Dolphin and rescued several crewman from the water, but the seas were too rough for full recovery or towing operations.

The quick response of the crew placed the submarine in a stable condition. Submarine Support Vessel Kellie Chouest got underway from San Diego early on 22 May to assist in recovery. Dolphin was towed back to San Diego the following day.

== Retirement ==
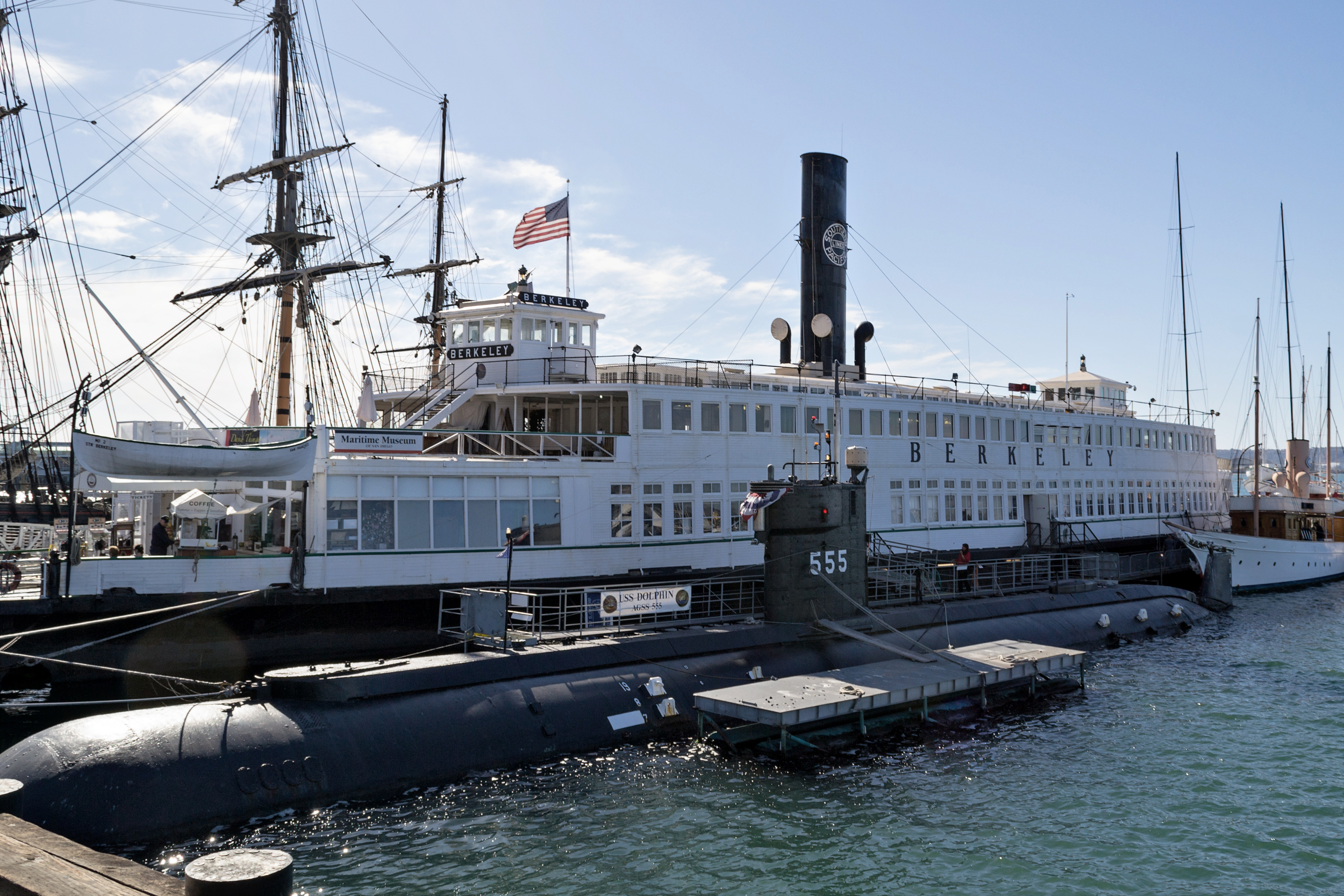
Dolphin berthed next to Berkeley at the San Diego Maritime Museum

Dolphin underwent three and a half years of repairs and upgrades at a cost of $50 million, then completed sea trials during the summer of 2005, and returned to her duties for one year.

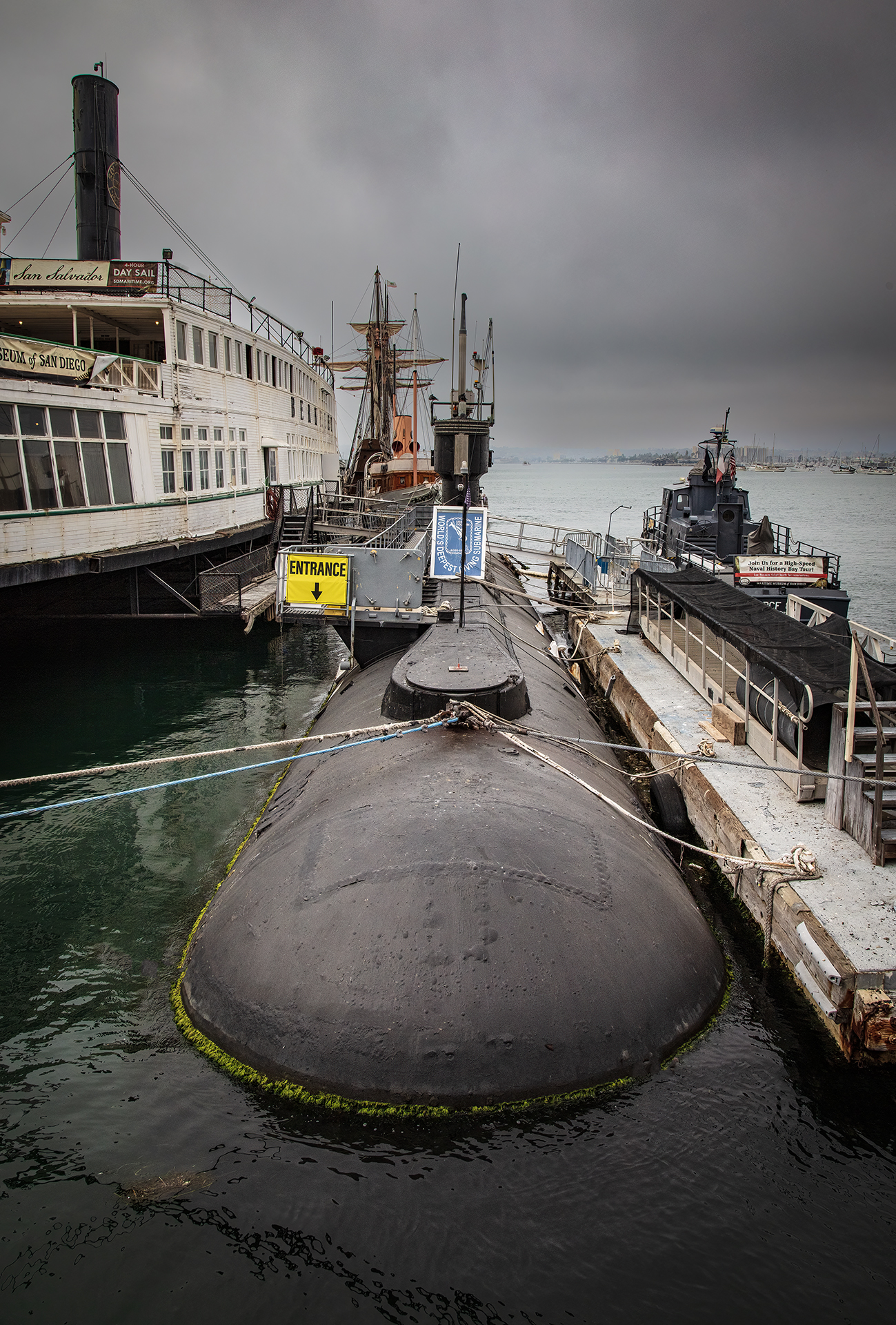
USS Dolphin, October 2024

In mid-2006, the Navy decided to retire Dolphin, citing the $18 million her operations cost annually. She was deactivated on 22 September 2006, and decommissioned and struck from the Naval Vessel Register on 15 January 2007. Dolphin was officially transferred to the San Diego Maritime Museum in September 2008, to become the eighth vessel in their floating collection. She was opened to the public for the first time on 4 July 2009.

== Awards ==
- National Defense Service Medal with two stars
- Global War on Terrorism Service Medal

== See also ==
- Major submarine incidents since 2000
- NR-1
- USS Albacore (AGSS-569)
