= Berkeley (ferryboat) =

San Francisco Bay ferry

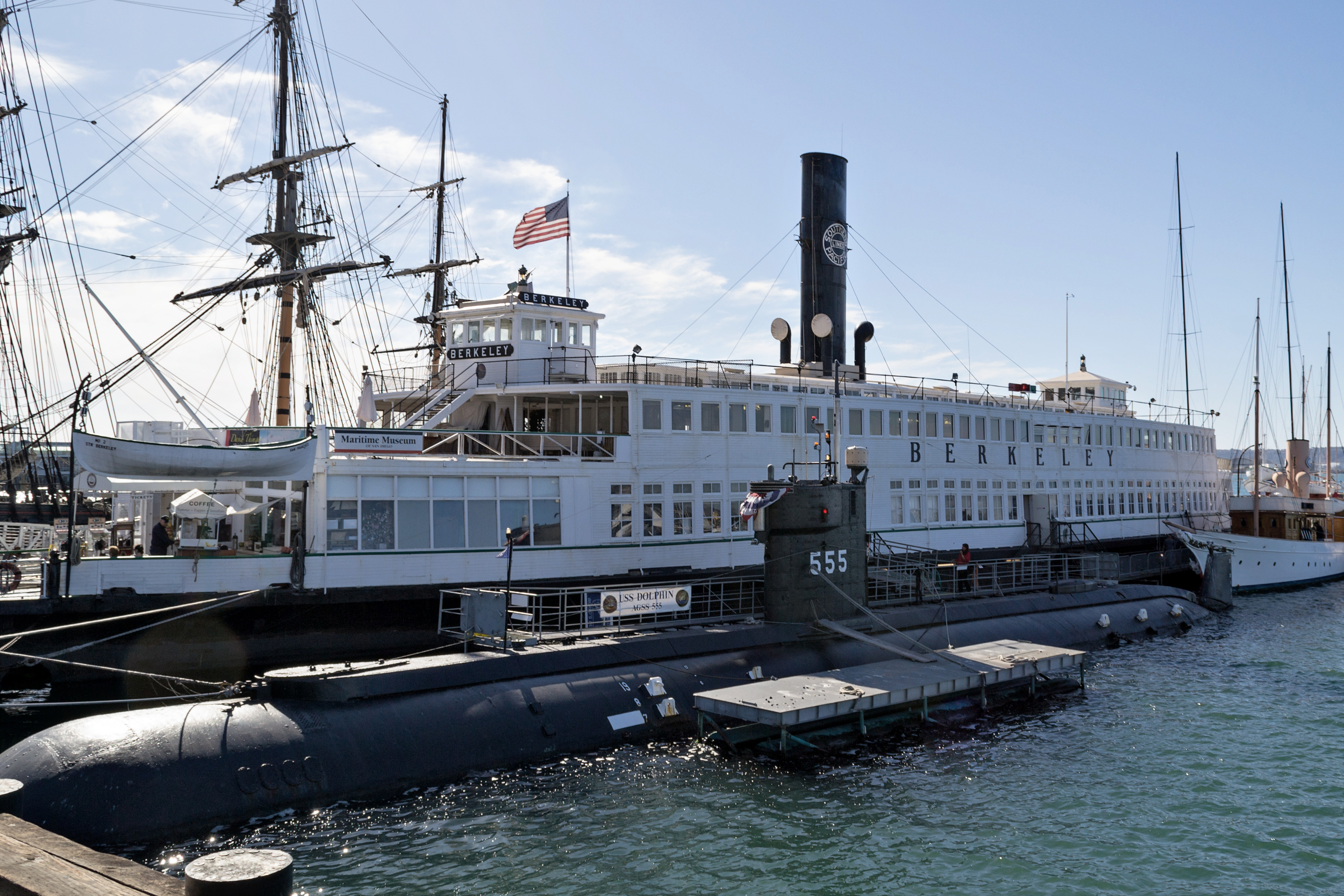
- Berkeley ferryboat and USS Dolphin at the Maritime Museum of San Diego

History

United States
- Name: Berkeley
- Owner: Southern Pacific Railroad
- Builder: Union Iron Works
- Launched: 18 October 1898
- In service: 1898
- Out of service: 1958
- Status: Museum ship

General characteristics
- Tonnage: 1883
- Length: 279 ft (85 m)
- Beam: 64 ft (20 m)
- Draft: 9 ft (2.7 m)
- Installed power: triple-expansion steam engine 1,450 hp (1,080 kW)
- Berkeley
- U.S. National Register of Historic Places
- U.S. National Historic Landmark
- California Historical Landmark
- Location within California
- Location: San Diego, California
- Coordinates: 32.72095°N 117.17395°W
- Built: 1898
- Architect: Union Iron Works
- NRHP reference No.: 90002220
- CHISL No.: 1031

Significant dates
- Added to NRHP: December 14, 1990
- Designated NHL: December 14, 1990

Berkeley was one of several ferryboats of the Southern Pacific Railroad that for sixty years operated on San Francisco Bay between the Oakland Pier and the San Francisco Ferry Building. Built in 1898 by the Union Iron Works of San Francisco, she served after the 1906 earthquake, ferrying refugees across the bay to Oakland.

== History ==
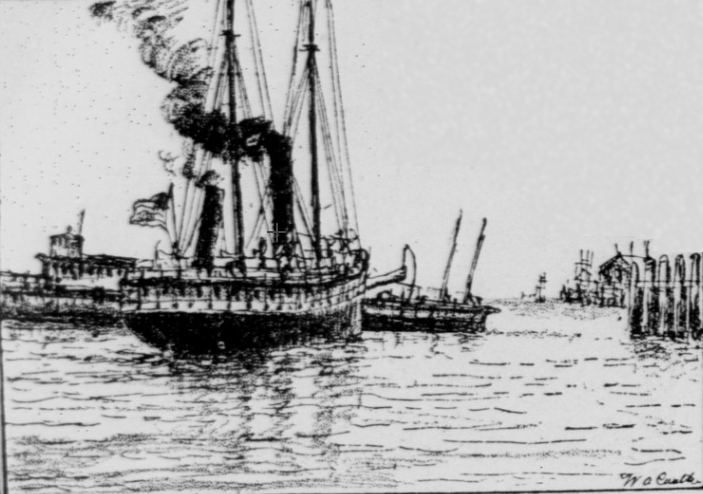
The collision between Berkeley and the passenger liner SS Columbia on October 3, 1900.

Berkeley was in regular service beginning in 1898. On October 3, 1900, Berkeley was leaving her dock in San Francisco, when she collided with the coastal passenger liner SS Columbia. Due to a misunderstanding of signals, Captain Blaker of Berkeley thought that his ship would be able to pass in front of Columbia while the larger liner was travelling forward at a slow speed towards her dock. When the realization came that Berkeley would not be able to overcome the massive Columbia, it was too late. Despite both ships reversing thrust, the two ships collided. The collision resulted in the destruction of one lifeboat onboard Berkeley and badly injured Columbia's iron bow. The ferryboat Newark took over for Berkeley, while the latter ship was undergoing repairs. The damage caused to Berkeley was less severe than the damage given to Columbia.

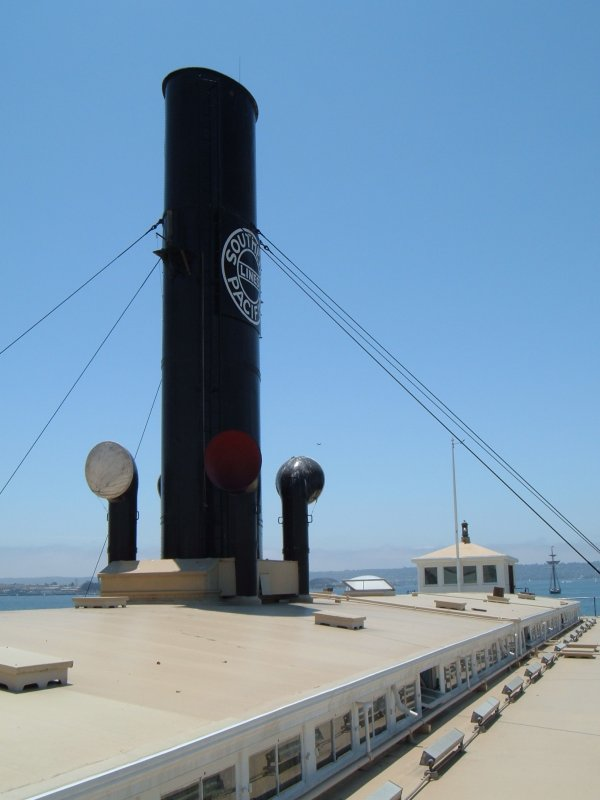
Berkeley's stack

In the spring of 1958, she was taken out of service for repairs. She never returned to service, as Southern Pacific decided to end all ferry service on July 29, 1958. Berkeley was put up for sale, and was purchased by the Golden Gate Fishing Company to be used as a whaling processing facility. Before she was put to this use, however, she was sold to ferryboat enthusiast and businessman Bill Conover. Conover had Berkeley docked in Sausalito, a small town on the Bay in Marin County, and converted her into a gift shop called "Trade Fair". However, Berkeley was not well-maintained in her gift shop incarnation and 12 years of serious deterioration took a toll. In 1973, she was sold to the Maritime Museum of San Diego. She was towed out of San Francisco Bay by tug on May 31, 1973, arriving 3 days later in San Diego where she was subsequently restored. She currently serves as the main "building" of the Maritime Museum of San Diego.

Berkeley was notable for having been the first propeller-driven ferry on the west coast. At the time of her launching on October 18, 1898, she became the largest commuter ferryboat in the United States with a 1700-passenger capacity. She was also remarkable for being one of the earliest ferries to be powered by a triple-expansion steam engine.

Berkeley was declared a National Historic Landmark in 1990 and California State Historical Landmark No. 1031 in 2000.

During the time she was docked in Sausalito, actor Sterling Hayden rented one of Berkeley's pilot houses as an office while he wrote his autobiography Wanderer (published in 1963).

While Berkeley was under construction in 1898, the battleship USS Wisconsin (BB-9) was being constructed adjacent to her.

On the evening of April 15, 1899, Berkeley may have carried the Stanford Axe from the San Francisco Ferry Building to Oakland after it was stolen by a group of University of California students following a baseball game against Stanford.

== Current Condition ==
The boilers for the steam engine are no longer operable. One is cutaway so that visitors can see inside it.

Below deck, much of the original machinery is still semi-operational. Compressed air, rather than steam, is used to power the machinery so that visitors may see them in operation.

The aft of the Berkeley contains two workshops: woodworking is done on the main deck and a room for mixing and storing paint is below it.

== See also ==
- Ferries of San Francisco Bay
