= Californian (schooner) =

1984 replica schooner

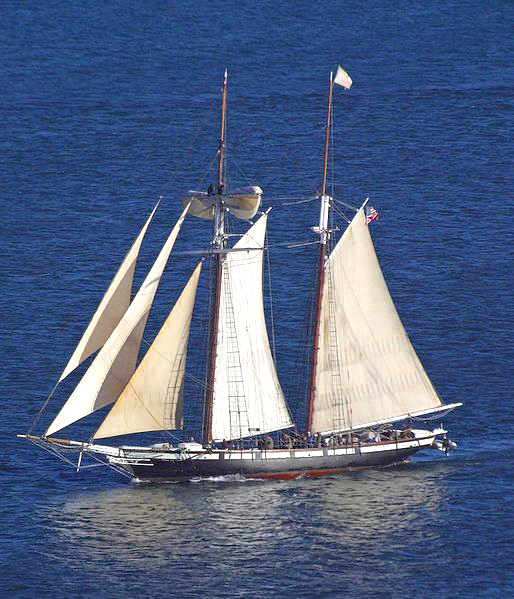
- The Californian

History

United States
- Name: Californian
- Owner: Maritime Museum of San Diego
- Builder: Melbourne Smith, designer; Jayford Hazell/Nautical Heritage Society, builder
- Launched: 1984
- Home port: San Diego, California
- Identification: MMSI number: 366877880; Callsign: WDB2619

General characteristics
- Type: Topsail schooner
- Tonnage: 130 GT
- Length: 93 ft 6 in (28.50 m) on deck; 145 ft (44 m) sparred length
- Beam: 24 ft (7.3 m)
- Draft: 9 ft 6 in (2.90 m)
- Notes: 7,000 sq ft (700 m^{2}) sail area; wood hull

Californian is a 1984 replica of the United States Revenue Marine cutter Lawrence, which operated off the coast of California in the 1850s. (Note: USRC Lawrence was sometimes referred to as USRC C.W. Lawrence; the source of her name is unclear. C.W. Lawrence was possibly Cornelius W. Lawrence, once the Collector of Customs of the Port Of New York) On July 23, 2003, Governor Arnold Schwarzenegger signed Bill No. 965, making her the "official state tall ship" of California.

Originally commissioned by the Nautical Heritage Society, she has flown the flag of California up and down the coast and in ports ranging from Hawaii, Mexico, and the East Coast. Originally built and operated as a sailing school vessel based in Newport Beach. She also represented the state at the 1984 Summer Olympics in Los Angeles. The model for her figurehead was actress Catherine Bach, who was chosen as she was descended from one of the state's early families.

The Maritime Museum of San Diego acquired Californian from the Nautical Heritage Society in June 2002 through a grant from the Sheila Potiker Family Foundation of San Diego. The California Coastal Conservancy provided the Maritime Museum of San Diego with a US$300,000 grant to complete restoration of the Californian in February 2003. After the overhaul was completed in August 2003 Californian returned to providing sail training and sea educational programs up and down the California coast.

== Notes ==
Footnotes

Citations

References used

- "Californian". The Ships. Maritime Museum of San Diego.
- "California State Tall Ship". Californian. netstate.com.
- "C. W. Lawrence, 1848" (PDF). Cutters, Craft & U.S. Coast Guard-Manned Army & Navy Vessels. U.S. Coast Guard Historian's Office.
- "Dukes' Catherine Bach Model for Tall Ship". Ocala (Florida) Star-Banner. 7 January 1985.
- Canney, Donald L. (1995). U.S. Coast Guard and Revenue Cutters, 1790–1935. Naval Institute Press, Annapolis, Maryland. ISBN 978-1-55750-101-1.
