= San Salvador (Cabrillo's ship) =

Flagship of 16th-century Spanish/Portuguese explorer

Coordinates: 32°43′42″N 117°12′45″W

General characteristics
- Length: 100 ft (30 m)
- Draft: 10 ft (3.0 m)
- Notes: 1542; 484 years ago

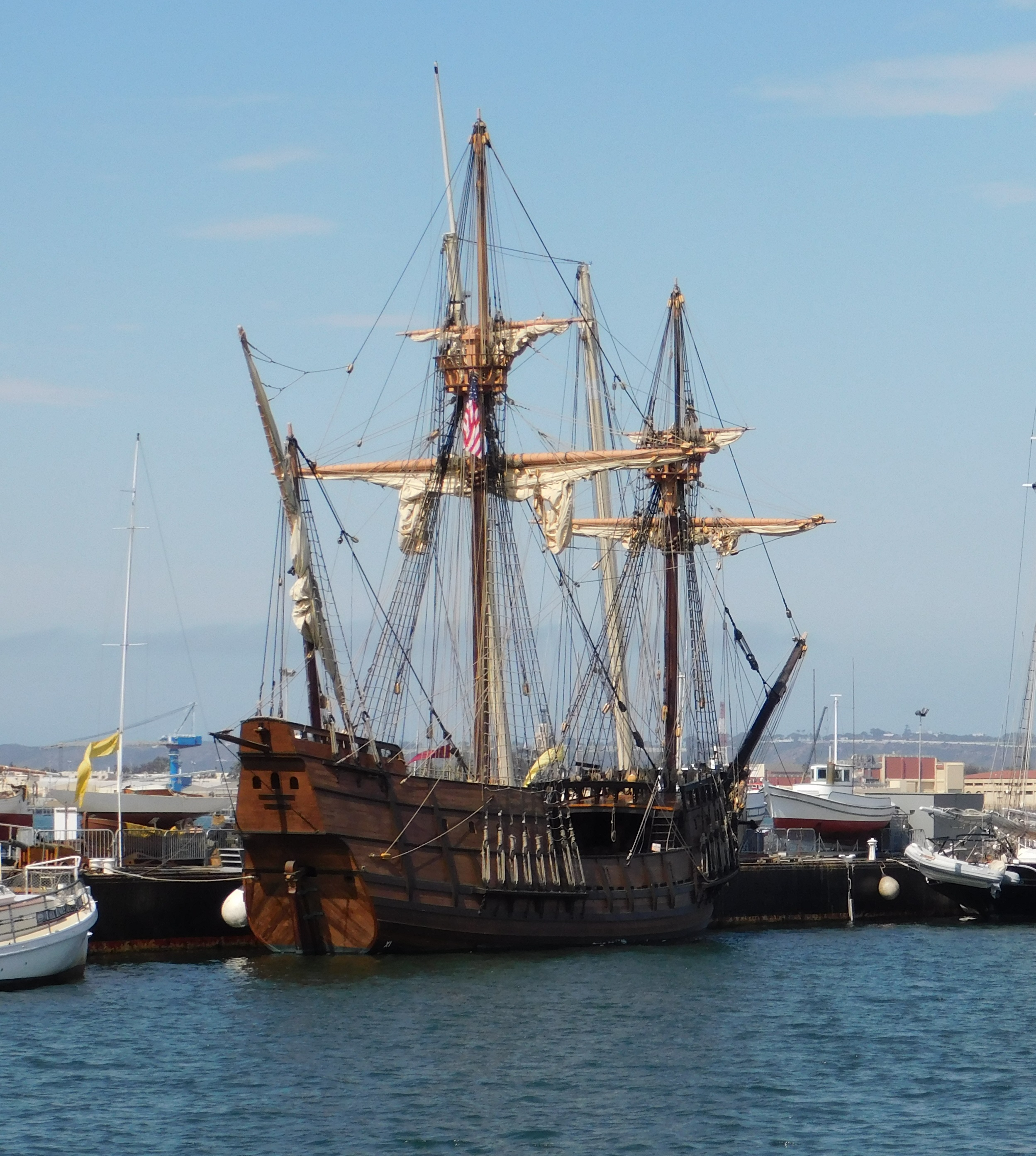
San Diego replica of the San Salvador, Cabrillo's flagship.

San Salvador was the flagship of explorer Juan Rodríguez Cabrillo (João Rodrigues Cabrilho in Portuguese). She was a 100-foot (30 m) full-rigged galleon with 10-foot (3.0 m) draft and capacity of 200 tons. She carried officers, crew, and a priest.

== Explorations ==
In 1542 Cabrillo was the first European to explore the coast of present-day California. He had three ships: the 200-ton galleon San Salvador, the 100-ton La Victoria and lateen-rigged, 26-oared San Miguel. The two ships were not the square-rigged galleons commonly used for crossing open ocean. Rather, they were built in Acajutla, El Salvador. The ship San Salvador, was named after Pedro de Alvarado's newly founded city in western El Salvador, San Salvador, the ship San Miguel was named after the second newly founded city in eastern San Miguel, El Salvador and the ship Victoria was named after the Victory of Pedro de Alvarado after a long and arduous battle, against the Native American resistance in El Salvador. In 1540 the fleet sailed from Acajutla, El Salvador and reached Barra de Navidad, Mexico on Christmas Day. While in Mexico, Pedro de Alvarado went to the assistance of the town of Nochistlán, which was under siege by hostile natives and was killed when his horse fell on him, crushing his chest. Following Alvarado's death, the viceroy took possession of Alvarado's fleet. Part of the fleet was sent off to the Philippine Islands under Ruy Lopez de Villalobos and two of the ships were sent north under the command of Cabrillo. Navidad is some 20 miles (32 km) northwest of Manzanillo. A requirement of exploration ships was the ability to sail with ease into small harbors. The ships were rigged with triangular sails supported by swept booms. This sail arrangement, a forerunner to the sails found in the modern-day fore-and-aft rig of sloops, ketches and yawls, made the craft more agile and gave them the ability to point higher into the wind than square riggers.

Departing from Navidad on 27 June 1542, Cabrillo discovered San Diego Bay on 28 September. He went ashore and claimed the land for Spain. Continuing his explorations northward, he landed on Santa Catalina Island on 7 October and described nearby San Clemente Island. (He gave names to his discoveries but all were renamed later.) He continued north as far as the Russian River before turning back to overwinter at Santa Catalina. Cabrillo died there of an infected injury on 3 January 1543. His second-in-command brought the ships and crew back to Navidad, arriving on 14 April 1543.

== San Salvador replica ==
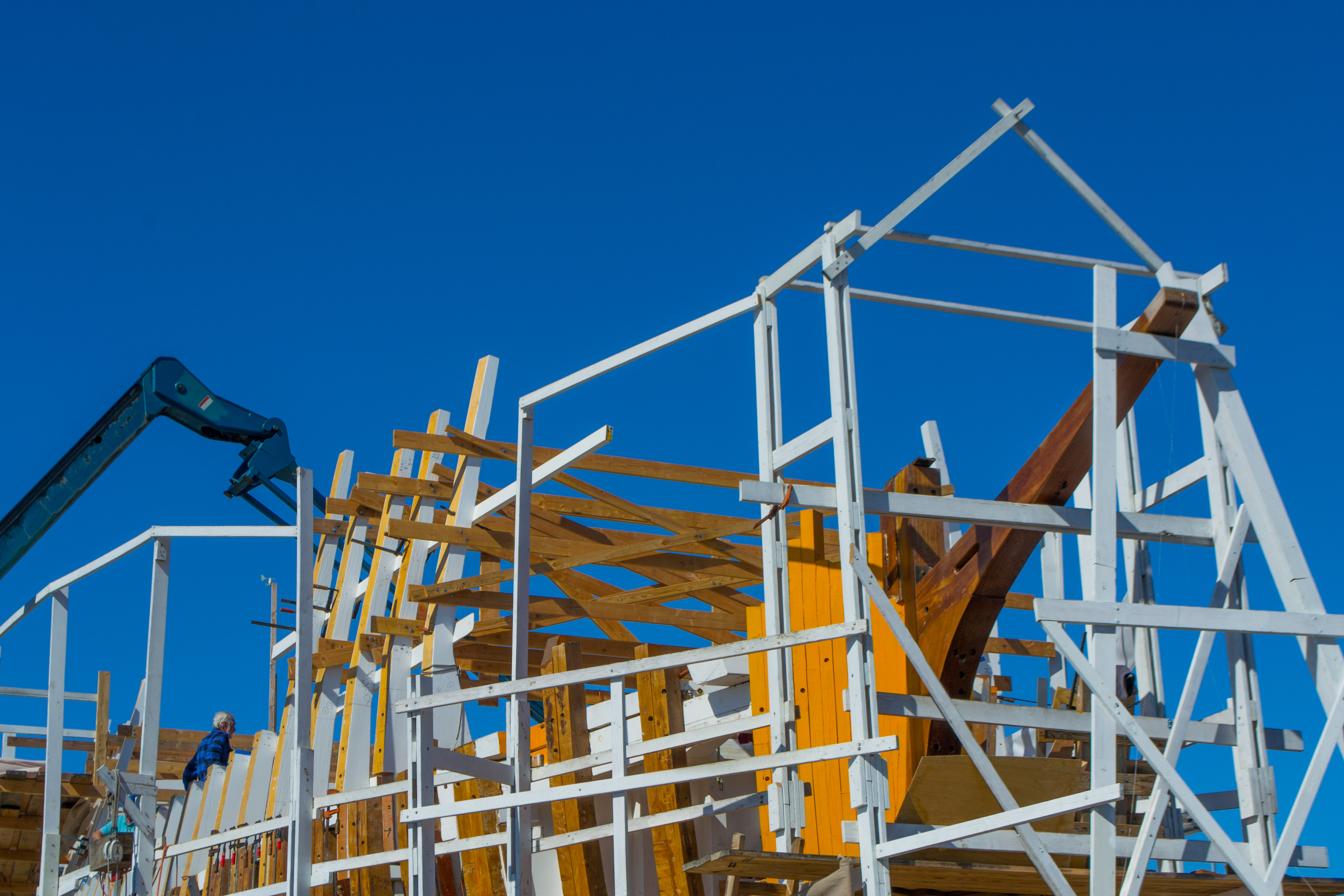
San Salvador replica build site, March 2013

Starting in spring 2011 and concluding in 2015, the Maritime Museum of San Diego built a full-sized, fully functional, historically accurate replica of San Salvador. The ship was constructed in full public view at Spanish Landing park on Harbor Drive in San Diego. The keel was laid on 15 April 2011. The construction site, called "San Salvador Village", opened 24 June 2011 and was open to the public. The project gave people the opportunity to see an example of sixteenth century shipbuilding, which was the first modern industrial activity in the Americas. The replica galleon is 92 feet (28 m) long with a beam of 24 feet (7.3 m). When completed, San Salvador was launched on San Diego Bay and became part of the museum's fleet of historic and replica ships. As of April 2015 construction was nearly completed, and a launch ceremony was planned for 19 April 2015. However, on 8 April the ceremony was postponed due to "unanticipated technical complications involving the movement and lifting of the ship". The ship was eventually moved by barge to a boatyard in Chula Vista. She made her public debut on 4 September 2015, leading a parade of tall ships for the start of San Diego's annual Festival of Sail. At that time she was powered by an auxiliary engine since she had not yet been fitted with sails. She opened for public tours in September 2016 and now sets sail regularly on public sightseeing tours.

In 2018, her original mizzen lateen yard was replaced with a lighter version. The original was considered to be too heavy, resulting in difficulties maneuvering and possible damage to the mizzen mast. Over a dozen crew members were required to remove the original yard, while only four were need to place the replacement.

== Model of San Salvador ==
Cabrillo's flagship San Salvador has been described as having four masts: a square-rigged foremast, lateen-rigged main and mizzen-masts and an even smaller mizzen-type mast with a boom that swung well outboard, in the style of the modern-day yawl. La Victoria is described as having two masts, both lateen rigged. A model of San Salvador was built by Señor Manuel Monmeneu in association with the Naval Museum of Madrid. The model project was sponsored by the Portuguese-American Social and Civic Club of San Diego. This model depicts San Salvador more like La Victoria, with two major masts.

== Ship Cafe (Venice, California) ==
The ship was commemorated in 1904 with the Ship Cafe a stone replica nightclub, in Venice, California.
