= Medea (yacht) =

1904 decommissioned steam vessel

Coordinates: 32.721052°N 117.174300°W

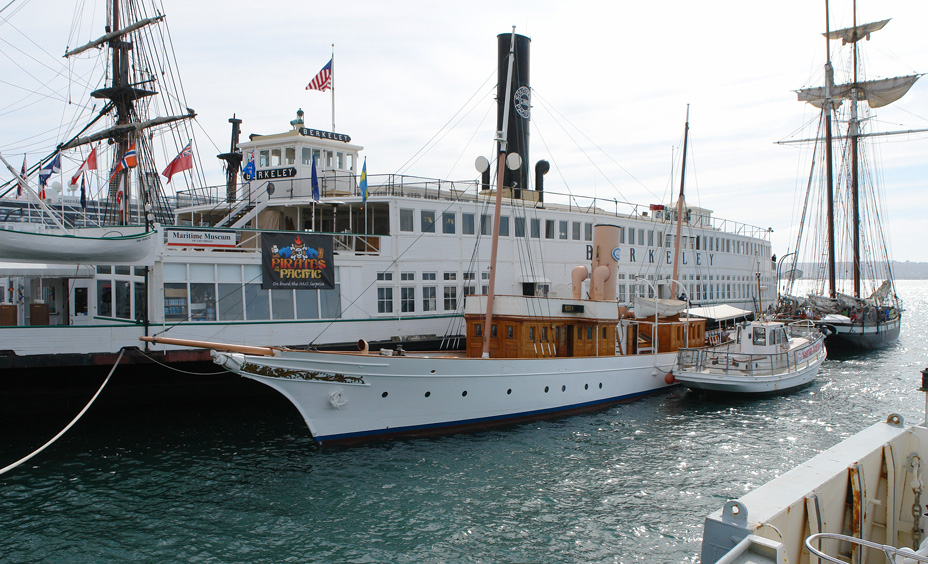
- Medea at the Maritime Museum of San Diego

History

United States
- Name: Medea
- Namesake: Medea
- Owner: Maritime Museum of San Diego
- Builder: Alexander Stephen and Sons
- Completed: 1904
- Status: Museum ship

General characteristics
- Type: Steam yacht
- Tonnage: 143 (gross)
- Length: 109.7 feet (33.4 m) (LWL); 134 feet (41 m) (LOA)
- Beam: 17 feet (5.2 m)
- Draft: 8 feet (2.4 m)
- Installed power: 2-cylinder compound reciprocating steam engine, 254 hp
- Speed: 8.5–10 knots (15.7–18.5 km/h; 9.8–11.5 mph)

The Medea is a 1904 steam yacht preserved in the Maritime Museum of San Diego, United States. Named after Medea, the wife of Jason, she was built in a record 51 days on the Clyde at Alexander Stephen and Sons shipyard at Linthouse by John Stephen for William Macalister Hall of Torrisdale Castle, Scotland.

During World War I, the French Navy purchased Medea and armed her with a 75mm cannon for use in convoy escort duty. (Her name under the French flag was Corneille.) Between the wars, she was owned by members of Parliament. During World War II, the Royal Navy put her to work anchoring barrage balloons at the mouth of the River Thames.

After World War II, Medea passed among Norwegian, British, and Swedish owners before being purchased by Paul Whittier in 1971. Whittier restored the yacht to its original condition and donated her to the Maritime Museum of San Diego in 1973.

According to the Maritime Museum of San Diego, “Medea still cruises the Bay on special excursion cruises for invited guests.” She is not permitted to carrying passengers, but is available dockside for visitors.
