= Edward Kritzler =

Jamaican historian (died 2010)

Edward Heyward Kritzler (died 2010) was a Jamaican popular historian, specializing in the Sephardic diaspora in the wake of the expulsion of the Jews from Spain, and the Jewish identity continuity in the "New World", Amsterdam, the Maghreb, and Ottoman eastern Mediterranean.

== Published works ==
- Kritzler, Edward (2009). Jewish Pirates of the Caribbean. Anchor Books, Random House. ISBN 978-0-7679-1952-4. Reprint of 1st edition, Doubleday (2008)
- Kritzler, Edward (2008-12-21). "Jewish Pirates of the Caribbean". The Daily Beast.
