= Star of India (ship) =

Museum ship harbored in San Diego, USA

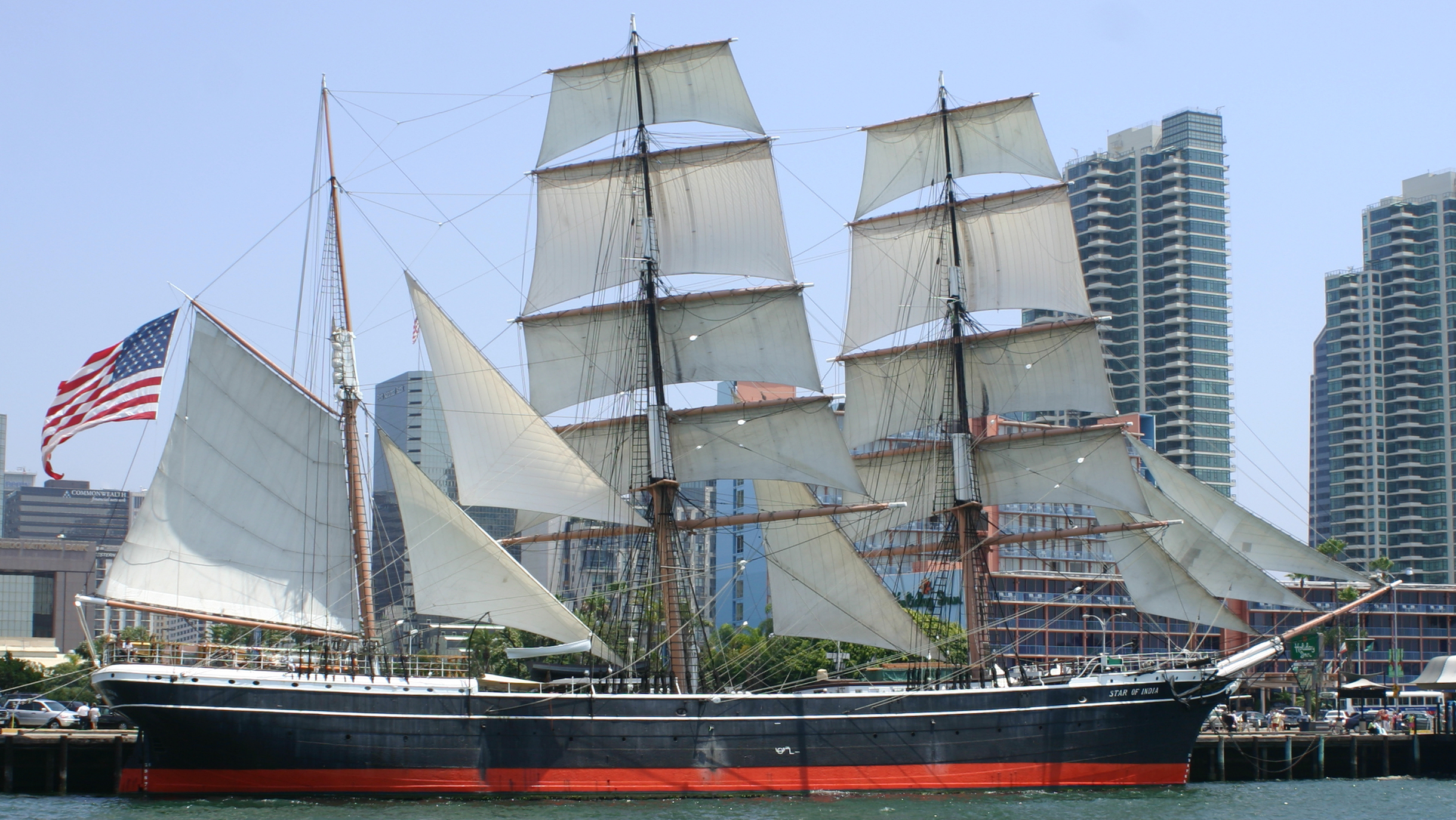
- Star of India docked in San Diego

History

United Kingdom
- Name: Euterpe (1863–1906); Star of India (1906–)
- Builder: Gibson, McDonald & Arnold
- Launched: 14 November 1863
- In service: 1906
- Fate: Sold to the United States

United States
- Acquired: 1906
- Identification: IMO number: 8640337
- Fate: Operational museum ship

General characteristics
- Tonnage: 1,197 tons gross, 1,107 tons under deck (Euterpe); 1,318 tons gross, 1,247 tons net (Star of India)
- Length: 62.5 m (205 ft) LWL; 84.8 m (278 ft) sparred length
- Beam: 10.7 m (35 ft)
- Height: To weather rail: 7.1 m (23 ft) (full-rigged); 6.5 m (21 ft) (barque rigged); Deck to top of mast:38.8 m (127 ft)
- Draft: 6.6 m (22 ft) (fully loaded)
- Sail plan: Full-rigged ship (1863–1901); Barque (1901–)
- Star of India
- U.S. National Register of Historic Places
- U.S. National Historic Landmark
- California Historical Landmark
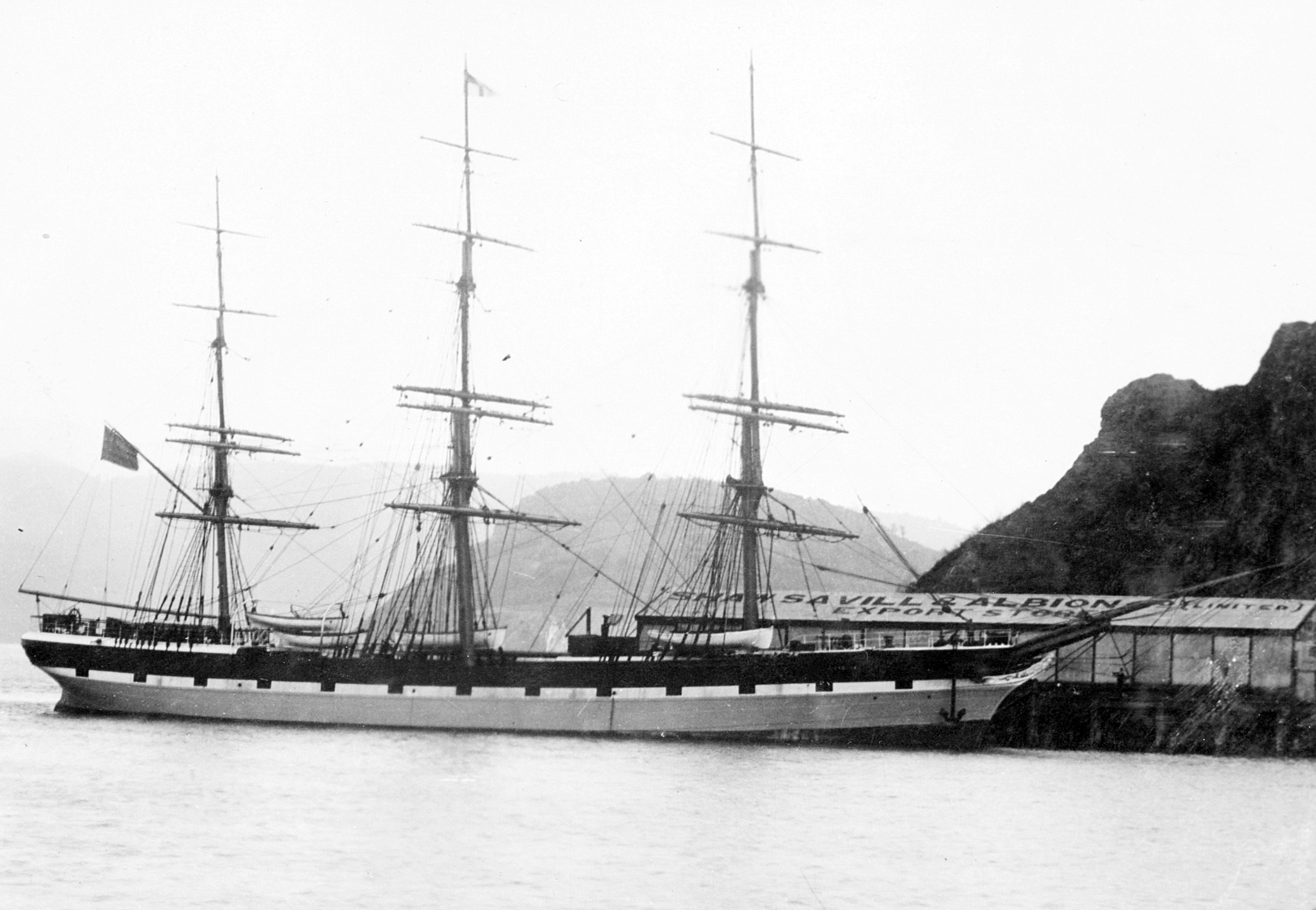
- Euterpe at Port Chalmers, the port of Dunedin, in 1883

- Location within California
- Location: San Diego Embarcadero, San Diego, California
- Coordinates: 32°43′13.5″N 117°10′24.7″W
- Built: 1863
- Architectural style: Three-masted bark
- NRHP reference No.: 66000223
- CHISL No.: 1030

Significant dates
- Added to NRHP: 13 November 1966
- Designated NHL: 13 November 1966

Star of India is an iron-hulled sailing ship, built in 1863 in Ramsey, Isle of Man, as the full-rigged ship Euterpe. After a career sailing from Great Britain to India and New Zealand, she was renamed, re-rigged as a barque, and became a salmon hauler on the Alaska to California route. Retired in 1926, she was restored as a seaworthy museum ship in 1962–3 and home-ported at the Maritime Museum of San Diego in San Diego, California. She is the oldest ship still sailing regularly and also the oldest iron-hulled merchant ship still afloat. The ship is both a California Historical Landmark and United States National Historic Landmark.

== History ==
=== As Euterpe ===
Named after Euterpe, the Greek muse of music, she was a full-rigged ship (a ship that is square-rigged on all three masts), built of iron in 1863 by Gibson, McDonald & Arnold, of Ramsey, Isle of Man, for the Indian jute trade of Wakefield Nash & Company of Liverpool. She was launched on 14 November 1863, and assigned British Registration No.47617 and signal VPJK.

The Ramsey yard had been purchased in 1854 and redeveloped with a patent slip, quay walls and housing for its workers by its proprietor, Thomas Cummings Gibson. At her launch, Euterpe was christened with a bottle of port wine by Mrs Brown, the wife of one of her owners. She entered the water without masts, as was customary at the time, and was fully rigged as a three-masted ship four weeks later. The vessel cost £25,000 to build, and its hand-wrought, riveted iron hull has survived essentially unchanged since 1863.

Euterpe's career had a rough beginning. She sailed for Calcutta from Liverpool on 9 January 1864, under the command of Captain William John Storry. A collision with an unlit Spanish brig off the coast of Wales carried away the jib-boom and damaged other rigging. The crew became mutinous, refusing to continue, and she returned to Anglesey for repair; 17 of the crew were confined to the Beaumaris Gaol at hard labour. Then, in 1865, Euterpe was forced to cut away her masts in a gale in the Bay of Bengal off Madras and limped to Trincomalee and Calcutta for repair. Captain Storry died during the return voyage to England and was buried at sea.

After her near-disastrous first two voyages Euterpe was sold, first in 1871 to David Brown of London for whom she made four more relatively uneventful voyages to India, then again (displaced by steamers after the opening of the Suez Canal) in 1871 to Shaw, Savill and Company of London (which in 1882 became the Shaw, Savill & Albion Line). In late 1871 she began 25 years of carrying passengers and freight in the New Zealand emigrant trade, each voyage going eastward around the world before returning to England. The fastest of her 21 passages to New Zealand took 100 days, the longest 143 days. She also made ports of call in Australia, California, and Chile. A baby was born on one of those trips en route to New Zealand, and was given the middle name Euterpe. Another child, John William Philips Palmer, was born on the 1873 journey to Dunedin, New Zealand, and was partially named after the captain Theo E. Philips

In 1897, after 21 round-the-world trips, Euterpe was sold, first to Hawaiian owners, then in 1899 to the Pacific Colonial Ship Company of San Francisco, California, and from 1898 to 1901 made four voyages between the Pacific Northwest, Australia and Hawaii carrying primarily lumber, coal and sugar. She was registered in the United States on 30 October 1900.

=== As Star of India ===
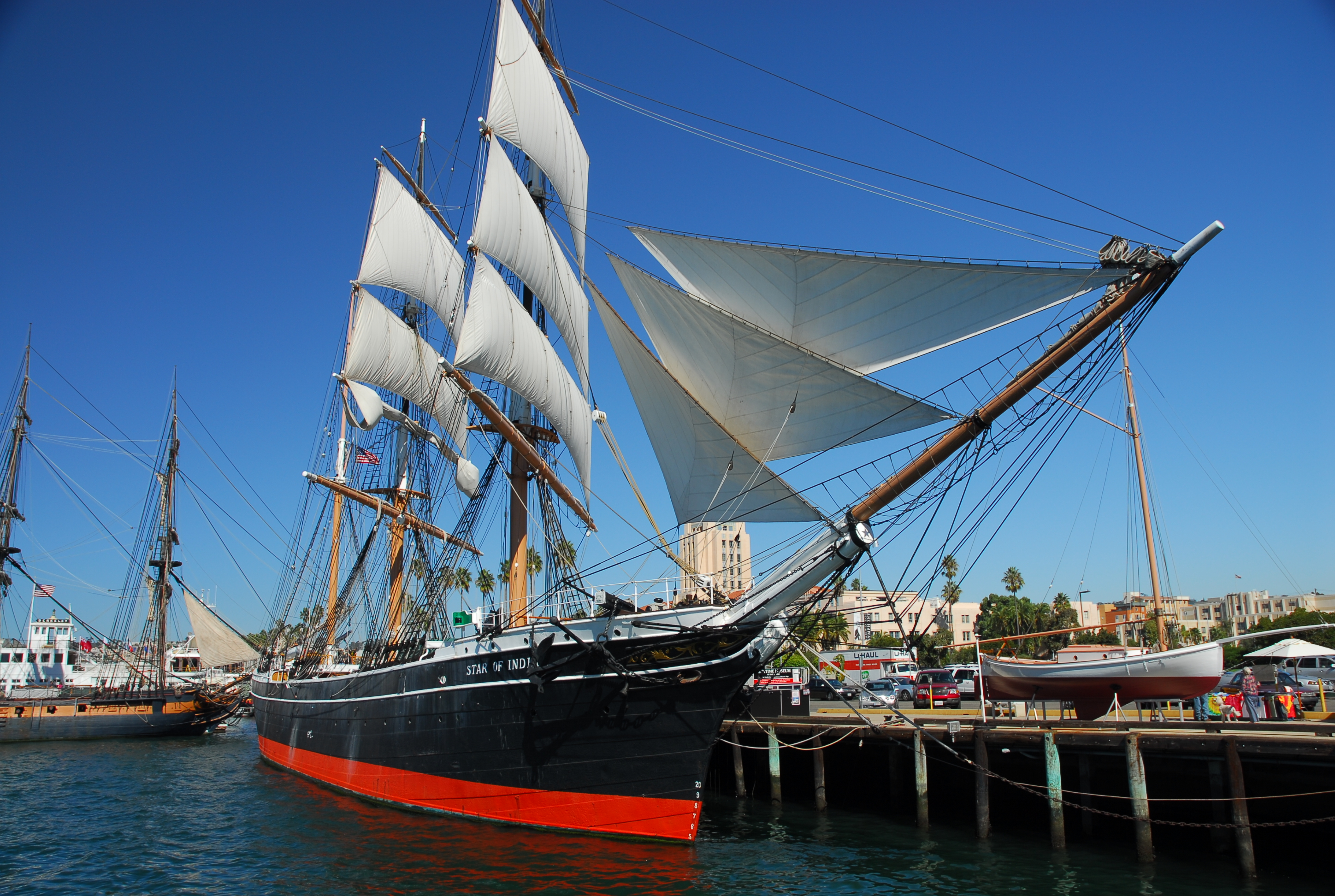
Star of India docked in San Diego

In 1901, Euterpe was sold to the Alaska Packers' Association of San Francisco, who re-rigged her as a barque (converting the square-rigged aftermost mast to fore-and-aft) and in 1902 began carrying fishermen, cannery workers, coal and canning supplies each spring from Oakland, California, to Nushagak in the Bering Sea, returning each autumn with holds full of canned salmon. In 1906, the Association changed her name to be consistent with the rest of their fleet, and she became Star of India. She was laid up in 1923 after 22 Alaskan voyages; by that time, steam ruled the seas.

In 1926, Star of India was sold to the Zoological Society of San Diego to be the centrepiece of a planned museum and aquarium. The Great Depression and World War II caused that plan to be cancelled, and it was not until 1957 that restoration began. Alan Villiers, a windjammer captain and author, came to San Diego on a lecture tour. Seeing Star of India decaying in the harbor, he publicized the situation and inspired a group of citizens to form the "Star of India Auxiliary" in 1959 to support the restoration of the ship. Progress was still slow, but in 1976, Star of India finally put to sea again. She houses exhibits for the Maritime Museum of San Diego, is kept fully seaworthy, and sails at least once a year. With the many other ships now in the Museum, she hosts frequent tour guide-led school tours for over 6,000 children a year, as well as a Living History Program in which students "step back in time" and are immersed in history and teamwork activities during overnight visits.

The 1863 Star of India is the fourth oldest ship afloat in the United States, after the 1797 USS Constitution, 1841 Charles W. Morgan, and the 1854 USS Constellation, and is the oldest ship in the world that still sails regularly. Unlike many preserved or restored vessels, her hull, cabins and equipment are nearly 100% original.

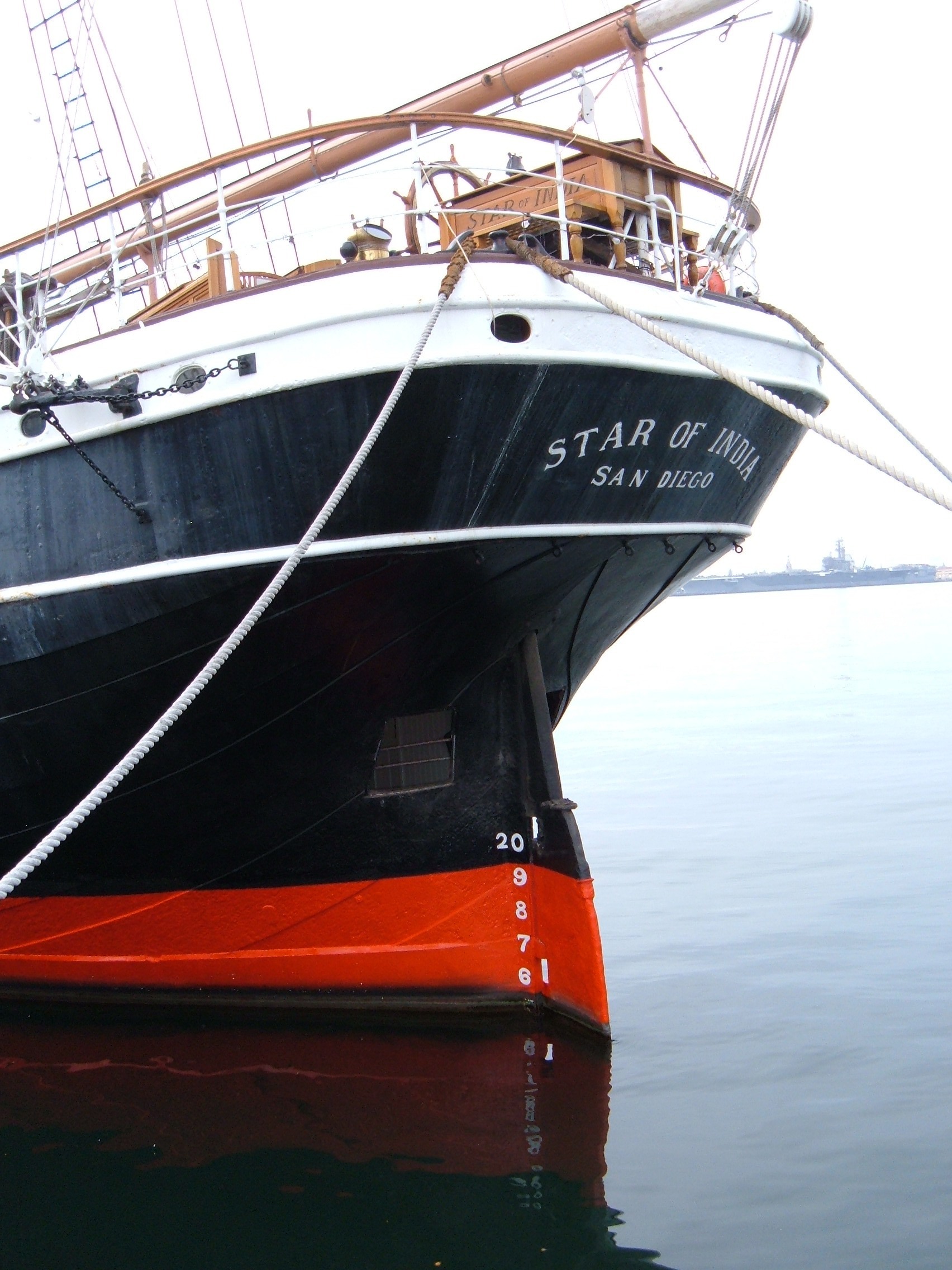
Star of India stern and Taffrail

== Home port ==
Star of India is docked at the Maritime Museum of San Diego, just south of San Diego International Airport, on the west side of North Harbor Drive at approximately Ash Street – all within the Port of San Diego tidelands. This location is slightly west of downtown San Diego, California. The other ships belonging to the Maritime Museum are always docked to the north of Star of India. Her nearest neighbour – since 2007 – is HMS Surprise (a.k.a. HMS Rose), a replica of a British frigate.

When she sails, Star of India often remains close to the coast of San Diego County, and usually returns to her dock within a day. She is sailed by a volunteer crew of Maritime Museum members. She has become one of the landmark ships in San Diego's harbor.

From August to September 2009, Star of India was removed from display to a local drydock facility for a required Coast Guard inspection and various maintenance below the waterline, at a cost of approximately $225,000, and 3–4 weeks off display.

Her most recent voyage was on November 12, 2023.

== Appearances in media ==
Star of India has appeared in episodes of:

- Dirty Jobs Season Four, Episode 89, "Tar Rigger"
- Ghost Hunters Season Four, Episode 426, "Spirits on the Water".
- Great Ships episode "The Windjammers".
- Haunted History Season One, Episode 3, "Haunted Ships"
- Ghost Adventures Season 12, Episode 6 "Star of India"
- There Goes a Boat, episode 7 of the Real Wheels children's series.

At the 2013 San Diego Comic-Con, Ubisoft used the ship to promote their new game Assassin's Creed IV: Black Flag and renamed the ship for 3 days after the in-game ship The Jackdaw.
