= Maritime Museum of San Diego =

- Location within San Diego Location within California Location within the United States
- Established: 1948
- Location: San Diego, California, United States
- Coordinates: 32.720639°N 117.173417°W
- Type: Maritime museum
- Key holdings: Star of India; Berkeley; Californian; Medea
- Visitors: 220,000
- President: DR. Christina Brophy
- Public transit access: County Center/Little Italy
- Parking: Street
- Website: www.sdmaritime.org

The Maritime Museum of San Diego is a maritime museum in San Diego, California. Established in 1948, it preserves one of the largest collections of historic sea vessels in the United States. Located on San Diego Bay, the centerpiece of the museum's collection is Star of India, an 1863 iron barque. The museum maintains the MacMullen Library and Research Archives aboard the 1898 ferryboat Berkeley. It publishes the quarterly peer-reviewed journal Mains'l Haul: A Journal of Pacific Maritime History.

== Vessels in the museum's collection ==
=== Current collection ===
- Star of India, 1863 merchant barque, the oldest ship still sailing regularly and also the oldest iron-hulled merchant ship still afloat.
- Berkeley, 1898 ferryboat from the San Francisco Bay area
- Californian, 1984 replica of 1847 cutter C.W. Lawrence and official tall ship of the state of California
- America, 1995 replica of the 1851 yacht America that won the trophy now called the America's Cup
- Medea, 1904 steam yacht that served in both World Wars
- Pilot, 1914 harbor pilot boat
- HMS Surprise, a 1970 replica of a Royal Navy frigate. Surprise was used in the film Master and Commander: The Far Side of the World. The ship also made an appearance in Pirates of the Caribbean: On Stranger Tides as HMS Providence.
- USS Dolphin AGSS-555, diesel-electric submarine launched in 1968 and decommissioned in 2007
- PCF-816 (formerly C24 or P24), 1968 Patrol Craft Fast that was transferred to Malta in 1971 and decommissioned in 2011
- San Salvador, a replica of Juan Rodríguez Cabrillo's galleon which was the first European ship to visit San Diego Bay in 1542.
- A railroad barge is docked behind the Berkeley. Many guests mistake it for a floating dock because it no longer has its tracks. In the lower deck are workshops and storerooms used by the museum for the maintenance of the collection.

=== Former collection ===
- B-39, Soviet Foxtrot class submarine; as of October 2021 the sub is being removed from the collection and sold for scrap. She was finally towed to a scrap yard in Ensenada in February 2022.

== San Salvador replica ==
Starting in 2011 the Maritime Museum of San Diego built a full-sized, fully functional, historically accurate replica of Juan Rodríguez Cabrillo’s flagship, San Salvador. The replica was constructed in full public view in the bayside Spanish Landing Park in San Diego, giving people the opportunity to watch a living recreation of the first modern industrial activity in the Americas. She was launched in 2015 and is stationed at the San Diego Bay Embarcadero as part of the Museum's fleet of historic and replica ships. She opened for public tours in September 2016 in conjunction with the Maritime Museum's annual Festival of Sail. Later that month she is expected to start making coastal tours up the California coast.

== Gallery ==
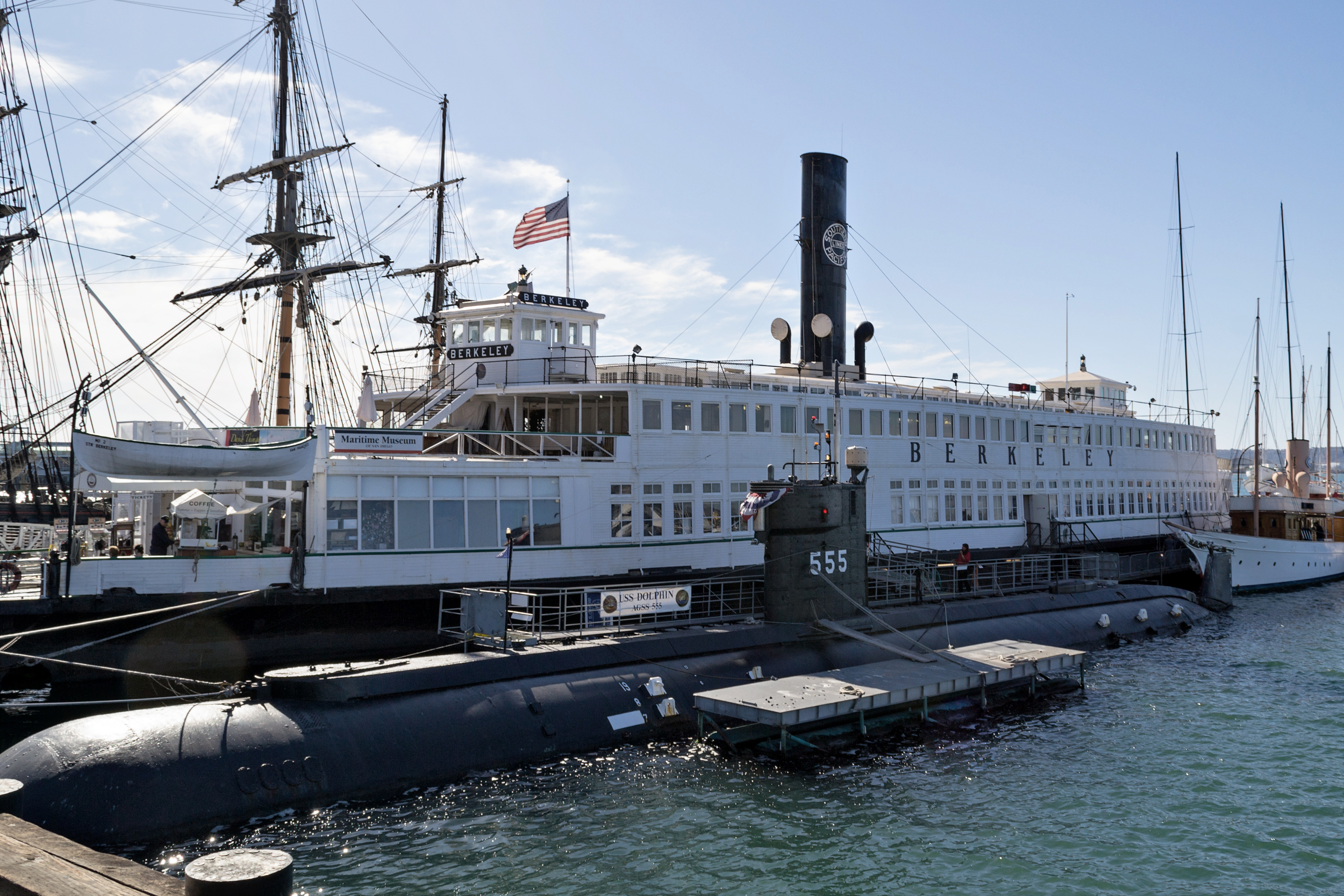
The ferryboat Berkeley, housing the San Diego Maritime Museum and USS Dolphin

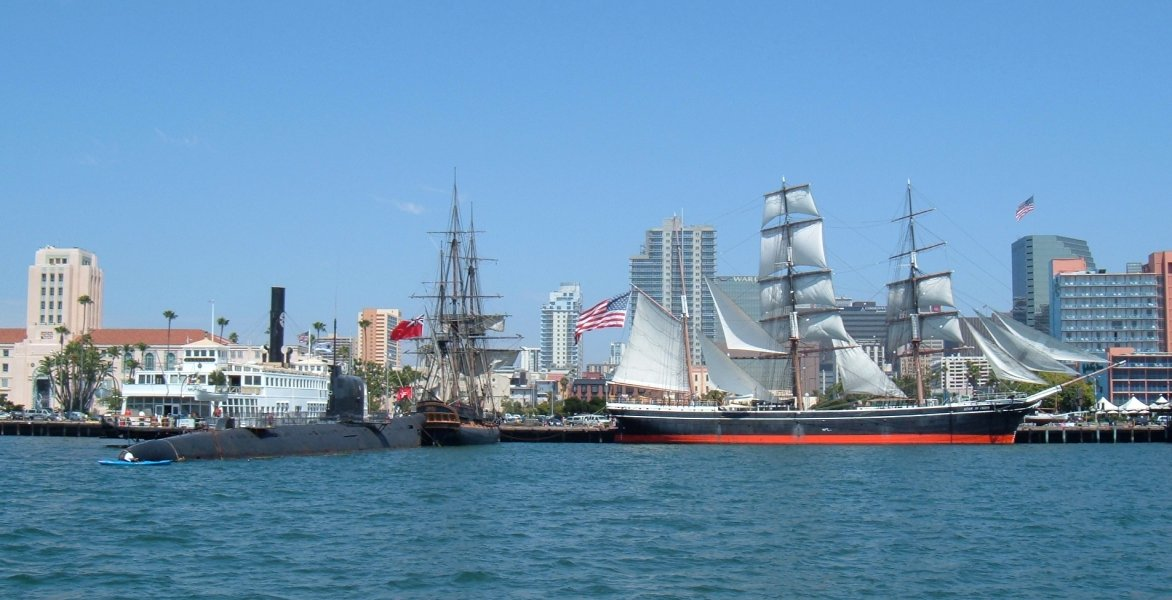
Overall view of the museum's ships.

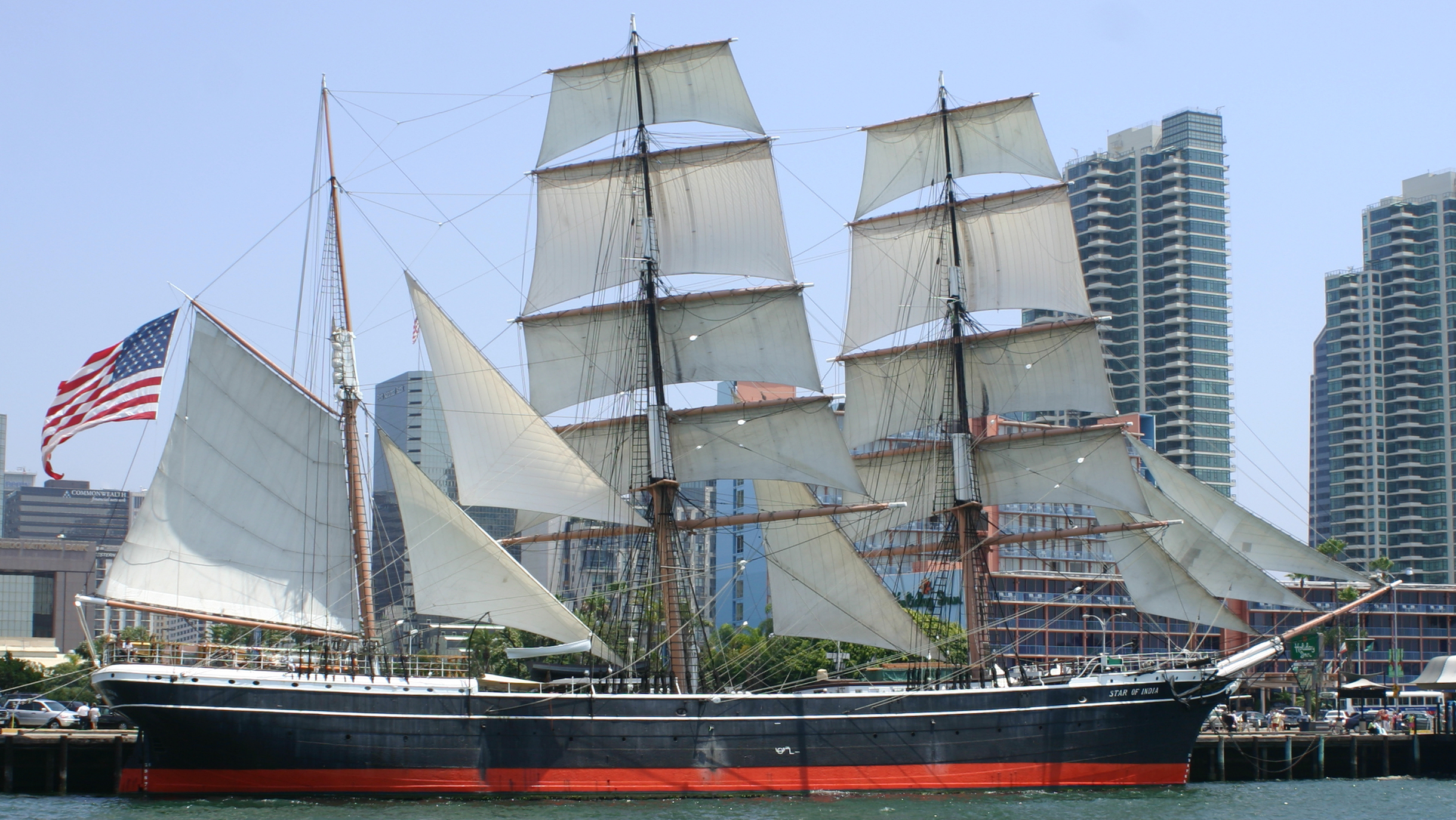
Star of India.

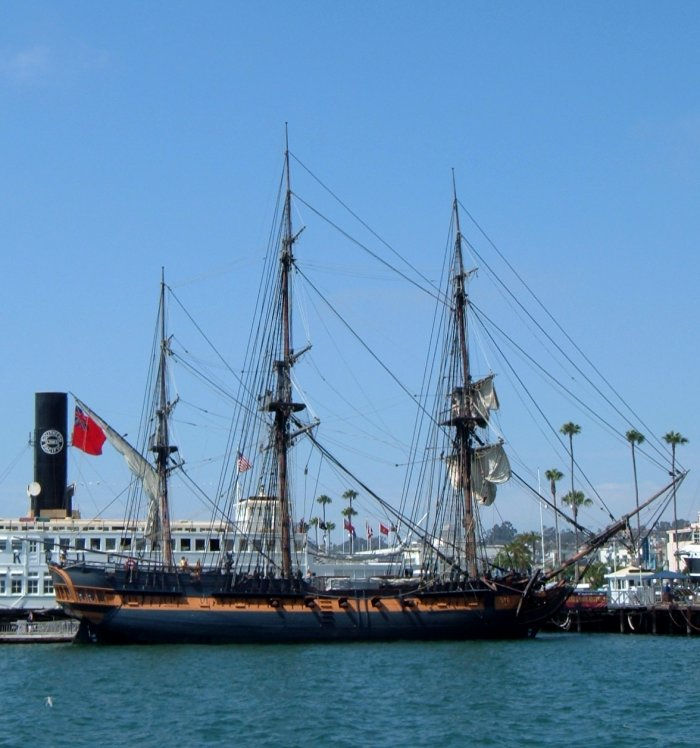
HMS Surprise.

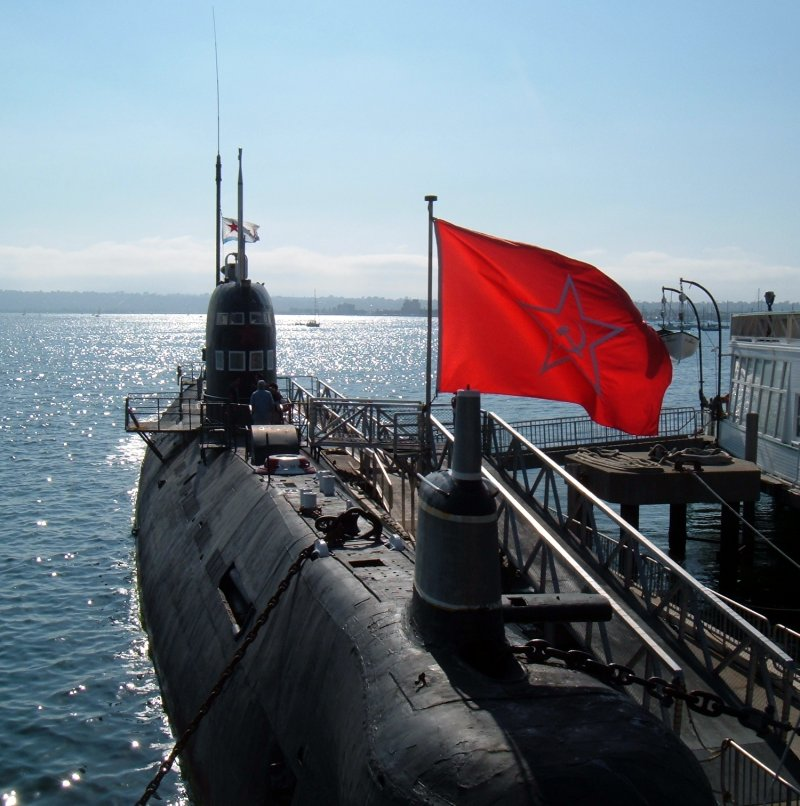
B-39.

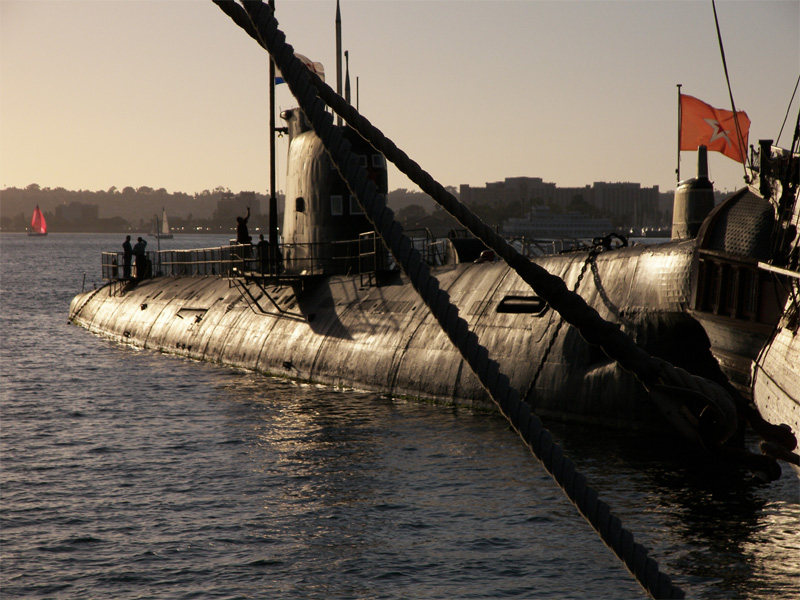
Another picture of B-39

== Midway Museum ==
Not affiliated with the Maritime Museum, but located a short distance away, is the independently operated USS Midway Aircraft Carrier Museum. Although at first it was feared the Midway would compete with the Maritime Museum for visitors, in fact visitation of the Maritime Museum has increased since the Midway museum opened.

== See also ==
- List of maritime museums in the United States
- List of museum ships
