= List of museum ships in North America =

This list of museum ships in North America is a list of notable museum ships located in the continent of North America and it may include ones in overseas parts of Canada and the United States. This includes "ships preserved in museums" defined broadly, but is intended to be limited to substantial (large) ships or, in a few cases, very notable boats or dugout canoes or the like. This does not include submarines; see List of submarine museums for those. This includes ships formerly serving as museums or preserved at museums, as well as current ones. This includes ships on static display or floating and sometimes used for excursions. It includes only genuine historic ships; replica ships, some associated with museums, are listed separately in the List of ship replicas.

Some historic ships actively used for excursions, and not previously or currently associated with museums, are included in the list of classic vessels. For shipwrecks that may be visited by diving, including some perhaps associated with museums, see List of shipwrecks.

Ships whose coordinates are included below may be seen together in map accessed by clicking on "Map all coordinates using OpenStreetMap" at the right side of this page.

== Canada ==
Ship	Image	Year launched	Origin	Type	Location	Notes
CSS Acadia		1913	Canada	Hydrographic Research ship	Maritime Museum of the Atlantic; Halifax, Nova Scotia, Canada; 44.64798°N 63.56992°W	
CCGS Alexander Henry		1958	Canada	Icebreaker	Lakehead Transportation Museum Society, Thunder Bay, Ontario; 44.22458°N 76.48236°W	
Ancaster		1951	Canada	Tugboat	Owen Sound Marine & Rail Museum, Owen Sound, Ontario; 44.57113°N 80.94457°W	Appeared on Canadian $1 bill from 1974 to 1989.
MS Chickama II		1942	Canada	Passenger ship	Marine Museum of Manitoba, Selkirk, Manitoba; 50.14642°N 96.86471°W	
CCGS Bradbury		1915	Canada	Fisheries patrol vessel	Marine Museum of Manitoba, Selkirk, Manitoba; 50.14638°N 96.86511°W	
HMCS Bras d'Or		1968	Canada	Hydrofoil	Musée Maritime du Québec, L'Islet, Quebec; 47.12919°N 70.37209°W	
J.E. Bernier II		1975	Canada	Sailing boat	Musée Maritime du Québec, L'Islet, Quebec; 47.12934°N 70.37160°W	
CCGS Ernest Lapointe		1940	Canada	Icebreaker	Musée Maritime du Québec, L'Islet-sur-Mer, Quebec; 47.12906°N 70.37220°W	
Flecia		1923	Canada	Tugboat	Musée Maritime de Charlevoix, Saint-Joseph-de-la-Rive, Quebec; 47.45591°N 70.36120°W	
HMCS Haida		1942	Canada	Destroyer	HMCS Haida National Historic Site, Hamilton, Ontario; 43.27534°N 79.85542°W	
Jean-Yvan		1958	Canada		Musée Maritime de Charlevoix, Saint-Joseph-de-la-Rive, Quebec; 47.45638°N 70.36261°W	
Joe Simpson		1963	Canada	Freighter	Marine Museum of Manitoba, Selkirk, Manitoba; 50.14619°N 96.86456°W	
SS Keenora		1897	Canada	Steamboat	Marine Museum of Manitoba, Selkirk, Manitoba; 50.14643°N 96.86493°W	
SS Keewatin		1907	Canada	Passenger ship	Kingston, Ontario; 44.2251283136°N 76.48°W	
SS Keno		1922	Canada	Sternwheeler	Dawson City, Yukon; 64.0632°N 139.435°W	
SS Klondike		1937	Canada	Sternwheeler	Whitehorse, Yukon; 60.71351°N 135.04734°W	
MS Lady Canadian		1944	Canada	Fishing vessel	Marine Museum of Manitoba, Selkirk, Manitoba; 50.14635°N 96.86453°W	
Marie Clarisse II		1923	Canada	Schooner	Musée Maritime de Charlevoix, Saint-Joseph-de-la-Rive, Quebec; 47.45615°N 70.36239°W	Built in Shelburne, Nova Scotia, as fishing schooner Archie F. Mackenzie.
Moyie		1898	Canada	Sternwheeler	Kaslo, British Columbia; 49.9117°N 116.9023°W	World's oldest intact passenger sternwheeler
Ned Hanlan		1943	Canada	Tugboat	Hanlan's Point, Toronto Islands; 43.62798°N 79.38940°W	
SS Naramata		1914	Canada	Tugboat	Penticton, British Columbia; 49.50216°N 119.61149°W	
MS Normac		1902	Canada	Ferry	Port Dalhousie, Ontario; 43.20734°N 79.26151°W	Riverboat Mexican Grill
Persephone		1965	Canada	Tugboat	Gibsons, British Columbia; 49.40178°N 123.50578°W	Used in TV series The Beachcombers
Peguis II		1955	Canada	Tugboat	Marine Museum of Manitoba, Selkirk, Manitoba; 50.14617°N 96.86515°W	
R.F. Grant		1934	Canada	Tugboat	Parc Maritime de Saint-Laurent	
Radium King		1937	Canada	Tugboat	Northern Life Museum	
HMCS Sackville		1941	Canada	Corvette	Maritime Museum of the Atlantic; Halifax, Nova Scotia, Canada; 44.64748°N 63.56929°W	
St. André		1956	Canada	St-Lawrence Motor Schooner	Musée Maritime de Charlevoix, Saint-Joseph-de-la-Rive, Quebec; 47.45543°N 70.36206°W	Holds 10-minute multi-media experience inside.
RCMPV St Roch		1928	Canada	Schooner	Vancouver Maritime Museum, Vancouver, BC	Circumnavigated North America in 1950, a first.
SS Sicamous		1914	Canada	Sternwheeler	Penticton, BC; 49.50184°N 119.61099°W	
Tilikum		1850	(United Kingdom) Canada	Dugout canoe	Maritime Museum of BC, Victoria, BC; 48.42591°N 123.36879°W	

Former

Ship	Image	Preservation location	From	Year launched	Type	Fate	Remarks
James Whalen		Thunder Bay	Canada	1906	Tugboat	Scrapped in 2025	
SS Norisle		Assiginack	Canada	1946	Ferry	Scrapped at Port Colborne.	
MS Norgoma		Sault Ste. Marie	Canada	1950	Ferry	Awaiting scrapping at Sault Ste Marie.	

== Cuba ==
Ship	Image	Year launched	Origin	Type	Location	Notes
Granma		1943	Cuba	Cabin cruiser	Memorial Granma, Havana, Cuba; 23.14083°N 82.35694°W	Transported Fidel Castro, Che Guevara and 80 other revolutionaries to Cuba in 1956.

== Mexico ==
Former

Ship	Image	Preservation location	From	Year launched	Type	Fate	Remarks
ARM Durango		Mazatlán, Sinaloa	Mexico	1935	Gunboat	Scrapped in 2009.	
ARM Guanajuato		Boca del Río, Veracruz; 19.10045°N 96.10423°W	Mexico	1934	Gunboat	Scrapped in 2023.	

== United States ==
See also List of museum ships of the United States military, which is organized by military service and includes museum ships "of" the United States preserved in other nations.

=== Alabama ===
See also List of submarine museums in the United States, which includes at least one in Alabama

Ship	Image	Year launched	Origin	Type	Location	Notes
USS Alabama		1942	United States	Battleship	Battleship Memorial Park, Mobile, Alabama; 30.68178°N 88.01448°W	Battleship which served in the North Atlantic then in the Pacific, including bombardments of Okinawa and the Japanese mainland.
Montgomery		1925	United States	Snagboat	Tom Bevill Lock and Dam Visitor Center, Pickensville, Alabama; 33.21222°N 88.28611°W	Steam-powered sternwheel-propelled US Army Corps of Engineers' ship which cleared obstructions in navigable rivers of Alabama, Georgia, and Florida until 1982.

=== Alaska ===
Ship	Image	Year launched	Origin	Type	Location	Notes
Libby's No. 23		1914	United States	Sailboat	Lake Clark National Park and Preserve, Alaska; 60°11′51″N 154°19′20″W	
Nenana		1933	United States	Sternwheeler	Pioneer Park, Fairbanks, Alaska	
Chugach		1926	United States	Wooden Motor Vessel	Wrangell Museum, Wrangell, Alaska	

=== Arkansas ===
See also List of submarine museums in the United States, which includes at least one in Arkansas

Ship	Image	Year launched	Origin	Type	Location	Notes
Hoga		1940	United States	District harbor tug	Arkansas Inland Maritime Museum, North Little Rock, Arkansas; 34.75227°N 92.26688°W	Pearl Harbor participant

=== California ===
See also List of submarine museums in the United States, which includes at least six in California

Ship	Image	Year launched	Origin	Type	Location	Notes
Alma		1891	United States	Schooner	San Francisco Maritime National Historical Park, San Francisco, California; 37.81042°N 122.42278°W	
Alma		1927	United States	Tugboat	Morro Bay Maritime Museum, Morro Bay, California; 35.37049°N 120.85544°W	
Angels Gate		1944	United States	Tugboat	Los Angeles Maritime Museum, San Pedro, Los Angeles, California	
Balclutha		1886	United States	Full-rigged ship	San Francisco Maritime National Historical Park, California; 37.80982°N 122.42249°W	
Berkeley		1898	United States	Ferryboat	Maritime Museum of San Diego, San Diego, California; 32.72095°N 117.17395°W	
C.A. Thayer		1895	United States	Schooner	San Francisco Maritime National Historic Park, San Francisco, California	
Eppleton Hall		1914	United Kingdom	Tugboat	San Francisco Maritime National Historical Park	
Eureka		1890	United States	Paddle steamer	San Francisco Maritime National Historic Park, California	
CCB-18		1968	United States	River monitor	Vietnam Unit Memorial Monument, Naval Amphibious Base Coronado, Coronado, California; 32.67174°N 117.16130°W	
CG 30615		1983	United States	Lifeboat	Morro Bay Maritime Museum, Morro Bay, California; 35.37053°N 120.85560°W	
Hercules		1907	United States	Tugboat	Hyde Street Pier, San Francisco Maritime National Historical Park, San Francisco, California; 37.81°N 122.42222°W	
USS Hornet		1943	United States	Aircraft carrier	USS Hornet Museum, Naval Air Station Alameda, Alameda, California; 37.77254°N 122.30284°W	
USS Iowa		1942	United States	Battleship	USS Iowa Museum, Port of Los Angeles, Los Angeles, California; 33.7423°N 118.2772°W	
SS Jeremiah O'Brien		1943	United States	Cargo ship	Pier 45, San Francisco, California; 37.81111°N 122.41806°W	
SS Lane Victory		1945	United States	Cargo ship	San Pedro, California; 33.717222°N 118.273333°W	Rare surviving Victory ship; served in WWII, the Korean War, and the Vietnam War
USS LCI(L)-1091		1944	United States	Landing Craft Infantry	Humboldt Bay, Samoa, California; 40.81888°N 124.18073°W	
USS LCS(L)(3)-102		1944	United States	Landing Craft Support	Mare Island Historic Park, Vallejo, California; 38.10613°N 122.27380°W	
USS Lucid		1953	United States	Minesweeper	Stockton, California; 37.95387°N 121.34258°W	
Medea		1904	United States	Steam yacht	Maritime Museum of San Diego, San Diego, California	
USS Midway		1945	United States	Aircraft carrier	USS Midway Museum, San Diego, California; 32.71445°N 117.17315°W	
PCF-104		1967	United States	Patrol boat	Vietnam Unit Memorial Monument, Naval Amphibious Base Coronado; 32.671772°N 117.161378°W	
PCF-816		1968	United States	Patrol boat	Maritime Museum of San Diego, San Diego, California	
Pilot		1914	United States	Pilot boat	Maritime Museum of San Diego, San Diego, California	
PTF 26		1968	United States	Fast patrol boat	Maritime Pastoral Training Foundation, Golconda, Illinois	
USS Potomac		1934	United States	Presidential yacht	Jack London Square, Oakland, California	Franklin D. Roosevelt's presidential yacht
RMS Queen Mary		1934	United Kingdom	Ocean Liner	Long Beach	
Ralph J. Scott		1925	United States	Fireboat	California	
SS Red Oak Victory		1944	United States	Victory ship, Cargo ship	Richmond, California; 37.904806°N 122.364444°W	
Relief		1950	United States	Lightship	Oakland, California; 37.79569°N 122.28059°W	
Spindrift		1933	United States	Fishing vessel	Morro Bay Maritime Museum, Morro Bay, California	
Star of India		1863	United Kingdom	Barque	Maritime Museum of San Diego, San Diego, California	

Former

Ship	Country of preservation	Region of preservation	City of preservation	From	Year launched	Type	Fate	Remarks
Caritas	United States	California	Smith River	Germany	1925	Patrol yacht	Closed in 2012.	Remains in the same spot as of 2021.
Ningpo	United States	California	Catalina Harbor	China (Qing dynasty)	1753	Junk	Burned in 1938.	
Wapama	United States	California	Richmond	United States (United States)	1915	Steam schooner	Scrapped in 2015.	

=== Connecticut ===
See also List of submarine museums in the United States, which includes at least six in Connecticut

Ship	Image	Year launched	Origin	Type	Location	Notes
Annie		1880	United States	Sandbagger sloop	Mystic Seaport, Mystic, Connecticut; 41.36121°N 71.96496°W	
Breck Marshall		1987	United States	Catboat	Mystic Seaport, Mystic, Connecticut	
Brilliant		1932	United States	Auxiliary schooner	Mystic Seaport, Mystic, Connecticut	
Charles W. Morgan		1841	United States	Whaler	Mystic Seaport, Mystic, Connecticut 41.36222°N 71.96518°W	
Emma C. Berry		1866	United States	Sloop	Mystic Seaport, Mystic, Connecticut	
Fire Fighter		1938	United States	Fireboat	Mystic Seaport Museum, Mystic, Connecticut	
Florence		1926	United States	Western-rig dragger	Mystic Seaport, Mystic, Connecticut	
Gerda III		1928	Denmark	Lighthouse tender	Mystic Seaport, Mystic, Connecticut	
Joseph Conrad		1882	Denmark	Sailing ship	Mystic Seaport, Mystic, Connecticut; 41.36197°N 71.96627°W	
Kingston II		1937	United States	Harbor tug	Mystic Seaport, Mystic, Connecticut; 41.36017°N 71.96393°W	
L. A. Dunton		1921	United States	Schooner	Mystic Seaport, Mystic, Connecticut	
Nellie		1891	United States	Oyster sloop	Mystic Seaport, Mystic, Connecticut	
Sabino		1908	United States	Ferry	Mystic Seaport, Mystic, Connecticut; 41.36121°N 71.96496°W	
Star		1950	United States	Fishing vessel	Mystic Seaport, Mystic, Connecticut	
Regina M.		1900	United States	Carry-away sloop	Mystic Seaport, Mystic, Connecticut	
Roann		1947	United States	Eastern-rig dragger	Mystic Seaport, Mystic, Connecticut	

=== Florida ===
See also List of submarine museums in the United States, which includes at least one in Florida

Ship	Image	Year launched	Origin	Type	Location	Notes
SS American Victory		1945	United States	Cargo ship	American Victory Ship & Museum, Tampa, Florida; 27.94389°N 82.44417°W	
Deep Diver		1966	United States	Research submersible	Marine Sciences Center, Fort Pierce, Florida	
USCGC Ingham		1936	United States	Cutter	Key West, Florida; 24.55225°N 81.807694°W	
USS Orleck		1945	United States	Destroyer	Jacksonville, Florida; 30.32393°N 81.65659°W	Served in the US Navy from 1945 to 1982, sold to Turkey and renamed Yücetepe (D 345). Museum ship in Texas from 2000 until she was transferred to Jacksonville in 2022.
PTF 3		1962	United States	Fast patrol boat	DeLand Naval Air Station Museum, DeLand, Florida	

Former

Ship	Country of preservation	Region of preservation	City of preservation	From	Year launched	Type	Fate	Remarks
Huntington	United States	Florida	Palm Beach	United States	1933	Tugboat	Scrapped in 2010.	

=== Georgia ===
See also List of submarine museums in the United States, which includes at least one in Georgia

=== Hawaii ===
See also List of submarine museums in the United States, which includes at least two in Hawaii

Ship	Image	Year launched	Origin	Type	Location	Notes
USS Missouri		1944	United States	Battleship	Pearl Harbor, Hawaii; 21.36222°N 157.95333°W	Received Japanese surrender in 1945

Former

Ship	Image	Country of preservation	Region of preservation	City of preservation	From	Year launched	Type	Fate	Remarks
Carthaginian		United States	Hawaii	Lahaina, Hawaii	Denmark	1921	Schooner	Ran aground in 1972, later scrapped.	
Carthaginian II		United States	Hawaii	Lahaina, Hawaii	Sweden	1920	Schooner	Sunk as an artificial reef in 2005.	
Falls of Clyde		United States	Hawaii	Honolulu, Hawaii; 21.30569°N 157.865°W	United Kingdom	1878	Oil tanker clipper ship	Scuttled on 15 October 2025.	

=== Idaho ===
See also List of submarine museums in the United States, which includes at least one in Idaho

=== Illinois ===
See also List of submarine museums in the United States, which includes at least one in Illinois

=== Indiana ===
See also List of submarine museums in the United States, which includes at least one in Indiana

Ship	Image	Year launched	Origin	Type	Location	Notes
USS LST-325		1942	United States	Landing Ship, Tank	Evansville, Indiana; 37.97288°N 87.58042°W	

=== Iowa ===
Ship	Image	Year launched	Origin	Type	Location	Notes
George M. Verity		1927	United States	Towboat	Keokuk, Iowa; 40.39039°N 91.37986°W	
Lone Star		1868	United States	Towboat	Buffalo Bill Museum, LeClaire, Iowa 41.598303°N 90.342556°W	
Sergeant Floyd		1932	United States	Towboat	Sioux City Public Museum, Sioux City, Iowa; 42.49117°N 96.41861°W	
William M. Black		1934	United States	Dredger	National Mississippi River Museum & Aquarium, Dubuque, Iowa; 42.49556°N 90.66222°W	

=== Louisiana ===
See also List of submarine museums in the United States, which includes at least one in Louisiana

Ship	Image	Year launched	Origin	Type	Location	Notes
USS Kidd		1943	United States	Destroyer	USS Kidd Veterans Museum, Baton Rouge, Louisiana; 30.44431°N 91.19151°W	
PT-305		1943	United States	PT Boat	The National WWII Museum, New Orleans, Louisiana; 30.04082°N 90.01317°W	Operational

=== Maine ===
See also List of submarine museums in the United States, which includes at least two in Maine

=== Maryland ===
See also List of submarine museums in the United States, which includes at least one in Maryland

Ship	Image	Year launched	Origin	Type	Location	Notes
Baltimore		1906	United States	Tugboat	Baltimore Museum of Industry, Maryland; 39.27420°N 76.60136°W	
Chesapeake (LV116)		1930	United States	Lightvessel	Historic Ships in Baltimore, Baltimore, Maryland	
USS Constellation		1854	United States	Sloop	U.S.S. Constellation Museum, Inner Harbor, Baltimore, Maryland; 39.285528°N 76.611194°W	
SS John W. Brown		1942	United States	Cargo ship	Canton Pier 13, 4601 Newgate Avenue, Baltimore, Maryland; 39.25972°N 76.55611°W	
NS Savannah		1959	United States	Nuclear merchant ship	Canton Marine Terminal, Baltimore, Maryland; 39.25847°N 76.55542°W	
USCGC Taney		1935	United States	Cutter	Inner Harbor of Baltimore	Formerly USCGC Taney

=== Massachusetts ===
See also List of submarine museums in the United States, which includes at least one in Massachusetts

Ship	Image	Year launched	Origin	Type	Location	Notes
USS Cassin Young		1943	United States	Destroyer	Boston National Historical Park, Boston, Massachusetts; 42.37222°N 71.05444°W	
CG 36500		1946	United States	Lifeboat	Orleans Historical Society, Orleans, Massachusetts; 41.79944°N 70.00889°W	
USS Constitution		1797	United States	Frigate	USS Constitution Museum, Charlestown Navy Yard, Charleston, Boston, Massachusetts; 42°22′20.9″N 71°3′23.6″W	Oldest commissioned warship still afloat. In active service.
Effie M. Morrissey		1894	United States	Schooner	New Bedford Whaling National Historical Park, New Bedford, Massachusetts	
USS Joseph P. Kennedy Jr.		1945	United States	Destroyer	Battleship Cove, Fall River, Massachusetts	
USS Massachusetts		1941	United States	Battleship	Battleship Cove, Fall River, Massachusetts	
Nantucket (LV-112)		1936	United States	Lightvessel	Boston, Massachusetts	
Nantucket (WLV-612)		1950	United States	Lightvessel	Boston Harbor, Boston, Massachusetts	
PT-617		1945	United States	PT Boat	PT Boat Museum, Fall River, Massachusetts; 41.70528°N 71.16333°W	Sole surviving PT boat of the most combat-tested type (ELCO 80-foot, same as the famous PT-109 of JFK)
PT-796		1945	United States	PT Boat	Battleship Cove, Fall River, Massachusetts	
USS Salem		1943	United States	Heavy cruiser	United States Naval Shipbuilding Museum, Quincy, Massachusetts; 42.24417°N 70.97°W	
Victura		1932	United States	Sailboat	John F. Kennedy Presidential Library and Museum, Columbia Point, Boston, Massachusetts; 42.31623°N 71.03345°W	

Former

Ship	Country of preservation	Region of preservation	City of preservation	From	Year launched	Type	Fate	Remarks
Hiddensee	United States	Massachusetts	Fall River	East Germany	1984	Corvette	Scrapped in October 2023.	

=== Michigan ===
See also List of submarine museums in the United States, which includes at least two in Michigan

Ship	Image	Year launched	Origin	Type	Location	Notes
USCGC Acacia		1944	United States	USCG seagoing buoy tender	SPSSCOMNHL, Manistee, Michigan; 44.25929°N 86.31548°W	
SS City of Milwaukee		1931	United States	Railroad Car Ferry	SPSSCOMNHL, Manistee, Michigan; 44.25941°N 86.31506°W	
USS Edson		1958	United States	Destroyer	Saginaw Valley Naval Ship Museum, Bay City, Michigan; 43.61389°N 83.86889°W	
Evelyn S		1939	United States	Fish tug	Michigan Maritime Museum, South Haven, Michigan; 42.405967°N 86.275131°W	
Huron		1920	United States	Lightvessel	Port Huron, Michigan; 42.98917°N 82.42667°W	List of lightvessel museums in the United States
Katherine V		1928	United States	Fish tug	Besser Museum for Northeast Michigan try Besser Museum, Alpena, Michigan; 45°4′53″N 83°26′57″W	
USS LST-393		1942	United States	Landing Ship, Tank	Muskegon, Michigan; 43.23461°N 86.25893°W	
USCGC Mackinaw		1943	United States	Icebreaker	Icebreaker Mackinaw Maritime Museum, Mackinaw City, Michigan; 45.77969°N 84.71987°W	
Milwaukee Clipper		1905	United States	Passenger Steamer	Pennsylvania Railroad??, Muskegon, Michigan; 43.22194°N 86.29583°W	
SS Valley Camp		1917	United States	Bulk freighter	Sault Ste. Marie, Michigan; 46.49917°N 84.33639°W	
Wilhelm Baum		1923	United States	Tugboat	Michigan Maritime Museum, South Haven, Michigan; 42.40661°N 86.27384°W	Restored tugboat at a maritime museum having numerous small boats and a replica Tall Ship.

Former

Ship	Image	Location of preservation	From	Year launched	Type	Fate	Remarks
Alvin Clark		Menominee, Michigan	United States	1846 or 1847	Schooner	Demolished in 1994	Delisted from the National Register of Historic Places on June 10, 2020
USCGC Bramble		Port Huron, Michigan	United States	1943	Cutter/Buoy tender	Scrapped in Gibson, Louisiana in 2023.	Was a museum ship at Port Huron Museum from after 2003 decommissioning until closed to the public in 2011.
USCGC McLane		Muskegon, Michigan	United States	1927	Cutter	Sold for scrap in 2025	Was a museum ship at USS Silversides Museum from after 1993 to 2025.

=== Minnesota ===
Ship	Image	Year launched	Origin	Type	Location	Notes
Bayfield		1953	United States	Tugboat	Lake Superior Maritime Visitor Center, Duluth, Minnesota; 46.779852°N 92.09202°W	
Crusader II		1939	United States	Fish tug	Knife River Heritage & Cultural Center, Knife River, Minnesota	
SS William A. Irvin		1938	United States	Lake freighter	Duluth Entertainment Convention Center, Duluth, Minnesota; 46.78278°N 92.09722°W	

Former

Ship	Image	Year launched	Origin	Type	Location	Notes
Lake Superior		1943	United States	Tugboat	Duluth, Minnesota; 46.781874°N 92.096764°W	Museum ship from 1996 to 2007. Sold off and remains unused in Duluth.
USCGC Sundew		1942	United States	USCG Seagoing Buoy Tender	Duluth, Minnesota; 46.77633°N 92.10444°W	Sold to private owners in 2021

=== Mississippi ===
Ship	Image	Year launched	Origin	Type	Location	Notes
USS Cairo		1862	United States	Gunboat	Vicksburg National Military Park, Vicksburg, Mississippi; 32.37583°N 90.86667°W	

Former

Ship	Country of preservation	Region of preservation	City of preservation	From	Year launched	Type	Fate	Remarks
Sprague	United States	Mississippi	Vicksburg	United States	1902	Towboat	Destroyed by fire in 1974.	

=== Missouri ===
Ship	Image	Year launched	Origin	Type	Location	Notes
USS Aries		1981	United States	Hydrofoil	USS Aries PHM-5 Hydrofoil Memorial, Brunswick, Missouri; 38.67083°N 91.55278°W	
H.T. Pott Towboat		1933	United States	Towboat	National Museum of Transportation	first Missouri River towboat with a welded steel hull instead of a riveted hull.

Former

Ship	Country of preservation	Region of preservation	City of preservation	From	Year launched	Type	Fate	Remarks
USS Inaugural	United States	Missouri	St. Louis	United States	1944	Minesweeper	Sank in the Great Flood of 1993.	Wreck remains visible as of 2021.

=== Nebraska ===
See also List of submarine museums in the United States, which includes at least two in Nebraska

Ship	Image	Year launched	Origin	Type	Location	Notes
Captain Meriwether Lewis		1931	United States	Dredger	Museum of Missouri River History, Nebraska; 40.39472°N 95.65056°W	
USS Hazard		1944	United States	Minesweeper	Freedom Park, East Omaha, Omaha, Nebraska; 41.27694°N 95.90167°W	National Historic Landmark

=== New Hampshire ===
See also List of submarine museums in the United States, which includes at least one in New Hampshire

=== New Jersey ===
See also List of submarine museums in the United States, which includes at least five in New Jersey

Ship	Image	Year launched	Origin	Type	Location	Notes
USS New Jersey		1942	United States	Battleship	Camden, New Jersey; 39.93917°N 75.13278°W	NRHP (2004)

=== New Mexico ===
See also List of submarine museums in the United States, which includes at least one in New Mexico

=== New York ===
See also List of submarine museums in the United States, which includes at least three in New York

Ship	Image	Year launched	Origin	Type	Location	Notes
Ambrose (LV-87)		1907	United States	Lightvessel	South Street Seaport, New York City; 40.70484°N 74.00247°W	
Chancellor		1938	United States	Tugboat	Waterford Maritime Historical Society, Lock 3, Erie Canal, Waterford, New York; 42°47′44.5″N 73°41′15.6″W	
Christeen		1883	United States	Oyster sloop	Oyster Bay, New York; 40.87774°N 73.539702°W	In active service as a Living museum
Day Peckinpaugh		1921	United States	Canal motorship	Matton Shipyard, Cohoes, New York; 42.778611°N 73.68°W	
Derrick Boat No. 8		1927	United States	Floating derrick	H. Lee White Marine Museum, Oswego, New York; 43.46167°N 76.51611°W	
Frying Pan		1929	United States	Lightvessel	North River Pier 66, Manhattan, New York City	
USS Intrepid		1943	United States	Aircraft carrier	Intrepid Sea, Air & Space Museum, New York City; 40.7648°N 74.001°W	
John D. McKean		1954	United States	Fireboat	Grassy Point, Stony Point, New York; 41.22553°N 73.96491°W	Has not opened as a museum.
John J. Harvey		1931	United States	Fireboat	North River Pier 66, New York City	
Kestrel		1892	United States	Steam yacht	George C. Boldt Yacht House, Heart Island, Alexandria, New York; 44.346389°N 75.926944°W	
Lehigh Valley Railroad Barge No. 79		1914	United States	Railroad car float	Waterfront Museum, 290 Conover Street, Brooklyn, New York	
Lettie G. Howard		1893	United States	Schooner	South Street Seaport, New York City	
USCGC Lilac		1933	United States	Lighthouse tender	Pier 25, Hudson River Park, New York City	
USS Little Rock		1943	United States	Light cruiser	Buffalo and Erie County Naval & Military Park, Buffalo, New York; 42.87761°N 78.88089°W	
Major Elisha K. Henson		1943	United States	Tugboat	H. Lee White Marine Museum, Oswego, New York	U.S. Army tug at D-Day landings
Mary A. Whalen		1938	United States	Oil tanker	Red Hook, Brooklyn, New York	
Modesty		1923	United States	Sloop	Long Island Maritime Museum, West Sayville, New York; 40°43′21.92″N 73°5′44.72″W	
Overfalls		1938	United States	Lightvessel	Overfalls Maritime Museum Foundation	
Pioneer		1885	United States	Schooner	South Street Seaport, New York City; 40.7047°N 74.0025°W	
Priscilla		1888	United States	Sloop	Long Island Maritime Museum, West Sayville, New York	
PT-48		1941	United States	PT Boat	Fleet Obsolete, Kingston, NY	
PT-459		1943	United States	PT Boat	Fleet Obsolete, Kingston, NY	
PT-486		1943	United States	PT Boat	Fleet Obsolete, Kingston, NY	
PT-615		1945	United States	PT Boat	Fleet Obsolete, Kingston, NY	
PTF-17		1968	United States	Fast patrol boat	Buffalo and Erie County Naval & Military Park, New York	
Sherman Zwicker		1942	Canada	Schooner	Hudson River Park Pier 25, New York City; 40.72030°N 74.01607°W	
USS Slater		1944	United States	Destroyer escort	Albany, New York; 42.642944°N 73.749528°W	
USS The Sullivans		1945	United States	Destroyer	Buffalo and Erie County Naval & Military Park, Buffalo, New York; 42.8777°N 78.8806°W	
USS Ticonderoga		1814	United States	Schooner	Whitehall, New York; 43.55512°N 73.40222°W	
Urger		1901	United States	Canal tugboat	Waterford Maritime Historical Society, Waterford, New York; 42.79639°N 73.6875°W	
Wavertree		1885	United Kingdom	Full-rigged ship	South Street Seaport, New York City; 40.70556°N 74.00278°W	
W. O. Decker		1930	United States	Tugboat	South Street Seaport, New York City; 40.70528°N 74.00306°W	

=== North Carolina ===
Ship	Image	Year launched	Origin	Type	Location	Notes
CSS Neuse		1864	Confederate States of America	Ironclad	CSS Neuse and Governor Caswell Memorial, 100 N. Queen St., Kinston, North Carolina; 35.26041°N 77.58144°W	
USS North Carolina		1940	United States	Battleship	Wilmington, North Carolina; 34°14′11″N 77°57′15″W	

=== Ohio ===
See also List of submarine museums in the United States, which includes at least one in Ohio

Ship	Image	Year launched	Origin	Type	Location	Notes
SS Col. James M. Schoonmaker		1911	United States	Bulk freighter	National Museum of the Great Lakes, Toledo, Ohio	
Dorothea M. Geary		1915	United States	Tugboat	Ashtabula Maritime & Surface Transportation Museum, Ashtabula, Ohio	
Ohio		1903	United States	Tugboat	National Museum of the Great Lakes, Toledo, Ohio	
PT-728		1945	United States	PT boat	Liberty Aviation Museum, Port Clinton, Ohio	
SS William G. Mather		1925	United States	Bulk freighter	Great Lakes Science Center, Cleveland, Ohio; 41.50931°N 81.69808°W	
W. P. Snyder Jr.		1918	United States	Towboat	Ohio River Museum, Marietta, Ohio; 39.42028°N 81.46333°W	

Former

Ship	Country of preservation	Region of preservation	City of preservation	From	Year launched	Type	Fate	Remarks
Majestic	United States	Ohio	New Richmond	United States	1923	Showboat	Closed in 2022	Currently moored in Greenup, Kentucky

=== Oklahoma ===
See also List of submarine museums in the United States, which includes at least one in Oklahoma

=== Oregon ===
See also List of submarine museums in the United States, which includes at least one in Oregon

Ship	Image	Year launched	Origin	Type	Location	Notes
USS LCI(L)-713		1944	United States	Landing Craft Infantry	Amphibious Forces Memorial Museum, 1401 N Hayden Island Drive, Portland, Oregon; 45°36′56″N 122°40′45″W	
Portland		1947	United States	Steam tug	Oregon Maritime Museum, Portland, Oregon; 45.52014°N 122.66977°W	
PT-658		1945	United States	PT Boat	Portland, Oregon; 45.570389°N 122.720444°W	Operational

Former

Ship	Country of preservation	Region of preservation	City of preservation	From	Year launched	Type	Fate	Remarks
USS Oregon	United States	Oregon	Portland	United States	1893	Battleship	Preserved in Portland from 1925 to 1942. Stripped down to a barge in 1943. Scrapped in 1956.	Some parts were preserved.
USS Banning	United States	Oregon	Hood River	United States	1944	Patrol craft	Museum ship at Hood River from 1961 to 1969. Returned to Navy custody in 1969. Sunk in 1973.	

=== Pennsylvania ===
See also List of submarine museums in the United States, which includes at least two in Pennsylvania

Ship	Image	Year launched	Origin	Type	Location	Notes
Gazela		1901	Kingdom of Portugal	Barkentine	Philadelphia, Pennsylvania; 39.944742°N 75.139996°W	
USS Olympia		1892	United States	Protected cruiser	Independence Seaport Museum, Philadelphia, Pennsylvania	
Jupiter		1902	United States	Tugboat	Philadelphia, Pennsylvania	

Former

Ship	Country of preservation	Region of preservation	City of preservation	From	Year launched	Type	Fate	Remarks
USS Lawrence	United States	Pennsylvania	Philadelphia	United States	1813	Brig	Destroyed by fire in 1876.	

=== Rhode Island ===
Ship	Image	Year launched	Origin	Type	Location	Notes
Coronet		1885	United States	Yacht	Newport, Rhode Island; 41°28′54″N 71°19′0″W	

=== South Carolina ===
See also List of submarine museums in the United States, which includes at least three in South Carolina

Ship	Image	Year launched	Origin	Type	Location	Notes
USS Laffey		1943	United States	Destroyer	Patriots Point, Mount Pleasant, South Carolina; 32.78972°N 79.90778°W	
USS Yorktown		1943	United States	Aircraft carrier	Patriots Point, Mount Pleasant, South Carolina; 32.79056°N 79.90861°W	

=== Texas ===
See also List of submarine museums in the United States, which includes at least four in Texas

Ship	Image	Year launched	Origin	Type	Location	Notes
Elissa		1877	United States	Barque	Texas Seaport Museum, Galveston, Texas; 29.30944°N 94.79361°W	
USS Lexington		1942	United States	Aircraft carrier	Corpus Christi, Texas; 27.815°N 97.388611°W	
PT-309		1943	United States	PT Boat	National Museum of the Pacific War, Fredericksburg, Texas	
USS Stewart		1942	United States	Destroyer escort	Seawolf Park, Pelican Island, Galveston, Texas	
USS Texas		1912	United States	Battleship	Galveston, Texas	

=== Vermont ===
Ship	Image	Year launched	Origin	Type	Location	Notes
Ticonderoga		1906	United States	Steamboat	Shelburne Museum, Vermont	

=== Virginia ===
Ship	Image	Year launched	Origin	Type	Location	Notes
Portsmouth (LV101)		1915	United States	Lightvessel	Portsmouth, Virginia	
USS Wisconsin		1943	United States	Battleship	Norfolk, Virginia; 36.84833°N 76.29528°W	

=== Washington D.C. ===
See also List of submarine museums in the United States, which includes at least two in Washington, D.C.

Ship	Image	Year launched	Origin	Type	Location	Notes
PCF-1		1965	United States	Patrol boat	National Museum of the United States Navy, Washington D.C.	
USS Philadelphia		1776	United States	Gunboat gondola	U.S. National Museum of American History (Washington, DC)	Sunk in Lake Champlain in the Battle of Valcour Island

=== Washington ===
See also List of submarine museums in the United States, which includes at least six in Washington

Ship	Image	Year launched	Origin	Type	Location	Notes
Arthur Foss		1889	United States	Tugboat	Northwest Seaport, Seattle, Washington; 47.62806°N 122.33694°W	
Duwamish		1909	United States	Fireboat	Museum of History & Industry, South Lake Union, Seattle, Washington; 47.62818°N 122.33652°W	
Equator		1888	United States	Pygmy trading schooner, then tugboat	Everett, Washington; 48.003889°N 122.218056°W	Carried Robert Louis Stevenson, future author of Treasure Island.
Sand Man		1910	United States	Tugboat	Olympia, Washington	
Fireboat No. 1		1929	United States	Fireboat	Tacoma, Washington; 47.28230°N 122.48041°W	National Historic Landmark
Swiftsure (LV-83)		1904	United States	Lightvessel	Northwest Seaport, Seattle, Washington; 47.62814°N 122.33687°W	
USS Turner Joy		1958	United States	Destroyer	US Naval Destroyer Museum, Bremerton, Washington; 47.56389°N 122.62194°W	
Virginia V		1922	United States	Steamboat	Lake Union Park, Seattle, Washington; 47.62828°N 122.33681°W	
W. T. Preston		1929	United States	Dredger	Anacortes, Washington; 48.51611°N 122.60917°W	
USCGC Comanche		1944	United States	Fleet tug	Puget Sound, Washington	In active service as a Living museum
MV Lotus		1909	United States	Houseboat	Center for Wooden Boats, Washington	

=== Wisconsin ===
See also List of submarine museums in the United States, which includes at least one in Wisconsin

Ship	Image	Year launched	Origin	Type	Location	Notes
CG 41410		1977	United States	Utility boat	Door County Maritime Museum, Sturgeon Bay, Wisconsin	
Hope		1930	United States	Fish tug	Door County Maritime Museum, Gills Rock, Wisconsin	
John Purves		1919	United States	Tugboat	Door County Maritime Museum, Wisconsin	
Lottie Cooper		1876	United States	Schooner	Deland Park, Sheboygan, Wisconsin	
Ludington		1943	United States	Tugboat	Kewaunee, Wisconsin; 44.46°N 87.501667°W	U.S. Army tug at D-Day
SS Meteor		1896	United States	Steamer	Superior, Wisconsin; 46.723172°N 92.062936°W	Only surviving whaleback steamer.

=== Former United States museum ships ===
Former United States museum ships

Ship	Country of preservation	Region of preservation	City of preservation	From	Year launched	Type	Fate	Remarks
USS Barry	United States	Washington, D.C.	Washington Navy Yard	United States	1955	Destroyer	Removed from display in 2015, scrapped 2022.	
USCGC Comanche	United States	South Carolina	Mount Pleasant	United States	1934	Cutter	Sunk as an artificial reef in 1992.	
USCGC Mohawk	United States	Florida	Key West	United States	1934	Cutter	Sunk as artificial reef in 2012.	File:USCGC Mohawk (WPG-78) sm3.jpg
Seguin	United States	Maine	Bath	United States	1884	Tugboat	Scrapped in the 1970s or mid to early 1980s.	Some parts remain in storage at the Maine Maritime Museum.
Wawona	United States	California	Seattle	United States (United States)	1897	Schooner	Dismantled between 2008 and 2009.	

== See also ==
- List of Great Lakes museum and historic ships
- List of lightships of the United States
- List of maritime museums in the United States
- List of museum ships of the United States military
- Barcelona Charter
- List of ancient ships
- List of classic vessels
- List of oldest surviving ships
- Ship replica
- Ships preserved in museums
- Viking ship replica
