= Warren Landing =

Warren Landing may refer to:

- Warren Landing, Manitoba, a village in Canada
- Warren Landing Lower Range Lights, a navigational aid
- Warren Landing Upper Range Lights, a navigational aid
