= CG 30615 =

Surf Rescue Boat built in 1983

Coordinates: 35.37049°N 120.85544°W

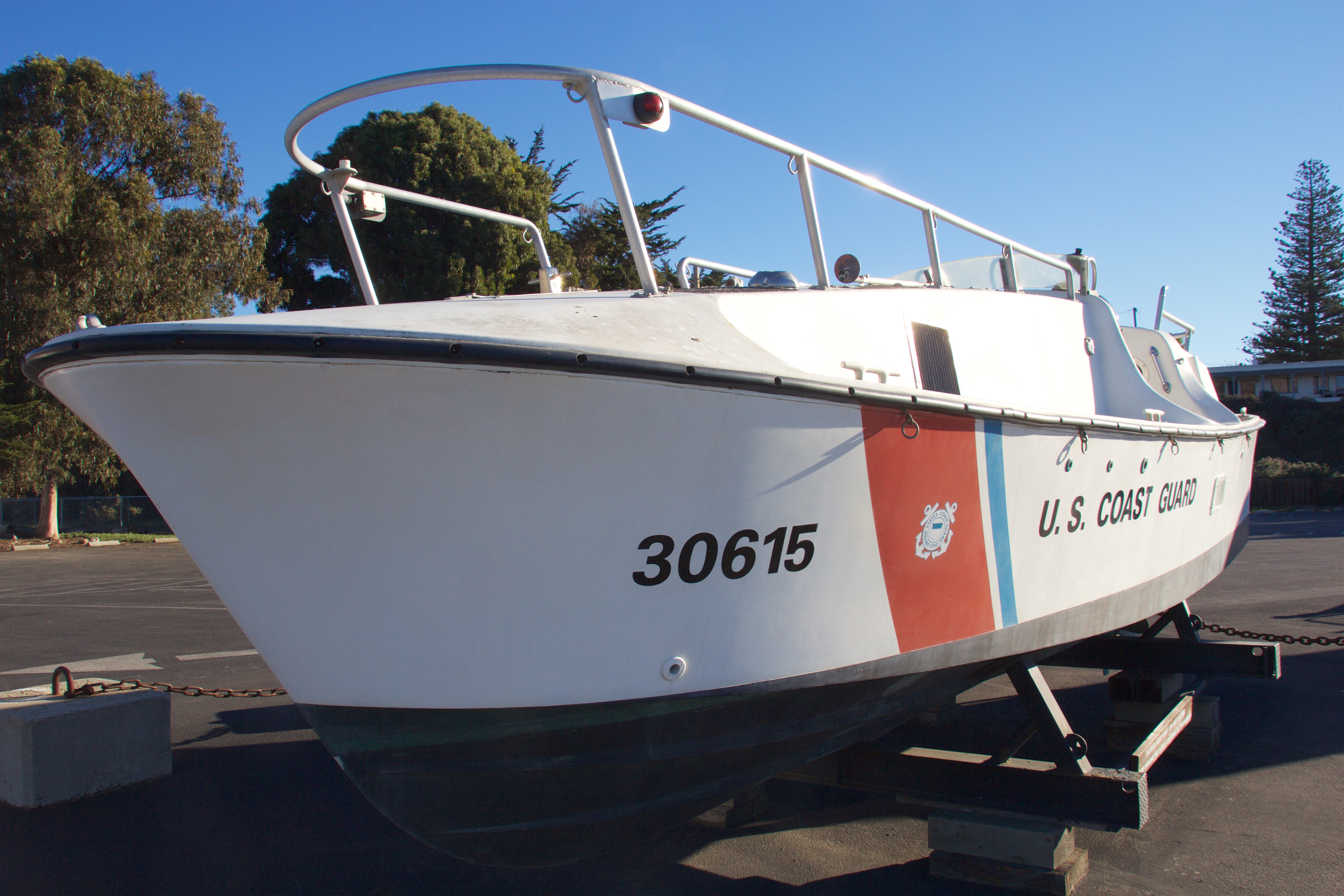
- USCG surf rescue boat CG-30615 at Morro Bay Maritime Museum

History

United States
- Name: CG 30615
- Owner: 1983–1996: United States Coast Guard; 1996–present Morro Bay Maritime Museum
- Builder: Willard Boat Company, Fountain Valley, California
- Completed: 1983
- In service: 1983–1996
- Status: Museum ship at Morro Bay Maritime Museum in Morro Bay, California.

General characteristics
- Type: Surf rescue boat
- Displacement: 11,000 lb (5,000 kg)
- Length: 30.5 ft (9.3 m)
- Beam: 9.3 ft (2.8 m)
- Draft: 3.5 ft (1.1 m)
- Speed: 31 knots (57 km/h; 36 mph)

USCG surf rescue boat CG-30615 is a United States Coast Guard surf rescue boat preserved as a museum ship at the Morro Bay Maritime Museum in Morro Bay, California. CG 30615 was built in 1983 by the Willard Boat Company at Fountain Valley, California. CG 30615 is small surf rescue boat, built out of wood. The United States Coast Guard had her built a cost of $113,000. This type of boat, a 30' surf rescue boat, was built from 1980 to 1990. She started operating out of Morro Bay in 1996, after working in the Gulf Coast and the Pacific Northwest. To operate in the rough surf zone the boat is self-bailing and self-righting. The boat as a range of 130 nautical miles (240 km; 150 mi).

Willard Boat Company opened in 1961 and is now located in Costa Mesa, California, building trawlers and yachts.

== Sister ships ==
- CG 36515 at Humboldt Bay Maritime Museum
- CG 30609 at Westport Maritime Museum in Westport, Washington
- Coast Guard Motor Lifeboat CG 36500

== See also ==
- List of museum ships in North America
- Angels Gate (tugboat)
