= Evelyn S (tugboat) =

Tugboat built in 1939

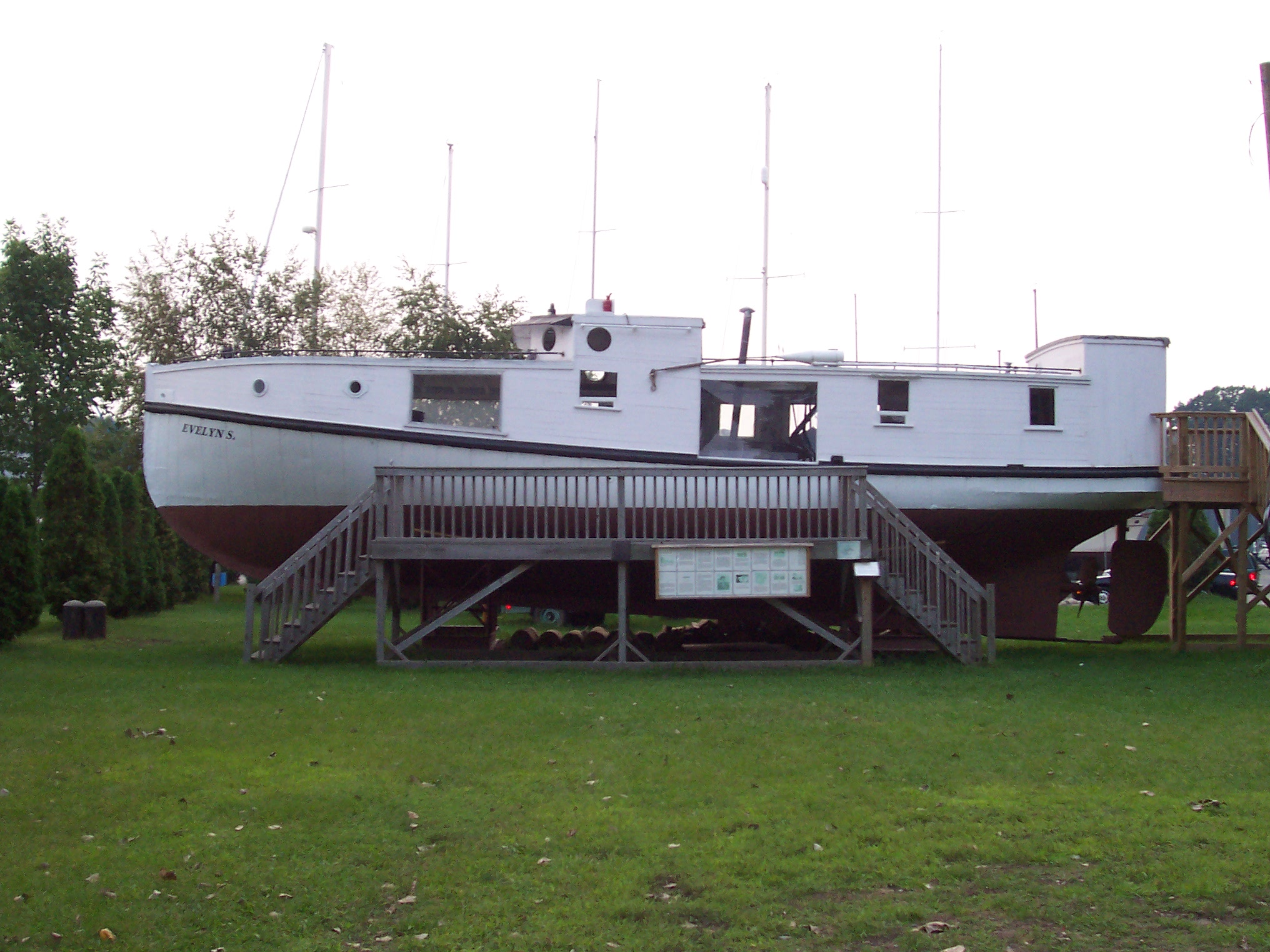
- Fishing tug Evelyn S in 2021 at Michigan Maritime Museum

History
- Owner: 1939 - 1943 Sellman Fisheries in Manistique, Michigan; 1943 - 1952 Anderson Fish Company in Frankfort, Michigan; 1952 - 1966 Walter Nichols in New Era, Michigan fishing; 1966 - 1974 Capek Towing & Salvage Company in Whitehall, Michigan; 1974 - 1982 Rowland L. Sylvester of South Haven, Michigan (for the Museum); 1982 - current Michigan Maritime Museum
- Builder: Sturgeon Bay Boat Works
- Completed: 1939
- Status: Museum ship at Michigan Maritime Museum, South Haven, Michigan

General characteristics
- Type: Fish tug
- Displacement: 30 Gross tons (Net 20T)
- Length: 50 ft (15 m)
- Beam: 13 ft (4.0 m)
- Depth: 6 ft (1.8 m)
- Installed power: 90 horsepower
- Propulsion: 3-cylinder Kahlenburg diesel engine
- Speed: 10 knots

Evelyn S
- Location: 260 Dyckman Avenue, South Haven, Michigan, United States 49090
- Coordinates: 42.40645°N 86.27395°W

Evelyn S is Fish tug / Tugboat museum ship at the Michigan Maritime Museum, South Haven, Michigan. Evelyn S was built in 1939 Sturgeon Bay Boat Works for William Sellman Fisheries in Manistique, Michigan. Evelyn S is a small wooden gill net fish tug design. To protect the boat from frozen waters of Lake Michigan, the Evelyn S. is sheathed in 3/16" welded steel plates. The keel, stem, and deadwood cover in 1/2" iron plate. She has a keel and hull made of white oak. The superstructure made of white-oak frames and sided with cedar planks. She is powered by a 3-cylinder Kahlenberg diesel engine, built by Kahlenberg Brothers Company of Two Rivers, Wisconsin. The tug has a fully enclosed deck, sometimes called a turtle back design, to protect fisherman from the freezing waters of the Great Lakes.

== History ==
Owners:

- 1939 - 1943 Sellman Fisheries in Manistique of Manistique, Michigan, owner William Sellman
- 1943 - 1952 Anderson Fish Company in Frankfort, Michigan, owner Charles Anderson
- 1952 - 1966 Walter Nichols (1930-2003) of New Era, Michigan fishing
- 1966 - 1974 Capek Towing & Salvage Company in Whitehall, Michigan, owner Richard Capek of Wyoming, Michigan
- 1974 - 1982 Rowland L. Sylvester of South Haven, Michigan (for the Museum)
- 1982 - current Michigan Maritime Museum

In August 1976, South Haven’s Bicentennial Committee put on the South Haven's first maritime festival. At the maritime festival the Evelyn S put on a tug-of-war event, on the Black River, against another South Haven fish tug named Elsie J. The Evelyn S was captained by Don Nichols. Evelyn S is one of many ships at the Michigan Maritime Museum including: Norwegian Fishing Trawler Jacoba and the wood hull Fish Tug Esther.
The Evelyn S sank at her dock in Black River in 13' of water on January 26, 1985, freezing weather thought to be the cause. Evelyn S was raised and refloated on January 30 by a crane of Olson Brothers Contractors of South Haven. She was taken to All Seasons Marine Inc. for repair. On return she has been on a stand display at the Museum. In 1986, restoration work started on Evelyn S by volunteers and museum staff, completed in 2005. In 2014, restoration work was done to the roof, deck planking, and frames. A new display stand was opened in 2016. In 2021 a walk thru display opened on the Evelyn S.

== See also ==
- List of museum ships in North America
- Angels Gate (tugboat)
