= Spindrift (ship) =

Museum ship built in 1933

Coordinates: 35.37049°N 120.85544°W

History
- Owner: Morro Bay Maritime Museum
- Builder: Beviacqua Brothers Genoa Boat Works, San Francisco
- Completed: 1933
- Status: Museum ship at Morro Bay Maritime Museum in Morro Bay, California.

General characteristics
- Class & type: Monterey style fishing boat
- Type: Mediterranean Felucca Boat
- Length: 28 ft (8.5 m)
- Beam: 9 ft (2.7 m)
- Draft: 3 ft (0.91 m)
- Installed power: 101 hp
- Propulsion: marine diesel engine 3-cylinder, 2-cycle engine
- Crew: 1 or 2

Spindrift is California commercial fishing museum ship at the Morro Bay Maritime Museum in Morro Bay, California.

== History ==
Spindrift was built in 1933 in San Francisco by the Beviacqua Brothers Genoa Boat Works near Fisherman's Wharf. Spindrift is Monterey style boat, built out of wood, with sawn oak frames and Port Orford Cedar planks. She latest engine install is a 3-cylinder, 2-cycle engine marine diesel engine with 101 hp. Spindrift is in need or restoration and plans are to have her restore her. Very few of these early Monterey style boat remain. Monterey style boat were built and use from the 1920 to 1960. The Monterey style boat is a type after the Mediterranean Felucca Boats that were 28 ft (8.5 m) long, but a few up to 60 ft (18 m). The Spindrift is next to the Alma tugboat at the Morro Bay Maritime Museum, both being built by the Beviacqua Brothers Genoa Boat Works.

Genoa Boat Works in San Francisco, California in 1927, where Alma was built

== See also ==
- Monterey clipper
- List of museum ships in North America
- Angels Gate (tugboat)
