= Michigan Maritime Museum =

Museum and research library located in South Haven, Michigan

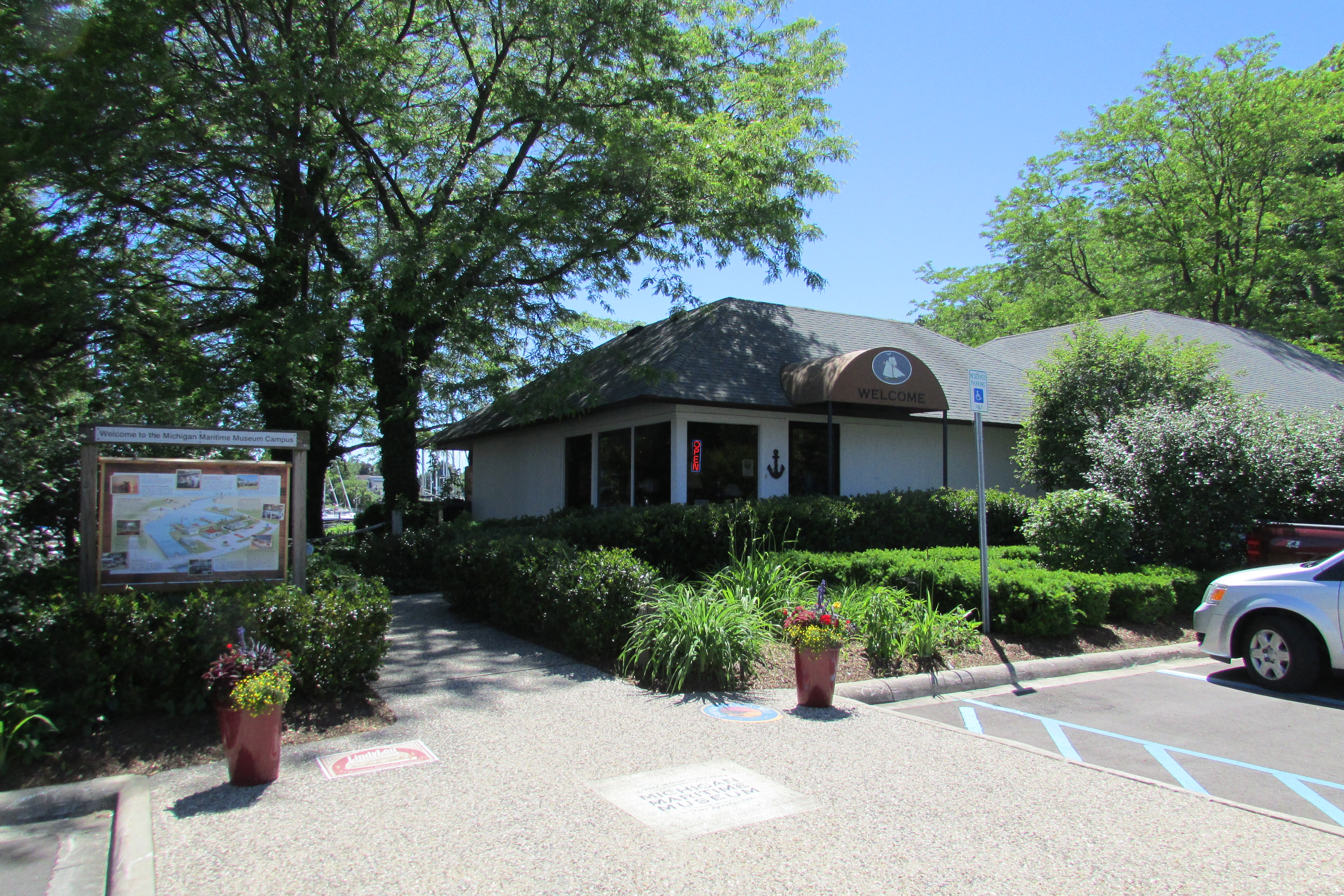
- Entranceway to the museum in 2016
- Location: 260 Dyckman Avenue, South Haven, Michigan, United States 49090
- Coordinates: 42.40645°N 86.27395°W

The Michigan Maritime Museum is a museum and research library located in South Haven in the U.S. state of Michigan. The museum is located next to the Dyckman Avenue bascule bridge on the Black River just in from Lake Michigan, the second-largest by volume of the five Great Lakes. The museum specializes in the maritime history of the state of Michigan and the lake of the same name.

== Description ==
The Michigan Maritime Museum includes five buildings for the display, interpretation, repair, and preservation of Michigan's maritime heritage.

Visitors can often take rides on a 2004-reconstructed War of 1812-era topsail sloop used in the North American fur trade, the 47-ton Friends Good Will. A seamanship training course is offered to members who, upon completion, may join its crew and sail during May to September.

Four other ships and boats make up the rest of the museum's on-water fleet. On static display outside are the restored 1923 tugboat Wilhelm Baum, donated in 2016, and the Evelyn S., a 1939-built 50 feet (15 m) wooden gill net fish tug. Several smaller boats are displayed inside.

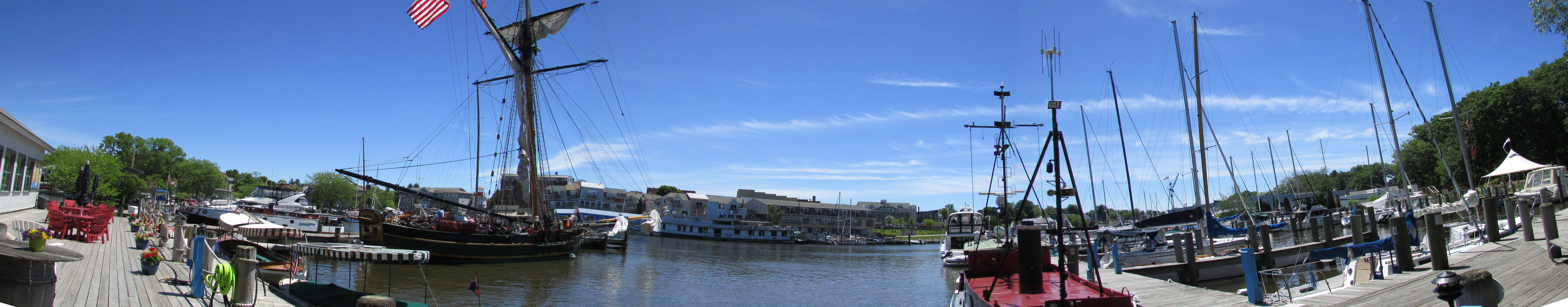
Dockside panorama view in 2016

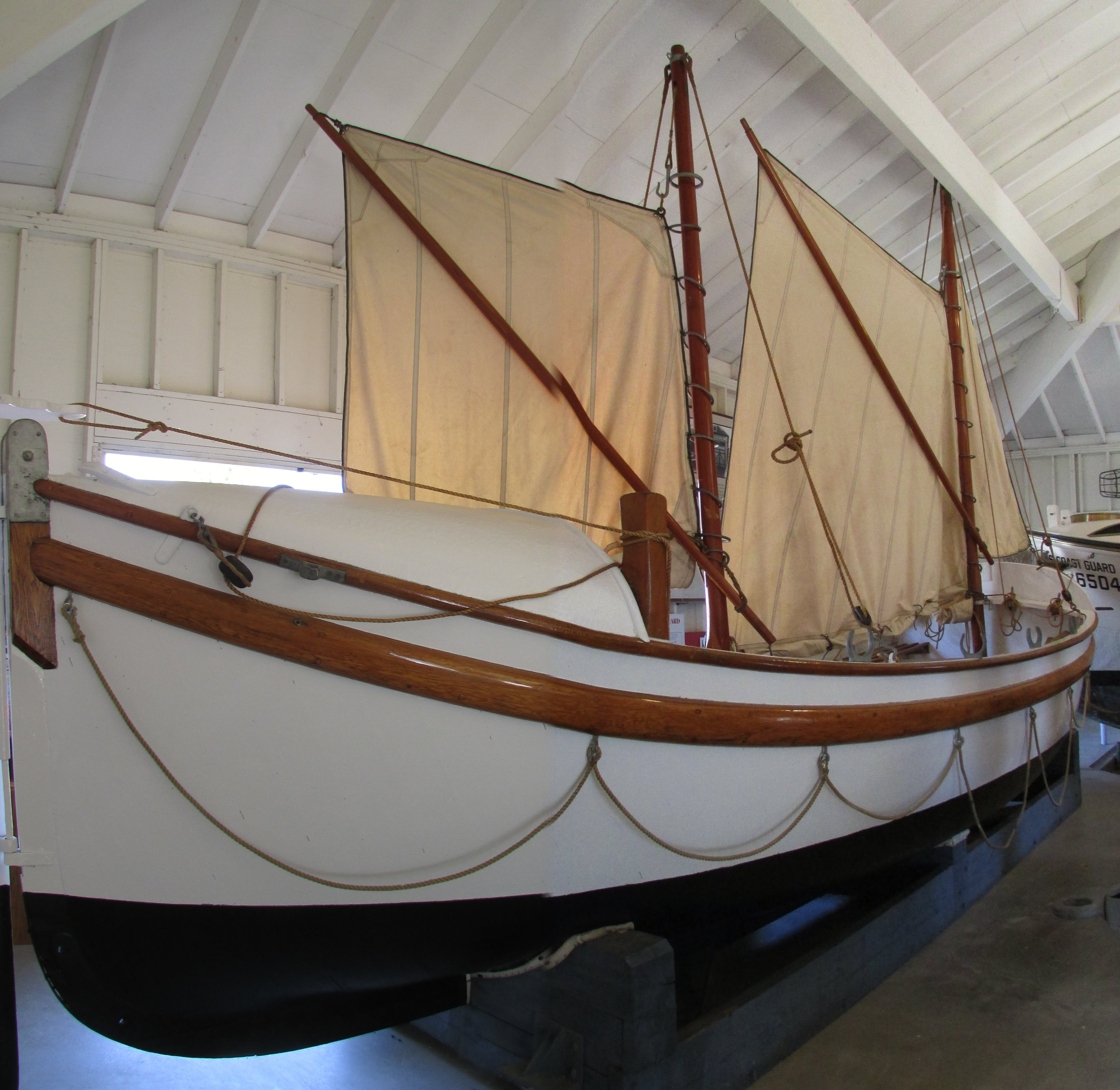
A "pulling surfboat" on display

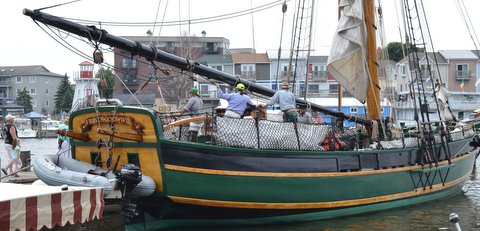
Friends Good Will, the museum's tallest ship

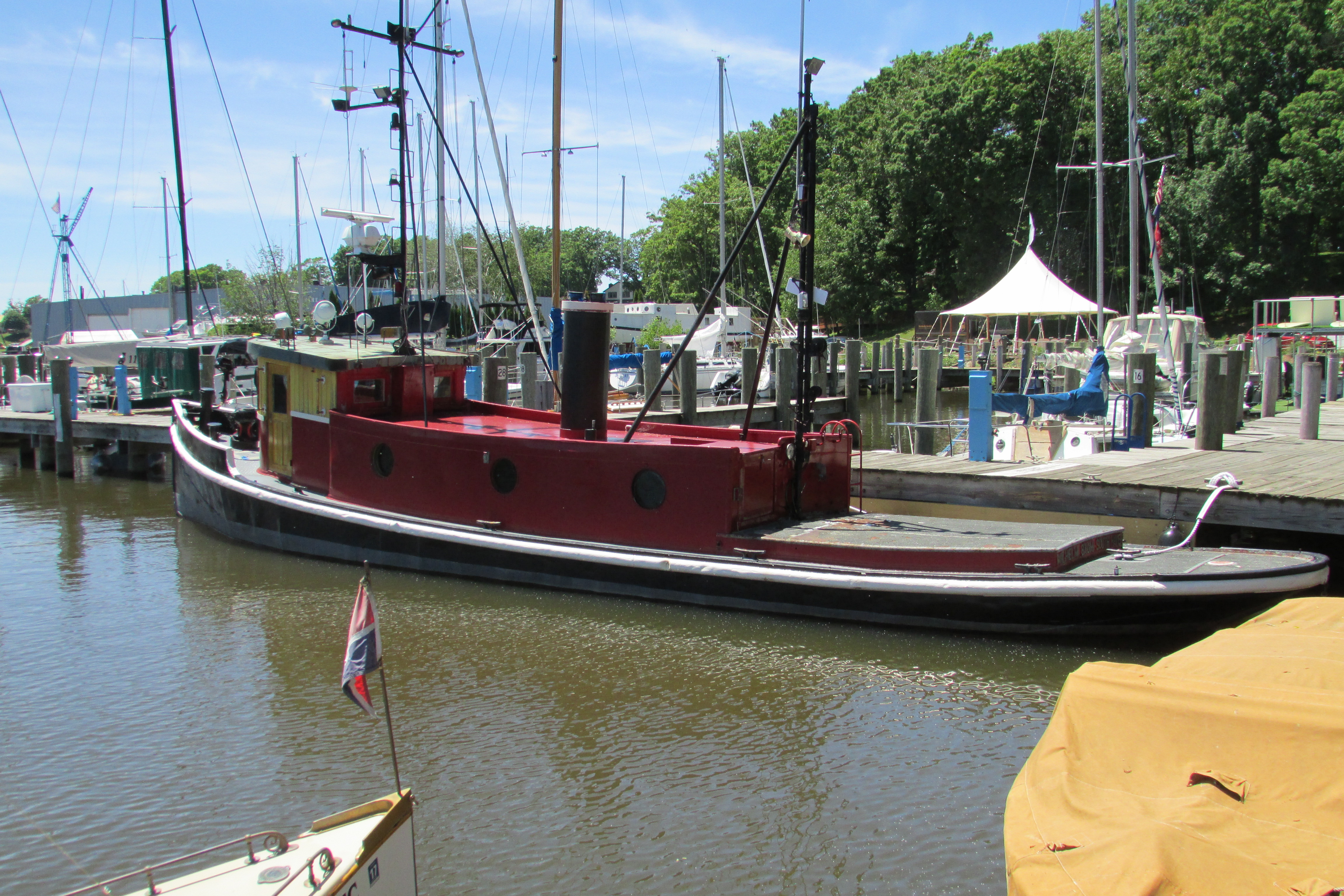
Wilhelm Baum tugboat

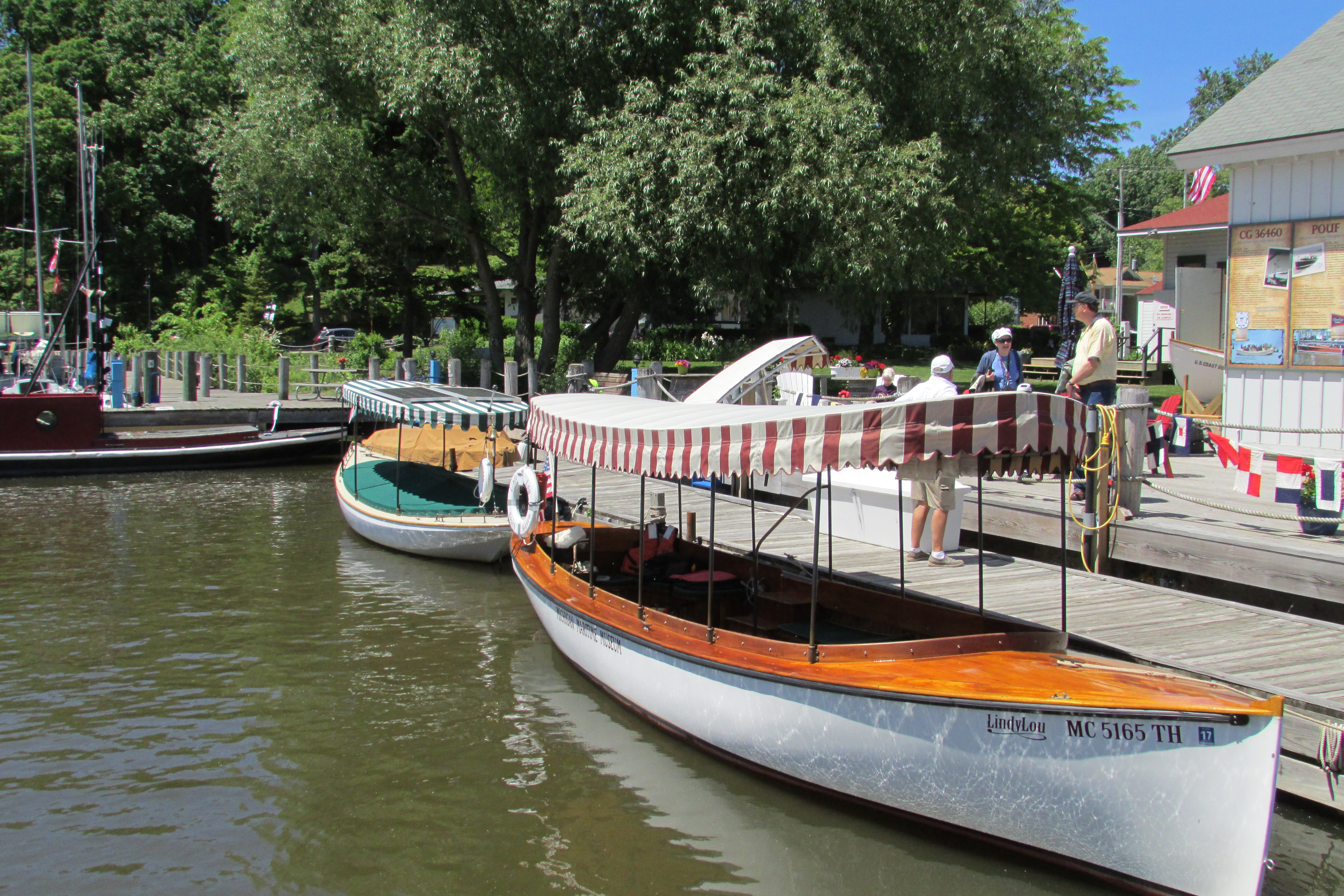
Lindy Lou excursion boat

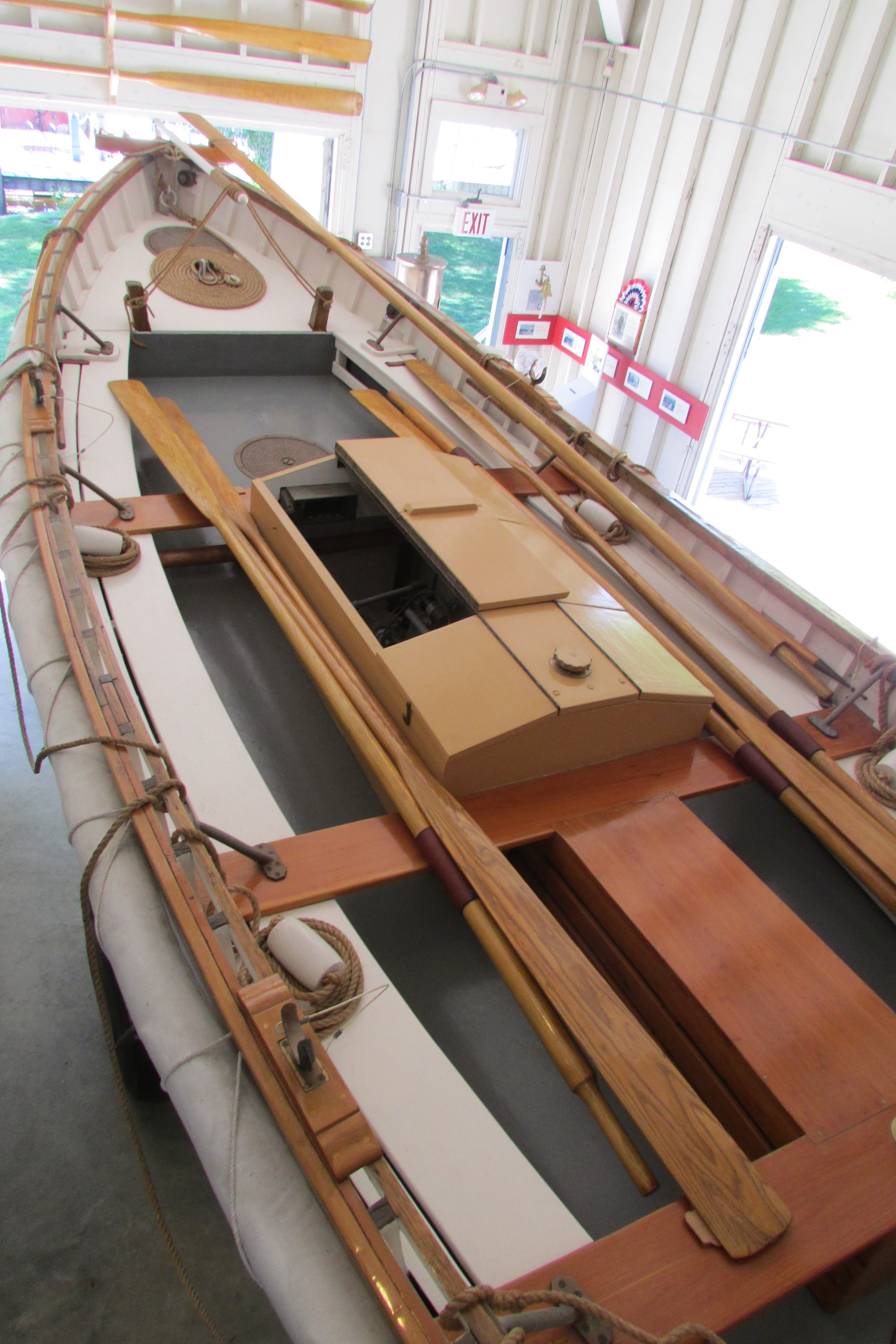
26' motor surfboat

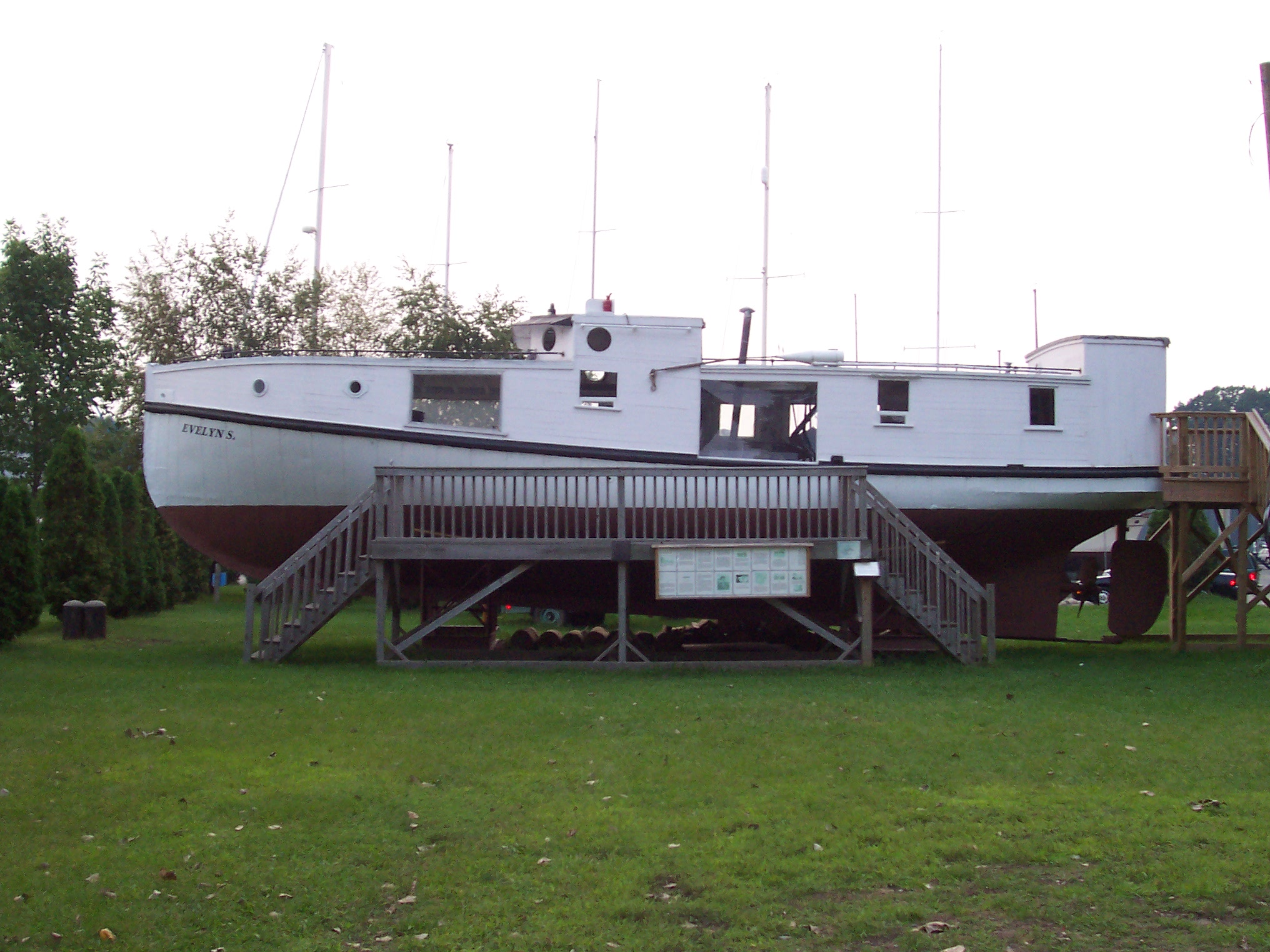
Evelyn S. fishing tug

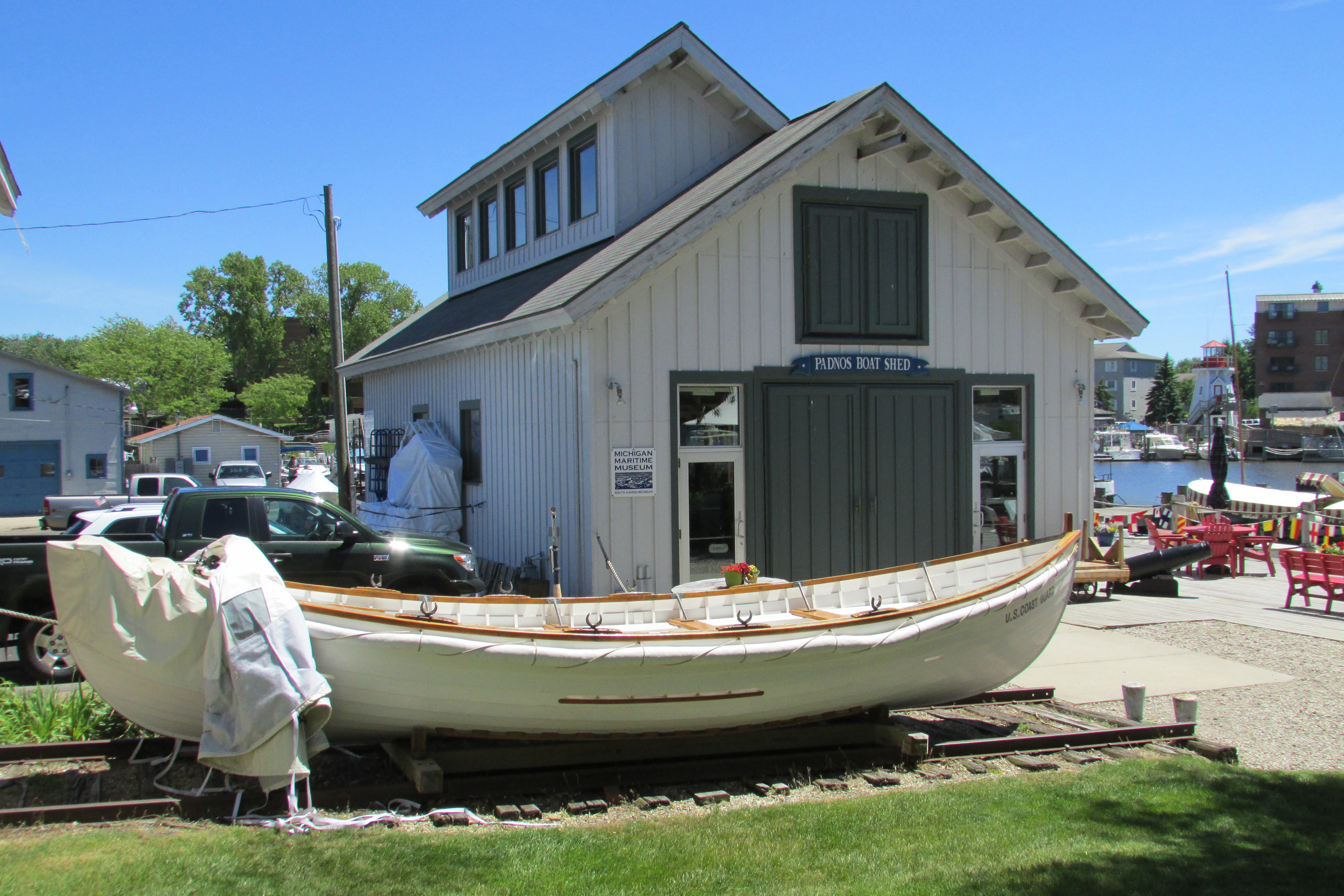
a U.S. Coast Guard rescue dinghy in front of the Padnos Boat Shed

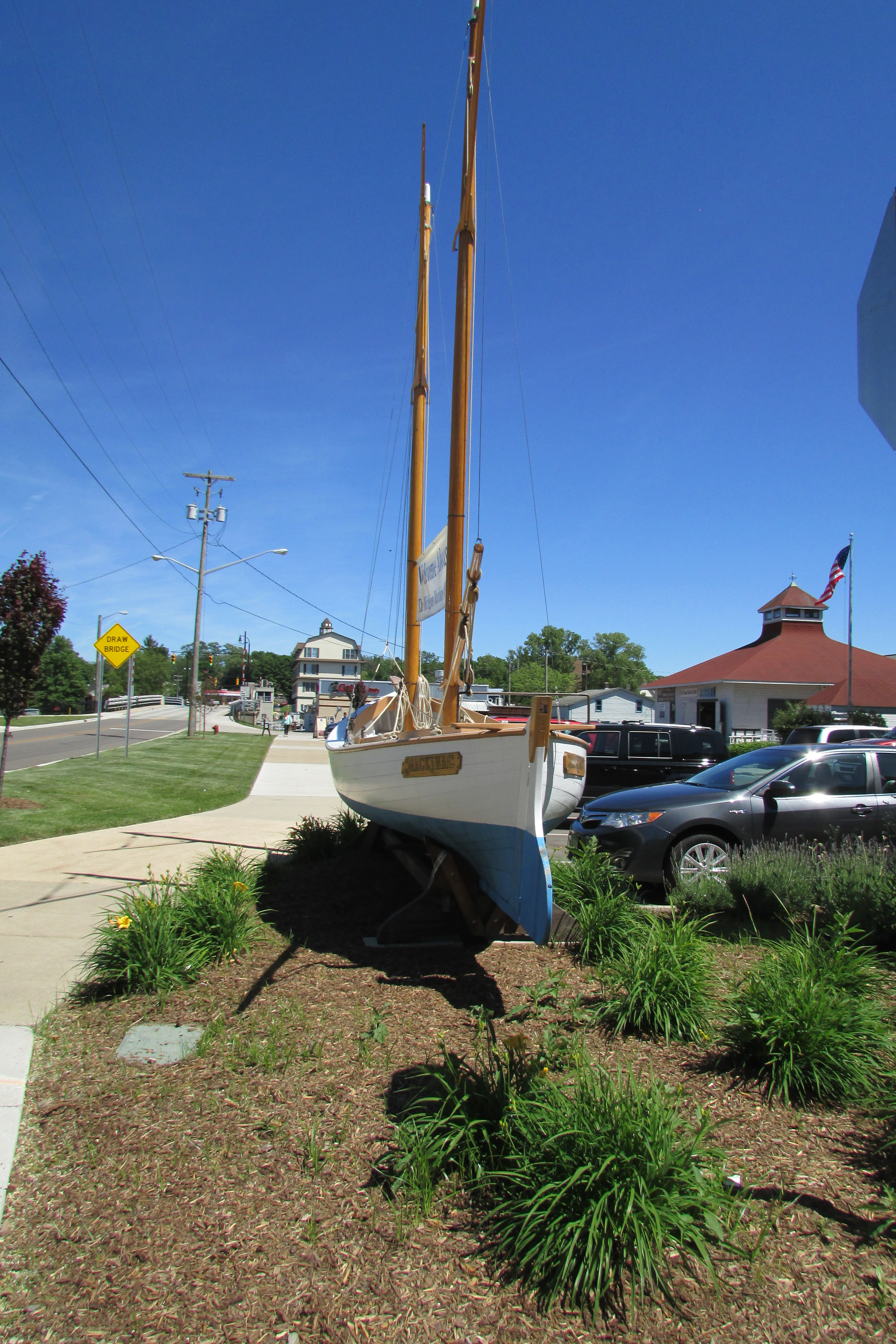
a boat out front on Dyckman St. in 2016

== See also ==
- List of maritime museums in the United States
- List of museum ships in the United States
