= Marine Museum of Manitoba =

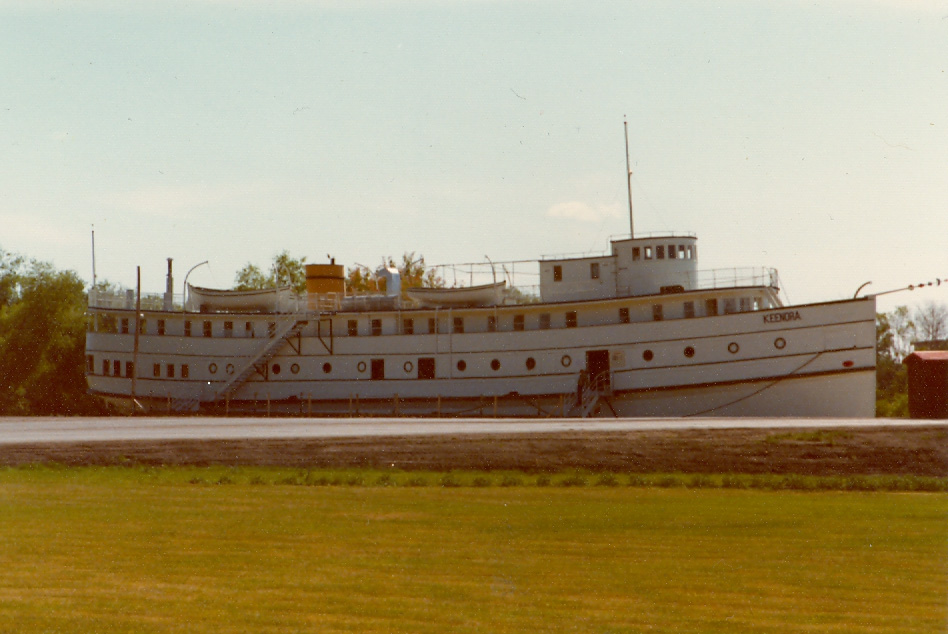
- Established: 1972
- Location: Selkirk, Manitoba
- Coordinates: 50.1465°N 96.8652°W
- Type: Naval museum
- Website: www.marinemuseum.ca

The Marine Museum of Manitoba, at Selkirk, Manitoba, was established in 1972 to gather ships, artifacts, and items relating to shipping, to tell the story of the development and the operation of transportation on Lake Winnipeg and the Red River. The period covered by the museum's displays starts circa 1850 and continues to present day.

The Marine Museum is a non-profit organization operated by a board of local citizens operating under the name of The Marine Museum of Manitoba (Selkirk) Inc. With support from the City of Selkirk and nearby businesses, as well as from both the provincial and federal government, the museum's purpose is to collect, preserve, research, exhibit and interpret its collection of historical artifacts.

The Motor Ship Keenora, built in 1897, is the oldest preserved steamboat in Manitoba. It was the first acquired by the museum. Abandoned in the Selkirk Slough in 1966, the MS Keenora was purchased from Marine Transport Navigation Company in 1972, by a group of twenty Selkirk businessmen. In the summer of 1973 the Keenora was removed from the waters of the Red River on the Selkirk dry dock (marine railway), then dragged on its keel, across the grass of Selkirk Park, to its present location, near the park entrance. The Keenora opened to the public on weekends beginning October 20, 1973.

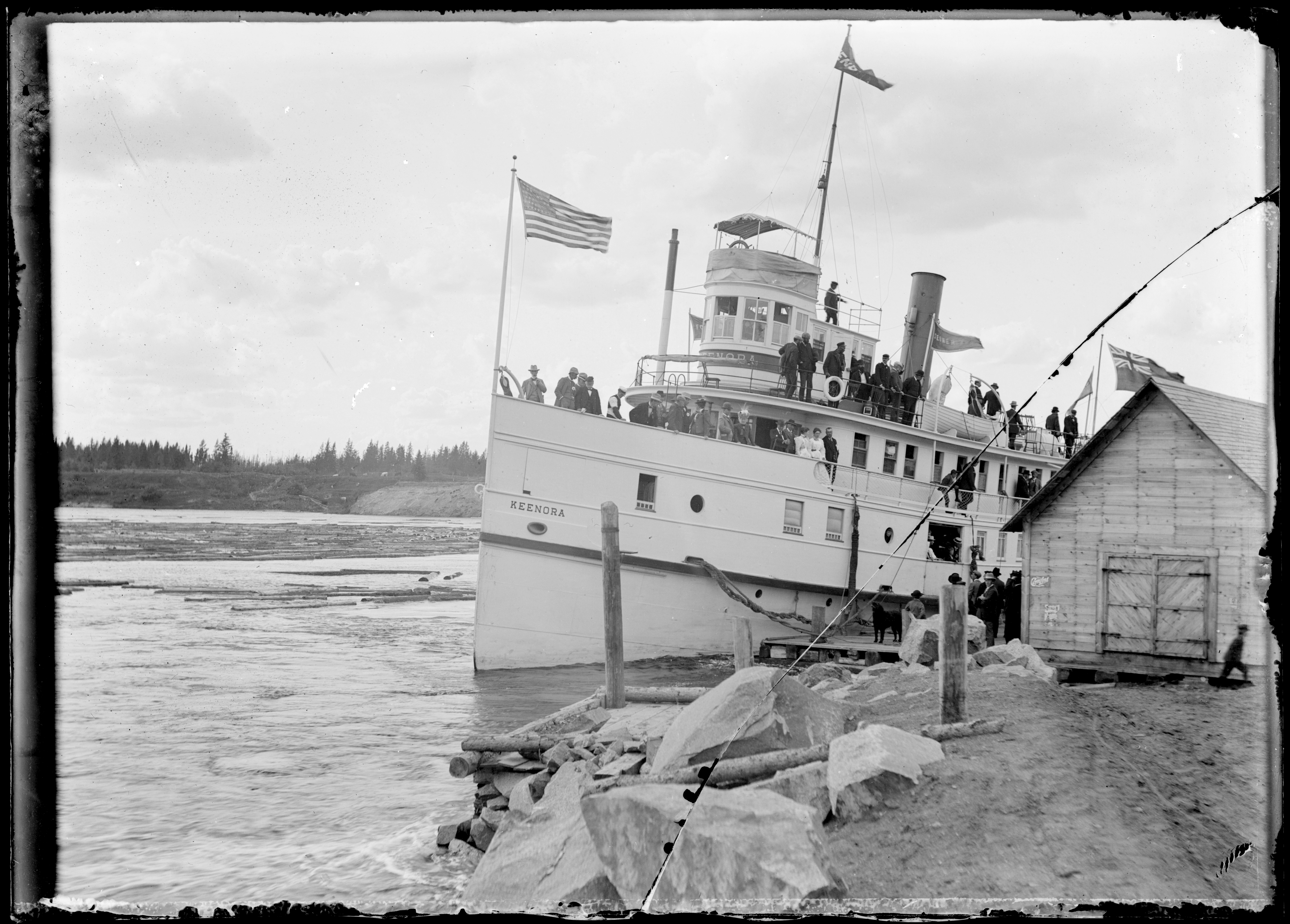
Steamship "Keenora" at port, in Rainy River District, Ontario (c.1905)

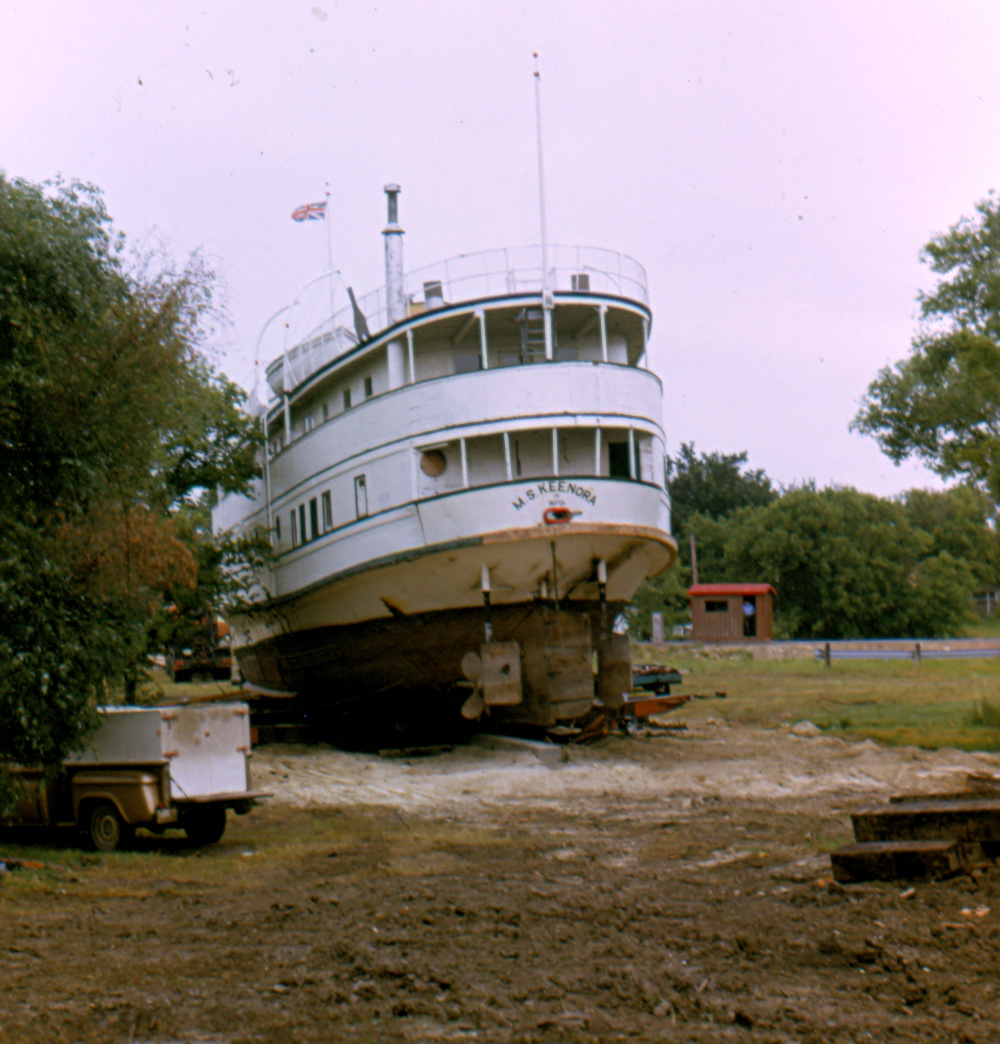
the "last run" of the MS Keenora, being dragged into position at Selkirk Park (1973)

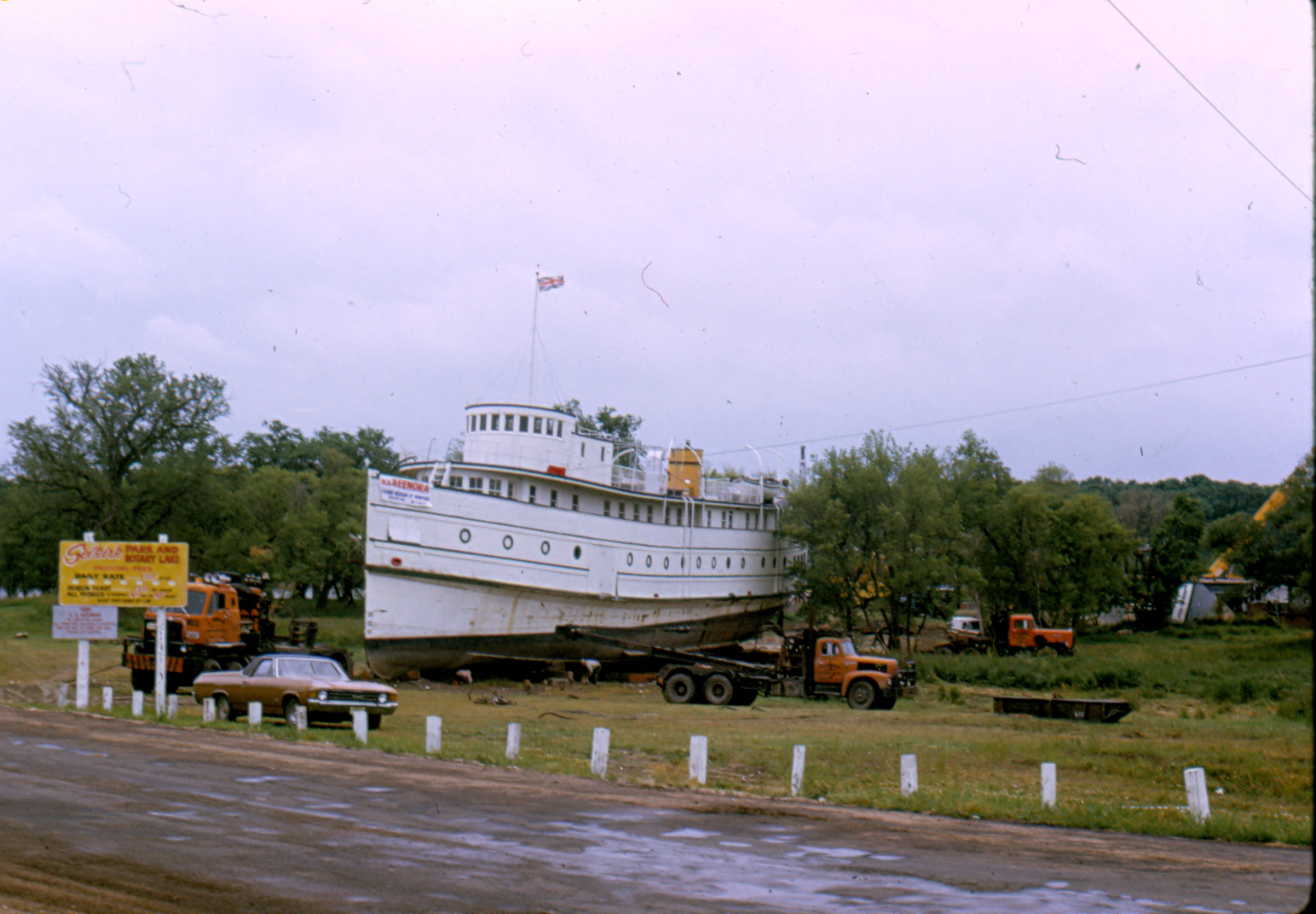
the "last run," MS Keenora arrives at museum site Selkirk Park (1973)

== Ships ==
The museum has at least six stationary vessel exhibits:

Ship	Image	Built	Notes
SS Keenora		1897	Steamship built for passenger and cargo traffic along the Ontario's Lake of the Woods. Later dismantled, transported by rail to Winnipeg, and rebuilt to serve traffic on Lake Winnipeg and the Red River.
CGS Bradbury		1915	Ice breaker owned by the federal government
M/S Chickama II		1942	Small steamboat which could navigate the shallow Nelson River and Playgreen Lake north from Lake Winnipeg, where the SS Keenora could not. Passengers and freight were transferred at Warren Landing, at the north end of Lake Winnipeg, then were carried by Chickama II as far as Norway House. Also served as a barge tug.
M/S Lady Canadian		1944	Fish freighter originally owned by Canadian Fish Products. Built by the Purvis Company in 1944, and rebuilt by Riverton Boat works in 1963. Later used by Manitoba Hydro as a survey ship.
M/S Peguis II		1955	A barge tug
M/S Joe Simpson		1963	Vessel which replaced M/S Chickama II

== Affiliations ==
The museum is affiliated with: Canadian Museums Association, Canadian Heritage Information Network, and Virtual Museum of Canada.

== See also ==
- List of museum ships
