= SS Keenora =

Canadian steamboat

Coordinates: 50.146430°N 96.864925°W

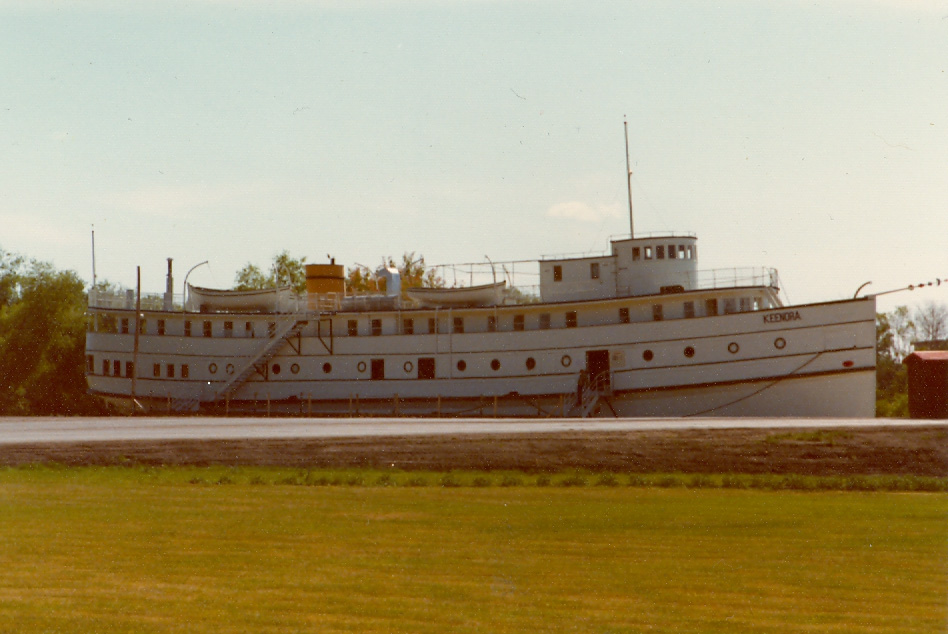
- Keenora at Marine Museum of Manitoba

History

Canada
- Name: Keenora
- Laid down: 1896
- Launched: 1897
- In service: 1897–1917; 1923–1966
- Out of service: 1966
- Status: Museum ship since 1973

General characteristics
- Length: 158 ft (48 m)
- Speed: 15 knots (28 km/h; 17 mph)

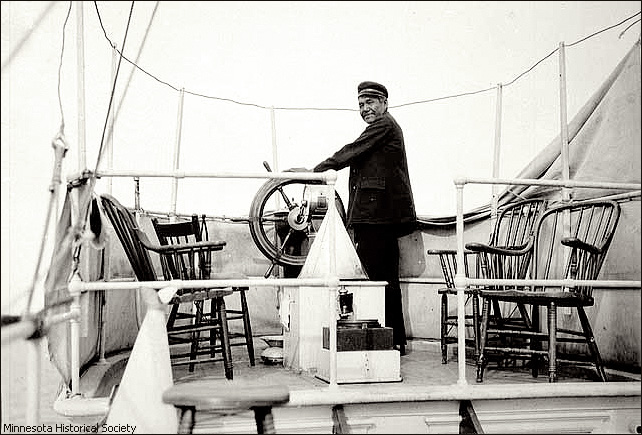
First Nations pilot on the steamship Keenora, Lake of the Woods

SS Keenora is a steamboat on Lake Winnipeg. The vessel began operations on Lake of the Woods in Ontario, where from she was transported to Winnipeg, Manitoba and rebuilt. Retired in the 1960s, Keenora is the centrepiece of collection at the Marine Museum of Manitoba in Selkirk, Manitoba.

== History ==
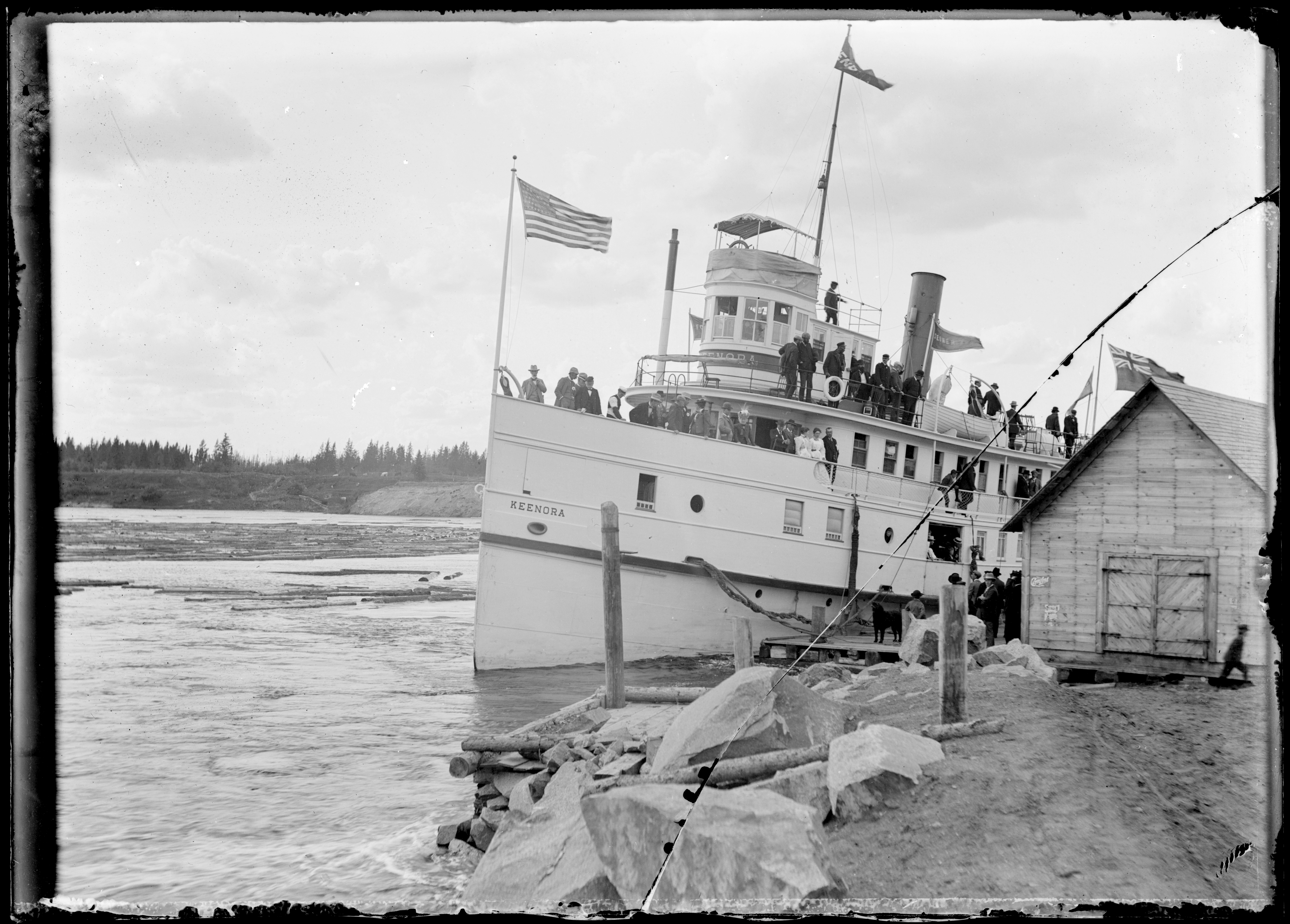
SS Keenora, Rainy River District, photograph taken between 1900–1909.

The steamboat Keenora was built in 1897 for passenger and cargo traffic along the Ontario's Lake of the Woods, where she ran successfully for over a decade, serving isolated communities on the lake as distant as Rainy River. When the Ontario and Rainy River Railway was built in 1901 traffic volumes began to decline, following the takeover of this railway by Canadian Northern Railway in 1915, the vessel was sold to a consortium of Winnipeg lawyers. Keenora was dismantled and transported in sections to Winnipeg on railroad flatcars in 1917.

Once reassembled in Winnipeg, she received an additional 30-foot (9.1 m) extension to her hull, increasing her overall length to 158 feet (48 m). For a season the ship served as a floating dance hall in downtown Winnipeg, but was later assigned to cargo and passenger traffic on Lake Winnipeg and the Red River. A total of 65 passenger cabins were constructed, and a new machinery was installed. The machinery guaranteed a speed of 15 knots (28 km/h; 17 mph).

The regular route started from Winnipeg, with a turnaround point located at the northern end of Lake Winnipeg, at Warren Landing on the Big Mossy Point. From Warren Landing the passengers and cargo were transferred to a smaller steamboat, which covered the last 30 kilometres (19 mi) to Norway House. Keenora was too large to enter the shallow Nelson River.

Keenora's career ended in the 1960s when she could not meet the new maritime regulations. At first the ship was destined to be scrapped, but was salvaged to be the cornerstone of Marine Museum of Manitoba's collections.
