= 30' surf rescue boat =

Lifeboat used by the USCG

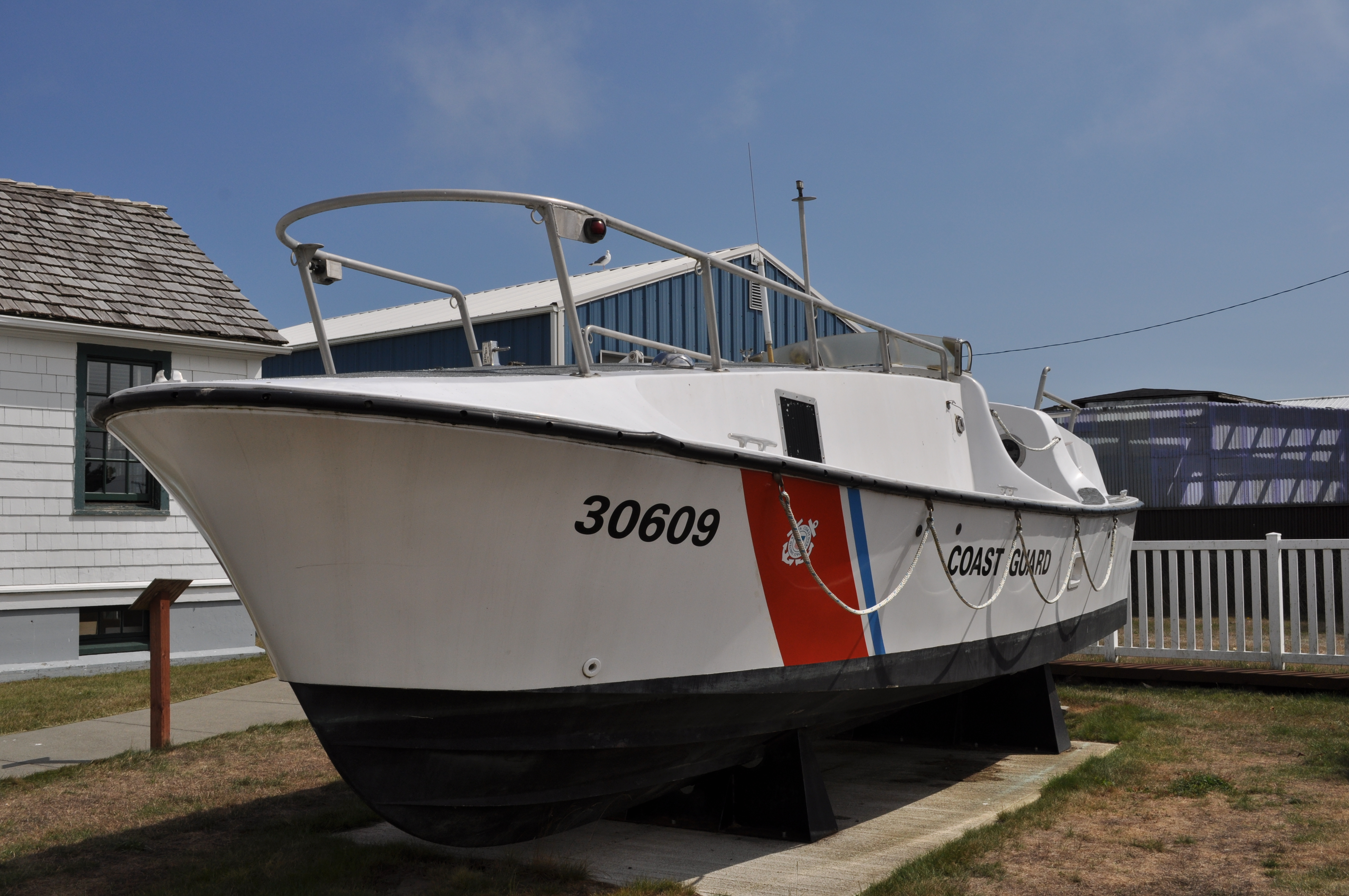
Umpqua Siuslaw River CG-30609 surf rescue boat. Built by Willard Company, in Fountain Valley, California in 1982. On display at Westport Maritime Museum, Westport, Washington.

The 30 foot surf rescue boat is a lifeboat that the United States Coast Guard has used in recent years. The 30' long boat is designated the surf rescue boat (SRB) and was introduced in 1983.

== Design ==
The 30' SRB was self-righting and self baling and designed with marked differences from the typical lifeboats used by the Coast Guard up until the early 1980s. The 30' SRB is not considered to be a Motor Lifeboat (MLB), but was generally used in a similar capacity. Designed to perform search and rescue in adverse weather and surf the first 30' SRB was built by the Willard Boat Company in Fountain Valley, California. Much of the 30 footer's design centered on speed. The sides of the hull are made of 5/8" Airex foam cored fiberglass reinforced plastic (FRP), and the bottom of the hull is constructed of solid FRP molded in one piece. The boat is 30' 4" in length with a 9' 4" beam, and weighs a total of 11,500 lb (5,200 kg) when fully loaded with gear and engine. The 30 footer has a single Detroit Diesel 6V92TI engine, configured by Johnson Towers rated at 375 horsepower (280 kW). The throttles are manually controlled, and the boat has a single screw and rudder.

The 30' SRB's were rated for a top speed of 31 knots (57 km/h) although most of the hulls fell prey to minor water intrusion into the FRP, which slowed most of the boats to around 28 knots (52 km/h) at max RPM. The 30 footer has a range of 130 nmi (240 km), and most standard operating procedures dictate that the boat not go more than 20 nautical miles (37 km) offshore without a waiver granted from higher level commands. The fuel capacity is 78 gallons at 100%, and the vessel is generally operated with a crew of two, a surfman and an engineer. The crew both stand on the coxswain flat, protected by the superstructure on the bow and stern. The boat's appearance has caused many to comment that it looks like a "Nike Tennis Shoe".

== Uses ==
The intent for the boat is that it be used for quick response. It is able to get on scene quickly, get into a surf zone and extract any persons in the water, or to stabilize a situation until the slower and larger motor lifeboat can get on scene. Since 1997 and the introduction of the faster 47' MLB and the phasing out of the 44' MLBs the need for a quick response vessel diminished making the 30 footers obsolete. The class of vessels underwent an overhaul in the early nineties to extend their life until the newer and faster 47' motor lifeboats came into service and in the late 1990s most of the 30 footers were de-commissioned. One still remains on active duty at Motor Lifeboat Station Depoe Bay in Depoe Bay, Oregon and is used almost daily. This station was host to the last 36' motor lifeboat in the late 1980s.

Even though the boats have many quirks, including "dynamic instability", where the boat becomes unstable at high speeds, many surfmen who became qualified on the boats have sworn by them. Sometimes referred to as a sports car compared to a tractor, referring to the larger MLBs, they are challenging to learn to operate but once mastered one of the most seaworthy boats the Coast Guard has used.

== See also ==
- CG 30615 Surf Rescue Boat in Morro Bay Maritime Museum
- Lifeboat (rescue)
- USCG
- 47' MLB
- USCG Utility Boat
