= Alma (tugboat) =

Tugboat built in 1927

Coordinates: 35.37049°N 120.85544°W

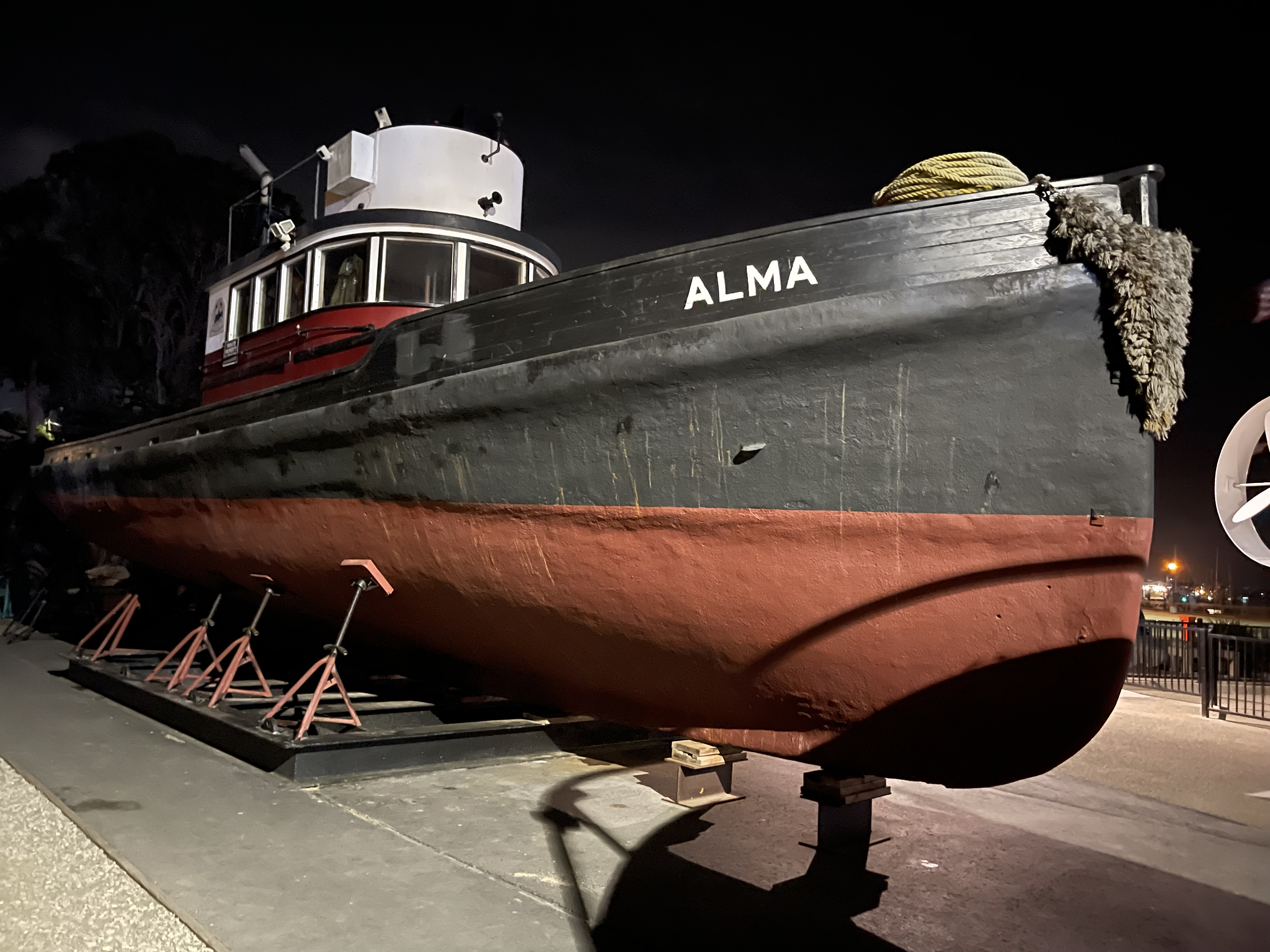
- Alma at Morro Bay Maritime Museum

History

United States
- Name: Alma
- Owner: 1927–1958: ?; 1958–1995: Sylvester’s Tug Service; 1995–present: Morro Bay Maritime Museum
- Builder: Beviacqua Brothers Genoa Boat Works, for San Francisco fisherman, Joseph Crivello
- Completed: 1927
- In service: 1927−1995
- Status: Museum ship at Morro Bay Maritime Museum in Morro Bay, California.

General characteristics
- Type: Tugboat/line boat/gas boat
- Length: 48 ft (15 m)
- Beam: 13 ft (4.0 m)
- Draft: 5.2 ft (1.6 m)
- Installed power: originally powered with an Atlas Imperial gasoline engine and finishing her career with a Detroit 6-71 diesel engine

Genoa Boat Works in San Francisco, California in 1927, where Alma was built

Alma is a tugboat preserved as a museum ship and static exhibit at the Morro Bay Maritime Museum in Morro Bay, California. ''Alma'' was launched in 1927 in San Francisco by the Beviacqua Brothers Genoa Boat Works near Fisherman’s Wharf. Alma is a small harbor tug/line boat, built out of wood, with sawn oak frames and carvel planked in port-orford Cedar. The former owners of Sylvester’s Tug Service, the Kelsey family, donated Alma in 1995 to the museum. No longer in the tugboat business, the Kelsey family now operates the Kelsey See Canyon Vineyards near Avila Beach. From 2008 until 2016 restoration and conservation work was performed primarily by Morro Bay Maritime Museum co-founder and current curator Lawrence Newland with some volunteer assistance. Work was also performed by local craftsmen Dana McClish and David Anderson via a grant from the Hind Family Foundation. In June 2015 most of the conservation work was completed and the boat was moved to its present location as an outdoor exhibit. This was prior to the museum building opening in 2017. ' Before her 1995 retirement, Alma operated out of Morro Bay.

== World War II ==
On the morning on December 23, 1941 the Japanese submarine I-21 torpedoed and sank the Union Oil tanker SS Montebello near the start of World War II. The Montebello had departed Port San Luis with crude oil bound for Vancouver, British Columbia, Canada. Alma with skipper Merle Molinari at the helm and deckhand Harold Turri departed her mooring at the Cayucos Pier to look for survivors of the sunken oil tanker. The 440ft long Montebello sank bow first in 880 feet of water, just north of Cambria, California. The Alma was able to pick up two of the tanker's four life boats delivering the crew to the Cayucos Pier. A second tug, the Ranier, towed the third lifeboat to shore. The fourth and last lifeboat which carried ship's captain, Olaf Eckstrom, was able to make it to a rocky shore near Cambria, California. There were no fatalities and all 33 crewmembers were saved. The tanker's wreck lies approximately four miles offshore in 880' of water, north of Cambria. The shipwreck was listed on the US National Register of Historic Places in 2016.

== See also ==
- List of museum ships in North America
- Angels Gate (tugboat)
- Spindrift (ship)
