= Derrick Boat No. 8 =

- U.S. National Register of Historic Places
- Location within New York Location within the United States
- Location: 1 W. 1st St., Oswego, New York
- Coordinates: 43°27′42″N 76°30′58″W
- Area: Less than 1 acre (0.40 ha)
- Built: 1927
- NRHP reference No.: 14001129
- Added to NRHP: January 7, 2015

Derrick Boat No. 8, also known as DB 8, is a historic floating derrick located at Oswego, Oswego County, New York. It was built in 1927, and it is one of the few surviving steam-powered floating derricks to have worked on the New York State Barge Canal. It has a 75 foot by 28 foot hull composed of both riveted and welded heavy steel plate. The site of the vessel's caretaker is the H. Lee White Marine Museum.

It was added to the National Register of Historic Places in 2015.
