= CCGS Bradbury =

1915 museum ship in Manitoba, Canada

Coordinates: 50.146377°N 96.865109°W

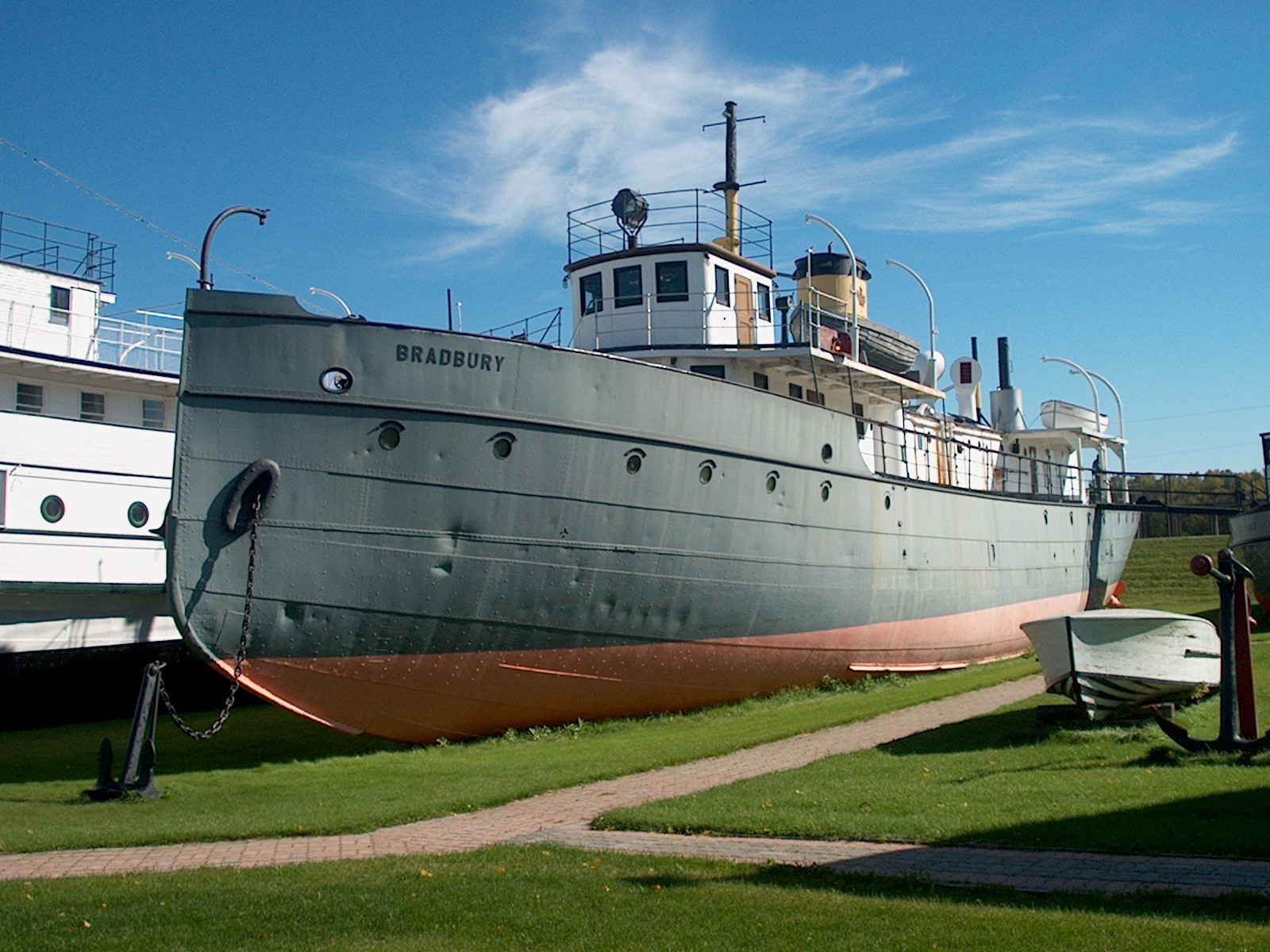
- CCGS Bradbury at Marine Museum of Manitoba

History

Canada
- Name: Bradbury
- Owner: Government of Canada
- Operator: Department of Marine; Department of Transport Marine Service; Canadian Coast Guard
- Builder: Government Shipyard, Sorel
- Laid down: 1915
- Commissioned: 1915
- Decommissioned: 1935
- In service: 1915
- Out of service: 1973
- Homeport: Selkirk, Manitoba
- Status: Museum ship since 1973

General characteristics
- Type: Fisheries patrol vessel/lighthouse tender/Icebreaker
- Length: 158 ft (48 m)
- Speed: 15 knots (28 km/h)

CGS Bradbury (later CCGS Bradbury) (Note: CCGS stands for Canadian Coast Guard Ship and CGS stands for Canadian Government Ship.) is a retired fisheries patrol vessel for the federal Department of Transport's Marine Services (as predecessor of today's Canadian Coast Guard), constructed in 1915. The vessel was sold to commercial interests in 1935. The ship was removed from service in 1973 and became a museum ship on static display at the Marine Museum of Manitoba.

== Description ==
Bradbury was of steel construction. 158 feet (48 m) long, the ship had a maximum speed of 15 knots (28 km/h). Initially powered by coal-burning steam engines, the ship was converted to diesel engines in 1935.

== Service history ==
Prefabricated in Sorel, Quebec, Bradbury was assembled on the bank of the Selkirk, Manitoba slough in 1915. Bradbury was operated as a federal fisheries patrol vessel on Lake Winnipeg until 1930, when the ship was transferred to the provincial Manitoba government. In 1917, Bradbury travelled through thick ice, taking doctors and medicine to a northern settlement struck by a flu epidemic.

Recommissioned in 1952 after having been idle since 1935, Bradbury remained in service until 1973. Bradbury is now on static display at the Marine Museum of Manitoba.

== Sources ==
- Piper, Liza (2009). The Industrial Transformation of Subarctic Canada. Vancouver: UBC Press. ISBN 978-0-7748-1532-1.
