= H. Lee White Marine Museum =

Coordinates: 43.463479°N 76.515607°W

H. Lee White Maritime Museum

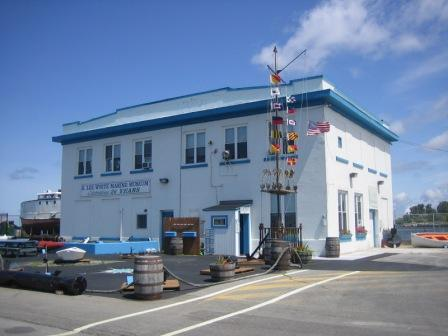
- Museum in 2009
- Established: 1982
- Location: West 1st Street Pier, Oswego, New York, United States
- Director: Mercedes Niess
- Website: www.hlwmm.org

The H. Lee White Maritime Museum is located in Oswego, New York. It was founded in 1982 by Rosemary Sinnett Nesbitt (1924–2009), a local professor and the City of Oswego Historian. Nesbitt retired from directorship of the museum in 2008 after completing 25 years of service.

It is the current home of the tugboat Nash, a National Historic Landmark, one of the few remaining US Army vessels from the Normandy Landings.

Located at the museum is the Derrick Boat No. 8, added to the National Register of Historic Places in 2015.

== See also ==
- List of maritime museums in the United States
- List of museum ships
