= Huntington (tugboat) =

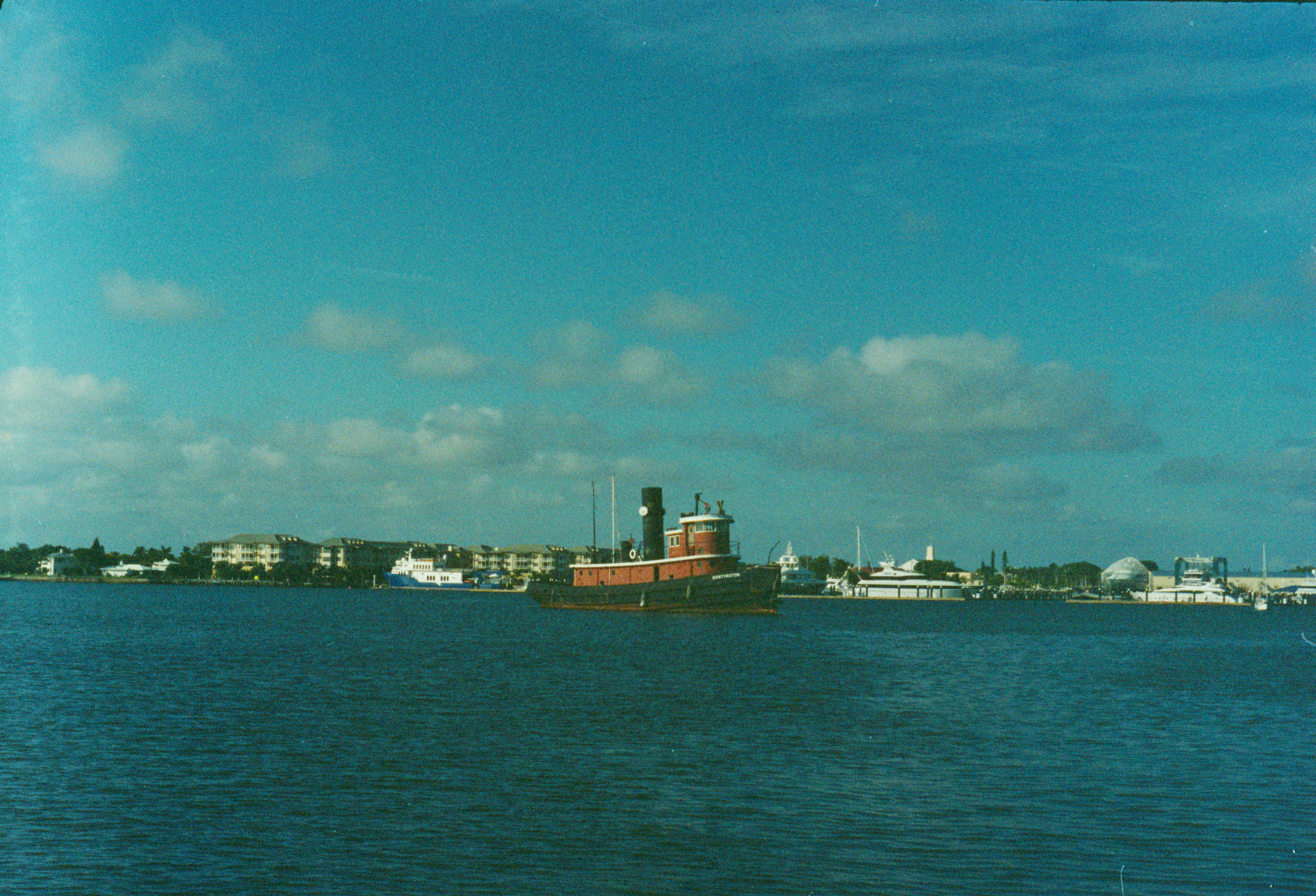
- Tugboat Huntington anchored near Jupiter Florida, 2009

History
- Builder: Newport News Shipbuilding and Dry Dock Company
- Launched: 1933
- Out of service: 1994
- Identification: IMO number: 5156907
- Fate: Scrapped in 2010

General characteristics
- Tonnage: 271.19 NRT
- Length: 109 ft 0 in (33.22 m)
- Beam: 29 ft 0 in (8.84 m)
- Draft: 12 ft 9 in (3.89 m)
- Huntington (Tugboat)
- Formerly listed on the U.S. National Register of Historic Places
- Virginia Landmarks Register
- Location within Virginia Location within the United States
- Location: 1 Waterside Dr.- Nauticus Pier, Norfolk, Virginia
- Built: 1933
- Architect: Newport News Shipbuilding Apprentice; School
- Architectural style: Steam Powered Tug
- NRHP reference No.: 99000958
- VLR No.: 122-5002

Significant dates
- Added to NRHP: August 5, 1999
- Designated VLR: June 16, 1999
- Removed from NRHP: February 7, 2017

Huntington was a historic tugboat, built in 1933 by the Newport News Shipbuilding and Dry Dock Company, Newport News, Virginia. She had a steel plate hull and a two-story superstructure that contained the main saloon, two cabins, heads and a galley on the lower level and wheelhouse and captains quarters on the upper level. The original coal-fired steam engine was replaced by a diesel engine in 1950. The ship is named for shipyard founder Collis Potter Huntington (1821–1900). Huntington was retired from service at Newport News Shipbuilding and Dry Dock Company in 1992, then retired finally in 1994. The ship later served as floating museum, before being scrapped in 2010.

She was listed on the National Register of Historic Places in 1999, and was removed from the National Register in 2017.
