= Warren Landing Upper Range Lights =

Warren Landing Upper Range Light
- Location: Warren Landing; Manitoba; Canada
- Coordinates: 53°41′40.1″N 97°52′13.9″W

Tower
- Constructed: 1908
- Construction: wooden tower
- Height: 6 metres (20 ft)
- Shape: square tower with lantern
- Markings: white tower, red trim, lantern and vertical band
- Operator: Canadian Coast Guard

Light
- Focal height: 9 metres (30 ft)
- Characteristic: F W

The Warren Landing Upper Range Lights are a pair of range lights in Warren Landing, Manitoba at the entrance to the Nelson River. Built in 1908, the lighthouses help to guide ship traffic from Lake Winnipeg into the river. They work in tandem with the Warren Landing Lower Range Lights.

Both lights of the range were originally square, pyramidal frame towers; at some point the rear tower was replaced by a skeletal tower, which still survives. The range is still active, and is one of the remotest light stations in Canada.

== See also ==
- List of lighthouses in Manitoba
- List of lighthouses in Canada
