= Morro Bay Maritime Museum =

Maritime museum in California

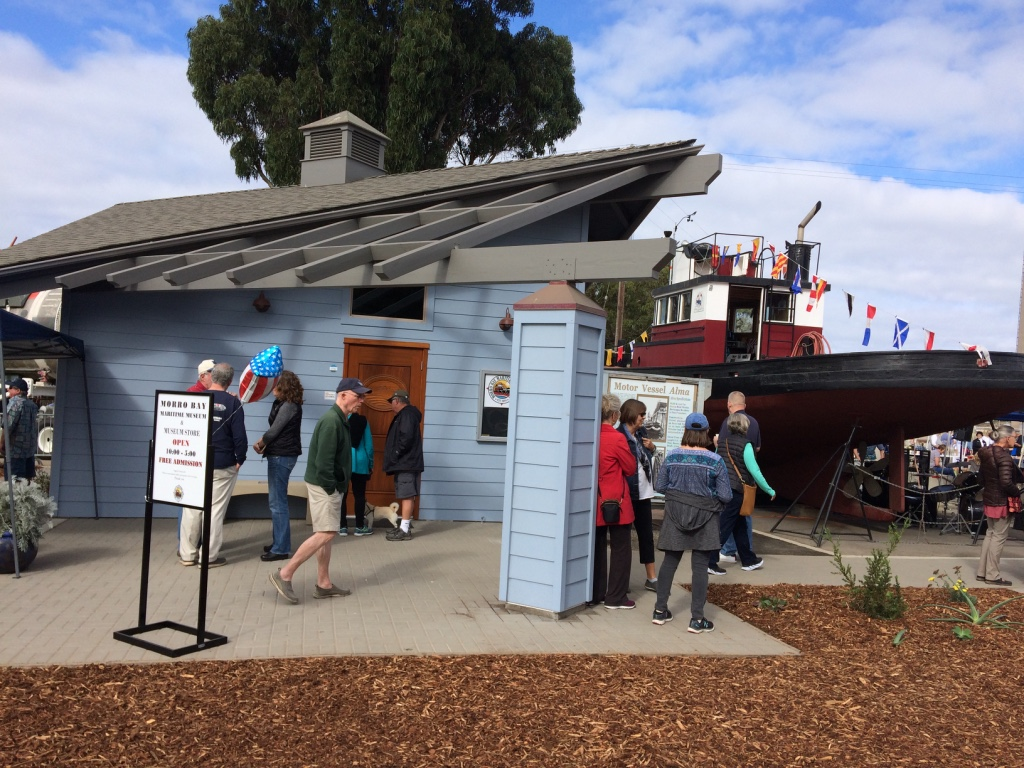
- The museum in September 2018

- Location within California Location within the United States
- Established: September 29, 2018
- Location: Morro Bay, California
- Coordinates: 35.37034°N 120.85547°W
- Type: Maritime museum
- Founders: Brent Roberts; Larry Newland; Jack Hunter
- President: Kendall Welch
- Curator: Lawrence Newland
- Owner: Morro Bay Maritime Museum Association
- Website: morrobaymaritime.org

The Morro Bay Maritime Museum is a maritime museum in Morro Bay, California. It contains a variety of historic boats and items, some recording the history of Morro Bay itself. It has free entry but mainly supports itself via donations and sales from its merchandise shop.

== History ==
The museum was founded by Brent Roberts, in the early 1990s, who gathered a group of maritime history enthusiasts, calling them the Central Coast Maritime Museum Association (CCMMA). The association was incorporated as a public-benefit and non-profit organization in 1995. The board of trustees worked with the city leaders to find feasible areas in Morro Bay for a museum. The association also sponsored visits of large ships to the Morro Bay harbor. These ships include Hawaiian Chieftain, Lady Washington, and replicas of Niña, HMS Endeavour, and San Salvador. The CCMMA also collaborated with NOAA and the Monterey Bay National Marine Sanctuary to initiate the first crewed dive on the SS Montebello. It now does business as the Morro Bay Maritime Museum.

The offices of the CCMMA were relocated to the museum in 2016 and the interior of the museum officially opened on September 29, 2018, with the exterior being already available to the public for some time earlier. During the opening ceremony, the site was blessed by members of the Salinan tribe. On October 6 of that same year, a weather balloon was launched by the Pacific Gas and Electric Company at the site, making it an official weather station.

The museum was affected by the COVID-19 pandemic, having to close its indoor exhibits. Despite this, it still was able to recuperate due to the presence of its outdoor ones.

== Activities ==
The museum's organization also hosts annual marine swap meets, in which members of the community can sell items such as kayaks and surfboards.

== Exhibits ==
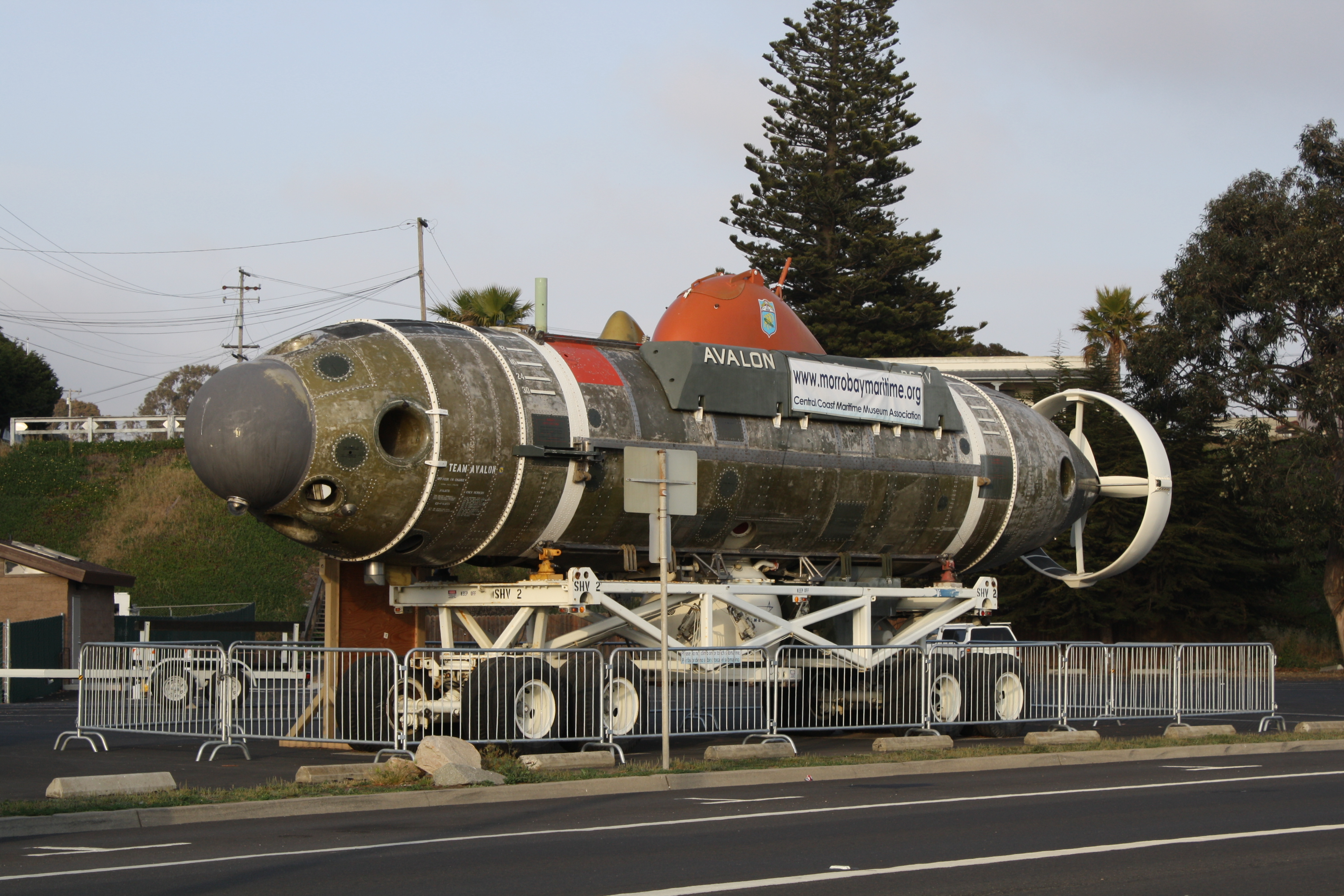
DSRV-2 Avalon at the museum, in an outdoor exhibit

Large boats are displayed outside and include the vessels: Alma, DSRV-2 Avalon, a 30' surf rescue boat, Spindrift, a Salinan tule boat, a replica two-person abalone submarine, and a bathysphere.

The museum also contains displays of Morro Bay's military history and status as the former "Abalone Capital of the World" and mooring buoys.
