= Warren Landing, Manitoba =

Warren Landing
- Location of Warren Landing in Manitoba
- Coordinates: 53°41′49″N 97°52′13″W
- Country: Canada
- Province: Manitoba
- Region: Northern
- Census Division: No. 22

Government
  - MP: Rebecca Chartrand
  - MLA: Tom Lindsey
- Time zone: UTC−6 (CST)
  - Summer (DST): UTC−5 (CDT)
- Area code: 204
- NTS Map: 063H12
- GNBC Code: GBDDK

Warren Landing is a small community in Manitoba, Canada. It is located at the northern end of Lake Winnipeg on Big Mossy Point, where the Nelson River originates.

The settlement is served by floatplane, since there is no airstrip. A winter road connects the settlement west to Grand Rapids, Manitoba. The nearest other community is Norway House, located approximately 30 kilometers north.

Warren Landing was named after Hudson's Bay Company gentleman John Warren, who was seriously wounded during the Red River Rebellion and died in the settlement. He was buried with military honors. A fish station, largest of the lake, was also located in Warren Landing. The settlement was also the northernmost dock for many Lake Winnipeg steamboats.

== See also ==
- Warren Landing Lower Range Lights
- Warren Landing Upper Range Lights
