= Angels Gate (tugboat) =

Tugboat built in 1944

Coordinates: 33.7387°N 118.2787°W

History

United States
- Name: 1944–1947: ST-695; 1947–1992: LAHD No.10/LAHD Angels Gate/Angels Gate; 1992–present: Angels Gate
- Owner: 1944–1947: United States Army; 1947–1992: City of Los Angeles Harbor Department; 1992–present: Los Angeles Maritime Museum
- Builder: Decatur Iron and Steel, Decatur, Alabama
- Completed: November 1944
- In service: 1944–1992
- Identification: Call Sign: WCX8709; USCG Doc. No.: 253997
- Status: Museum ship at Los Angeles Maritime Museum, San Pedro, Los Angeles, California

General characteristics
- Type: Tugboat
- Tonnage: 146 GRT
- Length: 81 ft (25 m)
- Beam: 23 ft (7.0 m)
- Depth: 10 ft (3.0 m)
- Installed power: 650 bhp (480 kW)
- Propulsion: Detroit Diesel, Fairbanks-Morse type diesel engine
- Speed: 9.5 knots (17.6 km/h; 10.9 mph)

Angels Gate is a tugboat preserved as a museum ship at the Los Angeles Maritime Museum in San Pedro, Los Angeles, California. Angels Gate was built in 1944 for the United States Army as tugboat ST-695, a 327-F design. The Army's small tugs, designated ST, ranged from about 55 to 92 ft (17 to 28 m) in length. The Angels Gate was built by the Decatur Iron and Steel in Decatur, Alabama. Angels Gate is small steel hull harbor tug. The United States Army used the ST-695 as an Army Port of Embarkation in Wilmington, California to move ships and maritime pilots. With World War II port duties completed, the Army declared ST-695 surplus in 1947. She was and acquired by the City of Los Angeles Harbor Department. She was renamed as the LAHD No. 10 and put in to Port of Los Angeles duties. The tug LAHD No 10 was renamed in 1956 to LAHD Angels Gate, this was later shortening just Angels Gate. Angels Gate was retired in 1992, and transferred as a fully functional museum ship to the Los Angeles Maritime Museum. She is powered by a single Detroit Diesel diesel engine with a single propeller. She as a length of 81 ft (25 m), a beam of 23 ft (7.0 m) and depth of 10 ft (3.0 m). She as two-stroke single acting six-cylinder Fairbanks-Morse type 37E1 diesel engine Los Angeles Maritime Museum used her for educational harbor tours and "classroom at sea" voyages for students at the Port of Los Angeles High School. Angels Gate is a Type V ship, as this is the United States Maritime Commission (MARCOM) designation for World War II tugboats. Type V tugs were used in World War II, Korean War, and the Vietnam War.

== See also ==
- List of museum ships in North America
- Alma (tugboat)

== Sources ==
- "V-type ships". shipbuildinghistory.com. 8 April 2010.
- "Yard Tugs (YT, YTB, YTM, YTL) Built or Acquired During WWII". shipbuildinghistory.com. 7 May 2011.
