= Snag (ecology) =

Dead tree

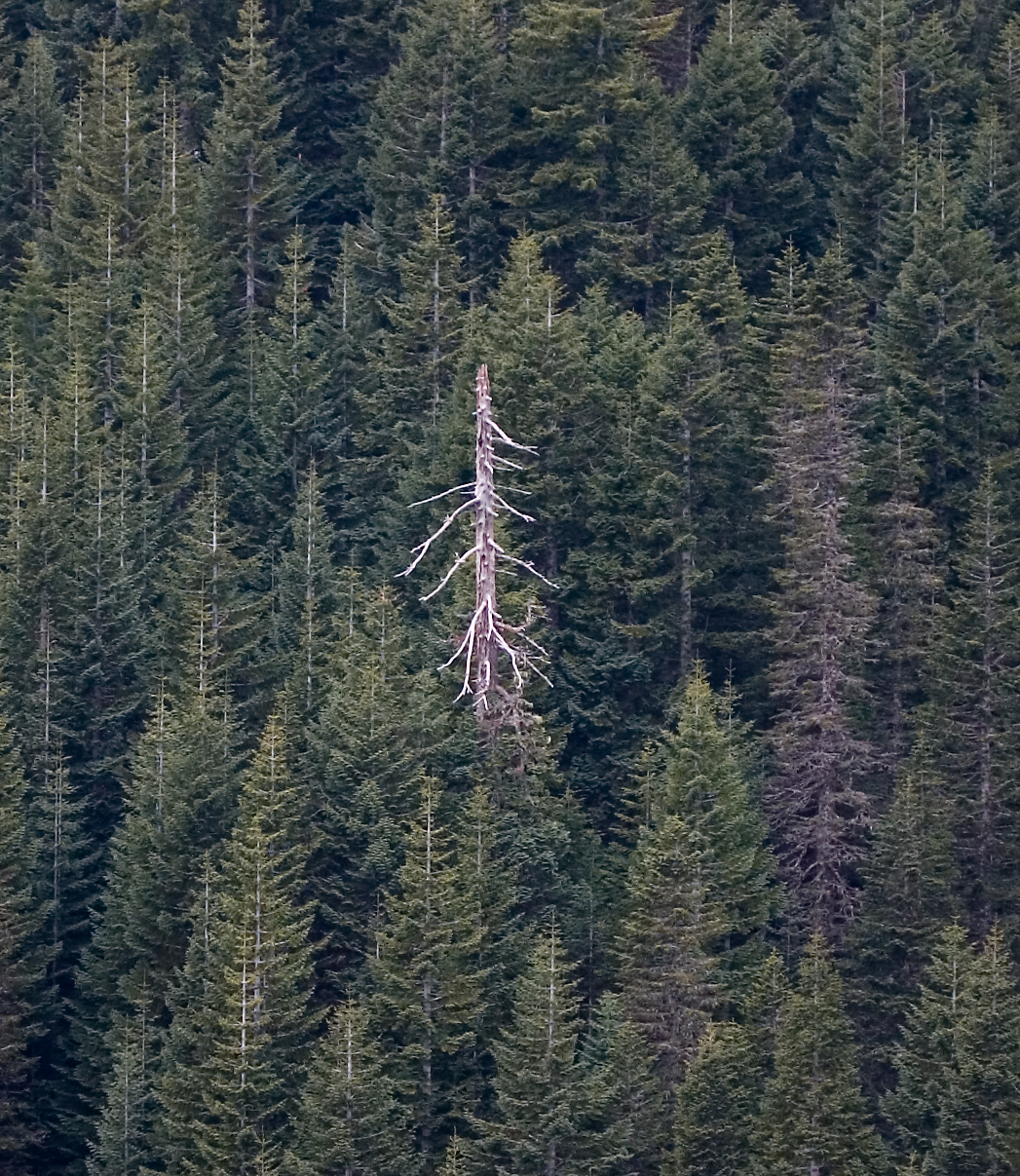
A fir tree snag among living fir trees

In forest ecology, a snag is a standing dead or dying tree, often missing a top or most of the smaller branches. In freshwater ecology the term snag refers to trees, branches, and other pieces of naturally occurring wood found sunken in rivers and streams; it is also known as coarse woody debris. Snags provide habitat for a wide variety of wildlife but pose hazards to river navigation. When used in manufacturing, especially in Scandinavia, they are often called dead wood and in Finland, kelo wood.

== Forest snags ==
Snags are an important structural component in forest communities, making up 10–20% of all trees present in old-growth tropical, temperate, and boreal forests. Snags and downed coarse woody debris represent a large portion of the woody biomass in a healthy forest.

In temperate forests, snags provide critical habitat for more than 100 species of bird and mammal, and snags are often called 'wildlife trees' by foresters. Dead, decaying wood supports a rich community of decomposers like bacteria and fungi, insects, and other invertebrates. These organisms and their consumers, along with the structural complexity of cavities, hollows, and broken tops make snags important habitat for birds, bats, and small mammals, which in turn feed larger mammalian predators.

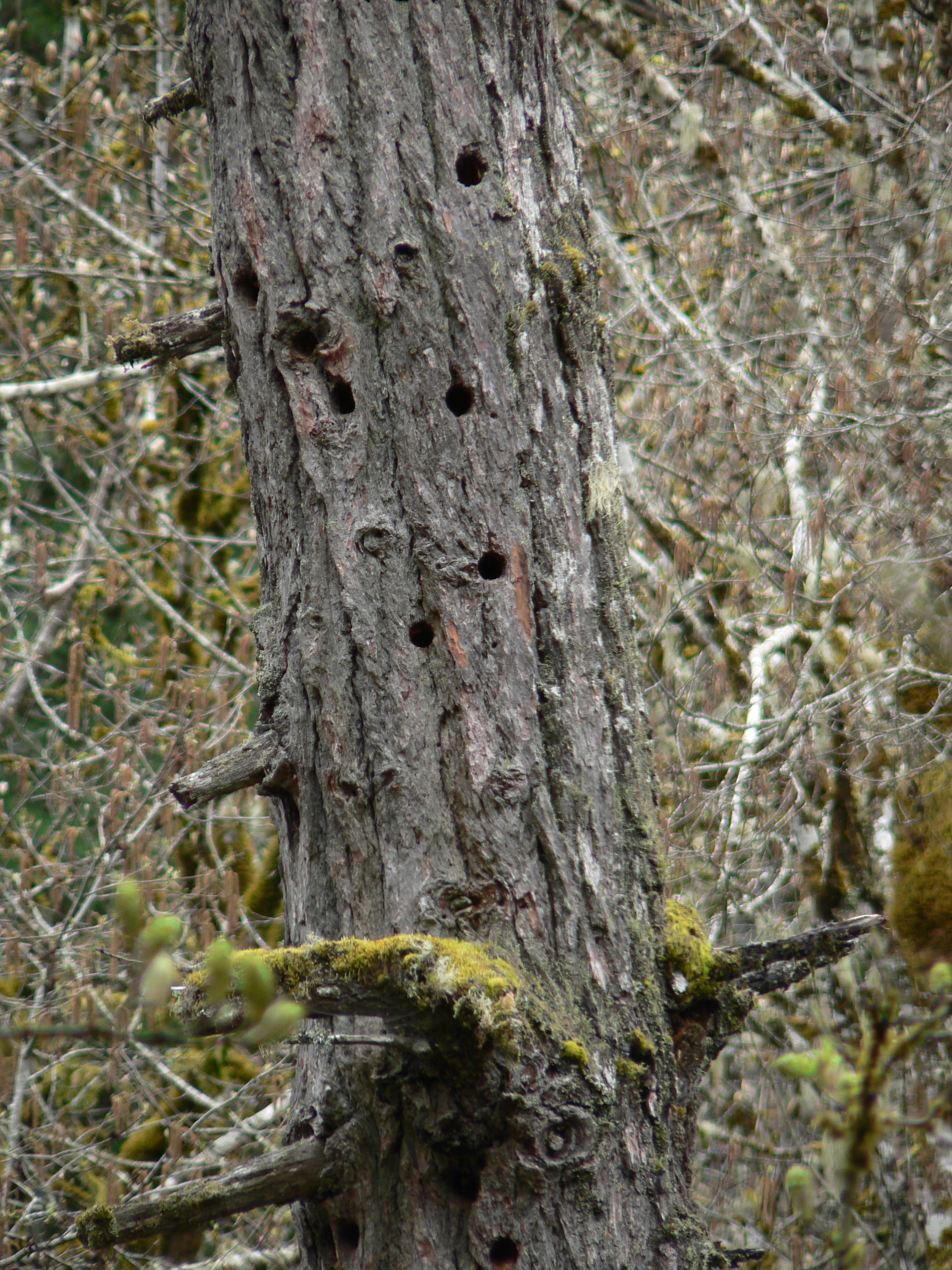
A coast Douglas-fir snag provides nest cavities for birds

Snags are optimal habitat for primary cavity nesters such as woodpeckers which create the majority of cavities used by secondary cavity users in forest ecosystems. Woodpeckers excavate cavities for more than 80 other species and the health of their populations relies on snags. Most snag-dependent birds and mammals are insectivorous and represent a major portion of the insectivorous forest fauna, and are important factors in controlling forest insect populations. There are many instances in which birds reduced outbreak populations of forest insects, such as woodpeckers affecting outbreaks of southern hardwood borers and Engelmann spruce beetles.

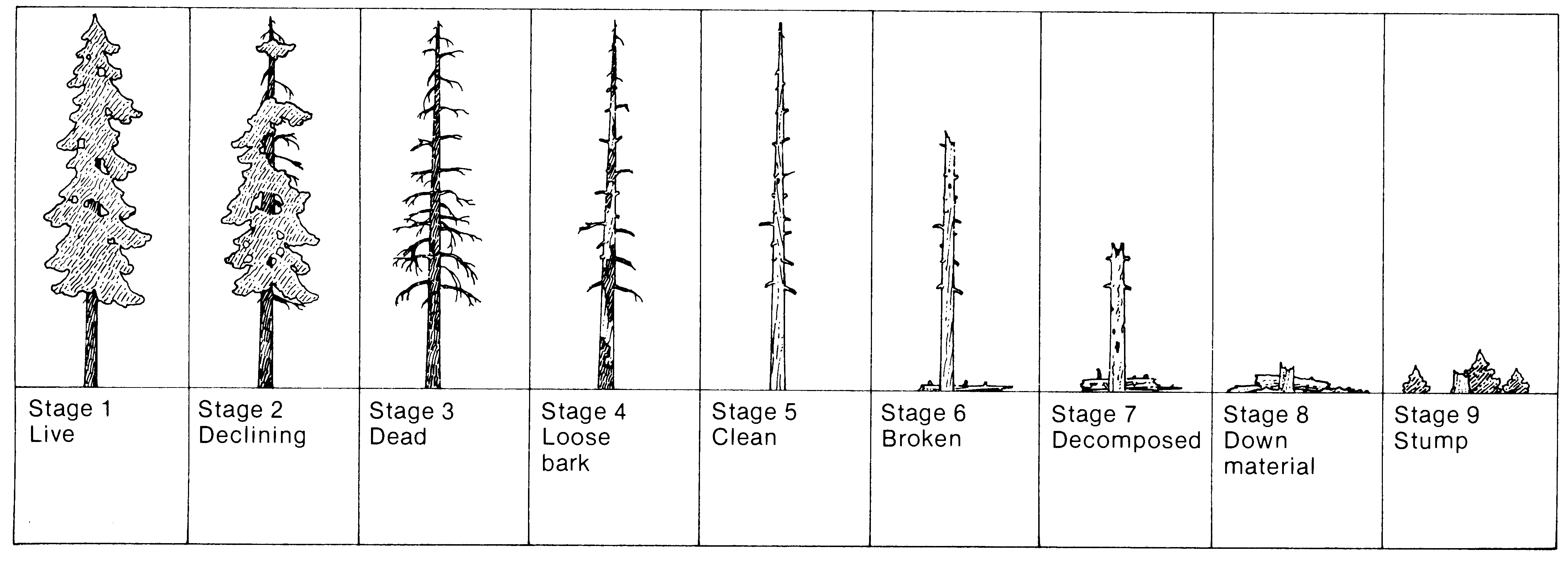
Successional stages of a snag from death of a tree to final decomposition.

Snag creation occurs naturally as trees die due to old age, disease, drought, or wildfire. A snag undergoes a series of changes from the time the tree dies until final collapse, and each stage in the decay process has particular value to certain wildlife species. Snag persistence depends on two factors, the size of the stem, and the durability of the wood of the species concerned. The snags of some large conifers, such as Giant Sequoia and Coast Redwood on the Pacific Coast of North America, and the Alerce of Patagonia, can remain intact for 100 years or more, becoming progressively shorter with age, while other snags with rapidly decaying wood, such as aspen and birch, break up and collapse in 2–10 years.

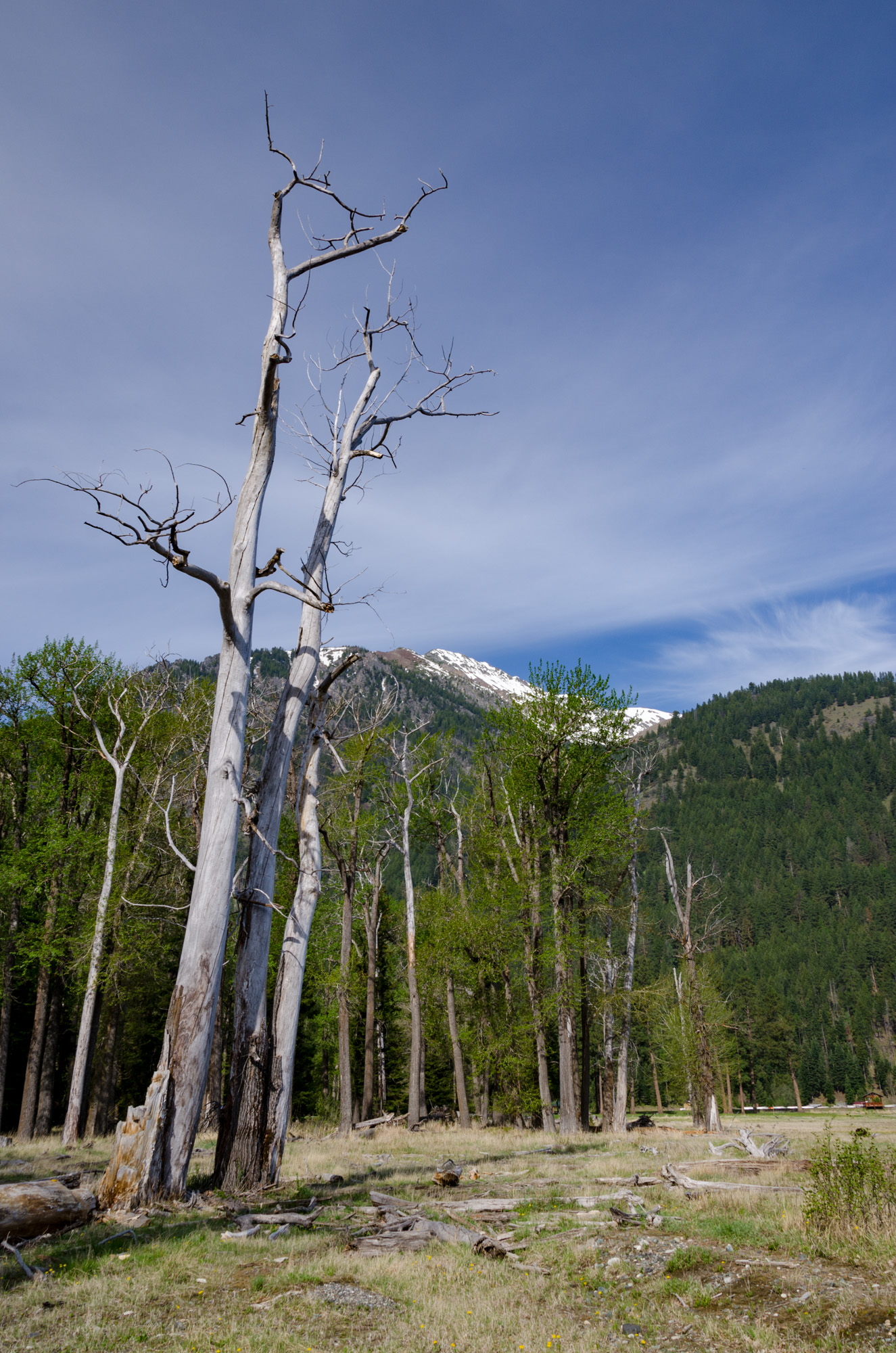
Stage 5 snags, Wallowa County, Oregon

Snag forests, or complex early seral forests, are ecosystems that occupy potentially forested sites after a stand-replacement disturbance and before re-establishment of a closed-forest canopy. They are generated by natural disturbances such as wildfire or insect outbreaks that reset ecological succession processes and follow a pathway that is influenced by biological legacies (e.g., large live trees and snags downed logs, seed banks, resprout tissue, fungi, and other live and dead biomass) that were not removed during the initial disturbance.

Water hunting birds like the osprey or kingfishers can be found near water, perched in a snag tree, or feeding upon their fish catch.

== Freshwater snags ==
In freshwater ecology in Australia and the United States, the term snag is used to refer to the trees, branches and other pieces of naturally occurring wood found in a sunken form in rivers and streams. Such snags have been identified as being critical for shelter and as spawning sites for fish, and are one of the few hard substrates available for biofilm growth supporting aquatic invertebrates in lowland rivers flowing through alluvial flood plains. Snags are important as sites for biofilm growth and for shelter and feeding of aquatic invertebrates in both lowland and upland rivers and streams.

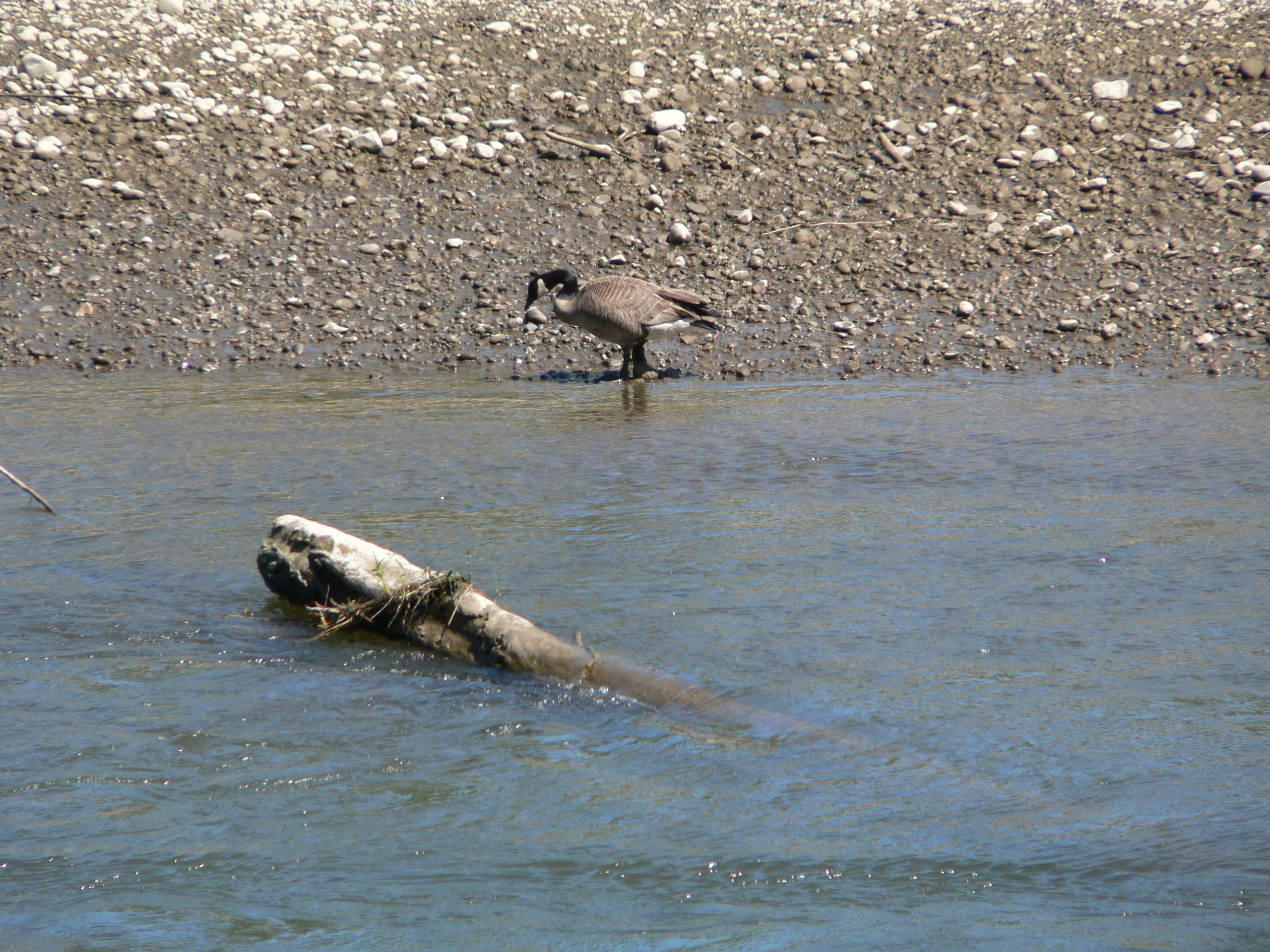
A Canada goose feeds near a snag in the Nisqually River

In Australia, the role of freshwater snags has been largely ignored until recently, and more than one million snags have been removed from the Murray-Darling basin. Large tracts of the lowland reaches of the Murray-Darling system are now devoid of the snags that native fish like Murray cod require for shelter and breeding. The damage such wholesale snag removal has caused is enormous but difficult to quantify, however some quantification attempts have been made. Most snags in these systems are river red gum snags. As the dense wood of river red gum is almost impervious to rot it is thought that some of the river red gum snags removed in past decades may have been several thousand years old.

== Maritime hazard ==
Also known as deadheads, partially submerged snags posed hazards to early riverboat navigation and commerce. If hit, snags punctured the wooden hulls used in the 19th century and early 20th century. Snags were, in fact, the most commonly encountered hazard, especially in the early years of steamboat travel. As described by a British traveller on the Mississippi in 1858, "We see plenty of snags, which are trees that have floated down; their roots in the water then catch fast in the mud; the stream breaks off the branches, and the sharp end of the tree sticks up, just at the right angles for catching any up-river boat, and often runs right through them, making a large leak, and sinking the unfortunate steamer."

In the United States, the U.S. Army Corps of Engineers operated "snagboats" such as the W. T. Preston in the Puget Sound of Washington State and the Montgomery in the rivers of Alabama to pull out and clear snags. Starting in 1824, there were successful efforts to remove snags from the Mississippi and its tributaries. By 1835, a lieutenant reported to the Chief of Engineers that steamboat travel had become much safer, but by the mid-1840s the appropriations for snag removal dried up and snags re-accumulated until after the Civil War.

== Dead wood products ==
In Scandinavia and Finland, snags, invariably pine trees, known in Finnish as kelo and in Swedish as torraka, are collected for the production of different objects, from furniture to entire log houses. Commercial enterprises market them abroad as "dead wood" or in Finland as "kelo wood". They have been especially prized for their silver-grey weathered surface in the manufacture of vernacular or national romantic products. The suppliers of "dead wood" emphasise its age: the wood has developed with dehydration in the dry coldness of the subarctic zones, the tree having stopped growing after some 300–400 years, and the tree has remained upright for another few hundred years. "Dead wood" logs are easier to transport and handle than normal logs due to their lightness.

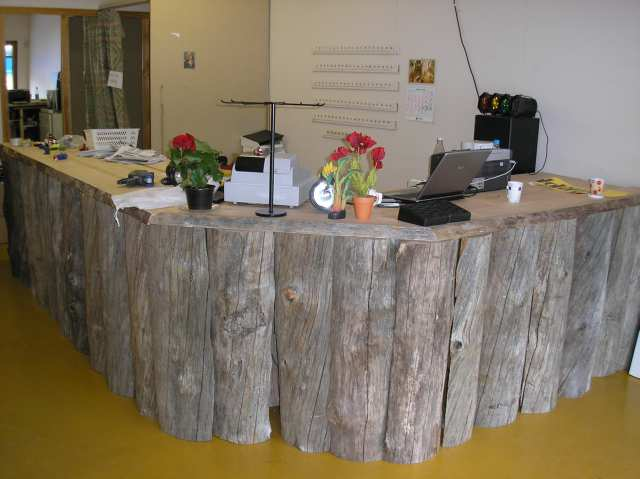
"Kelo wood" ("dead wood") used in Finland in the manufacture of rustic furniture products.

== See also ==
- Coarse woody debris
- Complex early seral forest
- Large woody debris
- Stream restoration
- Tree hollow
