= Secondary forest =

Forest or woodland area which has re-grown after a timber harvest

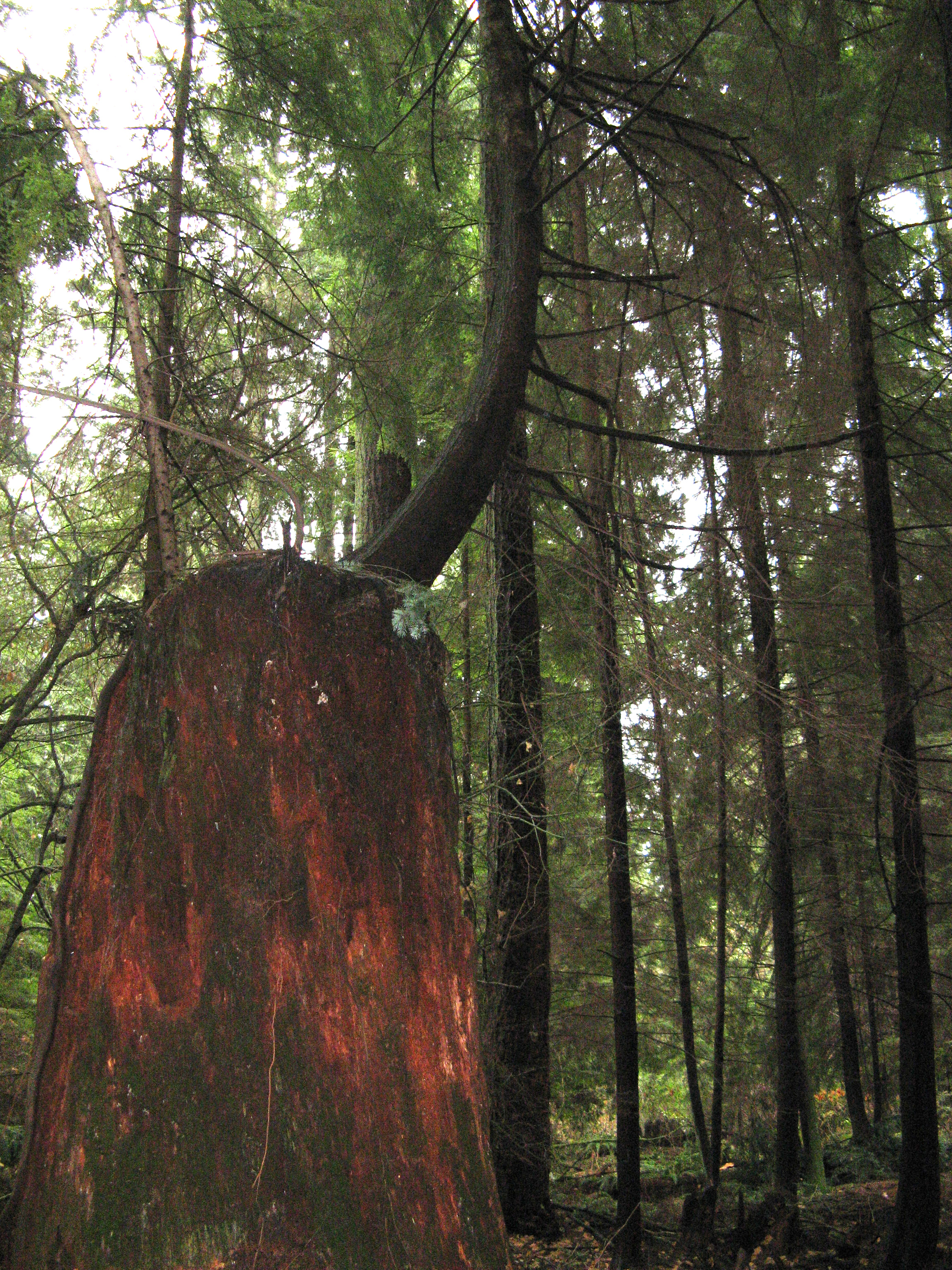
The forest in Stanley Park, Vancouver, British Columbia, Canada, is generally considered to have second and third growth characteristics. This photo shows regeneration, a tree growing out of the stump of another tree that was felled in 1962 by the remnants of Typhoon Freda.

A secondary forest (or second-growth forest) is a forest or woodland area which has regenerated through largely natural processes after human-caused disturbances, such as timber harvest or agriculture clearing, or equivalently disruptive natural phenomena. It is distinguished from an old-growth forest (primary or primeval forest), which has not recently undergone such disruption, and complex early seral forest, as well as third-growth forests that result from harvest in second growth forests. Secondary forest regrowing after timber harvest differs from forest regrowing after natural disturbances such as fire, insect infestation, or windthrow because the dead trees remain to provide nutrients, structure, and water retention after natural disturbances. Secondary forests are notably different from primary forests in their composition and biodiversity; however, they may still be helpful in providing habitat for native species, preserving watersheds, and restoring connectivity between ecosystems.

The legal definition of what constitutes a secondary forest vary between countries. Some legal systems allows certain degree of subjectivity in assigning a forest as secondary.

== Development ==
Secondary forestation is common in areas where forests have been degraded or destroyed by agriculture or timber harvesting; this includes abandoned pastures or fields that were once forests. Additionally, secondary forestation can be seen in regions where forests have been lost by the slash-and-burn method, a component of some shifting cultivation systems of agriculture. While many definitions of secondary forests limit the cause of degradation to human activities, other definitions include forests that experienced similar degradation under natural phenomena like fires or landslides.

Secondary forests re-establish by the process of succession. Openings created in the forest canopy allow sunlight to reach the forest floor. An area that has been cleared will first be colonized by pioneer species, followed by shrubs and bushes. Over time, trees that were characteristic of the original forest begin to dominate the forest again. It typically takes a secondary forest 40 to 100 years to begin to resemble the original old-growth forest; however, in some cases a secondary forest will not succeed, due to erosion or soil nutrient loss in certain tropical forests. Depending on the forest, the development of primary characteristics that mark a successful secondary forest may take anywhere from a century to several millennia. Hardwood forests of the eastern United States, for example, can develop primary characteristics in one or two generations of trees, or 150–500 years. Today, most of the forests of the United States – especially those in the eastern part of the country – as well as forests of Europe consist of secondary forest.

== Characteristics ==
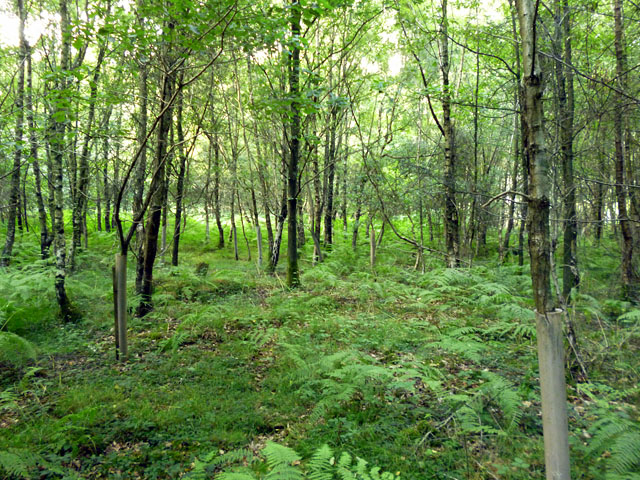
Oak plantings in a secondary woodland, Tilgate Forest. This mixed conifer and broadleaf woodland is located in West Sussex, United Kingdom.

Secondary forests tend to have trees closer spaced than primary forests and contain less undergrowth than primary forests. Usually, secondary forests have only one canopy layer, whereas primary forests have several. Species composition in the canopy of secondary forests is usually markedly different, as well.

Secondary forests can also be classified by the way in which the original forest was disturbed; examples of these proposed categories include post-extraction secondary forests, rehabilitated secondary forests, and post-abandonment secondary forests.

=== Biodiversity ===
When forests are harvested, they either regenerate naturally or artificially (by planting and seeding select tree species). The result is often a second growth forest which is less biodiverse than the old growth forest. Patterns of regeneration in secondary forests show that species richness can quickly recover to pre-disturbance levels via secondary succession; however, relative abundances and identities of species can take much longer to recover. Artificially restored forests, in particular, are highly unlikely to compare to their old-growth counterparts in species composition. Successful recovery of biodiversity is also dependent upon local conditions, such as soil fertility, water availability, forest size, existing vegetation and seed sources, edge effect stressors, toxicity (resulting from human operations like mining), and management strategies (in assisted restoration scenarios).

Low to moderate disturbances have been shown to be extremely beneficial to increase in biodiversity in secondary forests. These secondary disturbances can clear the canopies to encourage lower canopy growth as well as provide habitats for small organisms such as insects, bacteria and fungi which may feed on the decaying plant material. Additionally, forest restoration techniques such as agroforestry and intentionally planting/seeding native species can be combined with natural regeneration to restore biodiversity more effectively. This has also been shown to improve ecosystem service functionality, as well as rural independence and livelihoods. Some of these techniques are less successful at restoring original plant-soil interactions. In certain cases (as in Amazon tropical ecosystems), agroforestry practices have led to soil microbiomes that favor bacterial communities rather than the fungal communities seen in old-growth forests or naturally regenerated secondary forests.

=== Climate change mitigation ===
Deforestation is one of the main causes of anthropogenic carbon dioxide emissions, making it one of the largest contributors to climate change. Though preserving old-growth forests is most effective at maintaining biodiversity and ecosystem functionality, secondary forests may play a role in climate change mitigation. Despite the species loss that occurs with primary forest removal, secondary forests can still be beneficial to ecological and anthropogenic communities. They protect the watershed from further erosion and provide habitat; secondary forests may also buffer edge effects around mature forest fragments and increase connectivity between them. Secondary forests may also be a source of wood and other forest products for rural communities.

Though not as effective as primary forests, secondary forests store more soil carbon than other land-uses, such as tree plantations. Land-use conversions from secondary forests to rubber plantations in Asia are expected to rise by millions of hectares by 2050; as such, the carbon stored within the biomass and soil of secondary forests is anticipated to be released into the atmosphere. In other places, forest restoration – namely the development of secondary forests – has been a governmental priority in order to meet national and international targets on biodiversity and carbon emissions. Recommendations from the Intergovernmental Panel on Climate Change (IPCC), Convention on Biological Diversity, and REDD+ have led to efforts to reduce and combat deforestation in places like Panama and Indonesia. Natural and human-assisted growth of secondary forests can offset carbon emissions and help countries meet climate targets.

== Biomes ==
=== Rainforests ===
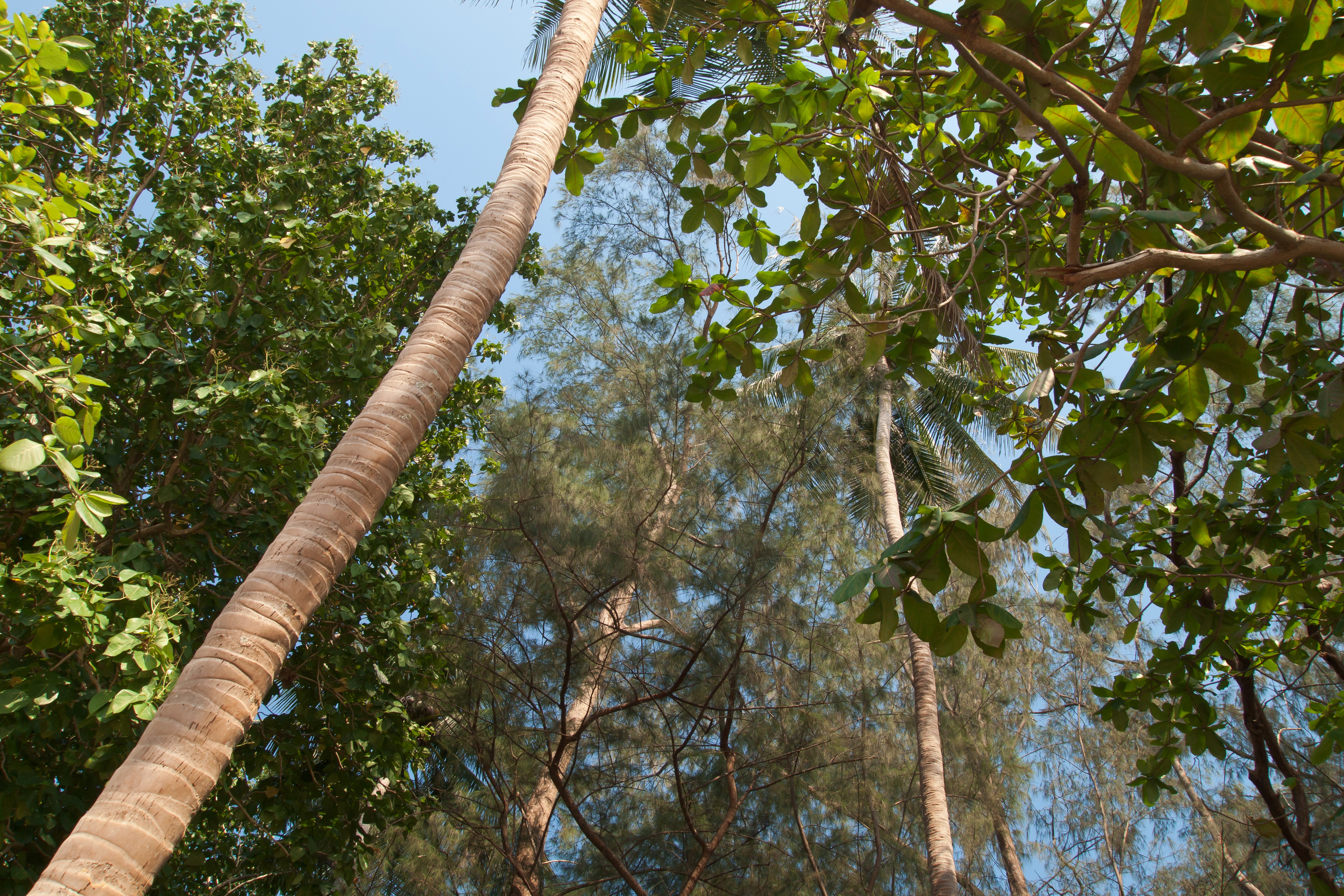
Secondary rainforest canopy on Ko Mak island in Thailand

In the case of semi-tropical rainforests, where soil nutrient levels are characteristically low, the soil quality may be significantly diminished following the removal of primary forest. In addition to soil nutrient levels, two areas of concern with tropical secondary forest restoration are plant biodiversity and carbon storage; it has been suggested that it takes longer for a tropical secondary forest to recover its biodiversity levels than its carbon pools. In Panama, growth of new forests from abandoned farmland exceeded loss of primary rainforest in 1990. However, due to the diminished quality of soil, among other factors, the presence of a significant majority of primary forest species fail to recover in these second-growth forests.

== See also ==
- Land use, land-use change and forestry
- Land use
- Overlogging
- Old-growth forest
- Ecological succession

== General references ==
- CIFOR Secondary Forest
- FAO Forestry
- World Resource Institute
