= Pickensville, Alabama =

- Town
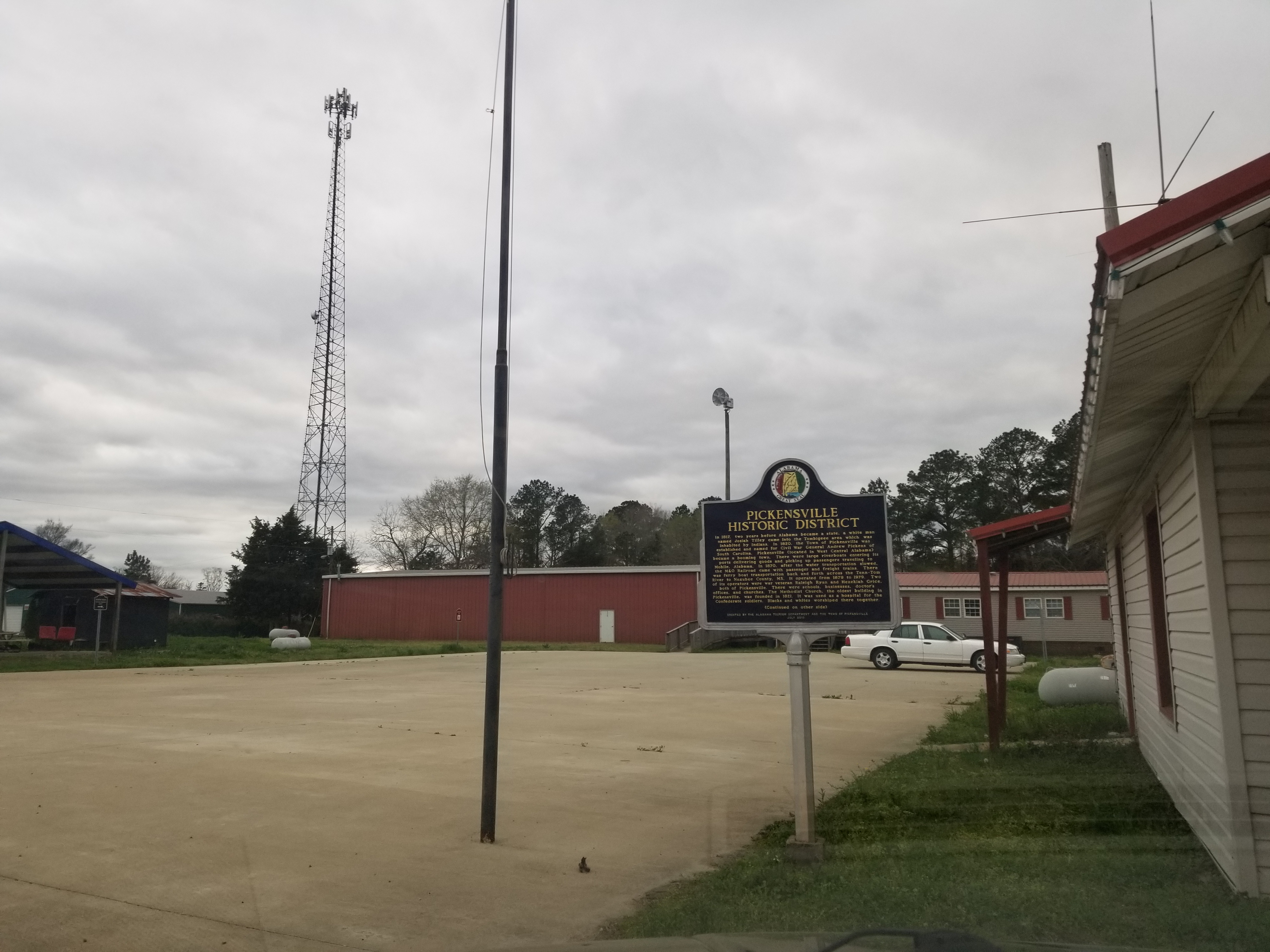
- Pickensville Historic District

- Location of Pickensville in Pickens County, Alabama.
- Coordinates: 33°14′45″N 88°16′30″W
- Country: United States
- State: Alabama
- County: Pickens
- Established: 1925

Government
  - Mayor: Don Sherrod

Area
  - Total: 10.06 sq mi (26.05 km^{2})
  - Land: 7.77 sq mi (20.13 km^{2})
  - Water: 2.29 sq mi (5.92 km^{2})
- Elevation: 135 ft (41 m)

Population (2020)
  - Total: 557
  - Density: 71.7/sq mi (27.67/km^{2})
- Time zone: UTC-6 (Central (CST))
  - Summer (DST): UTC-5 (CDT)
- ZIP code: 35447
- Area codes: 205 and 659
- FIPS code: 01-59592
- GNIS feature ID: 2407107

Pickensville is a rural town in Pickens County, Alabama, United States. As of the 2020 census, Pickensville had a population of 557. It was initially incorporated in 1839 (although two other sources claim 1825 and 1835) and briefly served before that as the first county seat of Pickens County. Carrollton was designated as the seat in the early 1830s.

According to the U.S. Census, the incorporation of Pickensville lapsed after 1920. It did not reappear again on the rolls of incorporated towns until 1970.

== Geography ==
According to the U.S. Census Bureau, the town has a total area of 10.0 square miles (26 km^{2}), of which 7.8 square miles (20 km^{2}) is land and 2.3 square miles (6.0 km^{2}) (22.73%) is water.

== Demographics ==
Historical population
Census	Pop.	Note	%±
1850	276		—
1880	264		—
1900	241		—
1910	214		−11.2%
1920	158		−26.2%
1970	132		—
1980	132		0.0%
1990	169		28.0%
2000	662		291.7%
2010	608		−8.2%
2020	557		−8.4%
U.S. Decennial Census; 2013 Estimate

=== Racial and ethnic composition ===
Pickensville town, Alabama – Racial and ethnic composition Note: the US Census treats Hispanic/Latino as an ethnic category. This table excludes Latinos from the racial categories and assigns them to a separate category. Hispanics/Latinos may be of any race.
Race / Ethnicity (NH = Non-Hispanic)	Pop 2000	Pop 2010	Pop 2020	% 2000	% 2010	% 2020
White alone (NH)	234	220	206	35.35%	36.18%	36.98%
Black or African American alone (NH)	417	386	342	62.99%	63.49%	61.40%
Native American or Alaska Native alone (NH)	1	2	2	0.15%	0.33%	0.36%
Asian alone (NH)	0	0	0	0.00%	0.00%	0.00%
Native Hawaiian or Pacific Islander alone (NH)	0	0	0	0.00%	0.00%	0.00%
Other race alone (NH)	2	0	0	0.30%	0.00%	0.00%
Mixed race or Multiracial (NH)	8	0	6	1.21%	0.00%	1.08%
Hispanic or Latino (any race)	0	0	1	0.00%	0.00%	0.18%
Total	662	608	557	100.00%	100.00%	100.00%

=== 2020 census ===
As of the 2020 United States census, there were 557 people, 309 households, and 198 families residing in the town.

=== 2010 census ===
As of the 2010 United States census, there were 608 people living in the town. 63.5% were African American, 36.2% White and 0.3% Native American.

=== 2000 census ===
As of the census of 2000, there were 662 people, 255 households, and 182 families living in the town. The population density was 85.4 inhabitants per square mile (33.0/km^{2}). There were 392 housing units at an average density of 50.6 per square mile (19.5/km^{2}). The racial makeup of the town was 35.35% White, 62.99% Black or African American, 0.15% Native American, 0.30% from other races, and 1.21% from two or more races.

There were 255 households, out of which 33.3% had children under the age of 18 living with them, 44.3% were married couples living together, 22.0% had a female householder with no husband present, and 28.6% were non-families. 24.3% of all households were made up of individuals, and 7.5% had someone living alone who was 65 years of age or older. The average household size was 2.60 and the average family size was 3.11.

In the town, the population was spread out, with 27.0% under the age of 18, 10.9% from 18 to 24, 25.5% from 25 to 44, 24.3% from 45 to 64, and 12.2% who were 65 years of age or older. The median age was 36 years. For every 100 females, there were 96.4 males. For every 100 females age 18 and over, there were 93.2 males.

The median income for a household in the town was $25,357, and the median income for a family was $28,036. Males had a median income of $25,625 versus $22,955 for females. The per capita income for the town was $15,575. About 29.2% of families and 34.4% of the population were below the poverty line, including 43.6% of those under age 18 and 53.2% of those age 65 or over.

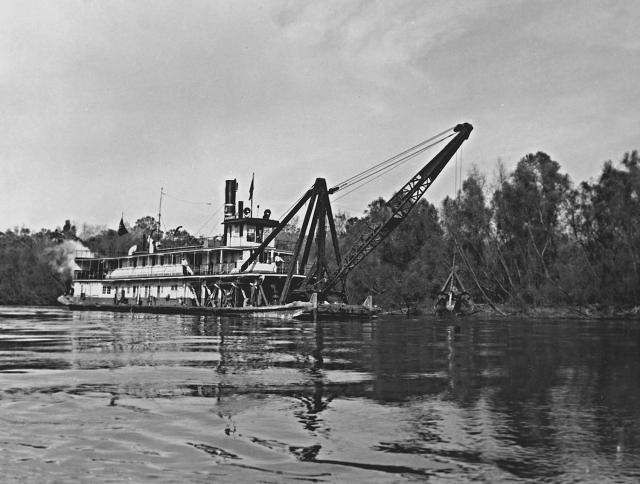
The snagboat Montgomery, now located at the Tom Bevill Museum in Pickensville

== Arts and culture ==
Pickensville is home to the Tom Bevill Visitors Center. The Tom Bevill Visitors Center and Museum is a replica of an antebellum plantation mansion built on the Tombigbee River. It houses exhibits on the Tennessee-Tombigbee Waterway and was named for Tom Bevill, a former U.S. Representative from Alabama who chaired the congressional committee that approved funding for the waterway project. The Montgomery, a 1925 restored snagboat, is located at the museum and operated as a museum ship.

== Education ==
Pickensville was formerly home to a now-defunct female seminary, the Pickensville Female Institute, incorporated in 1848.

== Notable people ==
- Lincoln Clark, member of the Alabama legislature; practiced law in Pickensville between 1931 and 1936
- Harvey Butler Fergusson, lawyer and politician
- Dwayne Ijames, defensive back
- William Belton Murrah, 19th-century Presbyterian minister
- Jacob H. Sharp, Confederate general in the Civil War; born in Pickensville in 1833

== Gallery ==
Below are photographs taken in Pickensville in April 1937 as part of the Historic American Buildings Survey (HABS) during the Great Depression:

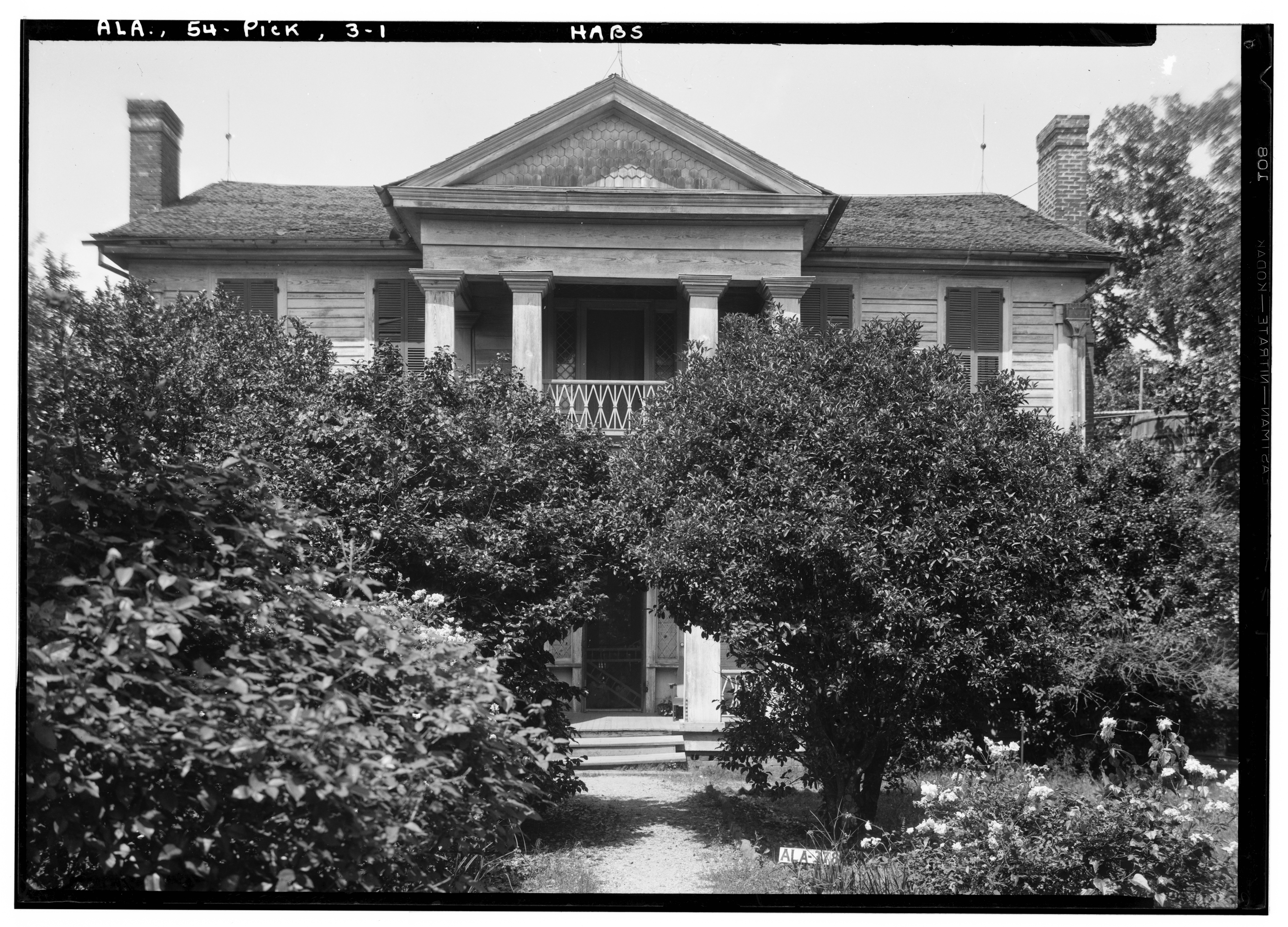
Doctor Wilkins House

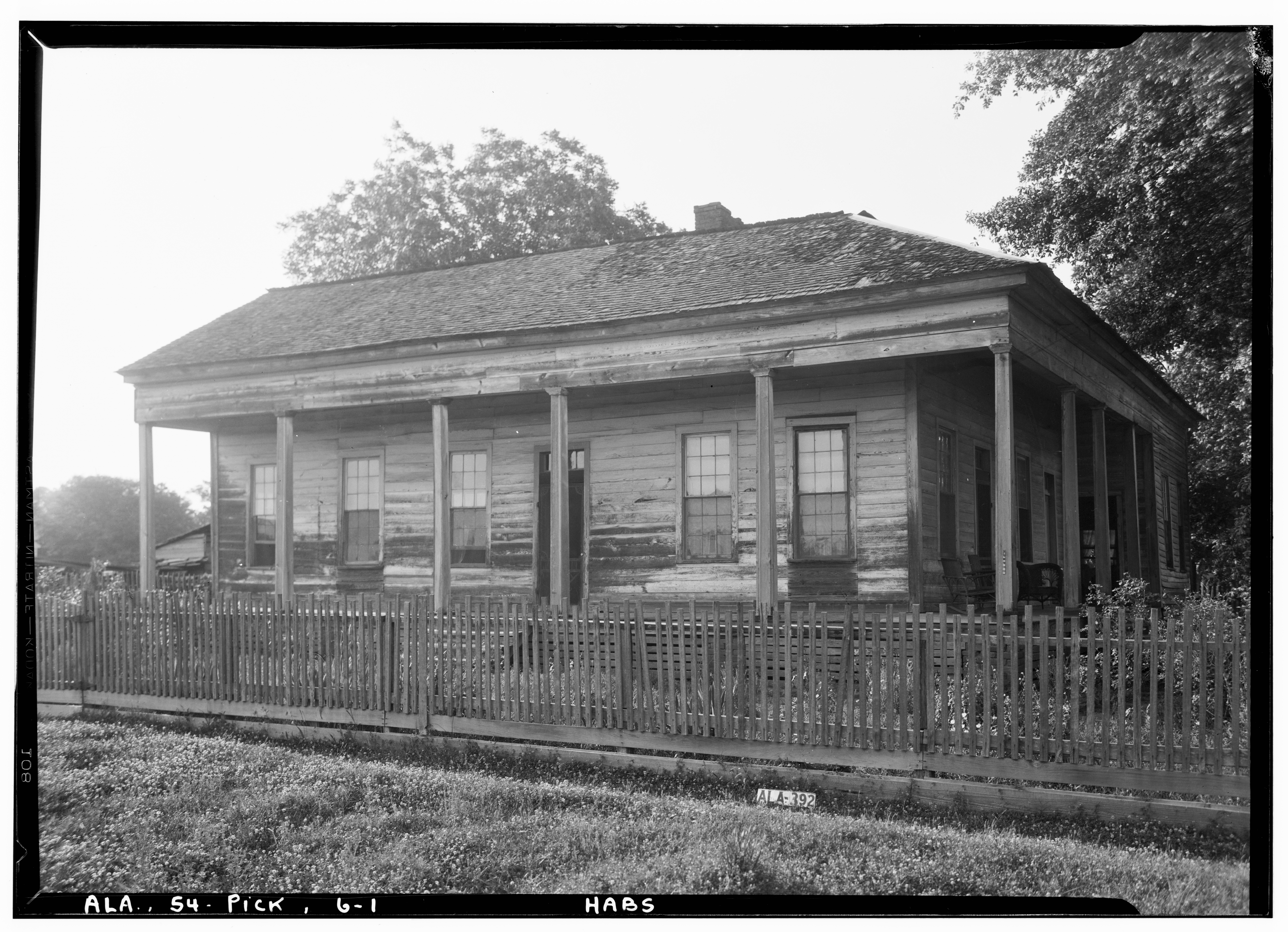
Henry Williams Saunders House

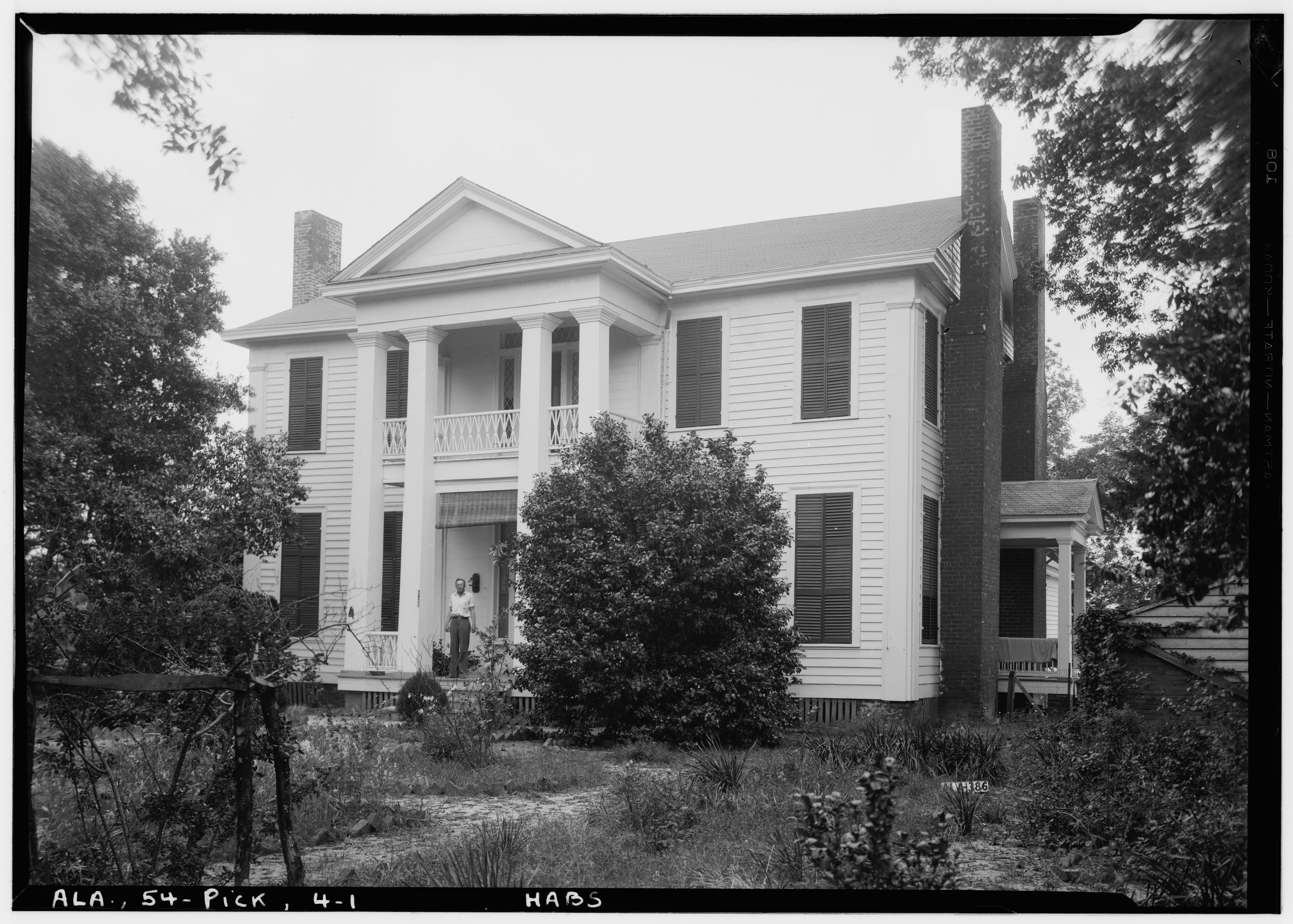
Ferguson-Long House

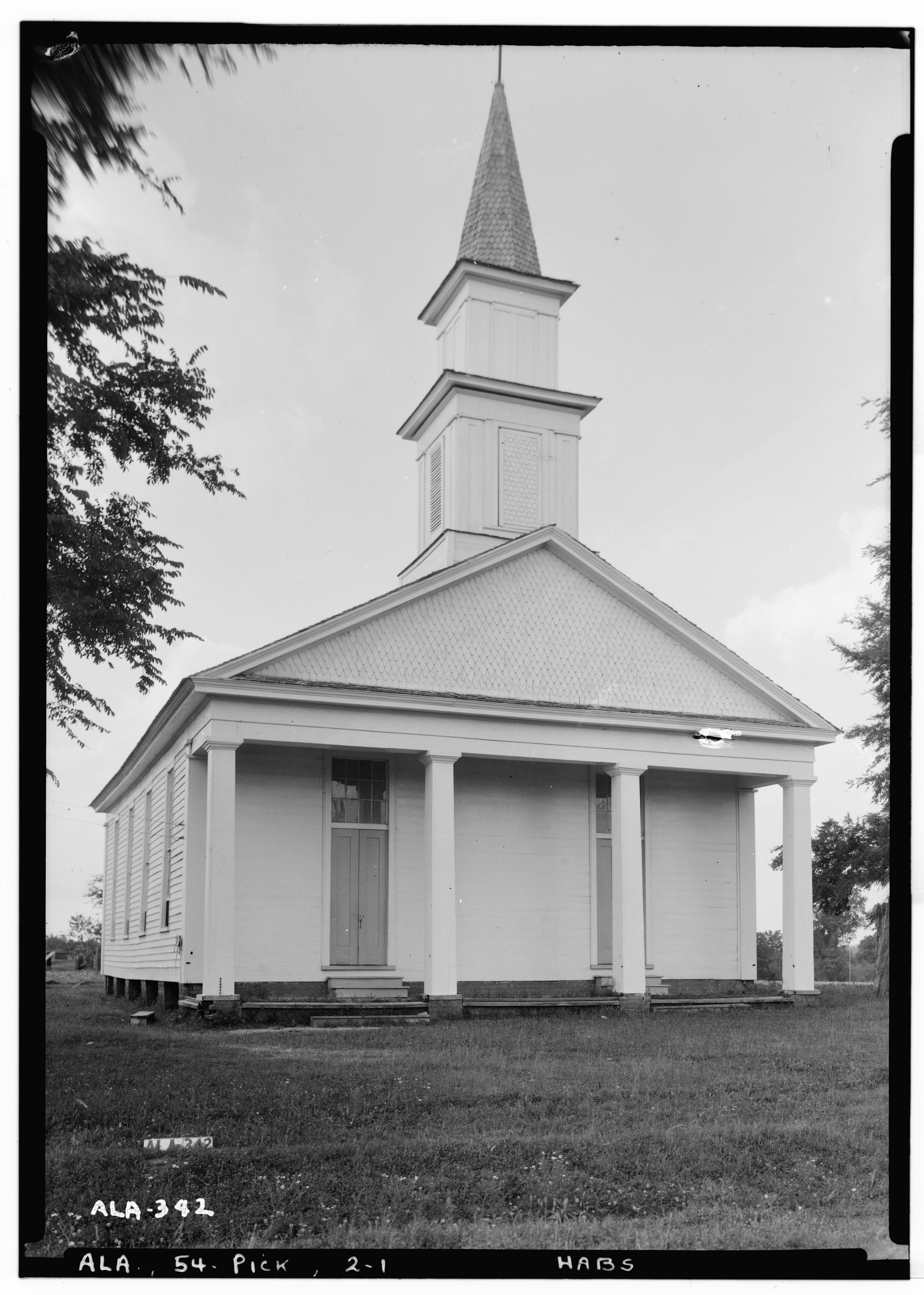
Baptist Church

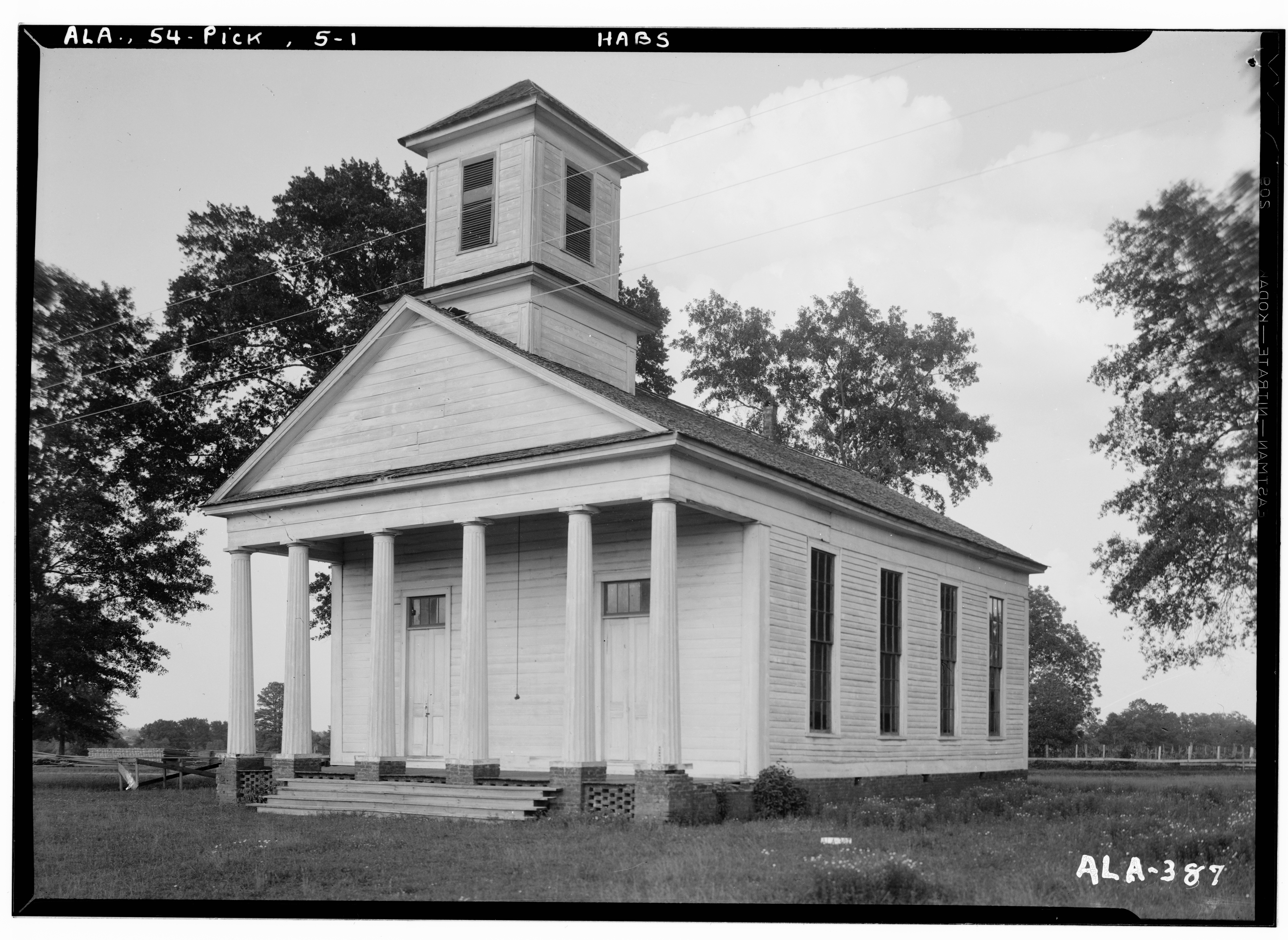
Pickensville Methodist Church
