= Yuba (snagboat) =

United States
- Name: Yuba
- Namesake: Yuba River
- Owner: U.S. Engineers Department of the Army
- Builder: A. W. de Young Boat & Shipbuilding Company, Alameda, California
- Laid down: 19 November 1924
- Launched: 27 February 1925
- Sponsored by: Catherine Woolsey Dorst
- Completed: March 1925
- Commissioned: April 1925
- Fate: unknown

General characteristics
- Type: snagboat
- Tonnage: 410 GRT
- Length: 166 ft (51 m) o/a
- Beam: 37 ft 8 in (11.48 m)
- Draught: 5 ft 6 in (1.68 m)
- Installed power: 200 IHP
- Propulsion: steam, oil-fueled
- Complement: 30 (26 enlisted and 4 officers)

Yuba was a wooden-hulled, stern-wheel steamship that served as a snagboat for the United States Army Corps of Engineers.

== History ==
Yuba was a stern-wheeled, shallow draft steamship ordered by the United States Army Corps of Engineers) to serve as a snagboat on the Sacramento River. Her namesake was the Yuba River, a tributary of the Feather River which was the principal tributary of the Sacramento River. The first snagboat on the Sacramento River, Seizer (240 GRT, 1881), had retired in 1921 and its replacement, Bear (242 GT, 1921), was in need of support. Yuba was laid down on 19 November 1924 at the Alameda, California shipyard of A. W. de Young Boat & Shipbuilding Company who won the contract with a bid price of $78,346. The ship was designed by Captain Thomas B. Foster. The engine from the retired snagboat Seizer was utilized. She was launched on 27 February 1925, completed in March 1925, and commissioned in April 1925. She carried a complement of 4 officers and 26 enlisted men. She worked primarily on the San Joaquin River, the Mokelumne River, and the Sacramento River. Her ultimate fate is unknown.
