= W. T. Preston =

American steamship

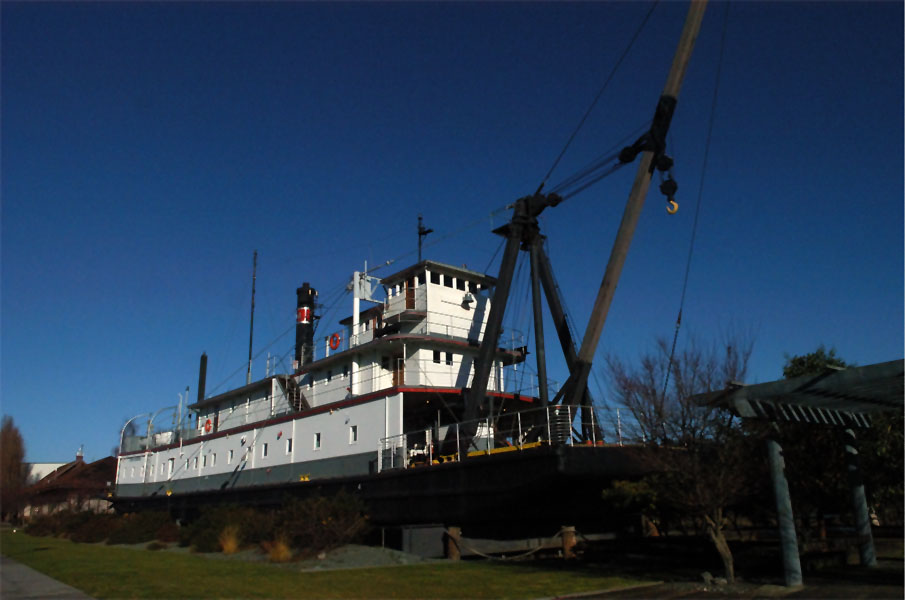
- W. T. Preston in her dry berth in Anacortes, Washington

History

United States
- Name: W. T. Preston
- Owner: United States Army Corps of Engineers
- Operator: United States Army Corps of Engineers
- Port of registry: Seattle, Washington, United States
- Ordered: 1927 (est)
- Builder: Lake Union Dry Dock Company
- Laid down: 1928 (est)
- Launched: 1929
- Christened: 1931 (est)
- Completed: 1930 (est)
- Acquired: 1932 (est)
- In service: 1932 (est)
- Out of service: 1981
- Refit: 1939 (re-hulled)
- Status: Museum ship

General characteristics
- Class & type: Snagboat
- Tonnage: 490 Gross Tons
- Length: 163 ft 6 in (49.83 m)
- Beam: 34 ft 8.5 in (10.579 m)
- Height: 42 ft (13 m)
- Draft: 3 ft 8 in (1.12 m)
- Decks: 3
- Installed power: 180 psi (1,200 kPa) Firetube boiler; 2 × 150 hp (110 kW) reciprocating steam engines
- Propulsion: Sternwheel
- Speed: 9 knots (17 km/h; 10 mph) (cruise) 12 knots (22 km/h; 14 mph) (max)
- Capacity: derrick: 70 tons
- Crew: 14
- W. T. Preston (snagboat)
- U.S. National Register of Historic Places
- U.S. National Historic Landmark
- Seattle Landmark
- Location within Washington (state) Location within the United States
- Location: Anacortes waterfront, R Avenue, at foot of 7th Street, Anacortes, Washington
- Coordinates: 48°30′58″N 122°36′33″W
- Built: 1929 (re-hulled in 1939)
- Architect: Lake Union Drydock Co.
- Architectural style: Welded Barge Hull, Wooden Super Structure, Sternwheeler
- NRHP reference No.: 72001270

Significant dates
- Added to NRHP: 16 March 1972
- Designated NHL: 5 May 1989
- Designated SEATL: March 14, 1977

W. T. Preston is a specialized sternwheeler that operated as a snagboat, removing log jams and natural debris that prevented river navigation on several Puget Sound-area rivers. She is now the centerpiece of the Maritime Heritage Center in Anacortes, Washington. She was designated a National Historic Landmark in 1989. Built in 1939, she is one of two surviving snagboats built and operated by the United States Army Corps of Engineers, and the only one on the American west coast.

== History ==
W. T. Preston operated from Olympia to Blaine, including the Skagit, Stillaguamish, and Snohomish rivers. Dead trees that reached Puget Sound often became half-submerged deadheads that could pierce the hulls of wooden vessels. The federal government began building snagboats to remove obstructions and facilitate river based commerce. W. T. Preston was named in honor of the only civilian engineer to work for the Army Corps of Engineers at the time of her construction in 1929. W. T. Preston used the main single expansion reciprocating steam engines, as well as many pumps and other hardware from her 1914 predecessor Swinomish. The Swinomish was built to replace the earlier Skagit, the first snagboat to work the rivers of the Puget Sound.

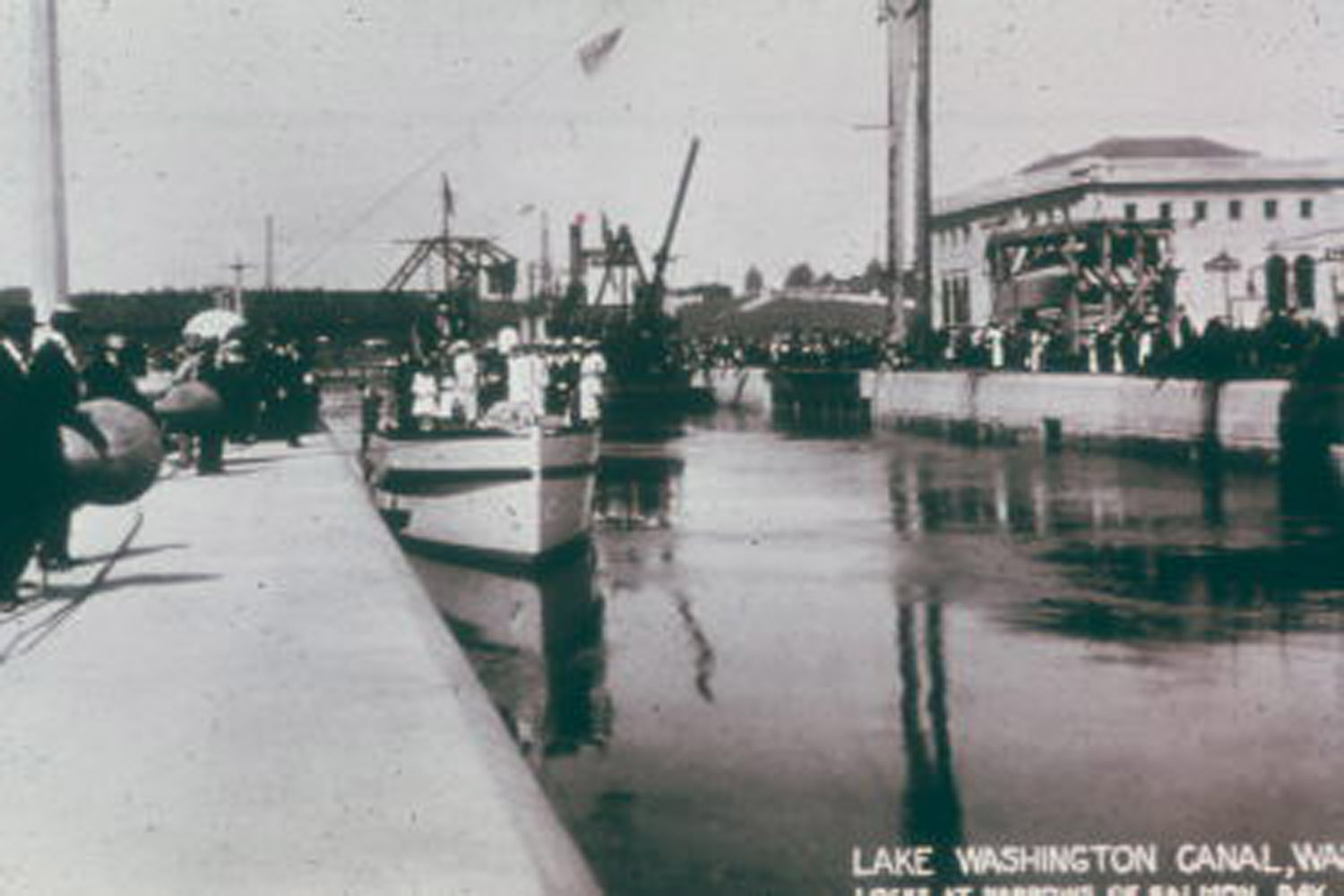
Dedication of the Hiram M. Chittenden Locks on 4 July 1917, showing the Swinomish in the background, from which the W.T. Preston was built.

In many respects the W. T. Preston is similar to the Samson V, a former Canadian Department of Public Works snagboat now preserved as a museum in New Westminster, British Columbia. Sternwheeler machinery was simple and rugged and often outlasted the shallow-draughted hulls of the vessels. When the Samson V was built in 1937 it incorporated engines and a paddlewheel shaft from the Samson II of 1905, A-frame crane components from the Samson III of 1914 and the steam-winch from the Samson IV of 1924. Like the W. T. Preston, the Samson V maintained waterways for navigation and when retired in 1980, she was the last steam-powered paddlewheeler running in Canada.

The original W. T. Preston was a 163-foot, wooden-hulled vessel which pulled snags, performed light dredging, and otherwise worked the waters of Puget Sound until 1939; when, the Army Corps of Engineers built a new superstructure atop a welded steel hull and transferred the stern wheel, main engines, smokestack, foredeck equipment, and other items onto the second WT Preston. The mission of W. T. Preston changed throughout the years. As rivers were used less and less for transportation of goods, W. T. Preston began to dredge, fight fires, and perform other general work. Throughout her commission, she even retrieved a sunken military bomber, and several automobiles.

The Army Corps of Engineers operated W. T. Preston out of the Hiram M. Chittenden Locks, in Seattle, Washington. This boat served the Puget Sound for more than forty years before the Army Corps retired her in 1981. Her replacement, Puget, still operates today out of W. T. Preston's previous dock at the Hiram M. Chittenden Locks.

== Maritime Heritage Center ==
W. T. Preston is now permanently dry berthed on the waterfront near Cap Sante, in Anacortes, Washington. The vessel is a National Historic Landmark and remains officially a designated city historic landmark in Seattle (her former location). The ship now operates as a history museum, and is owned and operated by the City of Anacortes' City Museum. In 2005, the Snagboat Heritage Center was built just north of W. T. Preston. This interpretive center houses artifacts, models, maps and other historical text and information about the snagboats that maintained the area's navigable waterways.

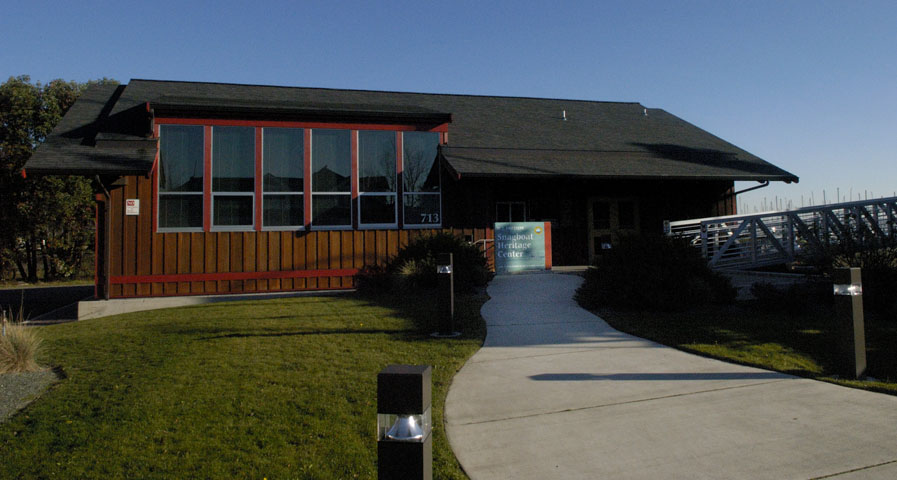
The Snagboat Heritage Center

== See also ==
- Montgomery Snagboat
- Historic preservation
