= Seizer (snagboat) =

United States
- Name: Seizer
- Owner: U.S. Army Corps of Engineers
- Launched: 1881, Stockton, California
- Completed: 1881
- Reclassified: Barracks ship, 1921
- Fate: unknown

General characteristics
- Type: snagboat
- Tonnage: 240 GRT
- Length: 157 ft 7 in (48.03 m) o/a
- Beam: 35 ft 0 in (10.67 m)
- Draught: 4 ft 8 in (1.42 m)
- Propulsion: steam
- Speed: 6-7 knots

Seizer was a wooden-hulled, stern-wheel steamship that served as the first snagboat for the United States Army Corps of Engineers on the Sacramento River.

== History ==
Seizer was a stern-wheeled, shallow draft steamship ordered by the United States Army Corps of Engineers) to serve as the first snagboat on the Sacramento, the Mokelumne, and the San Joaquin Rivers. She was built in Stockton, California in 1881 and outfitted with a wood-fueled steam boiler which enabled her to cruise at a speed of 6-7 knots. The ship was painted white with a red line and a mahogany smoke stake. She was captained by Captain "Rush" Fisher of Missouri and carried a crew of 33 men. The crew included divers from Hawaii who were able swimmers and capable of entering the muddy waters to attach chains to sunken trees. In 1895, she overhauled and fitted to burn coal. By 1919, she was using oil as a fuel. In 1908 she was joined by a snag scow, Tackle (30 GRT, 64 x 28 x 3.5), which was designed to operate in much shallower waters. She retired in 1921 after the completion of her replacement, Bear (242 GRT), and was converted into a quarter boat. Her steam engine was utilized in the snagboat Yuba (410 GRT) built in 1925.
