= Bear (snagboat) =

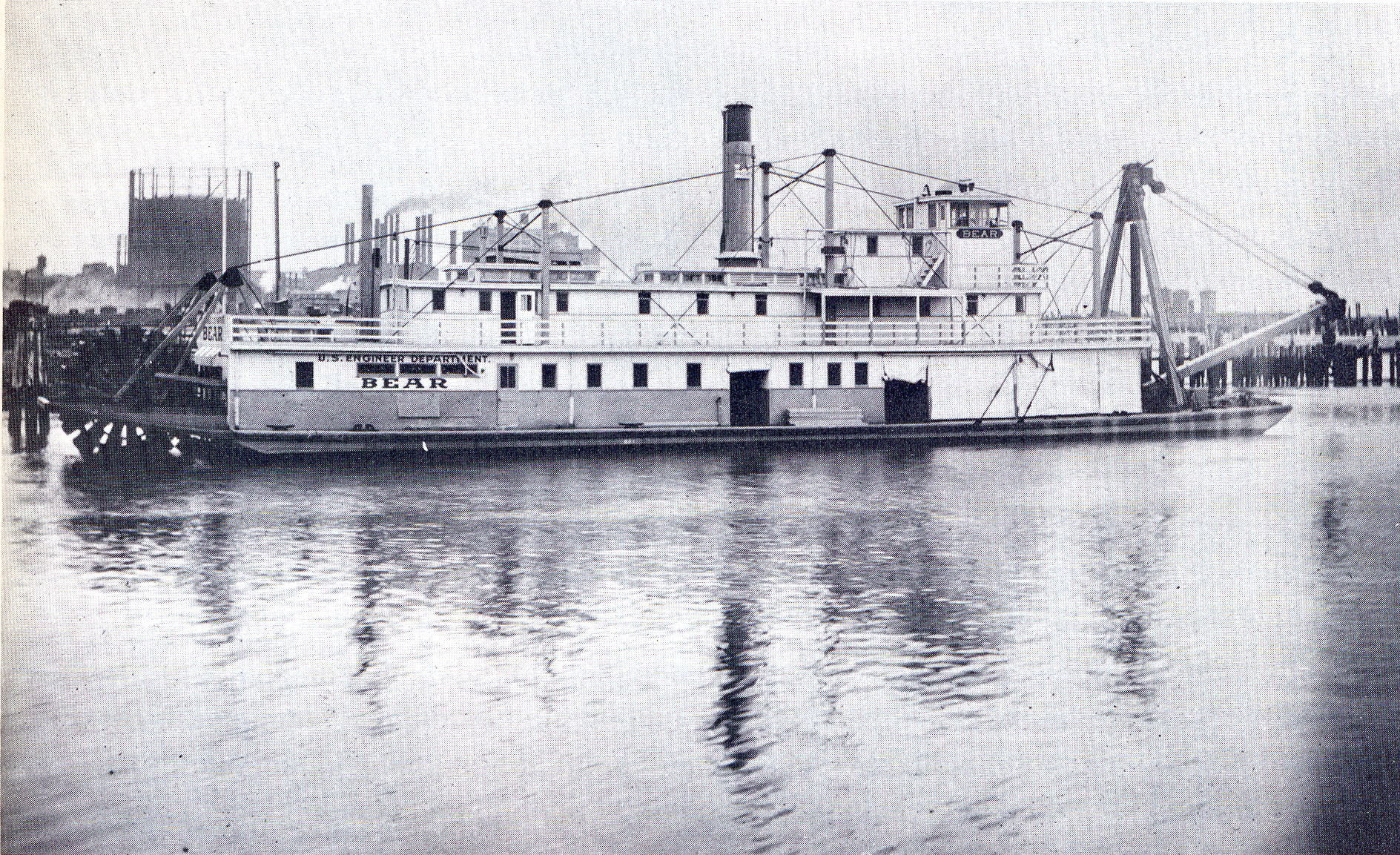
- The snagboat Bear which operated on the Sacramento River

United States
- Name: Bear
- Namesake: Bear River
- Owner: U.S. Army Corps of Engineers
- Awarded: 1919
- Builder: Schultz & Schultz, San Francisco, California
- Completed: 1921
- Commissioned: 1921
- Reclassified: Barracks ship, 1926
- Homeport: Sacramento
- Fate: unknown

General characteristics
- Type: snagboat
- Tonnage: 242 GRT
- Length: 157 ft 9 in (48.08 m) o/a
- Beam: 35 ft 8 in (10.87 m)
- Draught: 4 ft 6 in (1.37 m)

Bear was a wooden-hulled, stern-wheel steamship that served as a snagboat for the United States Army Corps of Engineers.

== History ==
Bear was a stern-wheeled, shallow draft steamship ordered by the United States Army Corps of Engineers) to serve as a snagboat on the Sacramento, the Mokelumne, and the San Joaquin Rivers. Her namesake was the Bear River, a tributary of the Mokelumne River. She was designed to replace the first snagboat on the Sacramento River, Seizer (240 GRT) operating since 1881. In 1919, a contract was awarded to Schultz & Schultz of San Francisco who won with a bid of $117,000. She was completed in 1921. She was damaged on the Sacramento River after striking an obstacle in 1926 and sank in 4 feet of water. As the more powerful snagboat Yuba (410 GRT) had been completed in 1925, it was decided to not retain her in her former role. Her equipment was sold, and she was ultimately refloated and repaired at a cost of $15,059 to serve as a quarter boat.
