= Dwayne Ijames =

American football player (born 1983)

Profile
- Position: Defensive back

Personal information
- Born: December 4, 1983 (age 42); Albany, New York, U.S.
- Listed height: 5 ft 10 in (1.78 m)
- Listed weight: 190 lb (86 kg)

Career information
- College: Elon
- NFL draft: 2006: undrafted

Career history
- Cleveland Browns (2006)*; Laredo Lobos (2007); Corpus Christi Sharks (2008)
- * Offseason or practice squad member only

Awards and highlights
- 2004 Second-team All-Southern Conference Defensive Back Southern Conference; 2005 Second-team All-Southern Conference Defensive Back Southern Conference; 2005 Second-team All-Southern Conference Return Specialist Southern Conference; 2005 Football Gazette Second-team All-Southeast Region Defensive Back Southern Conference; Finished 1st in the Southern Conference in Passes Defended in 2004 Southern Conference; Finished tied for 2nd in the Southern Conference in Interceptions in 2004; Finished 1st in the Southern Conference in Punt Returns in 2005(39th NCAA-IAA); Finished 2nd in the Southern Conference in Kickoff Returns in 2005(10th NCAA-IAA)

Dwayne Ijames (born December 4, 1983) is an American former football defensive back. He was raised in Pickensville, Alabama, and Winston-Salem, North Carolina. He was signed by the Cleveland Browns as an undrafted free agent in 2006. He played college football at Elon University.

Ijames also a member of the Laredo Lobos and Corpus Christi Sharks.

== Professional career ==
=== Cleveland Browns ===
Ijames was originally signed by the Browns as an undrafted free agent out of Elon. However, Ijames was waived by the team after rookie camp.

=== Laredo Lobos ===
In 2007, Ijames signed with the Laredo Lobos, an af2 expansion team in Laredo, Texas. While playing with the Lobos, Dwayne played in 11 games and was the team leader in tackles and interceptions. Ijames finished with 55 tackles 6 interceptions 1 forced fumble 1 fumble recovery and 11 pass break-ups.

=== Corpus Christi Sharks ===
In 2008, Ijames signed with the Corpus Christi Sharks in Corpus Christi, Texas. Ijames played in 15 games and was the team leader in interceptions. Ijames finished with 65 tackles 1 tackle for loss 1 forced fumble 2 fumble recoveries 12 pass break-ups and 7 interception, 1 for a touchdown.
