= Complex early seral forest =

Type of ecosystem present after a major disturbance

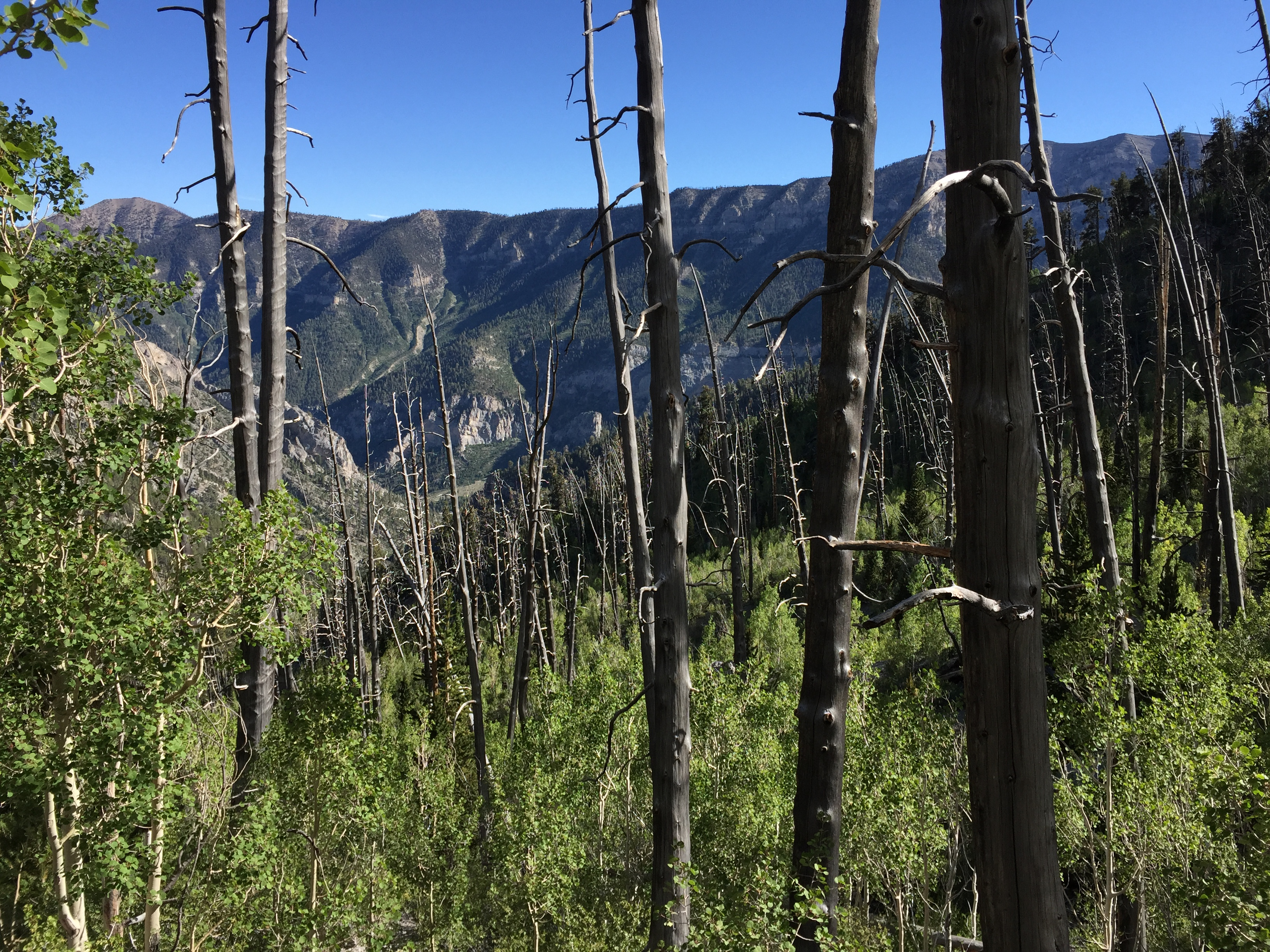
Complex early seral forest, also called snag forest, of burned trees and Aspen sprouts in the Mount Charleston Wilderness, Nevada

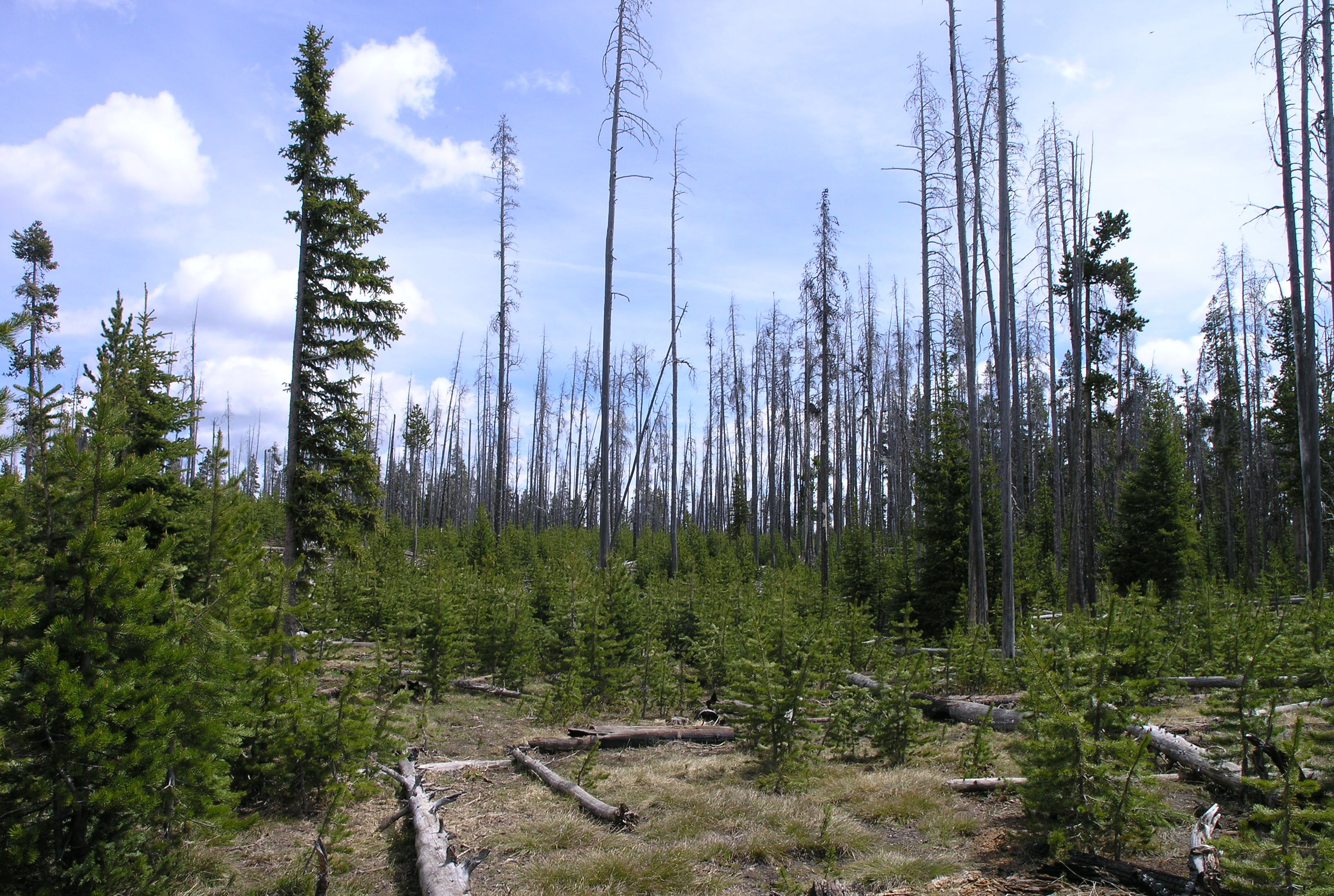
Complex early seral forest, or snag forest, in Yellowstone National Park

Complex early seral forests, or snag forests, are ecosystems that occupy potentially forested sites after a stand-replacement disturbance and before re-establishment of a closed forest canopy. They are generated by natural disturbances such as wildfire or insect outbreaks that reset ecological succession processes and follow a pathway that is influenced by biological legacies (e.g., large live trees and snags, downed logs, seed banks, resprout tissue, fungi, and other live and dead biomass) that were not removed during the initial disturbance. Complex early seral forests develop with rich biodiversity because the remaining biomass provides resources to many life forms and because of habitat heterogeneity provided by the disturbances that generated them. In this and other ways, complex early seral forests differ from simplified early successional forests created by logging. Complex early seral forest habitat is threatened from fire suppression, thinning, and post-fire or post-insect outbreak logging.

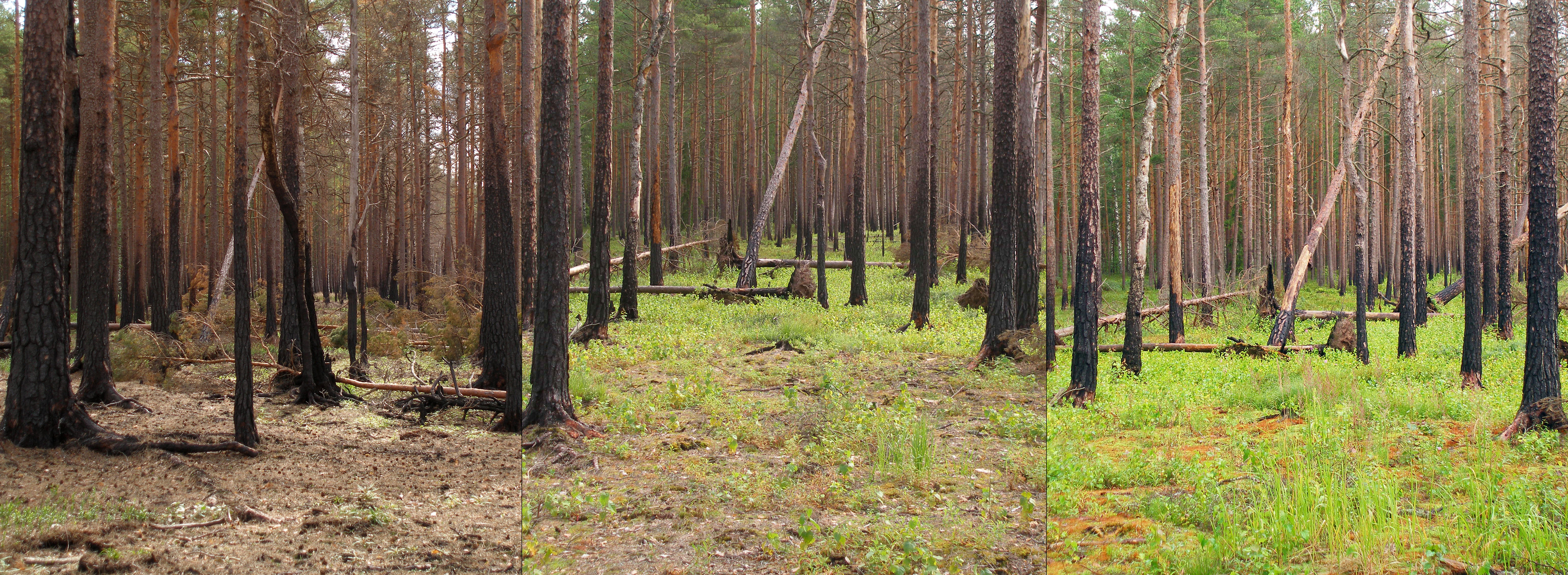
Complex early seral forest in boreal forest 1, 2, and 3 years post fire

== Ecology ==
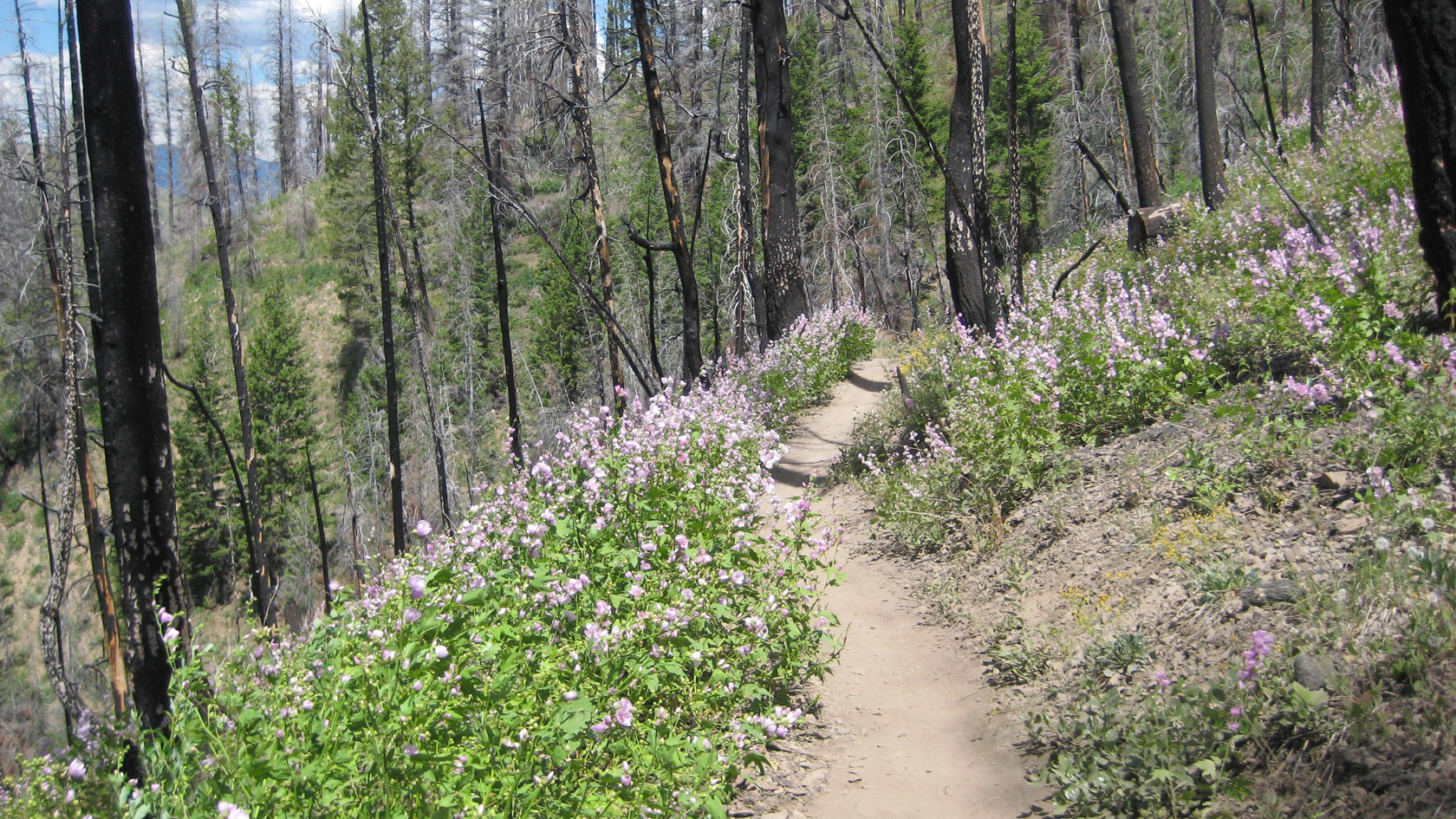
Flowers blooming in complex early seral forest

Complex early seral forests are structurally more complex, contain more large trees and snags, and have more diverse understories, more functional ecosystem processes, and more diverse gene pools than areas of timber harvest. These characteristics provide greater resilience in the face of climate change than that provided by the simplified early seral forests produced by logging. Complex early seral forest attributes promote a high level of species richness, particularly bird communities that utilize these forests extensively.

The residual biomass of snags reduces disturbance stress and provides for the rapid proliferation of new life For example, seed banks and live vegetation tissue gives rise to dense forb cover, abundant grasses, and shrubs – especially nitrogen fixers (e.g., Ceanothus spp.) and ectomycorrhizal associates (e.g., Manzanita spp.) that facilitate conifer growth. Closed cone conifers like giant sequoia also do well in these forests. Other plants that can abundantly colonize burns, such as conifers and fireweed, arrive by wind or animal dispersed seed. Plant species richness of snag forests can be much higher than in unburned forests.

Bird and small mammal communities that utilize complex early seral forests forage on the abundant insects and increased abundance of seeds in the post-fire flora. These species, in turn, support an increase in raptors. Bird species such as the Black-backed Woodpecker, Olive-sided Flycatcher (Contopus cooperi), Mountain Bluebird (Sialia currucoides), Chipping Sparrow (Spizella passerina), and Mountain Quail (Oreortyx pictus) achieve highest abundances in complex early seral forests. Bats (Myotis, Idionycteris, Lasionycteris, and Eptesicus) also use complex early seral forests because of greater insect prey as well as suitable roosts. Stand-replacing fires stimulate an increased flow of aquatic prey to terrestrial habitats, driving increases in riparian consumers. The trees killed by fire are beneficial to the ecological integrity of stream communities because they are a main source of large woody debris inputs. There is also reproduction by some forest fungi species that are restricted to burns (e.g., morels, Morchella spp.) and the dead wood provides substrate for fungal growth that supports many arthropod species, including unique fire-following native beetles. Beetles, in general, colonize fire-killed trees in complex early seral forests and their abundant larvae support species like Black-backed Woodpeckers Forest and Spotted Owl management documents often state that severe wildfire is a cause of recent declines in populations of spotted owls poses a primary threat to Spotted Owl population viability, but a systematic review and meta-analysis found fires created more benefits than costs for spotted owls.

== See also ==
- Seral community
