= Snagboat =

Type of river boat

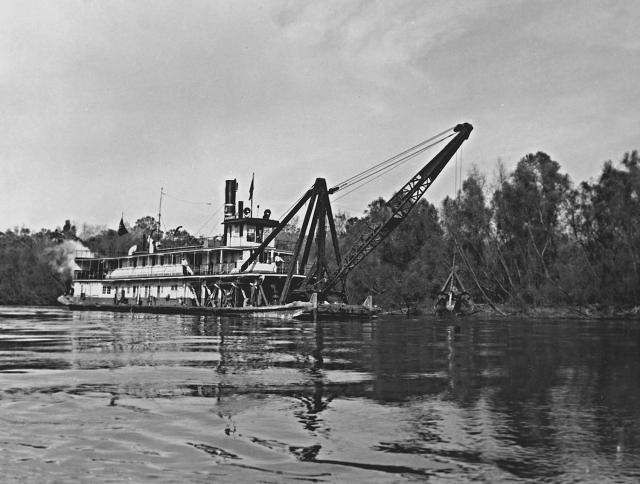
The snagboat Montgomery on the Apalachicola River, Florida, during the early 1900s.

A snagboat is a river boat, resembling a barge with superstructure for crew accommodations, and deck-mounted cranes and hoists for removing snags and other obstructions from rivers and other shallow waterways.

== USA ==
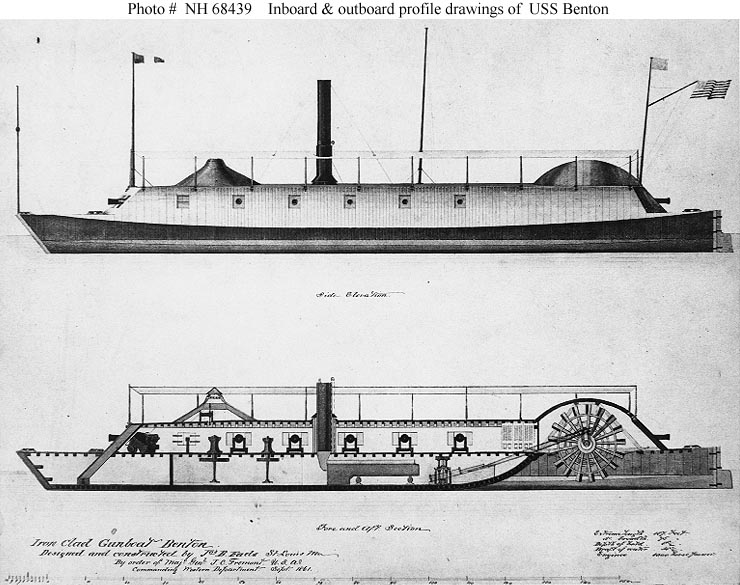
Drawing of USS Benton

During the American Civil War, when much of the naval fighting was done on rivers and their tributaries, numerous snagboats were in operation. USS Benton, for example, was a commercial snagboat quickly converted by the Union Army to a river gunboat when the American Civil War broke out.

=== Snagboats of the USA ===
Bear was a wooden-hulled, stern-wheel steamship that served as a snagboat for the United States Army Corps of Engineers.

Seizer was a wooden-hulled, stern-wheel steamship that served as the first snagboat for the United States Army Corps of Engineers on the Sacramento River.

W. T. Preston is a specialized sternwheeler that operated as a snagboat, removing log jams and natural debris that prevented river navigation on several Puget Sound-area rivers. She is now the centerpiece of the Snagboat Heritage Center in Anacortes, Washington. She was designated a National Historic Landmark in 1989.

Yuba was a stern-wheeled, shallow draft steamship ordered by the United States Army Corps of Engineers) to serve as a snagboat on the Sacramento River after the Seizer (240 GRT, 1881), had retired in 1921

=== Great Raft ===
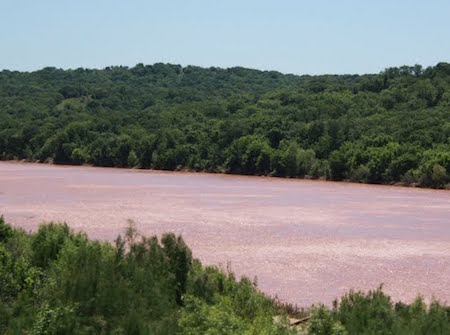
Red River, Texas

In the early 19th century, settlers found that much of the Red River's length in Louisiana was unnavigable because of a collection of fallen trees that formed a Great Raft over 160 miles (260 km) long. In 1839, Captain Henry Miller Shreve began clearing the log jam, but it was not completely cleared until the 1870s, when dynamite became available. The river was thereafter navigable, but north of Natchitoches it was restricted to small craft. Removal of the raft further connected the Red and Atchafalaya rivers, accelerating the development of the Atchafalaya River channel.

== Canada ==
In Canada, many of the rivers of British Columbia were maintained and kept open for navigation by federal Department of Public Works snagboats. On the Fraser River, in southern British Columbia, a series of sternwheeler snagboats named Samson were operated by the Canadian Federal Government from the early 1880s until the retirement of final vessel in the series, the Samson V in 1980. The Samson V is now preserved as a museum on the waterfront of New Westminster, B.C. and was the last steam -powered stern-wheeler to operate in Canada. In northern British Columbia, Department of Public Works snagboats operated out of Prince Rupert and cleared the waters of the Nass, Ecstall, and Skeena rivers.

The snag-clearance service was mainly important on the Fraser River because of the large amount of marine traffic. Passenger and freight-carrying sternwheelers operated out of New Westminster from 1859 until the early 1920s. These lightly built vessels were vulnerable to the woody debris and drift logs that would wash down the river with every spring freshet. After the 1920s, most of the traffic on the Fraser was tug and barge service along with deep sea shipping in the lower reaches of the river, and a greater portion of the snagboat's assignments was in maintenance of government docks and aids to navigation. In northern British Columbia, as on the Fraser River, a major part of the snagboat service provided by the Canadian federal government was in support of the gillnet salmon-fishing industry and the canneries that were built in and around the estuaries of the major rivers. Huge amounts of timber debris would wash down-river every year creating hazards for fishermen and destroying nets.

== Gallery ==
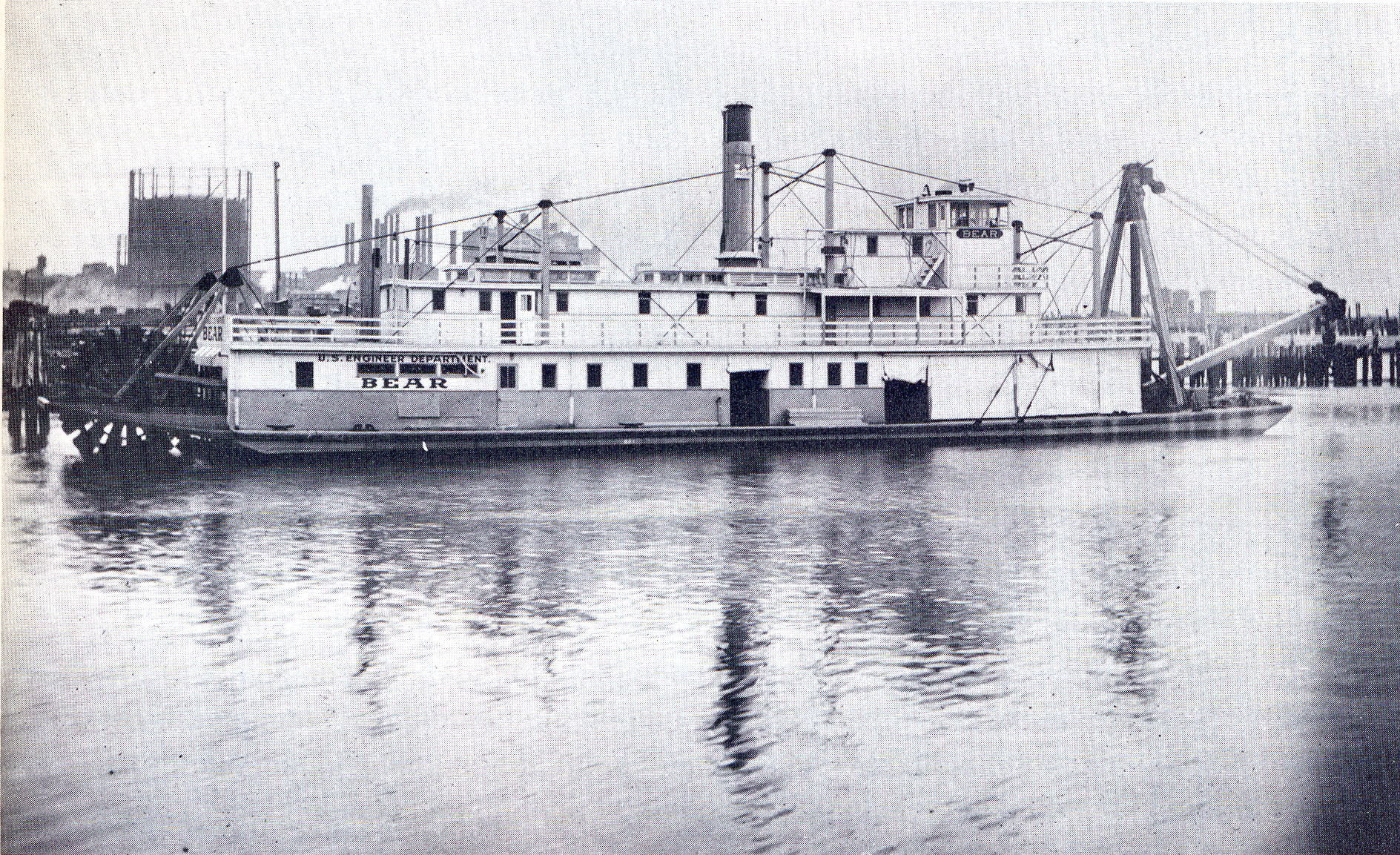
The snagboat Bear which operated on the Sacramento River (1920s)

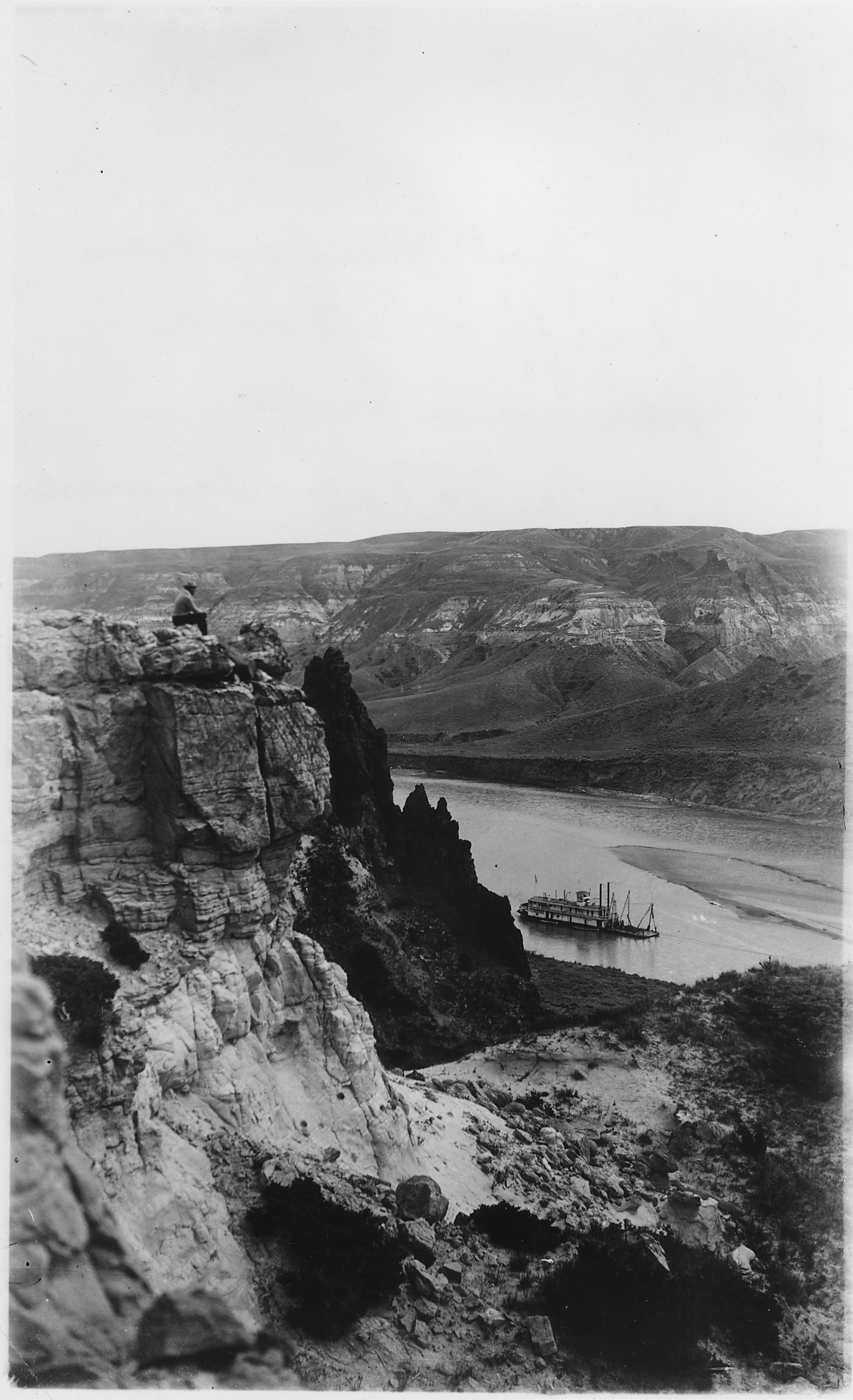
The snagboat Mandan seen from a bluff overlooking the Missouri River (July 1912).

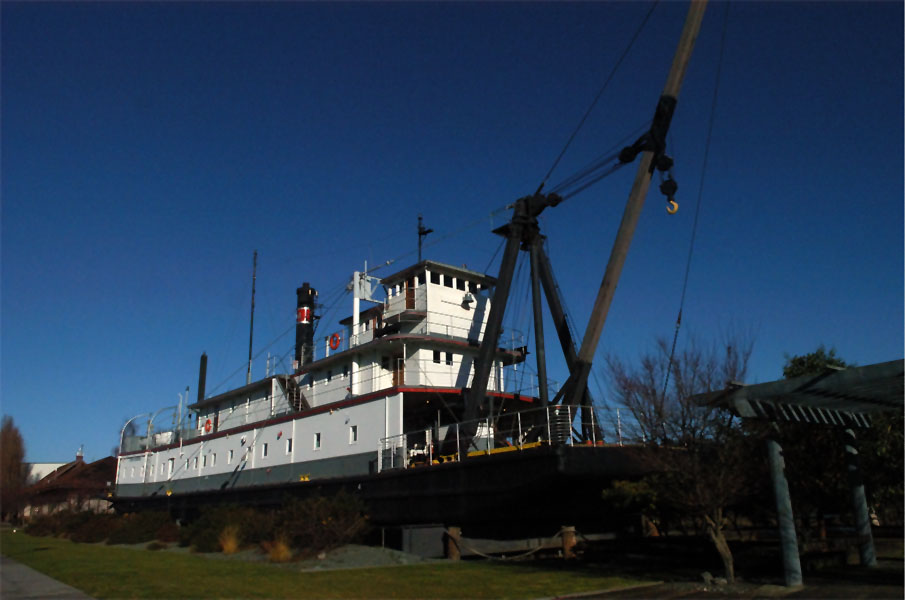
The snagboat W. T. Preston (retired)

== See also ==
- Montgomery
- WT Preston
- Yuba
