= Montgomery (snagboat) =

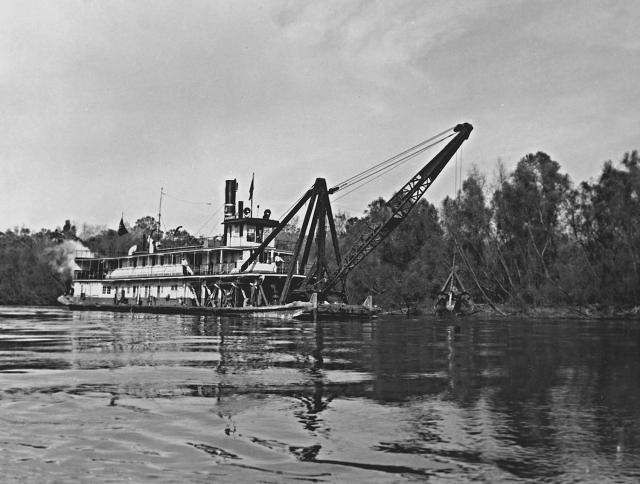
- Montgomery on the Apalachicola River.

History

United States
- Builder: Charleston Dry Dock and Machine Company
- Launched: 1925
- Out of service: November 8, 1982
- Status: Museum ship

General characteristics
- Length: 178 ft (54 m) LOA
- Beam: 34 ft 3 in (10.44 m)
- Depth: 6 ft (1.8 m)
- Installed power: Steam
- Propulsion: Sternwheel
- Montgomery (snagboat)
- U.S. National Register of Historic Places
- U.S. National Historic Landmark
- Location within Alabama
- Location: Pickensville, Alabama
- Coordinates: 33°12′44″N 88°17′10″W
- Built: 1925
- Architect: Charleston Drydock & Machine Co.
- NRHP reference No.: 83003521

Significant dates
- Added to NRHP: November 28, 1983
- Designated NHL: June 30, 1989

Montgomery is a steam-powered sternwheel-propelled snagboat built in 1925 by the Charleston Dry Dock and Machine Company of Charleston, South Carolina, and operated by the United States Army Corps of Engineers. Montgomery cleared snags and obstructions from the Coosa, Alabama, Apalachicola, Chattahoochee, Flint, Black Warrior, and Tombigbee Rivers until her retirement from the Corps of Engineers on November 8, 1982. She was restored in 1984 and again in 2004. One of only two surviving Army Corps of Engineers snagboats (along with W.T. Preston), she was declared a National Historic Landmark in 1989. Montgomery now operates as a museum ship at the Tom Bevill Lock and Dam Visitor Center in Pickensville, Alabama.

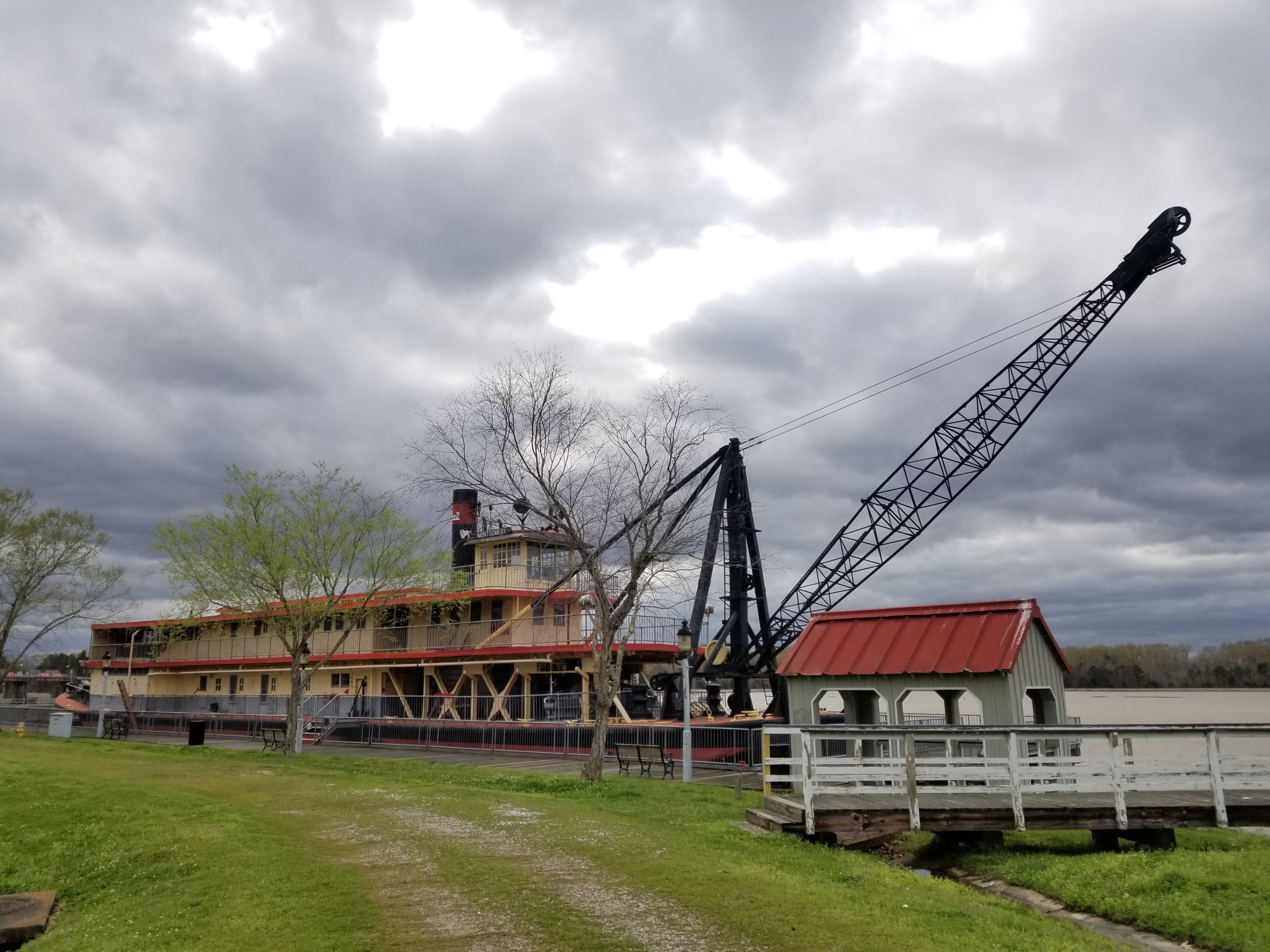
Montgomery docked at Pickensville in 2021

Montgomery is built out of steel plates mounted in a steel frame. Her hull is 156 feet (48 m) long, which extends to 178 feet (54 m) with the addition of the sternwheel. She is 34 feet 3 inches (10.44 m) wide, and has a hold depth of 6 feet (1.8 m). She has a scow-shaped bow and a flat bottom with no keel. She is designed to hold machinery anywhere along the hull length, and to withstand the stresses of pulling on snags. Rows of steel I-beams support its superstructure, including the forward-mounted boom, mounted on an A-frame. The frame is designed to support different types of equipment, including bucket dredges as well as the snag boom. The boom is maneuvered by steam-powered winches, and there are steam-powered capstans to assist in stabilize the boat while snagging. The pilot house is set on a deck above the boilers.

== See also ==
- WT Preston
- List of National Historic Landmarks in Alabama
