= Jack's Stir Brew Coffee =

Coffeehouse in New York City

Coordinates: 40.7345°N 74.0006°W

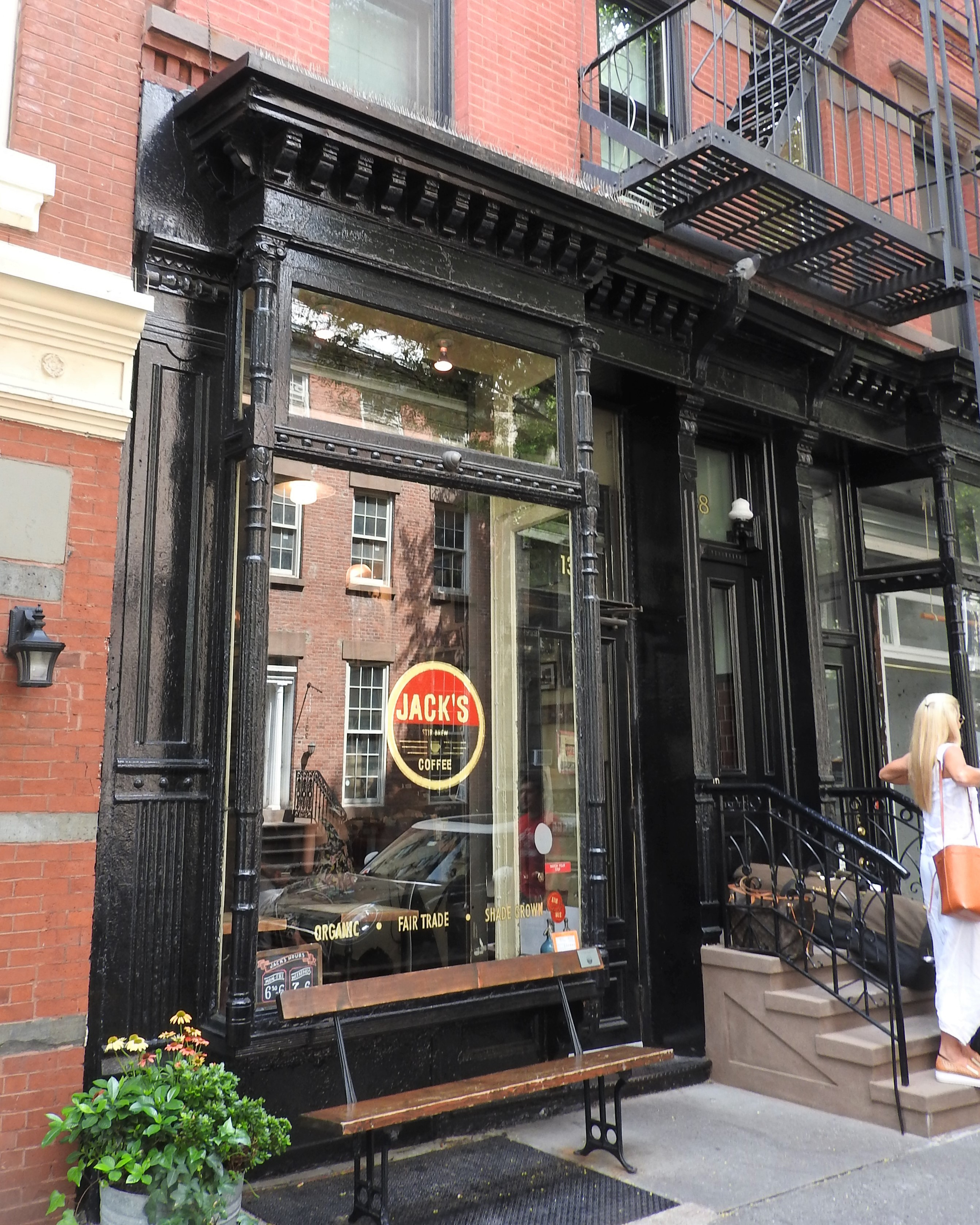
First shop, West 10th Street

Jack's Stir Brew Coffee is a coffeehouse chain with seven locations in and around New York City. The first location was opened by owner Jack Mazzola in 2003. It was the first organic, fair trade, shade-grown coffee shop in New York. The coffee is prepared using the house-created "Stir Brew" method. Jack's Stir Brew Coffee also retails vegan baked goods.

== History ==
Jack Mazzola invented and patented the Stir Brewer. This patented machine automatically agitates the grounds through a standard drip coffee process to reveal smoother and richer flavors than standard drip coffee.

Jack's Stir Brew Coffee opened its first store on 10th Street in New York City in 2003. The South Street Seaport location opened in 2005, and its café on Amagansett Square in 2011 (which sells more products and including its own clothing line launched in 2014).

In 2012, the Front Street location was destroyed in Hurricane Sandy. The Downing Street location opened the following year and launched Jack's baked goods activities. New locations opened inside the Roxy Hotel in New York City and in Sag Harbor, NY in 2016.

The place is known to have a few NY celebrities as regulars (Hilary Swank, Jerry Seinfeld, Alec Baldwin).

In September 2022, Jack's Stir Coffee Brew (seven coffee shops) merged with Vin Sur Vingt Wine Bars (eight wine bars) to form the hospitality group TenEleven Hospitality.

== Acclaim ==
Time Out New York named Jack's Best Indie Coffeehouse.

== Locations ==
Manhattan

- 10th Street - 138 West 10th Street, New York, NY 10014
- Reade Street - 139 Reade St., New York, NY 10013
- Tribeca - 2 6th Ave. (Avenue of the Americas), New York, NY 10013
- Hudson Yards - 20 Hudson Yards, New York, NY 10001

Long Island

- Amagansett - 146 Montauk Hwy, Amagansett, NY 11930
- Sag Harbor - 51 Division St., Sag Harbor, NY 11963

New Canaan, CT

- New Canaan - 96 Main St., New Canaan, CT 06840
