= W. O. Decker =

- U.S. National Register of Historic Places
- New York State Register of Historic Places
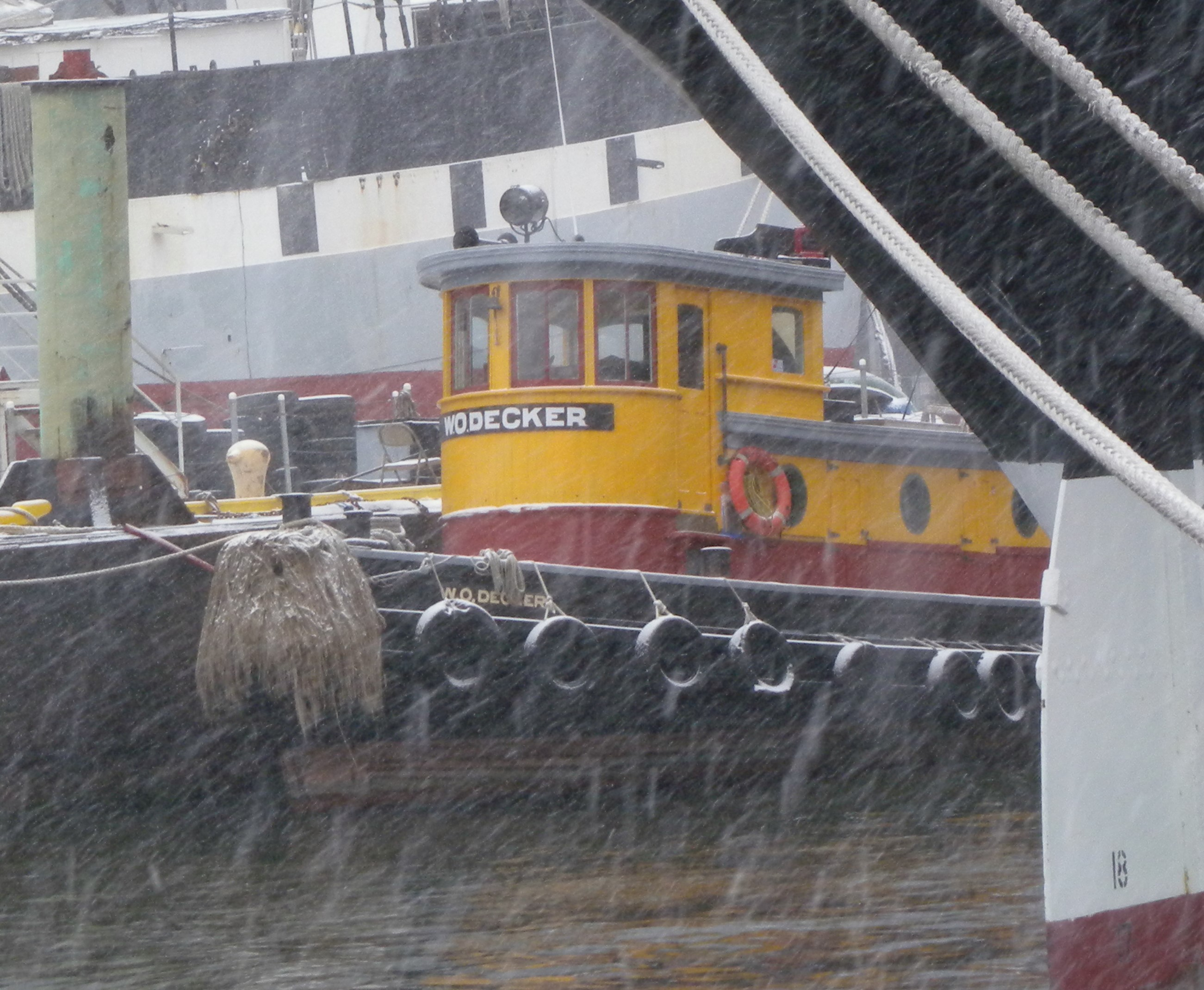
- During a snowstorm

- Location within Lower Manhattan Location within New York Location within the United States
- Location: Pier 16, South Street Seaport, New York, New York
- Coordinates: 40°42′19″N 74°0′11″W
- Built: 1930
- Architects: Russell & Co.
- NRHP reference No.: 96000962
- NYSRHP No.: 06101.008627

Significant dates
- Added to NRHP: September 13, 1996
- Designated NYSRHP: July 10, 1996

W. O. Decker is a 52-foot (16 m) wooden tugboat built in Long Island City in 1930 as Russell I for the Newtown Creek Towing Company. The Decker tugboat company on Staten Island bought and renamed the boat in 1946. She was originally steam powered before being refitted with a 175-horsepower (130 kW) diesel engine. In 1986, she was donated to the South Street Seaport Museum in Manhattan, where she remains today. She was added to the National Register of Historic Places on September 13, 1996. She was restored in 2018.

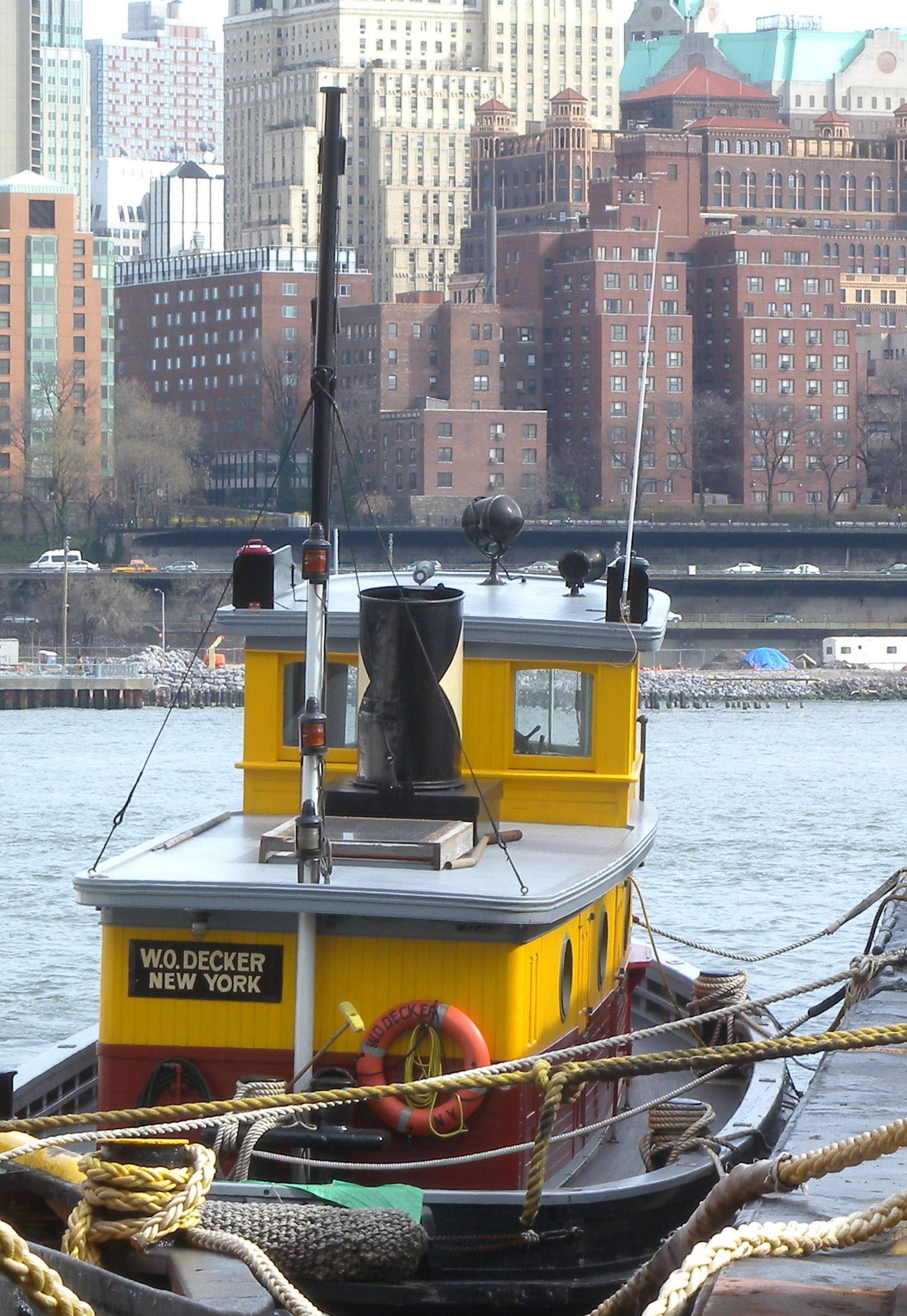
Aft view in fair weather
