= Pioneer (schooner) =

1895 schooner

Coordinates: 40.7047°N 74.0025°W

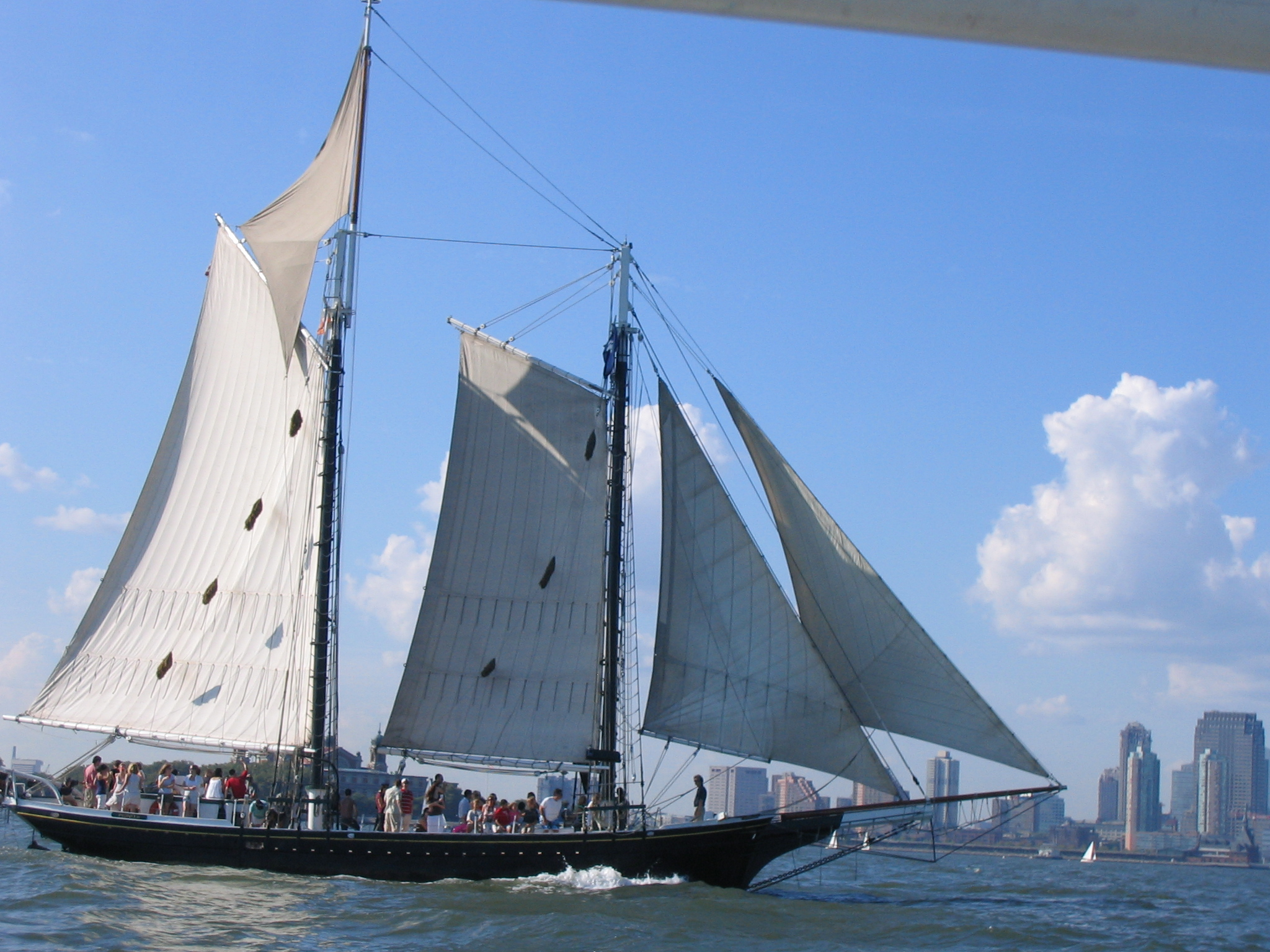
- Pioneer in New York Harbor

History

United States
- Name: Pioneer
- Owner: South Street Seaport Museum
- Completed: 1885, Marcus Hook, Pennsylvania
- Refit: 1895 (sloop->schooner); around 1930 (outfitted w/engine & downrigged); 1966 (schooner rig restored, hull rebuilt)
- Status: Sea-going museum ship

General characteristics
- Tonnage: 43 GT
- Length: 102 ft (31 m) overall
- Beam: 21 ft 6 in (6.55 m)
- Height: 76.6 ft (23.3 m)
- Draft: 12 ft (3.7 m) w/centerboard, 4.5 ft (1.4 m) w/o
- Propulsion: Sail; auxiliary diesel engine
- Sail plan: Two-masted schooner, 2,737 square feet (254.3 m^{2}) total sail area
- Notes: Originally iron-hulled; currently steel-hulled with iron frames

Pioneer is a restored nineteenth century schooner that sails out of the South Street Seaport in New York, New York.

== History ==
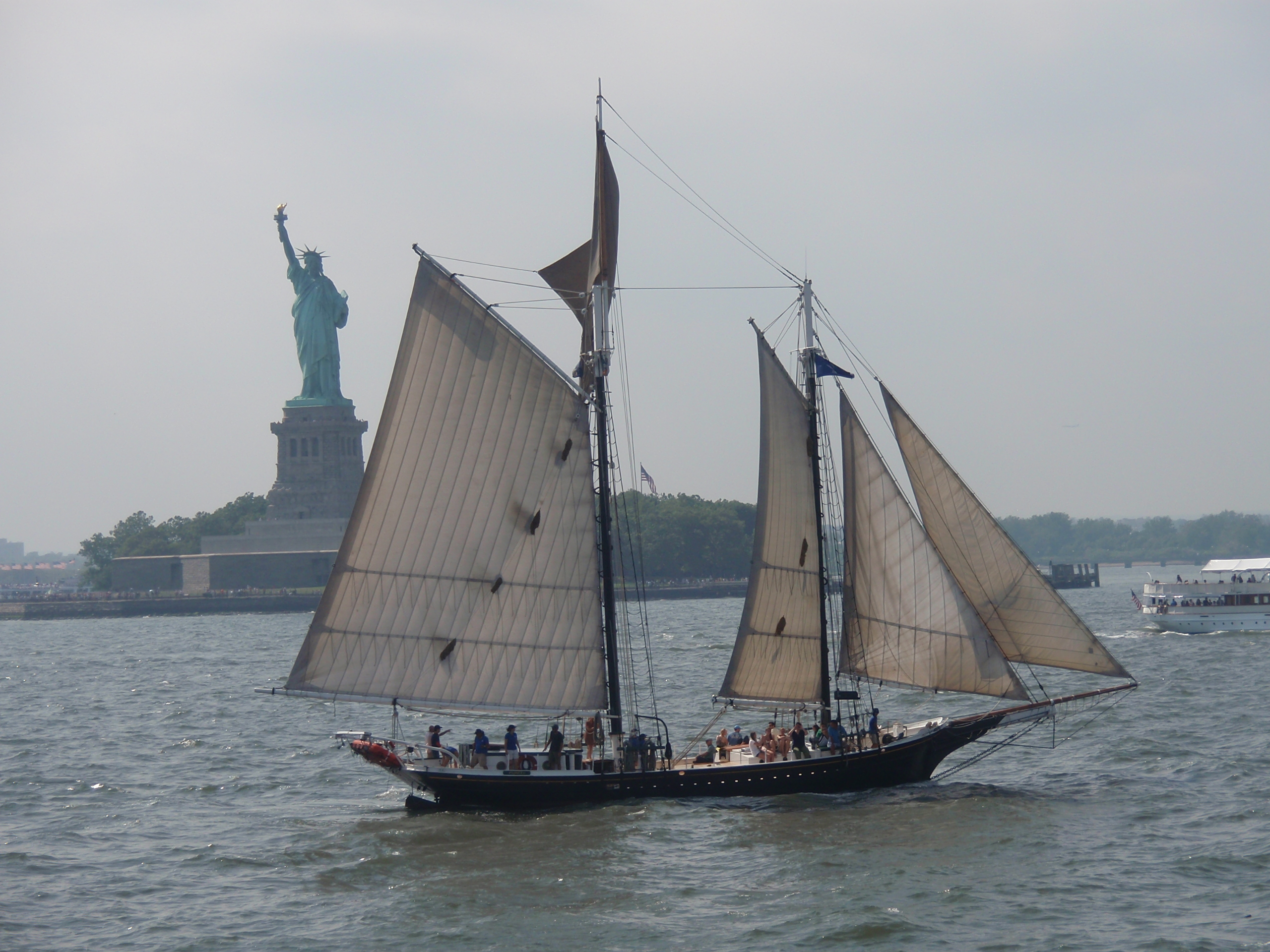
Schooner Pioneer sailing near Statue of Liberty, 2010

The Pioneer was built in Marcus Hook, Pennsylvania in 1885 as a cargo sloop. She was the first of only two American cargo sloops ever built with a wrought iron hull. After ten years of service in the Delaware Bay, she was re-rigged as a schooner for easier handling.

In 1930, the Pioneer was sold to a buyer in Massachusetts. By this point, she had been fitted with an engine and no longer being used as a sailing vessel. She was sold again in 1966 to Russell Grinnell Jr. of Gloucester for use in his dock building business. Grinnell restored Pioneer's schooner rig and rebuilt her hull in steel plating, leaving the iron frame intact. Upon his death in 1970, he donated the Pioneer to the South Street Seaport Museum. Pioneer sails seasonally from South Street Seaport in Manhattan, offering daily sails to the public as well as charter sails and educational programs for children. The crew is a combination of professionals and volunteers.

== Popular culture ==
The Pioneer appears in Episode 1 of Season 1 of the HBO series Boardwalk Empire, in a scene set on the water showing illegal liquor being transported by boat.

== See also ==
- List of schooners
