= Wavertree (ship) =

Iron-hulled sailing ship built in 1885

- U.S. National Register of Historic Places
- New York State Register of Historic Places
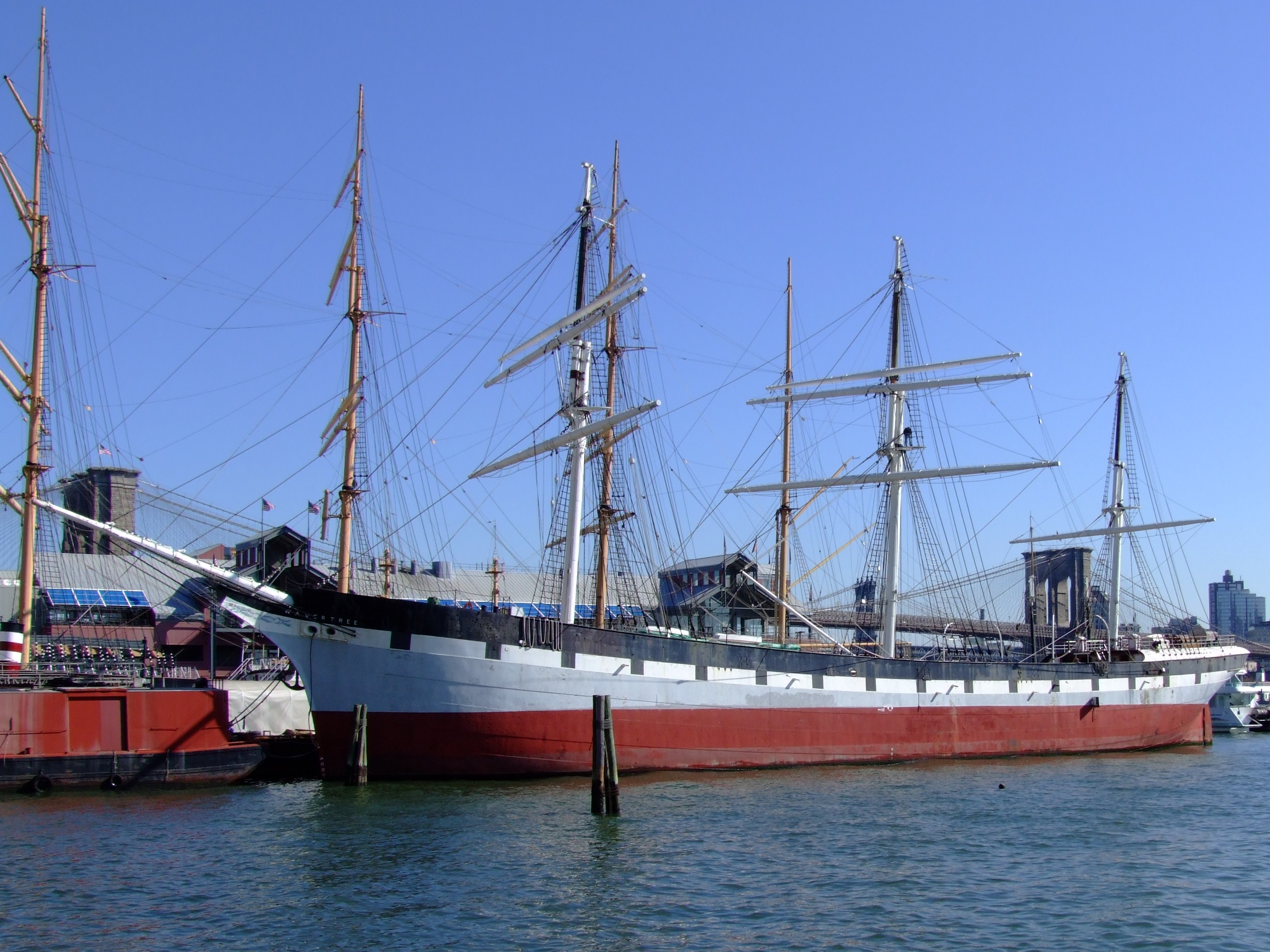

- Location within Lower Manhattan Location within New York Location within the United States
- Location: Pier 17, foot of Fulton St., New York, New York
- Coordinates: 40°42′20″N 74°0′10″W
- Built: 1885
- Architects: Oswald, Mordaunt & Co.
- NRHP reference No.: 78001887
- NYSRHP No.: 06101.000680

Significant dates
- Added to NRHP: June 13, 1978
- Designated NYSRHP: June 23, 1980

Wavertree is a historic iron-hulled sailing ship built in 1885. Now the largest wrought iron sailing vessel afloat, it is located at the South Street Seaport in New York City.

== History ==
Wavertree was built in Southampton, England, in 1885 and was one of the last large sailing ships built of wrought iron. Originally called 'Southgate' she was built by Oswald Mordaunt in 1885 for Chadwick and Pritchard. She was renamed Wavertree when the Liverpool company R.W. Leyland & Company took her over, Wavertree being a district of that city.

The ship was first used to carry jute between eastern India and Scotland. When less than two years old the ship entered the "tramp trades", taking cargoes anywhere in the world. In 1910, after sailing for a quarter century, the ship was dis-masted off Cape Horn and barely made it to the Falkland Islands. Rather than re-rigging the ship its owners sold it for use as a floating warehouse at Punta Arenas, Chile. Wavertree was converted into a sand barge at Buenos Aires, Argentina in 1947. This ship was discovered in 1967 at the Riachuelo River in Buenos Aires by an American citizen working on a sand barge and acquired by the South Street Seaport Museum in 1968. The ship was sent to the Arsenal Naval Buenos Aires for restoration. In 1969 after restoration was complete, the ship was towed to New York. The vessel was added to the National Register of Historic Places on June 13, 1978.

=== Restoration ===
In 2015, the ship was sent to Staten Island's Caddell Dry Dock and Repair Co. Inc. for a $13 million restoration, funded by New York City's Department of Cultural Affairs, city council and Manhattan's borough president. The restoration included the replacement of steel plates below the waterline, a new ballast system, updated electrical systems, and coating work that includes a cathodic protection system. The restoration started in May 2015, and ended on September 25, 2016, when the ship returned to South Street Seaport museum.
