= United States lightship Ambrose (LV-87) =

1907 lightvessel

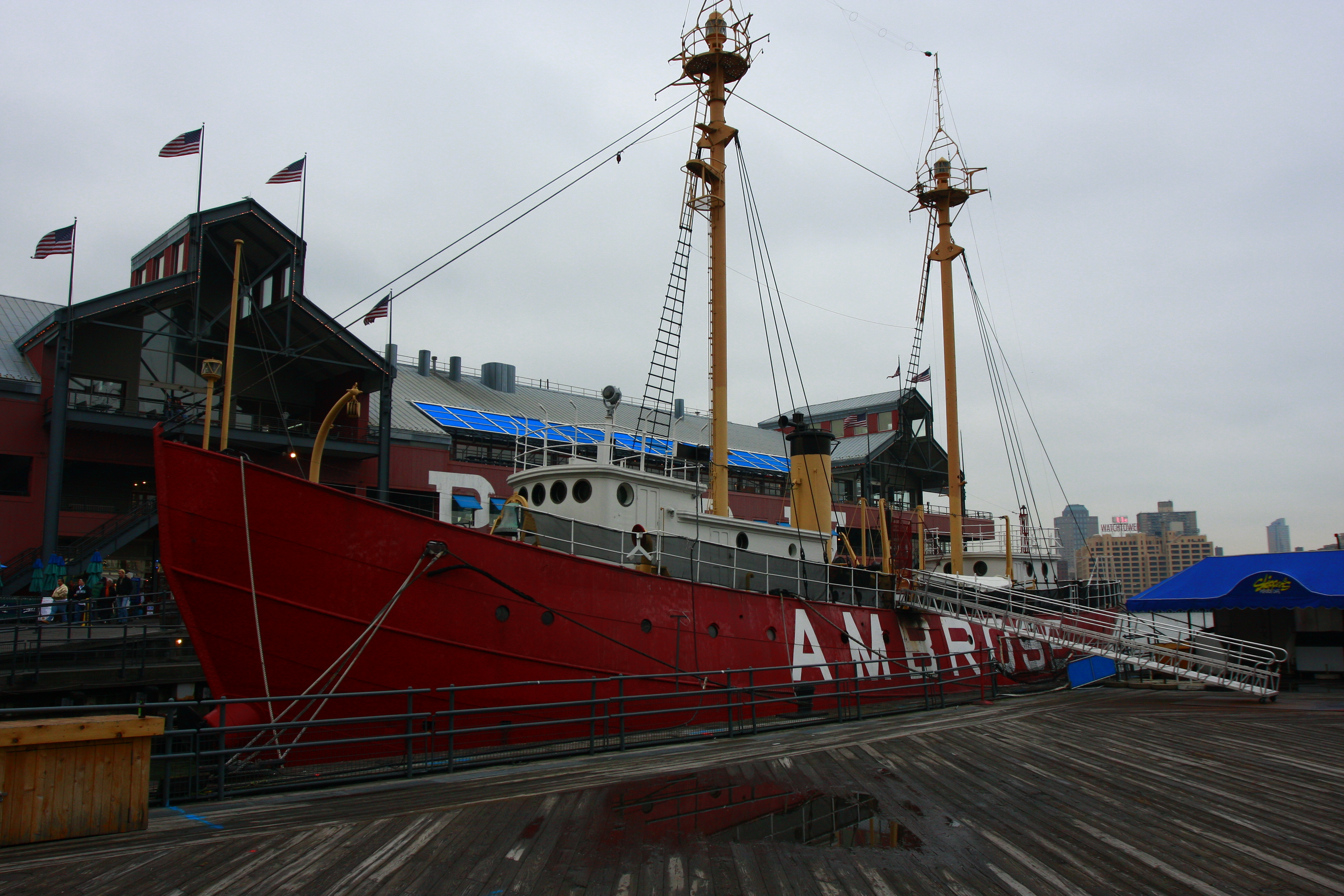

History

United States
- Name: LV-87
- Operator: United States Coast Guard
- Builder: New York Shipbuilding Corporation of Camden, New Jersey
- Cost: $99,000.00 US
- Completed: 1907
- Decommissioned: March 4, 1966
- Refit: 1932-1933
- Nickname(s): Ambrose
- Fate: Donated on August 4, 1968, for use as floating exhibit at South Street Seaport, New York City.

General characteristics
- Type: Lightship
- Length: 135 ft 5 in (41.28 m)
- Beam: 29 ft (8.8 m)
- Draft: 12 ft 9 in (3.89 m)
- Depth of hold: 15 ft 4 in (4.67 m)
- Installed power: As constructed : One compound steam reciprocating engine; Bore: 16 in (410 mm) & 31 in (790 mm); Stroke: 24 in (610 mm); 325 IHP; Two 9 ft 3 in (2.82 m) diameter by 16 ft 4 in (4.98 m) long boilers; After 1932-1933 refit: Repowered with a Winton diesel engine; 300 HP
- Propulsion: As constructed: 7 ft 9 in (2.36 m) diameter propeller; After 1932-1933 refit: 5 ft (1.5 m) diameter propeller installed
- Speed: 10 kn (12 mph; 19 km/h)
- Notes: Signal lights; As constructed: Cluster of 3 oil lens lanterns on each masthead; 1908 through 1922; Converted multiple times from incandescent lights to arc lamps. From 1922 onward two 375mm lens incandescent lanterns of 15,000 cp were used.
- Ambrose (LV 87)
- U.S. National Register of Historic Places
- U.S. National Historic Landmark
- New York State Register of Historic Places
- Location within New York City Location within New York Location within the United States
- Location: Pier 16, East River, Manhattan, New York City, New York
- Coordinates: 40°42′17.44″N 74°0′8.88″W
- NRHP reference No.: 84002758
- NYSRHP No.: 06101.000653

Significant dates
- Added to NRHP: 7 September 1984
- Designated NHL: 11 April 1989
- Designated NYSRHP: 25 July 1984

The United States Lightship LV-87/WAL-512 (Ambrose) is a riveted steel lightship built in 1907 and served at the Ambrose Channel lightship station from December 1, 1908, until 1932, and in other posts until her decommissioning in 1966. It is one of a small number of preserved American lightships, and now serves as a museum ship at the South Street Seaport Museum in Lower Manhattan, New York City.

== History ==
In 1921, the first radio beacon in the United States was installed in the ship's radio shack. This addition greatly assisted ships navigating the congested Ambrose Channel in dense fog. LV-87 would also be the last steam-powered vessel to hold the Ambrose Channel post.

After the end of her Ambrose Channel assignment in 1932, LV-87 underwent a major refit, most significantly switching from steam propulsion to a direct drive Winton Diesel engine, as well as the removal of her anchor burton on her bow and a reorganization of her deck structures. Afterward, the ship was assigned to various posts which included being used as an examination vessel during World War II. Although her final post was at the Scotland Station she is commonly known by the name of her most famous station, Ambrose.

LV-87 was decommissioned on March 4, 1966, from the Coast Guard after 59 years of service. In 1968 she was given to the South Street Seaport Museum in Lower Manhattan. Currently she is moored at Pier 16 on the East River and is used as a floating exhibit. In April 1989, the lightship was declared a National Historic Landmark.

== See also ==
- Lightship Ambrose
- List of National Historic Landmarks in New York City
- National Register of Historic Places listings in Manhattan below 14th Street
