= South Street Seaport =

Historic district in Manhattan, New York

- South Street Seaport; South Street Seaport Historic District
- U.S. National Register of Historic Places
- U.S. Historic district
- New York State Register of Historic Places
- New York City Landmark
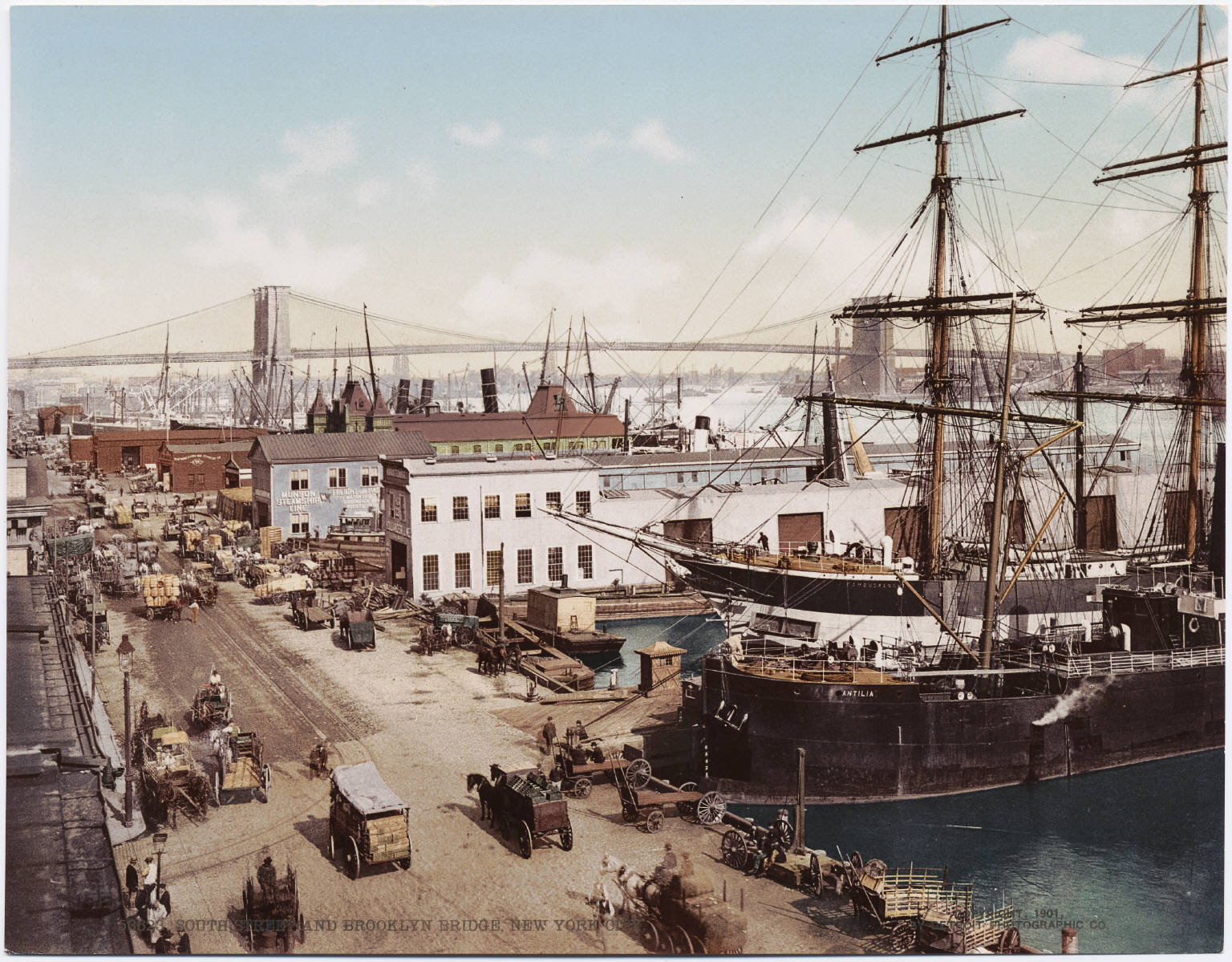
- South Street and Brooklyn Bridge (c. 1900)

- Location within Lower Manhattan Location within Manhattan Location within New York City Location within New York Location within the United States
- Location: South Street Seaport [original historic district]: Bounded by Burling (John St.) and Peck Slips, Water St. and East River; South Street Seaport Historic District [expansion]: Bounded by East River, Brooklyn Bridge, Fletcher Alley, and Pearl and South Streets; Manhattan, New York City, United States
- Coordinates: 40°42′22″N 74°0′12″W
- Area: 3.5 acres (1.4 ha) (first designation); 41 acres (17 ha) (second designation)
- Architect: multiple
- Architectural style: Greek Revival, Romanesque
- NRHP reference No.: 72000883, 78001884
- NYCL No.: 0948, 1646

Significant dates
- Added to NRHP: October 18, 1972 (first designation; #72000883); December 12, 1978 (second designation; #78001884)
- Designated NYSRHP: June 23, 1980
- Designated NYCL: May 11, 1977 (original), July 12, 1989 (extension)

The South Street Seaport is a historic area and neighborhood in the New York City borough of Manhattan, centered where Fulton Street meets the East River, within the Financial District of Lower Manhattan. The Seaport is a designated historic district. It is part of Manhattan Community Board 1 and is next to the East River to the southeast and the Two Bridges neighborhood to the northeast.

The district features some of the oldest buildings in Lower Manhattan, and includes the largest concentration of restored early 19th-century commercial buildings in the city. This includes renovated original mercantile buildings, renovated sailing ships, the former Fulton Fish Market, and modern tourist malls featuring food, shopping, and nightlife.

== History ==
=== Early history ===
==== 17th and 18th centuries ====
The first pier in the area appeared in 1625, when the Dutch West India Company founded an outpost there. With the influx of the first settlers, the area was quickly developed. One of the first and busiest streets in the area was today's Pearl Street, so named for a variety of coastal pearl shells. Due to its location, Pearl Street quickly gained popularity among traders. The East River was eventually narrowed. By the second half of the 17th century, the pier was extended to Water Street, then to Front Street, and by the beginning of the 19th century, to South Street. The pier was well reputed, as it was protected from the westerly winds and ice of the Hudson River.

In 1728, the Schermerhorn family established trade with the city of Charleston, South Carolina. Subsequently, rice and indigo came from Charleston. At the time, the port was also the focal point of delivery of goods from England. In 1776, during the American Revolutionary War, the British occupied the port, adversely affecting port trade for eight years. In 1783, many traders returned to England, and most port enterprises collapsed. The port quickly recovered from the post-war crisis. From 1797 until the middle of 19th century, New York had the country's largest system of maritime trade. From 1815 to 1860 the port was called the Port of New York.

On February 22, 1784, the Empress of China sailed from the port to Guangzhou and returned to Philadelphia on May 15, 1785, bringing along, in its cargo, green and black teas, porcelain, and other goods. This operation marked the beginning of trade relations between the newly formed United States and the Qing Empire.

==== Early and mid-19th century ====
On January 5, 1818, the 424-ton transatlantic packet James Monroe sailed from Liverpool, opening the first regular trans-Atlantic voyage route, the Black Ball Line. Shipping on this route continued until 1878. Commercially successful transatlantic traffic has led to the creation of many competing companies, including the Red Star Line in 1822. Transportation significantly contributed to the establishment New York as one of the centers of world trade.

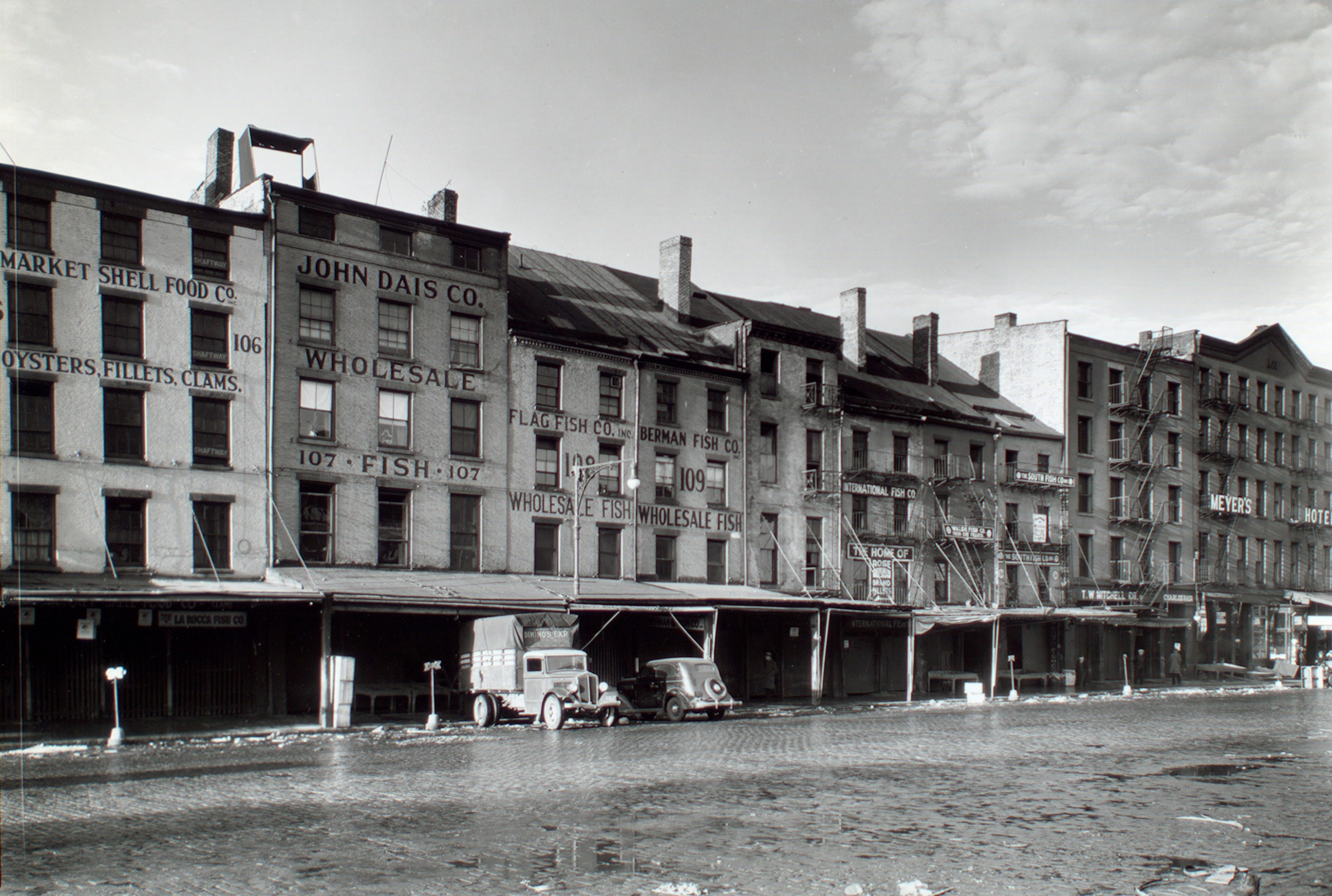
The Fish Market during the Great Depression

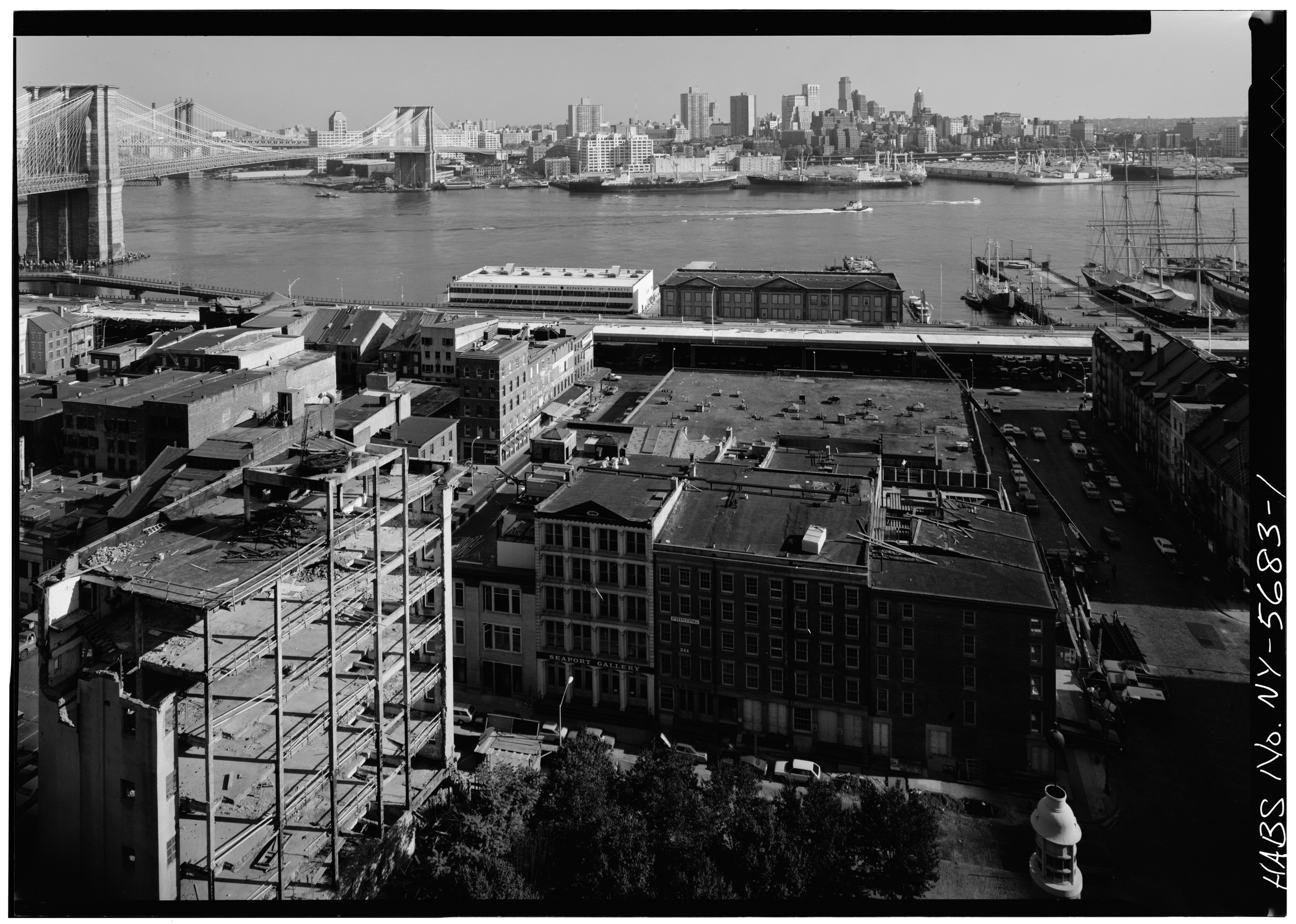
The port in the late 1970s

One of the largest companies in the South Street Seaport area was the Fulton Fish Market, opened in 1822. The Tin Building opened within the market in 1907; it is one of two remaining structures from the market and the only one that is officially designated as a landmark. In 2005, the market moved to Hunts Point, Bronx.

In November 1825, the Erie Canal, located upstate, was opened. The canal, connecting New York to the western United States, facilitated the economic development of the city. However, for this reason, along with the beginning of the shipping era, there was a need to lengthen the piers and deepen the port.

On the night of December 17, 1835, a large fire in New York City destroyed 17 blocks, and many buildings in the South Street Seaport burned to the ground. Nevertheless, by the 1840s, the port recovered, and by 1850, it reached its heyday:

Looking east, was seen in the distance on the long river front from Coenties Slip to Catharine Street [sic], innumerable masts of the many Californian clippers and London and Liverpool packets, with their long bowsprits extending way over South Street, reaching nearly to the opposite side.

The first Fulton Market burned down in 1878 and was replaced with a red-brick Victorian building four years later.

==== Late 19th to mid-20th centuries ====
At its peak, the port hosted many commercial enterprises, institutions, ship-chandlers, workshops, boarding houses, saloons, and brothels. However, by the 1880s, the port began to be depleted of resources, space for the development of these businesses was diminishing, and the port became too shallow for newer ships. By the 1930s, most of the piers no longer functioned, and cargo ships docked mainly on ports on the West Side and in Hoboken. The second Fulton Market was demolished in 1951 and replaced with a utilitarian building. By the 1960s, the old Ward Line docks, comprising Piers 15, 16, and part of 17, were mostly vacant.

=== Late-20th century redevelopment ===
==== Creation of Seaport Museum ====
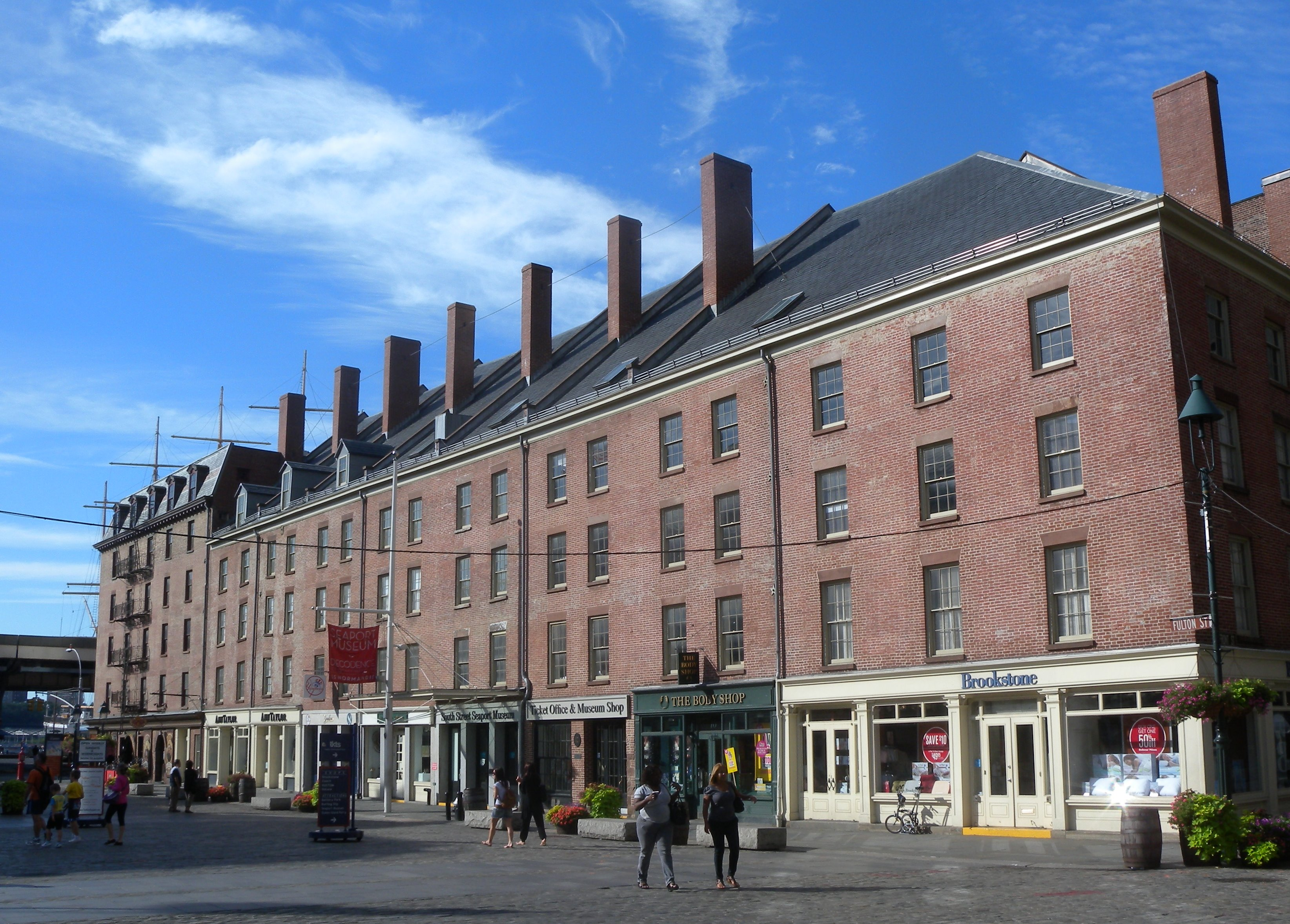
Part of Schermerhorn Row, early 19th-century mercantile buildings

Peter Stanford and his wife Norma cofounded the Friends of South Street in 1966. The next year, Peter began advocating for the creation of a museum around South and Fulton streets. The museum was tentatively planned to include a rigger docked permanently at Pier 16, as well as a series of buildings in a three-block area around South, Fulton, Front, and Beekman streets. At the time, the New York State Legislature had already passed legislation to permit a museum on Schermerhorn Row, near South and Fulton streets. The newly-formed South Street Seaport Museum met in June 1967 to discuss the plans, which city officials viewed as a long-shot proposal due to the large number of approvals and permits required. The Titanic Memorial, formerly mounted atop the Seamen's Church Institute building near Coenties Slip, was gifted to the museum in 1968, though the memorial would not be dedicated for another eight years.

Meanwhile, the museum's supporters bought up property surrounding Schermerhorn Row and the Fulton Fish Market. By 1968, Stanford and his associates had discovered that real-estate developers were buying up some of the property that the museum wanted to acquire, with the intent of demolishing these buildings. The museum also began obtaining vessels with the acquisition of the Lightship Ambrose, the fishing schooner Caviar, and the iron-hulled ship Wavertree. The restoration was planned to cost $20 million by 1969, at which point the museum was to cover 8.5 acres (3.4 ha). by then, the museum owned four ships and had a small exhibit space. Restoration of the first building officially began on May 15, 1969. After the New York City Planning Commission approved the South Street Seaport Museum's plans for the site the same month, the museum's sponsors acquired two blocks of Schermerhorn Row that July. Atlas-McGrath, which had wanted to redevelop Schermerhorn Row, eventually agreed to give the buildings to the museum in exchange for the sites' air rights. However, the museum had to spend millions of dollars in legal fees related to Schermerhorn Row.

By the early 1970s, the Seaport Museum operated an exhibit hall, a bookstore–art gallery, piers 15 and 16, and six ships. The museum regularly hosted cultural events at the seaport, including sea shanty songs and miniature folk festivals. The museum had a half-million annual visitors, and Friends of the South Street Seaport had grown to include 17,000 members. In March 1972, city mayor John V. Lindsay and state governor Nelson Rockefeller announced that the Seaport would be expanded to 33 acres (13 ha) as part of the construction of Manhattan Landing, a $1.2 billion development on the East River shoreline. There were plans for the Seaport to include several additional museums, stores, hotels, and a functional shipyard. The City Planning Commission approved Manhattan Landing that May and voted to create a special planning district for the Seaport the next month. Despite the approvals, the Manhattan Landing project had stalled by 1975.

The city acquired four blocks of the Seaport area in July 1973, while the Seaport Museum continued to operate these sites under a leaseback arrangement. This enabled the city to sell the blocks' air rights to the New York Telephone Company, which was erecting a skyscraper nearby. That October, the museum announced that it would renovate three blocks of the Seaport; this was part of a restoration that was planned in advance of the United States Bicentennial. Stanford left the Seaport Museum in 1976. The museum's leadership, which by then had barely enough money to keep the Seaport buildings in good shape, decided to seek a commercial partner to help them redevelop the South Street Seaport. The city government, which had recently recovered from a fiscal crisis, would not be eligible for loans from many banks, requiring the involvement of a private developer. In December 1977, the Seaport Museum and Baltimore-based real-estate developer The Rouse Company each agreed to spend $250,000 on a feasibility study for a possible redevelopment of the Seaport area.

=== 1980s commercial redevelopment ===
South Street Seaport
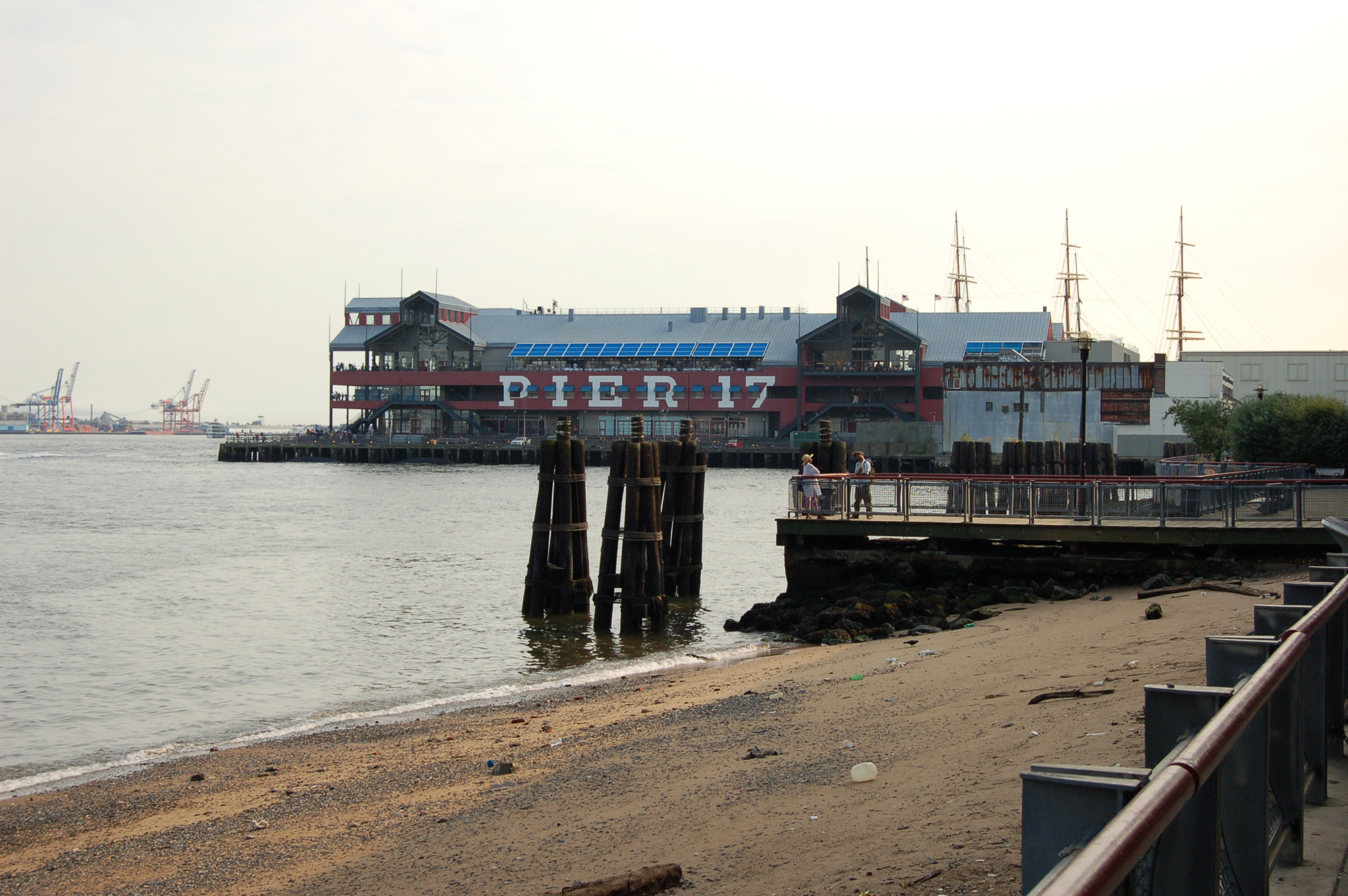
- The Pier 17 Pavilion in July 2006
- Location: Manhattan, New York City, NY, United States
- Address: 11 Fulton Street and 89 South Street, 10038
- Opened: July 28, 1983; 43 years ago (Fulton Market Building); September 11, 1985; 41 years ago (Pier 17 Pavilion)
- Renovated: 2015 (Fulton Market)
- Closed: September 9, 2013; 13 years ago (Pier 17 Pavilion only)
- Demolished: Early 2014 – Late 2014 (Pier 17 Pavilion only)
- Developer: The Rouse Company
- Manager: Seaport Entertainment Group
- Owner: Seaport Entertainment Group
- Architect: Benjamin Thompson & Associates, Inc.
- Num. of stores: 150 (at peak)
- Floors: 3 in all marketplaces
- Parking: Parking lot / Parking garage
- Website: theseaport.nyc

The South Street Seaport Festival Marketplace is a shopping plaza and entertainment district at the South Street Seaport, and it once consisted of three shopping malls: the Pier 17 Pavilion which also included an office building (closed in September 2013 for redevelopment), the renovated Tin Building (relocated and rebuilt since September 2022), and the fourth Fulton Market Building. As of September 2022, the Fulton Market is the only Rouse structure still in operation at the area, as Pier 17 was razed and the Tin Building was dismantled and reconstructed.

==== 1979–1985: Development and opening ====
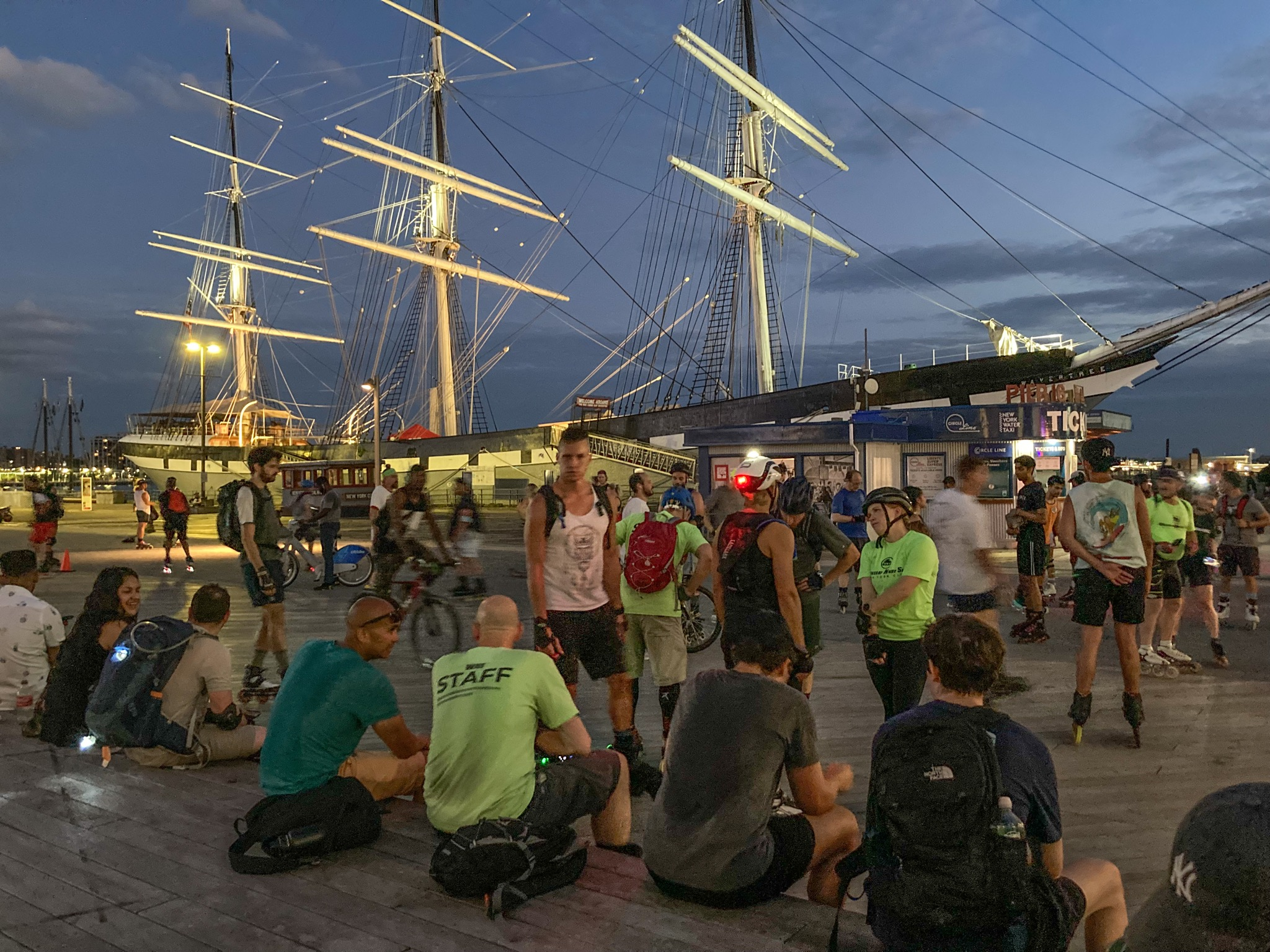
Wednesday Night Skate NYC stopping by Pier 16 in front of Wavertree

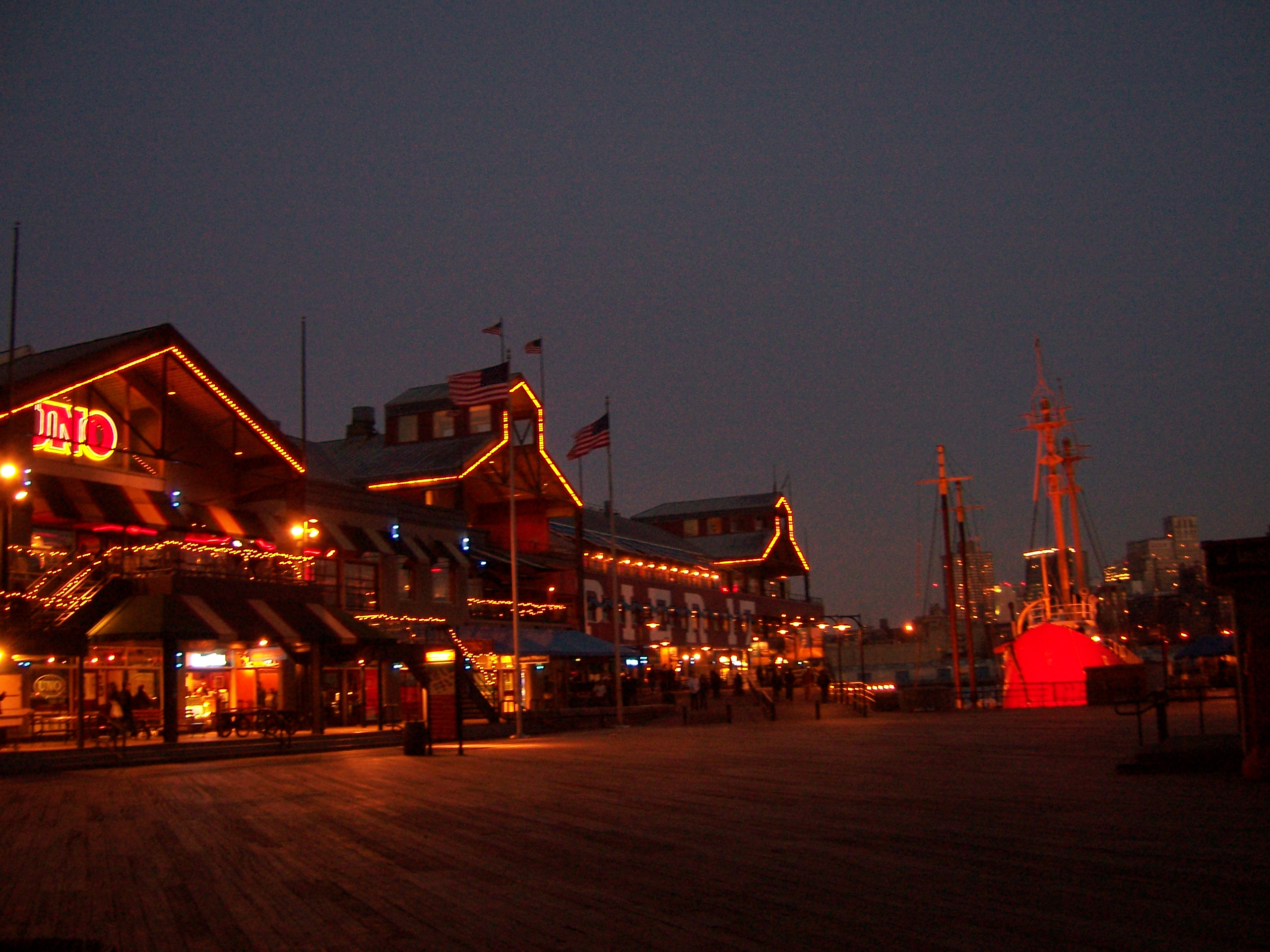
Pier 17 Pavilion at night (March 1, 2007)

In September 1979, The Rouse Company, the New York State Urban Development Corporation, the New York City government, and the South Street Seaport Museum tentatively agreed on a plan to redevelop the South Street Seaport. The project was likened to Harborplace in Baltimore which was under construction at the time, and Faneuil Hall Marketplace in Boston, which Rouse had previously completed in 1976.

Subsequently, in June 1980, the New York City Board of Estimate gave city officials permission to request a $28 million federal grant for the redevelopment. The Board of Estimate approved the commercial-district plan that November, despite concerns over substantial rent increases and a lack of public access. At the time, it was expected to cost about $203 million or $211 million and create 4,600 jobs. Key components of the proposal included a 242,000-square-foot (22,500 m^{2}) commercial, hotel, and office building, as well as a new Fulton Market building covering 60,000 square feet (5,600 m^{2}). That December the United States Department of Housing and Urban Development approved a $20.45 million grant for the project.

Though some local business owners had concerns that they would be forced out due to rent increases, Kenneth Schuman, the New York City Commissioner for Economic Development, said the project "would allow New Yorkers to rediscover the long-obliterated, but historic, link between the city and its waterfront". Developers began converting two buildings in the Seaport district into residential structures in 1981, and the Board of Estimate gave final approval to the project that October. By that year, the Seaport Museum had spent $9 million on ship restoration in the preceding twelve years. Seaport Museum subsidiary South Street Seaport Corporation took a 99-year lease on the site in 1982 and became the Fulton Market's landlord. Also in 1982, the museum acquired 285 mid-20th-century Van Ryper ship models and archival materials from Charles King Van Riper's son, Anthony K. Van Riper.

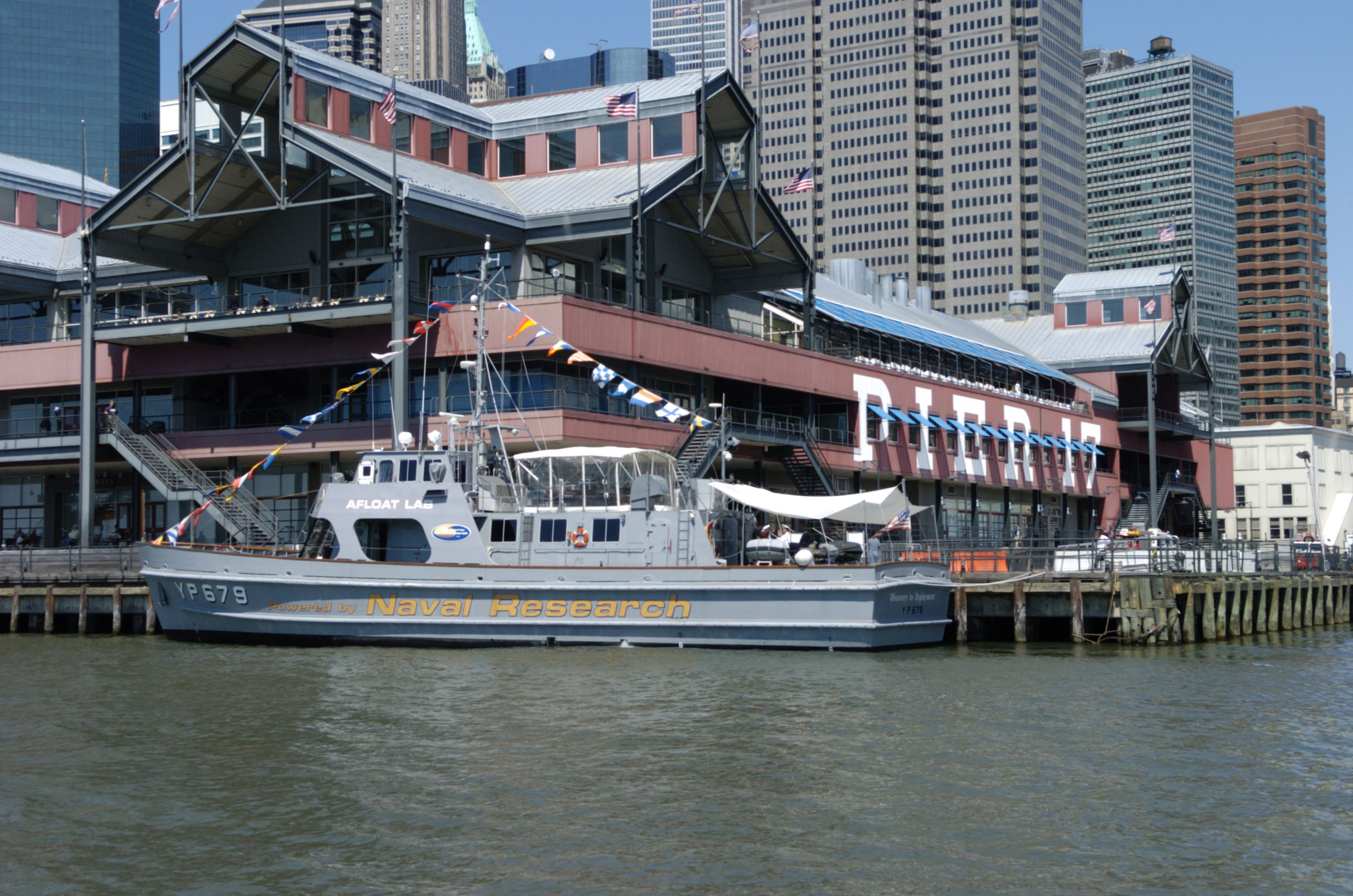
The Pier 17 Pavilion during 18th annual Fleet Week

For the redevelopment into a festival marketplace, The Rouse Company formed the subsidiary Seaport Marketplace, Inc. The first phase of the South Street Seaport redevelopment was completed on July 28, 1983, covering four blocks of the South Street Seaport U.S. historic district. This project included construction of the fourth Fulton Market Building, a three-story building designed by Benjamin C. Thompson, with about 95,000 square feet (8,800 m^{2}) of space. The project also included a renovation of 14 buildings in the South Street Seaport Museum and 12 buildings in Schermerhorn Row. Within a few months of its completion, the first phase of the redevelopment was credited with helping attract commercial activity to the area. The second phase was to include another structure on Pier 17 with 120,000 square feet (11,000 m^{2}). The Pier 17 Pavilion opened on September 11, 1985; the original Pier 17 Pavilion included an office building and a three-story, Victorian-style red shopping mall, a structure that combined Piers 17 and 18, housing approximately 120–150 shops and restaurants. The Pier 17 Pavilion was also designed by Benjamin Thompson and developed by The Rouse Company, and its design is comparable to Harborplace, Jacksonville Landing in Jacksonville, and Bayside Marketplace in Miami. The Pier 17 Pavilion was also referred to as Pier 17 Mall or The Mall at South Street Seaport.

==== Late 1980s – 1990s: Decline ====
After the Pier 17 Pavilion was completed, it initially suffered from low patronage, but the marketplace was approaching full occupancy by early 1986. The city government also allocated $500,000 for repairs to Pier 15 to make it suitable for commercial ferry service. By the late 1980s, a Gallup poll had found that the South Street Seaport was the tourist attraction that New York City residents favored the most. Nonetheless, visitation continued to be lower than expected, and the Rouse Company announced plans in February 1988 to rebuild some of the retail space. By March 1989, only seven of the original 22 food vendors were still operating on Pier 17's second-floor food court. In 1989, the New York City government made an agreement with developers Metropolis Group and N. M. Palermo Inc. to redevelop a block on Front Street. The 170,000-square-foot (16,000 m^{2}) project was to include ground-level shops, offices, and apartments. A 4-to-6-story hotel on Front Street was approved later that year. Milstein Properties, which also wanted to develop a high-rise building at 250 Water Street near the Seaport, repeatedly submitted plans for that site in the late 20th century without success.

The Seaport Museum ceded the Fulton Market to the city government in 1993, citing difficulties in collecting rent, and most of the Fulton Market's tenants were forced to leave after their leases expired. The Tin Building was severely damaged in a 1995 fire. The Fulton Market building was almost entirely vacant by the late 1990s. At that point, most of the small businesses in the Pier 17 Pavilion had been replaced with chain stores by the Rouse Co. for financial reasons, and there were only a few maritime stores even though the Seaport was required to promote tenants who sold "maritime and sea-related activities and products".

=== 21st century ===
==== Decline (continued) – 2000s ====
Following several attempts to redevelop 250 Water Street, Manhattan Community Board 1 voted in favor of rezoning the South Street Seaport in 2002, restricting the area to lower-density development. In addition, the South Street Seaport Museum built its first permanent-exhibition space, which was part of a $21 million renovation of Schermerhorn Row. In November 2004, General Growth Properties (GGP) of Chicago, Illinois acquired The Rouse Company, as well as all of its assets, including the South Street Seaport. The Fulton Fish Market moved from the Seaport to The Bronx in 2005, at which point the neighborhood was being redeveloped as a residential area.

=== Redevelopment proposals ===
By 2007, GGP wanted to redevelop South Street Seaport as an upscale shopping area to cater to the growing local population. GGP proposed a mixed-use tower and a community center on the Fulton Market site, but it withdrew these plans in early 2008 following community objections. In June 2008, GGP proposed replacing the Pier 17 Pavilion with a 42-story tower, several two-story store buildings, and a 4-to-6-story hotel designed by SHoP Architects. To make room for the tower, the Tin Building would have been relocated. This plan also faced opposition from local residents and elected officials, and the New York City Landmarks Preservation Commission, which had to approve changes to the Tin Building and other landmarked structures on the site, rejected the plans in November. GGP placed the South Street Seaport for sale in late 2008, although it is unclear whether the company actually intended to sell the complex. GGP filed for bankruptcy in 2009, and the next year, it agreed to transfer South Street Seaport and other properties to a subsidiary. The Seaport was thus taken over by the Howard Hughes Corporation, which paid $305 million to lease the site. After Howard Hughes took over the Seaport, GGP's original development plans were canceled.

=== 2010s redevelopment ===
==== Initial plans ====
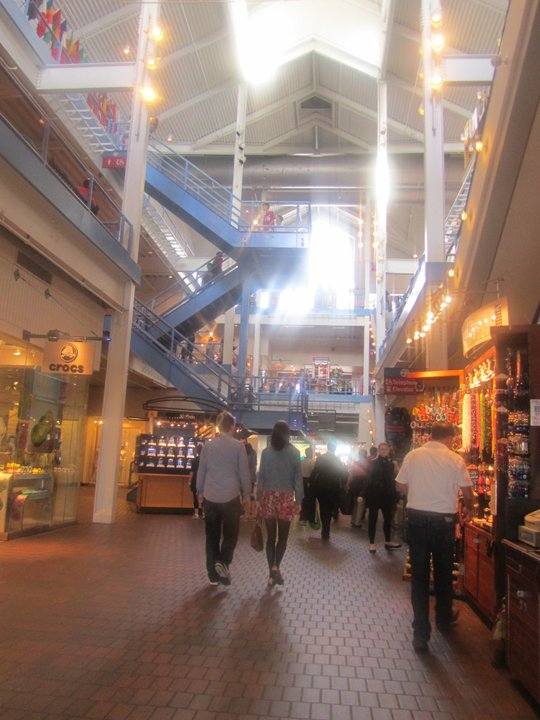
Interior view of Pier 17 (August 2012)

The South Street Seaport Museum closed in March 2011, having owed $3 million and being 10 years behind on rent payments. After the Lower Manhattan Development Corporation gave the museum $2 million, it reopened in January 2012 following a three-month renovation.

On July 14, 2012, a three-alarm fire broke out due to an electrical failure underneath the pier from faulty wiring, sending plumes of smoke over Lower Manhattan and up to the Pier 17 Pavilion, highlighting the mall's vulnerability on a highly flammable pier made out of wood. The mall was also crowded with shoppers when the fire began, and staff members did not pull fire alarms, instead yelling "Fire!" to shoppers, causing immediate panic. The pier itself has also been neglected; it was reported to be sinking into the East River, making continued use of the Pier 17 Pavilion and the pier itself unsafe. Rebuilding the pier alone would cost over $120 million.

The Museum of the City of New York (MCNY) also agreed to operate the Seaport Museum. The Howard Hughes Corporation announced plans that August 2012 to redevelop Pier 17, and it also exercised an option to redevelop the Tin Building and Fulton Market Building. Howard Hughes' Pier 17 redevelopment was part of a broader $785 million plan for the Seaport, which was to include seven commercial and entertainment buildings.

During Hurricane Sandy in late October 2012, many of the businesses closed, and the remaining businesses suffered from a severe drop in business after the storm. The Seaport Museum reopened in December 2012, but the museum's galleries on Fulton Street were forced to close in 2013. The Pier 17 Pavilion was heavily damaged with electrical failures and structural problems, though the pier itself was found to be in decent condition. The plans to merge MCNY and the Seaport Museum were also canceled. In November 2012, the Pier 17 Pavilion was cited as a "dead mall", as while some businesses did reopen after Hurricane Sandy, the majority of them never reopened due to major damage. The New York Times described the mall as a "dated festival marketplace" in late December 2012. The Pier 17 Pavilion was also described as a tourist trap.

The city government approved the redevelopment of Pier 17 in February 2013. The Pier 17 Pavilion was fully vacated, permanently closed its doors at 9:00 p.m. EDT on September 9, 2013, and was demolished starting in early 2014 and being completed by late 2014 following issues regarding final tenant Simply Seafood not wanting to leave. Long-time tenants like Uno Pizzeria & Grill were also forced out to allow for construction. The New York Times described the permanent closure of Pier 17, the "mall at South Street Seaport", as sad. Redevelopment of Pier 17 broke ground in October 2013. That November, SHoP Architects announced plans for a 50-story tower on Pier 17. The proposed tower was downsized following community opposition, and continued opposition to the tower caused the Seaport's redevelopment to be stalled. The Federal Emergency Management Agency gave the Seaport $10.4 million in 2015 to repair damage caused by Hurricane Sandy. That December, the Seaport tower was canceled due to continued community opposition. As a result of the development plans, the National Trust for Historic Preservation placed the Seaport on its 2015 list of America's Most Endangered Places.

New York Pier 17
- Interactive map of New York Pier 17
- Address: 11 Fulton Street and 89 South Street, 10038
- Location: Manhattan, New York City, United States
- Owner: Seaport Entertainment Group and Live Nation Entertainment
- Operator: Seaport Entertainment Group and Live Nation Entertainment
- Type: Shopping mall and entertainment venue
- Current use: Shopping mall and entertainment venue
- Parking: Parking lot / Parking garage

Construction
- Built: 2018
- Reopened: July 2018; 8 years ago
- Architect: SHoP Architects

Website
- rooftopatpier17.com
- Building details
- Alternative names: The Rooftop at Pier 17

General information
- Construction started: September 2013 with the demolition of the original Pier 17

Technical details
- Floor count: 4

Design and construction
- Developer: The Howard Hughes Corporation and Live Nation Entertainment

The iPic theater opened within the Fulton Building in 2016, becoming the first long-term tenant to move in after the Seaport's redevelopment. A new four-story structure on Pier 17, designed by SHoP Architects, opened in July 2018; the Pier 17 project had cost $425 million. At the time, Howard Hughes wanted to redevelop the Seaport into a tourist destination, with attractions such as a food market, movie theater and rooftop concert venue and event space. Howard Hughes partnered with Live Nation Entertainment for the development of the new mall, including the rooftop concert venue.

In 2018, the city government approved the demolition of a vacant Fulton Market building, which had been built in 1939 and was extremely decrepit. In addition, the Tin Building was dismantled and relocated slightly, and a 53,000-square-foot (4,900 m^{2}) food hall was built there. During that decade, Howard Hughes also proposed redeveloping the long-vacant site at 250 Water Street.

=== 2020s–present ===
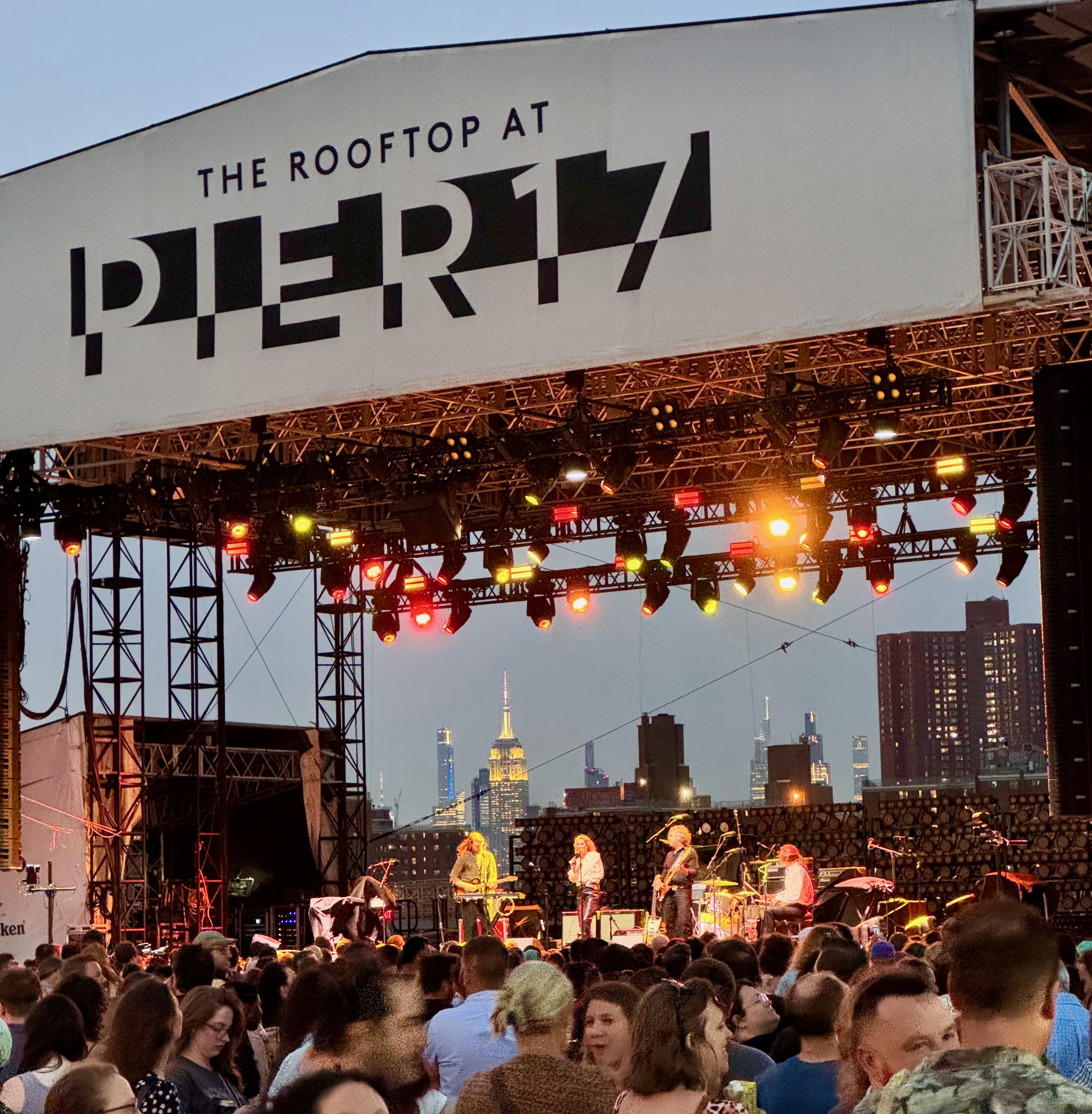
The band Rilo Kiley performs at the Rooftop at Pier 17 in September 2025, with the Empire State Building visible in the background.

The Tin Building's food hall, operated by Jean-Georges Vongerichten, opened in late September 2022 at a total cost of $200 million. The new building was raised in response to damage to the original structure by Hurricane Sandy. Howard Hughes hired Jones Lang LaSalle (JLL) in 2023 to lease out the storefronts that it owned along South Street. Howard Hughes proposed transferring the South Street Seaport's operations to a new subsidiary, Seaport Entertainment Group, the same year; the split was approved in July 2024. Marvel Architects and Beyer Blinder Belle redesigned the A. A. Thomson & Co. Warehouse at 213–215 Water Street, renovating it for the South Street Seaport Museum in 2025. By the same year, many of the shops in the Tin Building's food hall had closed; in addition, the 250 Water Street development had been placed on hold. The surrounding area had also become more residential. There was a proposal in mid-2025 to add a glass canopy to Pier 17, converting it into a year-round entertainment venue, but plans for the canopy were later canceled. The Tin Building's food hall closed in February 2026 to make way for a balloon museum.

== Ownership and management ==
=== Commercial spaces ===
Pier 17, the Fulton Market Building, the Tin Building, and many of the other commercial spaces at the seaport are owned and managed by the Seaport Entertainment Group, a spinoff from the Howard Hughes Corporation as of 2024. Formerly, they were owned by General Growth Properties, which acquired Pier 17's longtime owner, The Rouse Company, in 2004. The Seaport was included in the 2010 spinoff of the Howard Hughes Corporation from GGP, and then in the 2024 spinoff of Seaport Entertainment from Howard Hughes.

=== Museum ===
The South Street Seaport Museum was formed as a nonprofit organization to redevelop the area, first convening in 1967. Designated by Congress in 1998 as one of several museums which together make up "America's National Maritime Museum", South Street Seaport Museum sits in a 12 square-block historic district that is the site of the original port of New York City. As of 2025, the museum spans across the Schermerhorn Row buildings, several other structures on Fulton Street, the A. A. Thompson Warehouse, and Pier 16. The Museum has over 30,000 square feet (2,800 m^{2}) of exhibition space and educational facilities. It houses exhibition galleries, a working 19th-century print shop, an archeology museum, a maritime library, a craft center, a marine life conservation lab, and the largest privately owned fleet of historic ships in the country.

==== Ships in the port ====
The museum has five vessels docked permanently or semi-permanently, four of which have formal historical status.

Name	Year of launch	Type	Description	Picture	Notes
United States Lightship LV-87	1908	Lightship	LV-87 is a lightship 135 feet (41 m) long and 29 feet (8.8 m) wide, built in Camden, New Jersey, in 1907. It was stationed at the entrance to Ambrose Channel and became the third lightship there since 1854. In 1932 the ship was replaced by the new LV-111 ship and moved to the Scotland Station. LV-87 was retired in 1966 and sent to the South Street Seaport in 1968. In 1989 it gained National Historic Landmark status.		
Lettie G. Howard	1893	Schooner	The fishing schooner was launched in Essex, Massachusetts. The vessel is 125 feet (38 m) long overall and 21 feet (6.4 m) wide. The schooner was used for fishing mostly off the coast of Yucatan. In 1989 it was given National Historic Landmark status.		
Pioneer	1885	Schooner	The schooner was launched in Marcus Hook, Pennsylvania. Initially, it was rigged as a sloop, but in 1895 it was rerigged as a schooner. The vessel is 102 feet (31 m) long. Its hull was originally wrought iron but was rebuilt in steel in the 1960s. It was used for transportation of various goods: sand, wood, stone, bricks and oyster shells. Now it is used for educational tours of New York Harbor.		
W. O. Decker	1930	Tugboat	The 52 foot (16 m) steam tug was built in Long Island City, Queens and first named Russell I. Subsequently, the engine was replaced by a 175 horsepower (130 kW) diesel engine. In 1986 the boat was transferred to the South Street Seaport museum. In 1996 it was entered in the National Register of Historic Places.		
Wavertree	1885	Freighter	The ship was launched in Southampton. It is 325 feet (99 m) long including spars and 263 feet (80 m) on deck. The ship is the largest remaining wrought iron vessel. Initially it was used for transporting jute from east India to Scotland, and then was involved in the tramp trade. In 1947 it was converted into a sand barge, and in 1968 it was acquired by the South Street Seaport Museum. In 1978 the ship was entered in the National Register of Historic Places.		

Legend:

- – Designated National Historic Landmark and on the National Register of Historic Places
- – On the National Register of Historic Places

The Pioneer and W. O. Decker operate during favorable weather.

The museum's collection also contained the four-masted barque Peking from 1974 until 2016, when the ship was given to the German Port Museum in Hamburg, Germany. The sidewheeler Alexander Hamilton was shipped to the Seaport in 1972 for use as a restaurant barge, was never used for that purpose and later acquired by a New Jersey organization.

== Streets ==
Since 1972, all vehicles except for emergency vehicles have been banned from six blocks within the Seaport.

=== Peck Slip ===
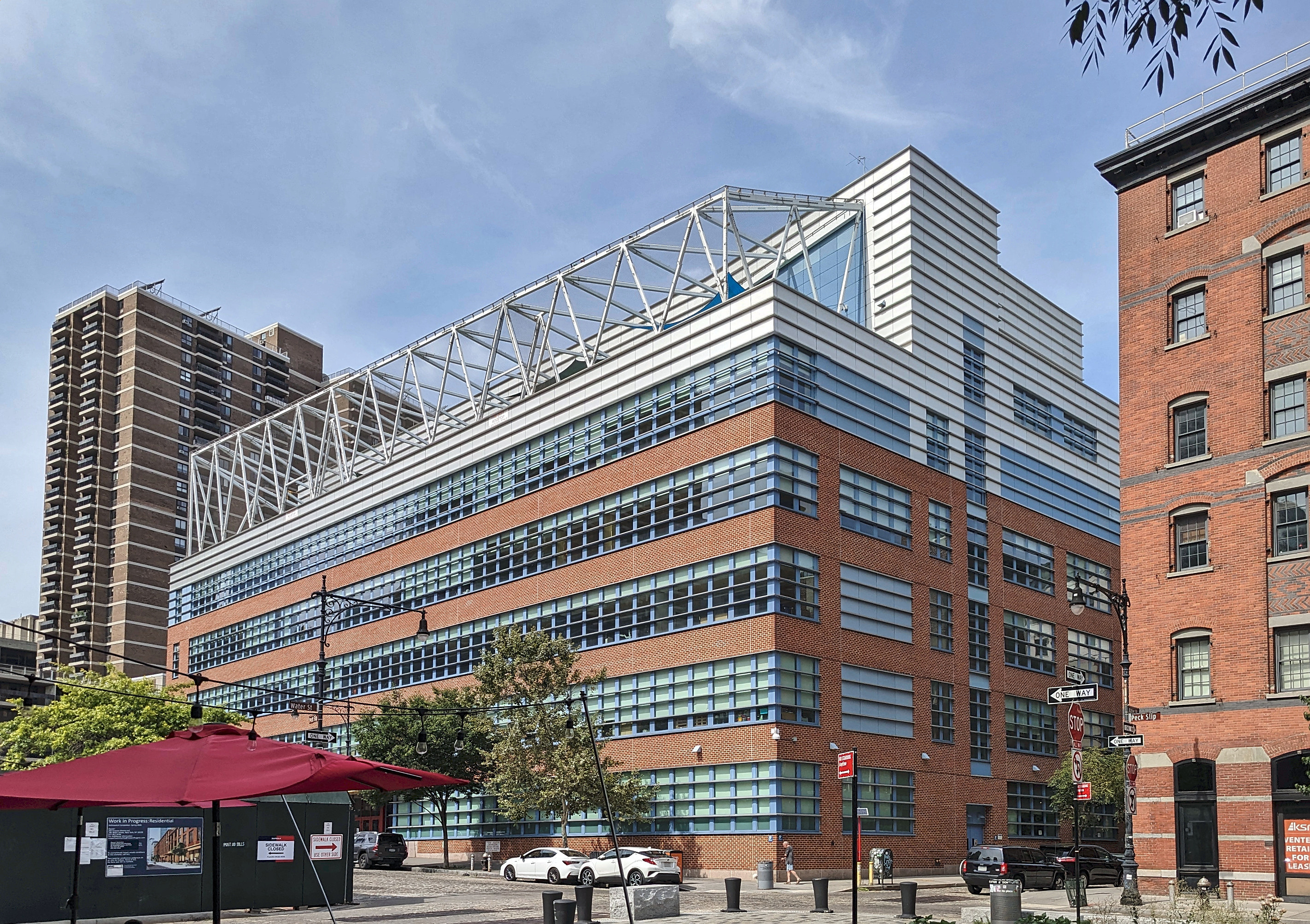
PS 343, the Peck Slip School

Peck Slip, which occupies the area between present-day Water and South streets, served as an active docking place for boats until 1810, and even served as a temporary hideout for George Washington and his troops in April 1776 when they fled from the Battle of Long Island. Then, in 1838, the first steam-powered vessel to make a transatlantic voyage, the S.S. Great Western, docked in Peck's Slip to the cheers of a quickly growing crowd of onlookers. Today, the median of the street serves as an open space for the community with Brooklyn Bridge views, often displaying public art installations and gatherings, such as fairs and concerts. Peck Slip is also home to the neighborhood's K-5 elementary school The Peck Slip School, P.S. 343, as well as a post office.

== Other structures ==
=== Pier 17 ===
Pier 17 was reconstructed in the 2010s and reopened in July 2018. The modern-day Pier 17 was designed by SHoP Architects. It is variously described as having 212,000 square feet (19,700 m^{2}) or 300,000 square feet (28,000 m^{2}), spread across four stories. Sports broadcaster ESPN opened a radio and television studio at Pier 17 in April 2018, covering 21,000 square feet (2,000 m^{2}). Pier 17 also includes different restaurants on its lower stories; these eateries are scattered across 60,000-square-foot (5,600 m^{2}) floor slabs with movable large glass partitions that can be closed during inclement weather. On the roof is The Rooftop at Pier 17, a 3,500-capacity open-air concert venue that hosts summer concerts between May and October. The rooftop space, covering 60,000 square feet (1.4 acres; 5,600 m^{2}), is open throughout the year and is decorated with a large artwork designed by Achim Menges.

=== Other points of interest ===
Decks outside on Pier 15 allow views of the East River, Brooklyn Bridge, and Brooklyn Heights. The Paris Cafe, within the South Street Seaport historic area, is claimed to be one of the oldest bars in New York City.

The Fulton Building includes the iPic theater, which includes eight auditoriums. Each of the auditoriums has between 43 and 143 seats, including a group of two-person pod seats in each auditorium.

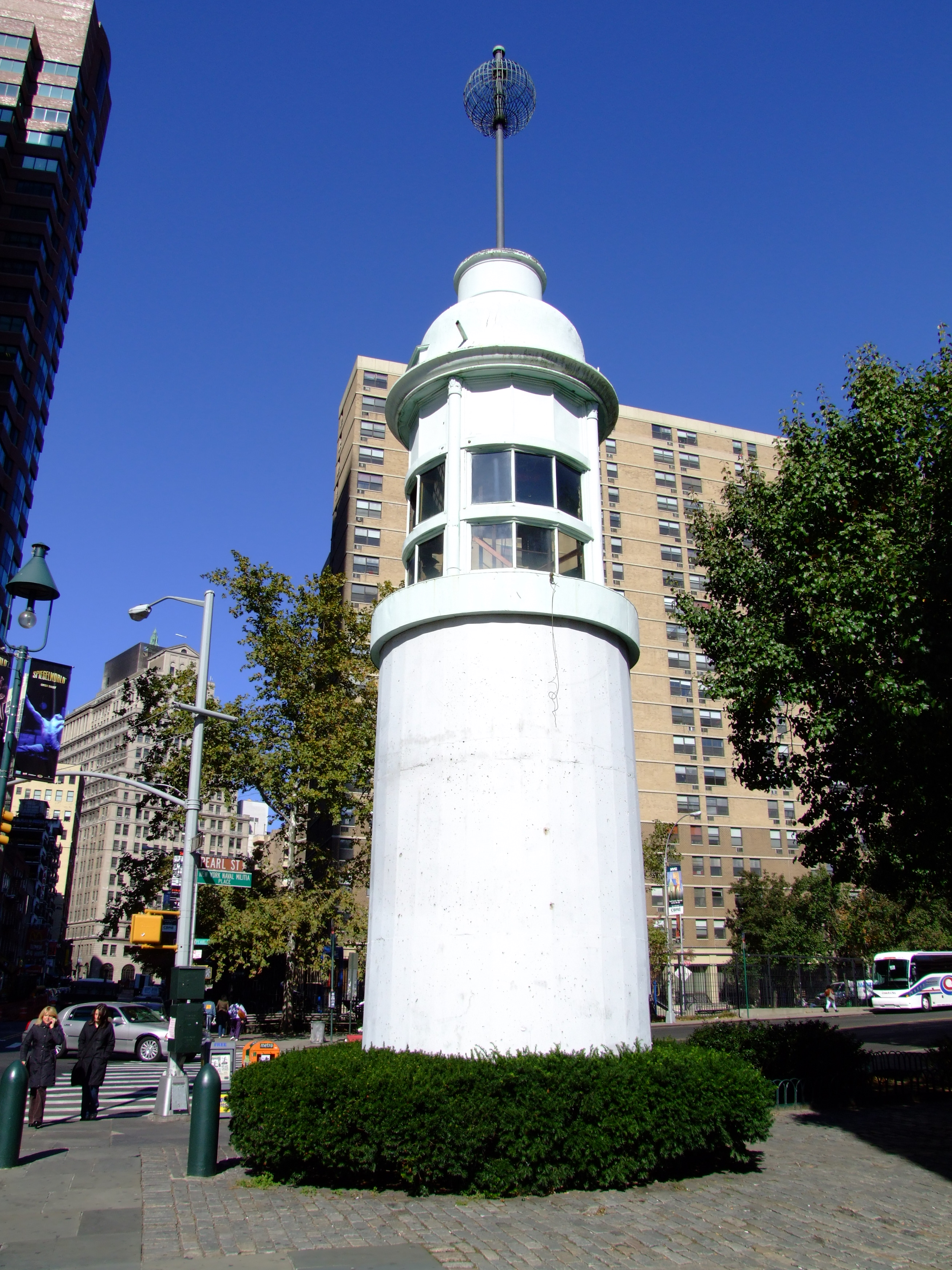
The Titanic memorial

At the entrance to the Seaport is the Titanic Memorial lighthouse.

== Transportation ==
South Street Seaport is served by the M15 and M15 SBS New York City Bus routes.

A regular ferry service, the Fulton Ferry, ran between Pier 16 and the Fulton Ferry pier in Brooklyn until 1924. In 1973, the South Street Seaport Museum proposed operating a ferry service from the seaport to Brooklyn. New York Water Taxi directly serves South Street Seaport on Fridays, weekends, and holidays during the summer, while other New York Water Taxi, NYC Ferry, and SeaStreak ferries serve the nearby ferry slip at Pier 11/Wall Street daily.

The Fulton Street/Fulton Center station complex (2, 3, 4, 5, A, C, E, J, N, R, W, and Z trains) is the closest New York City Subway station. A new subway station, provisionally called Seaport, has been proposed as part of the unfunded Phase 4 of the Second Avenue Subway. Although this station will be located only 3 blocks from the Fulton Street station, there are no plans for a free transfer between them.

== Reception and landmark designations ==
After Pier 17 reopened in 2018, a writer for The Telegraph wrote that the South Street Seaport retained its original charm despite the redevelopment. Justin Davidson of Curbed wrote in 2025 that the Seaport was not only vulnerable to economic changes but also "suffers from a chronic sense of not being real", in spite of the various redevelopment proposals throughout the years.

An 11-block swath of the South Street Seaport is designated as a city historic district. The original district, bounded by John, Front, Pearl, Dover, and South streets and piers 15 through 17, was designated by the New York City Landmarks Preservation Commission in 1977; however, the landmark designation did not prohibit high-rise buildings from being constructed in the area. Block 106 (between Peck Slip and Water, Dover, and Pearl streets) was initially excluded from the district, as it was set aside for redevelopment; the historic-district designation was expanded to this block in 1989. Schermerhorn Row, which is part of the South Street Seaport Historic District, was separately designated as a city landmark in late 1968. A larger area is listed on the National Register of Historic Places as well; a small historic district was designated as the South Street Seaport site (#72000883) in 1972, and it was surrounded by a larger historic district called South Street Seaport Historic District (#78001884) in 1978.

== Gallery ==
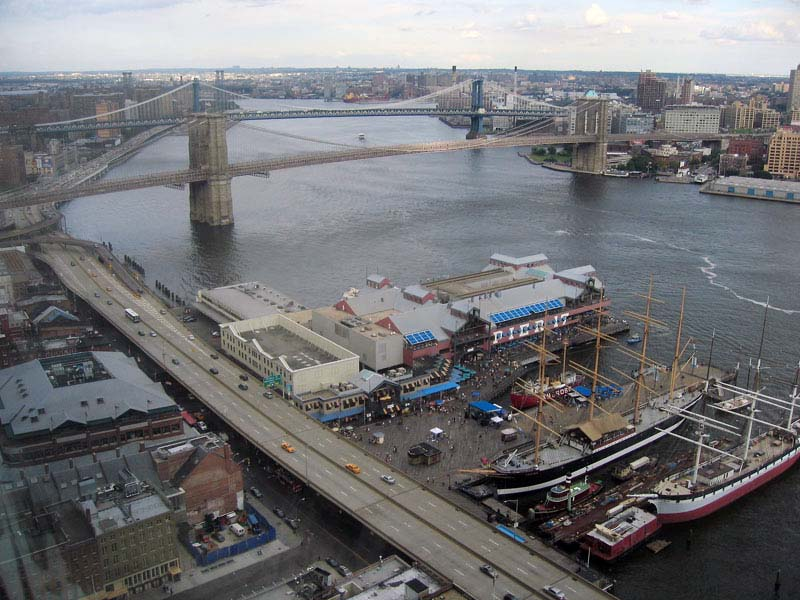
Aerial view

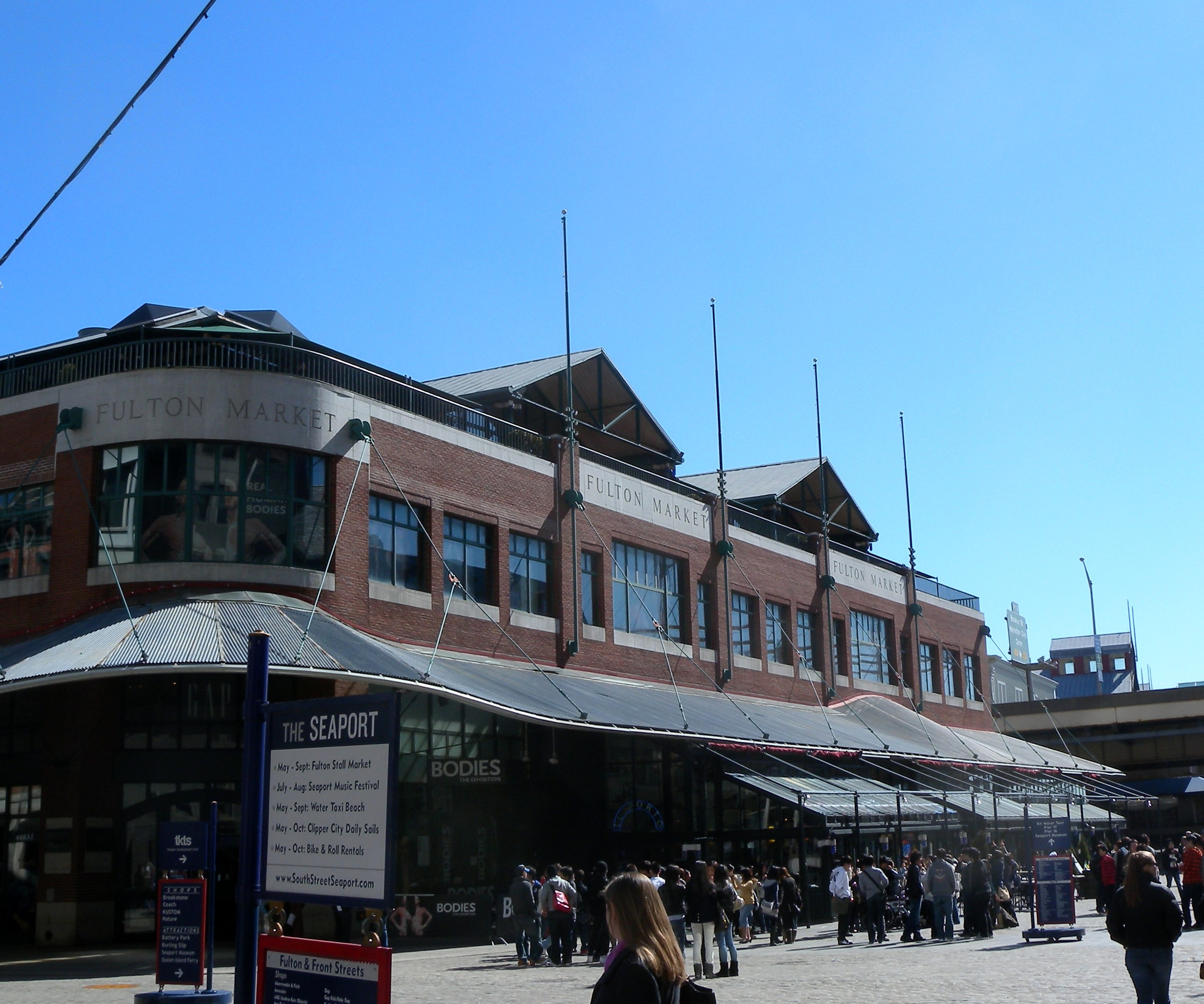
Fulton Market Building

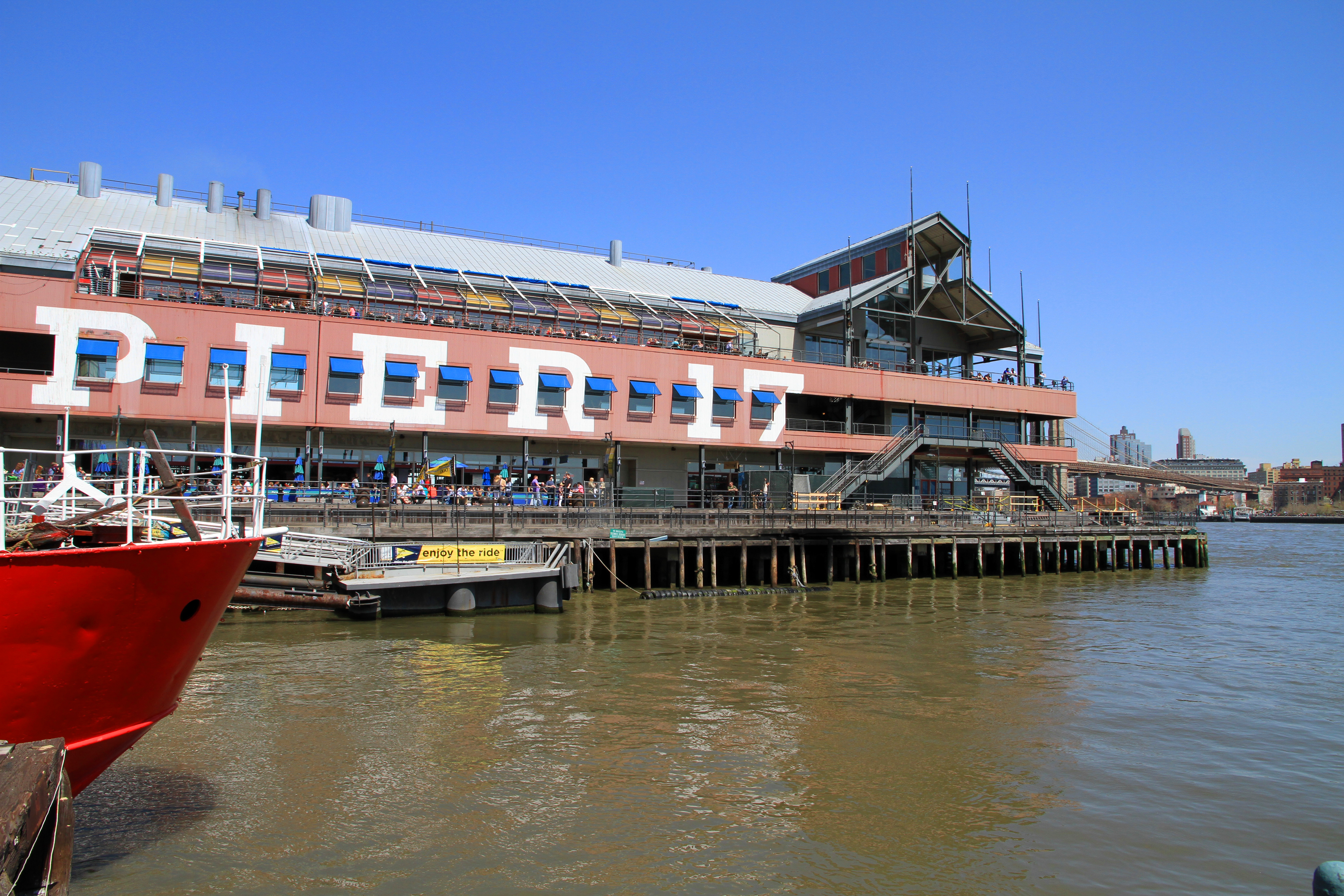
Pier 17 Pavilion

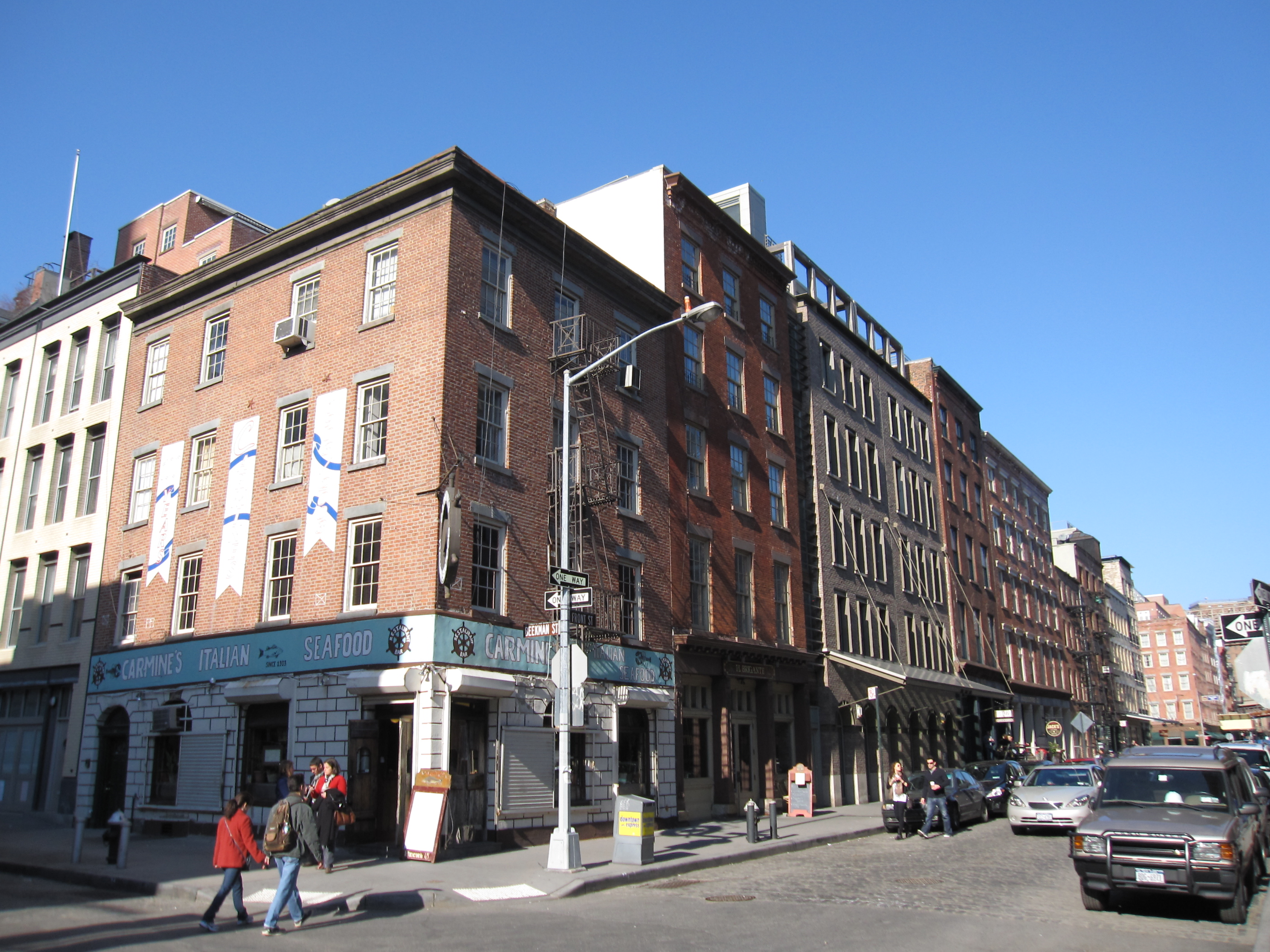
Corner of Front and Beekman Streets

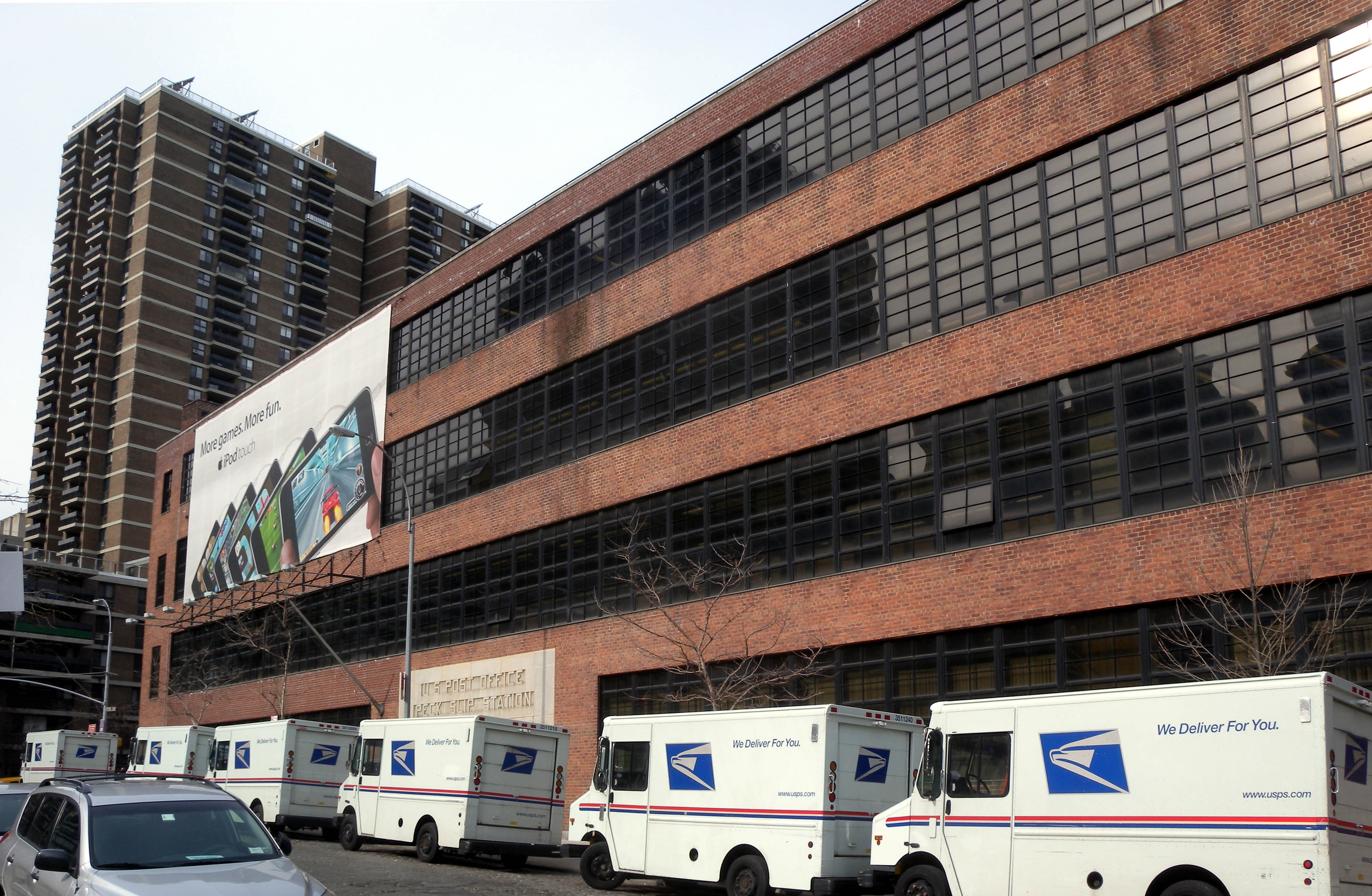
Peck Slip US Post Office, now reused as school

== See also ==
- East River Esplanade
- List of maritime museums in the United States
- List of museum ships

== Bibliography ==
- Jackson, Kenneth T., ed. (1995). The Encyclopedia of New York City. New Haven: Yale University Press. ISBN 0300055366.
- Kroessler, Jeffrey A. (2002). New York Year by Year: A Chronology of the Great Metropolis. NYU Press. ISBN 0-8147-4751-5.
- McKay, Richard Cornelius (1969). South Street: A Maritime History of New York. Ardent Media.
