= Lucy Nettlefold =

British company director and local government politician (1891 – 1966)

"Nancy" Nettlefold
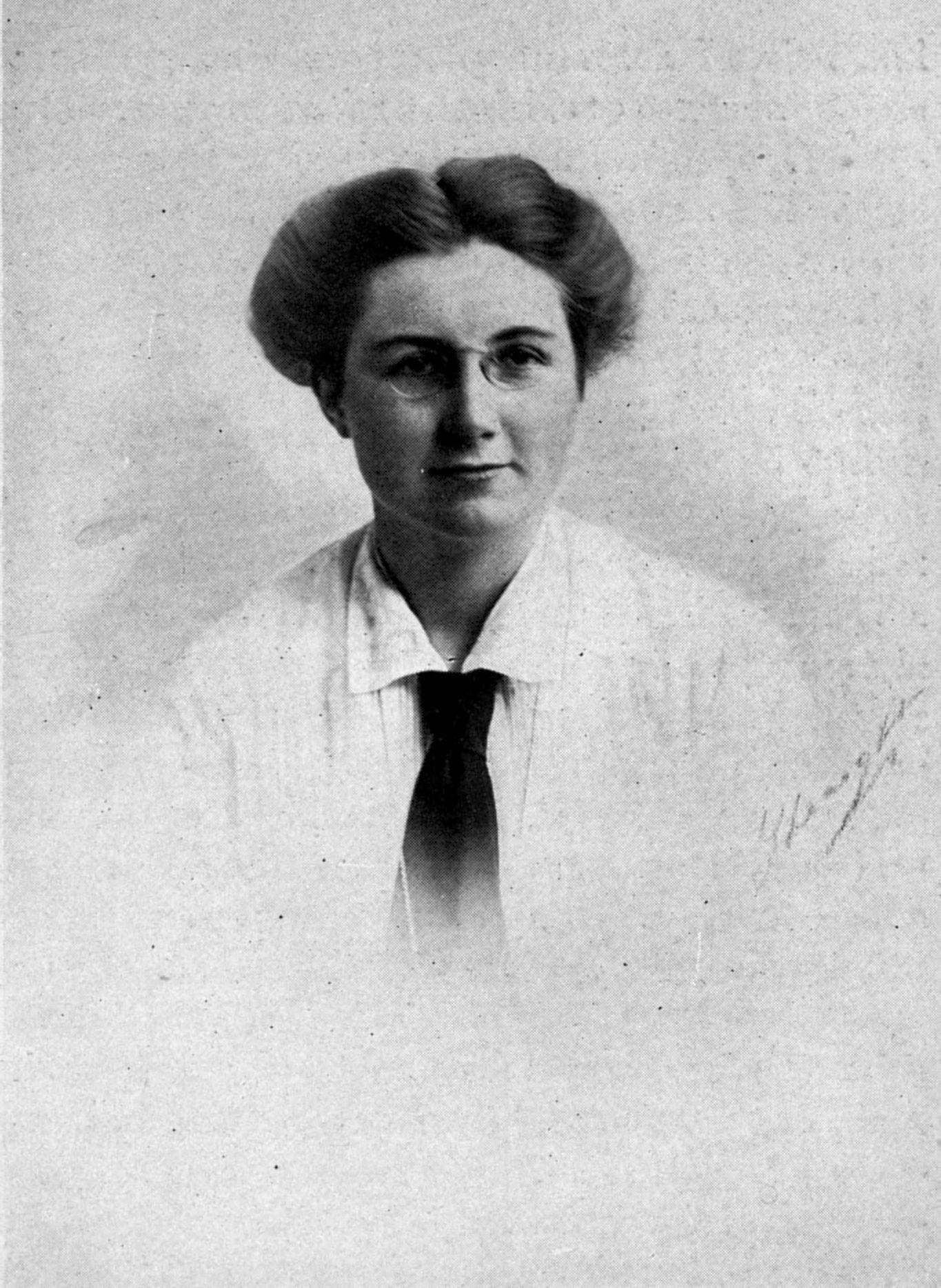
- by Mabel Potter Daggett
- Born: Lucy Frances Nettlefold; 15 June 1891; London
- Died: 30 March 1966 (aged 74); Cape Town
- Education: Newnham College
- Known for: Bebb v. The Law Society and County Councillor
- Political party: Conservative

Lucy Frances Nettlefold OBE aka Nancy Nettlefold (15 June 1891 – 30 March 1966) was a British company director and local government politician. She and three others took the Law Society to court for defining "person" as "man".

== Life ==
Nettlefold was born in London in 1891. Her parents were Emily Josephine (born Buckingham) and Oswald Nettlefold. Her father was a wholesaler of hardware. She was never awarded a law degree because she was a woman. She attended Newnham College and she was the first woman to be awarded for coming first in both parts of Cambridge University's double law tripos. Cambridge allowed women to take the exams but never awarded them degrees for many decades. She was articled unofficially to a Lincoln's Inn law firm before joining the National Service for Women.

== Bebb v. The Law Society ==
In 1913, Nettlefold and three other women started an unsuccessful legal action requesting that the Law Society should be compelled to admit women to its preliminary examinations. The three other women were Maud Crofts, Karin Costelloe, who became a psychoanalyst, and Gwyneth Bebb.

Her friend Bebb became the named party for, Bebb v. The Law Society represented by Stanley Buckmaster KC and R. A. Wright. The test case was heard in the Chancery Division in July 1913 by a hostile judge Mr Justice Joyce. The Solicitors Act 1843 included the sentence, 'every Word importing the Masculine Gender only shall extend and be applied to a Female as well as a Male'. The judge ruled that women had no precedent and therefore he could not authorise the first.

The decision was upheld in the Court of Appeal in December 1913, heard by the Master of the Rolls Lord Cozens-Hardy, Lord Justice Swinfen Eady and Lord Justice Phillimore (included in the law reports in 1914).

The press was mostly in favour, and the case helped the campaign for women's admission to the legal profession in Britain. The passage of the Sex Disqualification (Removal) Act 1919 allowed women to be lawyers. Bebb was expected to be the first British woman lawyer but she died giving birth to her second child. Nettlefold abandoned a career in law after World War I and became a director of Nettlefold & Sons; in 1924, she and her brother became joint managing directors and served until 1945. Of the four who had contested the legal case only Maud Crofts succeeded in becoming a lawyer. Nettlefold left law, Costelloe became a psychoanalyst, Bedd died, but Crofts became the first woman lawyer and a partner in the law firm of Crofts, Ingram and Wyatt & Co.

== Public life ==
In 1939, when war broke out, two women were appointed to lead the reformed Women's Royal Naval Service (WRNS). There was no staff and initially only volunteer helpers but 1,500 new members were to be recruited. The interview panel was the WRNS director Vera Laughton Mathews, her deputy Ethel Goodenough, Myra Curtis, and Nettlefold who was chosen because she had been at university with Mathews.

In 1944, Nettlefold joined the Royal Commission on equal pay. She and two others had to present a minority report as the commission would not support their position of equal pay for women as a recommendation.

She joined London County Council in 1949 for the Conservative Party and she became an OBE in 1946. She was on the LCC until 1960. In 1953 she joined Marylebone borough council. Her sister Joyce Newton-Thompson became first woman mayor of Cape Town.

Nettlefold retired in 1960 and died in Cape Town in 1966.
