= Bebb =

Bebb is a surname. Notable people with the surname include:

- Charles Bebb (1856–1942), leading Seattle architect
- Dewi Bebb (1936–1996), Welsh rugby union player who won thirty four caps for Wales as a winger
- Guto Bebb (born 1969), former Welsh MP For Aberconwy
- Gwyneth Bebb (1889–1921), Plaintiff in British 1913 testcase to open legal profession to women
- Llewellyn John Montfort Bebb (1862–1915), British academic
- Michael Schuck Bebb (1833–1895), amateur systematic botanist and salicologist in America and Europe
- Maurice R. Bebb (1891–1986), etcher and printmaker of the American Midwest
- Peter Bebb, special effects artist
- Richard Bebb (1927–2006), English actor of stage, screen and radio
- William Ambrose Bebb (1894–1955), Welsh language writer, critic and scholar
- William Bebb (1802–1873), Whig politician from Ohio

== See also ==
- Bebb and Gould, architectural partnership active in Seattle from 1914 to 1939
- Bebb Travel, later Crossgates Coaches former Welsh bus and coach operator
