= Maud Crofts =

British solicitor (1889–1965)

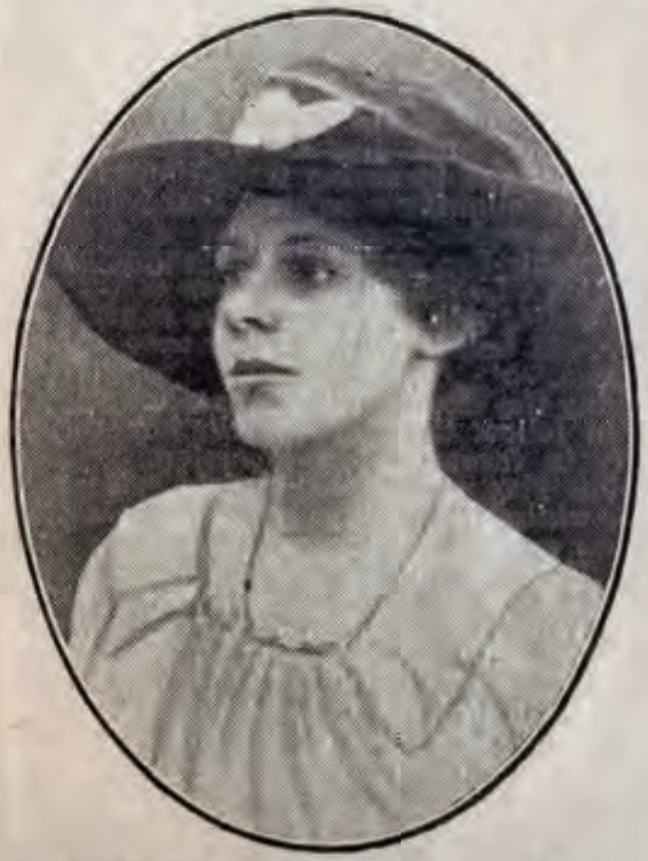
- Born: Maud Isabel Ingram; 16 June 1889; Brighton, Sussex, England
- Died: 18 January 1965 (aged 75); London, England
- Education: Girton College
- Occupation: Solicitor
- Employer(s): Trower, Still and Keeling
- Known for: first woman lawyer in the UK
- Spouse: John Cecil Crofts
- Children: two

Maud Isabel Ingram became Maud Isabel Crofts (16 June 1889 – 18 January 1965) was the first British woman to be articled and the first to be a solicitor after a ten-year campaign from 1913 to 1923. Ivy Williams was the first to be called to the bar in 1922.

== Life ==
Crofts was born in 1889 in Brighton. Her mother, Violet (born Skinner) was descended from a long line of relatives who had been involved with India as a British colony and her family had estates in India. Her father, Thomas Lewis Ingram, was a barrister and she attended Girton College where she gained a Tennis Blue. She graduated in History and Law, but she could not become a lawyer at that time.

In 1913 Crofts and three other women started a legal action requesting that the Law Society be compelled to admit women to its examinations. The three other women were Lucy Nettlefold, Karin Costelloe and Gwyneth Bebb.

Bebb became the named party for, Bebb v. The Law Society. The case was taken by Stanley Buckmaster KC and R. A. Wright. The test case was heard in the Chancery Division in July 1913 by a hostile judge Mr Justice Joyce. The Solicitors Act 1843 included the sentence, 'every Word importing the Masculine Gender only shall extend and be applied to a Female as well as a Male'. The judge ruled that women had no precedent and therefore he could not authorise the first as that was the role of government. The decision was unsuccessfully contested in the Court of Appeal in December 1913, heard by the Master of the Rolls Lord Cozens-Hardy, Lord Justice Swinfen Eady and Lord Justice Phillimore (included in the law reports in 1914). The four would-be lawyers continued to push forward their case using the press. Crofts devoted time to this as well as working in a solicitors office.

The British press was mostly in favour and the case helped the campaign for women's admission to the legal profession. The Sex Disqualification (Removal) Act 1919 allowed women to be lawyers. In 1919 the debate in the newspapers included speculation that the cut an thrust of advocates would be restricted because male barristers might go easy on a female opposing barrister. Ingram (then Crofts) was quoted as saying that if women "are 'intellectually incapable' it is carrying chivalry rather too far to refuse to permit them to expose themselves as failures." Crofts was the first woman to be articled when she was taken on by Trower, Still and Keeling in 1919. Bebb was expected to be the first British woman lawyer but she died giving birth to her second child in 1921.

Crofts became the precedent when she became the first woman to be qualified as a solicitor in England in January 1923. (Ivy Williams had been called to the bar the year before). She had been articled for several years and completed the law society exams the year before as the law had been changed in 1919. Of the four who had contested the legal case only Crofts succeeded in becoming a lawyer. Nettlefold would leave law and go into business, Costelloe became a psychoanalyst and Bebb died. Crofts became a partner in the law firm of Crofts, Ingram and Wyatt & Co.

In 1925 the National Council of Women of Great Britain published her book, Women Under English Law.

Ingram died at Buckingham House Mansions in London in 1965.

== Private life ==
She married a solicitor, John Cecil Crofts, in 1922. They had two children and lived in Barham Road in Wimbledon.
