= Pre-dreadnought battleship =

Battleships built from the 1880s to 1905

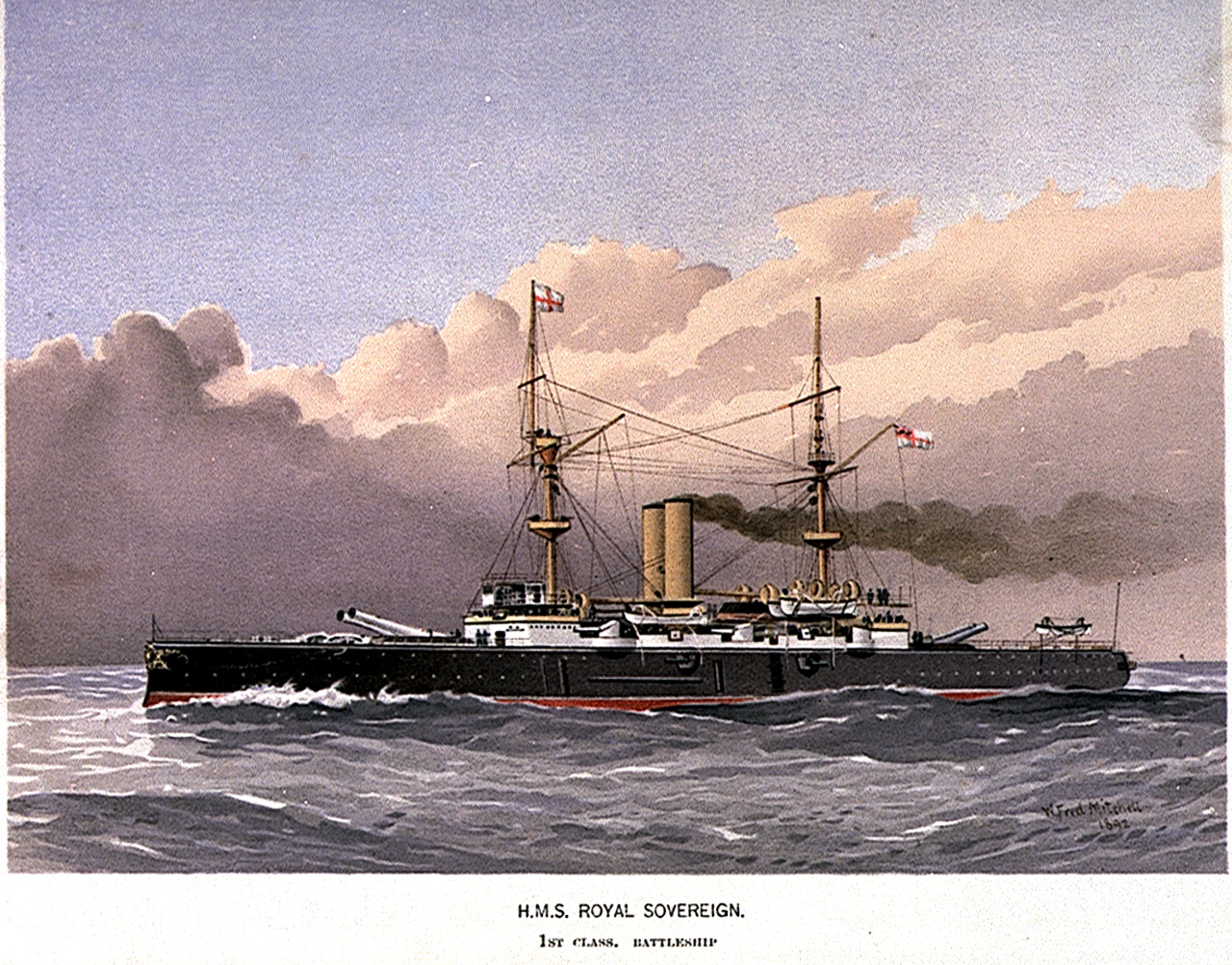
HMS Royal Sovereign (1891) was the first pre-dreadnought battleship of the Royal Navy.

Pre-dreadnought battleships were sea-going battleships built from the mid- to late- 1880s to the mid-1900s. Their designs were conceived before the appearance of HMS Dreadnought in 1906 and their classification as "pre-dreadnought" is retrospectively applied. In their day, they were simply known as "battleships" or else more rank-specific terms such as "first-class battleship" and so forth. The pre-dreadnought battleships were the pre-eminent warships of their time and replaced the ironclad battleships of the 1870s and 1880s.

In contrast to the diverse development of ironclads in preceding decades, the 1890s saw navies worldwide start to build battleships to a common design as dozens of ships essentially followed the design of the Royal Navy's Majestic class. Built from steel, protected by compound, nickel steel or case-hardened steel armor, pre-dreadnought battleships were driven by coal-fired boilers powering compound reciprocating steam engines which turned underwater screws. These ships distinctively carried a main battery of very heavy guns upon the weather deck, in large rotating mounts either fully or partially armored over, and supported by one or more secondary batteries of lighter weapons on broadside.

The similarity in appearance of battleships in the 1890s was underlined by the increasing number of ships being built. New naval powers such as Germany, Japan, the United States, and to a lesser extent Italy and Austria-Hungary, began to establish themselves with fleets of pre-dreadnoughts. Meanwhile, the battleship fleets of the United Kingdom, France, and Russia expanded to meet these new threats. The last decisive clash of pre-dreadnought fleets was between the Imperial Japanese Navy and the Imperial Russian Navy at the Battle of Tsushima on 27 May 1905.

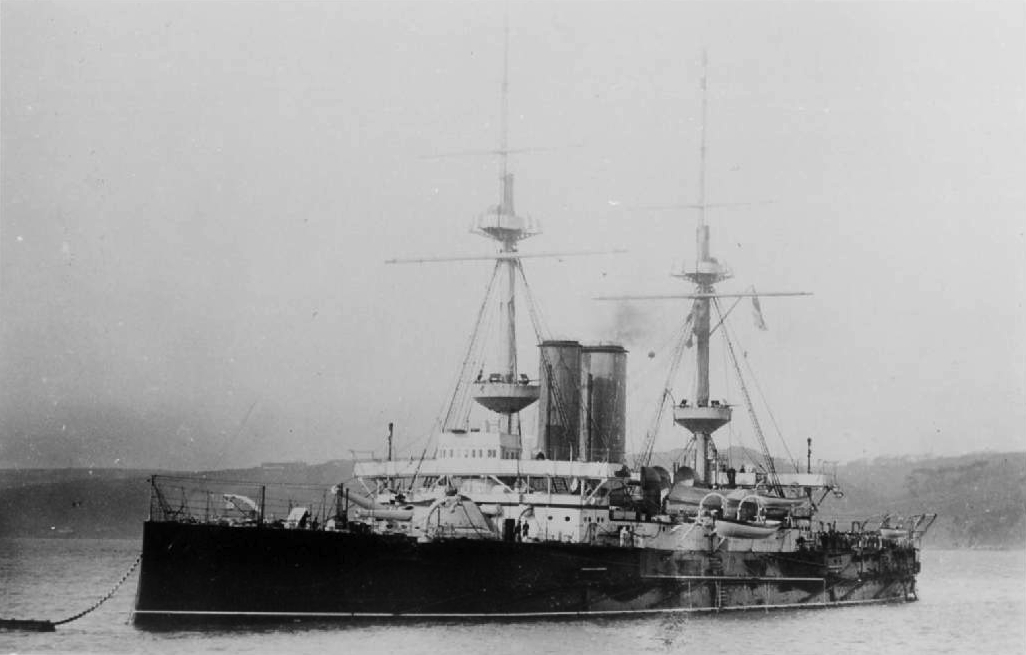
HMS Ocean was typical of pre-dreadnought battleships

These battleships were abruptly made obsolete by the arrival of HMS Dreadnought in 1906. Dreadnought followed the trend in battleship design to heavier, longer-ranged guns by adopting an "all-big-gun" armament scheme of ten 12-inch guns. Her innovative steam turbine engines also made her faster. The existing battleships were decisively outclassed, with no more being designed to their format thereafter; the new, larger and more powerful, battleships built from then on were known as dreadnoughts. This was the point at which the ships that had been laid down before were re-designated "pre-dreadnoughts".

== Evolution ==
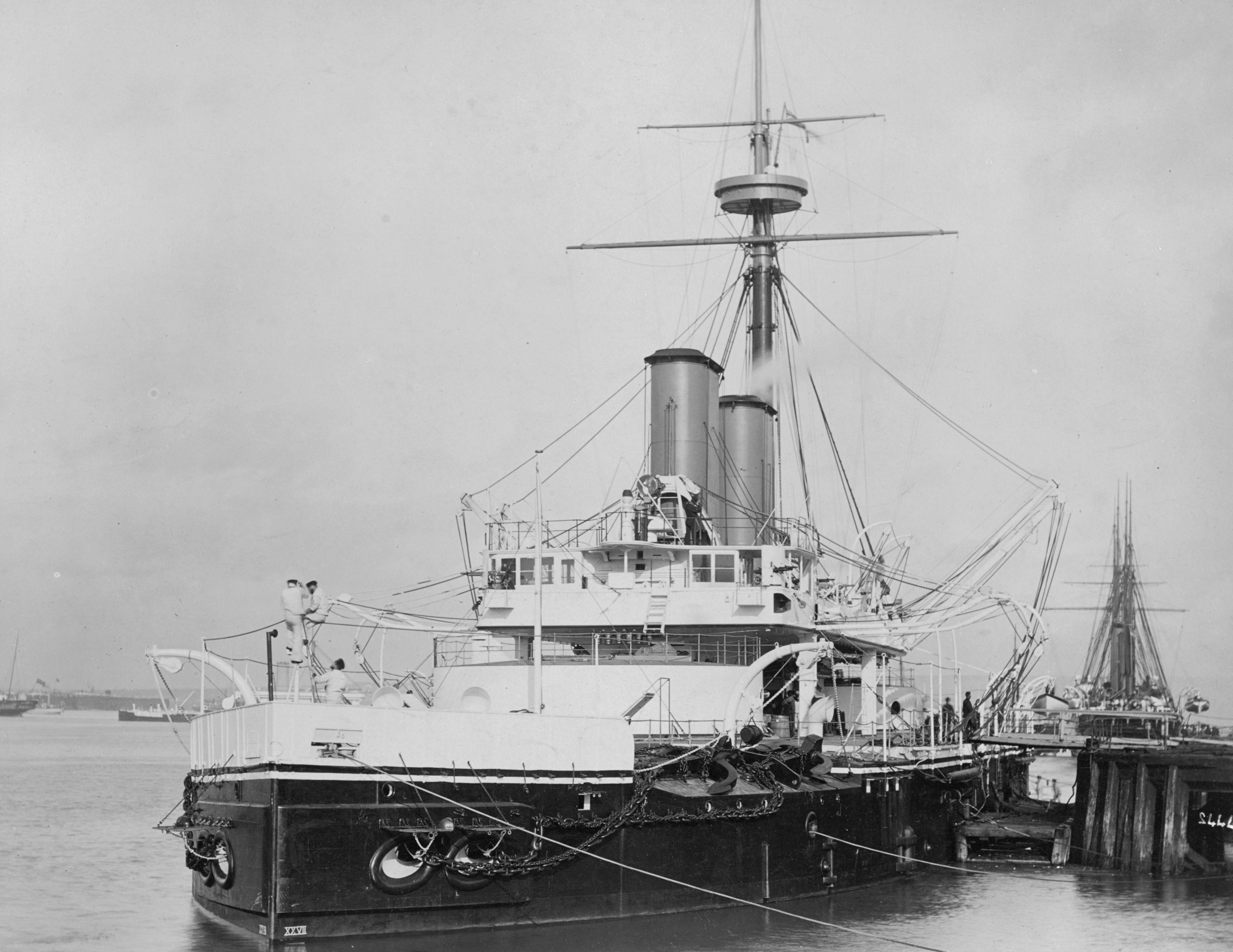
HMS Dreadnought shows the low freeboard typical for early ironclad turret-ships. This ship, launched in 1875, should not be confused with her famous successor, launched in 1906, marking the end of the pre-dreadnought era.

The pre-dreadnought developed from the ironclad battleship. The first ironclads—the French Gloire and HMS Warrior—looked much like sailing frigates, with three tall masts and broadside batteries, when they were commissioned in the early 1860s. HMVS Cerberus, the first breastwork monitor, was launched in 1868, followed in 1871 by HMS Devastation, a turreted ironclad which more resembled a pre-dreadnought than the previous, and its contemporary, turretless ironclads. Both ships dispensed with masts and carried four heavy guns in two turrets fore and aft. Devastation was the first ocean-going breastwork monitor; although her very low freeboard meant that her decks were subject to being swept by water and spray, interfering with the working of her guns. Navies worldwide continued to build masted, turretless battleships which had sufficient freeboard and were seaworthy enough to fight on the high seas.

The distinction between the coast-assault battleship and the cruising battleship became blurred with the Admiral-class ironclads, ordered in 1880. These ships reflected developments in ironclad design, being protected by iron-and-steel compound armour rather than wrought iron. Equipped with breech-loading guns of between 12-inch and 16 ¼-inch (305-mm and 413-mm) calibre, the Admirals continued the trend of ironclad warships mounting gigantic weapons. The guns were mounted in open barbettes to save weight. Some historians see these ships as a vital step towards pre-dreadnoughts; others view them as a confused and unsuccessful design.

The subsequent Royal Sovereign class of 1889 retained barbettes but were uniformly armed with 13.5-inch (343 mm) guns; they were also significantly larger (at 14,000 tons displacement) and faster (because of triple-expansion steam engines) than the Admirals. Just as importantly, the Royal Sovereigns had a higher freeboard, making them unequivocally capable of performing the high-seas battleship role.

The pre-dreadnought design reached maturity in 1895 with the Majestic class. These ships were built and armoured entirely of steel, and their guns were now mounted in fully-enclosed rotating turrets. They also adopted 12-inch (305 mm) main guns, which, because of advances in gun construction and the use of cordite propellant, were lighter and more powerful than the previous guns of larger calibre. The Majestics provided the model for battleship construction in the Royal Navy and many other navies for years to come.

== Armament ==
Pre-dreadnoughts carried guns of several different calibres, for different roles in ship-to-ship combat.

=== Main battery ===
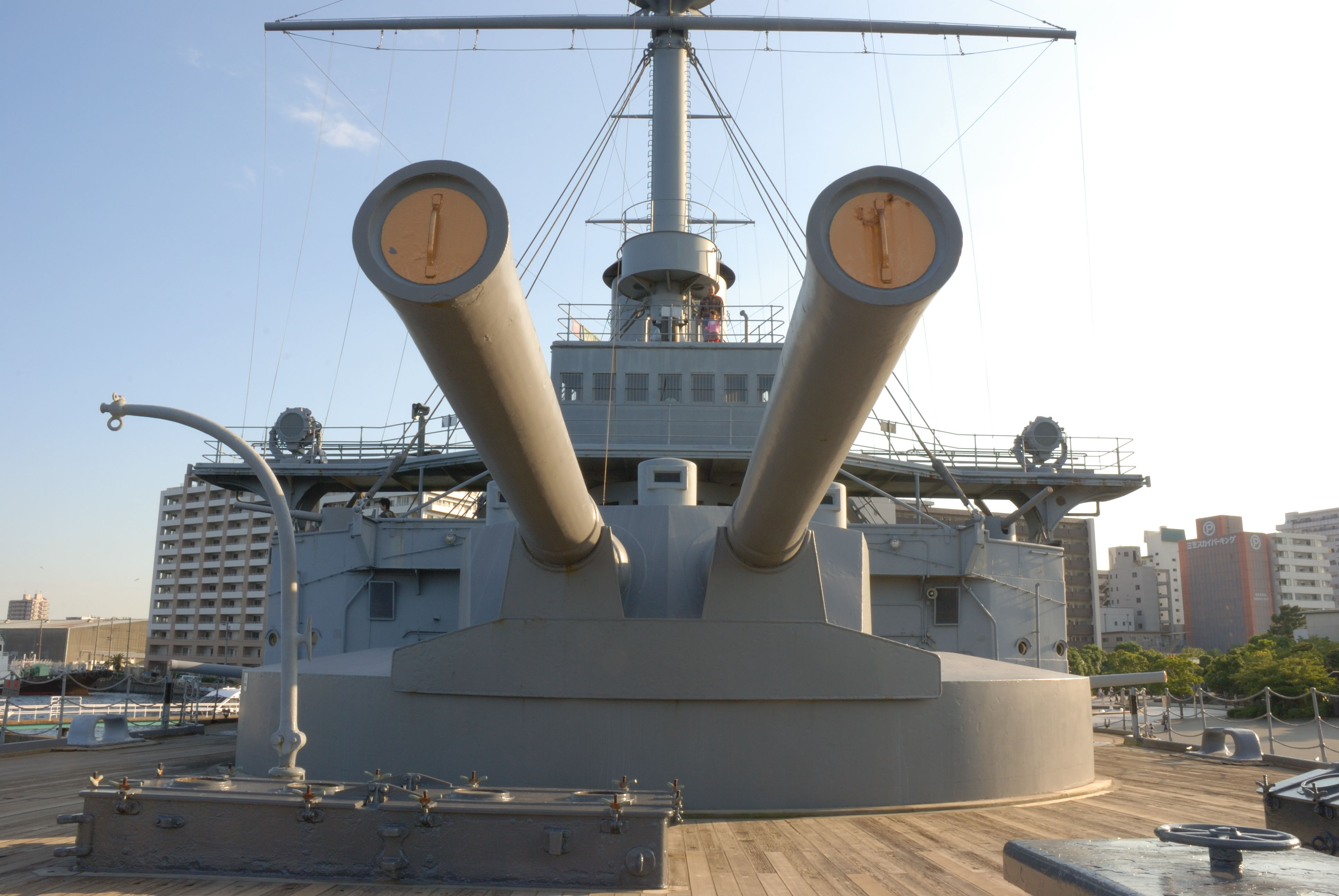
The heavy guns and forward barbette of Mikasa's main battery

Very few pre-dreadnoughts deviated from what became the classic arrangement of heavy weaponry: A main battery of four heavy guns mounted in two centre-line gunhouses fore and aft (these could be either fully enclosed barbettes or true turrets but, regardless of type, were later to be universally referred to as 'turrets'). These main guns were slow-firing, and initially of limited accuracy; but they were the only guns heavy enough to penetrate the thick armour which protected the engines, magazines, and main guns of enemy battleships.

The most common calibre for this main armament was 12-inch (305 mm), although earlier ships often had larger-calibre weapons of lower muzzle velocity (guns in the 13-inch to 14-inch range) and some designs used smaller guns because they could attain higher rates of fire. All British first-class battleships from the Majestic class onwards carried 12-inch weapons, as did French battleships from the Charlemagne class, laid down in 1894. Japan, importing most of its guns from Britain, used this calibre also. The United States used both 12-inch and 13-inch (330 mm) guns for most of the 1890s until the Maine class, laid down in 1899 (not the earlier Maine of Spanish–American War notoriety), after which the 12-inch gun was universal. The Russians used both 12 and 10-inch (254 mm) guns as their main armament; the Petropavlovsk class, Retvizan, Tsesarevich, and Borodino class had 12-inch (305 mm) main batteries while the Peresvet class mounted 10-inch guns. The first German pre-dreadnought class used an 11-inch (279 mm) gun but decreased to a 9.4-inch (239 mm) gun for the two following classes and returned to 11-inch guns with the Braunschweig class.

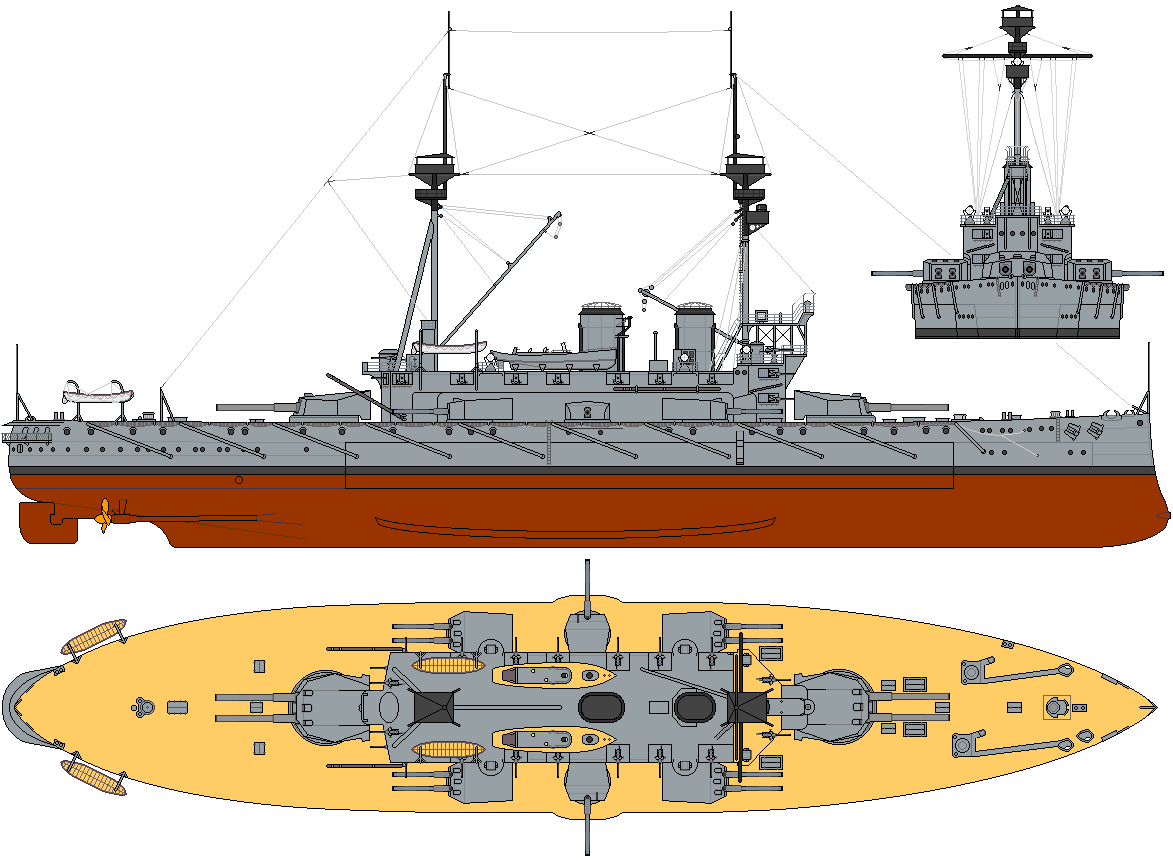
HMS Agamemnon, an example of taking the intermediate battery principle to its ultimate expression with ten 9.2-inch guns

While the calibre of the main battery remained generally constant, the performance of the guns improved as longer barrels were introduced. The introduction of slow-burning nitrocellulose and cordite propellant allowed the employment of a longer barrel, and therefore higher muzzle velocity—giving greater range and penetrating power for the same calibre of shell. Between the Majestic class and Dreadnought, the length of the British 12-inch gun increased from 35 calibres to 45 and muzzle velocity increased from 706 metres (2,317 ft) per second to 770 metres (2,525 ft) per second.

=== Secondary battery ===
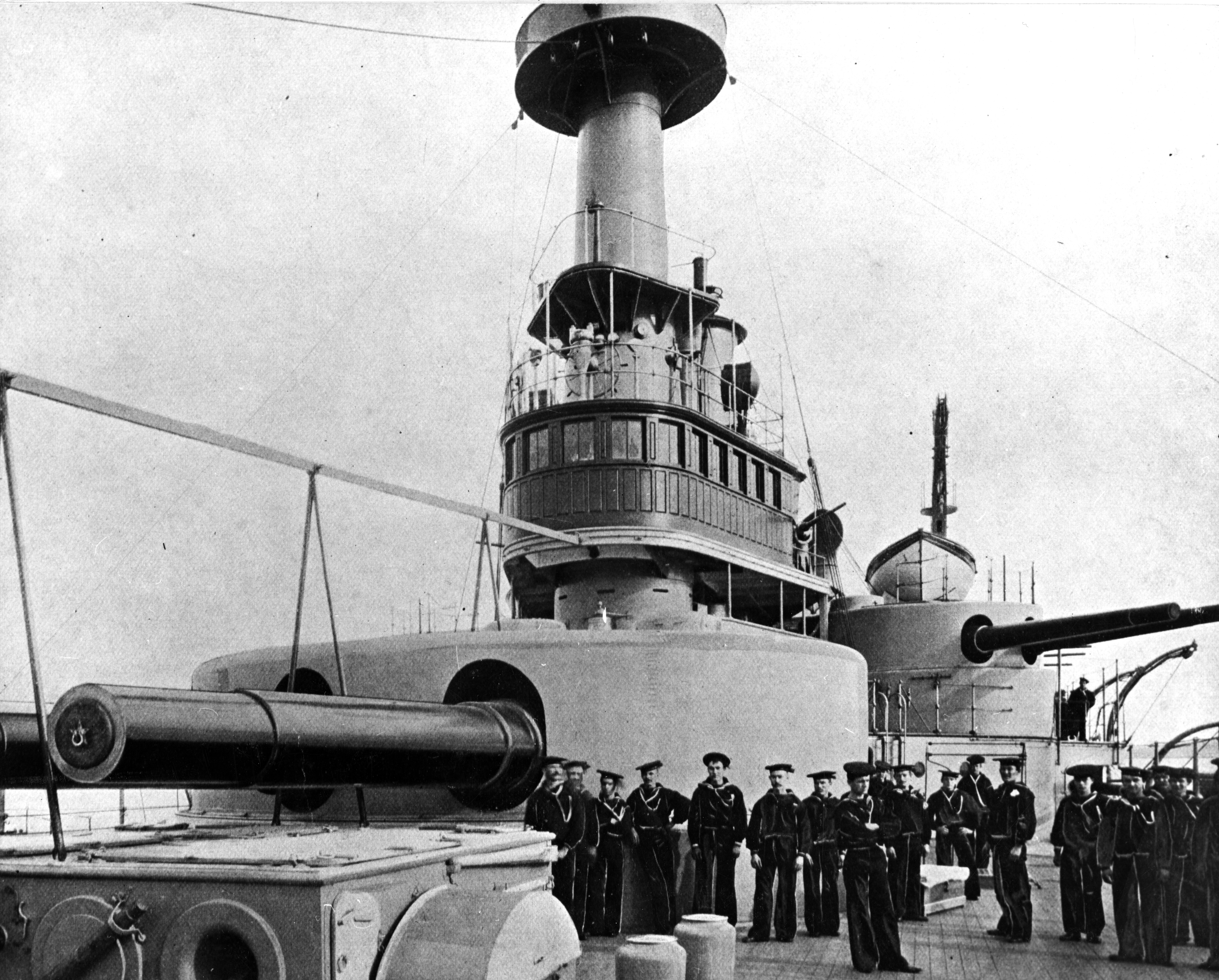
USS Indiana, an example of the intermediate battery principle with its forward 13-inch and forward port 8-inch (203 mm) gun turrets

Pre-dreadnoughts also carried a secondary battery of smaller guns, typically 6-inch (152 mm), though calibres from 4 to 9.4 inches (100 to 240 mm) were used. Virtually all secondary guns were "quick firing", employing a number of innovations to increase the rate of fire. The propellant was provided in a brass cartridge, and both the breech mechanism and the mounting were suitable for rapid aiming and reloading. A principal role of the secondary battery was to damage the less armoured parts of an enemy battleship; while unable to penetrate the main armour belt, it might score hits on lightly armoured areas like the bridge, or start fires. Equally important, the secondary armament was to be used against smaller enemy vessels such as cruisers, destroyers, and even torpedo boats. A medium-calibre gun could be expected to penetrate the light armour of smaller ships, while the rate of fire of the secondary battery was important in scoring a hit against a small, maneuvrable target. Secondary guns were mounted in a variety of ways; sometimes carried in turrets, they were just as often positioned in fixed armoured casemates in the side of the hull, or in unarmored positions on upper decks.

=== Intermediate battery ===
Some of the pre-dreadnoughts carried an "intermediate" battery, typically of 8-to-10-inch (203 to 254 mm) calibre. The intermediate battery was a method of packing more heavy firepower into the same battleship, principally of use against battleships or at long ranges. The United States Navy pioneered the intermediate battery concept in the Indiana, Iowa, and Kearsarge classes, but not in the battleships laid down between 1897 and 1901. Shortly after the USN re-adopted the intermediate battery, the British, Italian, Russian, French, and Japanese navies laid down intermediate-battery ships. Almost all of this later generation of intermediate-battery ships finished building after Dreadnought, and hence were obsolescent before completion.

=== Tertiary battery ===
The pre-dreadnought's armament was completed by a tertiary battery of light, rapid-fire guns, of any calibre from 3 inches (76 mm) down to machine guns. Their role was to give short-range protection against torpedo boats, or to attack the deck and superstructure of a battleship.

=== Torpedoes ===
In addition to their gun armament, many pre-dreadnought battleships were armed with torpedoes, fired from fixed tubes located either just above or below the waterline. By the pre-dreadnought era the torpedo was typically 18-inch (457 mm) in diameter and had an effective range of several thousand meters. However, it was virtually unknown for a battleship to score a hit with a torpedo. The primary intention of these weapons was to deliver a coup de grace to a heavily damaged or disabled opposing battleship, as opposed to the direct attack employed by destroyers and torpedo boats.

=== Range of combat ===
During the ironclad age, the range of engagements increased; in the Sino-Japanese War of 1894–95 battles were fought at distances of around 1 mile (1.6 km); while in the Battle of the Yellow Sea in 1904, the Russian and Japanese fleets had opened fire at over 8 miles (13 km), before settling down to fight at ranges of 3.5 miles (5.6 km). The increase in engagement range was due in part to the longer range of torpedoes, and in part to improved gunnery and fire control. In consequence, shipbuilders tended towards heavier secondary armament, of the same calibre that the "intermediate" battery had been; the Royal Navy's last pre-dreadnought class, the Lord Nelson class, carried ten 9.2-inch guns as secondary armament. Ships with a uniform, heavy secondary battery are often referred to as "semi-dreadnoughts".

== Protection ==
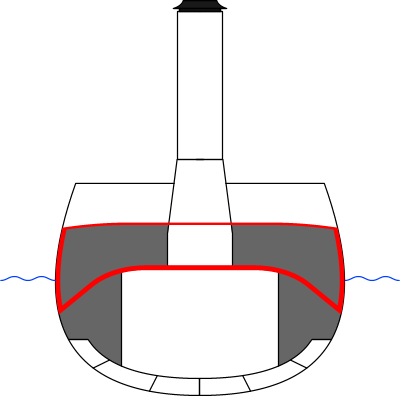
Schematic section of a typical pre-dreadnought battleship with an armoured upper and middle deck and side belt (red), lateral protective coal bunkers (grey), and a double-bottom of watertight compartments. The machinery was arranged in the protected internal void.

Pre-dreadnought battleships carried a considerable weight of steel armour, providing them with effective defence against the great majority of naval guns in service during the period. 'Medium' calibre guns up to 8-9.4 inch would generally prove incapable of piercing their thickest armour, while it still provided some measure of defence against even the 'heavy' guns of the day which were considered capable of piercing these plates.

=== Vertical side armour ===
Experience with the first generations of ironclads showed that rather than giving the ship's entire length uniform armour protection, it was best to concentrate armour in greater thickness over limited but critical areas. Therefore the central section of the hull, which housed the boilers and engines, was protected by the main belt, which ran from just below the waterline to some distance above it. This "central citadel" was intended to protect the engines from even the most powerful shells. Yet the emergence of the quick-firing gun and high explosives in the 1880s meant that the 1870s to early 1880s concept of the pure central citadel was also inadequate in the 1890s and that thinner armour extensions towards the extremities would greatly aid the ship's defensive qualities. Thus, the main belt armour would normally taper to a lesser thickness along the side of the hull towards bow and stern; it might also taper up from the central citadel towards the superstructure.

=== Other armour ===
The main armament and the magazines were protected by projections of thick armour from the main belt. The beginning of the pre-dreadnought era was marked by a move from mounting the main armament in open barbettes to an all-enclosed, turret mounting.

The deck was typically lightly armoured with 2 to 4 inches (5.1 to 10.2 cm) of steel. This lighter armour was to prevent high-explosive shells from wrecking the superstructure of the ship.

The majority of battleships during this period of construction were fitted with a heavily-armoured conning tower, or CT, which was intended for the use of the command staff during battle. This was protected by a vertical, full height, ring of armour nearly equivalent in thickness to the main battery gunhouses and provided with observation slits. A narrow armoured tube extended down below this to the citadel; this contained & protected the various voice-tubes used for communication from the CT to various key stations during battle.

=== Metallurgical advances in armour ===
The battleships of the late 1880s, for instance the Royal Sovereign class, were armoured with iron and steel compound armour. This was soon replaced with more effective case-hardened steel armour made using the Harvey process developed in the United States. First tested in 1891, Harvey armour was commonplace in ships laid down from 1893 to 1895. However, its reign was brief; in 1895, the German Kaiser Friedrich III pioneered the superior Krupp armour. Europe adopted Krupp plate within five years, and only the United States persisted in using Harvey steel into the 20th century. The improving quality of armour plate meant that new ships could have better protection from a thinner and lighter armour belt; 12 inches (300 mm) of compound armour provided the same protection as just 7.5 inches (190 mm) of Harvey armour or 5.75 inches (146 mm) of Krupp armour.

== Propulsion ==
The working of a triple-expansion steam engine. High-pressure steam is used three times to produce motive power, gradually cooling as it travelled.

Almost all pre-dreadnoughts were powered by reciprocating steam engines. Most were capable of top speeds between 16 to 18 knots (18 to 21 mph; 30 to 33 km/h). The ironclads of the 1880s used compound engines, and by the end of the 1880s the even-more efficient triple expansion compound engine was in use. Some fleets, though not the British, adopted the quadruple-expansion steam engine.

The main improvement in engine performance during the pre-dreadnought period came from the adoption of increasingly higher pressure steam from the boiler. Scotch marine boilers were superseded by more compact water-tube boilers, allowing higher-pressure steam to be produced with less fuel consumption. Water-tube boilers were also safer, with less risk of explosion, and more flexible than fire-tube types. The Belleville-type water-tube boiler had been introduced in the French fleet as early as 1879, but it took until 1894 for the Royal Navy to adopt it for armoured cruisers and pre-dreadnoughts; other water-tube boilers followed in navies worldwide.

The engines drove either two or three screw propellers. France and Germany preferred the three-screw approach, which allowed the engines to be shorter and hence more easily protected; they were also more maneuverable and had better resistance to accidental damage. Triple screws were, however, generally larger and heavier than the twin-screw arrangements preferred by most other navies.

Coal was the almost exclusive fuel for the pre-dreadnought period, though navies made the first experiments with oil propulsion in the late 1890s. An extra knot or two of speed could be gained for short bursts by applying a 'forced draught' to the furnaces, where air was pumped into the furnaces, but this risked damage to the boilers if used for prolonged periods.

The French built the only class of turbine powered pre-dreadnought battleships, the Danton class of 1907.

== Pre-dreadnought fleets and battles ==
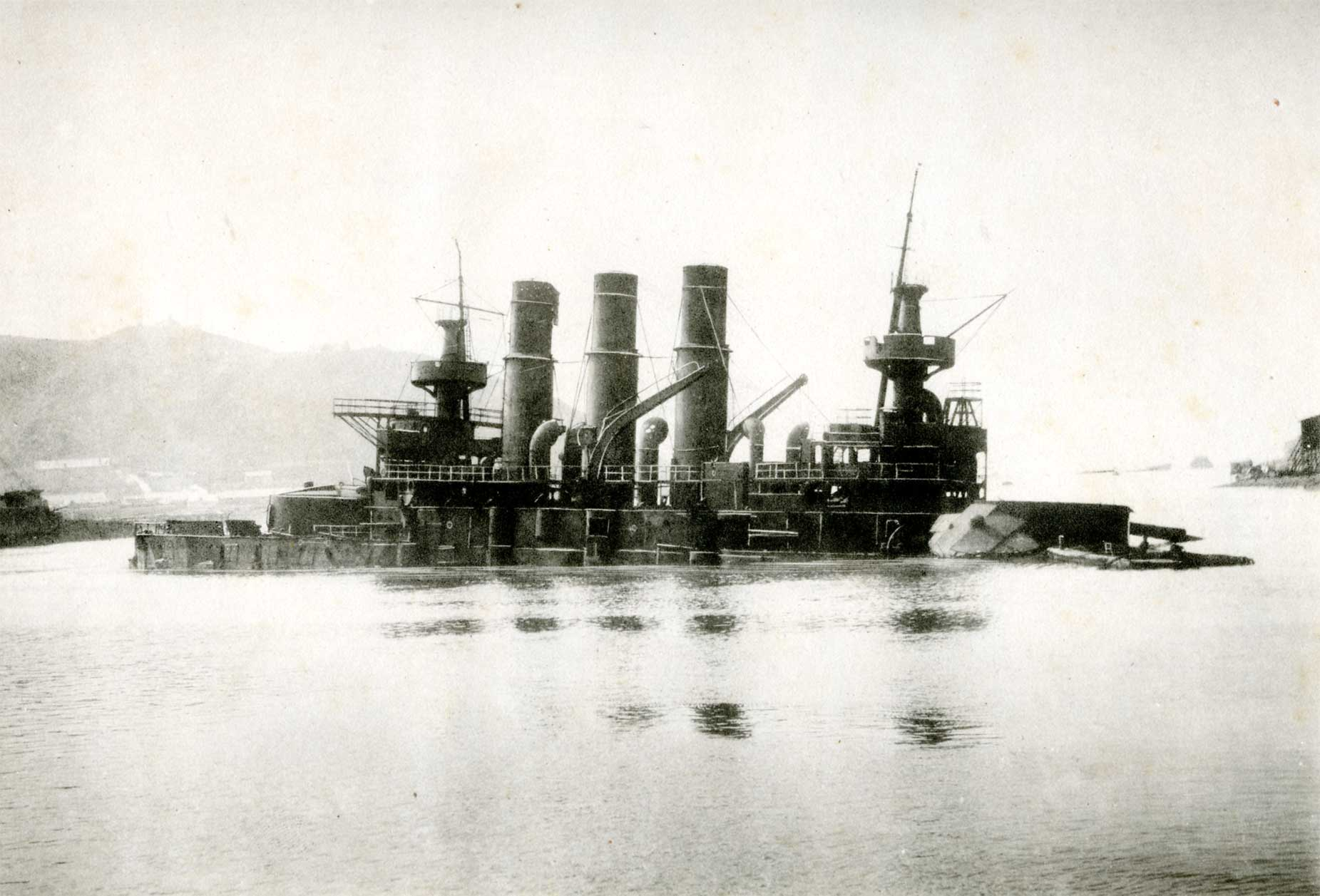
The Retvizan sinks in Port Arthur, 1904

The pre-dreadnought battleship in its heyday was the core of a very diverse navy. Many older ironclads were still in service. Battleships served alongside cruisers of many descriptions: modern armoured cruisers which were essentially cut-down battleships, lighter protected cruisers, and even older unarmored cruisers, sloops and frigates whether built out of steel, iron or wood. The battleships were threatened by torpedo boats; it was during the pre-dreadnought era that the first destroyers were constructed to deal with the torpedo-boat threat, though at the same time the first effective submarines were being constructed.

The pre-dreadnought age saw the beginning of the end of the 19th century naval balance of power in which France and Russia vied for competition against the massive Royal Navy, and saw the start of the rise of the "new naval powers" of Germany, Japan and the United States. The new ships of the Imperial Japanese Navy and to a lesser extent the U.S. Navy supported those powers' colonial expansion.

While pre-dreadnoughts were adopted worldwide, there were no clashes between pre-dreadnought battleships until the very end of their period of dominance. The First Sino-Japanese War in 1894–95 influenced pre-dreadnought development, but this had been a clash between Chinese battleships and a Japanese fleet consisting of mostly cruisers. The Spanish–American War of 1898 was also a mismatch, with the American pre-dreadnought fleet engaging Spanish shore batteries at San Juan and then a Spanish squadron of armoured cruisers and destroyers at the Battle of Santiago de Cuba. Not until the Russo-Japanese War of 1904–05 did pre-dreadnoughts engage on an equal footing. This happened in three battles: the Russian tactical victory during the Battle of Port Arthur on 8–9 February 1904, the indecisive Battle of the Yellow Sea on 10 August 1904, and the decisive Japanese victory at the Battle of Tsushima on 27 May 1905. These battles upended prevailing theories of how naval battles would be fought, as the fleets began firing at one another at much greater distances than before; naval architects realized that plunging fire (explosive shells falling on their targets largely from above, instead of from a trajectory close to horizontal) was a much greater threat than had been thought.

Gunboat diplomacy was typically conducted by cruisers or smaller warships. A British squadron of three protected cruisers and two gunboats brought about the capitulation of Zanzibar in 1896; and while battleships participated in the combined fleet Western powers deployed during the Boxer Rebellion, the naval part of the action was performed by gunboats, destroyers and sloops.

=== Europe ===
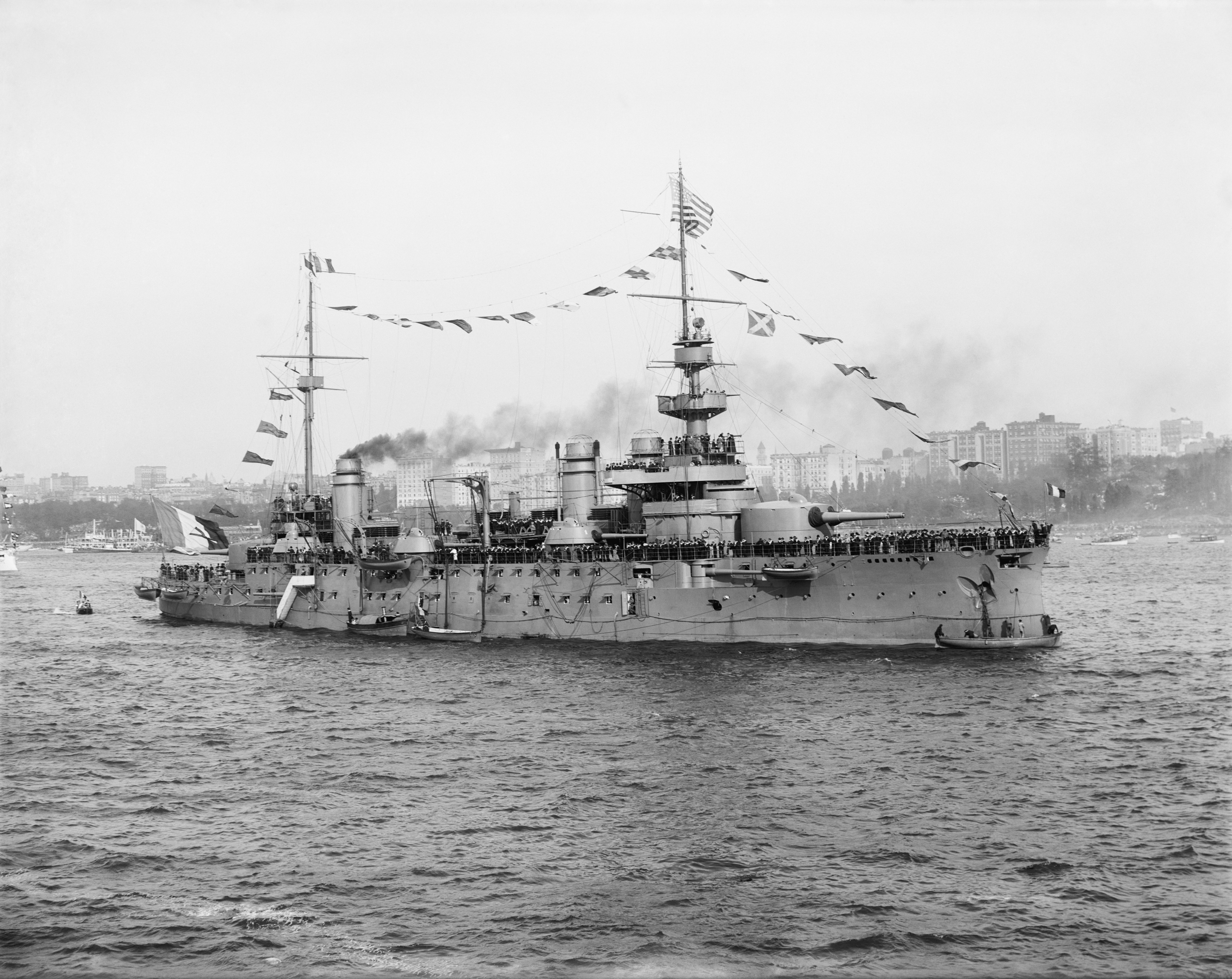
The French battleship Justice in 1909

European navies remained dominant in the pre-dreadnought era. The Royal Navy remained the world's largest fleet, though both Britain's traditional naval rivals and the new European powers increasingly asserted themselves against its supremacy.

In 1889, Britain formally adopted a "two-power standard" committing it to building enough battleships to exceed the two largest other navies combined; at the time, this meant France and Russia, which became formally allied in the early 1890s. The Royal Sovereign and Majestic classes were followed by a regular program of construction at a much quicker pace than in previous years. The Canopus, Formidable, Duncan and King Edward VII classes appeared in rapid succession from 1897 to 1905. Counting two ships ordered by Chile but taken over by the British, the Royal Navy had 50 pre-dreadnought battleships ready or being built by 1904, from the 1889 Naval Defence Act's ten units onwards. Over a dozen older battleships remained in service. The last two British pre-dreadnoughts, the "semi-dreadnought" Lord Nelsons, appeared after Dreadnought herself.

France, Britain's traditional naval rival, had paused its battleship building during the 1880s because of the influence of the Jeune École (Young School) doctrine, which favoured torpedo boats over battleships. After the Jeune École's influence faded, the first French battleship laid down was Brennus, in 1889. Brennus and the ships which followed her were individual, as opposed to the large classes of British ships; they also carried an idiosyncratic arrangement of heavy guns, with Brennus carrying three 13.4-inch (340 mm) guns and the ships which followed carrying two 12-inch and two 10.8-inch guns in single turrets. The Charlemagne class, laid down 1894–1896, were the first to adopt the standard four 12-inch (305 mm) gun heavy armament. The Jeune École retained a strong influence on French naval strategy, and by the end of the 19th century France had abandoned competition with Britain in battleship numbers. The French suffered the most from the dreadnought revolution, with four ships of the Liberté class still building when Dreadnought launched, and a further six of the Danton class begun afterwards.

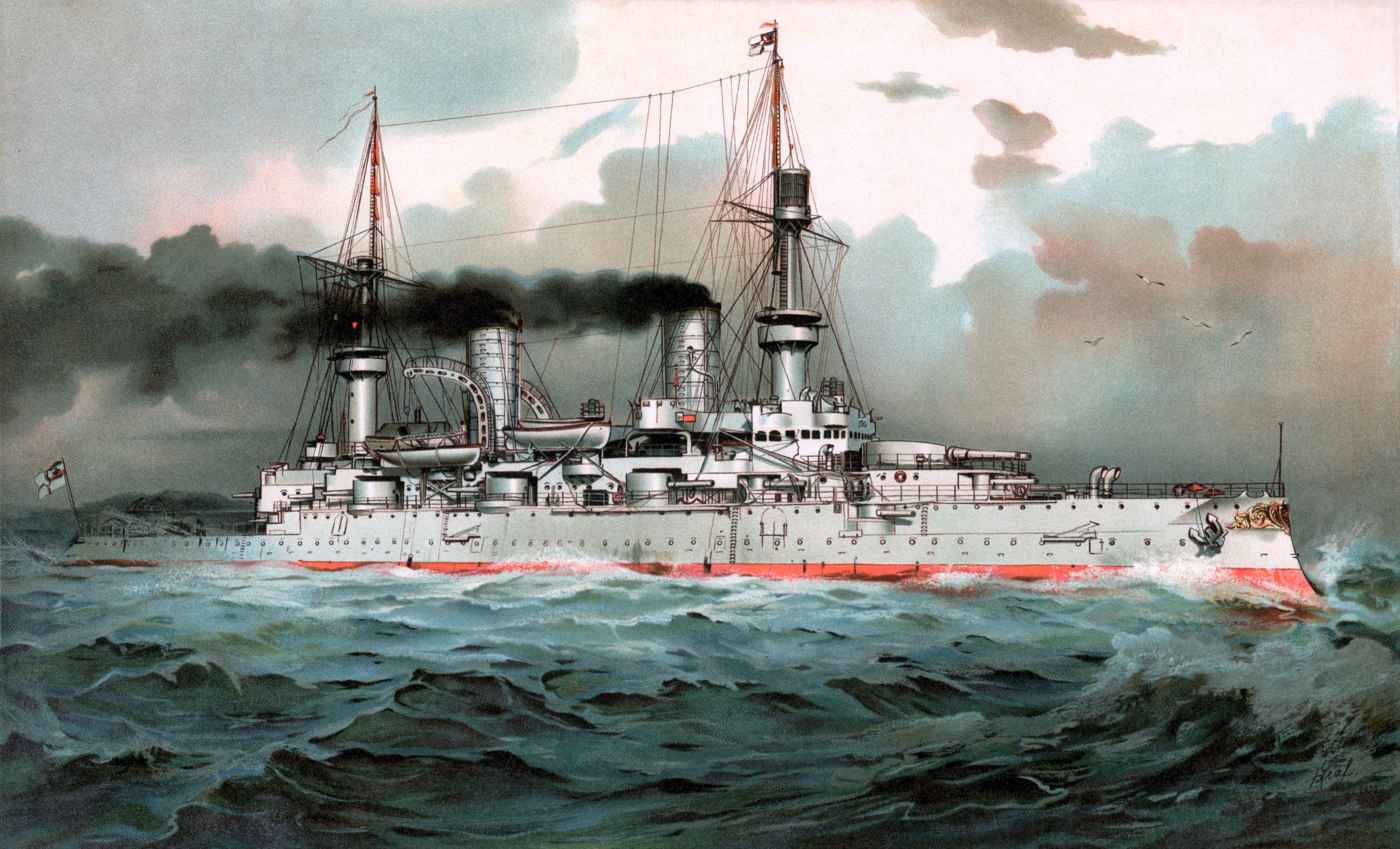
Lithograph of the German Kaiser Wilhelm II of the Kaiser Friedrich III class, c. 1900

Germany's first pre-dreadnoughts, the Brandenburg class, were laid down in 1890. By 1905, a further 19 battleships were built or under construction, thanks to the sharp increase in naval expenditure justified by the 1898 and 1900 Navy Laws. This increase was due to the determination of the navy chief Alfred von Tirpitz and the growing sense of national rivalry with the UK. Besides the Brandenburg class, German pre-dreadnoughts include the ships of the Kaiser Friedrich III, Wittelsbach, and Braunschweig classes—culminating in the Deutschland class, which served in both world wars. On the whole, the German ships were less powerful than their British equivalents but equally robust.

Russia equally entered into a program of naval expansion in the 1890s; one of Russia's main objectives was to maintain its interests against Japanese expansion in the Far East. The Petropavlovsk class begun in 1892 took after the British Royal Sovereigns; later ships showed more French influence on their designs, such as the Borodino class. The weakness of Russian shipbuilding meant that many ships were built overseas for Russia; the best ship, the Retvizan, being largely constructed in the United States. The Russo-Japanese War of 1904–05 was a disaster for the Russian pre-dreadnoughts; of the 15 battleships completed since Petropavlovsk, eleven were sunk or captured during the war. One of these, the famous Potemkin, mutinied and was briefly taken over by Romania at the end of the mutiny. However, she was soon recovered and recommissioned as Panteleimon. After the war, Russia completed four more pre-dreadnoughts after 1905.

Between 1893 and 1904, Italy laid down eight battleships; the later two classes of ship were remarkably fast, though the Regina Margherita class was poorly protected and the Regina Elena class lightly armed. In some ways, these ships presaged the concept of the battlecruiser. The Austro-Hungarian Empire also saw a naval renaissance during the 1890s, though of the nine pre-dreadnought battleships ordered only the three of the Habsburg class arrived before Dreadnought made them obsolete.

=== America and the Pacific ===
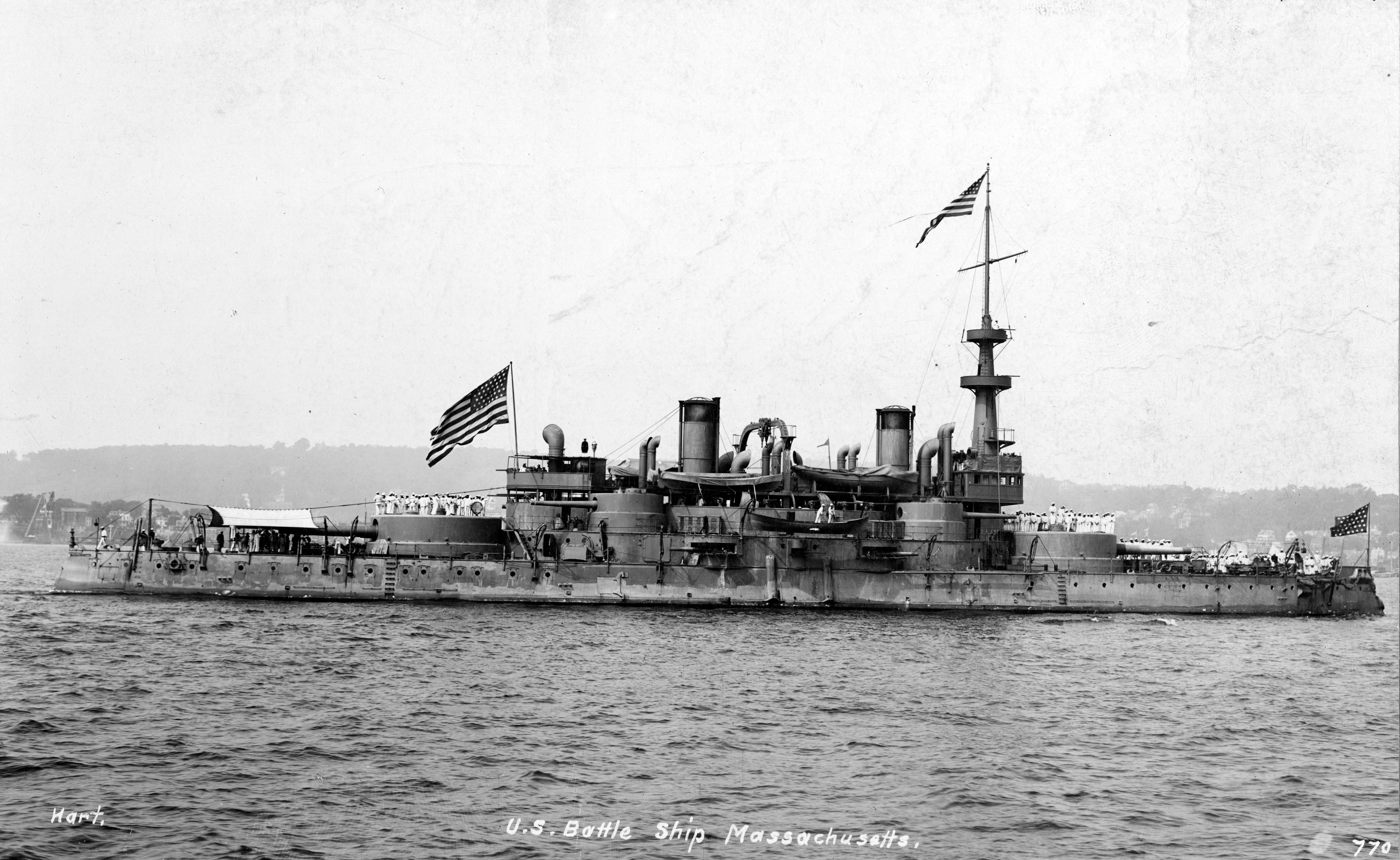
USS Massachusetts, a pre-dreadnought battleship launched in 1893

The United States started building its first battleships in 1891. These ships were short-range coast-defence battleships that were similar to the British HMS Hood except for an innovative intermediate battery of 8-inch guns. The US Navy continued to build ships that were relatively short-range and poor in heavy seas, until the Virginia class laid down in 1901–02. Nevertheless, it was these earlier ships that ensured American naval dominance against the antiquated Spanish fleet—which included no pre-dreadnoughts—in the Spanish–American War, most notably at the Battle of Santiago de Cuba. The final two classes of American pre-dreadnoughts (the Connecticuts and Mississippis) were completed after the completion of the Dreadnought and after the start of design work on the USN's own initial class of dreadnoughts. The US Great White Fleet of 16 pre-dreadnought battleships circumnavigated the world from 16 December 1907, to 22 February 1909.

Japan was involved in two of the three major naval wars of the pre-dreadnought era. The first Japanese pre-dreadnought battleships, the Fuji class, were still being built at the outbreak of the First Sino-Japanese War of 1894–95, which saw Japanese armoured cruisers and protected cruisers defeat the Chinese Beiyang Fleet, composed of a mixture of old ironclad battleships and cruisers, at the Battle of the Yalu River. Following their victory, and facing Russian pressure in the region, the Japanese placed orders for four more pre-dreadnoughts; along with the two Fujis these battleships formed the core of the fleet which twice engaged the numerically superior Russian fleets at the Battle of the Yellow Sea and the Battle of Tsushima. After capturing eight Russian battleships of various ages, Japan built several more classes of pre-dreadnoughts after the Russo-Japanese War.

== Obsolescence ==
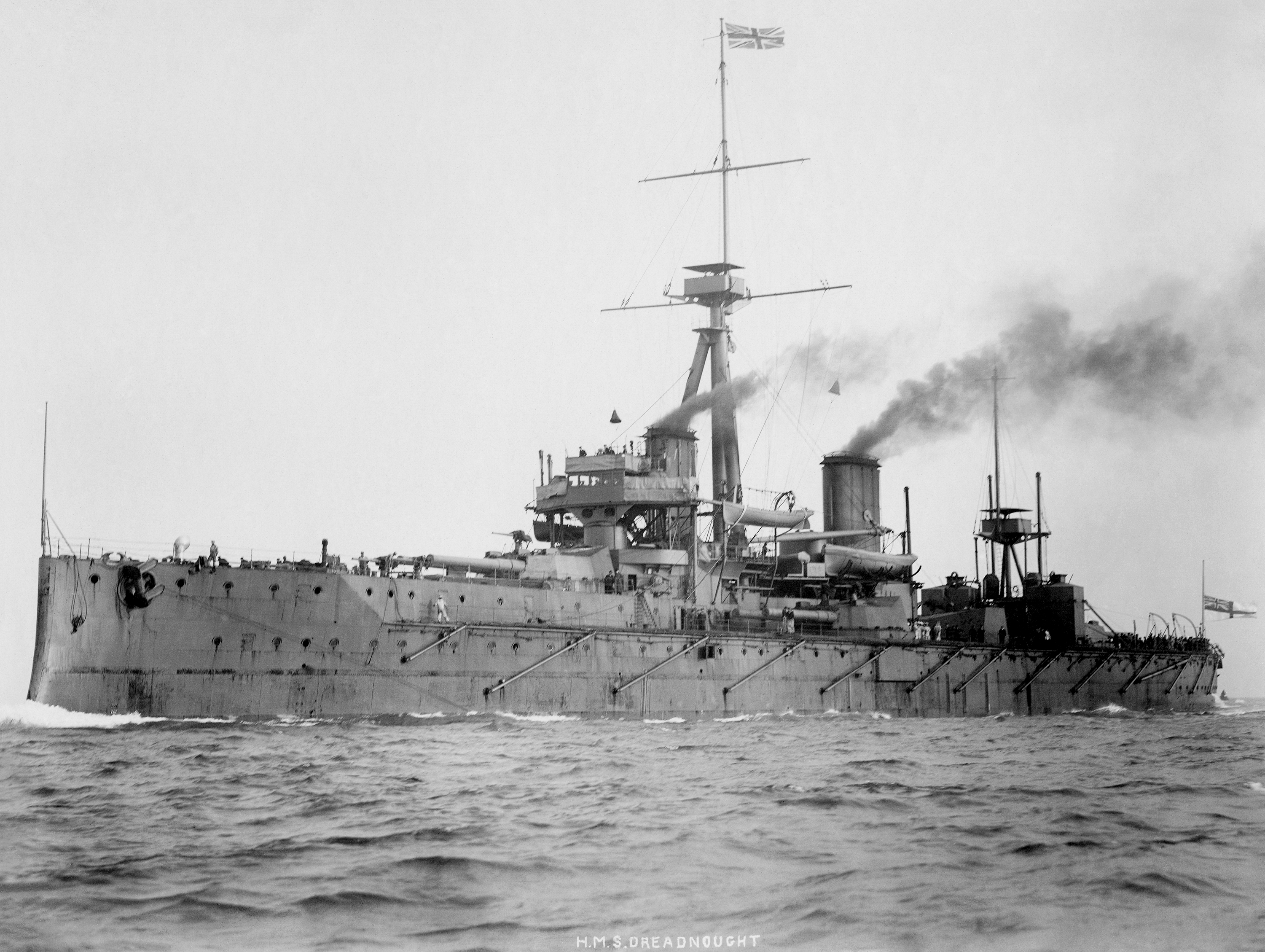
The appearance of HMS Dreadnought in 1906 rendered every other battleship obsolete

In 1906 the commissioning of HMS Dreadnought brought about the obsolescence of all existing battleships. Dreadnought, by scrapping the secondary battery, was able to carry ten 12-inch (305 mm) guns rather than four. She could fire eight heavy guns broadside, as opposed to four from a pre-dreadnought; and six guns ahead, as opposed to two. The move to an "all-big-gun" design was a logical conclusion of the increasingly long engagement ranges and heavier secondary batteries of the last pre-dreadnoughts; Japan and the United States had designed ships with a similar armament before Dreadnought, but were unable to complete them before the British ship. It was felt that because of the longer distances at which battles could be fought, only the largest guns were effective in battle, and by mounting more 12-inch guns Dreadnought was two to three times more effective in combat than an existing battleship.

The armament of the new breed of ships was not their only crucial advantage. Dreadnought used steam turbines for propulsion, giving her a top speed of 21 knots (24 mph; 39 km/h), against the 18 knots (21 mph; 33 km/h) typical of the pre-dreadnought battleships. Able both to outgun and outmaneuver their opponents, the dreadnought battleships decisively outclassed earlier battleship designs.

Nevertheless, pre-dreadnoughts continued in active service and saw significant combat use even when obsolete. Dreadnoughts and battlecruisers were believed vital for the decisive naval battles which at the time all nations expected, hence they were jealously guarded against the risk of damage by mines or submarine attack, and kept close to home as much as possible. The obsolescence and consequent expendability of the pre-dreadnoughts meant that they could be deployed into more dangerous situations and more far-flung areas.

=== World War I ===
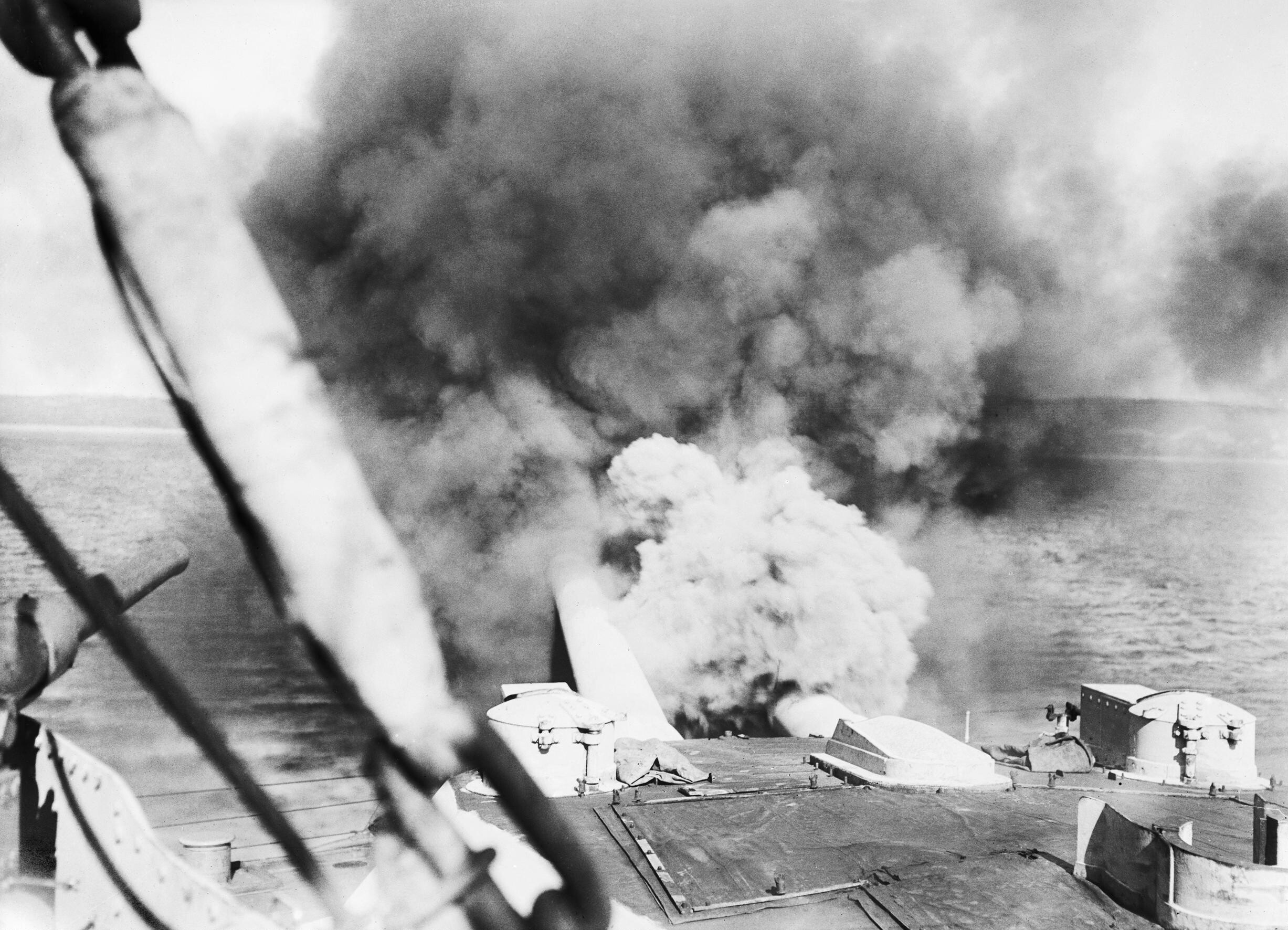
HMS Canopus fires her 12-inch main guns at a Turkish shore battery (1915). Photo by Ernest Brooks.

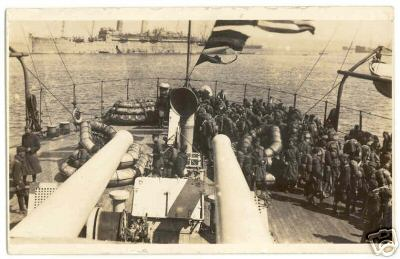
Postcard of USS Connecticut being used for troop transport in 1919

During World War I a large number of pre-dreadnoughts remained in service. The advances in machinery and armament meant that a pre-dreadnought was not necessarily the equal of even a modern armoured cruiser, and was totally outclassed by a modern dreadnought battleship or battlecruiser. Nevertheless, the pre-dreadnought played a major role in the war.

This was first illustrated in the skirmishes between British and German navies around South America in 1914. While two German cruisers menaced British shipping, the Admiralty insisted that no battlecruisers could be spared from the main fleet and sent to the other side of the world to deal with them. Instead the British dispatched a pre-dreadnought of 1896 vintage, HMS Canopus. Intended to stiffen the British cruisers in the area, in fact her slow speed meant that she was left behind at the disastrous Battle of Coronel. Canopus redeemed herself at the Battle of the Falkland Islands, but only when grounded to act as a harbour-defence vessel; she fired at extreme range (13,500 yards, 12,300 m) on the German cruiser SMS Gneisenau, and while the only hit was from an inert practice shell which had been left loaded from the previous night (the "live" shells of the salvo broke up on contact with water; one inert shell ricocheted into one of Gneisenau's funnels), this certainly deterred Gneisenau. The subsequent battle was decided by the two Invincible-class battlecruisers which had been dispatched after Coronel.

In the Black Sea five Russian pre-dreadnoughts saw brief action against the Ottoman battlecruiser Yavuz Sultan Selim during the Battle of Cape Sarych in November 1914. Two of the Russian pre-dreadnoughts briefly engaged Yavuz Sultan Selim again in May 1915.

The principle that disposable pre-dreadnoughts could be used where no modern ship could be risked was affirmed by British, French and German navies in subsidiary theatres of war. The German navy used its pre-dreadnoughts frequently in the Baltic campaign. However, the largest number of pre-dreadnoughts was engaged at the Gallipoli campaign. Twelve British and French pre-dreadnoughts formed the bulk of the force which attempted to "force the Dardanelles" in March 1915. The role of the pre-dreadnoughts was to support the brand-new dreadnought HMS Queen Elizabeth engaging the Turkish shore defences. Three of the pre-dreadnoughts were sunk by mines, and several more badly damaged. However, it was not the damage to the pre-dreadnoughts which led to the operation being called off. The two battlecruisers were also damaged; since Queen Elizabeth could not be risked in the minefield, and the pre-dreadnoughts would be unable to deal with the Turkish battlecruiser lurking on the other side of the straits, the operation had failed. Pre-dreadnoughts were also used to support the Gallipoli landings, with the loss of three more: HMS Goliath, HMS Triumph and HMS Majestic. In return, a pair of Ottoman pre-dreadnoughts, the ex-German Turgut Reis and Barbaros Hayreddin, bombarded Allied forces during the Gallipoli campaign until the latter was torpedoed and sunk by a British submarine in 1915.

A squadron of German pre-dreadnoughts was present at the Battle of Jutland in 1916; German sailors called them the "five-minute ships", which was the amount of time they were expected to survive in a pitched battle. In spite of their limitations, the pre-dreadnought squadron played a useful role. As the German fleet disengaged from the battle, the pre-dreadnoughts risked themselves by turning on the British battlefleet as dark set. Nevertheless, only one of the pre-dreadnoughts was sunk: SMS Pommern went down in the confused night action as the battlefleets disengaged.

Following the November 1918 Armistice, the U.S. Navy converted fifteen older battleships, eight armoured cruisers and two larger protected cruisers for temporary service as transports. These ships made one to six trans-Atlantic round-trips each, bringing home a total of more than 145,000 passengers.

=== World War II ===
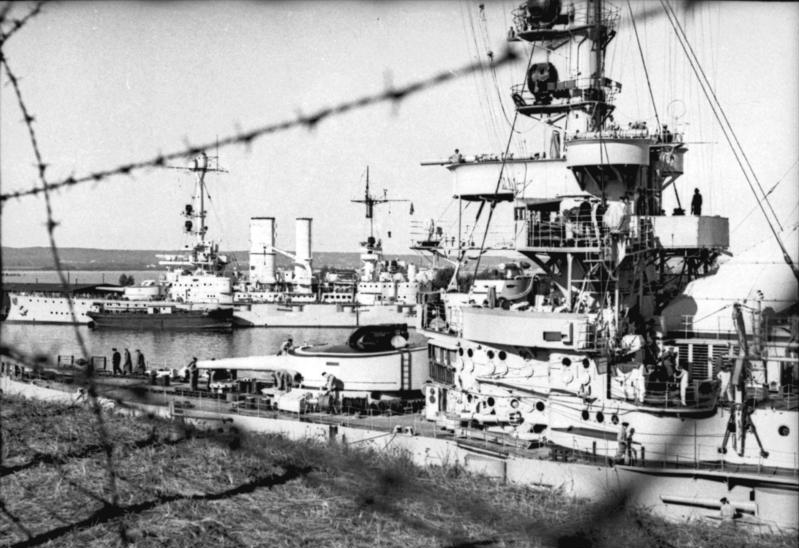
Schlesien and Schleswig-Holstein in Westerplatte after the German invasion of Poland

After World War I, most battleships, dreadnought and pre-dreadnought alike, were disarmed under the terms of the Washington Naval Treaty. Largely this meant the ships being broken up for scrap; others were destroyed in target practice or relegated to training and supply duties. One, Mikasa, was given a special exemption to the Washington Treaty and was maintained as a museum and memorial ship.

Germany, which lost most of its fleet under the terms of the Versailles treaty, was allowed to keep eight pre-dreadnoughts (of which only six could be in active service at any one time) which were counted as armoured coast-defence ships; two of these were still in use at the beginning of World War II. One of these, Schleswig-Holstein, shelled the Polish Westerplatte peninsula, opening the German invasion of Poland and firing the first shots of the Second World War. Schleswig-Holstein served for most of the war as a training ship; she was sunk by air attack while under refit in December 1944. After the war, the Soviets raised the wreck and beached it for use as a stationary target in the Gulf of Finland. The other, Schlesien, was mined and then scuttled in May 1945. She was partially scrapped between 1949 and 1970, but some sections remain.

A number of the inactive or disarmed pre-dreadnoughts were nevertheless sunk in action during World War II, such as the Greek pre-dreadnoughts Kilkis and Lemnos, bought from the U.S. Navy in 1914. While neither of the ships was in active service, they were both sunk by German dive bombers after the German invasion in 1941. In the Pacific, the U.S. Navy submarine USS Salmon sank the disarmed Japanese pre-dreadnought Asahi in May 1942. A veteran of the Battle of Tsushima, she was serving as a repair ship.

=== Post-World War II ===
No pre-dreadnoughts served post–World War II as armed ships, though a number lingered on in secondary roles for a decade or more. The last serving pre-dreadnought was the former SMS Hessen, which was used as a target ship by the Soviet Union into the early 1960s as the Tsel. The hull of the former USS Kearsarge served as a crane ship from 1920 until its scrapping in 1955. The hulk of the ex-USS Oregon was used as an ammunition barge at Guam until 1948, after which she was scrapped in 1956. The Turkish battleship Turgut Reis remained in use as a barracks ship until 1950.

== Survivors ==
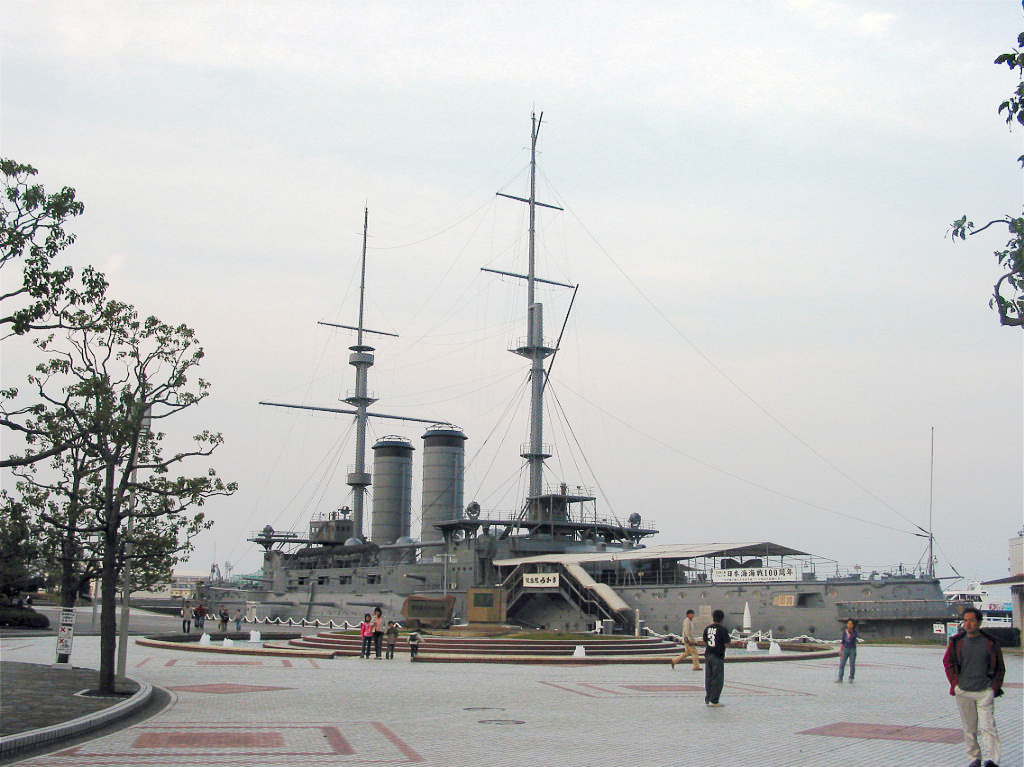
The Mikasa as a museum ship

There is only one pre-dreadnought preserved today: the Imperial Japanese Navy's flagship at the Battle of Tsushima, Mikasa, which is now located in Yokosuka, where she has been a museum ship since 1925.

== Sources ==
- Albertson, Mark (2007). U.S.S. Connecticut: Constitution State Battleship. Mustang: Tate Publishing. ISBN 978-1-59886-739-8.
- Beeler, John (2001). Birth of the Battleship: British Capital Ship Design 1870–1881. Annapolis, Maryland: Naval Institute Press. ISBN 9781557502131.
- Bennett, Geoffrey (2014) [1968]. Naval Battles of the First World War. Barnsley: Pen & Sword. ISBN 9781473816640.
- Brown, David K. (2003) [1997]. Warrior to Dreadnought: Warship Development 1860–1905. London: Caxton Editions. ISBN 9781840675290.
- Burt, R. A. (2013). British Battleships 1889–1904 (New revised ed.). Annapolis, Maryland: Naval Institute Press. ISBN 978-1-59114-065-8.
- Campbell, John (1992). "Naval Armaments and Armour". In Gardiner, Robert; Lambert, Andrew D. (eds.). Steam, Steel and Shellfire: The Steam Warship 1815–1905. Conway's History of the Ship. London: Conway Maritime Press. pp. 158–169. ISBN 9781557507747.
- Forczyk, Robert (2009). Russian Battleship vs Japanese Battleship, Yellow Sea 1904-05. Oxford: Osprey. ISBN 978-1-84603-330-8.
- Friedman, Norman (2018). British Battleships of the Victorian Era. Annapolis, Maryland: Naval Institute Press. ISBN 978-1-68247-329-0.
- Gardiner, Robert, ed. (2001) [1992]. The Eclipse of the Big Gun: The Warship 1906–45. Conway's History of the Ship. Edison, New Jersey: Chartwell Books. ISBN 9780785814146.
- Gardiner, Robert; Lambert, Andrew D., eds. (1992). Steam, Steel and Shellfire: The Steam Warship 1815–1905. Conway's History of the Ship. London: Conway Maritime Press. ISBN 9781557507747.
- Griffiths, Denis (1992). "Warship Machinery". In Gardiner, Robert; Lambert, Andrew D. (eds.). Steam, Steel and Shellfire: The Steam Warship 1815–1905. Conway's History of the Ship. London: Conway Maritime Press. pp. 170–178. ISBN 9781557507747.
- Gröner, Erich (1990). German Warships: 1815–1945. Vol. I: Major Surface Vessels. Annapolis: Naval Institute Press. ISBN 978-0-87021-790-6.
- Hill, J. Richard, Rear Admiral (2000). War at Sea in the Ironclad Age. London: Cassell. ISBN 9780304352739.
- Jentschura, Hansgeorg; Jung, Dieter & Mickel, Peter (1977). Warships of the Imperial Japanese Navy, 1869–1945. Annapolis, Maryland: United States Naval Institute. ISBN 978-0-87021-893-4.
- Jordan, John & Caresse, Philippe (2017). French Battleships of World War One. Annapolis, Maryland: Naval Institute Press. ISBN 978-1-59114-639-1.
- Kennedy, Paul M. (1983). The Rise and Fall of British Naval Mastery. London: Macmillan. ISBN 9780333350942.
- Langensiepen, Bernd & Güleryüz, Ahmet (1995). The Ottoman Steam Navy 1828–1923. London: Conway Maritime Press. ISBN 978-0-85177-610-1.
- Massie, Robert K. (2004). Dreadnought: Britain, Germany and the Coming of the Great War. London: Pimlico. ISBN 978-1-84413-528-8.
- Massie, Robert K. (2003). Castles of Steel: Britain, Germany, and the Winning of the Great War at Sea. New York: Random House. ISBN 978-0-679-45671-1.
- McLaughlin, Stephen (2001). "Predreadnoughts vs a Dreadnought: The Action off Cape Sarych, 18 November 1914". In Preston, Antony (ed.). Warship 2001–2002. London: Conway Maritime Press. pp. 117–140. ISBN 978-0-85177-901-0.
- Parkes, Oscar (1990) [1957]. British Battleships. "Warrior" 1860 to "Vanguard" 1950: A History of Design, Construction, and Armament. Annapolis, Maryland: Naval Institute Press. ISBN 9781557500755.
- Roberts, John (1992). "The Pre-Dreadnought Age". In Gardiner, Robert; Lambert, Andrew D. (eds.). Steam, Steel and Shellfire: The Steam Warship 1815–1905. Conway's History of the Ship. London: Conway Maritime Press. pp. 112–133. ISBN 9781557507747.
- Rohwer, Jürgen (2005). Chronology of the War at Sea 1939–1945: The Naval History of World War Two (Third Revised ed.). Annapolis, Maryland: Naval Institute Press. ISBN 9781591141198.
- Schultz, Willi (1992). Linienschiff Schleswig-Holstein: Flottendienst in drei Marinen [Battleship Schleswig-Holstein: Fleet Service in Three Navies] (in German). Herford: Koehlers Verlagsgesellschaft. ISBN 978-3782205023.
- Sieche, Erwin (1992). "Germany". In Gardiner, Robert; Chesneau, Roger (eds.). Conway's All the World's Fighting Ships 1922–1946. London: Conway Maritime Press. pp. 218–254. ISBN 978-0-85177-146-5.
- Sondhaus, Lawrence (2001). Naval Warfare, 1815–1914. London: Routledge. doi:10.4324/9780203132234. ISBN 9780415214780.
- Sumrall, Robert F. (2001) [1992]. "The Battleship and Battlecruiser". In Gardiner, Robert (ed.). The Eclipse of the Big Gun: The Warship 1906–45. Conway's History of the Ship. Edison, New Jersey: Chartwell Books. pp. 14–35. ISBN 9780785814146.
