= Ethel Goodenough =

British naval officer

Superintendent Angela Goodenough CBE
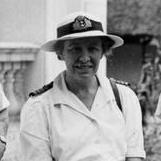
- Born: Ethel Mary Goodenough; 12 January 1900; British India
- Died: 10 February 1946 (aged 46); Colombo
- Education: private
- Known for: a leader in the WRNS

Superintendent Ethel Mary Goodenough CBE (12 January 1900 – 10 February 1946), usually known as Angela Goodenough, was a British naval officer who was the deputy director of the Women's Royal Naval Service when it was reformed in 1939.

== Early life ==
Goodenough was born in British India and baptised at Shimla. Her parents were Muriel Grace Mitford (born Ogbourne) and Captain Herbert Lane Goodenough of Setley in Hampshire. Her father served in the Indian army. Her parents arranged privately for her education and her first job was in the Admiralty. She had several relatives in the Navy and she enjoyed working in posts that were close to that branch of the forces.

By 1937 she was promoted within the Civil Service as "chief woman officer". She became responsible for the welfare of every woman who was a civil servant and for the recruitment of further temporary staff.

== Women's Royal Naval Service ==
In 1939 when war broke out the Women's Royal Naval Service that had been disbanded in 1919 was reformed. Vera Laughton Mathews was the new Director of the "WRNS" with Goodenough as deputy director, with the rank of Superintendent. On the 3 September 1939 she was in the First Sea Lord's office just after 11'o'clock when the ultimatum sent to the Germans was unanswered. The Principal Private Secretary to the Prime Minister of the United Kingdom, Eric Seal, bowed to her and said "Miss Goodenough, I have the honour to tell you that we are at war". The task of creating a WRNS fell to her and Mathews as they had no staff. There was 1,000 members of the WRNS but they all needed to be mobilised. Initially only untrained volunteer helpers were available, but 1,500 women were to be recruited. The interview panel was the WRNS director Mathews, Goodenough, the formidable Myra Curtis and "Nancy" Nettlefold who was a legally trained businesswoman who had been at university with Mathews.

Goodenough was awarded a CBE in the New Years Honours list of 1943. In 1944 she remained responsible for welfare when another deputy was appointed. She was not keen when she was asked to go to Ceylon to oversee the large number of WRNS who were serving in the Eastern Fleet. Nevertheless, she journeyed to Columbo where she was successful in her tasks.

In 1946 she became ill with polio and died after two days on 10 February. She was buried at Liveramentu Cemetery in Colombo. Her funeral was attended by 200 WRNS members and there was well attended memorial services in both London and Singapore that month. Her former boss, Mathews, retired in 1947, but the WRNS was not disbanded.
