= John Knox Laughton =

British naval historian (1830–1915)

Sir John Knox Laughton (23 April 1830 – 14 September 1915) was a British naval historian and arguably the first to delineate the importance of the subject of naval history as an independent field of study. Beginning his working life as a mathematically trained civilian instructor for the Royal Navy, he later became professor of modern history at King's College London and a co-founder of the Navy Records Society. A prolific writer of lives, he penned the biographies of more than 900 naval personalities for the Dictionary of National Biography.

== Family ==
Laughton was born in Liverpool on 23 April 1830, the second son and youngest child of a former Master Mariner, James Laughton of Liverpool (1777–1859).

In 1866, Laughton married his first wife, Isabella, daughter of John Carr of Dunfermline. They had two sons, Leonard and Arthur, and three daughters – Elsbeth, Mary and Dorothy. In 1886, Laughton married his second wife, María Josefa, daughter of Eugenio di Alberti, of Cádiz, Spain; they had three sons and two daughters, Dame Vera Laughton Mathews and Grace Laugton Bell.

Laughton died at his home at Wimbledon on 14 September 1915, aged 85.

== Academic career ==
Laughton was educated at the Royal Institution School, Liverpool, and then at Caius College, Cambridge, graduating BA (34th wrangler) in 1852. He served with the Royal Navy as a civilian shipboard instructor teaching mathematics, science and navigation, and saw combat in the Baltic and Far East campaigns. In 1866 he finished his sea days by going ashore to teach at the Royal Naval College in Portsmouth. When the college moved to the new Royal Naval College, Greenwich, in 1873, Laughton moved with it to become head of the department of meteorology and marine surveying.

In the 1870s Laughton turned more and more to teaching and lecturing on history, delivering a now famous lecture to the Royal United Services Institute (RUSI) in 1874 on the importance of actually analysing historical events, rather than merely reporting events chronologically. This was a new idea at the time and would not have been seen then as stating the obvious, as perhaps it would today. With this new approach, Laughton ‘acted as a catalyst for [the] entire intellectual development' of naval history as an independent discipline.

During his time as a lecturer in naval history, Laughton was undoubtedly an influence on the more famous naval historian-strategists of his age – Alfred Thayer Mahan, Julian Corbett and Herbert Richmond. Mahan, who has been described as "one of Laughton's disciples", wrote of him that "He probably knows more naval history than any English speaking man living". In 1885 he left the Royal Navy to accept the position of professor of modern history at King's College, London. He succeeded in persuading the Admiralty to allow limited public access to their archives. Together with Admiral Cyprian Bridge, Laughton co-founded the Navy Records Society in 1893. He was the Society's first Secretary, and was knighted for his work in 1907.

Laughton died at the age of 85 on 14 September 1915 and was buried at sea in the Thames Estuary from the decks of HMS Conqueror.

== Legacy and influence ==
Laughton's contributions to naval history were largely forgotten until the pioneering work by Canadian naval historian Donald Mackenzie Schurman The Education of a Navy: The Development of British Naval Strategic Thought, 1867–1914 (1965) resurrected his memory. Professor Andrew Lambert has since added to this with a work, The Foundations of Naval History: John Knox Laughton, the Royal Navy and the Historical Profession.

Unlike Mahan and Corbett, Laughton never wrote a major work, and the body of work that he did leave behind went out of print and until online editions became available was very difficult to come by. The measure of his significance comes by looking at the people he influenced and the institutions which he left behind after his death. Through 'long-term influence and personal contact' with other thinkers in the field and British admirals, he managed to sow the seeds in influential people's minds that naval history was a subject worth studying, something which had relevance and bearing on modern naval affairs. The Navy Records Society remains a key part of the discipline of naval history.

In recognition of his importance, King's College Department of War Studies has named its naval history chair as the "Laughton Professor", and naval historians in the department belong to the Laughton Unit.

== Honours ==
- Knight Bachelor in 1907
- Chesney Gold Medal in 1910
- Professorship, granted in 1885 by King's College London

== Works ==
- Physical Geography in Its Relation to the Prevailing Winds and Currents (London: Potter, 1873) read online
- Recollections of James Anthony Gardner [1770–1846], Commander R. N. (1775–1814), ed. by Laughton and Sir Richard Vesey Hamilton (London: Navy Records Society, 1886) read online
- Studies in Naval History: Biographies (London: Longmans, Green and Company, 1887) read online
- State Papers Relating to the Defeat of the Spanish Armada, Anno 1588 (London: Navy Records Society, 1894) read online
- Nelson (London: Macmillan, 1895) read online
- Nelson and His Companions in Arms (London: G. Allen, 1896) read online
- Journal of Rear-Admiral Bartholomew James, 1752–1828 (London: Navy Records Society, 1896) read online
- From Howard to Nelson: Twelve Sailors (London: Lawrence and Bullen, 1899) read online
- The Naval Miscellany (5 vols.) (ed., with William Gordon Perrin and Lloyd Christopher) (Navy Records Society, 1902 read online
- Sea Fights and Adventures, Described (London: G. Allen, 1907) read online
- Letters and Papers of Charles, Lord Barham, Admiral of the Red Squadron, 1758–1813 (3 vols.) (Navy Records Society, 1907–11) read online
- The Barker Collection: Manuscripts of and Relating to Admiral Lord Nelson, briefly noted by Sir John Knox Laughton (London: Chiswick Press, 1913) read online

== See also ==
- Rear-Admiral Alfred Thayer Mahan USN
- Sir Julian Corbett
- Rear-Admiral Stephen Luce USN
- Admiral Sir Herbert Richmond RN
- The Laughton Unit for Naval History Laughton Unit
