= Grace Laughton Bell =

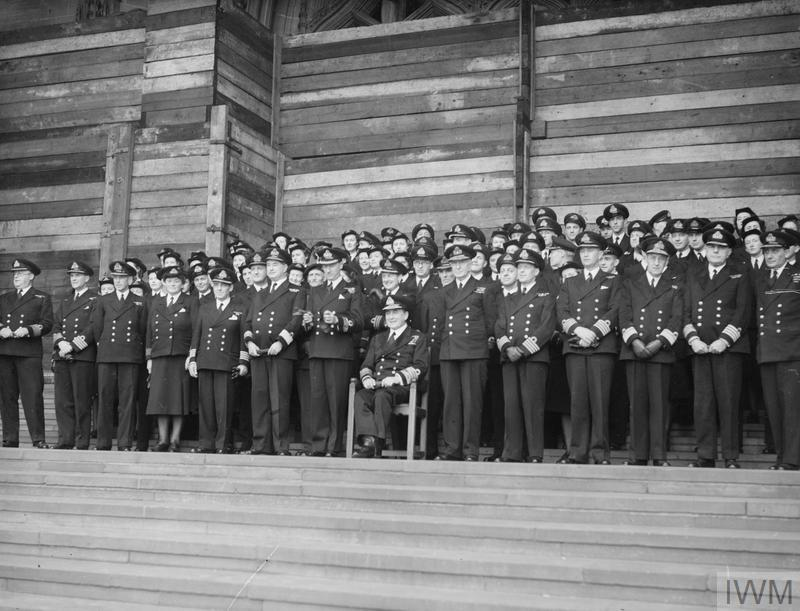
The Commander-in-Chief of Western Approaches, Admiral Sir Max K. Horton, with his naval officers. In the front row, Grace Laughton Bell.

Grace Ellen Effingham Laughton Bell CBE (née Laughton; Hammersmith, London, 28 December 1889 - Fuengirola, Spain, 10 December 1975) was an officer of the Women's Royal Naval Service during the Second World War.

== Early life and family ==
Grace Ellen Effingham Laughton was born in Hammersmith, London, on 28 December 1889.

She was the youngest daughter of the marriage between John Knox Laughton and María Josefa de Los Angeles de Alberti. She had three brothers and a sister. Her eldest sister was Dame Vera Laugton Mathews. She studied at Convent Schools, King's College, University of London.

In 1915, she married John Russel Little, who had killed in action during the First World War in 1917. In 1918, she married Harry Graham Bell (1888–1950), eldest son of Major Bell, of Chepstow, with whom she had three sons. One of their sons was Major Hubert Graham Bell, member of the Most Excellent Order of the British Empire.

== Military career ==
Between 1915 and 1919 she served in the Women's Forestry Corps as a travelling officer for Wales and the West of England. At the outbreak of the Second World War, she began working for the Women's Royal Naval Service, where she served from 1939 to 1946.

Grace and her sister Vera Laughton Mathews were among the first officers of the Women's Royal Naval Service. Vera became head of the service between 1939 and 1946. Grace reached the rank of superintendent.

== Honours and distinctions ==
Grace Laughton Bell was awarded the title of Commander of the Order of the British Empire at the end of the Second World War.

== Death ==
Died on 10 December 1975 in Fuengirola, Spain. She died after an accidental fall caused by a broken walking stick. She was buried in the English Cemetery in Málaga.
