= Karin Stephen =

British psychoanalyst and psychologist (1889–1953)

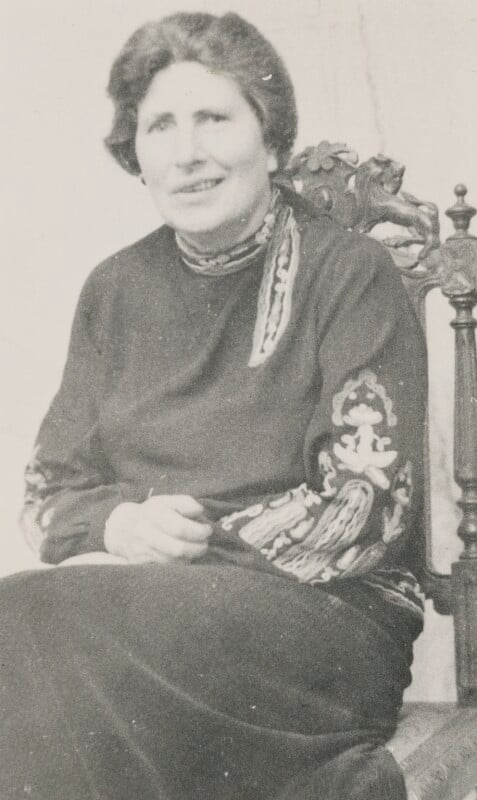
- Stephen in 1927
- Born: Catherine Elizabeth Costelloe; 10 March 1889; Westminster, London, England
- Died: 12 December 1953 (aged 64); Marylebone, London, England
- Education: Newnham College, Cambridge
- Occupations: Psychoanalyst, psychologist
- Movement: Bloomsbury Group
- Spouse: Adrian Stephen (m. 1914; died 1948)
- Children: 2
- Mother: Mary Berenson
- Relatives: Ray Strachey (sister), Christopher Strachey (nephew)

Karin Stephen (née Costelloe; 10 March 1889 – 12 December 1953) was a British psychoanalyst and psychologist.

== Early life and education ==
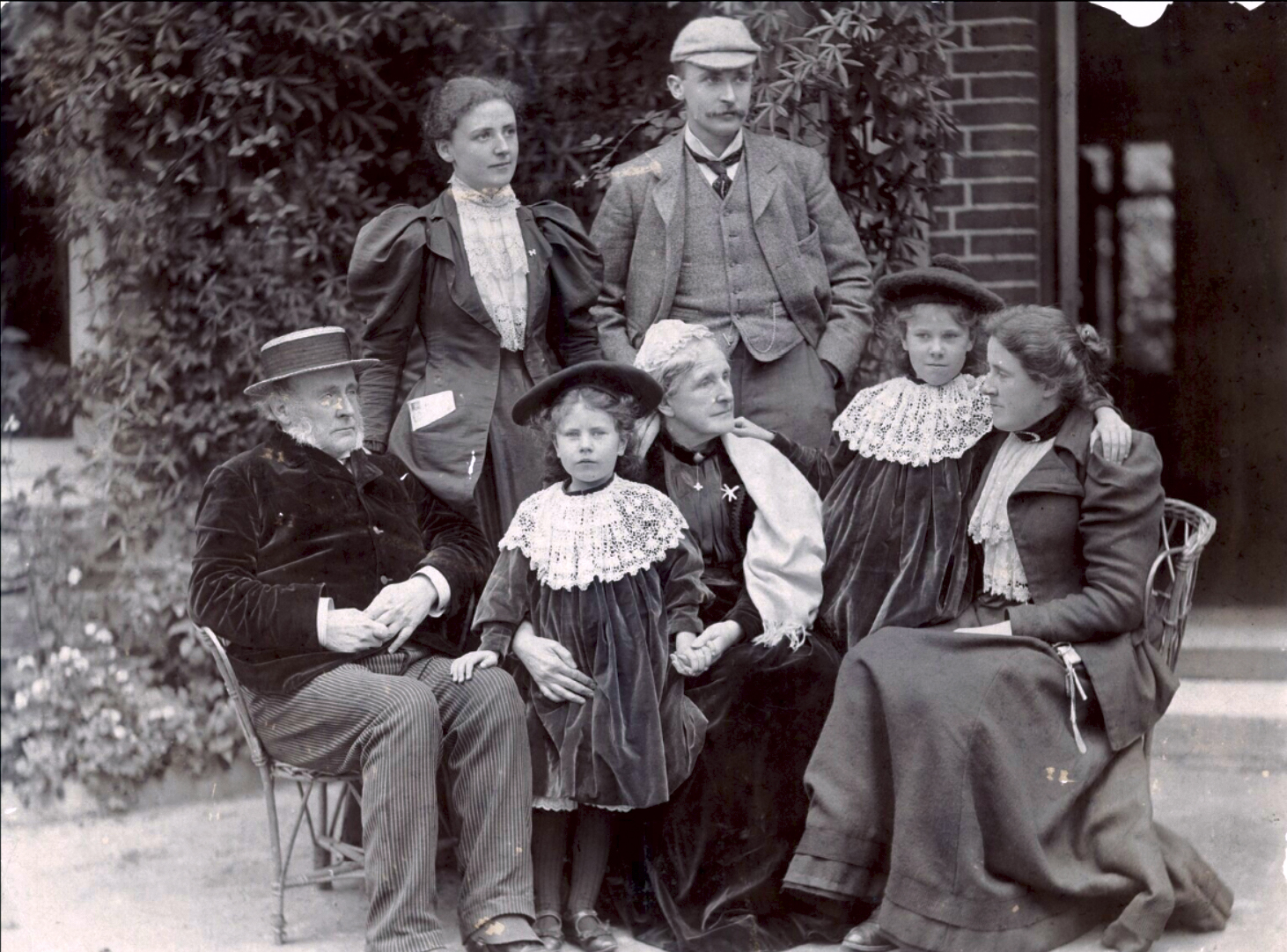
Karin Stephen, at age five, (left) with other members of the Robert Pearsall Smith family (1894)

Karin Stephen was born Catherine Elizabeth Costelloe. Her mother, Mary Costelloe (born Mary Whitall Smith) (better known as Mary Berenson; 1864–1945) had been a Philadelphia Quaker, and her father, Benjamin Francis Conn Costelloe (1855–1899) a Northern Irish convert to Roman Catholicism. The relationship between her parents was difficult, and her mother left her husband when Karin and her sister Rachel were very young. Her father died in 1899 when she was ten years old, so the sisters were then looked after by their grandmother. While at boarding school she won a scholarship for Newnham College, Cambridge.

Stephen went up to Newnham in 1907 but left after one year, due to various personal and health problems. She then spent a year at Bryn Mawr College where she began to study philosophy and psychology. In 1909 she returned to Newnham and received a First class degree in Moral Sciences in 1910. In 1914 she became a Fellow at Newnham.

== Career ==
In 1913 she and three other women started an unsuccessful legal action, known as Bebb vs. the Law Society, claiming that the Law Society should be compelled to admit them to its preliminary examinations. The three other women were Gwyneth Bebb, who the action was named after, Maud Crofts, and Lucy Nettlefold.

She married Adrian Stephen (brother of Virginia Woolf and Vanessa Bell) in 1914. They had two children, Ann Davies Stephen (1916–1997) and Judith Stephen (1918–1972) who were married respectively to biochemist Richard Laurence Millington Synge and to documentary artist and photographer Nigel Henderson. The couple, as conscientious objectors, spent the war working on a dairy farm. They became interested in the work of Sigmund Freud and after the war, the couple trained as doctors in order to practice psychoanalysis. They went into analysis with James Glover and when he died, in 1926, Karin continued with Sylvia Payne. They both qualified in 1927 and she worked in a psychiatric hospital. Accepted as an associate member of the British Psychoanalytical Society in 1927, she became a full member in 1931.

Stephen entered private practice as a psychoanalyst. She gave the first lecture course on psychoanalysis ever given at Cambridge University: the course of six lectures was repeated over several years, and formed the basis of her medical textbook Psychoanalysis and medicine. She developed deafness and had manic depression. After her husband died in 1948, her health deteriorated and she died by suicide in 1953.

Leonard Woolf considered Stephen 'Old Bloomsbury'.

Her papers are held in the archives of the British Psychoanalytical Society.

== Works ==
- The misuse of mind; a study of Bergson's attack on intellectualism, New York: Harcourt, Brace; London: K. Paul, Trench, Trubner, 1922. With a prefatory letter by Henri Bergson. In The International Library of Psychology, Philosophy and Scientific Method.
- Psychoanalysis & medicine; a study of the wish to fall ill, New York: Macmillan; Cambridge: The University Press, 1933.
- 'Introjection and Projection: Guilt and Rage', British Journal of Medical Psychology 14, pp. 316–31, 1934.
- 'A correspondence with Dr Karin Stephen', in C. H. Waddington, Science As Ethics, London: George Allen & Unwin, 1943.
- 'Relations between the Superego and the Ego', Psychoanalysis and History 2:1 (February 2000)
