= Andrew Lambert =

British naval historian (born 1956)

Andrew David Lambert
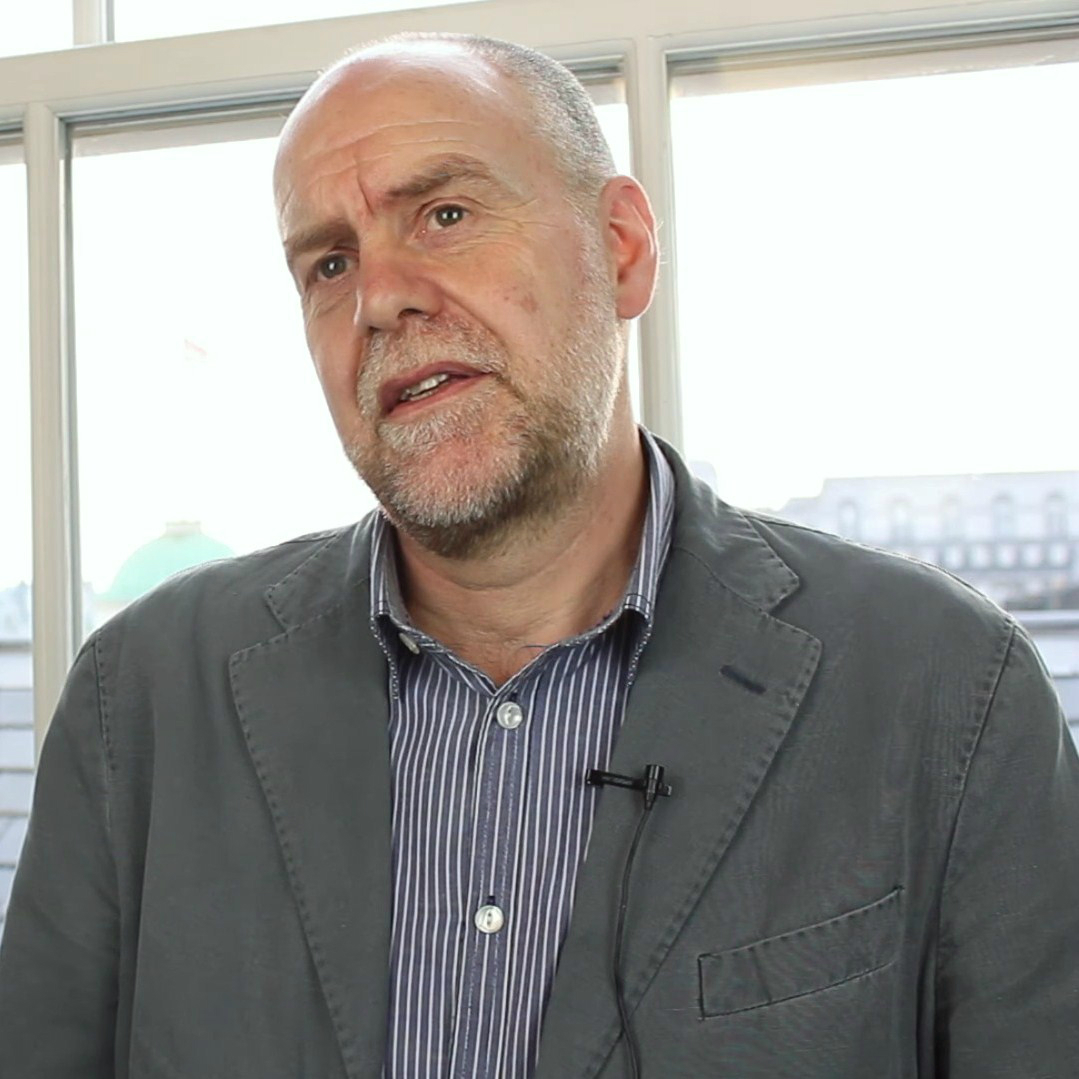
- Born: 31 December 1956 (age 69)

Academic work
- Main interests: Maritime history
- Notable works: Nelson: Britannia's God of War and other works

Andrew David Lambert FRHistS (born 31 December 1956) is a British naval historian, who since 2001 has been the Laughton Professor of Naval History in the Department of War Studies, King's College London.

== Academic career ==
After completing his doctoral research, Lambert was lecturer in modern international history at Bristol Polytechnic from 1983 until 1987; consultant in the Department of History and International Affairs at the Royal Naval College, Greenwich, from 1987 until 1989; senior lecturer in war studies at the Royal Military Academy Sandhurst, from 1989 until 1991; senior lecturer in the Department of War Studies at King's College London from 1996 until 1999, then professor of naval history, from 1999 until 2001; and then Laughton Professor of Naval History, and Director of the Laughton Unit.

He served as Honorary Secretary of the Navy Records Society from 1996 until 2005 and is a Fellow of the Royal Historical Society.

== Research ==
Lambert's work focuses on the naval and strategic history of the British Empire between the Napoleonic Wars and the First World War, and the early development of naval historical writing. His work has addressed a range of issues, including technology, policy-making, regional security, deterrence, historiography, crisis-management and conflict.

He has lectured on aspects of his work in Australia, Canada, Finland, Denmark and Russia. In addition, he wrote and presented for the BBC the television series War at Sea in 2004.

== Honours and awards ==
- On 1 May 2014 he was awarded the Anderson Medal by the Society for Nautical Research for his book The Challenge: Britain against America in the Naval War of 1812 (Faber and Faber 2012).
- In 2023, The Royal Swedish Society of Naval Sciences elected him a Corresponding Member.
- In December 2024, the United States Naval War College awarded him its Hattendorf Prize.

== Books ==
- Battleships in Transition: the Creation of the Steam Battlefleet, 1815–1860, Conway Maritime Press (1984) ISBN 978-0-85177-315-5
- Warrior: the World's First Ironclad, Then and Now, Conway Maritime Press (1987) ISBN 978-0-87021-986-3
- The Crimean War: British Grand Strategy against Russia, 1853 – 1856, Manchester University Press (1990) ISBN 978-0-7190-2978-3
- The Last Sailing Battlefleet: Maintaining Naval Mastery 1815 – 1850, Conway Maritime Press (1991) ISBN 978-0-85177-591-3
- Steam, Steel and Shellfire: the Steam Warship 1815–1906, edited by Andrew Lambert, Conway Maritime Press (1991) ISBN 978-0-85177-608-8
- The Crimean War: the War Correspondents, edited by Andrew Lambert and Stephen Badsey, Sutton Publishing (1994) ISBN 978-0-7509-00430
- The Foundations of Naval History: Sir John Laughton, the Royal Navy and the Historical Profession, Chatham Publishing (1998) ISBN 978-1-86176-086-9
- War at Sea in the Age of Sail, Weidenfeld & Nicolson (2000) ISBN 978-0-304-35246-3
- Laughton's Legacy : Naval History at King's College London Inaugural Lecture (2002)
- Trincomalee: the Last of Nelson's Frigates, Chatham Publishing (2002) ISBN 978-1-8617-61866
- Letters and Papers of Professor Sir John Knox Laughton, 1830–1915 Routledge (2002) ISBN 978-0-7546-08226
- The Naval History of Great Britain During the French Revolutionary and Napoleonic Wars by William James with a new introductions by Andrew Lambert. (2002)
- Nelson: Britannia's God of War, Faber and Faber (2004) ISBN 978-0-571-21222-4
- Portsmouth Dockyard in the Age of Nelson: Transactions of the Naval Dockyards Society Volume 1, Naval Dockyards Society (2006) ISBN 978-1-838-34022-3
- Admirals: The Naval Commanders who made Britain Great, Faber and Faber (2008) ISBN 978-0-571-23156-0
- Ship: A History in Art & Photography, Conway Publishing (2010) ISBN 978-1-84486-076-0
- Franklin: Tragic Hero of Polar Navigation, Faber and Faber (2010) ISBN 978-0-571-23161-4
- The Challenge: Britain Against America in the Naval War of 1812, Faber and Faber (2012) ISBN 978-0-571-27319-5
- Crusoe's Island: A Rich and Curious History of Pirates, Castaways and Madness, Faber and Faber (2016) ISBN 978-0-5713-30232
- Seapower States: Maritime Culture, Continental Empires and the Conflict That Made the Modern World, Yale University Press (2018) ISBN 978-0-300-23004-8
- The Crimean War: British Grand Strategy against Russia, 1853–56, Routledge (2020) ISBN 978-0-3676-69638
- Letters and Papers of Professor Sir John Knox Laughton, 1830-1915 (Navy Records Society Publications), Routledge (2021), ISBN 978-1-9114-23720
- Favourite of Fortune: Captain John Quilliam, Trafalgar Hero (with Andrew Bond and Frank Cowin), Seaforth Publishing (2021) ISBN 978-1-3990-1270-6
- The British Way of War: Julian Corbett and the Battle for a National Strategy, Yale University Press (2021) ISBN 978-0-3002-5073-2
- No More Napoleons: How Britain Managed Europe from Waterloo to World War One, Yale University Press (2025) ISBN 978-0-3002-7555-1

== Articles ==
- "Preparing for the Russian War: British Strategy; March 1853 – March 1854.", War & Society (1989) Volume 7, Issue 2 doi:10.1179/106980489790305605
- "The Naval War" in Pimlott, J.L. & Badsey, S. Eds. The Gulf War Assessed (London, 1992) ISBN 978-1-85-409146-8
- "Aland, Bomarsund and Anglo-Russian Relations 1815–1854" in Ericsson, K. & Montin, K. eds. I Vedlast Over Skiftet Och Alands Hav (Abo, 1993) ISBN 978-9-51-650187-4
- "Seapower 1939–40: Churchill and the Strategic Origins of the Battle of the Atlantic", Journal of Strategic Studies (March 1994) doi:10.1080/01402399408437541
- "Part of a Long Line of Circumvallation to Confine the Future Expansion of Russia: Great Britain and the Baltic 1809 – 1895", in Rystad, Bohme & Carlgren Eds. In Quest of Trade and Security: The Baltic in Power Politics, 1500- 1990 (Lund University, Sweden, 1994) ISBN 978-9-17-966287-5
- "The Shield of Empire (1815–1895)" in J. R. Hill. Ed. The Oxford Illustrated History of the Royal Navy (Oxford, 1995) ISBN 978-0-19-211675-8
- "The Royal Navy 1856–1914: Deterrence and the Strategy of World Power" in Neilson, K. & Errington, J. Navies and Global Defense: Theories and Strategies (London, 1996) ISBN 978-0-31-302167-1
- "Empire and Seapower: Shipbuilding by the East India Company at Bombay for the Royal Navy 1805–1850" in Les Flottes Des Compagnies des Indes 1600–1857 (Paris, 1996) ISBN 978-2-1112-8964-2
- Lambert, Andrew (1998). "Politics, Technology and Policy-Making, 1859–1865: Palmerston, Gladstone and the Management of the Ironclad Naval Race" (PDF). Northern Mariner. issue No. 3, (July 1998). 8 (3). The Canadian Nautical Research Society: 9–38. doi:10.25071/2561-5467.654.
- "Responding to the Nineteenth Century: the Royal Navy and the Introduction of the Screw Propeller", in Graham Hollister-Short (Anthology Editor) History of Technology (1999) (republished as eBook 2016) ISBN 978-1-35-001890-7
- "Admiral Sir William Cornwallis" in Le Fevre & Harding, eds., The Precursors of Nelson (London, 2000) ISBN 978-1-86-176206-1
- "Under the heel of Britannia, the Bombardment of Sweaborg 8–10 August 1855" and "The Syrian Campaign, 1814" in Capt. P. Hore RN ed. Seapower Ashore: 200 Years of Royal Navy Operations on Land (London, 2001) ISBN 978-1-86-176155-2
- "The Principal Source of Understanding: Navies and the Educational Role of the Past" in Capt. P. Hore, RN, ed., The Hudson Papers Volume 1. (London: Ministry of Defence, 2001)
- "Australia, the Trent Crisis of 1861 and the strategy of imperial defence" in Stevens, D. & Reeve, J., eds. Southern Trident: Strategy, History and the rise of Australian Naval Power (Sydney, Allen & Unwin, 2001)ISBN 978-1-86-508462-6
- "Introduction" and "The Slide into War" in Gardiner, Robert, ed. The Naval War of 1812 (London, Caxton Editions, 2001) ISBN 978-1-84-067360-9
- "General Introduction" and "Introduction Part 2" in James, William, The Naval History of Great Britain, During the French Revolutionary and Napoleonic Wars: Volume 2, 1797–1799 (London, Conway Maritime Press, 2002) ISBN 978-0-81-171005-3
- "Winning without Fighting: British Grand Strategy and its Application to the United States, 1815–65" in Lee, Bradford A. & Walling, Karl F., eds. Strategic Logic and Political Rationality (London, Frank Cass, 2003) ISBN 978-0-71-465484-3
- "Introduction" in James, William, Naval Occurrences of The War of 1812 (London, Conway Maritime Press, 2004) ISBN 978-0-85-177987-4

and numerous others.
