= Laughton Unit =

British research unit on naval history

The Laughton Unit [Laughton Naval History Unit] is a research unit which conducts research and teaching on naval history, theory and maritime strategy.

== History ==
The Laughton Naval History Unit was launched in 2001 by Professor Andrew Lambert.

The Laughton Unit educates and researches in the field of naval history, military theory and maritime strategy to support and shape the evolution of naval history as a methodology for education of civilians and military personnel. The unit enshrines permanence for the field of naval history and maritime strategy in British academic and public life. Andrew Lambert defines the unit as 'understanding the role of naval history while supporting the evolution of naval theory. We explore avenues of research that enhance the subject in breadth, depth and context. These can include national culture, sea/naval power theory, technology, state building and historiography, among others while expanding the understanding of students as well as civilian and military professionals on the role of naval history in understanding the past, and evolving thinking for the present and future, melding naval and cultural perspectives on the sea as a strategic environment in world history'.

The Laughton Unit takes its name from Sir John Knox Laughton who was a prominent British naval historian and the first to emphasise the importance of the subject as an independent field of study. Laughton began as a shipboard naval instructor and seeing action in the Baltic in 1855 and the Second China War, Laughton then moved to the Royal Naval College at Portsmouth, it was there, and later at King's College London, that he began the development of ‘scientific’ naval history, based on contemporary documents, as the means for the ‘higher education’ of naval officers in matters of strategy and tactics. He was immensely influential in the growing debate about strategy and tactics of navies and his friends and correspondents included all the major names in his field, such as naval intellectuals like John Colomb and Cyprian Bridge, of the Royal Navy and Alfred Thayer Mahan and Stephen Luce of the US Navy. Laughton is considered the founding father of naval history in which all prominent maritime strategists and naval tacticians followed from such as maritime strategist Julian Corbett.

The Unit is based at the War Studies Department of King's College London, which is part of the School of Security Studies.

The current Laughton Naval History Chair is held by Professor Andrew Lambert.

In 2017 the unit developed a collaborative relationship with the U.S. Naval War College's John B. Hattendorf Center for Maritime Historical Research which formally came into being in 2019.

== Research Areas ==
Research covers British and international perspectives on Naval history from classics to modern day including maritime strategy and naval theory.

The unit's principal output is theses of students and researchers. The unit has produced both civilian and military graduates at BA, MA and PhD level.

It also runs the King's Maritime History Seminar Series.

It hosts a series of staff and research student led research groups, projects and networks.
