= Gwyneth Bebb =

English lawyer (1889–1921)

Gwyneth Bebb OBE
- Born: Gwyneth Marjorie Bebb; 27 December 1889; Oxford, England
- Died: 9 October 1921 (aged 31); Edgbaston, England
- Education: St. Hugh's College, Oxford University
- Known for: 'Bebb v. The Law Society'

Gwyneth Marjorie Bebb, OBE (27 October 1889 – 9 October 1921) (later Mrs Thomson) was an English lawyer. She was the claimant in Bebb v. The Law Society, a test case in the opening of the legal profession to women in Britain. She was expected to be the first woman to be called to the bar in England; in the event, her early death prevented that, and Ivy Williams was the first woman to qualify as a barrister in England, in May 1922.

== Early life ==
Bebb was born in Oxford. She was the third of seven children of Llewellyn John Montford Bebb, a fellow of Brasenose College, Oxford. Her mother, Louisa Marion (née Traer), was the daughter of the obstetrician James Reeves Traer. She moved to Wales with her family after her father was appointed principal of St David's College, Lampeter in 1898.

She was educated at St Mary's School in Paddington, London (which later became St Mary's College, Lancaster Gate, before moving to Gerrards Cross) and then studied jurisprudence at St Hugh's College, Oxford, from 1908. She was the sixth woman to study law at Oxford: her predecessors included Cornelia Sorabji and Ivy Williams. She completed her studies with First-Class degree marks in 1911, but at that time women were not awarded degrees or allowed to graduate.

She became an investigating officer for the Board of Trade.

== Bebb v. The Law Society ==
In 1913, forty years after women first tried to become practicing professional lawyers, she and three other women started an unsuccessful legal action, known as Bebb vs. the Law Society, claiming that the Law Society should be compelled to admit them to its preliminary examinations. The three other women were Maud Crofts, Karin Costelloe, who became a psychoanalyst after marrying Adrian Stephen (brother of Virginia Woolf and Vanessa Bell), and Lucy Nettlefold.

Bebb became the first named party for the reported case, Bebb v. The Law Society. She was represented by Stanley Buckmaster KC and R. A. Wright, instructed by Withers, Bensons, Birkett & Davies when her test case was heard in the Chancery Division on 2 and 3 July 1913, before Mr Justice Joyce, seeking a declaration that she was a "person" within the meaning of the Solicitors Act 1843 as amended, and was therefore entitled to be admitted to the preliminary examination of the Law Society. The judge, who had previously ruled a decade before, against another woman attempting to be a solicitor, Bertha Cave, ruled in Bebb in 1914 that women were incapable of carrying out a public function in common law. The judge also stated that this disability must remain "unless and until" Parliament changed the law; in other words, that women could not be solicitors because no woman had ever been a solicitor.

She was represented by Lord Robert Cecil KC and R. A. Wright when the decision was upheld in the Court of Appeal in December 1913, heard by the Master of the Rolls Lord Cozens-Hardy, Lord Justice Swinfen Eady and Lord Justice Phillimore (included in the law reports in 1914), a key statement in the Court's view was the "long uniform and interrupted usage, which we ought … to be very loth to depart from" that only men had become solicitors, therefore women were not able to do so.

Bebb continued with political and feminist activism. The publicity from her case – the press was mostly in her favour – helped the campaign for women's admission to the legal profession in Britain, and the passage of the Sex Disqualification (Removal) Act 1919 allowed women to be lawyers.

== Later life, death and legacy ==
In the meantime, Bebb married a solicitor, Thomas Weldon Thomson, at St Mary Abbots church in Kensington, London, in April 1917. Her husband was born in 1872, the second son of Captain William Thomson of the 78th Highlanders. Her husband had several brothers, including Henry Broughton Thomson, and William Montgomery Thomson of the Seaforth Highlanders.

In August 1917, Bebb now Mrs Thomson was appointed assistant commissioner for enforcement for the Ministry of Food in its Midland Division, with work that included prosecuting black-marketeers. Bebb was made an Officer of the Order of the British Empire (OBE) in 1921.

Bebb had applied to join Lincoln's Inn as a student barrister in 1918, but she was refused. She gave birth to a daughter, Diana, on 23 December 1919. The Sex Disqualification (Removal) Act 1919 was passed into law the next day, on 24 December. She applied again to join Lincoln's Inn that month, and was admitted as a student on 27 January 1920. Bebb attended a banquet at the House of Commons on 8 March 1920 to celebrate the passing of the Act, where she proposed a toast. In August 1920, she gave up her work at the Ministry of Food in order to study for the bar examinations, and help her husband in his legal practice in Tewkesbury.

Bebb was permitted with 51 other Oxford women, to graduate in 1920, then the only woman who had obtained a First Class Degree in Law.

A second daughter, Marion, was born on 10 August 1921, but the pregnancy was affected by placenta praevia. The premature baby died on 12 August, and Bebb herself died at a nursing home in Edgbaston on 9 October 1921, shortly before her 32nd birthday. Bebb's funeral took place at Tewkesbury Abbey.

Of the four women who had contested the Bebb legal case, only Crofts succeeded in becoming recognised as a lawyer. Nettlefold left law, but went on to become the Deputy Assistant Secretary at the Ministry of Food, the highest Civil Service role held by a woman to that date. Costelloe became a psychoanalyst.

Crofts was the first woman solicitor and she became a partner in the law firm of Crofts, Ingram and Wyatt & Co.

A century after the passing of the law permitting women to be solicitors, one view is that there 'still work to be done to achieve real equality in law', others recognise 'the valuable work she [Bebb] did during her lifetime has led to nearly a century of women working in the law, bringing greater equality, diversity, and balance to the profession'.

Law Society president in 2019, Christina Blacklaws said: "The legal profession owes an enormous debt of gratitude to Gwyneth Bebb and her fellow aspiring female lawyers."
