= Vera Laughton Mathews =

British military officer and administrator

Dame Vera Laughton Mathews DBE
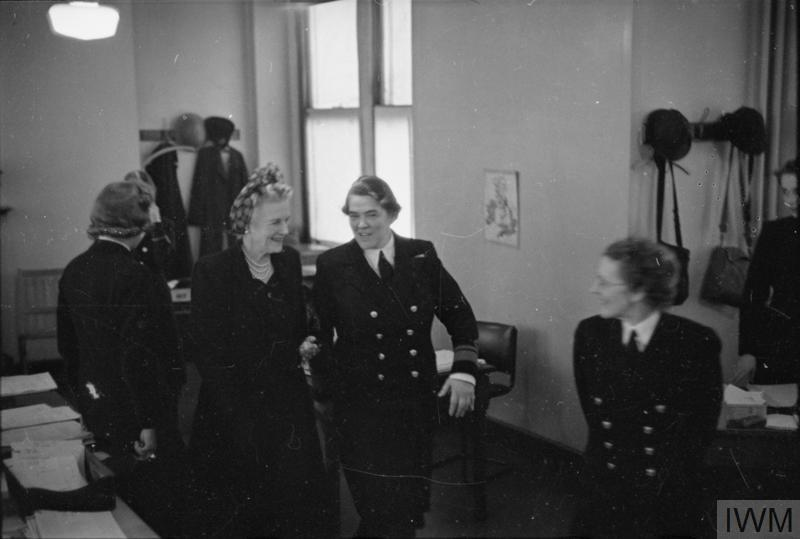
- Vera Laughton Mathews, center, alongside Clementine Churchill in 1941
- Born: Elvira Sibyl Marie Laughton; 25 September 1888; Hammersmith, London
- Died: 25 September 1959 (aged 71); Ashley Gardens, London
- Relatives: Sir John Knox Laughton (father)
- Military career
- Allegiance: United Kingdom
- Branch: Women's Royal Naval Service
- Service years: 1918–1919; 1939–1946
- Rank: Director
- Commands: Women's Royal Naval Service (1939–46)
- Conflicts: First World War; Second World War
- Awards: Commander of the Order of the British Empire (1942); Dame Commander of the Order of the British Empire (1945)

Dame Elvira Sibyl Marie Mathews, DBE (née Laughton; 25 September 1888 – 25 September 1959), known as Vera Laughton Mathews, was a British military officer and administrator. She was the second Director of the Women's Royal Naval Service (WRNS), serving from its reformation in 1939 until 1946.

== Early life and family ==
Elvira Sibyl Marie Laughton was born in Hammersmith, London, on 25 September 1888 to Sir John Knox Laughton and María Josefa de Alberti of Cadiz, Spain. She had three brothers and one sister, Grace Laughton Bell. Mathews was educated at Catholic schools: the Convent of St Andrew (in Streatham) and at Tournai (in Belgium). Later, she attended King's College London.

Vera Laughton was married to Gordon Mathews from 10 June 1924 until his death in 1943; they had two sons and one daughter.

== Military career ==
Mathews joined the Women's Royal Naval Service (WRNS) on its establishment in 1918, and was appointed to the rank of principal officer (equivalent to a Royal Navy lieutenant commander).

She was initially the Unit Officer of the WRNS Training Depot at The Crystal Palace in south London; the Depot was wound up immediately after the Armistice was signed in November 1918 as recruitment had ceased and she went on to serve in various posts on the east coast of Britain until demobilisation in 1919.

She was reappointed as the director of the reformed WRNS in 1939 with Ethel Goodenough as her deputy. Goodenough died in 1946 from polio and Mathews retired in 1947.

The Vera Laughton Mathews' Award charity was created on 21 March 1969 with the aim of supporting the education and training of the daughters of former WRNS personnel. The charity was disbanded in 2012.

== Political campaigning and journalism ==
Mathews joined the WSPU as a young woman, and in 1911 joined the Catholic Women's Suffrage Society (later the St Joan's Social and Political Alliance), and was Chair of the Alliance between 1932 and 1939.

In 1914, she was appointed acting Editor of The Suffragette magazine. She also worked on the magazine Time and Tide, which had been launched by Lady Rhondda in 1920.

== Post-war career ==
After her retirement from the WRNS, Dame Vera was asked by the post-war Labour government to sit on a number of industry committees. She chaired the Domestic Coal Consumers' Council between 1947 and 1950. She was the first woman to work in the management of the gas industry, as a member of the South-Eastern Gas Board between 1949 and 1959. She also served as an advisor on Women's Affairs to the National Gas Council. In 1958, she was appointed President of the British Federation of Business and Professional Women.

== Affiliations ==
- Girl Guide Commissioner
- Skipper of Sea Rangers
- Chairman, St. Joan's Social and Political Alliance (1932–1939)
- Chairman, Domestic Coal Consumers' Council (1947–1950)
- President, National Smoke Abatement Society (1949–1951)
- Member of the South-Eastern Gas Board (SEGAS) (1949–1959)
- Adviser on Women's Affairs to the Gas Council
- Life President, Association of Wrens
- President, St. Joan's International Social and Political Alliance
- Chair of the Status of Women Committee, St. Joan's Social and Political Alliance
- President, Mermaid Swimming Club
- Member, Council Girl Guides Association
- President, British Federation of Business and Professional Women

== Autobiography ==
Blue Tapestry, published by Hollis & Carter in London, 1948
