= Llewellyn Bebb =

British academic (1862–1915)

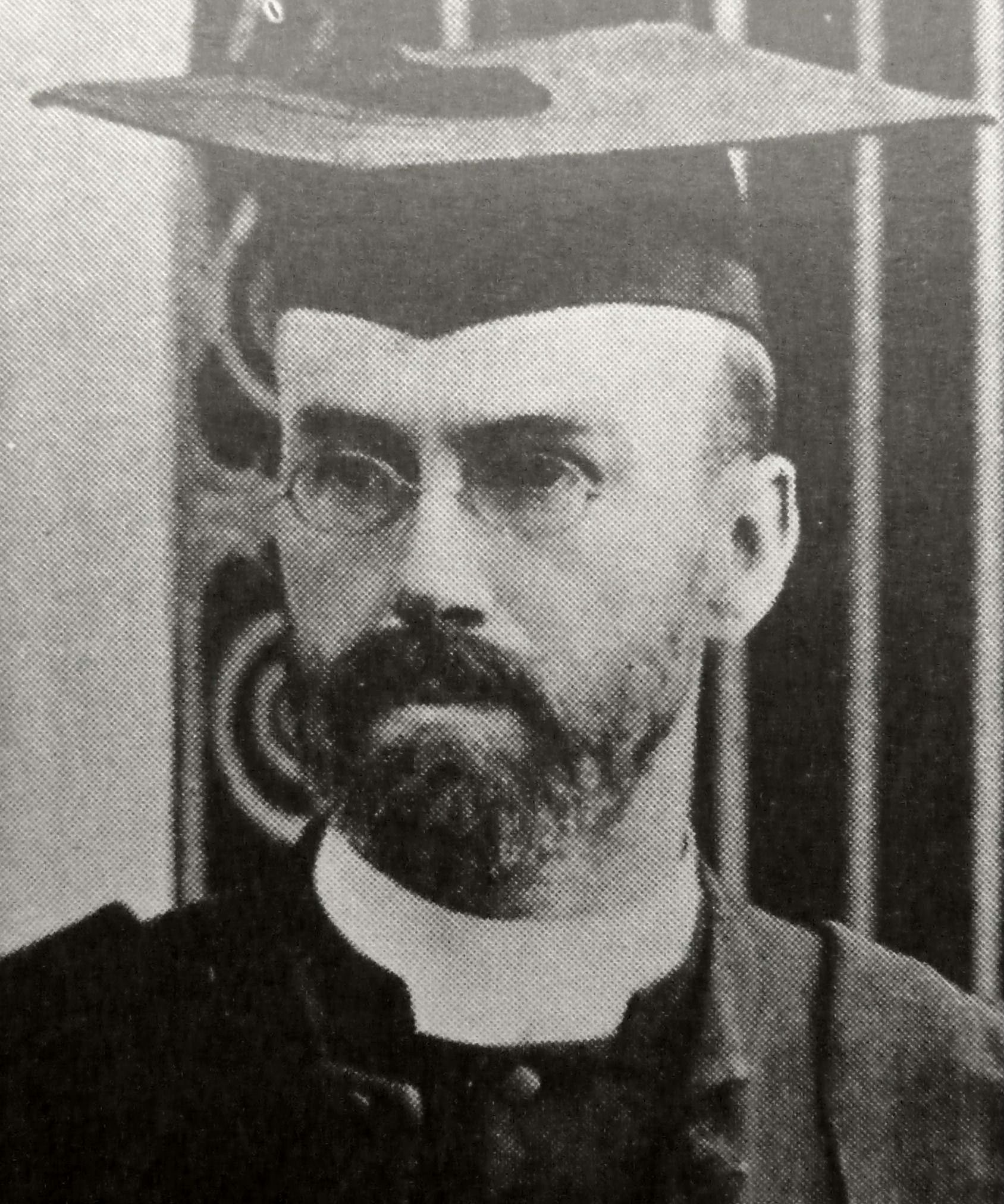
Llewllyn Bebb

Llewellyn John Montfort (or Montford) Bebb (16 February 1862 – 22 November 1915) was a British academic.

== Life ==
Bebb was born in Cape Town, Cape Colony, the son of a clergyman, Revd. William Bebb, and educated at Winchester College.

in 1885 he gained his BA from New College, Oxford, taking a double first. He was ordained deacon in 1886 and priest in 1887. He became a fellow of Brasenose College, Oxford on graduation, a position he maintained until 1898. Whilst at Brasenose, Bebb was successively tutor (1889–98), and librarian (1892–98). In 1892, he became Vice-Principal of Brasenose, until 1898, when he was appointed principal of St David's College, Lampeter. He held this final position until his death in 1915. He was known as an able administrator, a conscientious teacher and a keen sportsman. At Lampeter, he worked hard to raise funds for the college He was a member of Cardiganshire County Council, a founder member of the Cardiganshire Antiquarian Society and a canon of St David's Cathedral. Academically, his most valuable publications were articles in Hastings' Dictionary of the Bible.

He was examining chaplain to the Bishop of Salisbury from 1893 to 1898, and to the Bishop of St Asaph from 1898 to 1902, and was also curator of the botanical garden, Oxford, between 1896 and 1898. He married Louisa Marion Traer, daughter of the surgeon James Reeves Traer, in 1886; they had four sons and three daughters including Gwyneth Bebb who campaigned to be a lawyer.

== Sources ==
- Welsh Biography Online

Academic offices
| Preceded by George William Gent | Principal of St David's College; 1898–1915 | Succeeded by Gilbert Cunningham Joyce |
