= Naval Dockyards Society =

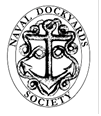
This is the logo of the Naval Dockyards Society

The Naval Dockyards Society was inaugurated in 1996 and officially constituted in 1997 at the National Maritime Museum, Greenwich. The Society’s primary aim is to stimulate the production and exchange of information and research into naval dockyards and associated organisations. It runs annual themed conferences, publishes conference papers in annual Transactions; conducts annual tours to the UK and overseas sites and has carried out campaigns to conserve dockyard sites at Sheerness, Deptford, Devonport, Gibraltar and Bermuda.

The Naval Dockyards Society is an international organisation which is concerned with and publishes material on naval dockyards and associated activities, including victualling, medicine, ordnance, shipbuilding, shipbreaking, coastguard stations, provisions and supplies; all aspects of their construction, history, archaeology, conservation, workforce, surrounding communities and family history; and all aspects of their buildings, structures and monuments relating to naval history. The Society is therefore involved closely in the terrestrial and underwater heritage of all these sites.

The NDS has links with many other societies interested in maritime history such as the Navy Records Society; The Society for Nautical Research; South West Maritime History Society; The Nelson Society; The 1805 Club; Newcomen Society; The Nautical Archaeology Society and The Royal Geographical Society. The Society is supported by The National Maritime Museum in Greenwich.

You can read about its history in J D Davies (2012) ‘The Naval Dockyards Society: the first fifteen years‘ in Defence Sites: Heritage and Future C Clark and C A Brebbia (eds) Transactions on the Built Environment Wessex Institute of Technology Volume 123 pp. 3-14 www.witpress.com ISSN 1743-3509
