= Matthew Ingle Joyce =

The Right Honourable Sir Matthew Joyce
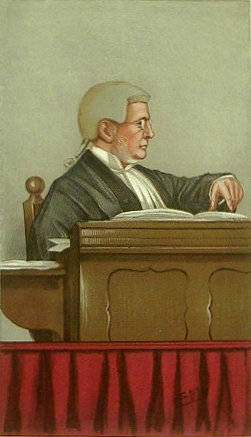

Justice of the High Court
- In office 31 October 1900 – 16 November 1915
- Succeeded by: Sir Arthur Peterson

Personal details
- Born: 17 July 1839 Breedon on the Hill, Leicestershire
- Died: 10 March 1930 (aged 90) Liverpool
- Spouse: Miriam Bertha Jackson (m. 1891)
- Children: 1
- Education: Gonville and Caius College, Cambridge

Coat of arms of Matthew Ingle Joyce

Motto
Nec Temere Nec Timide

Sir Matthew Ingle Joyce, PC (17 July 1839 – 10 March 1930) was a British judge. He was a Justice of the Chancery Division of the High Court between 1900 and 1915.

Born in Breedon on the Hill, Leicestershire, he was educated at Ashby-de-la-Zouch Grammar School and Gonville and Caius College, Cambridge, where he graduated eighth wrangler in 1862. The same year he was elected to a fellowship at Caius, which he held until 1875.

He was called to the bar by Lincoln's Inn in 1865. At the bar his pupils included the future Lord Parker of Waddington and Lord Russell of Killowen.

He was junior equity counsel to the Treasury from 1886 to 1900, when he was appointed a Justice of the High Court, assigned to the Chancery Division, and received the customary knighthood. He retired in 1915, and was sworn of the Privy Council.

Joyce married Miriam Bertha Jackson, daughter of Sir William Jackson, 1st Baronet, in 1891; they had one daughter.

== Notable cases ==
- Colls v Home and Colonial Stores
