= Portrait of George Cockburn =

Portrait of George Cockburn may refer to:

- Portrait of George Cockburn (Halls), a painting of 1817 by John James Halls
- Portrait of George Cockburn (Beechey), a painting of 1820 by William Beechey
