= National Maritime Museum =

Museum in London, United Kingdom

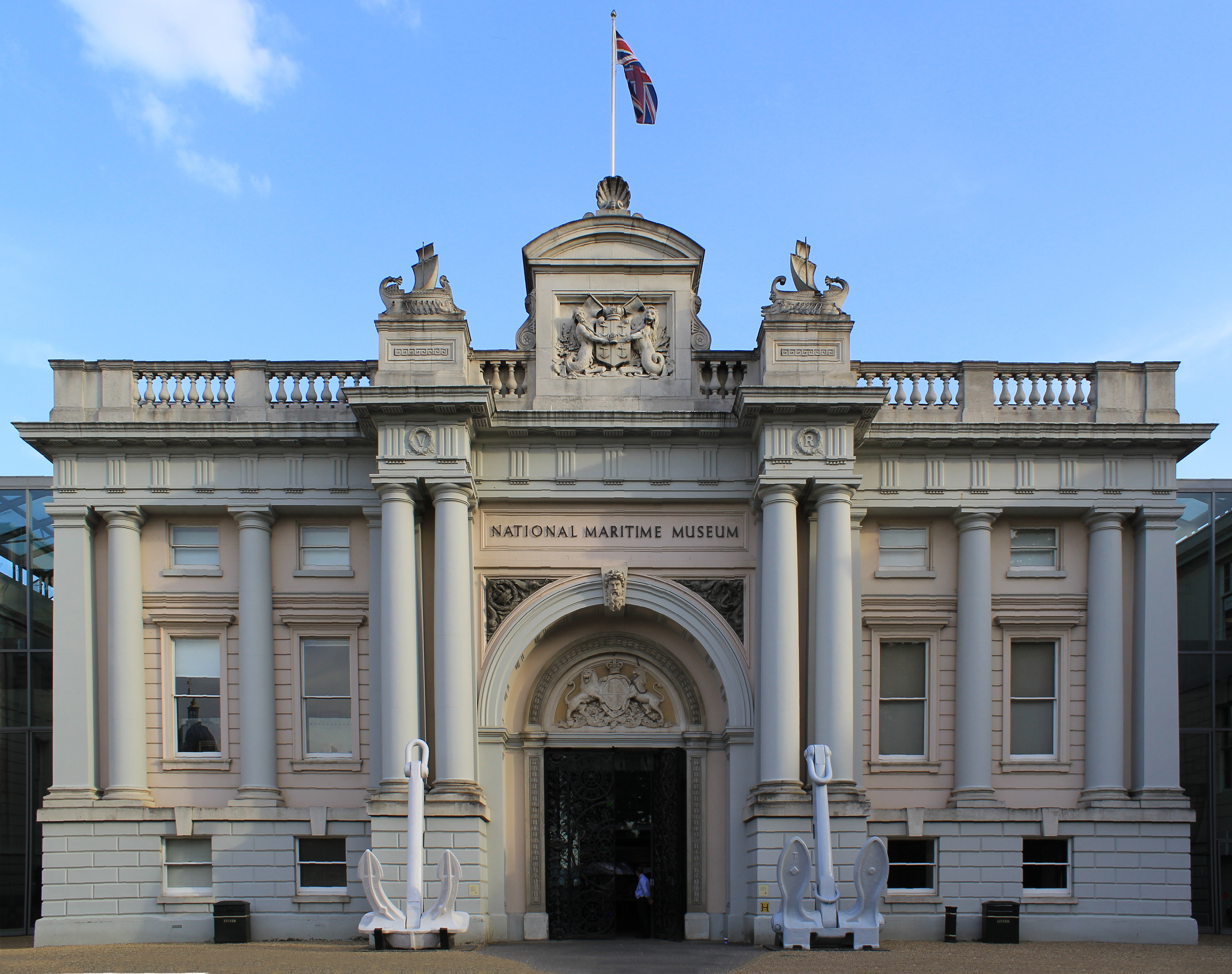
- The museum's main entrance

- Location within Royal Borough of Greenwich
- Established: 1937; 89 years ago
- Location: Greenwich; London, SE10; United Kingdom
- Coordinates: 51°28′52″N 0°00′20″W
- Collection size: 2 million+ objects
- Visitors: 2,367,904 (2009): Ranked 12th nationally
- Director: Paddy Rogers
- Public transit access: Cutty Sark; Greenwich
- Website: rmg.co.uk
- Area: 200 acres (0.81 km^{2})

The National Maritime Museum (NMM) is a maritime museum in Greenwich, London. It is part of Royal Museums Greenwich, a network of museums in the Maritime Greenwich World Heritage Site. Like other publicly funded national museums in the United Kingdom, it has no general admission charge; there are admission charges for most side-gallery temporary exhibitions, usually supplemented by many loaned works from other museums.

== Creation and official opening ==
The museum was created by the National Maritime Museum Act 1934 under a Board of Trustees, appointed by HM Treasury. It is based on the generous donations of Sir James Caird (1864–1954). King George VI formally opened the museum on 27 April 1937 when his daughter Princess Elizabeth accompanied him for the journey along the Thames from London. The first director was Sir Geoffrey Callender.

== Collection ==
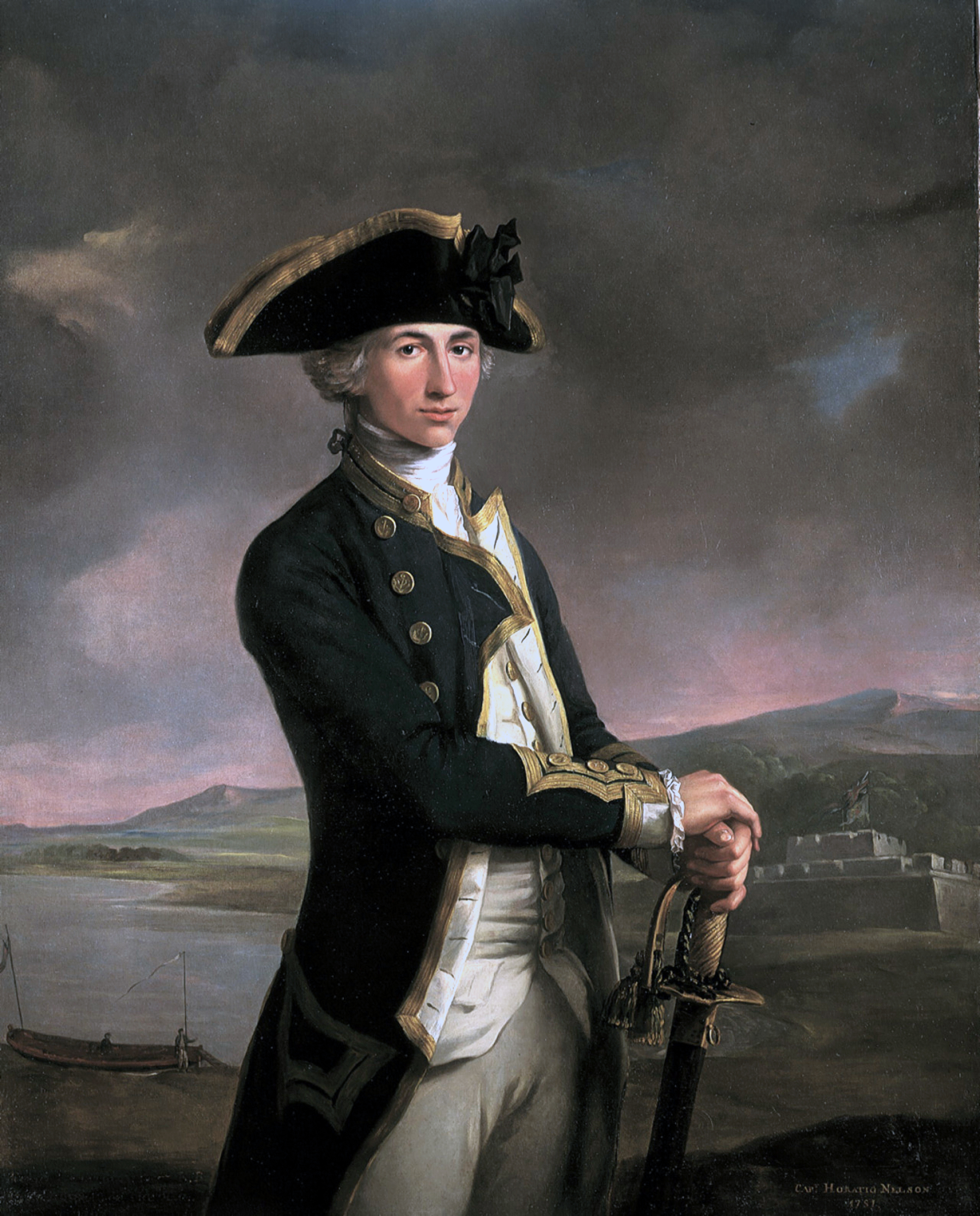
Captain Horatio Nelson by John Francis Rigaud, with Fort San Juan—the site of his most notable early achievement—in the background (Sugden, Nelson: A Dream of Glory, p. 464).

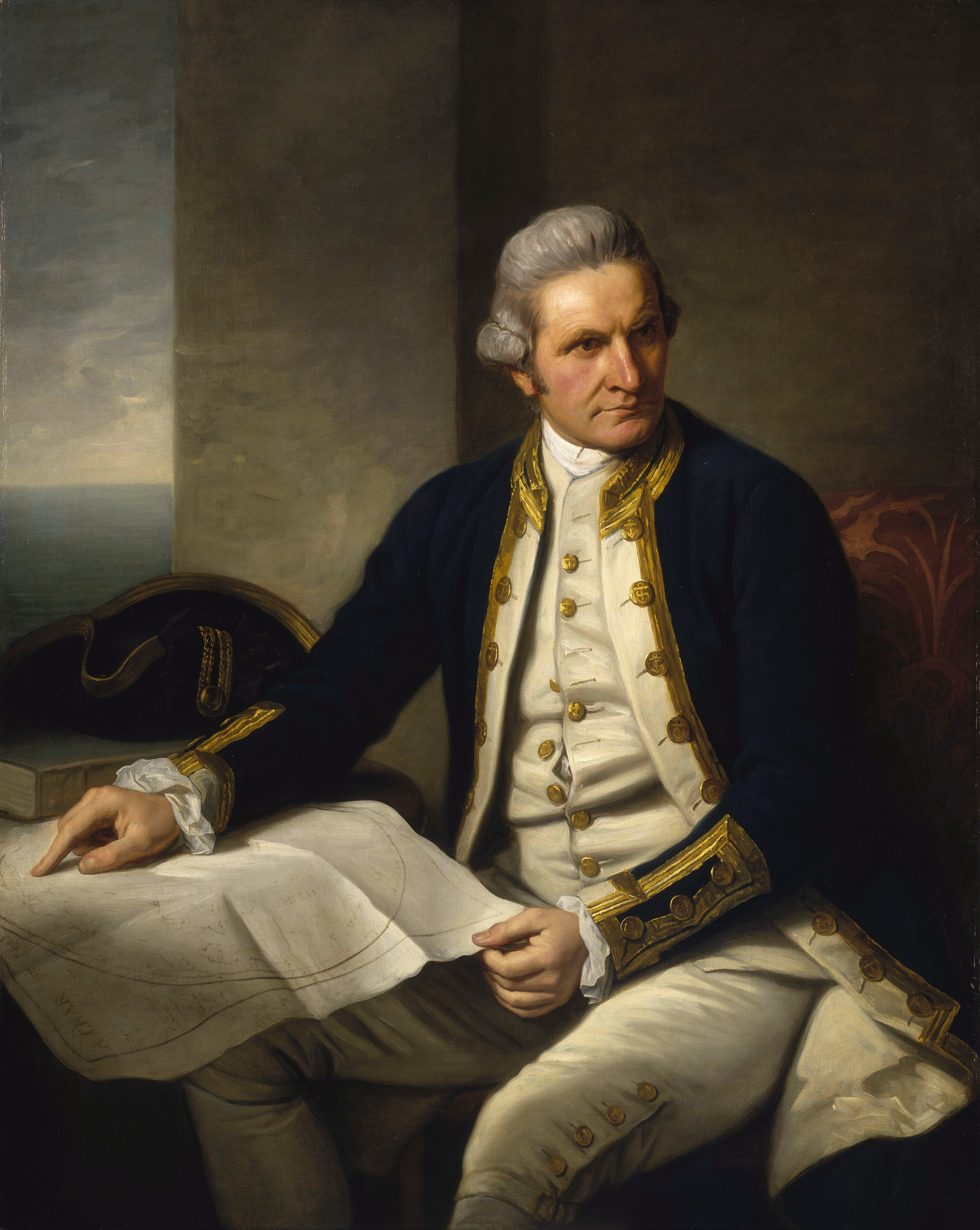
Portrait of Captain James Cook by Nathaniel Dance at the National Maritime Museum

Since the earliest times Greenwich has had associations with the sea and navigation. It was a landing place for the Romans, Henry VIII lived here, the Royal Navy has roots on the waterfront, and Charles II founded the Royal Observatory in 1675 for "finding the longitude of places". The home of Greenwich Mean Time and the Prime Meridian since 1884, Greenwich has long been a centre for astronomical study, while navigators across the world have set their clocks according to its time of day. The museum has the most important holdings in the world on the history of Britain at sea, comprising more than two million items, including maritime art (both British and 17th-century Dutch), cartography, manuscripts including official public records, ship models and plans, scientific and navigational instruments, and instruments for time-keeping and astronomy (based at the Observatory). Its holdings including paintings relating to Vice-Admiral Horatio Nelson and Captain James Cook.

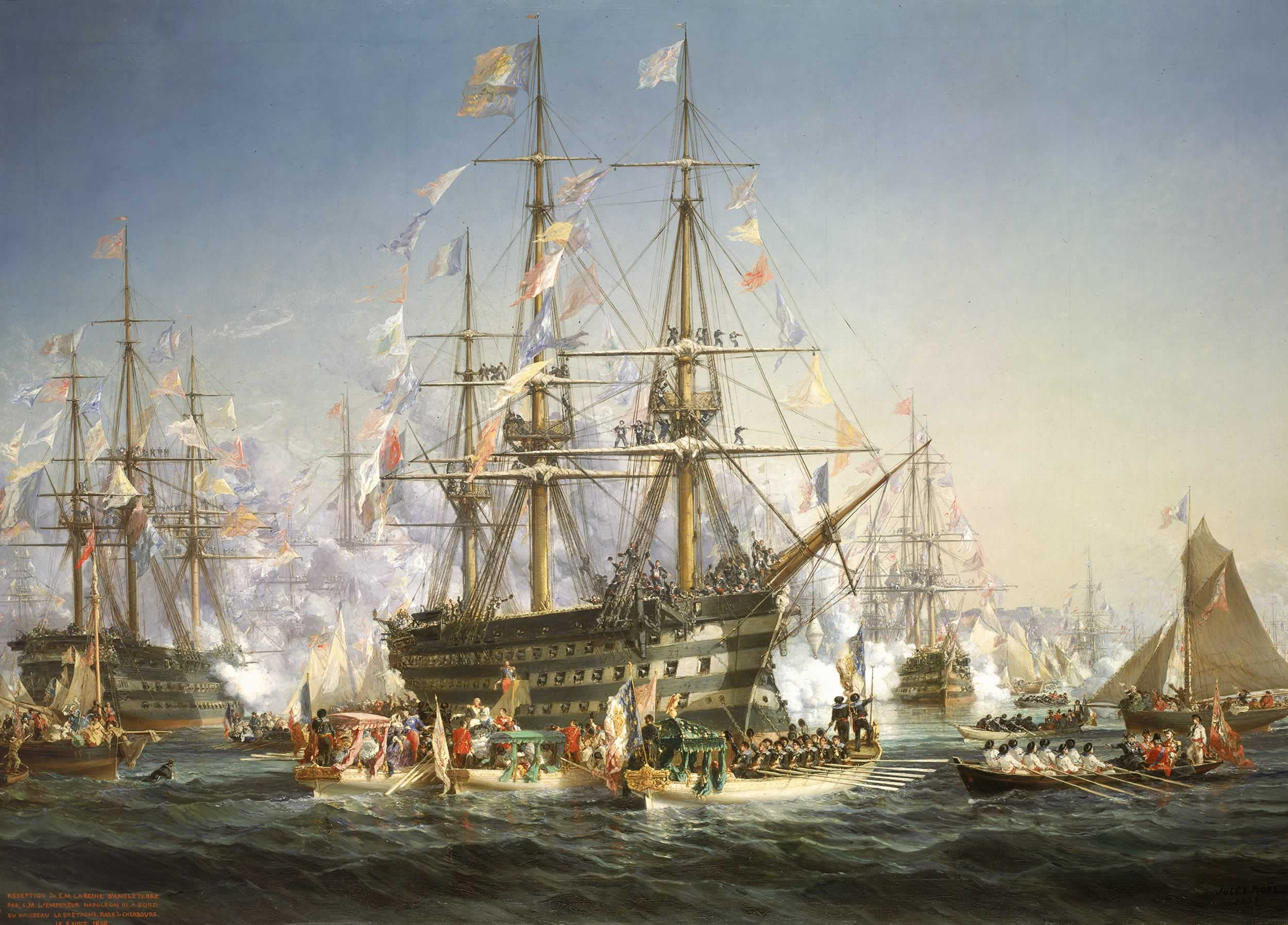
The Bretagne, painting by Jules Achille Noël, 1859, at the National Maritime Museum

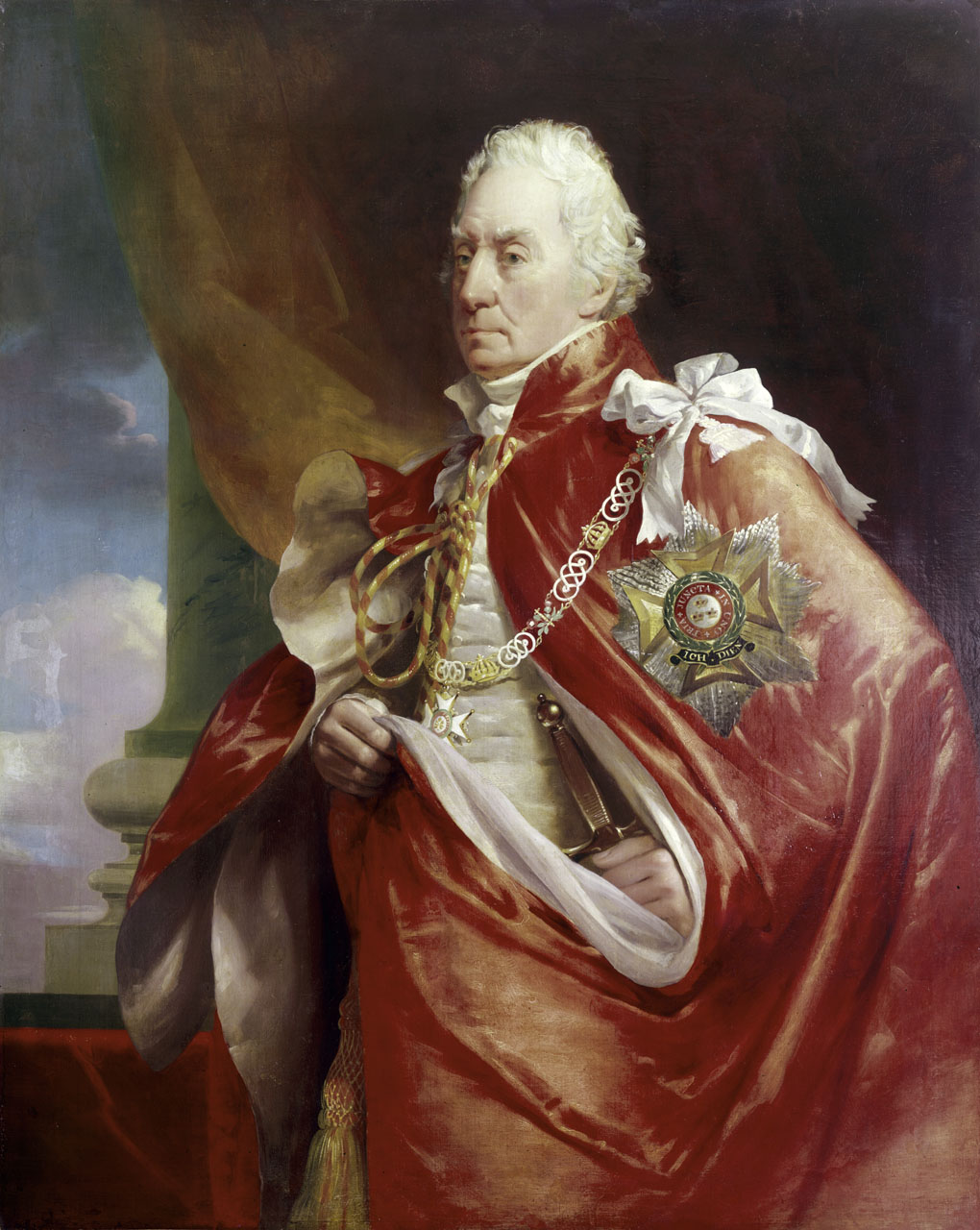
Admiral George Keith Elphinstone, 1st Viscount Keith by George Sanders

An active loans programme ensures that items from the collection are seen in the UK and abroad.

The museum aims to achieve a greater understanding of British economic, cultural, social, political and maritime history and its consequences in the world today. The museum plays host to various exhibitions, including Ships Clocks & Stars in 2014, Samuel Pepys: Plague, Fire, Revolution in 2015 and Emma Hamilton: Seduction and Celebrity in 2016.

The collection of the National Maritime Museum also includes items taken from the German Naval Academy Mürwik after World War II, including several ship models, paintings and flags. The museum has been criticised for possessing what has been described as "looted art". The museum regards these cultural objects as "war trophies", removed under the provisions of the Potsdam Conference.

The museum awards the Caird Medal annually in honour of its major donor, Sir James Caird.

In late August 2018, several groups were vying for the right to purchase the 5,500 RMS Titanic relics that were an asset of the bankrupt Premier Exhibitions. Eventually, the National Maritime Museum, Titanic Belfast and Titanic Foundation Limited, as well as National Museums Northern Ireland, joined together as a consortium that was raising money to purchase the 5,500 artifacts. The group intended to keep all of the items together as a single exhibit. The oceanographer Robert Ballard said that he favoured this bid as it would ensure that the memorabilia would be permanently displayed in Belfast (where the Titanic was built) and in Greenwich. The museums were critical of the bid process set by the Bankruptcy Court in Jacksonville, Florida. The minimum bid for the auction on 11 October 2018 was set at US$21.5 million (£16.5m) and the consortium did not have enough funding to meet that amount.

== Greenwich site ==
The museum was officially established in 1934 within the 200 acres (0.81 km^{2}) of Greenwich Park in the buildings formerly occupied by the Royal Hospital School, before it moved to Holbrook in Suffolk.

The gardens immediately to the north of the museum were reinstated in the late 1870s following construction of the cut-and-cover tunnel between Greenwich and Maze Hill stations. The tunnel comprised part of the final section of the London and Greenwich Railway and opened in 1878.

A full redevelopment of the main galleries, centring on what was called Neptune Court, which was designed by Rick Mather Architects and funded by the Heritage Lottery Fund, was completed in 1999.

In 2008, the museum announced that the Israeli shipping magnate Sammy Ofer had donated £20m for a new gallery.

Between 2016 and 2017 the National Maritime Museum reported 2.41 million visitors.

A major refurbishment of the main galleries, including replacement of the Neptune Court roof, was undertaken in the early 2020s. These works were completed in 2025, and the gallery was formally renamed the Ocean Court.

== Prince Philip Maritime Collections Centre ==
The museum has an additional site nearby, the Prince Philip Maritime Collections Centre in Kidbrooke, opened in 2018. This houses approximately 70,000 items from the collection, but is only open to the public on limited occasions, by means of (pre-booked) guided tours.

== Directors of the National Maritime Museum ==
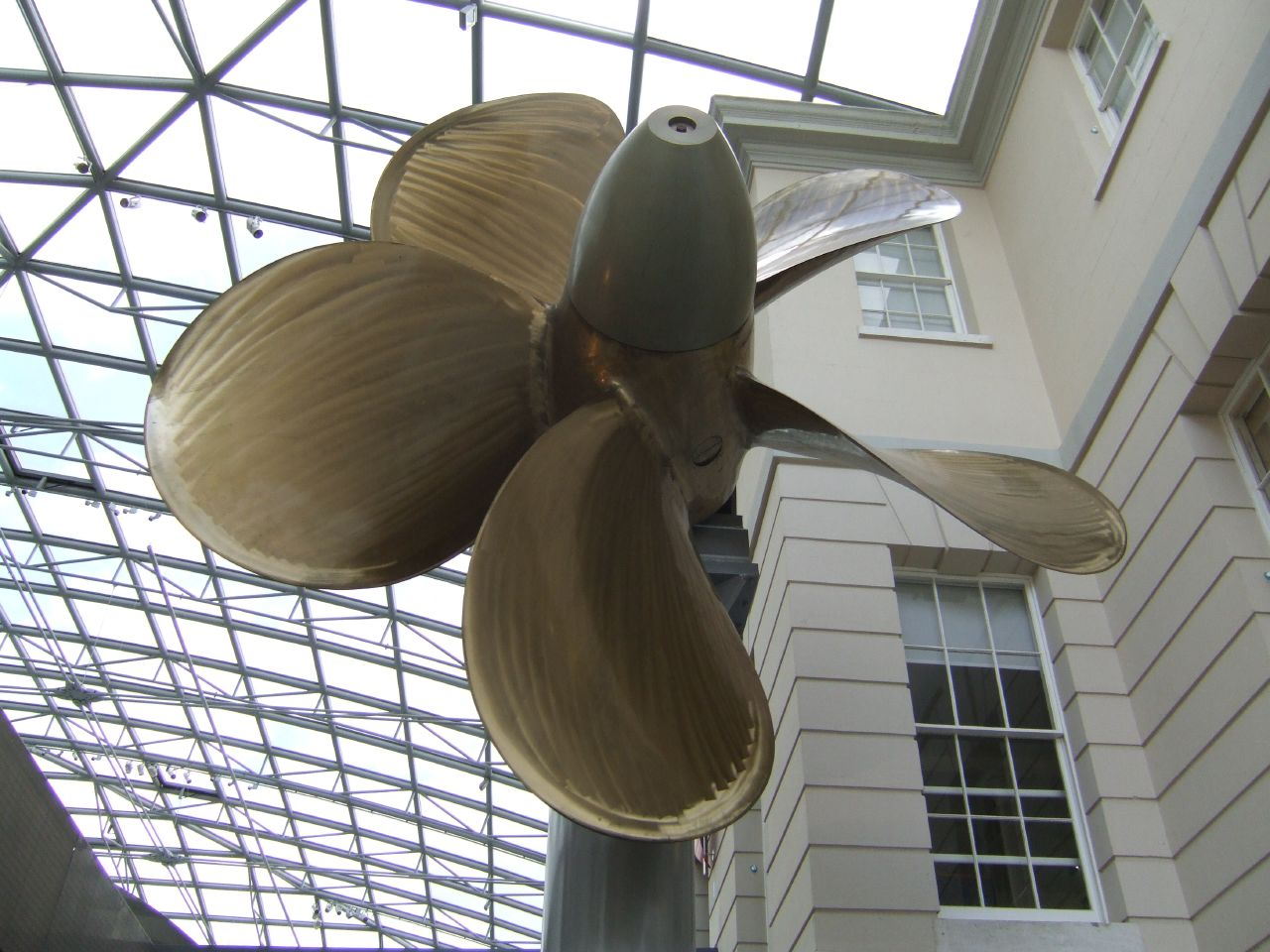
A Type 23 frigate propeller at the National Maritime Museum

- 1937–1946: Geoffrey Callender
- 1947–1966: Frank George Griffith Carr
- 1967–1983: Basil Greenhill
- 1983–1986: Neil Cossons
- 1986–2000: Richard Louis Ormond (born 1939)
- 2000–2007: Rear Admiral Roy Clare (born 1950)
- 2007–2019: Dr Kevin Fewster
- 2019–present: Paddy Rogers

== Caird Medal ==
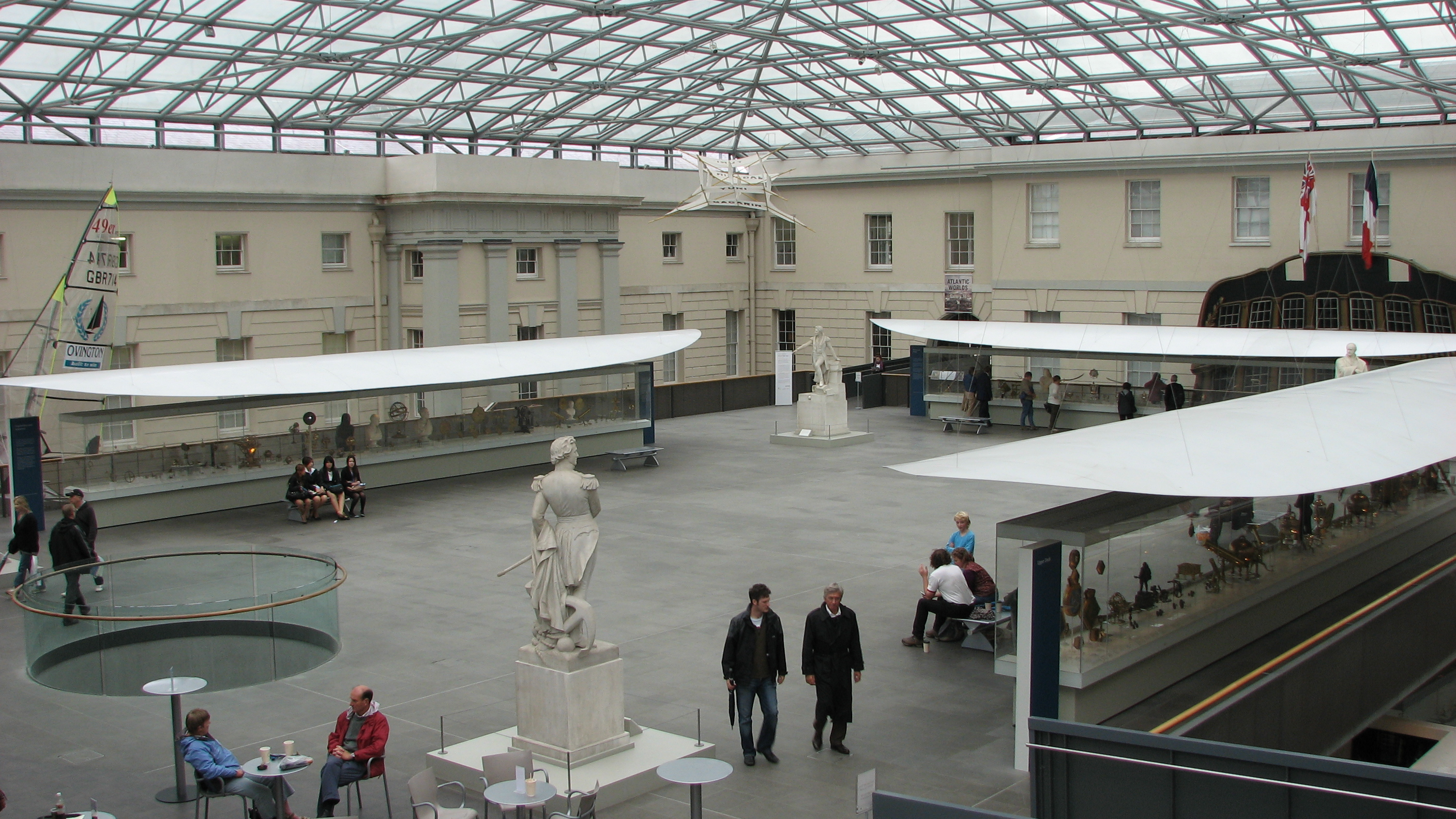
Museum interior

The Caird Medal was instituted in 1984 to mark the fiftieth anniversary of the National Maritime Museum Act 1934 that established the museum. The medal is awarded annually to "an individual who, in the opinion of the Trustees of the National Maritime Museum, has done conspicuously important work in the field of the Museum's interests and is of a nature which involves communicating with the public." The medal is named for Sir James Caird (1864–1954), the principal donor at the founding of the National Maritime Museum.

=== Caird Medallists ===
- 1984: Eric McKee
- 1985: Michael S. Robinson
- 1987: Jules van Beylen
- 1989: C. R. Boxer
- 1990: Helen Wallis
- 1991: John F. Coates and John Sinclair Morrison
- 1992: Richard Ollard
- 1993: Gerard L. E. Turner
- 1994: Glyndwr Williams
- 1995: Margaret Rule
- 1996: John de Courcy Ireland
- 1997: Felipe Fernández-Armesto
- 1998: Elly Dekker
- 1999: Elisabeth Mann-Borgese
- 2000: John Hattendorf
- 2002: Robert Ballard
- 2004: Sir David Attenborough
- 2005: Paul Kennedy
- 2006: David Armitage
- 2007: Martin Rees, Baron Rees of Ludlow
- 2010: Willem F. J. Mörzer Bruyns
- 2011: Daniel A. Baugh
- 2014: R. J. B. Knight
- 2015: Simon Schaffer
- 2024: N.A.M. Rodger

== Other British maritime museums ==
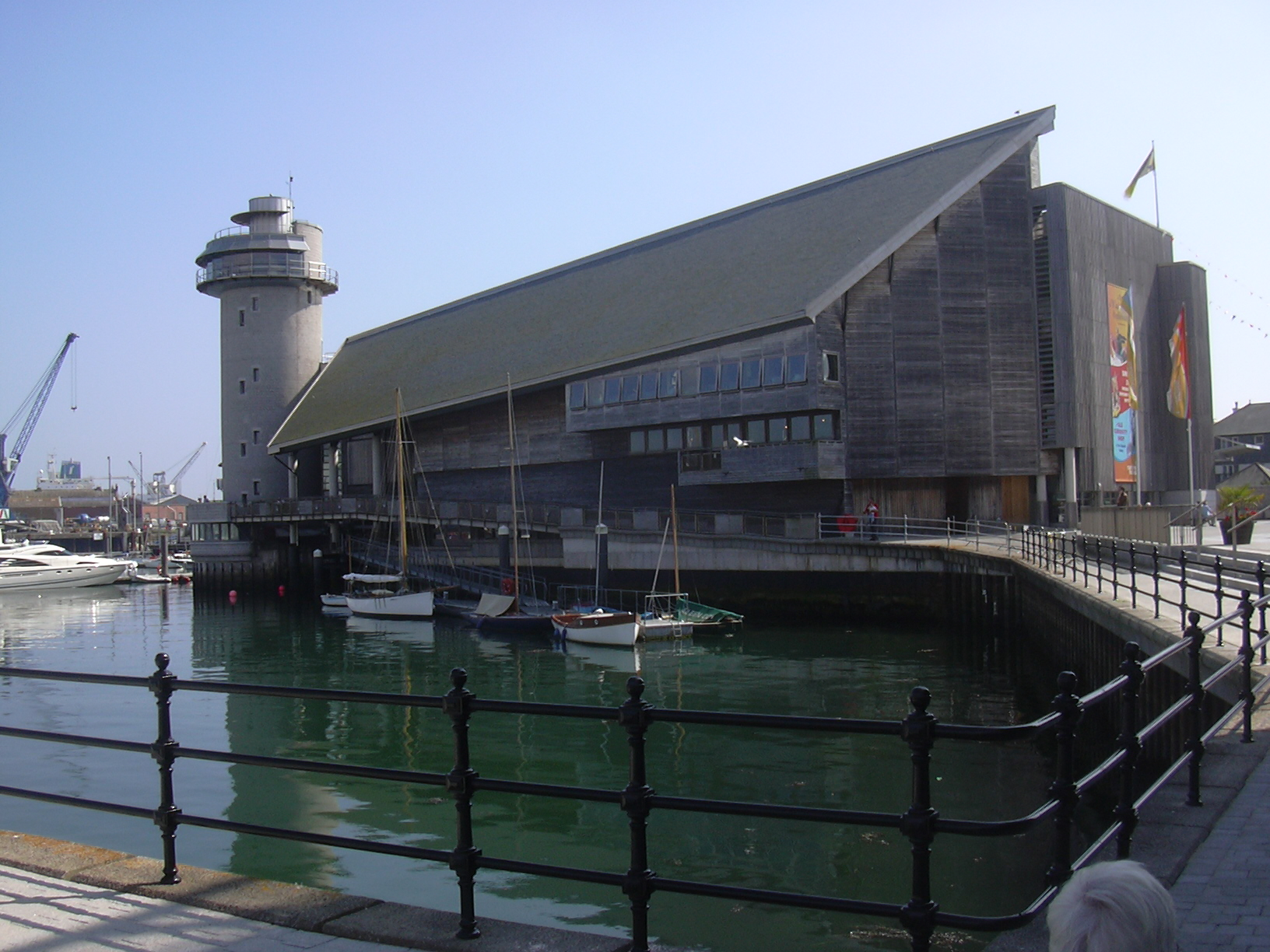
NMM Cornwall, Falmouth

The National Maritime Museum Cornwall is a fully independent museum, a development of the original FIMI (Falmouth International Maritime Initiative) partnership created in 1992 and the result of collaboration between the National Maritime Museum, Greenwich and the former Cornwall Maritime Museum in Falmouth.

== Gallery ==
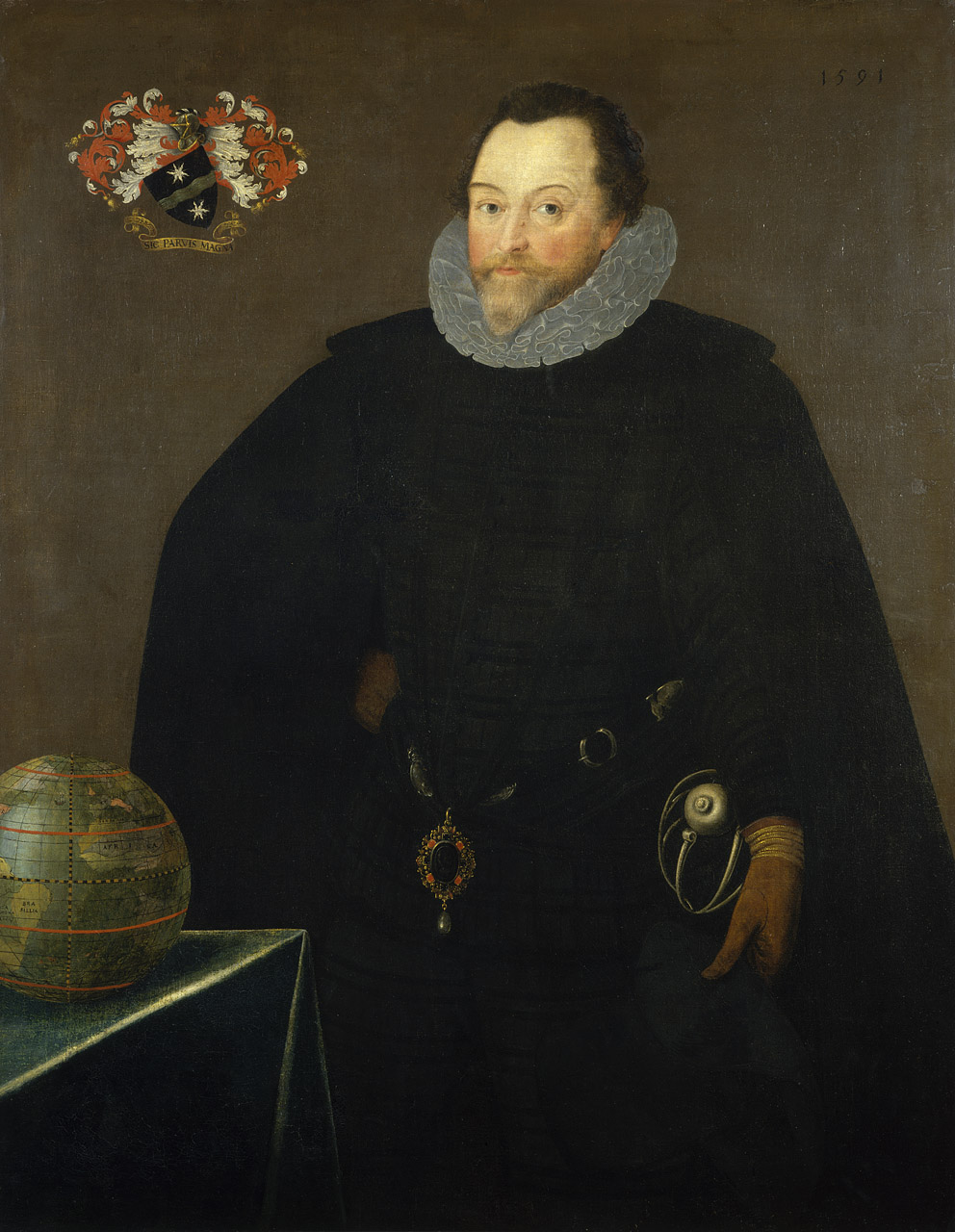
Sir Francis Drake by Marcus Gheeraerts the Younger, 1591

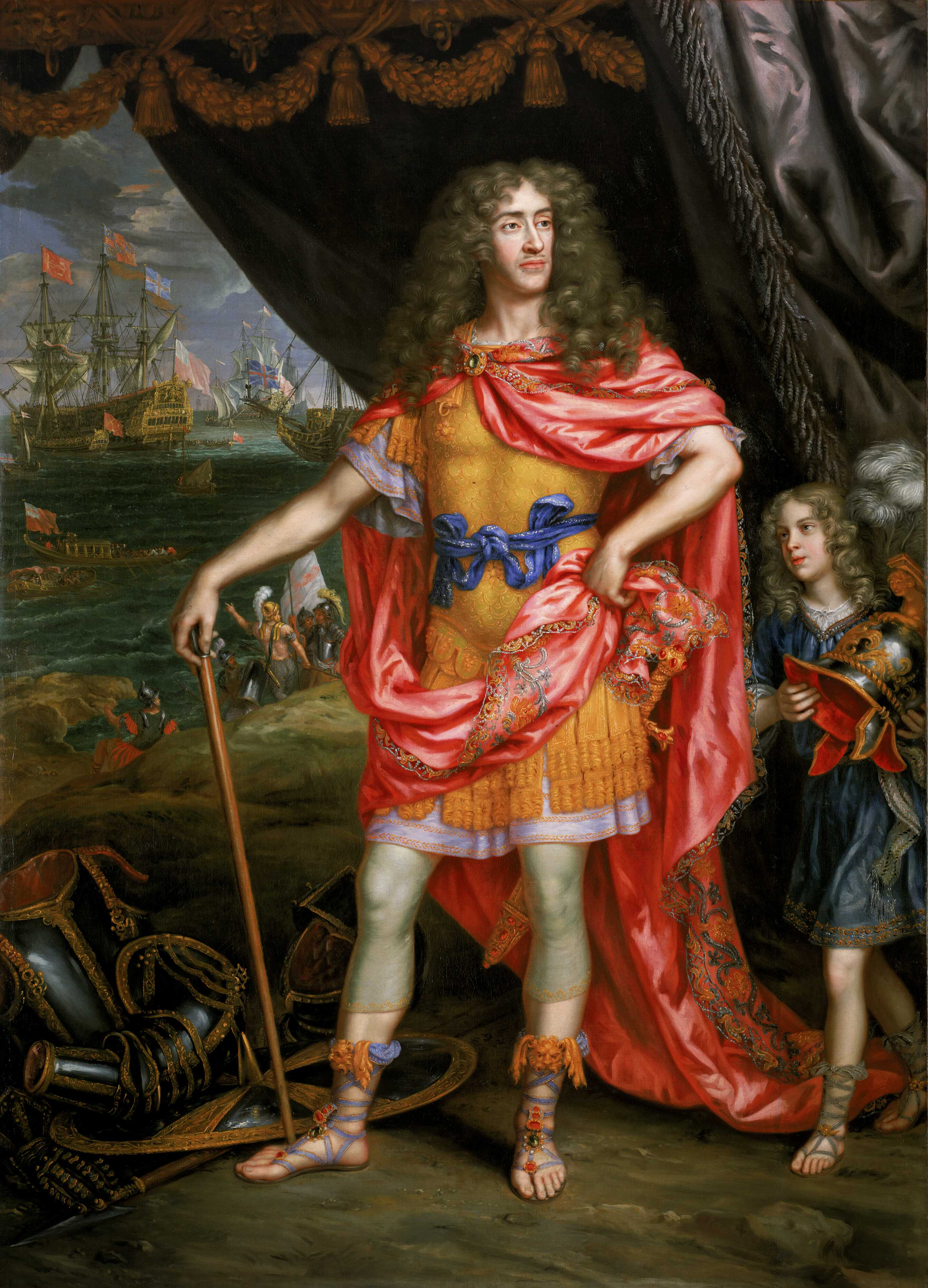
Portrait of James, Duke of York by Henri Gascar, 1673

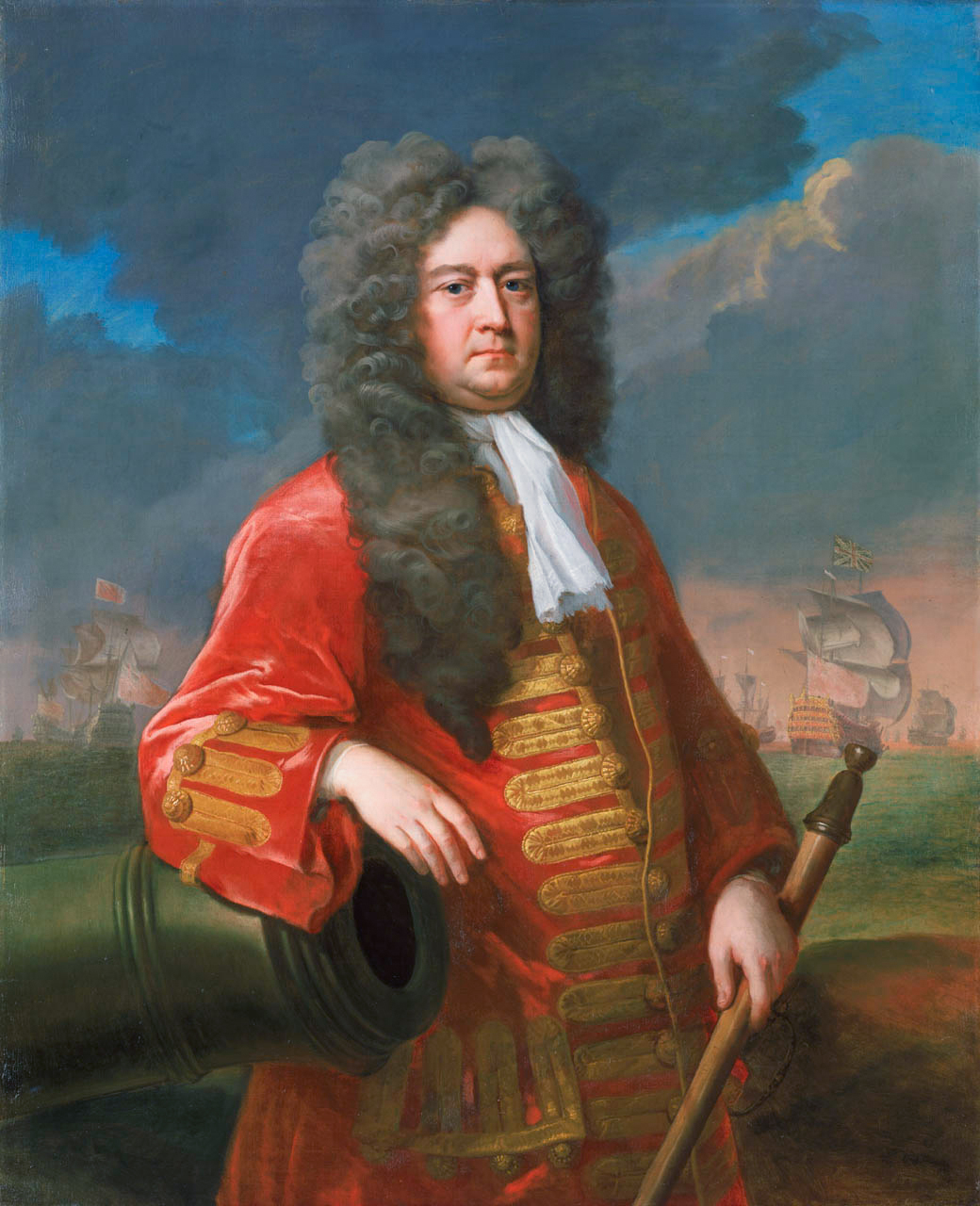
George Rooke by Michael Dahl, c. 1705

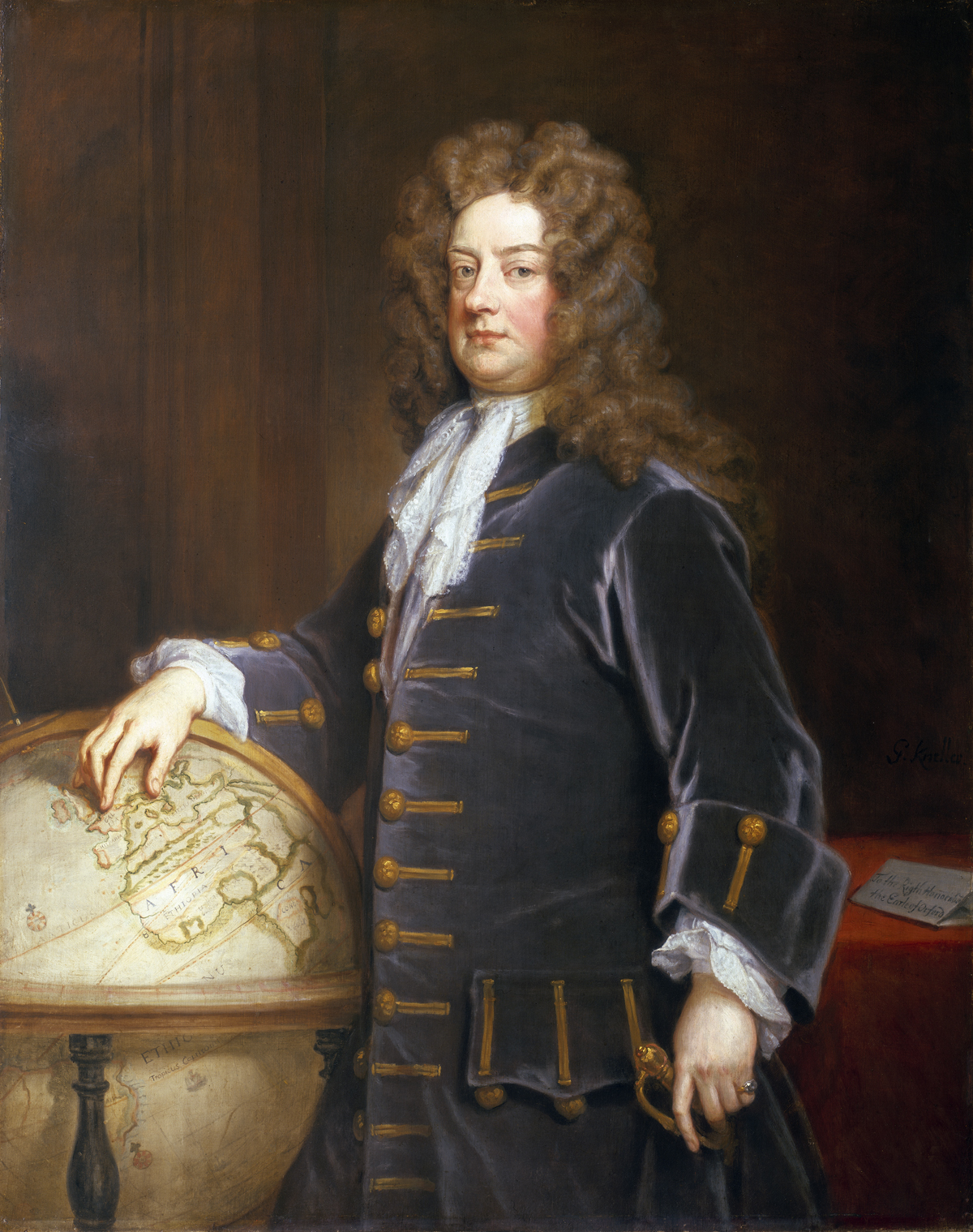
Edward Russell by Godfrey Kneller, c. 1710

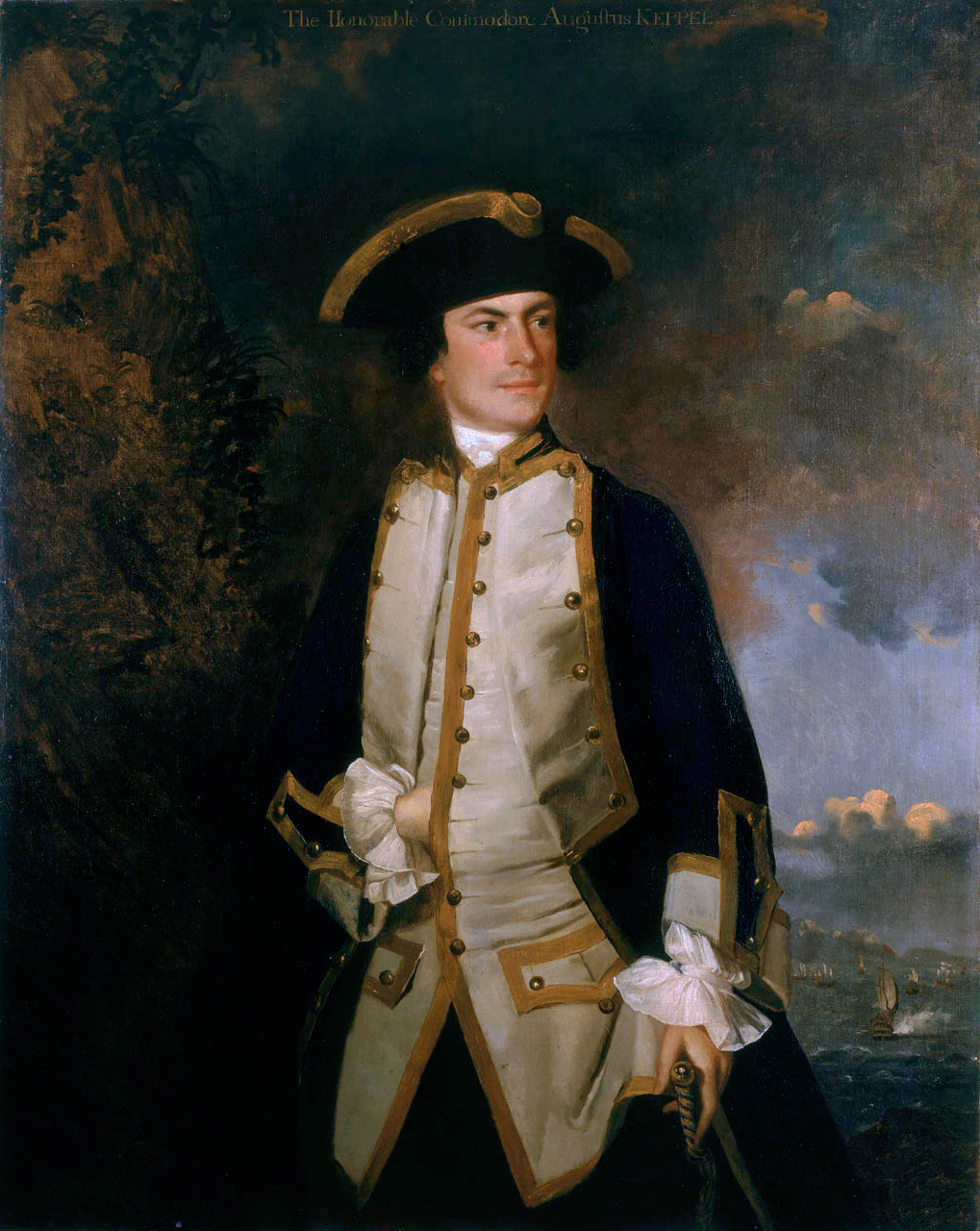
Portrait of Augustus Keppel by Joshua Reynolds, 1749

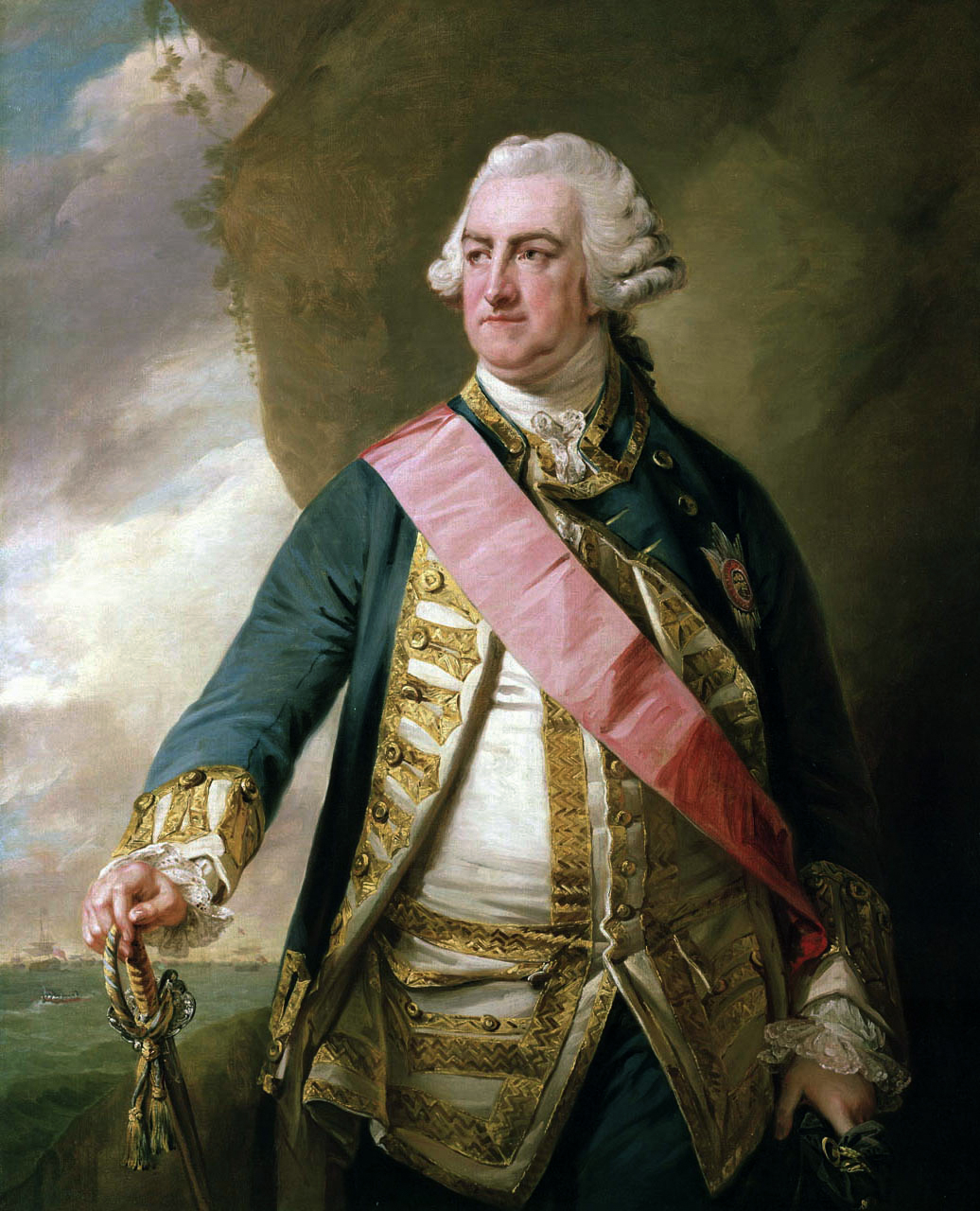
Edward Hawke by Francis Cotes, c. 1768

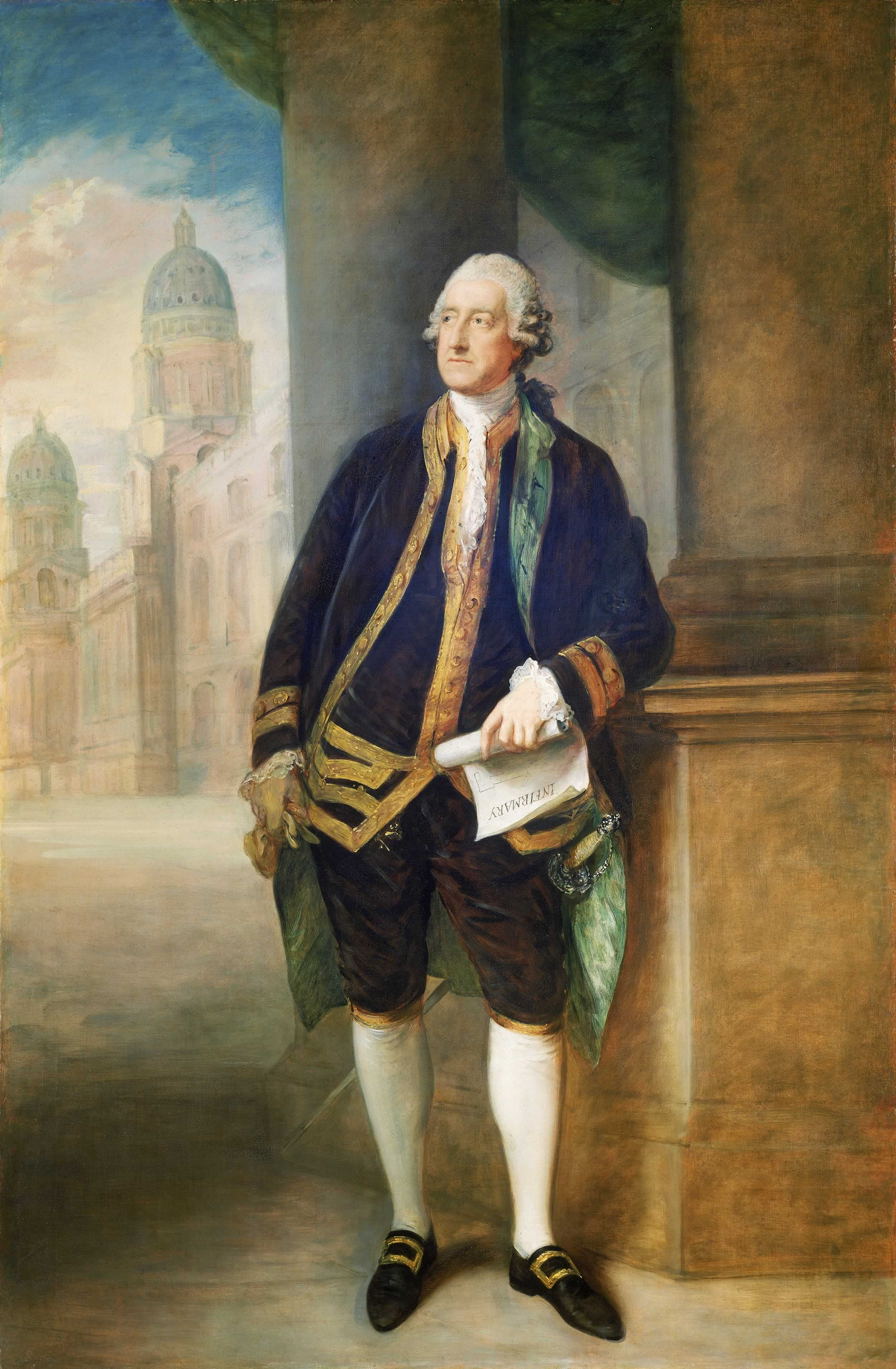
Portrait of the Earl of Sandwich by Thomas Gainsborough, 1783

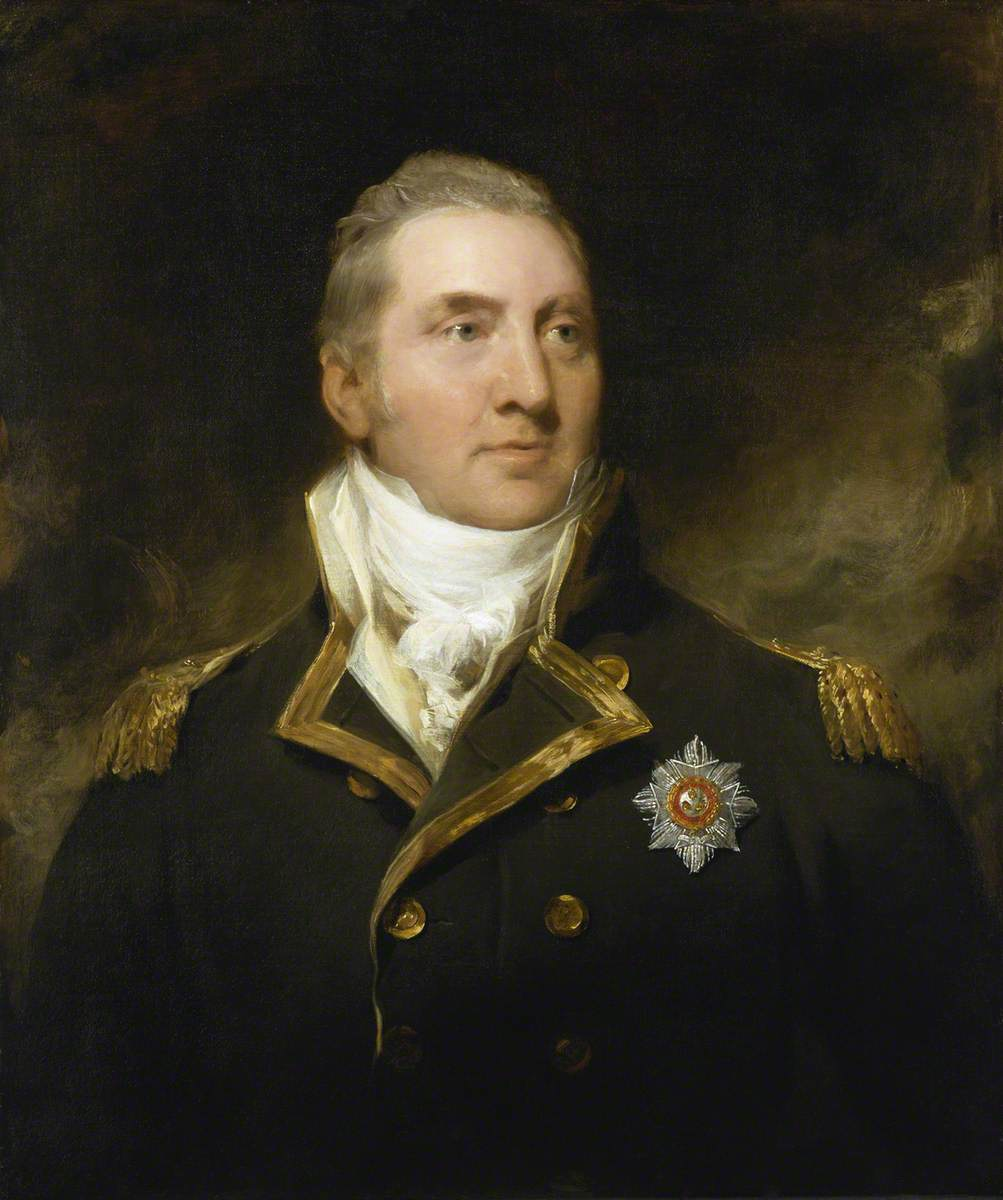
Portrait of Sir Edward Pellew by Thomas Lawrence, 1797

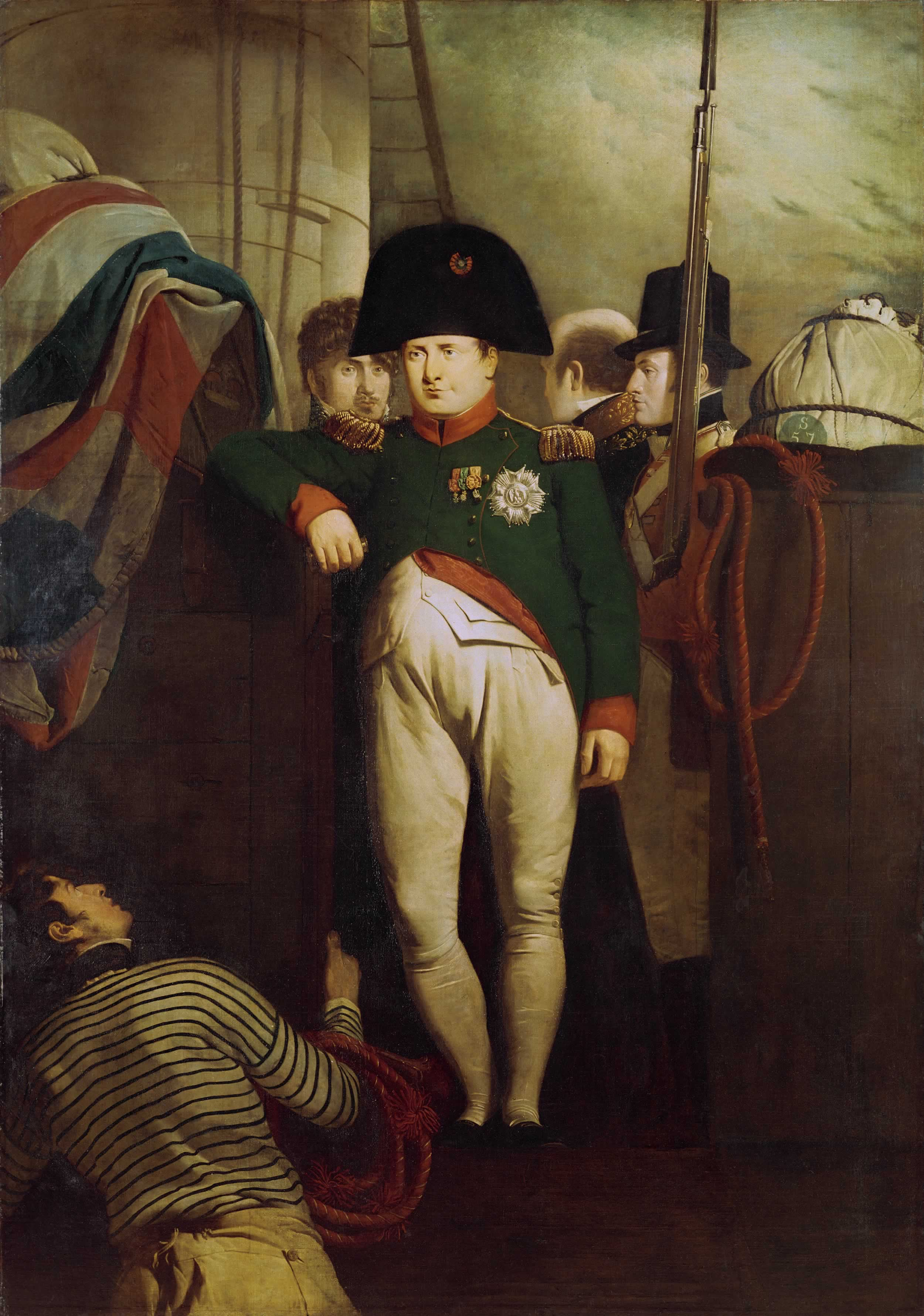
Napoleon on the Bellerophon by Charles Lock Eastlake, 1815

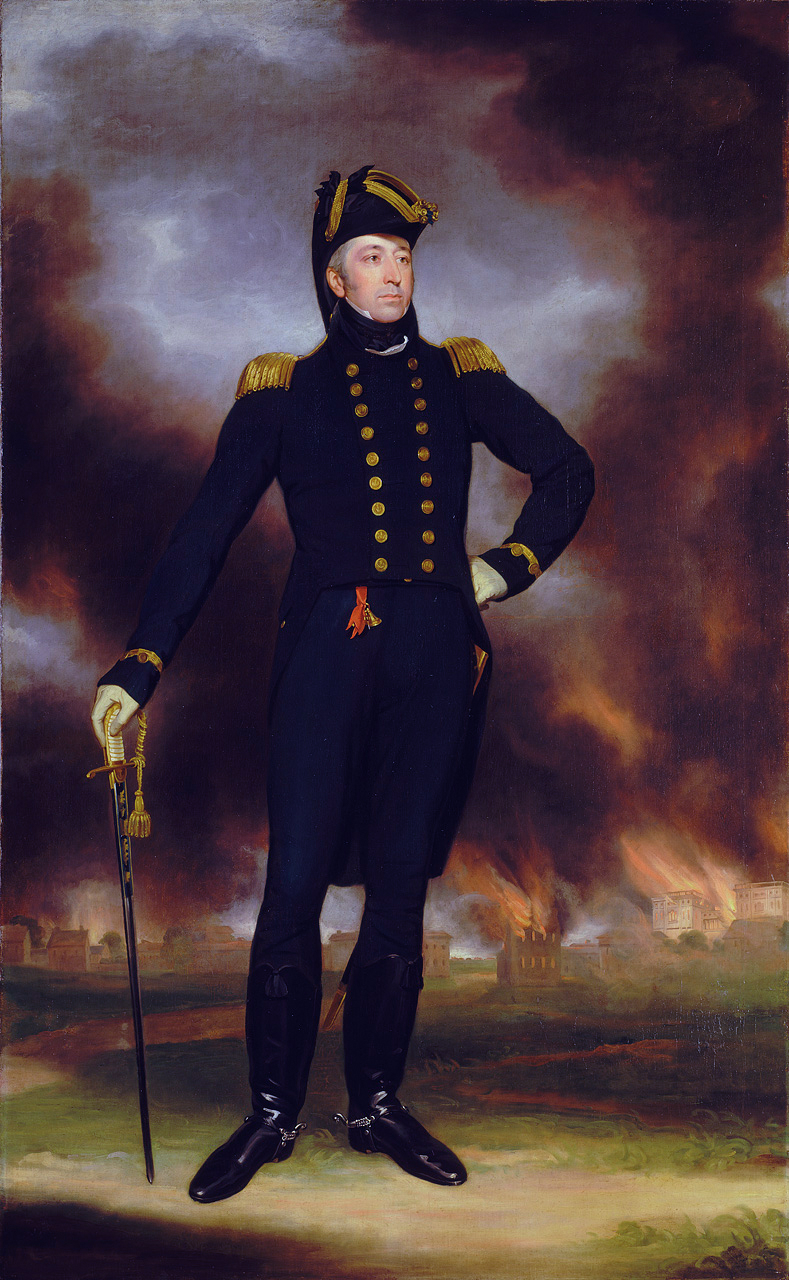
Portrait of George Cockburn by John James Halls, 1817

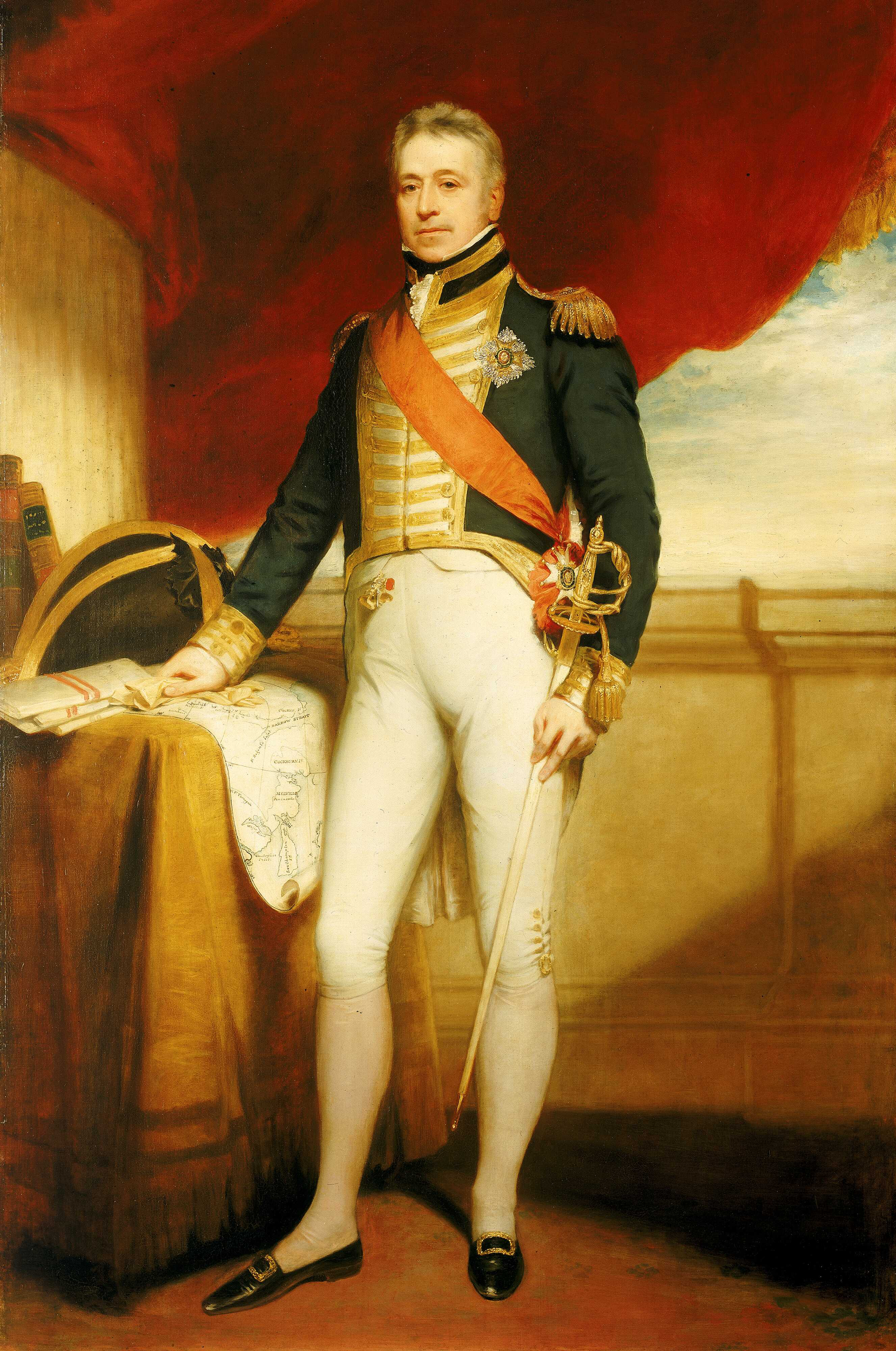
Portrait of George Cockburn by William Beechey, 1820

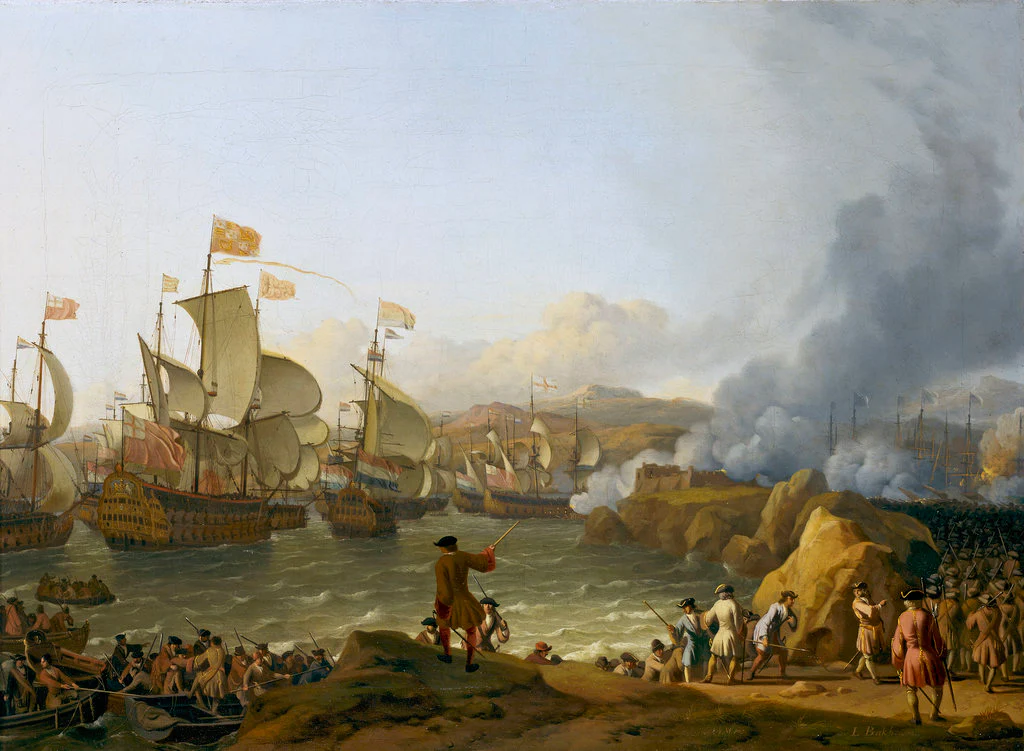
The Battle of Vigo by Ludolf Bakhuizen, 1702

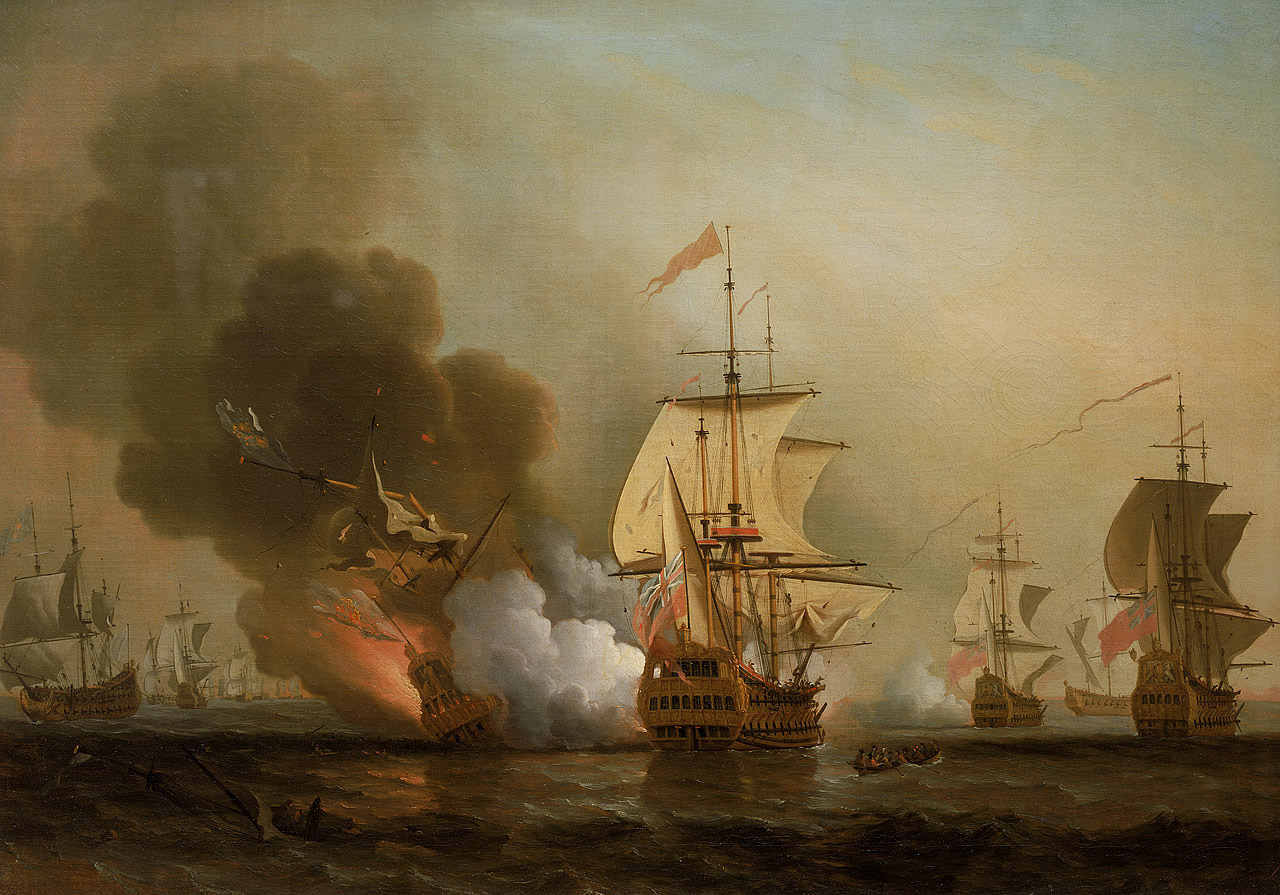
Wager's Action off Cartagena by Samuel Scott, c. 1747

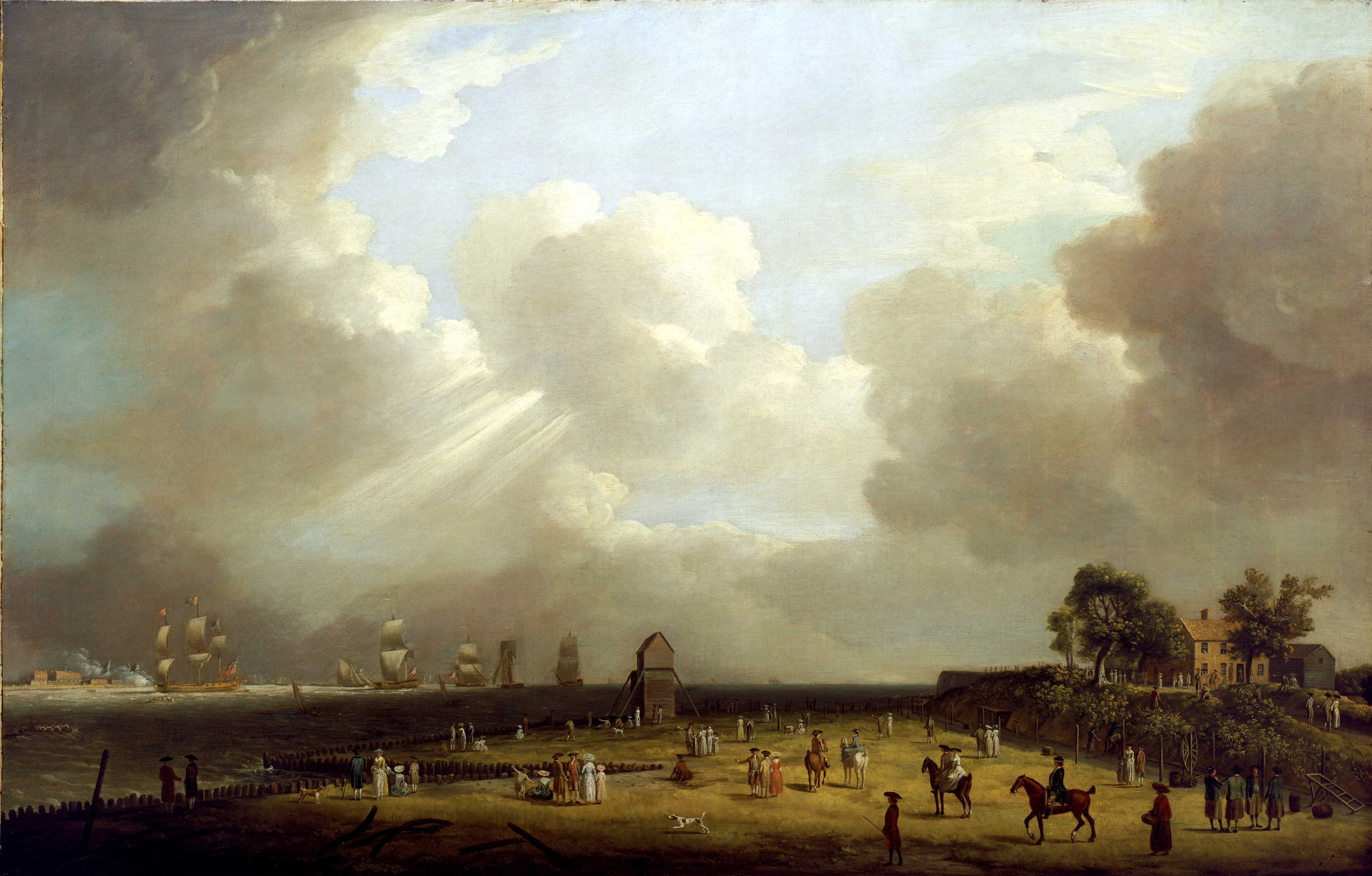
Princess Charlotte Arriving at Harwich by Dominic Serres, 1763

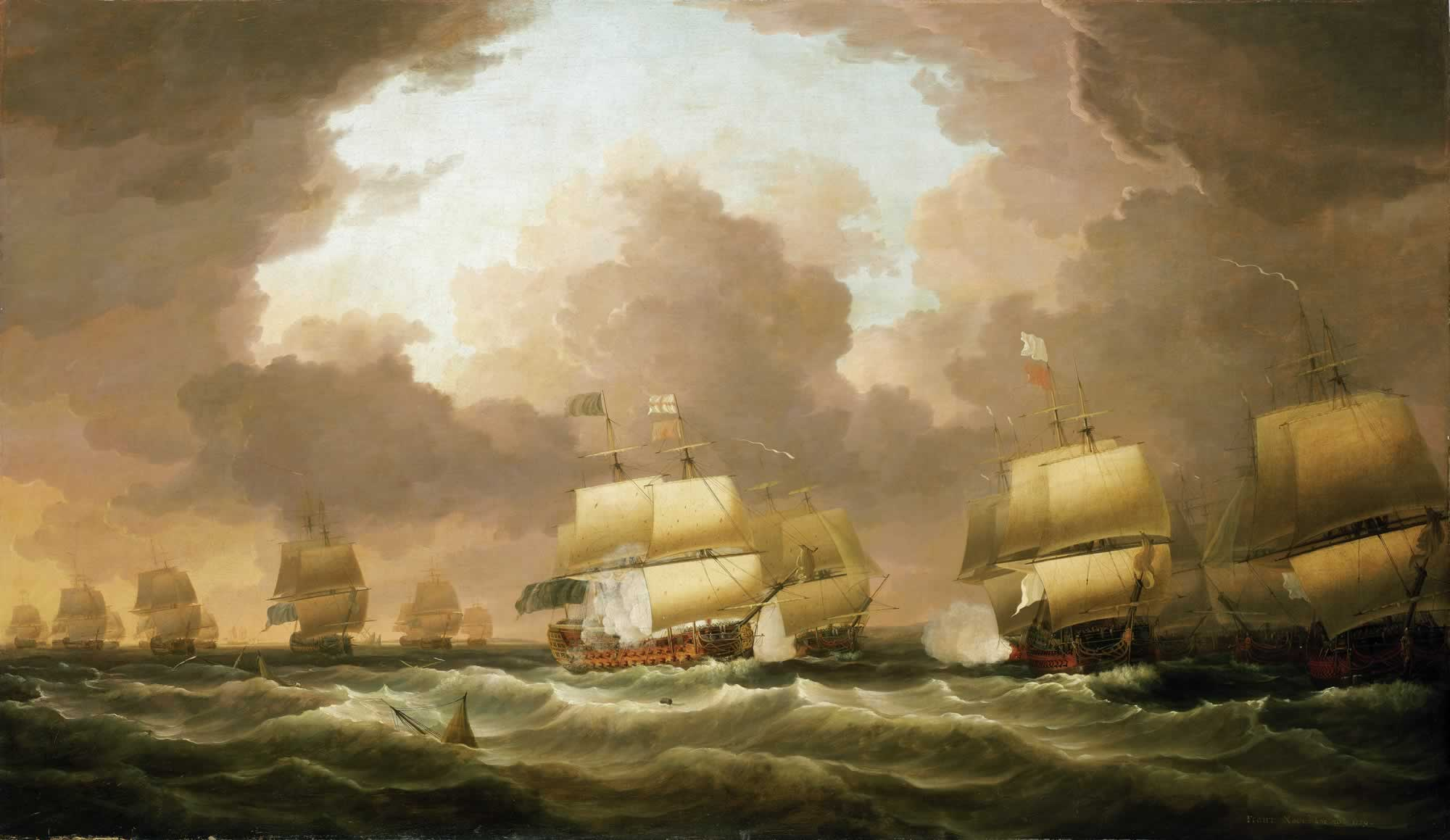
The Battle of Quiberon Bay by Dominic Serres, 1779

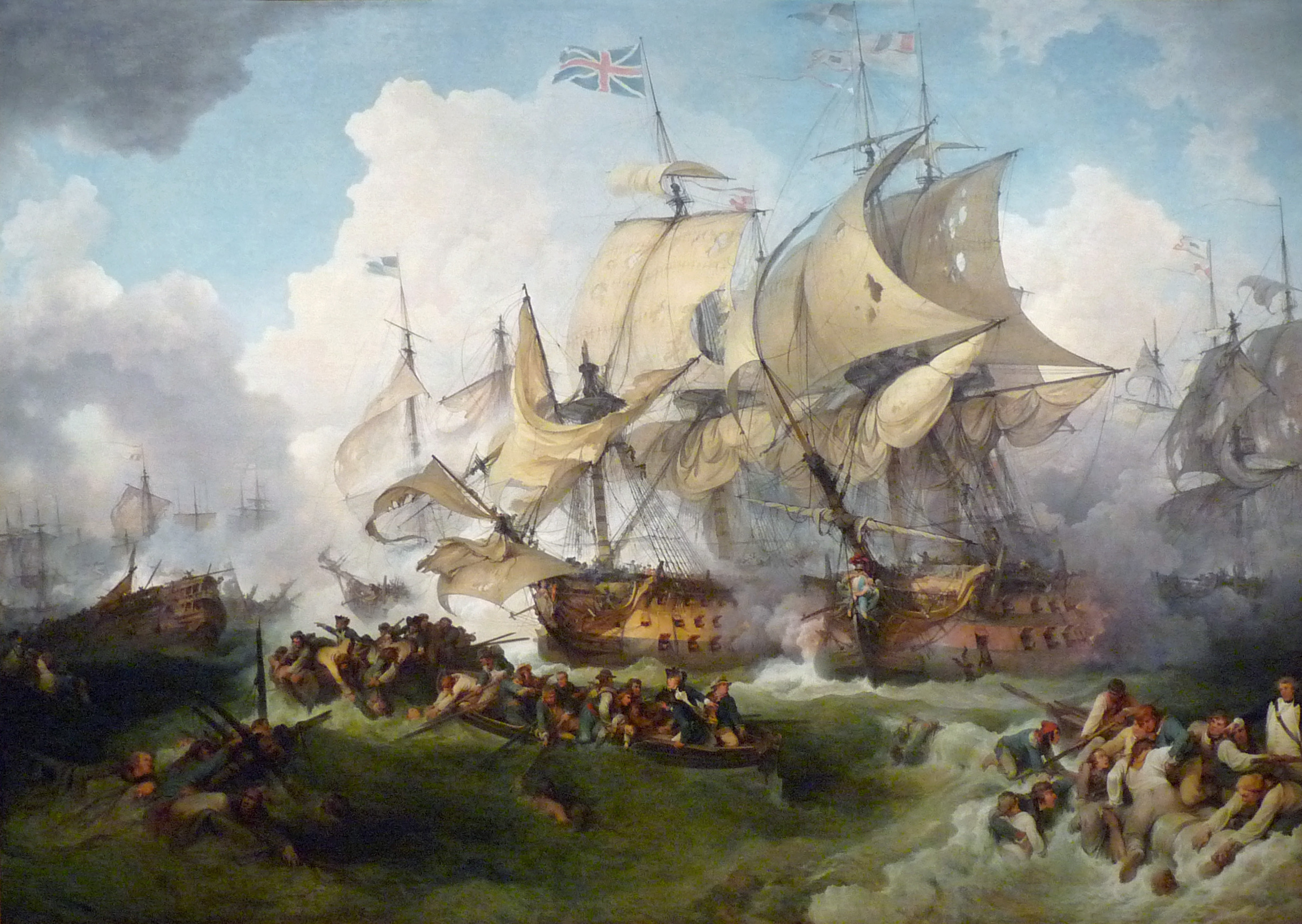
Lord Howe's Action, or the Glorious First of June by Philip James de Loutherbourg, 1795

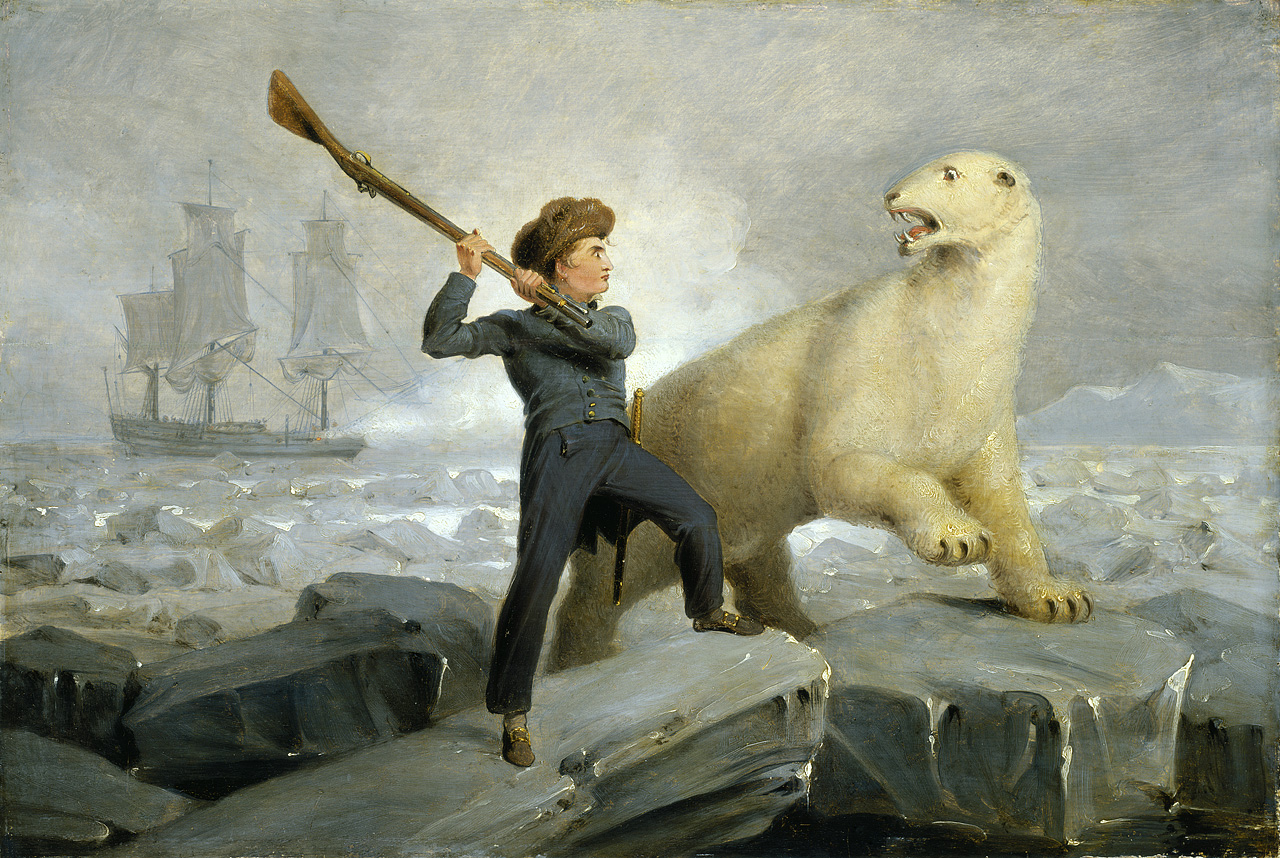
Nelson and the Bear by Richard Westall, 1809

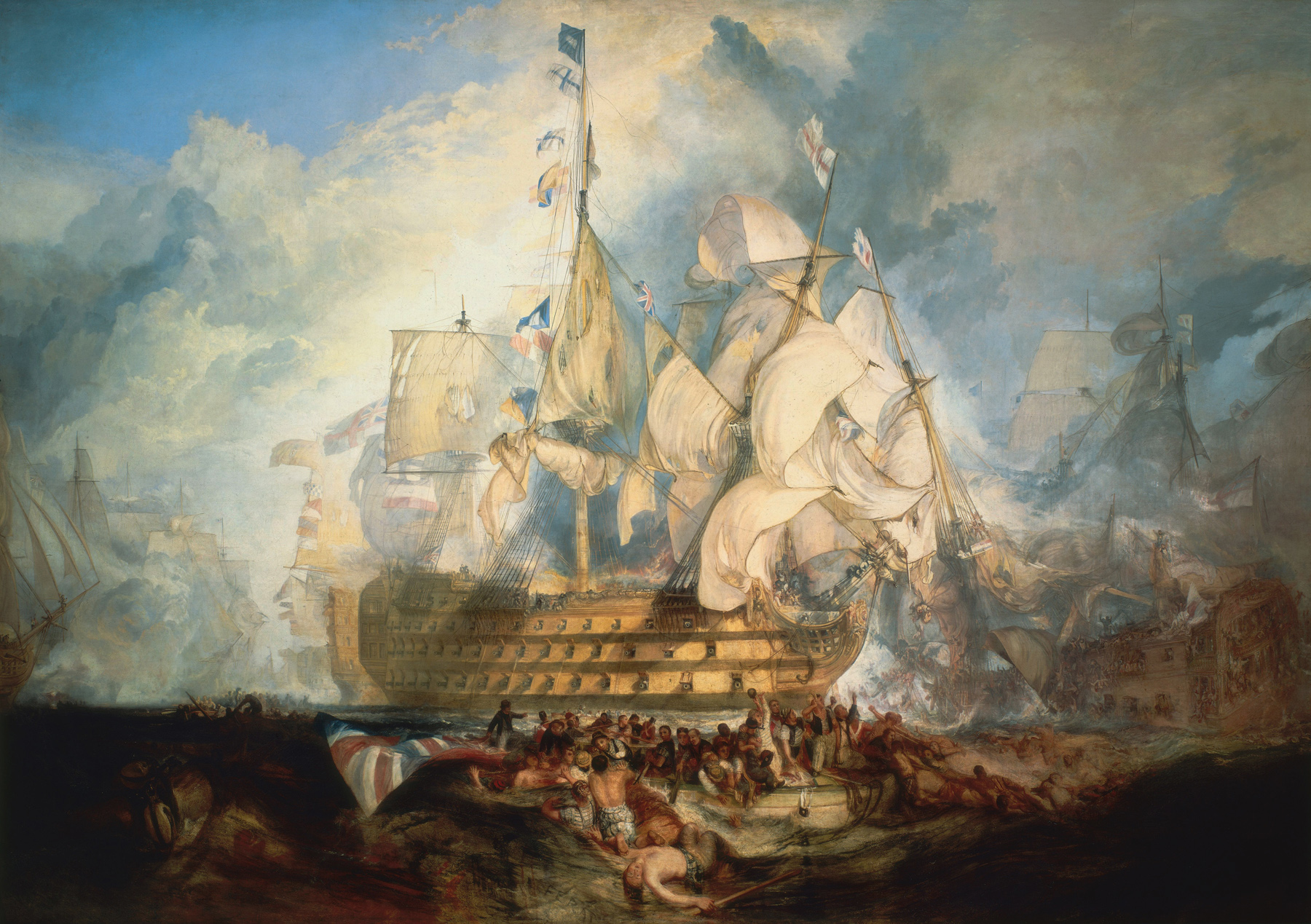
The Battle of Trafalgar by J. M. W. Turner, 1822–24

Nelson Boarding the San Josef by George Jones 1829

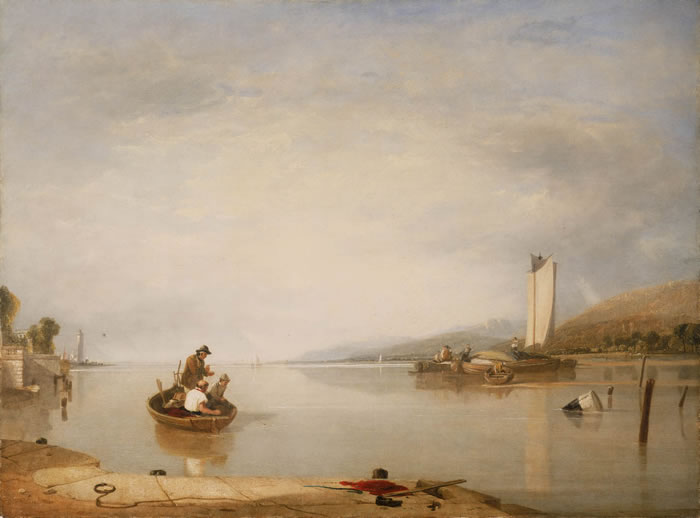
Dead Calm by Augustus Wall Callcott, 1827

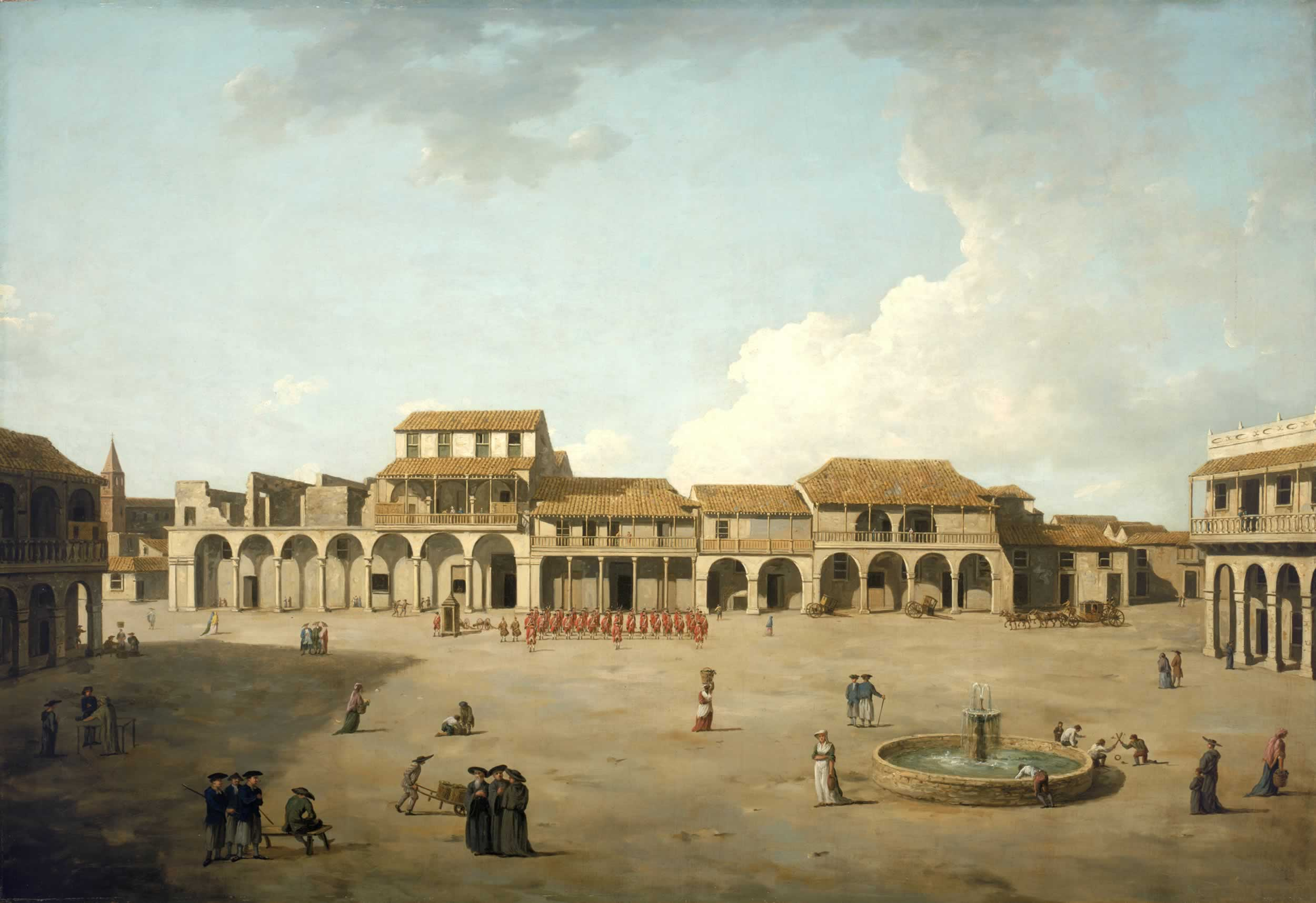
The Piazza at Havana by Dominic Serres, c. 1770

== See also ==
- Britain and the Sea
- Greenwich Visitor Centre
- List of London museums
- National Historic Fleet
- National Museum of the Royal Navy
- National Waterways Museum—the UK's national museum of inland waterway transport
- Het Scheepvaartmuseum (Netherlands Maritime Museum)
