= Nathaniel Pearce =

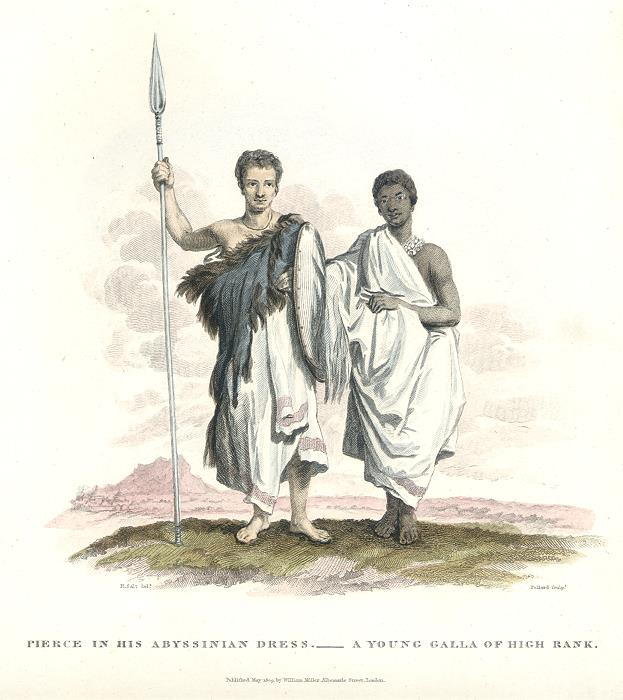
Painting of Pearce and an Oromo, then known by the now-derogatory term 'Galla'. Engraving by Robert Pollard.

Nathaniel Pearce (14 February 1779 – 12 August 1820) was an English explorer who spent many years in the Ethiopian Empire (then called 'Abyssinia' by Europeans) and wrote a journal of his experiences.

== Early life ==
Pearce was born in East Acton near London, and was educated at private schools, but, proving wild and incorrigible, was apprenticed to a carpenter and joiner in Duke Street, Grosvenor Square. He soon ran away to sea, and on his return was apprenticed to a leather-seller, whom he left suddenly to enlist on the cutter HMS Alert. In May 1794 he was taken prisoner by the French; but after many attempts succeeded in escaping, and served again in the Royal Navy.

== In Abyssinia ==
Many adventures followed. Deserting from HMS Antelope in July 1804, Pearce seems to have made his way to Mokha, Yemen and become a Muslim, but managed to reach, on 31 December 1804, the vessel that was conveying Viscount Valentia's mission to Abyssinia. After he arrived at Massawa on the Red Sea coast, he accompanied, in the summer of next year, Henry Salt as an English servant on his mission to the court of Ras Wolde Selassie of Tigray.

On Salt's departure in November, Pearce stayed behind in the service of the Ras. On more than one occasion he was compelled by jealous intriguers to quit the court, but by the autumn of 1807 he had made his position there secure. In 1808 he married the daughter of Sidee Paulus, a Greek. In 1810 he met Salt's second expedition, and escorted it from the coast and back. Pearce remained in Abyssinia till 1818, when he set out for Cairo on a visit to Salt. He reached Cairo in 1819, and, after a journey up the Nile, returned there and died in Alexandria from the results of exposure on 12 August 1820.

His journals, which are one long record of adventures, and contain a detailed account of the habits and customs of the Ethiopians, were edited by John James Halls, and published as The Life and Adventures of Nathaniel Pearce (London, 1831).
