= Edmund Kean as Richard III =

Painting by Francis Danby

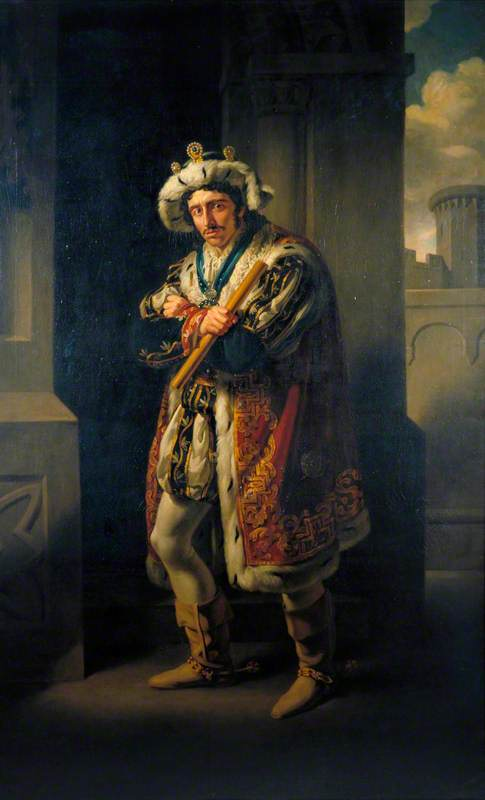
- Artist: John James Halls
- Year: 1814
- Type: Oil on canvas, portrait painting
- Dimensions: 144.8 cm × 83.8 cm (57.0 in × 33.0 in)
- Location: Victoria and Albert Museum, London

Edmund Kean as Richard III is an 1814 portrait painting by the British artist John James Halls. It depicts the English actor Edmund Kean in the title role of William Shakespeare's play Richard III. Kean was one of the most well known Shakesperian actors on the London stage during the Regency era, and premiered the role at the Theatre Royal, Drury Lane the year of the picture. The painting emphasizes the hunchback that was part of his elaborate costume for the part. Today the paintings is in the collection of the Victoria and Albert Museum in South Kensington, having been acquired in 1869.

== Bibliography ==
- Burwick, Frederick. Romantic Drama: Acting and Reacting. Cambridge University Press, 2009.
- Priestley, John Boynton . The Prince of Pleasure and His Regency, 1811-20. Harper & Row, 1969.
- Wilson, Jeffrey R. Richard III's Bodies from Medieval England to Modernity: Shakespeare and Disability History. Temple University Press, 2022.
