= Vice-admiral (Royal Navy) =

Flag officer rank of the Royal Navy

- Shoulder board and sleeve lace

- Distinguishing flag

- Motor car star plate
- Country: United Kingdom
- Service branch: Royal Navy
- Abbreviation: VAdm
- Rank group: Officers of flag rank
- Rank: Three-star rank
- NATO rank code: OF-8
- Next higher rank: Admiral
- Next lower rank: Rear-admiral
- Equivalent ranks: Lieutenant general (RM/British Army); Air marshal (RAF)

A vice-admiral (VAdm) is a flag officer rank of the Royal Navy and equates to the NATO rank code OF-8. It is immediately superior to the rear admiral rank and is subordinate to the full admiral rank.

The equivalent rank in the British Army and Royal Marines is lieutenant-general; and in the Royal Air Force, it is air marshal.

== History ==
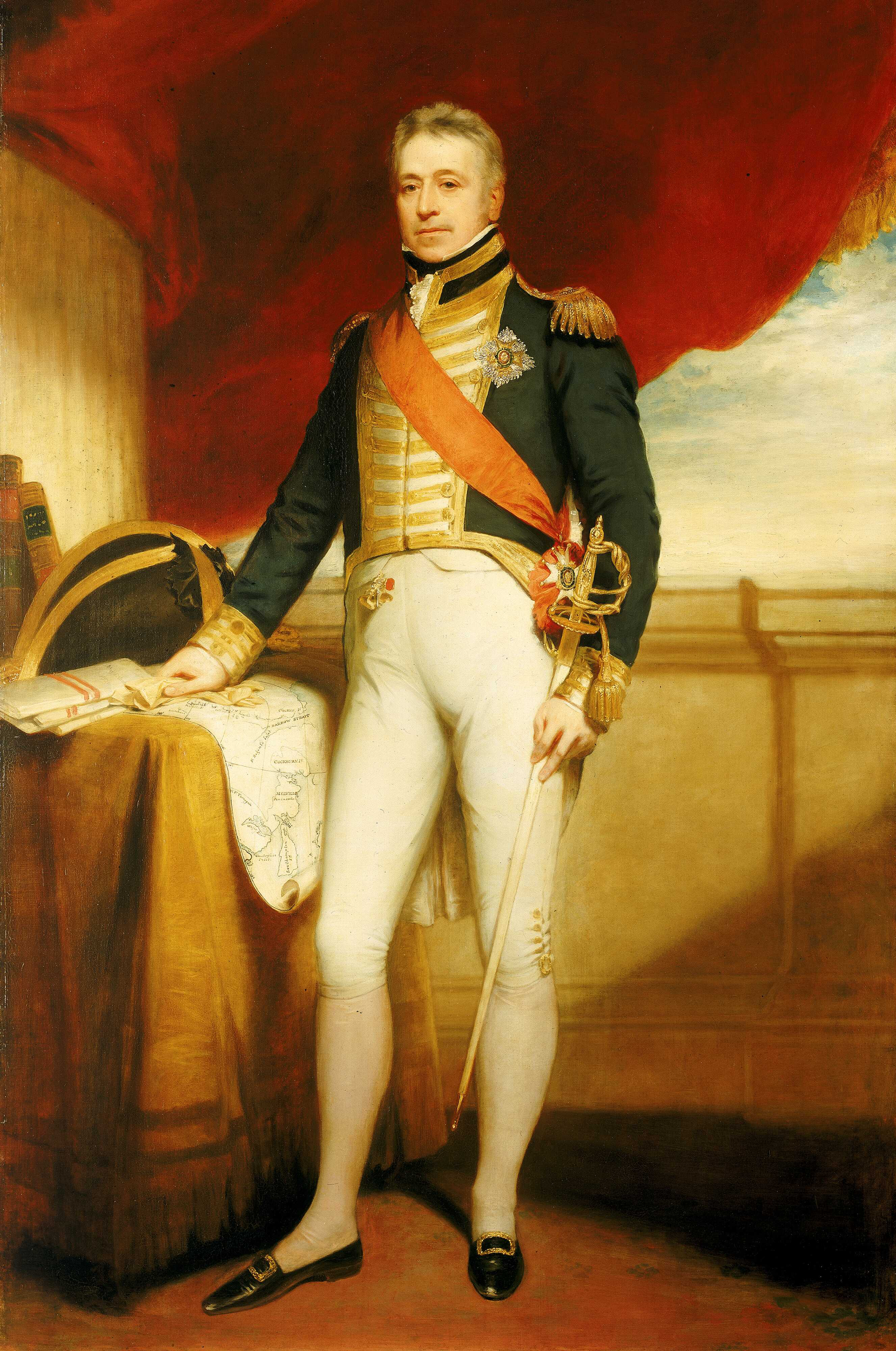
Portrait of George Cockburn by William Beechey, 1820. Cockburn is shown in the dress uniform of a Vice-Admiral

The Royal Navy has had vice-admirals since at least the 16th century. When the fleet was deployed, the vice-admiral would be in the leading portion or van, acting as the deputy to the admiral. The rank of Vice-Admiral evolved from that of Lieutenant of the Admiralty (1546–1564) that being an officer who acted as secretary to the Lord Admiral of England and lapsed in 1876 but was revived in 1901 by King Edward VII. Prior to 1864 the Royal Navy was divided into coloured squadrons which determined his career path. The command flags flown by a Vice-Admiral changed a number of times during this period.

In the Royal Navy, the rank of vice-admiral should be distinguished from the office of Vice-Admiral of the United Kingdom, which is an Admiralty position usually held by a retired full admiral, and that of Vice-Admiral of the Coast, a now obsolete office dealing with naval administration in each of the maritime counties.

== Rank insignia and personal flag ==
Vice-admirals are entitled to fly a personal flag. A vice-admiral flies a St George's cross defaced with a red disc in the hoist.

The rank of vice-admiral itself is shown in its sleeve lace by a broad band with two narrower bands. Since 2001, it has been designated a three-star rank, when the number of stars on the shoulder board were increased to three.

Sleeve lace

Shoulder board

Shoulder board prior to 2001

Command flag

== See also ==
- British and U.S. military ranks compared
- Coloured squadrons of the Royal Navy
- Comparative military ranks
- Royal Navy officer rank insignia
- Vice-Admiral of the Blue
- Vice-Admiral of the White
- Vice-Admiral of the Red
- List of Royal Navy vice admirals
