= John James Halls =

English painter

John James Halls (1776–1853) was an English painter.

== Life ==
A native of Colchester, he was named by his father after Jean-Jacques Rousseau. He was nephew through his mother of Dr. John Garnett, dean of Exeter.

Halls exhibited a landscape at the Royal Academy in 1791, and about 1797 settled as a professional artist in London. In 1802 he accompanied Henry Fuseli and others to Paris to study the collections brought together by Napoleon.

== Works ==
Halls exhibited in 1798 'Fingal assaulting the Spirit of Loda,' in 1799 'Zephyr and Aurora,' and in 1800 'Creon finding Hæmon and Antigone in the Cave.' Subsequently he chiefly devoted himself to portrait-painting, but he occasionally attempted ambitious subjects, like 'Lot's Wife' (1802), 'Hero and Leander' (1808), and 'Danae' (1811). A large picture (exhibited at the British Institution in 1813) of 'Christ raising the Daughter of Jairus,' won a premium, of two hundred guineas; it went to the church of St. Peter at Colchester. His 'A Witch—"but in a sieve I'll thither sail" from Macbeth' was engraved in mezzotint by Charles Turner in 1807. A full-length portrait of Charles Kean as Richard III by Halls was also engraved by Turner. A portrait of Lord Denman by Halls, exhibited at the Royal Academy in 1819, went to the National Portrait gallery.

Halls completed in 1813 a stained-glass window for Lichfield Cathedral, a commission which he obtained through his friend, Henry Salt. In 1831 he edited The Life and Adventures of Nathaniel Pearce, from Pearce's journals in Abyssinia, and in 1834, The Life and Correspondence of Henry Salt, F.R.S., with a portrait of Salt, painted by himself, and engraved by Samuel Freeman.

== Gallery ==
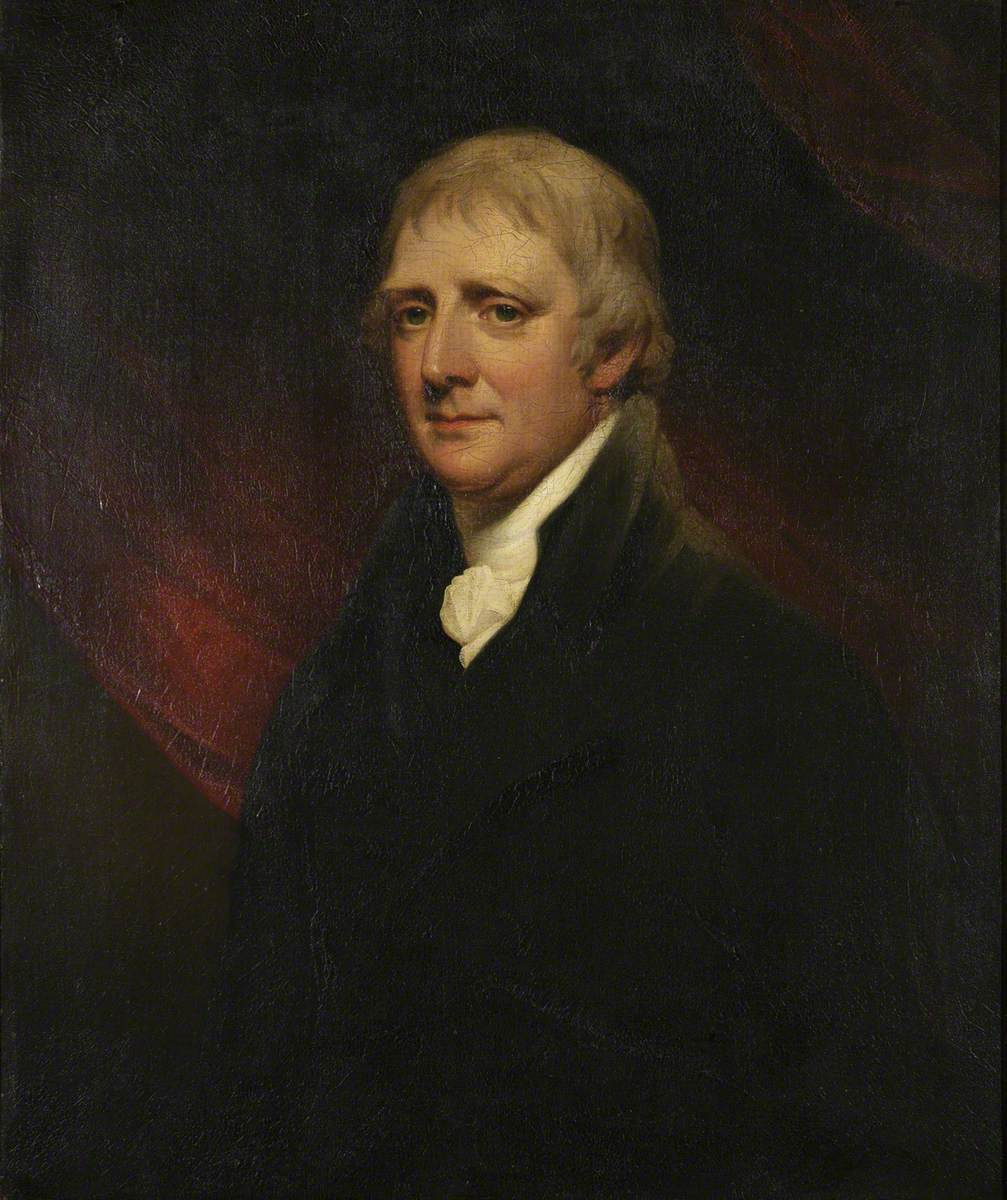
Portrait of Sir Richard Croft, 1803

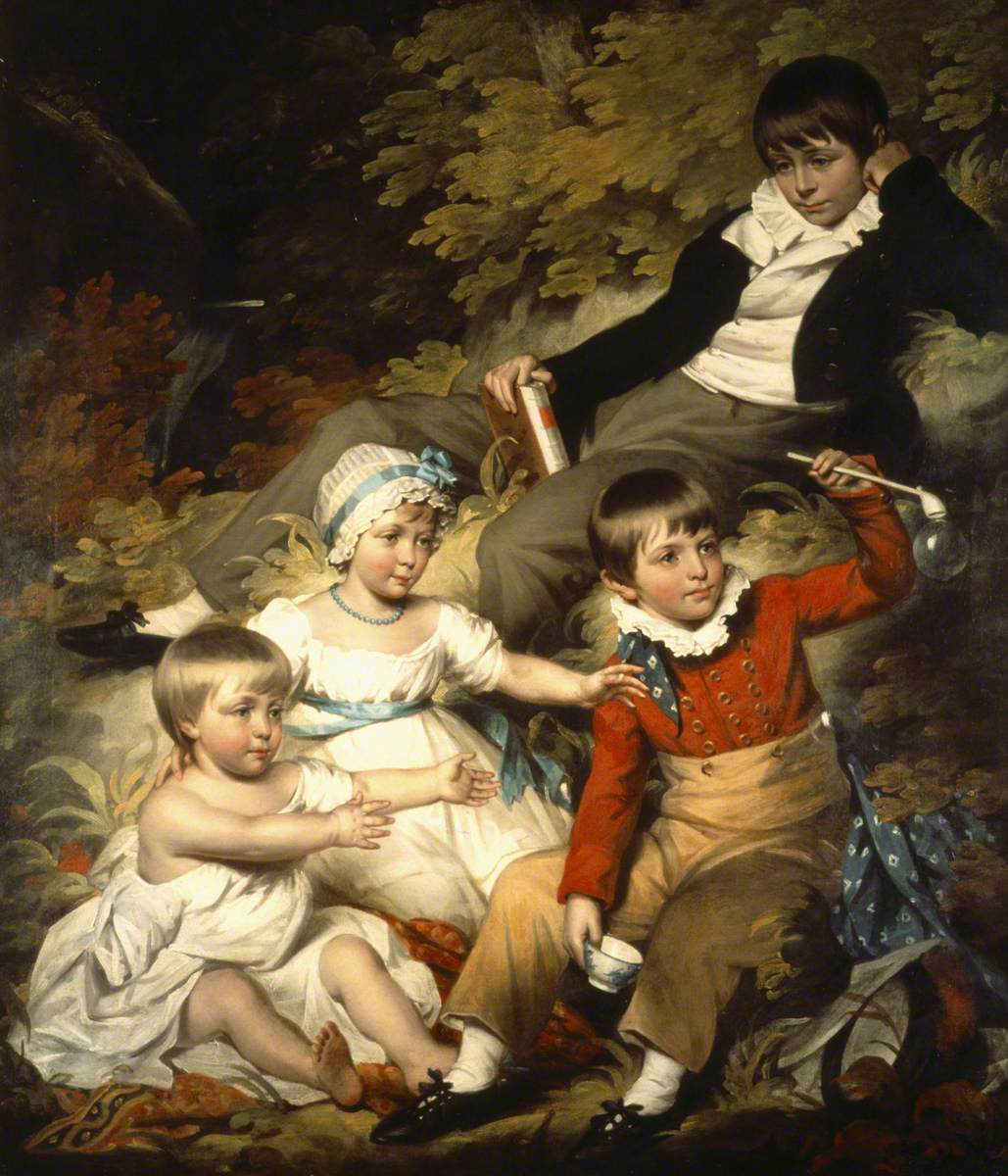
The Four Eldest Children of Sir Richard Croft, 1803

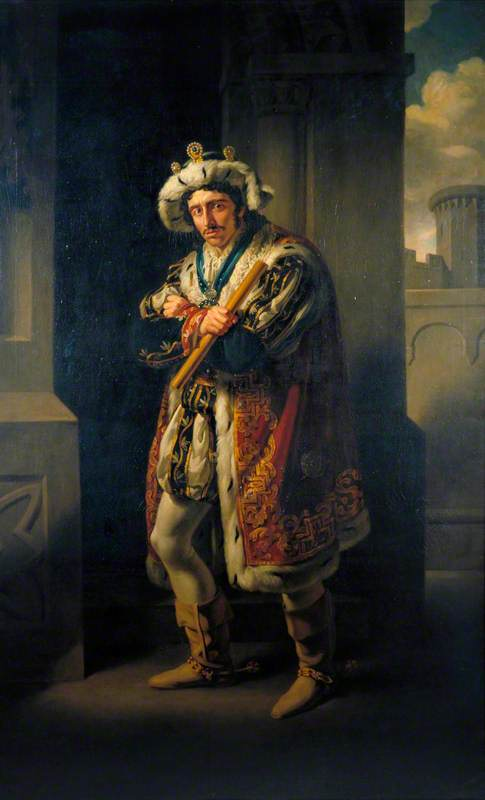
Edmund Kean as Richard III, 1814

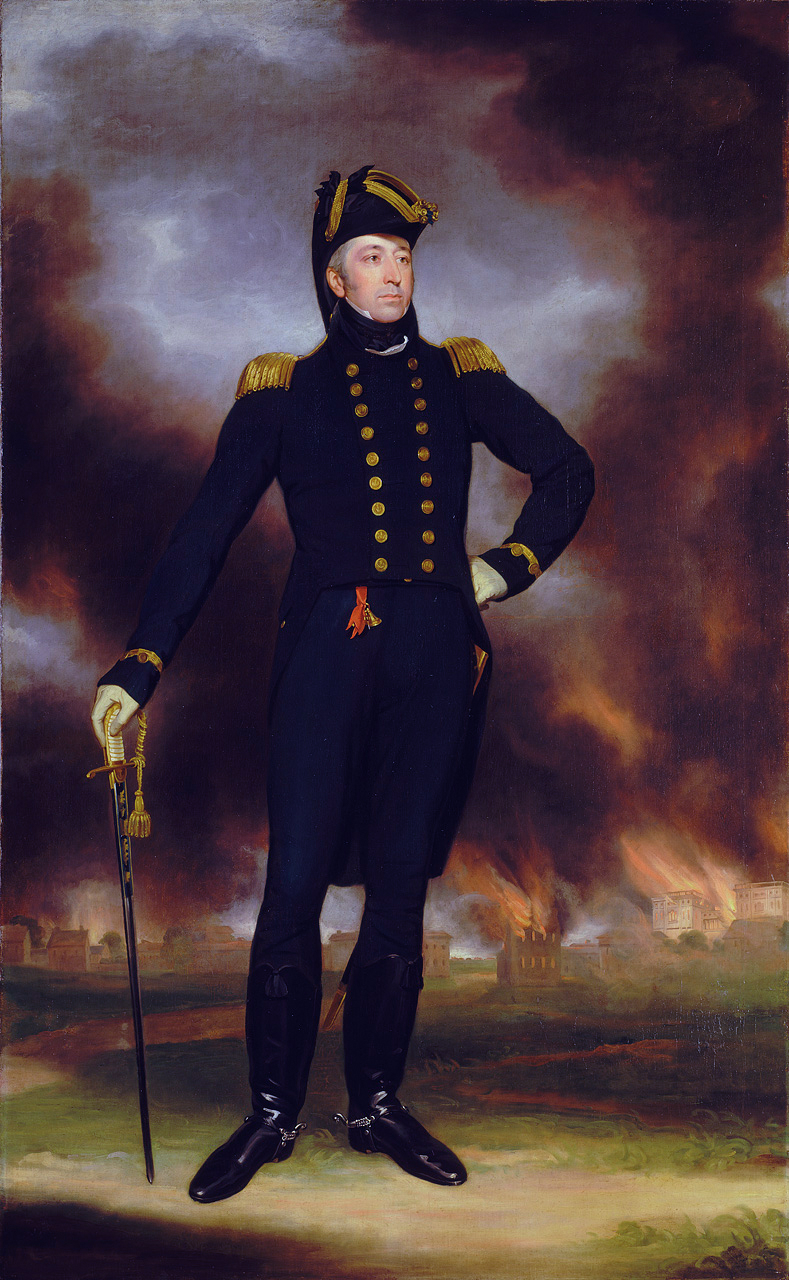
Portrait of George Cockburn, 1817

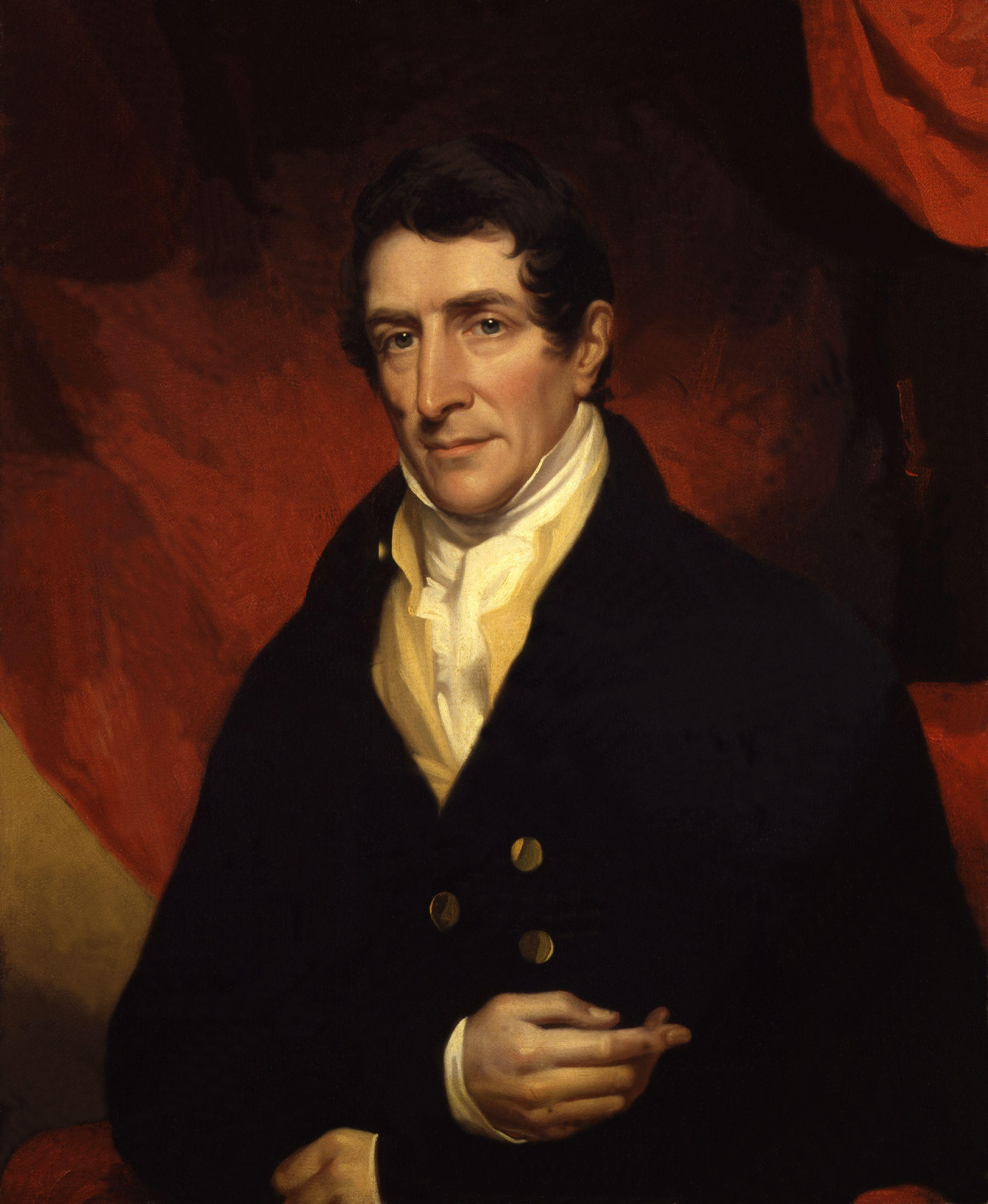
Portrait of Lord Denman, 1819

== Notes ==
Attribution

This article incorporates text from a publication now in the public domain: "Halls, John James". Dictionary of National Biography. London: Smith, Elder & Co. 1885–1900.
