= Portrait of George Cockburn (Beechey) =

Painting by William Beechey

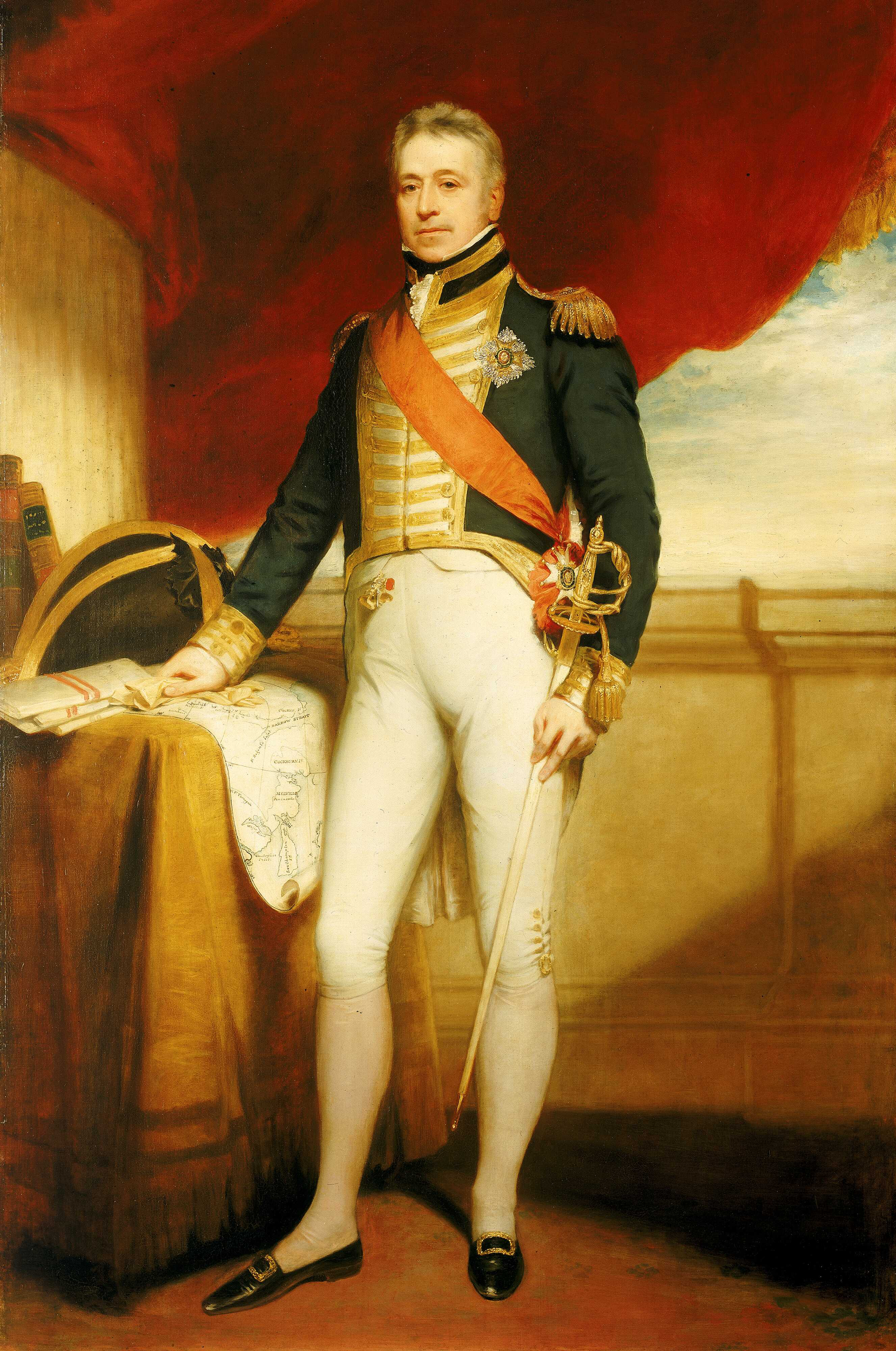
- Artist: William Beechey
- Year: 1820
- Type: Oil on canvas, portrait
- Dimensions: 241.3 cm × 147.7 cm (95.0 in × 58.1 in)
- Location: National Maritime Museum, Greenwich

Portrait of George Cockburn is an 1820 oil on canvas portrait of the Royal Navy officer Sir George Cockburn by the English painter William Beechey.

== History and description ==
Cockburn served for decades in the Royal Navy. In the War of 1812 he commanded British naval forces during the Burning of Washington. In 1815 he was charged with escorting the deposed French emperor Napoleon into exile and British captivity on the Atlantic island of Saint Helena. He later served as First Naval Lord.

Cockburn is shown wearing the dress uniform of a vice admiral and the star Order of the Bath. He wears the sword presented to him by Horatio Nelson in 1797 while his hand rests on a map of Cockburn Land on Baffin Island. The painting is in the collection of the National Maritime Museum in Greenwich. It was displayed at the Royal Academy Exhibition of 1824 at Somerset House in London.

== See also ==
- Portrait of Horatio Nelson, an 1801 painting by Beechey of another notable naval figure
- Portrait of George Cockburn, an 1817 painting by John James Halls

== Bibliography ==
- Miller, Amy. Dressed to Kill: British Naval Uniform, Masculinity and Contemporary Fashions, 1748-1857. National Maritime Museum, 2007.
- Morriss, Roger. Cockburn and the British Navy in Transition: Admiral Sir George Cockburn, 1772-1853. University of South Carolina Press, 1997.
