= Portrait of George Cockburn (Halls) =

Painting by John James Halls

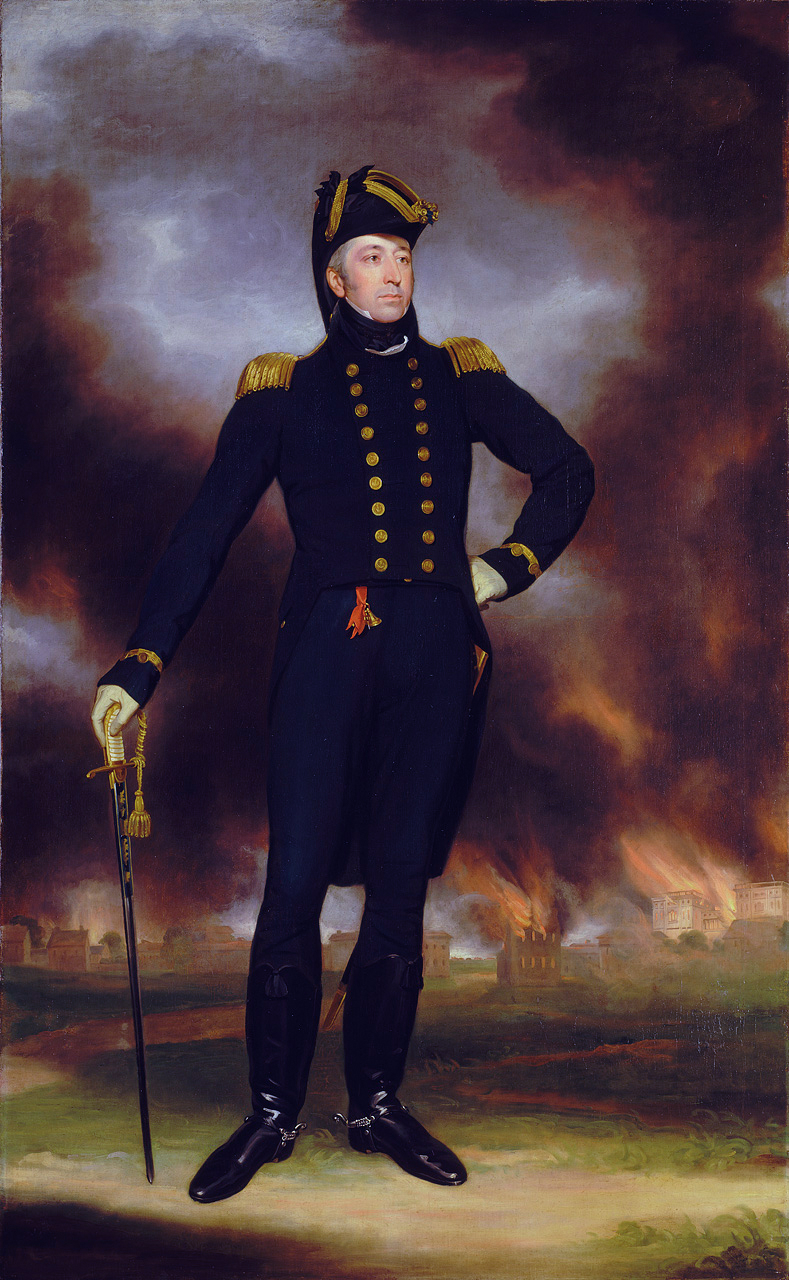
- Artist: John James Halls
- Year: 1817
- Type: Oil on canvas, portrait
- Dimensions: 239 cm × 148.5 cm (94 in × 58.5 in)
- Location: National Maritime Museum, Greenwich

Portrait of George Cockburn is an 1817 portrait painting by the English artist John James Halls depicting Sir George Cockburn, a British admiral of the Royal Navy. Amongst the most notable events of his career was his participation in the Burning of Washington during the War of 1812. He later escorted the defeated French Emperor Napoleon into his exile on the island of Saint Helena. The painting commemorates his role in the 1814 raid on the American capital.

He is shown at full-length in the dress uniform of a Rear admiral, with the Burning of the Capitol, Treasury and other public buildings in Washington as a backdrop. The work was exhibited at the Royal Acacademy's Summer Exhibition of 1817 at Somerset House. Today the painting is part of the collection of the National Maritime Museum in Greenwich. Three years later William Beechey produced his own Portrait of George Cockburn, now also in the National Maritime Museum.

== Bibliography ==
- Arthur, Brian. How Britain Won the War of 1812: The Royal Navy's Blockades of the United States, 1812-1815. Boydell & Brewer 2011.
- Miller, Amy. Dressed to Kill: British Naval Uniform, Masculinity and Contemporary Fashions, 1748-1857. National Maritime Museum, 2007.
- Morriss, Roger. Cockburn and the British Navy in Transition: Admiral Sir George Cockburn, 1772-1853. University of South Carolina Press, 1997.
- Taylor, Alan. The Internal Enemy: Slavery And War In Virginia 1772-1832. W.W. Norton & Company, 2013.
- Tucker, Spencer C. The Encyclopedia of the War of 1812: A Political, Social, and Military History. Bloomsbury Publishing, 2012.
