= Daniel A. Baugh =

American historian (1931–2024)

Daniel Albert Baugh (10 July 1931 – 9 February 2024) was an American historian. He has been labelled "as the definitive historian of [British] naval administration." Baugh defined his own contribution in explaining "My research field is mainly England, 1660–1840. By studying administration chiefly in terms of administrative problems, I hope to improve our understanding of both the nature of society and the development of government.". After 1982, he focused his attention on maritime, naval and geopolitical history. He died on 9 February 2024.

== Early life and education ==
The son of Albert C. Baugh (born 1891), a professor of English Literature, and his wife Nita Scudder Baugh, Daniel Baugh graduate from the Episcopal Academy and attended the University of Pennsylvania, where he earned his Bachelor of Arts degree in 1953. In 1954, he was commissioned in the United States Navy and served for three years, rising to the rank of lieutenant. In 1955, he married Carol Allen Baugh, and together they had three children. Before completing his naval service in 1957, he earned his Master of Arts degree from the University of Pennsylvania. Moving on to Cambridge University, Baugh earned his Doctor of Philosophy degree at the University of Cambridge in 1961 with his thesis, completed under the supervision of John Ehrman, on British naval administration in the War of 1739–48.

== Academic career ==
In 1961, Princeton University appointed Baugh to history instructor, and in 1964, assistant professor of history. In 1969, the Cornell University Department of History appointed him associate professor and he remained at Cornell until his retirement.

Baugh received a Social Science Research Council Grant in 1966–1967, a National Endowment for the Humanities fellowship in 1977–1978 and a fellowship at the Shelby Cullom Davis Center, Princeton University, 1982–1983.

In 2011, the National Maritime Museum, Greenwich awarded him its Caird Medal in recognition of his distinguished career of scholarship on eighteenth century British naval history.

== Published works ==
- British naval administration in the age of Walpole, Princeton, N. J.: Princeton University Press, 1965.
- Aristocratic government and society in eighteenth-century England : the foundations of stability, edited with an introduction by Daniel A. Baugh. New York: New Viewpoints, 1975.
- Naval administration, 1715-1750, edited by Daniel A. Baugh. London: Printed for the Navy Records Society, 1977.
- The Global Seven Years War 1754-1763: Britain and France in a Great Power Contest. London: Longmans, 2011.

Major Articles and Contributions to Books:

- "Great Britain's Blue-Water Policy, 1689-1815," International History Review, 10 (February 1988), 33–58.
- "The Politics of Naval Failure, 1775-1777," American Neptune, 52 (Fall 1992), 221–46.
- "Admiral Sir Herbert Richmond and the Objects of Sea Power" in James Goldrick and John B. Hattendorf, eds. Mahan is Not Enough: The Proceedings of a Conference on the Works of Sir Julian Corbett and Admiral Sir Herbert Richmond. Newport: Naval War College Press, 1993.
- "Maritime Strength and Atlantic Commerce: The uses of 'a grand marine empire'" in An Imperial state at war: Britain from 1689 to 1815, edited by Lawrence Stone. London; New York: Routledge, 1994.
- "The Eighteenth Century Navy as a National Institution, 1690-1815," in J. R. Hill and Bryan Ranft, eds., The Oxford Illustrated History of the Royal Navy. Oxford: Oxford University Press, 1995.
- "Elements of Naval Power in the Eighteenth Century", "Trade and Colonies: Financial and Maritime Strength, ca. 1714-1790", "The Global Warfare of Britain and France, 1739-1763: Aims, Strategies, Results", by Daniel Baugh, and "The War for America, 1775-1783" by Daniel Baugh and N. A. M. Rodger" in John B. Hattendorf, ed. Maritime History, vol. 2. The Eighteenth Century and the Classic Age of Sail. Malabar, FL: Krieger Publishing, 1997.
- "Withdrawing from Europe: Anglo-French Maritime Geopolitics, 1750-1800," International History Review, 20 (March 1998), 1-32.
- "Naval power: What gave the British navy superiority?" in Leandro Prados de la Escosura, ed., Exceptionalism and Industrialism: Britain and Its European Rivals, 1688-1815. Cambridge: Cambridge University Press, 2005.
