= Fire ship (disambiguation) =

A fire ship was a ship filled with combustibles, deliberately set on fire.

Fire ship may also refer to:

- Fireship (song), a risqué variation of the song "Roving Kind"
- The Fireship, one of a series of nautical novels by C. Northcote Parkinson
- Fireships (album), a 1992 album by Peter Hammill
