= Edward Lloyd (coffee house owner) =

British businessman (c. 1648–1713)

Edward Lloyd (c. 1648 – 15 February 1713) was the British owner of a London-based eponymous coffee house, a publisher and the origin of the names of the Lloyd's of London insurance market, the Lloyd's List shipping journal and Lloyd's Register.

Little is known about Lloyd's early life until he opened his coffee house near the Port of London around 1685–1687. It became a favoured location of merchants, ship owners and sailors and Lloyd provided them with information about ship and cargo movements, maritime losses and market prices. In 1691 Lloyd moved the coffee house to larger premises on the corner of Lombard Street, in the centre of London's business and finance district. It continued to attract businesspeople, particularly in shipping, and he introduced two short-lived news-sheets—Lloyd's News and one with the running title "Ships arrived at, and departed from several ports of England".

In Britain, in addition to running his coffee house, Lloyd was a churchwarden, constable and questman, an early form of community policeman. Abroad he was sufficiently well known in shipping circles that his name was used as a reference in the West Indies and the ports of the Hanseatic League. On his death he bequeathed his coffee house to his daughter, who had recently married the head waiter. Lloyd's name was used when a subsequent owner launched Lloyd's List in 1734, providing shipping news; as at 2025 the publication is still being produced. Lloyd's name was also used when the businessman John Julius Angerstein opened a more formal institution for trading, naming it New Lloyd's; this body grew to become Lloyd's of London.

== Biography ==
References to Edward Lloyd's Coffee House in The London Gazette

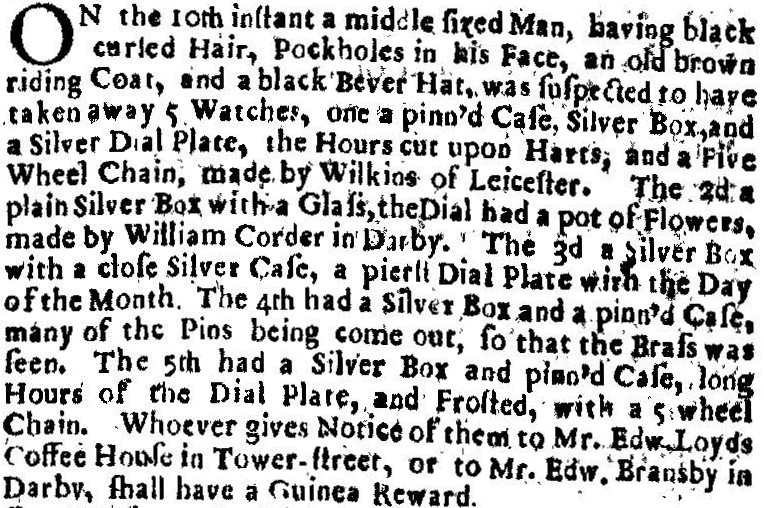
From 21 February 1688

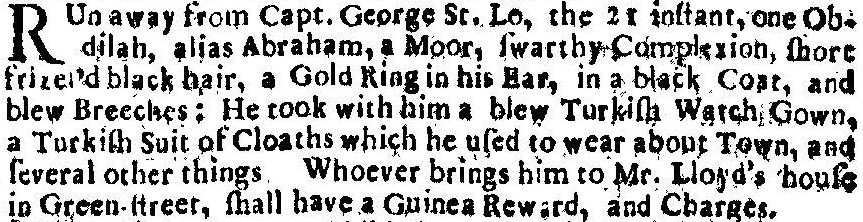
From 25 June 1688

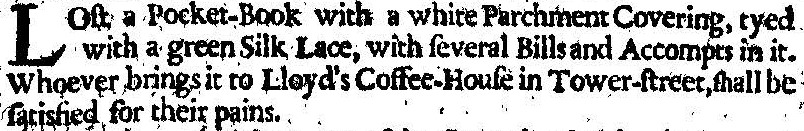
From 26 August 1689

Little is known about Edward Lloyd's early life or his origins, although the writer Sydney Brooks states that he was Welsh and Lloyd's of London—the insurance organisation that still carries his name—states that he originated in Canterbury, Kent. From later records his date of birth has been placed to c. 1648. (Note: At the time of his second marriage, in 1698, Lloyd was described as "of the age of about fifty years".) It is thought his father was with the Worshipful Company of Framework Knitters—the livery company involved with the hosiery and knitting industry—as was Lloyd. The writers Raymond Flower and Michael Wynn-Jones observe "it is generally believed that he did not serve his apprenticeship in this craft".

By September 1680 Lloyd was living with his wife, Abigail, in Red Cross Alley in the parish of All Hallows Barking in the City of London, near the Tower of London. Their infant son was buried in the local church that month. (Note: Neither Lloyd's marriage nor his son's birth was recorded in the parish register; the historian Vanessa Harding writes that it is likely that the family had only recently moved to the parish.) He was one of nine children born to the couple, although only four daughters survived to adulthood. The Lloyds lived in All Hallows Barking until at least December 1681; by September 1682 they were living in the nearby parish of St Dunstan-in-the-East.

Between March 1685 and March 1687 Lloyd opened his coffee house in Great Tower Street in the City of London. It is not known if he took over an existing outlet or opened a new venue; it is also not known if he had any experience in running a coffee-house. The venue was close to the Pool of London, an integral part of the Port of London; Lloyd's clientele included merchants, ship owners and sailors and he supplied them with relevant information about ship and cargo movements, maritime losses and market prices. He kept a corner of his coffee house for the use of captains only.

The first written reference to Lloyd's coffee house appeared in The London Gazette on 21 February 1688: an advertisement that information about five stolen watches could be left at the outlet, with a reward of one guinea. (Note: A guinea was a gold coin whose value fluctuated between twenty and thirty shillings (£1.00–£1.50) between 1663 and 1690. According to calculations based on the Consumer Price Index measure of inflation, 1 guinea in 1688 is approximately £270 in 2025.) Other advertisements naming the coffee-house were also posted in the Gazette. In June that year, one was placed for news of "one Obdilah, alias Abraham, a Moor, swarthy complexion, short frizzled black hair, a gold ring in his ear", who had run away from his master; one guinea was offered as a reward for him being delivered to the coffee house. In August the following year there was an advertisement for a lost notebook and a request it be handed in to Lloyd's coffee-house.

In 1691 Lloyd moved the coffee house to a larger premises on the corner of Lombard Street, where it had a single frontage, and Abchurch Lane, where it had a double front of about forty feet (12 m). Lombard Street had been central to London's business and finance district since the medieval period. The coffee house included what was described as a "pulpit" from which Lloyd or his staff made announcements or read the news; auctions also took place from the pulpit, often by candle. (Note: A candle auction entailed a pin or nail being placed an inch below the wick. The auction finished when the wax had melted enough for the pin to drop out onto a tin plate.) Within a year of moving to the new premises, the coffee house was prosperous enough for Lloyd to employ two men and three maids to staff it.

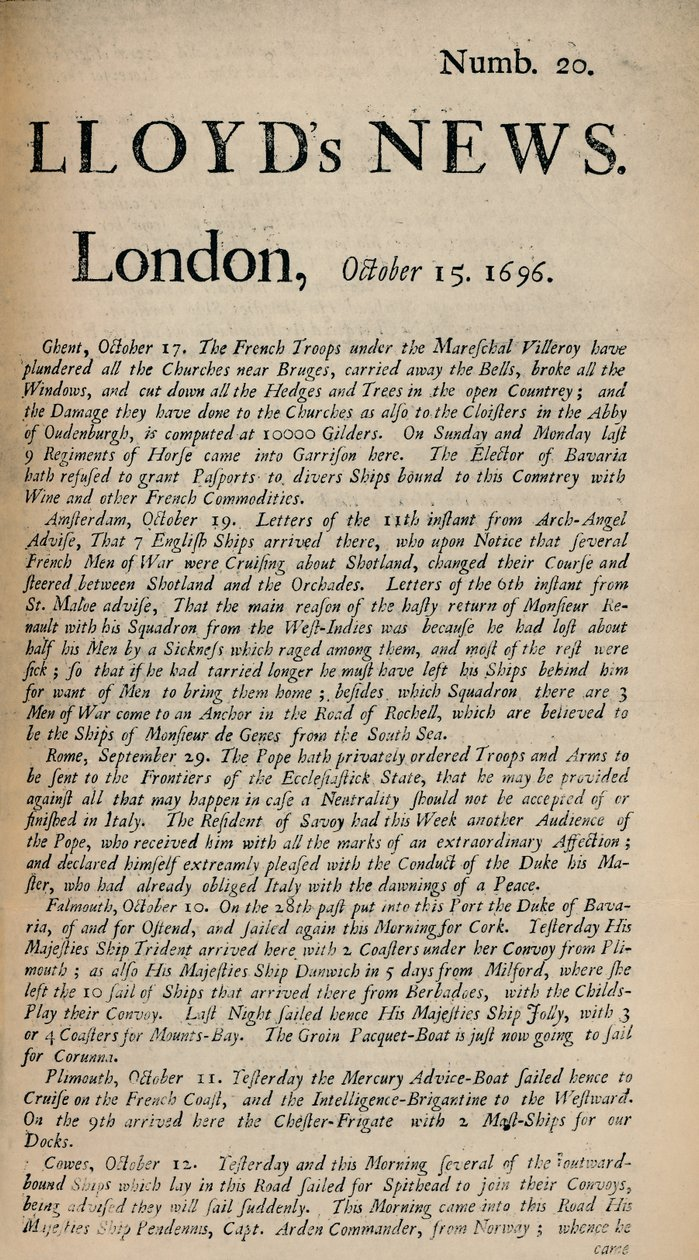
Lloyd's News from 1696

By January 1692 he was producing a weekly news-sheet, the running title of which was "Ships arrived at, and departed from several ports of England, as I have account of them in London ... [and] an account of what English shipping and foreign ships for England, I hear of in foreign ports". This was published on Saturdays until September 1699, when publication moved to Fridays; it ran until at least March 1704. In 1696 Lloyd began publishing Lloyd's News which recorded shipping movements; the news-sheet ran between September 1696 and 1698. It came to an end because of inaccurate reporting of debates in the House of Lords, which was considered at the time as a breach of parliamentary privilege.

By 1700 Lloyd's business was well known enough to be mentioned in "The Wealthy Shopkeeper and Charitable Citizen", a piece of doggerel about the daily activity of the eponymous subject:

Then to Lloyd's Coffee House he never fails
To read the letters and attend the sales.

The coffee house was also referenced in The Tatler in 1710 and The Spectator in 1711. Lloyd's name was also used as a mark of trust outside Britain: over three months of 1703 it was used fifteen times by Germans travelling to the ports of the Hanseatic League and Englishmen travelling to the West Indies "seem to have asked Lloyd to vouch for their credentials", according to the journalist Anthony Brown.

== Personal life ==
Lloyd was a churchwarden, constable and questman, an early form of community policeman. In 1698 his wife Abigail died; he then married Elizabeth Mashbourne the same year. She died in October 1712 and Lloyd was married a month later to Martha Denham. He made a new will in January 1713 in which he described himself as "weak in body though of sound and disposing mind and memory".

Lloyd died in London on 15 February 1713; his death was announced in the Flying Post news-sheet as "Died Mr Lloyd the coffee man in Lombard Street". He was buried at St Mary Woolnoth church in the City of London. A plaque to him was installed in the church in 1931.

== Legacy ==
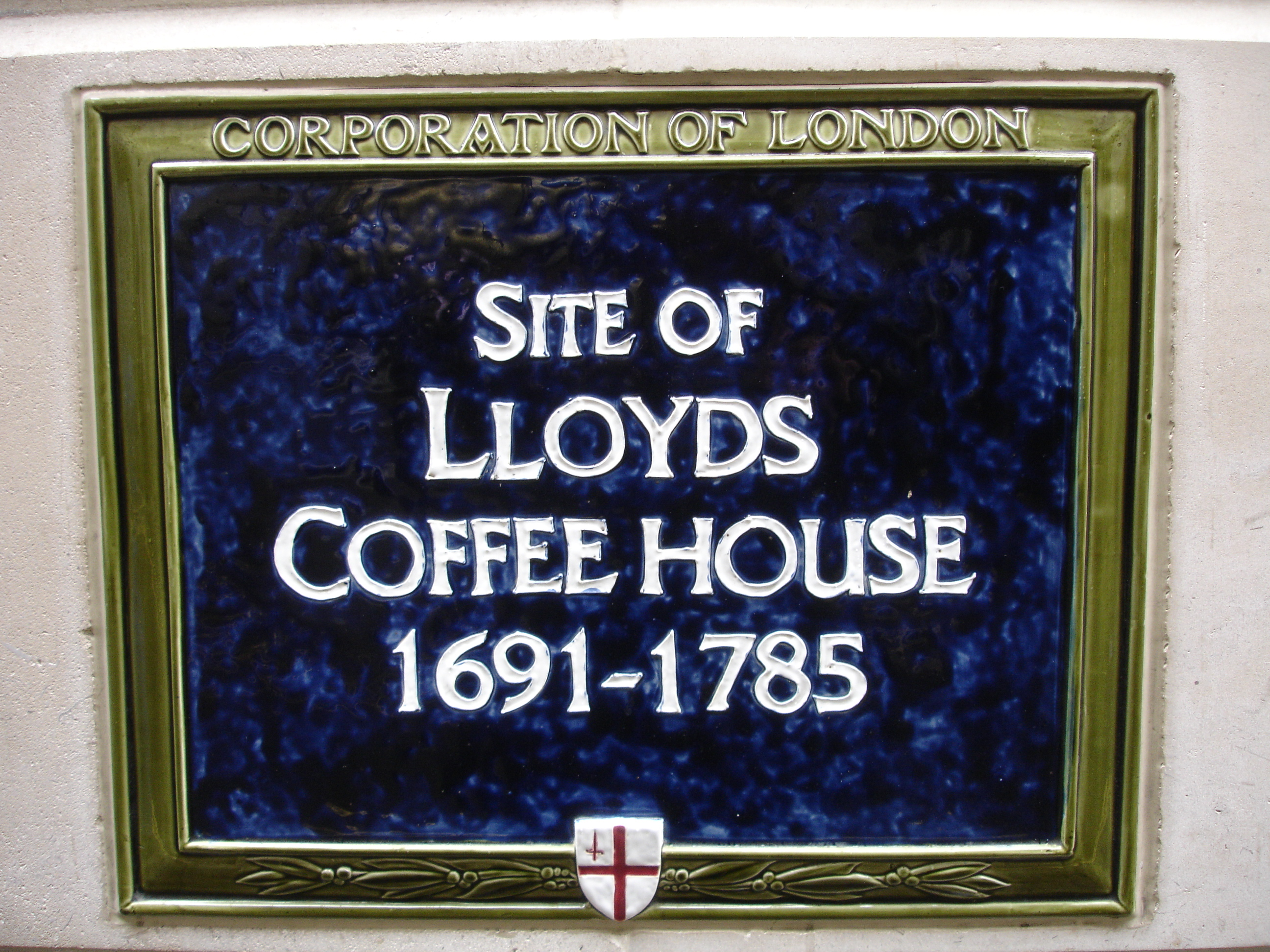
Plaque in Lombard Street, London, marking the location of Lloyd's coffee house

In January 1713 Lloyd's youngest daughter, Handy, married William Newton, who was the head waiter at the coffee house. (Note: Harding writes that Lloyd's youngest daughter was named Elinor and that she married Newton in 1695.) Lloyd left the couple the coffee house in his will. Newton died within a year of taking over the coffee house; Handy was married to Samuel Sheppard and the couple continued to run the outlet.

Sheppard was succeeded as the owner of Lloyds by Thomas Jemson in 1727. In 1734 he launched Lloyd's List, providing shipping news. As at 2025 the publication is still being produced, although it has only been available online since 2013. Also originating from the coffee house was the Lloyd's Register after a committee called the Register Society was formed by the coffee-house's clientele in 1760.

Merchants and underwriters continued to use Lloyds as a place of business until 1769 when the businessman John Julius Angerstein opened a more formal institution for trading, naming it New Lloyd's; its headquarters was in Pope's Head Alley, off Cornhill in the City of London. It was from this body that Lloyd's of London grew.

== Notes and references ==
=== Sources ===
==== Books ====
- Barriskill, D. T. (1994). A Guide to the Lloyd's Marine Collection and Related Marine Sources at Guildhall Library. London: Guildhall Library. ISBN 978-0-9004-2237-9.
- Besly, Edward (1997). Loose Change: A Guide to Common Coins and Medals. Cardiff: National Museum Wales. ISBN 978-0-7200-0444-1.
- Brown, Antony (1987). Hazard Unlimited. From Ships to Satellites: 300 years of Lloyd's of London. London: Lloyd's of London Press. ISBN 978-1-8504-4137-3.
- Flower, Raymond; Wynn-Jones, Michael (1974). Lloyd's of London; An Illustrated History. New York, Hastings House. ISBN 978-0-8038-4290-8.
- Gascoigne, Margaret (2008). Discovering English Customs and Traditions. Oxford: Shire Publications. ISBN 978-0-7478-0377-5.
- Gibb, D. E. W. (1972). Lloyd's of London: A Study in Individualism. London: The Corporation of Lloyd's. OCLC 2137458.
- Halliday, Stephen (2014). London's Markets: From Smithfield to Portobello Road. Stroud, Gloucestershire: The History Press. ISBN 978-0-7524-9448-7.
- Harding, Vanessa (1986). Lloyd's at Home. Colchester, Essex: Lloyd's of London. ISBN 978-1-8504-4114-4.
- Hodgson, Godfrey (1984). Lloyd's of London. London: Allen Lane. ISBN 978-0-6704-3595-1.
- Marcus, Geoffrey Jules (1975). Heart of Oak: A Survey of British Sea Power in the Georgian Era. Oxford University Press. ISBN 978-0-1921-5812-3.
- Millar, Stephen (2019). London's City Churches. London: Metro Publication. ISBN 978-1-9029-1061-1.

==== Journals, news and magazines ====
- Bickerstaff, Isaac (23 December 1710). "From My Own Appartment". The Tatler. Vol. 2, no. 268.
- Brooks, Sydney (March 1921). "Two Pillars of the British Merchant Marine: II: Lloyd's". The North American Review. 213 (784): 333–345. ISSN 0029-2397. JSTOR 25120698.
- Greenslade, Roy (25 September 2013). "Lloyd's List, the World's Oldest Newspaper, to Give up on Print". The Guardian.
- "Untitled". The Spectator. No. 46. 23 April 1711.

==== Websites ====
- Clark, Gregory (2025). "The Annual RPI and Average Earnings for Britain, 1209 to Present (New Series)". MeasuringWorth. Archived from the original on 1 April 2023.
- "Edward Lloyd and his Coffee House". Lloyd's Register.
- "Lloyd's at 325: The Story of Edward Lloyd". Society of Lloyd's. Archived from the original on 3 November 2014.
- "Lloyd's List". Maritime Insights & Intelligence.
- "No. 2429". The London Gazette. 21 February 1688. p. 2.
- "No. 2358". The London Gazette. 25 June 1688. p. 2.
- "No. 2482". The London Gazette. 26 August 1689. p. 2.
- "Our History". Lloyd's Register Foundation.
- Palmer, Sarah (2007). "Lloyd, Edward". Oxford Dictionary of National Biography (online ed.). Oxford University Press. doi:10.1093/ref:odnb/16829. (Subscription, Wikipedia Library access or UK public library membership required.)
