= Glyndwr Williams =

British historian (1932–2022)

Glyndwr Williams (11 March 1932 – 24 January 2022) was a professor of history at Queen Mary, University of London since 1974, specialising in the history of exploration and the history of Europe overseas. He was appointed a professor emeritus of the University of London in 1997.

== Academic career ==
Williams earned his bachelor's degree and PhD at the University of London. He became reader in history at Queen Mary College, London and was then promoted to professor. He served as general editor of the Hudson's Bay Record Society and he has been president and trustee of the Hakluyt Society.

He died 24 January 2022. He was survived by his wife and fellow maritime historian, Sarah R. Palmer, and their two children.

== Awards and honours ==
- The Caird Medal of the National Maritime Museum
- Hon. D.Litt. from La Trobe University
- National Outdoor Book Award (Honorable Mention, History/Biography category), for Arctic Labyrinth: The Quest for the Northwest Passage, 2009

== Published works ==
- Alan Frost and Jane Samson, eds., Pacific Empires: Essays in Honour of Glyndwr Williams, (Vancouver: University of British Columbia Press, 1999), pp. 271–275, contains a bibliography of "The Works of Glyndwr Williams" between 1959 and 1998.

Additional works since 1997 include:

- The Great South Sea (1997)
- The Prize of all the Oceans: The Triumph and Tragedy of Anson's Voyage Round the World (1999)
- Voyages of Delusion: The Search for the Northwest Passage in the Age of Reason (2002)
- Buccaneers, Explorers and Settlers: British Enterprise and Encounters in the Pacific, 1670-1800 (2005)
- Pioneers of the Pacific: Voyages of Exploration, 1787-1810 (2005) co-author with Nigel Rigby and Pieter van der Merwe
- The Death of Captain Cook: A Hero Made and Unmade (2008)
- Arctic Labyrinth: The Quest for the Northwest Passage (2009)
- Naturalists at Sea: Scientific Travellers from Dampier to Darwin (2013)

== Sources ==
- Contemporary Authors
- Alan Frost and Jane Samson, eds., Pacific Empires: Essays in Honour of Glyndwr Williams, (Vancouver: University of British Columbia Press, 1999)
