= Julian Corbett Prize in Naval History =

The Julian Corbett Prize in Modern Naval History was established in 1924 by Mr. H. E. Corbett in memory of his brother, the great naval historian Sir Julian Corbett (1854–1922). First awarded in 1926, the prize has been offered annually by the University of London for a piece of original research in the field of naval history.

The Institute of Historical Research at the University of London describes the prize as 'A prize of the value of £4,000 and known as the Julian Corbett Prize for Research in Modern Naval History, is available annually for award by the Academic Trust Funds Committee, on the recommendation of the Institute of Historical Research, for work not previously published and based on original (Ms. or printed) materials for Modern Naval History'.

== Julian Corbett Prize Winners ==
- 1926 James A. Williamson Notice in Bulletin of the Institute of Historical Research, vol. V, issue 14 (November 1927), p. 95.
- 1930 Lieutenant-Commander A. C. Bell, "The Third Dutch War", Summary in Bulletin of the Institute of Historical Research, vol. 9, issue 26 (November 1931), p. 109-112.
- 1932 W.G. Bassett, "English Naval Policy 1698-1703", Bulletin of the Institute of Historical Research, vol. 11, (1933–34), pp. 122–125.
- 1935 C. Northcote Parkinson, Edward Pellew, 1st Viscount Exmouth, Admiral of the Red, London: Methuen & Co., 1934.
- 1938 Admiral Sir William James, KCB.
- 1939 Admiral Sir Herbert Richmond, "The Importance of the study of Naval History". Notice in Bulletin of the Institute of Historical Research, vol. XVI (1938–1939), p. 100; published in Naval Review 27 (May 1939), 201–18, reprinted in Naval Review 68 (April 1980), 139–50.
- 1948 Commander Philip Aubrey, "Preventive Squadron: The Royal Navy and the West African Slave Trade 1811-1868". Summary in Bulletin of the Institute of Historical Research, vol. 23 (1950), pp. 90–91.
- 1949 Gordon Connel-Smith, "Forerunner of Drake: some aspects of privateering and piracy during the last French war of Henry VIII", Summary in Bulletin of the Institute of Historical Research, vol. 24 (1951), pp. 82–84. Later used in Forerunners of Drake: a study of English Trade with Spain in the early Tudor period (London, 1954).
- 1951 A. N. Ryan, "The British Expedition to Copenhagen in 1807", Summary in Bulletin of the Institute of Historical Research, vol. 25 (1952), pp. 231–232. Published as "The Causes of the British Attack upon Copenhagen, 1807", English Historical Review, vol. LXVIII (1953), pp. 37–55.
- 1952 Piers Mackesy, "The Royal Navy in the Mediterranean from Trafalgar to the Revolt in Spain, 1805-08". Summary published in Bulletin of the Institute of Historical Research, (May 1954), pp. 98–101. Later used in The War in the Mediterranean, 1803-1810 (London, 1957).
- 1954 Roy Taylor, "The Reform of the Naval Recruiting System, 1852-1862", summary in Bulletin of the Institute of Historical Research, Vol. 28, no. 77 (May 1955), p. 99. Published as "Manning the Royal Navy: the Reform of the Recruiting System, 1852-62", Mariner's Mirror, vol. XLIV (1958), pp. 302–313, and vol. XLV (1959), pp. 46–58.
- 1958 D. E. Kennedy, "Parliament and the Navy, 1642-1648," A shortened version published as "The English Naval Revolt of 1648," The English Historical Review, Vol. 77, No. 303 (Apr., 1962), pp. 247–256.
- 1965 Anthony B. Sainsbury, "Vice Admiral Sir John Duckworth and the Dardanelles,1807", Summary in Bulletin of the Institute of Historical Research, vol. 40 (1967), pp. 112–114.
- 1966 A. P. McGowan, "The Administration of the navy under the first Duke of Buckingham, Lord High Admiral of England, 1618-1628". Summary in Bulletin of the Institute of Historical Research, vol. 40 (1967), pp. 225–227.
- 1968 John Berryman, "British naval policy and the Sino-Japanese war, 1894-5". Summary in Bulletin of the Institute of Historical Research, vol. 43 (1970), pp 116–119.
- 1970 Paul M. Kennedy, "Tirpitz, England and the Second Navy Law of 1900: a strategic critique". Summary in Bulletin of the Institute of Historical Research, vol. 45 (1972), pp. 145–147.Published under the same title in Militärgeschichtliche Mitteilungen, 1970/2, pp. 33–57.
- 1970 R. J. B. Knight, "The Administration of the Royal Dockyards in England 1770-90". Summary in Bulletin of the Institute of Historical Research, vol. 45 (1972), pp. 148–150.
- 1978 Roger Morriss, "Samuel Bentham and the Management of the Royal Dockyards, 1796-1807, " in Bulletin of the Institute of Historical Research, vol. 54 (1981), pp. 226–240.
- 1982 N. A. M. Rodger, "Stragglers and Deserters from the Royal Navy during the Seven Years War", Published in Bulletin of the Institute of Historical Research, vol. 57 (1984), pp. 56–79.
- 1984 Rhodri Williams, "Arthur James Balfour, Sir John Fisher and the politics of naval reform, 1904-10". Published in Historical Research, vol. 60 (1987), pp. 80–99.
- 1986 David Davies, Pepys and the Admiralty Commission of 1679-84, in Historical Research, vol. 62 (1989), pp. 34–53.
- 1995 Patricia K. Crimmin, Letters and Documents relating to the Service of Nelson’s ships 1780-1805: a critical report, in Historical Research, vol. 70 (1997), pp. 52–69.
- 1996 Harry Dickinson, The Origins and Foundation of the Royal Naval College, Greenwich in Historical Research, vol. 72 (1999), pp. 92–111.
- 1997 Joseph A. Maiolo, "The knockout blow against the Import System: Admiralty expectations of Nazi Germany’s naval strategy 1934-9".Published in Historical Research, vol. 72 (1999), pp. 202–228.
- 1998 Philip Woodfine, "Proper Objects of the Press: Naval Impressment and Habeas Corpus in the French Revolutionary Wars", published in K. P. Dockray and K. Labourn, eds., The Representation and Reality of War: The British Experience. (Stroud: Sutton, 1999), pp. 39–60.
- 2000 Oliver Walton, Officers and Engineers, the integration and status of engineers in the Royal Navy, 1847-60. Published in Historical Research, vol. 77 (2004), pp 178–201.
- 2003 Keith A. J. McLay, Combined Operations in the European Theatre during the Nine Years War, 1688-1697, Historical Research, vol. 78 (2005), pp. 506–539.
- 2004 Nicholas A. Lambert, Strategic Command and Control for Maneuver Warfare: Creation of the Royal Navy's "War Room" System, 1905-1915, The Journal of Military History, Vol. 69, No. 2 (Apr., 2005), pp. 361–410.
- 2005 Christopher Martin, The Declaration of London: a Matter of Operational Capability. Published in Historical Research, vol. 82 (2009), pp. 731–755.
- 2006 Anthony J. Cumming, Did the Navy win the Battle of Britain? The Warship as the Ultimate Guarantor of Britain’s Freedom in 1940. Published in Historical Research, vol. 83 (2010), pp. 165–188.
- 2007 Matthew S. Seligmann, A Prelude to the Reforms of Admiral Sir John Fisher: the creation of the Home Fleet, 1902-1903. Published in Historical Research, vol. 83 (2010), pp. 506–19.
- 2008 Erica Charters, 'The intention is noble': the Western Squadron, Medical Trials and the Sick and Hurt Board during the Seven Years War (1756-63).
- 2009 Derek L. Elliott, Pirates, Polities, and Companies: Global Politics Along the Konkan Littoral, c. 1690-1756. Published in London School of Economics Working Papers Series as No. 136 at http://www.lse.ac.uk/collections/economicHistory/pdf/WP136.pdf.
- 2010 Gareth Atkins, The politics of influence and the influence of politics: Evangelicals and the Royal Navy, 1778-1815.
- 2012 Melanie Holihead, Portsea Poll, poor Poll? The social condition of wives and families receiving allotments of pay from Royal Navy sailors in mid-nineteenth century Portsea Town
- 2015 Tim Benbow, "The Royal Navy and Sea Power in British Strategy, 1945-1955," Published in Historical Research, vol. 91, issue 252 (May 20180, pp. 375–398.
- 2018 Evan Wilson, "Naval Defence of Ireland during the French Revolutionary and Napoleonic Wars." Published in Historical Research, vol. 92, issue 257 (August 2019), pp. 568–589.
- 2025 Callum Easton, "A Matter of ‘Good Usage’: Towards a New Interpretation of the 1797 Fleet Mutinies at Spithead and the Nore" Published in Historical Research, vol. 99, issue 285 (August 2026), pp. 423–442.

== See also ==
- List of history awards

== External Source ==
- Current University of London Announcement of the Annual Competition

== Sources ==
- Publications of the Institute of Historical Research, University of London
