= A. W. H. Pearsall =

British naval and railway historian

Alan William Halliday Pearsall ISO, (14 November 1925 in Leeds – 31 March 2006 in London) was a naval and railway historian, who served for thirty years from 1955 to 1985 on the staff of the National Maritime Museum, Greenwich.

== Early life and education ==
The eldest son of William Harold Pearsall, (1891–1964), FRS, and professor of freshwater biology at Sheffield University and Manchester University, and his wife Marjorie Williamson, a lecturer in botany, was born at Leeds, while his parents were both lecturers at the University of Leeds. Illness prevented him from attending school between the years of 9 and 13. On completing Grammar School at Morecambe in 1942, he volunteered to join the Royal Navy as a 17-year-old and served in India. After demobilisation and a year of recovery from tropical illness, Pearsall went on to Trinity Hall, Cambridge, where he read history. Completing his degree, he began graduate work in naval history under Professor Gerald S. Graham at King's College London, but did not complete his doctorate.

== Professional career ==
Encouraged by Graham, Pearsall took a position as a general assistant at the National Maritime Museum in 1955, rising to become Curator of Manuscripts in the 1960s, and then Historian, before he retired in 1985. On his retirement, he was appointed to the Imperial Service Order in recognition of his wide-ranging knowledge of five centuries of British naval history and, as one obituarist characterised it, "his extraordinary value as adviser, teacher and scholarly oracle to colleagues at Greenwich, and to the wider specialist communities and information-seeking public that the museum serves". Although he published no major single work of his own, he published a variety of authoritative articles informed by his deep knowledge of archival materials. Most importantly, his scholarly and informative advice was acknowledged in hundreds of works written by three generations of naval historians.

Pearsall was a member of numerous learned organisations associated with his passionate interests in British naval history, railway history, and fortifications. His most important work, however, was done in connection with the Navy Records Society, which he served as a member of Council and as vice president, as well as editing 80 pages of documents on the nineteenth century in the Society's Centenary volume published in 1993. In addition, he contributed numerous articles to the Oxford Dictionary of National Biography (2004).

== Published works ==
- North Irish channel services Pamphlet (1962)
- North Irish transport Six Pamphlets
- The Second Dutch War: de tweede Engelse oorlog 1665-1667 Pamphlet (1967).
- 'British convoys in the North Sea 1781-1782' Article
- 'The Bombardment of Acre, November 3, 1840,' Sefunin, vol 2 (1967-8), pp. 50–55
- Shipping: a survey of historical records. Edited by Peter Mathias and A. W. H. Pearsall (1971).
- 'Bomb vessels', Polar Record, vol 16 (1973), pp. 781–83.
- Nicholas Pocock 1741-1821 : a selection of his marine works from the collections of the National Maritime Museum Pamphlet (1975)
- Old postcard views from the Walter Dowsett collection : No 1 River Thames Coauthor (1976)
- Old postcard views from the Walter Dowsett collection : the rivers and coast of East Anglia Coauthor (1983)
- 'Lord Anson: Sailor-Statesman or Not?', in Abigail T. Siddall, ed., Actes du 7e Colloque Internationale d'histoire Militaire, (1984), pp. 270–79.
- 'Naval Aspects of the Landings on the French Coast, 1758', in N. A. M. Rodger, ed., Naval Miscellany, volume 5 Publications of the Navy Records Society, (1985), pp. 207–243.
- 'The Royal Navy and Trade Protection, 1688–1714,' Renaissance and Modern Studies, vol. 30 (1989), pp. 109–23.
- 'Some aspects of Irish maritime history', RSA J, Vol. 138 (1990), pp. 843–845
- The Holyhead steamers of the L. & N. W. R. (1991)
- British Naval Documents 1204-1960, Publications of the Navy Records Society, Vol. 131 (1993), edited by John B. Hattendorf, R. J. B. Knight, A.W.H. Pearsall, N. A. M. Rodger, and Geoffrey Till.
- Oxford Dictionary of National Biography (2004), wrote or revised the biographies of the following individuals:
  - Sir Richard Bickerton, 1st Baronet (1727–1792), naval officer
  - Thomas Brodrick (1704–1769), naval officer
  - Thomas Coppack (1895–1981), shipowner
  - Andrew Douglas (d. 1725), naval officer
  - Sir William George Fairfax 1739–1813), naval officer
  - Sir Thomas Frankland, 5th Baronet (1718–1784), naval officer and politician
  - Samuel Graves (1713–1787), naval officer
  - Richard Green (1803–1863), shipowner and philanthropist
  - Alexander Hood (1758–1798), naval officer
  - William Locker (1731–1800), naval officer
  - William Martin (c. 1696–1756), naval officer
  - Perry Mayne (c. 1700–1761), naval officer
  - Sir Edmund Nagle (1757–1830), naval officer
  - Henry Osborn, (bap. 1694, d. 1771), naval officer
  - Baker Philipps (c. 1718–1745), naval officer
  - Sir Richard Pearson (1731–1806), naval officer
  - Lord Hugh Seymour, (1759–1801), naval officer
  - Charles Watson (1714–1757), naval officer.
