= Geoffrey Till =

Geoffrey Till OBE FKC
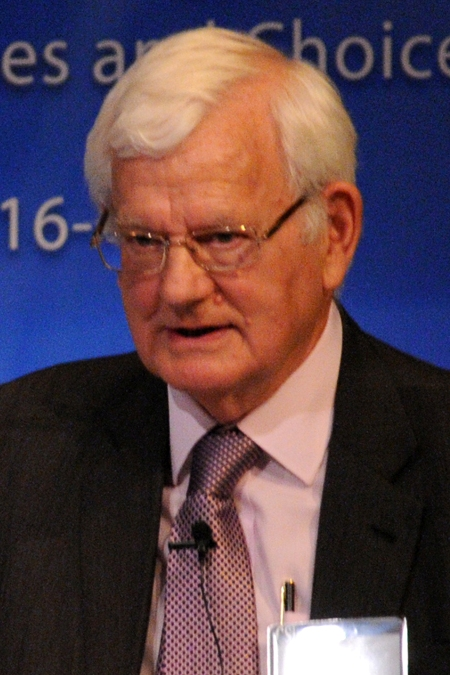
- Geoffrey Till in 2014
- Born: 14 January 1945 (age 81); London, England

Academic work
- Main interests: Maritime history Military historian (History of warfare)

Geoffrey Till OBE FKC (born in London, England, on 14 January 1945) is a British naval historian and emeritus professor of maritime studies in the Defence Studies Department of King's College London. He is the director of the Corbett Centre for Maritime Policy Studies.

== Early life and education ==
The son of Arthur Till, a Royal Air Force officer, and Violet Till, Geoffrey Till studied at King's College London, where he received his B.A. in 1966. Then, he went on to complete his MA in 1968 and PhD in 1976 within the Department of War Studies, King's College London.

== Academic career ==
His first academic appointments were at the Britannia Royal Naval College, Dartmouth, and the Department of Systems Science at the City University, London. In 1983, he was appointed visiting lecturer at King's College London and in 1989, he was appointed professor of history at the Royal Naval College, Greenwich, also teaching at the Open University. On a NATO Defence Fellowship, he was a visiting scholar at the United States Naval Postgraduate School, Monterey, California. In 1989, Till held the Foundation Chair in Military Affairs at the United States Marine Corps University, Quantico, Virginia.

With the closure of the Royal Naval College, Greenwich, Till moved to the Joint Services Command and Staff College, where he served as the Dean of Academic Studies, a position he held concurrently with his King's College London chair and headship of the Department of the Defence Studies Department, until September 2006, when he received a Fellowship of King's College London.

He has also been visiting professor at the Armed Forces University, Taiwan and senior visiting research fellow at the Institute of Defence and Strategic Studies, Singapore. He is also a member of council of the Royal United Services Institute. In 2018, the U.S. Naval War College appointed him Dudley W. Knox Distinguished Visiting Professor of Naval History and Maritime Strategy in the college's Hattendorf Historical Center.

He has written extensively on maritime history and strategy. Till has been reviews editor for the Journal of Strategic Studies since it was launched in 1978, general editor of Brassey’s Seapower: Naval Vessels, Weapons Systems and Technology series since 1987, contributing its first volume on modern sea power, and general series editor of the Frank Cass series on naval policy and history. He sits on the executive committee of the University of Haifa's Maritime Policy & Strategy Research Center.

== Honours and awards ==
In September 2014, the Royal Swedish Society of Naval Sciences elected him a Corresponding Member.

In 2018, The U.S. Naval War College selected Till as the 2018 Hattendorf Prize Laureate.

Till was appointed Officer of the Order of the British Empire (OBE) in the 2023 New Year Honours for services to defence.

== Bibliography ==
- Air Power and the Royal Navy, 1914-1945: a historical survey. London [etc.] : Macdonald and Jane's, 1979.
- Maritime Strategy and the Nuclear Age by Geoffrey Till, with contributions from John Hattendorf ... [et al.]. London : Macmillan, 1982,1984; New York: St. Martins Press, 1984.
- The Sea in Soviet Strategy by Bryan Ranft and Geoffrey Till. London: Macmillan, 1983; 1989.
- The Future of British Sea Power, edited by Geoffrey Till. London: Macmillan, 1984.
- The Strategy of Seapower by Stephen Roskill with Geoffrey Till editor and author of the revision. London: John Goodchild, 1986.
- Modern Sea Power: An Introduction London: Brassey's Defence, 1987.
- Britain and NATO's Northern Flank, edited by Geoffrey Till. Basingstoke: Macmillan, 1988.
- East-West Relations in the 1990s: The Naval Dimension, edited by John Pay and Geoffrey Till. London: Pinter, 1990.
- British Naval Documents 1204-1960 eds. J. B. Hattendorf, R.J.B. Knight, A. W. H. Pearsall, N. A. M. Rodger, G. Till, Capt. A. B. Sainsbury, Navy Records Society (1993).
- Coastal Forces by Barry Clarke, Jurgen Fielitz & Malcolm Touchin; edited by Geoffrey Till; with a foreword by Sir Julian Oswald. London: Brassey's (UK), 1994.
- Sea Power: Theory and Practice, edited by Geoffrey Till. London: Frank cass, 1994.
- Amphibious Operations: A Collection of Papers by Geoffrey Till, Mark J. Grove and Theo Farrell. Camberley: Strategic and Combat Studies Institute, 1997.
- Challenges of High Command in the Twentieth Century, edited by Gary Sheffield and Geoffrey Till. Camberley: Strategic and Combat Studies Institute, 2000; Basingstoke: Palgrave Macmillan, 2003.
- Seapower at the Millennium, edited by Geoffrey Till. Stroud: Sutton, 2001.
- Seapower: A Guide for the Twenty-First Century. London: Frank Cass, 2004; Routledge, 2009, 2013, 2018.
- The Development of British Naval Thinking: Essays in Memory of Bryan Ranft, edited by Geoffrey Till. London: Routledge, 2006.
- Naval transformation, ground forces, and the expeditionary impulse : the sea-basing debate Carlisle, PA : Strategic Studies Institute, U.S. Army War College, [2006]; [Washington, D.C.] : Strategic Studies Institute, [2006].
- Globalisation and Defence in the Asia-Pacific, edited by Geoffrey Till, Emrys Chew, and Joshua Ho. London: Routledge, 2007.
- The Rise of Naval Power in Asia-Pacific, edited by Geoffrey Till. London: Routledge: Adelphi series, 2012.
- Sea power and the Asia-Pacific : the triumph of Neptune? edited by Geoffrey Till and Patrick C. Bratton. London: Routledge, 2012.
- The real "long war" : the illicit drug trade and the role of the military Carlisle, Pennsylvania: Strategic Studies Institute and U.S. Army War College Press, 2013.
- A new type of great power relationship between the United States and China: the military dimension Carlisle Barracks, PA : Strategic Studies Institute and U.S. Army War College Press, 2014.
- Understanding victory : naval operations from Trafalgar to the Falklands Santa Barbara, CA: Praeger, [2014].
- Naval modernisation in South-East Asia : nature, causes and consequences edited by Geoffrey Till and Jane Chan. Abingdon, Oxon : Routledge, [2014].
- The changing maritime scene in Asia : rising tensions and future strategic stability, edited by Geoffrey Till. Basingstoke: Palgrave Macmillan, 2015.
- International order at sea : how it is challenged, how it is maintained Jo Inge Bekkevold, Geoffrey Till, editors. London: Palgrave Macmillan, 2016.
- Asia's naval expansion : an arms race in the making? London: Routledge, 2017.
- "History, truth decay, and the naval profession". The Hattendorf Prize Lecture, 2018. Naval War College Review. 72 (4): 5–20. Autumn 2019.
- How to Grow a Navy: The Development of Maritime Power London: Routledge, 2022.
- Maritime Cooperation and Security in the Indo-Pacific Region: Essays in Honour of Sam Bateman, edited by John F. Bradford, Jane Chan, Stuart Kaye, Clive Schofield, and Geoffrey Till. Leiden: Brill, 2022.
- Recovering Naval Power: Henry Maydman and the Revival of the Royal Navy, edited by John B. Hattendorf and Geoffrey Till. London: Routledge, 2023,
