= Fireship (song) =

"Fireship" (alternatively titled "The Fire Ship", "The Fireship", or "Dark and Rolling Eye") is a risqué variation of the song "Roving Kind".

The original song, first recorded by the Weavers, told a story of a sailor meeting an attractive girl who agrees to walk out with him, but the evening takes an unpleasant turn. The lyrics are filled with seafaring metaphors. The girl is called a pirate ship who makes him walk the plank.

Not quite a parody, "Fireship" begins the same way and tells a similar story, but the lyrics are more adult-oriented and sexually suggestive. The girl in this version seems to be a prostitute who robs the unfortunate sailor. The girl is called, not a pirate ship, but a fireship, referencing the old naval war tool, the fireship, which was set on fire and let loose among enemy ships. There are variations on the lyrics, but the song ends with the sailor discovering that the encounter has left him with a "fire down below" or a "burning in the mast."

"Fireship" has been recorded by The Whiskey Bards, Pyrates Royale, The Spinners, and Jerry Bryant
