= Barry S. Strauss =

Jewish American historian (born 1953)

- Born: November 27, 1953 (age 72)
- Education: Cornell University (BA); Yale University (PhD)
- Occupation: Historian
- Website: barrystrauss.com

Barry S. Strauss (born November 27, 1953) is an American historian. He is a professor of history and humanistic studies at Cornell University, and a visiting Corliss Page Dean Fellow at the Hoover Institution.

== Life and work ==
Strauss is an expert on ancient military history and has written or edited numerous books, including The Battle of Salamis (2004), The Trojan War (2006), The Spartacus War (2009), Masters of Command (2013), The Death of Caesar (2015), Ten Caesars (2019), and The War That Made The Roman Empire (March 2022). His books have been translated into nineteen languages.

Strauss holds a B.A. from Cornell and a Ph.D. from Yale (advised by Donald Kagan) and has been awarded fellowships by the National Endowment for the Humanities, the American School of Classical Studies at Athens, the American Academy in Rome, the MacDowell Colony for the Arts, the Korea Foundation, and the Killam Foundation of Canada. He is an honorary citizen of Salamis, Greece. Strauss is director of Cornell's Program on Freedom and Free Societies and past director of its Peace Studies Program. At Cornell, he teaches courses on the history of ancient Greece, war and peace in the ancient world, history of battle, introduction to military history, and specialized topics in ancient history.

Strauss is editor of Turning Points in Ancient History, a series of books from Princeton University Press. He sits on the editorial boards of MHQ: The Quarterly Journal of Military History, Historically Speaking: The Bulletin of the Historical Society, The International Journal of the Classical Tradition, and Strategika.

Strauss is an avid rower. In 1999, he published Rowing Against the Current: On Learning to Scull at Forty (Scribner). He has appeared in more than a dozen television documentaries. He has published op-ed pieces in The Wall Street Journal, The Washington Post, the Los Angeles Times, USA Today, and Newsday, been interviewed on NPR and the BBC, and has been quoted on the front page of The Wall Street Journal and in other major newspapers.

In 2026, The U.S. Naval War College awarded him the Hattendorf Prize for Distinguished Original Research in Maritime History.

He lives in Ithaca, New York.

== Books ==
Author or co-author

- Athens After the Peloponnesian War: Class, Faction, and Policy, 403–386 B.C. (1987); Cornell University Press.
- The Anatomy of Error: Ancient Military Disasters and Their Lessons for Modern Strategists (1990); Co-author: Josiah Ober.
- Fathers and Sons in Athens: Ideology and Society in the Era of the Peloponnesian War (1993); Princeton University Press.
- Rowing Against the Current: On Learning to Scull at Forty (1999); Scribner
- The Battle of Salamis: The Naval Encounter That Saved Greece—and Western Civilization (2004); Simon & Schuster
- The Trojan War: A New History (2006); Simon & Schuster.
- The Spartacus War (2009); Simon & Schuster.
- Western Civilization, Beyond Boundaries, Volume 2: Since 1560 (6th edition, 2009); with Thomas F. X. Noble, Duane Osheim, Kristen Neuschel, Elinor Accampo, David D. Roberts, and William B. Cohen.
- Masters of Command: Alexander, Hannibal, Caesar, and the Genius of Leadership (2012); Simon & Schuster.
- The Death of Caesar: The Story of History's Most Famous Assassination (2015); Simon & Schuster
- Ten Caesars : Roman Emperors from Augustus to Constantine (2019); Simon & Schuster
- The War that Made the Roman Empire: Antony, Cleopatra, and Octavian at Actium (2022); Simon & Schuster
- Jews vs. Rome: Two Centuries of Rebellion Against the World's Mightiest Empire (2025); Simon & Schuster

Editor or co-editor

- Hegemonic Rivalry: From Thucydides to the Nuclear Age (1991; Series: New Approaches to Peace and Security); Co-edited with Richard Ned Lebow.
- War and Democracy: A Comparative Study of the Korean War and the Peloponnesian War (2001), East Gate Books. Co-edited with David R. McCann.
