= Nicholas A. M. Rodger =

English historian

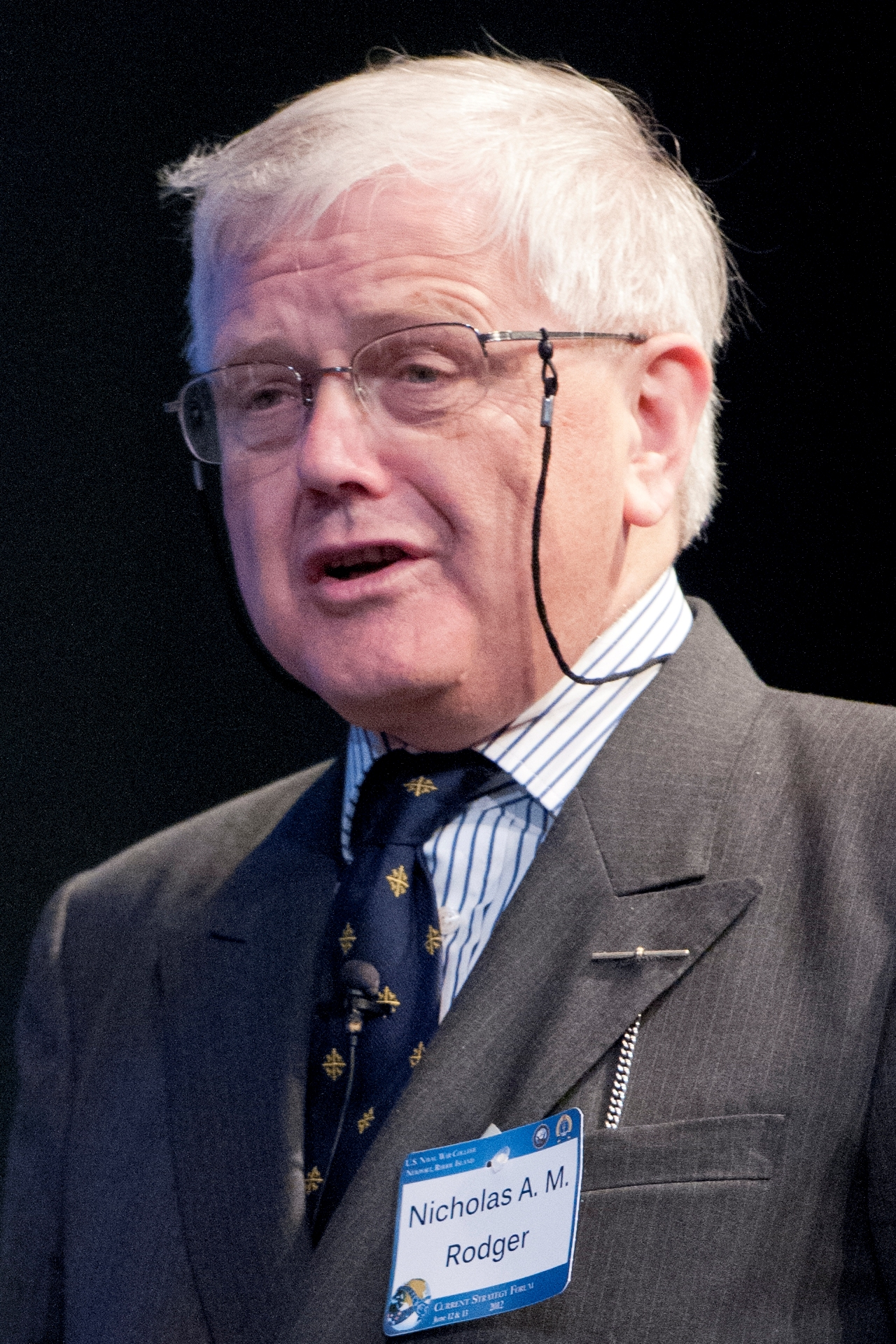
Rodger in 2012

Nicholas Andrew Martin Rodger, FSA, FRHistS, FBA (born 12 November 1949) is an English historian who is currently Emeritus Fellow of All Souls College, Oxford.

== Life and academia ==
The son of Lieutenant Commander Ian Alexander Rodger, Royal Navy, of Arundel, Sussex, and Sara Mary, née Perceval, Rodger was educated at Ampleforth College and University College, Oxford, where he earned his D.Phil. degree in 1974 with a thesis titled Naval policy and cruiser design, 1865–1890. He served for seventeen years at the Public Record Office as an assistant keeper of public records, 1974–1991. After resigning from the public service, he began a Naval History of Britain with the support of the National Maritime Museum, the Navy Records Society and the Society for Nautical Research. The museum gave him the title of Anderson Senior Research Fellow, 1992–1998. In 1999, he moved to the University of Exeter as senior lecturer, and the following year was appointed professor of naval history. In 2007, he was elected a senior research fellow of All Souls College, Oxford. He served as honorary secretary of the Navy Records Society from 1976 to 1990. He is also a member and fellow of the Society of Antiquaries of London (1985) and a fellow of the Royal Historical Society (1980). He was elected as a Fellow of the British Academy in 2003. In 2015 he was made a fellow of the Society for Nautical Research.

== Awards and honours ==
Rodger has been awarded the Julian Corbett Prize in Naval History. His book The Admiralty was chosen by the US Naval Institute as one of the best books of the 1980s. He received the Duke of Westminster's Medal for Military Literature in 2005 and was also the winner of the 2005 British Academy Book Prize. In 2011, he was named the first Hattendorf Prize Laureate.

== Works ==
N. A. M. Rodger's main works include:

- The Admiralty (1979)
- Articles of War: The Statutes which Governed Our Fighting Navies, 1661, 1749, and 1886 (1982)
- The Naval Miscellany, vol. 5, Navy Records Society (1983)
- The Wooden World: An Anatomy of the Georgian Navy (1986)
- Naval Records for Genealogists (1984, 1988, 1998)
- The Armada in the Public Records (1988)
- Navies and Armies: The Anglo-Dutch relationship in War and Peace 1688–1988 eds. G. J. A. Raven & N. A. M. Rodger; assist ed. M. C. F. van Drunen (1990)
- The Insatiable Earl: A Life of John Montagu, Fourth Earl of Sandwich, 1718–1792 (1993)
- British Naval Documents 1204–1960 eds. J. B. Hattendorf, R. J. B. Knight, A. W. H. Pearsall, N. A. M. Rodger, G. Till, Capt. A. B. Sainsbury, Navy Records Society (1993)
- Naval Power in the Twentieth Century (1996)
- The Safeguard of the Sea: A Naval History of Britain, Volume 1, 660–1649 (1997)
- The Command of the Ocean: A Naval History of Britain, Volume 2, 1649–1815 (2004)
- A Guide to the Naval Records in the National Archives of the UK, ed. by Randolph Cock and N. A. M. Rodger (2006)
- Essays in Naval History, from Medieval to Modern (2009)
- Strategy and the Sea: Essays in Honour of John B. Hattendorf, ed. by N. A. M. Rodger, J. Ross Dancy, Benjamin Darnell, and Evan Wilson (2016)
- The Price of Victory: A Naval History of Britain, Volume 3, 1814–1945 (2024)
