= The Devil to Pay (Parkinson novel) =

1973 novel by Cyril Northcote Parkinson

First edition (publ. John Murray)

The Devil to Pay is one of a series of nautical novels by C. Northcote Parkinson. It is set in the late 18th Century, when Britain was at war with Revolutionary France. Parkinson's hero is a junior naval officer. Unlike many fictional officers, Parkinson's hero, Richard Delancey, does not have any powerful patrons to ease his way to promotion.

The novel starts with Delancey accepting the temporary command of a small cutter. Delancey is from the Island of Guernsey, and is fluent in French. His knowledge of French will make it easier for him to land Royalist agents who are part of a plan to prepare for an invasion to restore the French monarchy.

This secret mission appears to have been a failure. And it leaves Delancey on the beach, living on his half-pay.

So he leaps at a chance to accept the temporary command of a small customs vessel. He is unexpectedly successful at intercepting smuggled goods so one of the owners of some of the smuggling vessels offers him the much better position of command of a privateer.

He is a successful privateer commander. He has several successful cruises. But, eventually his ship is wrecked on the enemy shore. Delancey and some of his remaining crew decide to try to escape back to England. During their escape Delancey acquires some valuable intelligence.

With the aid of a smuggler who works for his boss he is able to make contact with an RN frigate cruising offshore. The Captain of that vessel mounts an expedition to rescue Delancey and recover the secret papers. One of his lieutenants is lost. And Delancey is offered to take his place.

The novel ends with Delancey again serving in the Royal Navy.

It is believed that the phrase The Devil to Pay refers to the task of caulking, or paying, the deck seams with hot pitch. The outermost seam—between the deck and the hull—is the hardest to caulk. It is called the devil. The full phrase is The devil to pay, and no pitch hot—more generally the phrase is used to refer to any urgent, desperate situation. However this has been disputed in numerous sources and WorldWideWords.com references the phrase as:

"It’s more probable that the phrase was a reference to a Faustian bargain, a pact with Satan, and to the inevitable payment to be made to him in the end. Its earliest appearances at about the beginning of the eighteenth century certainly have no hint of a naval origin or context. Here’s an example written by Jonathan Swift in 1738: 'I must be with my Wife on Tuesday, or there will be the Devil and all to pay'."

This novel was the first Parkinson wrote. The next novel in the series is The Fireship. Parkinson later went back and wrote a prequel, The Guernseyman, set during the American Revolution.
