= Norman Friedman =

American naval historian (born 1946)

- Born: 1946 (age 79–80)
- Education: Columbia University
- Occupations: Author, analyst, strategist, historian
- Writing career
- Period: 1946–present
- Subjects: Naval historical analysis and strategy

Norman Friedman (born 1946) is an American author, analyst, strategist, and historian. He has written more than 30 books and numerous articles on naval and other military matters, has worked for the U.S. Navy and Marine Corps, and has appeared on television programs including PBS, the Discovery Channel, C-SPAN, and National Geographic.

== Background ==
Friedman holds a bachelor's degree and a doctorate from Columbia University in theoretical physics, completing his dissertation Additional Scattering of Bloch Electrons by Simultaneous Imputity and Lattice Interaction in 1974. From 1973 to 1984, he was at the Hudson Institute, becoming Deputy Director for National Security Affairs. He then worked for the United States Navy as in-house consultant. From 2002 to 2004, he served as a futurologist for the United States Marine Corps. He has held the position of Visiting Professor of Operations Research, University College, University of London.

== Awards and honors ==
- Fifty-Year War: Conflict and Strategy in the Cold War won the 2001 Duke of Westminster's Medal for Military Literature for the best military history book of 2000 from the British Royal United Services Institute.
- Seapower as Strategy: Navies and National Interests won the 2002 Samuel Eliot Morison Award for Naval Literature

== Selected bibliography ==
- —; Baker, A. D. III; Raven, Alan (1984). U.S. Cruisers: An Illustrated Design History (First ed.). Naval Institute Press. ISBN 978-1682477595. LCCN 84014767. OCLC 12502364. OL 2852386M – via the Internet Archive.
- — (1 September 1991). "The Future Shape of the U. S. Navy". The Annals of the American Academy of Political and Social Science. 517 (1). American Academy of Political and Social Science: 106–119. doi:10.1177/0002716291517001008. eISSN 1552-3349. ISSN 0002-7162. JSTOR 1047189. OCLC 1479265. S2CID 145473559.
- — (15 May 2006). The Naval Institute Guide to World Naval Weapon Systems (5th ed.). Annapolis, Maryland: Naval Institute Press. ISBN 978-1557502629. LCCN 2005031194. OCLC 1131518158. OL 3415017M – via Google Books.
- U.S. Amphibious Ships and Craft: An Illustrated Design History, ISBN 978-1-55750-250-6
- U.S. Aircraft Carriers: An Illustrated Design History, ISBN 0-87021-739-9
- U.S. Battleships: An Illustrated Design History, ISBN 978-0-87021-715-9
- U.S. Small Combatants, Including PT Boats, Subchasers, and the Brown-Water Navy: An Illustrated Design History, ISBN 978-0-87021-713-5
- U.S. Naval Weapons, ISBN 978-0-85177-240-0
- U.S. Naval Weapons: Every Gun, Missile, Mine and Torpedo Used by the U.S. Navy from 1883 to the Present Day, ISBN 978-0-87021-735-7
- Naval Radar, ISBN 978-0-87021-967-2
- American and British Aircraft Carrier Development, 1919–1941, ISBN 978-1-59114-380-2
- Battleship Design and Development 1905–1945, ISBN 978-0-83170-700-2
- Modern Warship: Design and Development, ISBN 978-0-83176-082-3
- Submarine Design and Development, ISBN 978-0-87021-954-2
- Seapower as Strategy: Navies and National Interests, ISBN 978-1-55750-291-9
- The US Maritime Strategy, ISBN 978-0-71060-500-9
- Postwar Naval Revolution, ISBN 978-0-85177-414-5
- Fifty-Year War: Conflict and Strategy in the Cold War, ISBN 978-1-59114-287-4
- Desert Victory: The War for Kuwait, ISBN 978-1-55750-254-4
- Terrorism, Afghanistan, and America's New Way of War, ISBN 978-1-59114-290-4
- Naval Firepower: Battleship Guns and Gunnery in the Dreadnought Era, ISBN 978-1-59114-555-4
- Naval Weapons of World War One: Guns, Torpedoes, Mines and ASW Weapons of All Nations, ISBN 978-1-84832-100-7
- Network-Centric Warfare: How Navies Learned to Fight Smarter Through Three World Wars, ISBN 978-1-59114-286-7
- British Carrier Aviation: The Evolution of the Ships and Their Aircraft, ISBN 978-0-87021-054-9
- The British Battleship: 1906–1946, ISBN 978-1-84832-225-7
- British Cruisers of the Victorian Era, ISBN 978-1-84832-099-4
- British Cruisers: Two World Wars and After, ISBN 978-1-84832-078-9
- British Destroyers: From Earliest Days to the Second World War, ISBN 978-1-84832-049-9
- British Destroyers and Frigates: The Second World War and After, ISBN 978-1-84832-015-4
- Fighting the Great War at Sea: Strategy, Tactics and Technology, ISBN 978-1-84832-189-2

== See also ==
- Naval History (magazine)
