= Richard Delancey =

Fictional character

Richard Delancey is the hero of a series of novels by historian C. Northcote Parkinson. Delancey is a citizen of the Island of Guernsey who rises, through merit, through the Royal Navy, during its late 18th-century wars with America and France.

According to Charles K. Rowley, during his retirement, in Guernsey, Parkinson lived on a street named after Richard Delancey, a military officer who served under the 1st Duke of Wellington, and who died during the Battle of Waterloo.

James A. Winnefeld, writing in the Naval War College Review, wrote that Parkinson had "the naval historian's eye and ear for time and place". However, he said his characters were "wooden".

Published	Set	Title
1982	1776	The Guernseyman
1973	1793	The Devil to Pay
1975	1797	The Fireship
1977	1799	Touch and Go
1978		Dead Reckoning
1981		So Near, So Far
