= Lloyd's List =

British shipping journal

- Founded: 1734; 292 years ago
- Website: www.lloydslist.com

Lloyd's List is one of the world's oldest continuously running journals, having provided weekly shipping news in London as early as 1734. It was published daily until 2013 (when the final print issue, number 60,850, was published), and is now published digitally.

Also known simply as The List, it was begun by Edward Lloyd, the proprietor of Lloyd's Coffee House, as a source of information for merchants' agents and insurance underwriters who met regularly in his establishment on Lombard Street to negotiate insurance coverage for trading vessels. It continues to provide this information in addition to marine insurance, offshore energy, logistics, market data, research, global trade and law information, and shipping news.

== History ==
The earliest form of Lloyd's List was estimated by some to have begun by 1692. One historian, Michael Palmer, wrote that: "No later than January 1692, Lloyd began publishing a weekly newsletter, 'Ships Arrived at and Departed from several Ports of England, as I have Account of them in London... [and] An Account of what English Shipping and Foreign Ships for England, I hear of in Foreign Ports'". Around that time, Lloyd’s News was published three times a week with no particular emphasis on shipping from 1696 to 1697. However, claims that Lloyd's List is the oldest continuously published newspaper in the world are disputed. The World Association of Newspapers lists several earlier, extant titles.

Thomas Jemson inherited Lloyd's Coffee House in 1727 and founded the Lloyd's List that is known today when he launched a weekly shipping intelligence publication. Publication was weekly until March 1735, then twice weekly, on Tuesdays and Fridays, according to Palmer.

In 1769, the coffee house moved to Pope's Head Alley and from there, the new Lloyd’s List began, according to Lloyd's Register. The paper was published every day except Sundays from 1 July 1837. In July 1884, Lloyd's List merged with the Shipping and Mercantile Gazette.

Lloyd's List has spawned several spin-off titles, including sister title Insurance Day.

In 2009, Lloyd's List went through a major re-design that encompassed both the masthead and the newspaper itself. Between 2011 and 2017, a Lloyd’s List operated a mobile app. Beginning in 2013, Lloyd's List was published in digital format only, as it was found that fewer than 2% of customers used the print version.

In 2022, Informa sold Lloyd's List to Montagu Private Equity. The business was then reorganised as Maritime Insights & Intelligence Limited.
