= Naval War College Distinguished Graduate Leadership Award =

The Naval War College Distinguished Graduate leadership Award was established in 1996 by the Trustees of the Naval War College Foundation to honor United States Naval War College graduates who have attained positions of prominence in the field of national security.

== Criteria ==
The criteria for selection of the Distinguished Graduate include attainment of a position of senior leadership in government service, career accomplishments which are inspiring to Naval War College students, and an expressed interest in professional military education. His graduation from the Naval War College and exemplary service in the United States Army are marks of professionalism which this award is intended to recognize.

- 2022: The Honorable Carlos Del Toro, Class of 1996, Secretary of the Navy
- 2021: Admiral Charles A. Richard, Class of 2000, Commander, U.S. Strategic Command
- 2020: General John Raymond, Class of 2003, Chief of Space Operations
- 2019: Vice Admiral Bruce E. Grooms, Class of 1993, Deputy CNO for Operations, Plans, Strategy
- 2018: Admiral Scott H. Swift, Class of 1993, Commander, U.S. Pacific Fleet
- 2017: General Lori J. Robinson, Class of 1995, Commander, (NORAD) and U.S. Northern Command
- 2016: General Mark Milley, Class of 2000, 39th Army Chief of Staff
- 2015: Admiral Michael S. Rogers, Class of 1992, Commander, U.S. Cyber Command
- 2014: General David M. Rodriguez, Class of 1997, Commander, U.S. Africa Command
- 2013: Vice Admiral Robert S. Harward Jr., Class of 1993, Deputy Commander, USCENTOM
- 2012: Admiral James A. Winnefeld Jr., Class of 1994, Vice Chairman, Joint Chiefs of Staff
- 2011: The Honorable Clifford L. Stanley, Under Secretary of State
- 2010: Admiral Robert J. Papp Jr., Class of 1990, Commandant, U.S. Coast Guard
- 2009: General Raymond T. Odierno, Class of 1990, U.S. Forces – Iraq
- 2008: General James E. Cartwright, Class of 1991, Vice Chairman, Joint Chiefs of Staff
- 2007: Admiral James Stavridis, Commander, U.S. Southern Command
- 2006: Vice Admiral David L. Brewer, Class of 1994, Commander, Military Sealift, Command
- 2005: The Honorable Christopher R. Hill, Class of 1994, CNW Assistant Secretary of State for East Asian and Pacific Affairs
- 2004: General Michael W. Hagee, Class of 1987, Commandant, U.S. Marine Corps
- 2003: Admiral Gregory G. Johnson, Commander, U.S. Naval Forces, Europe
- 2002: Colonel Charles J. Precourt, Class of 1990, Chief of NASA’s Astronaut Corps
- 2001: Admiral William J. Fallon, Class of 1978, Vice Chief of Naval Operations
- 2000: Admiral Robert J. Natter, Class of 1987, Commander, U.S. Atlantic Fleet
- 1999: General Charles E. Wilhelm, Class of 1983, Commander, U.S. Southern Command
- 1998: Admiral Robert E. Kramek, Class of 1981, Commandant of the USCG
- 1997: Admiral Joseph W. Prueher, Class of 1973, Commander-in-Chief, U.S. Pacific Command
- 1996: General John M. Shalikashvili, Class of 1970, Chairman of the Joint Chiefs of Staff
