= Werner Rahn =

German historian (1939–2022)

- Born: 9 June 1939; Ilsenburg, Germany
- Died: 19 November 2022 (aged 83); Potsdam, Germany

Werner Rahn (9 June 1939 – 19 November 2022) was a German naval historian and naval officer.

== Career ==
Werner Rahn entered the Naval Academy Mürwik and served at sea and ashore in a variety of appointments, reaching the rank of captain. He studied history at the University of Hamburg under Professor Dr. Moltmann and received his PhD in 1974 with a thesis entitled Reichsmarine und Landesverteidigung, 1919–1928. He served as lecturer in military history at the Naval Academy Mürwik and later Docent for military history at the Führungsakademie der Bundeswehr at Hamburg. From 1980 to 1997, he served at the German Armed Forces Military History Research Office in Freiburg im Breisgau as head of the naval history section and deputy director, and later after that office moved to Potsdam, as Director from 1995 to 1997. He retired from active service in the German Navy in 1997. In September 2016, he was awarded the Hattendorf Prize for Distinguished Original Research in Maritime History. Werner Rahn died in Potsdam, Brandenburg on 19 November 2022, at the age of 83.

== Published works ==
Rahn published many books and articles on German naval history:

- Reichsmarine und Landesverteidigung, 1919−1928, (1976)
- Die Deutsche Flotte im Spannungsfeld der Politik 1848−1985 : Vorträge u. Diskussionen d. 25. histor.-takt. Tagung d. Flotte 1985 edited by Werner Rahn (1985).
- Das Deutsche Reich und der Zweite Weltkrieg, vol. 6 (1990)
- Kriegstagebuches der Seekriegsleitung, 1939–1945, senior editor of the 68-volume facsimile edition, im Auftr. des Militärgeschichtlichen Forschungsamtes in Verbindung mit dem Bundesarchiv-Militärarchiv und der Marine-Offizier-Vereinigung hrsg. von Werner Rahn und Gerhard Schreiber unter Mitw. von Hansjoseph Maierhöfer (1988–1997).
- Deutsche Marinerüstung 1919–1942: die Gefahren der Tirpitz-Tradition, edited by Wilhelm Treue, Eberhard Möller, Werner Rahn (1992).
- Vom Kaiserreich zur Bundesrepublik: aus den Schriften eines engagierten Offiziers und Staatsbürgers, by Siegfried Sorge edited by Werner Rahn (1993).
- Die deutsche Kriegsmarine: 1935−1945 by François-Emmanuel Brézet with a Foreword by Werner Rahn (2003).
- Deutsche Marinen im Wandel: vom Symbol nationaler Einheit zum Instrument internationaler Sicherheit edited by Wener Rahn (2005).
- Der Krieg in der Nordsee, im Auftrag des Militärgeschichtlichen Forschungsamtes bearbeitet und neu herausgegeben von Gerhard P. Gross unter Mitarbeit von Werner Rahn.
