= Alan Frost =

Australian historian

- Born: 29 March 1943; Cairns, Queensland, Australia
- Died: 12 April 2023 (aged 80)
- Awards: Fellow of the Royal Historical Society (1988); Fellow of the Australian Academy of the Humanities (1990)

Academic background
- Education: University of Queensland (BA, MA); University of Rochester (MA, PhD)
- Influences: Geoffrey Blainey

Academic work
- Institutions: La Trobe University
- Main interests: Colonisation of Australia
- Notable works: Botany Bay Mirages (1994)

Alan J. Frost FRHistS, FAHA (29 March 1943 – 12 April 2023) was an Australian historian and professor emeritus at La Trobe University. A major theme of his research involved the European exploration of the Pacific Ocean over the second half of the eighteenth century. He is best known for books in which he challenged common historical stereotypes and misconceptions concerning the colonisation of Australia. These include Botany Bay Mirages: Illusions of Australia's Convict Beginnings, Botany Bay: The Real Story, The First Fleet: The Real Story, and Mutiny, Mayhem, Mythology: Bounty's Enigmatic Voyage. Frost's arguments radically challenge those expressed by prominent historians Manning Clark and Robert Hughes.

== Early life ==
Frost was born in 1943 in Cairns and, as the son of teachers, spent his childhood in rural Queensland including time in Gayndah, Beaudesert, East Barron and Cardwell.

== Academic career ==
Frost completed an MA at the University of Queensland in 1966. Following this, he went to the University of Rochester in New York, where he completed an MA (1968) and a PhD (1969). He took up his appointment in the English department at La Trobe University in 1970, moving full time into the history department in 1975. He was a visiting scholar at Oxford University and taught at the Australian National University, the University of Texas at Austin and the University of Calgary. He served as Pro-Vice Chancellor and Director of La Trobe's Mildura Campus (2004–2006) and as Director, Institute for Advanced Study (2006–2008). He held a personal chair in history at La Trobe until his retirement in 2008, after which he became professor emeritus and continued his scholarship.

== Awards and honours ==
- Hon. D.Litt., La Trobe University (2008)
- Centenary Medal (2003)
- D.Litt., University of Queensland (1996)
- Fellow of the Australian Academy of the Humanities (1990)
- Fellow of the Royal Historical Society (1988)

== The Frost Archive ==
For over 35 years Frost collected primary documents relating to the decision to colonise Australia, the mounting of the First Fleet and the early settlement of Sydney. Totalling about 2500 documents, these records were drawn from locations scattered around the globe in order to reconstitute original series and sequences. Give the scope and range of sources and subject matter, they offer a greater overview of these historical events than any single participant could have had at the time. The Frost Archive has vastly expanded the historical record readily available to historians, allowing a more sophisticated base from which to make analyses. It is to be made available on a website of the State Library of New South Wales.

== Major Published Works ==
- Mutiny, Mayhem, Mythology: Bounty's Enigmatic Voyage, Sydney University Press, 2018
- Botany Bay: The Real Story, Melbourne, Black Inc., 2011.
- The First Fleet: The Real Story, Melbourne, Black Inc., 2011.
- The Atlantic world of the 1780s and Botany Bay: The Lost Connection, Bundoora, Melbourne, La Trobe University, 2008.
- The Global Reach of Empire: Britain's maritime expansion in the Indian and Pacific Oceans 1764–1815, Carlton, Victoria: Miegunyah Press, 2003.
- Voyage of the Endeavour: Captain Cook and the discovery of the Pacific, St Leonards, N.S.W.: Allen & Unwin, 1999.
- East coast country: a North Queensland dreaming, Carlton, Victoria: Melbourne University Press, 1996.
- The Precarious Life of James Mario Matra – Voyager with Cook, American Loyalist, Servant of Empire, Carlton, Victoria, Miegunyah Press, 1995.
- Botany Bay mirages: illusions of Australia's convict beginnings, Carlton, Victoria: Melbourne University Press, 1994.
- Sir Joseph Banks and the transfer of plants to and from the South Pacific, 1786–1798, Melbourne, Colony Press, 1993.
- Arthur Phillip, 1738–1814: his voyaging, Melbourne, Oxford University Press, 1987.
- Convicts and empire: a naval question, 1776–1811, Melbourne University Press, 1980.
- Dreams of a Pacific Empire: Sir George Young's proposal for a colonization of New South Wales (1784–5), a parallel edition of the texts, together with an introduction discussing their historical background and foreground, Sydney, Resolution Press, 1980.

== Edited Published Works ==
- Alan Frost and Jane Samson, eds., Pacific Empires: Essays in Honour of Glyndwr Williams, Vancouver, University of British Columbia Press, 1999.
- Alan Frost and John Hardy, eds., European Voyaging towards Australia, Canberra, Australian Academy of the Humanities, 1990.
- Alan Frost and John Hardy, eds., Studies from Terra Australis to Australia, Canberra, Australian Academy of the Humanities, 1989.
- Glyndwr Williams and Alan Frost, eds., Terra Australis to Australia, Melbourne, Oxford University Press in association with the Australian Academy of the Humanities, 1988.
- Alan Frost and R.J.B. Knight, eds., The Journal of Daniel Paine 1794–1797, Sydney, Library of Australian History in association with the National Maritime Museum (Greenwich), 1983.
