= C. Northcote Parkinson =

British naval historian (1909–1993)

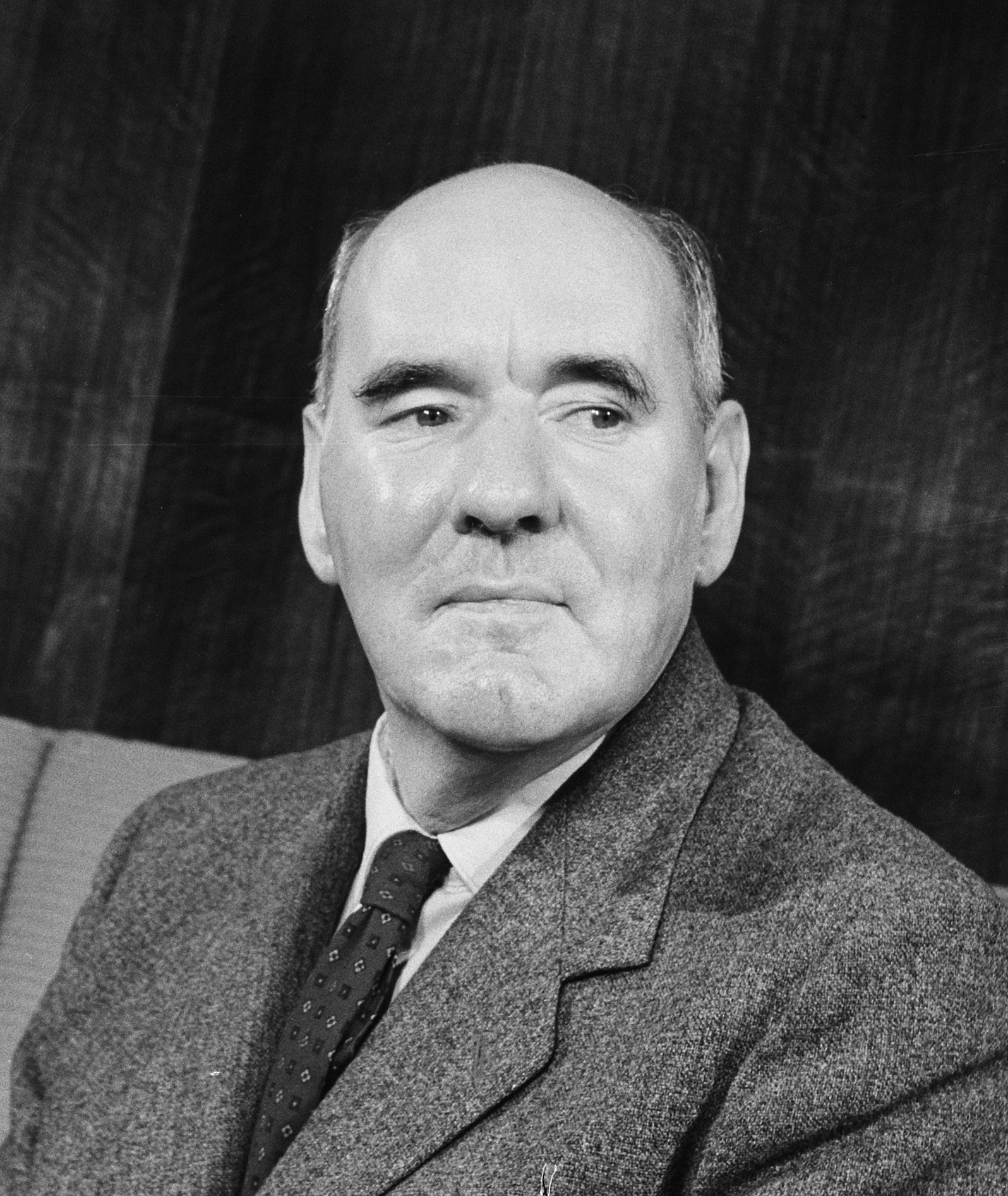
- Parkinson in 1961
- Born: Cyril Northcote Parkinson; July 30, 1909; Barnard Castle, County Durham, England
- Died: 9 March 1993 (aged 83); Canterbury, Kent, England
- Resting place: Canterbury
- Education: University of Cambridge; King's College London
- Occupation: Naval historian
- Writing career
- Subject: Naval history
- Notable work: Parkinson's Law (1957)
- Notable awards: Julian Corbett Prize in Naval History

Cyril Northcote Parkinson (30 July 1909 – 9 March 1993) was a British naval historian and author of some 60 books, the most famous of which was his best-seller Parkinson's Law (1957), in which Parkinson named the satirical Law stating that "work expands so as to fill the time available for its completion" after himself. The Law came to be taken seriously and led to his being regarded as an important scholar in public administration and management.

== Early life and education ==
The youngest son of William Edward Parkinson (1871–1927), an art master at North East County School and from 1913 principal of York School of Arts and Crafts, and his wife, Rose Emily Mary Curnow (born 1877), Parkinson attended St. Peter's School, York, where in 1929 he won an exhibition to study history at Emmanuel College, Cambridge. He received a BA degree in 1932. As an undergraduate, Parkinson developed an interest in naval history, which he pursued when the Pellew family gave him access to family papers at the recently established National Maritime Museum. The papers formed the basis of his first book, Edward Pellew, Viscount Exmouth, Admiral of the Red. In 1934, then a graduate student at King's College London, he wrote his PhD thesis on Trade and War in the Eastern Seas, 1803–1810, which was awarded the Julian Corbett Prize in Naval History for 1935.

== Academic and military career ==
While a graduate student in 1934, Parkinson was commissioned into the Territorial Army in the 22nd London Regiment (The Queen's), was promoted to lieutenant the same year, and commanded an infantry company at the jubilee of King George V in 1935. In the same year, Emmanuel College, Cambridge elected him a research fellow. While at Cambridge, he commanded an infantry unit of the Cambridge University Officers' Training Corps. He was promoted to captain in 1937.

He became senior history master at Blundell's School in Tiverton, Devon in 1938 (and a captain in the school's OTC), then instructor at the Royal Naval College, Dartmouth in 1939. In 1940, he joined the Queen's Royal Regiment as a captain and undertook a range of staff and military teaching positions in Britain. In 1943 he married Ethelwyn Edith Graves (born 1915), a nurse tutor at Middlesex Hospital, with whom he had two children.

Demobilized as a major in 1945, he was a lecturer in history at the University of Liverpool from 1946 to 1949. In 1950, he was appointed Raffles Professor of History at the new University of Malaya in Singapore. While there, he initiated an important series of historical monographs on the history of Malaya, publishing the first in 1960. A movement developed in the mid-1950s to establish two campuses, one in Kuala Lumpur and one in Singapore. Parkinson attempted to persuade the authorities to avoid dividing the university by maintaining it in Johor Bahru to serve both Singapore and Malaya. His efforts were unsuccessful and the two campuses were established in 1959. The Singapore campus later became the University of Singapore.

Parkinson divorced in 1952 and he married the writer and journalist Ann Fry (1921–1983), with whom he had two sons and a daughter. In 1958, while still in Singapore, he published his most famous work, Parkinson's Law, which expanded upon a humorous article that he had published in the Economist magazine in November 1955, satirising government bureaucracies. The 120-page book of short studies, published in the United States and then in Britain, was illustrated by Osbert Lancaster and became an instant best seller. It explained the inevitability of bureaucratic expansion, arguing that 'work expands to fill the time available for its completion'. Typical of his satire and cynical humour, it included a discourse on Parkinson's Law of Triviality (debates about expenses for a nuclear plant, a bicycle shed, and refreshments), a note on why driving on the left side of the road (see road transport) is natural, and suggested that the Royal Navy would eventually have more admirals than ships. After serving as visiting professor at Harvard University in 1958, the University of Illinois and the University of California, Berkeley in 1959–60, he resigned his post in Singapore to become an independent writer.

To avoid high taxation in Britain, he moved to the Channel Islands and settled at St Martin's, Guernsey, where he purchased Les Caches Hall. In Guernsey, he was an active member of the community and was committed to the feudal heritage of the island. He financed a historical re-enactment of the Chevauche de Saint Michel (Cavalcade) by the Court of Seigneurs and wrote a newspaper article about it. He was an official member of the Royal Court of Chief Pleas in his quality of Seigneur d'Anneville as he had acquired the manorial rights of the Fief d'Anneville. Attendance at the Royal Court of Chief Pleas is considered very important in Guernsey, as it is the island's oldest court and its first historical self-governing body. In 1968 he purchased and restored Anneville Manor, the historic manor house of the Seigneurie (or fief) d'Anneville, and in 1971 he restored the Chapel of Thomas d'Anneville pertaining to the same fief. His writings from this period included a series of historical novels featuring a fictional naval officer from Guernsey, Richard Delancey, during the Napoleonic era. In the novel, Richard Delancey was Seigneur of the Fief d'Anneville.

In 1969 he was invited to deliver the MacMillan Memorial Lecture to the Institution of Engineers and Shipbuilders in Scotland. He chose the subject "The Status of the Engineer".

== Parkinson and his 'law' ==
Parkinson's law, which provides insight into a primary barrier to efficient time management, states that, "work expands so as to fill the time available for its completion". This articulates a situation and an unexplained force that many have come to take for granted and accept. "In exactly the same way nobody bothered and nobody cared, before Newton's day, why an apple should drop to the ground when it might so easily fly up after leaving the tree," wrote Straits Times editor-in-chief, Allington Kennard, who continued, "There is less gravity in Professor Parkinson's Law, but hardly less truth."

Parkinson first published his law in a humorous satirical article in The Economist on 19 November 1955, meant as a critique on the efficiency of public administration and civil service bureaucracy, and the continually rising headcount, and related cost, attached to these. That article noted that, "Politicians and taxpayers have assumed (with occasional phases of doubt) that a rising total in the number of civil servants must reflect a growing volume of work to be done." The law examined two sub-laws, The Law of Multiplication of Subordinates, and The Law of Multiplication of Work, and provided 'scientific proof' of the validity of these, including mathematical formulae.

Two years later, the law was revisited when Parkinson's new books, Parkinson's Law And Other Studies in Administration and Parkinson's Law: Or The Pursuit of Progress were published in 1957.

In Singapore, where he was teaching at the time, this began a series of talks where he addressed diverse audiences in person, in print, and over the airwaves on 'Parkinson's Law'. For example, on 16 October 1957, at 10 a.m., he spoke on this at the International Women's Club programme talk held at the Y.W.C.A. at Raffles Quay. The advent of his new book as well as an interview during his debut talk was covered in an editorial in The Straits Times shortly after, entitled, "A professor's cocktail party secret: They arrive half an hour late and rotate." Time, which also wrote about the book, noted that its theme was "a delightfully unprofessional diagnosis of the widespread 20th century malady – galloping orgmanship." Orgmanship, according to Parkinson, was "the tendency of all administrative departments to increase the number of subordinate staff, irrespective of the amount of work (if any) to be done", as noted by The Straits Times. Parkinson, it was reported, wanted to trace the illegibility of signatures, the attempt being made to fix the point in a successful executive career at which the handwriting becomes meaningless, even to the executive himself.

Straits Times editor-in-chief Allington Kennard's editorial, "Twice the staff for half the work", in mid-April 1958, touched on further aspects or sub-laws, like Parkinson's Law of Triviality, and also other interesting, if dangerous areas, like "the problem of the retirement age, how not to pay Singapore income tax when a millionaire, the point of vanishing interest in high finance, how to get rid of the company chairman," etc. The author supported Parkinson's Law of Triviality – which states that, "The time spent on any item of an agenda is in inverse proportion to the sum involved," with a local example where it took the Singapore City Council "six hours to pick a new man for the gasworks and two and a half minutes to approve a $100 million budget." It is possible that the book, humorous though it is, may have touched a raw nerve among the administration at that time. As J. D. Scott, in his review of Parkinson's book two weeks later, notes, "Of course, Parkinson's Law, like all satire, is serious – it wouldn't be so comic if it weren't – and because it is serious there will be some annoyance and even dismay under the smiles."

His celebrity did not remain local. Parkinson travelled to England, arriving there aboard the P&O Canton, in early June 1958, as reported by Reuters, and made the front page of The Straits Times on 9 June. Reporting from London on Saturday 14 June 1958, Hall Romney wrote, "Prof. C. N. Parkinson of the University of Malaya, whose book, Parkinson's Law has sold more than 80,000 copies, has had a good deal of publicity since he arrived in England in the Canton." Romney noted that "a television interview was arranged, a profile of him appeared in a highbrow Sunday newspaper, columnists gave him almost as much space as they gave to Leslie Charteris, and he was honoured by the Institute of Directors, whose reception was attended by many of the most notable men in the commercial life of London." And then, all of a sudden, satire was answered with some honesty when, as another Reuters release republished in The Straits Times under the title "Parkinson's Law at work in the UK," quoted, "A PARLIAMENTARY committee, whose Job is to see that British Government departments do not waste the taxpayer's money, said yesterday it was alarmed at the rate of staff increases in certain sections of the War Office. Admiralty and Air Ministry..." In March 1959, further publicity occurred when the Royal Navy in Singapore took umbrage at a remark Parkinson had made during his talk, about his new book on the wastage of public money, in Manchester, shortly before. Parkinson is reported to have said, "Britain spent about $500 million building a naval base there [Singapore] and the only fleet which has used it is the Japanese." A navy spokesman, then, attempting to counter that statement said that the Royal Navy's Singapore base had only been completed in 1939, and, while it was confirmed that the Japanese had, indeed used it during the Second World War, it had been used extensively by the Royal Navy's Far East fleet, after the war. Emeritus Professor of Japanese Studies at the University of Oxford, Richard Storry, writing in the Oxford Mail on 16 May 1962, noted, "The fall of Singapore is still viewed with anger and shame in Britain."

On Thursday 10 September 1959, at 10 p.m., Radio Singapore listeners got to experience his book, Parkinson's Law, set to music by Nesta Pain. The serialised program continued until the end of February 1960. Parkinson, and Parkinson's law, continued to find its way into Singapore newspapers through the decades.

== University of Malaya ==
Singapore was introduced to him almost immediately upon his arrival there, through exposure in the newspaper and a number of public appearances. Parkinson started teaching at the University of Malaya in Singapore at the beginning of April 1950.

=== Public lectures ===
The first lecture of the Raffles Professor of History was a public lecture given at the Oei Tiong Ham Hall, on 19 May. Parkinson, who was speaking on "The Task of the Historian," began by noting the new Raffles history chair was aptly named because it was Sir Stamford Raffles who had tried to found the university in 1823 and because Raffles himself was a historian. There was a large audience, including Professor Alexander Oppenheim, the university's Dean of the Faculty of Arts.

The text of his lecture was then reproduced and published over two issues of The Straits Times a few days later.

On 17 April 1953, he addressed the public on "The Historical Aspect of the Coronation," at the Singapore YMCA Hall.

Sponsored by the Malayan Historical Society, Parkinson gave a talk on the "Modern history of Taiping" at the residence of the District Officer, Larut and Matang on 12 August 1953.

Sponsored by the Singapore branch of the Malayan Historical Society, on 5 February 1954 Parkinson gave a public lecture on "Singapore in the sixties" [1860s] at St. Andrew's Cathedral War Memorial Hall.

Sponsored by the Seremban branch of the Historical Society of Malaya, Parkinson spoke on Tin Mining at the King George V School, Seremban. He said, in the past, Chinese labourers were imported from China at $32 a head to work the tin fields of Malaya. He said that mining developed steadily after British protection had been established and that tin from Negri Sembilan in the 1870s came from Sungei Ujong and Rembau, and worked with capital from Malacca. He noted that Chinese working side-by-side with Europeans did better with their primitive methods and made great profits when they took over mines that Europeans abandoned.

Arranged by the Indian University Graduates Association of Singapore, Parkinson gave a talk on "Indian Political Thought," at the USIS theatrette on 16 February 1955.

On 10 March 1955, he spoke on "What I think about Colonialism," at the British Council Hall, Stamford Road, Singapore, at 6.30 p.m. In his lecture, he argued that nationalism which was generally believed to be good, and colonialism which was seen as the reverse, were not necessarily opposite ideas but the same thing seen from different angles. He thought the gifts from Britain that Malaya and Singapore should value most and retain when they became self-governing included debate, literature (not comics), armed forces' tradition (not police state), arts, tolerance and humour (not puritanism) and public spirit.

=== Public exhibitions ===
On 18 August 1950, Parkinson opened a week-long exhibition on the "History of English Handwriting," at the British Council centre, Stamford Road, Singapore.

On 21 March 1952, he opened an exhibition of photographs from the Times of London which had been shown widely in different parts of the world. The exhibition comprised a selection of photographs spanning 1921 to 1951. 140 photographs were on display for a month at the British Council Hall, Singapore, showing scenes ranging from the German surrender to the opening of the Festival of Britain by the late king.

He opened an exhibition of photographs taken by students of the University of Malaya during their tour of India, at the University Arts Theatre in Cluny Road, Singapore, 10 October 1953.

=== Victor Purcell ===
Towards the end of August, Professor of Far Eastern History at Cambridge University, Dr. Victor Purcell, who was also a former Acting Secretary of Chinese Affairs in Singapore, addressed the Kuala Lumpur Rotary Club. The Straits Times, quoting Purcell, noted, "Professor C. N. Parkinson had been appointed to the Chair of History at the University of Malaya and 'we can confidently anticipate that under his direction academic research into Malaya's history will assume a creative aspect which it has not possessed before.'"

=== Johore Transfer Committee ===
In October, Parkinson was appointed by the Senate of the University of Malaya to head a special committee of experts to consult on technical details regarding the transfer of the university to Johore. Along with him were professor R. E. Holttum (botany), and acting professors C. G. Webb (physics) and D. W. Fryer (geography).

=== Library and Museum ===
In November, Parkinson was appointed a member of the committee for the management of Raffles Library and Museum, replacing Professor G. G. Hough who had resigned.

In March 1952, Parkinson proposed a central public library for Singapore as a memorial to King George VI, commemorating that monarch's reign. He is reported to have said, "Perhaps the day has gone by for public monuments except in a useful form. And if that be so, might not, some enterprise of local importance be graced with the late King's name? One plan he could certainly have warmly approved would be that of building a Central Public Library," he opined. Parkinson noted that the Raffles Library was growing in usefulness and would, in short time, outgrow the building that then housed it. He said, given the educational work that was producing a large literate population demanding books in English, Malay and Chinese, what was surely needed was a genuinely public library, air-conditioned to preserve the books, and of a design to make those books readily accessible. He suggested that the building, equipment and maintenance of the public library ought to be the responsibility of the municipality rather than the government.

T. P. F. McNeice, then-president of the Singapore City Council, as well as leading educationists of the time, thought the suggestion "an excellent, first-class suggestion to meet a definite and urgent need." McNeice also agreed that the project ought to be the responsibility of the city council. Also in favour of the idea was Director of Education Alfred William Frisby, who thought that there ought to be branches of the library which could be fed by the central library, Raffles Institution Principal P. F. Howitt, Canon R. K. S. Adams (Principal of St. Andrews School) and Homer Cheng, the president of the Chinese Y.M.C.A. Principal of the Anglo-Chinese School, H. H. Peterson, suggested the authorities also consider a mobile school library.

While Parkinson had originally suggested that this be a municipal and not a government undertaking, something changed. A public meeting, convened by the Friends of Singapore – Parkinson was its President – at the British Council Hall on 15 May, decided that Singapore's memorial to King George VI would take the form of a public library, possibly with mobile units and sub-libraries in the out-of-town districts. Parkinson, in addressing the assembly, noted that Raffles Library was not a free library, did not have vernacular sections, and its building could not be air-conditioned. McNeice, the municipal president, then proposed a resolution be sent to government that the meeting considered the most appropriate memorial to the late king ought to take the form of a library (or libraries) and urged the government to set up a committee with enough non-government representation to consider the matter.

The government got involved, and a government spokesperson spoke to The Straits Times about this on 16 May, saying that the Singapore government welcomed proposals from the public on the form in which a memorial to King George ought to take, whether a public library, as suggested by Parkinson, or some other form.

In the middle of 1952, the Singapore government began setting up a committee to consider the suggestions made on the form Singapore's memorial to King George VI ought to take. G. G. Thomson, the government's public relations secretary, informed The Straits Times that the committee would have official and non-government representation and added that, apart from Parkinson's suggestion of a free public library, a polytechnic had also been suggested.

W. L. Blythe, the colonial secretary, making it clear where his vote lay, pointed out that Singapore at that time already had a library, the Raffles Library. News coverage notes that yet another committee had been formed, this time to consider what would be necessary to establish an institution along the lines of the London Polytechnic. Blythe stated that the arguments he had heard in favour of a polytechnic were very strong.

Director of Raffles Library and Museum, W. M. F. Tweedie, was in favour of the King George VI free public library but up to the end of November, nothing had been heard of any developments towards that end. Tweedie suggested the ground beside the British Council as being suitable for such a library, and, if the public library was built, he would suggest for all the books at the Raffles Library to be moved to the new site, so that the space thus vacated could be used for a public art gallery.

Right after, the government, who were not supposed to have been involved in the first place – the suggestion made by Parkinson and accepted by City Council President T. P. F. McNeice that this be a municipal and not government undertaking – approved the proposal to set up a polytechnic as a memorial to King George IV.

And Singapore continued with its subscription library and was without a free public library as envisioned by Parkinson. However, his call did not go unheeded. The following year, in August 1953, the Lee Foundation pledged a dollar-for-dollar match up to $375,000 towards the establishment of a national library, provided that it was a free, without-cost, public library, open to men and women of every race, class, creed, and colour.

It was not, however, until November 1960 that Parkinson's vision was realised, when the new library, free and for all, was completed and opened to the public.

=== Film Censorship Consultative Committee ===
That same month he was also appointed, by the Singapore Government, chairman of a committee set up to study film censorship in the colony and suggest changes, if necessary.

Their terms of reference were to enquire into the existing procedure and legislation relating to cinematograph film censorship and to make recommendations with a view to improving the system, including legislation. They were also asked to consider whether the Official Film Censor should continue to be the controller of the British film quota, and to consider the memorandum of the film trade submitted to the governor earlier that year.

=== Investigating, archiving and writing Malaya's past ===
At the beginning of December 1950, Parkinson made an appeal at the Singapore Rotary Club for old log books, diaries, newspaper files, ledgers or maps accumulated over the years. He asked that these be passed to the Raffles Library or the University of Malaya library, instead of being thrown away, as they might aid research and help those studying the history of the country to set down an account of what had happened in Malaya since 1867. "The time will come when school-children will be taught the history of their own land rather than of Henry VIII or the capture of Quebec. Parkinson told his audience that there was a large volume of documentary evidence about Malaya written in Portuguese and Dutch. He said that the arrival of the Pluto in Singapore, one of the first vessels to pass through the Suez Canal when it opened in 1869, might be described as the moment when British Malaya was born. "I would urge you not to scrap old correspondence just because it clutters up the office. Send it to a library where it may some day be of great value," he said.

In September 1951 the magazine British Malaya published Parkinson's letter that called for the formation of one central archives office where all the historical records of Malaya and Singapore could be properly preserved, pointing out that it would be of inestimable value to administrators, historians, economists, social science investigators and students. In his letter, Parkinson, who was still abroad in London attending the Anglo-American Conference of Historians, said that the formation of an archives office was already in discussion, and was urgent, in view of the climate where documents were liable to damage by insects and mildew. He said that many private documents relating to Malaya were kept in the U.K. where they were not appreciated because names like Maxwell, Braddell and Swettenham might mean nothing there. "The establishment of a Malayan Archives Office would do much to encourage the transfer of these documents," he wrote.

On 22 May 1953, Parkinson convened a meeting at the British Council, Stamford Road, Singapore, to form the Singapore branch of the Malayan Historical Society.

Speaking at the inaugural meeting of the society's Singapore branch, Parkinson, addressing the more than 100 people attending, said the aims of the branch would be to assist in the recording of history, folklore, tradition and customs of Malaya and its people and to encourage the preservation of objects of historical and cultural interest. Of Malayan history, he said, it "has mostly still to be written. Nor can it even be taught in the schools until that writing has been done."

Parkinson had been urging the Singapore and Federation Governments to set up a national archives since 1950. In June 1953 he urged the speedy establishment of a national archives, where, "in air-conditioned rooms, on steel shelves, with proper skilled supervision and proper precaution against fire and theft, the records of Malayan history might be preserved indefinitely and at small expense. He noted that cockroaches had nibbled away at many vital documents and records, shrouding many years of Malaya's past in mystery, aided by moths and silverfish and abetted by negligent officials.

A start had, by then, already been made – an air-conditioned room at the Federal Museum had already been set aside for storing important historical documents and preserving them from cockroaches and decay, the work of Peter Williams-Hunt, the Federation Director of Museums and Adviser on Aborigine Affairs who had died that month. He noted, however, that the problems of supervising archives and collecting old documents had still to be solved.

In January 1955 Parkinson formed University of Malaya's Archaeological Society and became its first president. Upon commencement, The society had a membership of 53 which was reported to be the largest of its kind in Southeast Asia at the time. "Drive to discover the secrets of S.E. Asia. Hundreds of amateurs will delve into mysteries of the past."

In April 1956 it was reported that "For the first time, a long-needed Standard History of Malaya is to be published for students." According to the news report a large-scale project, developing a ten-volume series, the result of ten years of research by University of Malaya staff, was currently in progress, detailing events dating back to the Portuguese occupation of 1511, to the, then, present day. The first volume, written by Parkinson, covered the years 1867 to 1877 and was to be published within three months thence. It was estimated that the last volume would be released after 1960. The report noted that, as at that time, Parkinson and his wife had already released two books on history for junior students, entitled The Heroes and Malayan Fables.

Three months passed by and the book remained unpublished. It was not until 1960 that British intervention in Malaya (1867–1877), that the first volume finally found its way onto bookshelves and into libraries. By that time, the press reported the series had expanded into a twelve-volume set.

=== Malayan history syllabus ===
In January 1951 Parkinson was interviewed by New Zealand film producer and director Wynona "Noni" Hope Wright. He told of his reorganisation of the Department of History during the last term to facilitate a new syllabus. The interview took place in Parkinson's sitting room beneath a frieze depicting Malaya's history, painted by Parkinson. Departing from the usual syllabus, Parkinson had decided to leave out European History almost entirely in order to give greater focus to Southeast Asia, particularly Malaya. The course, designed experimentally, takes in the study of world history up to 1497 in the first year, the impact of different European nations on Southeast Asia in the second year, and the study of Southeast Asia, particularly Malaya, after the establishment of British influence at the Straits Settlements in the third year. The students who make it through and decide to specialise in history will then have been brought to a point where they can profitably undertake original research in the history of modern Malaya, i.e. the 19th and 20th centuries, an area where, according to Parkinson, little had been done, with hardly any serious research attempted for the period after 'the transfer' in 1867. Parkinson hoped that lecturing on this syllabus would ultimately produce a full-scale history of Malaya. This would include discovering documentation from Portuguese and Dutch sources from the time when those two countries still had a foothold in Malaya. He said that, while the period of development of the Straits Settlements under the East India Company were well-documented – the bulk of these archived at the Raffles Museum, local records after 1867 were not as plentiful and that it would be necessary to reconstruct those records from microfilm copies of documents kept in the United Kingdom. The task for the staff at the History Department was made formidable because their unfamiliarity with the Dutch and Portuguese languages. "I have no doubt that the history of Malaya must finally be written by Malayans, but we can at least do very much to prepare the way." Parkinson told Wright. "Scholars trained at this University in the spirit and technique of historical research, a study divorced from all racial and religious animosities, a study concerned only with finding the truth and explaining it in a lucid and attractive literary form, should be able to make a unique contribution to the mutual understanding of East and West," he said. "History apart, nothing seems to be of more vital importance in our time than the promotion of this understanding. In no field at the present time does the perpetuation of distrust and mutual incomprehension seem more dangerous. If we can, from this university, send forth graduates who can combine learning and ways of thought of the Far East and of the West, they may play a great part in overcoming the barriers of prejudice, insularity and ignorance," he concluded.

=== Radio Malaya programs ===
In March 1951 Parkinson wrote a historical feature, "The China Fleet," for Radio Malaya, offering a what was said to be a true account in dramatic form of an incident in the annals of the East India Company that had such an influence on Malaya and other parts of Southeast Asia in the early nineteenth century.

On 28 January 1952, at 9.40 p.m. he talked about the founding of Singapore.

=== Special Constabulary ===
In the middle of April 1951, Parkinson was sworn in as special constable by ASP Watson of the Singapore Special Constabulary at the Oei Tion Ham Hall, together with other members of the staff, and students who were then placed under Parkinson's supervision. The special constabulary, The University Corp, being informed of their duties and powers of arrest were then issued batons and charged with the defence of the university in the event of trouble. Lecturer in Economics, P. Sherwood, was appointed Parkinson's assistant. These measures were taken to ensure that rioters were dispersed and ejected if they trespassed onto university grounds. Parkinson signed a notice that noted that some of the rioters who took part in the December disorders came from an area near the university buildings in Bukit Timah.

These precautions were taken in advance of the Maria Hertogh appeal on Monday 16 April. The case was postponed a number of times, after which it was finally heard at the end of July.

=== Anglo-American Conference of Historians ===
Parkinson departed Singapore on Monday 18 June 1951 for London, where he represented the University of Malaya at the Fifth Anglo-American Conference of Historians there from 9 to 14 July. He was to return in October at the start of the new academic year.

=== Resignation ===
In October 1958, while still on sabbatical in America – together with his wife and two young children, he had set off for America in May 1958 for study and travel and was due to return to work in April 1959 – Parkinson, through a letter sent from New York, resigned his position at the University of Malaya. K. G. Tregonning was at that time acting head of the history department.

Parkinson had not been the only one to resign while on leave. Professor E. H. G. Dobby of the geography department had also submitted his resignation while away on sabbatical leave. After deliberations, the university council had decided, before the university's new constitution came into force on 15 January, that no legal action would be taken against Dobby – the majority of the council feeling that there was no case against Dobby as his resignation occurred before new regulations governing sabbatical leave benefits were introduced. In Parkinson's case, however, the council determined that that resignation had been submitted after the regulations came into effect, and a decision had been made to write to him, asking that he report back to work before a certain date, failing which the council said it was free to take any action they thought appropriate.

In July 1959, K. G. Tregonning, acting head of the history department, and history lecturer at the University of Malaya since 1952, was appointed to fill the Raffles History Chair left vacant by Parkinson's resignation. There was nothing in the press about whether the matter between Parkinson and the university had been resolved, or not.

== Later life and death ==
After the death of his second wife in 1984, in 1985 Parkinson married Iris Hilda Waters (died 1994) and moved to the Isle of Man. After two years there, they moved to Canterbury, Kent, where he died in March 1993, at the age of 83. He was buried in Canterbury, and the law named after him is quoted as his epitaph.

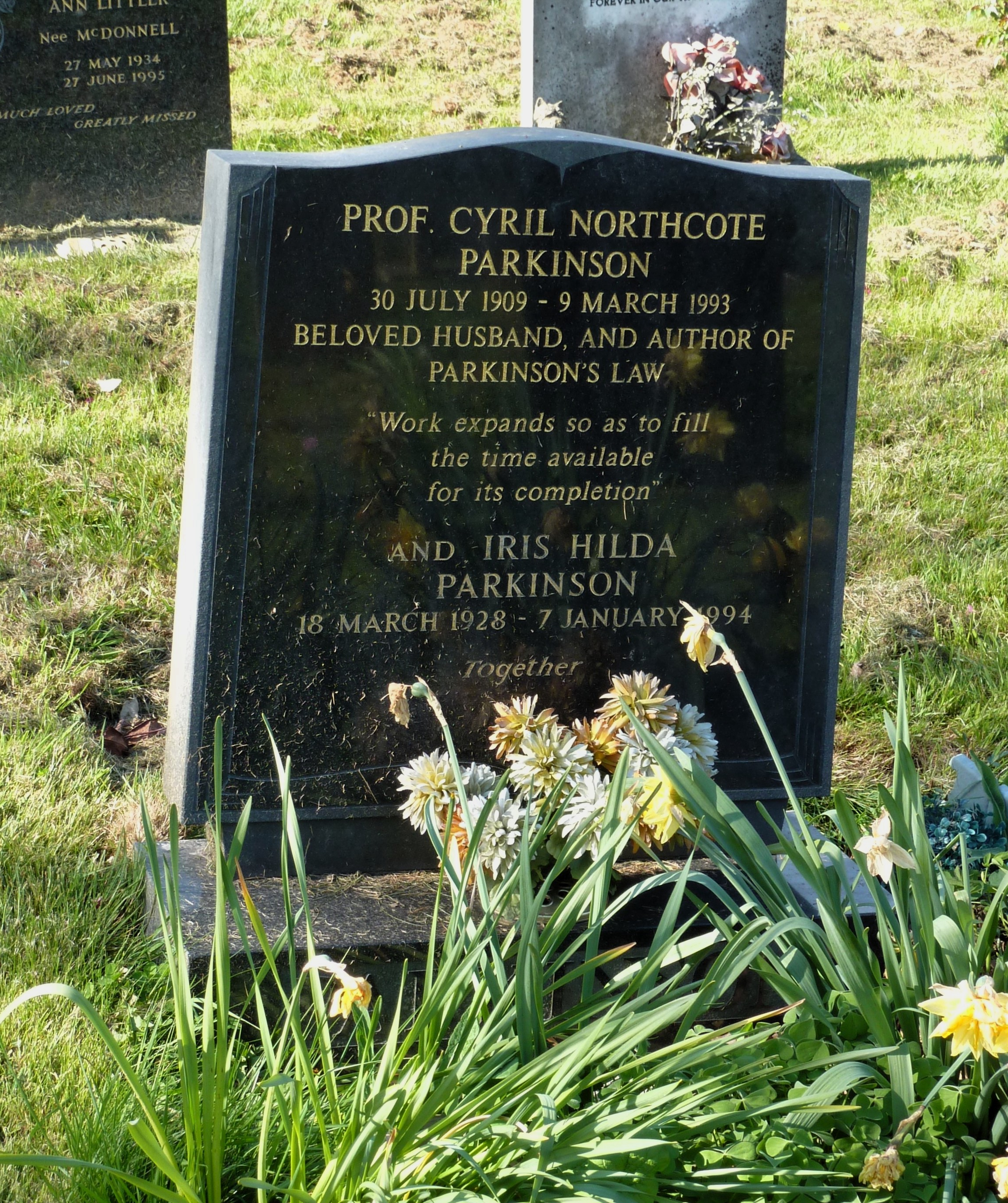
Parkinson's grave at Canterbury City Cemetery in 2017

== Published works ==
Richard Delancey series of naval novels (pub. date, internal order)

- The Devil to Pay. London: John Murray (1973, #2)
- The Fireship. London: John Murray (1975, #3)
- Touch and Go. London: John Murray (1977, #4)
- Dead Reckoning. London: John Murray (1978, #6)
- So Near, So Far. London: John Murray (1981, #5)
- The Guernseyman. London: John Murray (1982, #1)

Other nautical fiction

- Manhunt (1990)

Other fiction

- Ponies Plot. London: John Murray ISBN 978-0-7195-0010-7. (1965)

Biographies of fictional characters

- The Life and Times of Horatio Hornblower (1970)
- Jeeves: A Gentleman's Personal Gentleman (1979)

Naval history

- Edward Pellew, Viscount Exmouth, Admiral of the Red. London: Methuen & Co. (1934)
- Trade in the Eastern Seas, 1793–1813. Cambridge: Cambridge University Press, 1937. ISBN 978-0-521-05922-0
- The Trade Winds, Trade in the French Wars 1793–1815 (1948)
- Portsmouth Point: The British Navy in Fiction, 1793–1815. Liverpool: University Press of Liverpool (1948)
- Samuel Walters, Lieut. RN (1949)
- War in the Eastern Seas, 1793–1815. London: George Allen & Unwin (1954)
- British Intervention in Malaya, 1867–1877 (1960)
- Britannia Rules: The Classic Age of Naval History, 1793–1815 (1977)

Other history

- The Rise of the Port of Liverpool (1952)
- A Short History of Malaya. Singapore: Donald Moore, 1954
- The Evolution of Political Thought (1958)
- East and West (1963)
- The Fur-lined Mousetrap (1972)
- The Defenders (script for a son et lumière in Guernsey, 1975)
- Gunpowder, Treason and Plot (1978)

Business & Management, Satire

- Parkinson's Law, or The Pursuit of Progress. Boston: Houghton Mifflin, 1957; London: John Murray 1958 ISBN 978-0-14-118685-6
- The Law and the Profits. Boston: Houghton Mifflin, 1960; London: John Murray, 1960. ISBN 978-0-395-08065-8.
- In-Laws and Outlaws. Boston: Houghton Mifflin, 1962; London: John Murray, 1962. ISBN 978-0-395-08066-5.
- Parkinsanities. London: John Murray, 1965.
- Left Luggage: From Marx to Wilson. London: John Murray, 1967. ISBN 978-0-7195-1770-9.
- Mrs. Parkinson's Law: And Other Studies in Domestic Science. London: John Murray, 1968. ISBN 978-0-7195-1828-7.
- The Law of Delay: Interviews and Outerviews. London: John Murray, 1970. ISBN 978-0-7195-2070-9.
- Big Business. London: Weidenfeld & Nicolson, 1974. ISBN 978-0-297-76781-7.
- How to Get to the Top. London: Pan Books, 1974. ISBN 978-0-330-24158-8.
- The Law, or Still in Pursuit. London: John Murray, 1979. ISBN 978-0-7195-3682-4.
- The Management Jungle. London: Vane, 1984. ISBN 978-0-7163-0487-7.

Audio recordings

- Discusses Political Science with Julian H. Franklin (10 LPs) (1959)
- Explains "Parkinson's Law" (1960)
