= History of the English language (education) =

In English-language education, history of the English language (HEL) is a commonly required class for students in English studies and Education, though in the nineteenth and early twentieth century it was often required of all US college students.

== Content ==
Since HEL is often the only linguistics class required of English majors and Education students, it usually includes a basic introduction to linguistic concepts and theories (on phonetics, dialects, language families, etc.) as well as the historical stages of English--Old English, Middle English, Early Modern English, and Modern English.

Among the topics which may be taught in HEL are the following: origin and development of the language; vocabulary and etymology; meaning and expression; the role of reference books and dictionaries; varieties of spoken English.

== History and place in the curriculum ==
The need for HEL, as perceived by college professors and (English) department heads, was found to vary widely in a poll of department heads done in 1952. The poll asked heads to comment on the selection of language courses they'd require an MA candidate who applies for a teaching position to have taken; of 46 heads, 20 marked HEL, more than any other option (including advanced grammar, Old English, Chaucer, etc.). The author of the study noted that at the time no graduate courses in language study were required for the MA programs at many notable institutions, including Cornell, Johns Hopkins, Ohio State, and Penn State. The occasional passionate plea is made to promote HEL—J. E. Graves notes in a 1956 article in College English that proper courses in HEL are necessary for any future English teacher, and bemoans the perceived shoving aside of "language study in high school with non-rigorous semantics and 'learning situations.'" One such plea came in 1961 from Albert C. Baugh, professor of English at the University of Pennsylvania and author of A History of the English Language, who "justified" HEL by arguing that it teaches skills necessary for teachers of literature who often have students read older texts (Baugh cites Shakespeare throughout), including etymology (and the history of word changes), pronunciation and accentuation, and grammar and idiom.

Many, though by no means all, scholars of education suggest the importance of HEL. Marcia Henry, taking the Orton-Gillingham approach for dyslexic children as a structural starting point, argues that teaching the subject aids students in decoding and spelling.

In the field of English education, a field now often referred to as English Language Arts in which HEL is often required, the position of history of the English language is tenuous: it is not universally acknowledged that elementary and high-school students need to be taught anything about the subject. James Ney, a linguist at Arizona State University, argues that the shift in contemporary linguistics toward transformational grammar has taken attention away from historical linguistics. Ney's study of high-school textbooks suggested that history of English only takes up a minute amount of coverage; if it is there at all, it pertains to etymology and dictionary usage. Though some curriculum proposals (some of which very ambitious; Ney singles out the 1968 Atlanta Regional Curriculum Project) did promote a more rigorous study of the subject in elementary and high school, no discernible impact seems to have been made on actual school curricula.

== Notable textbooks ==
- Algeo, John: The Origins and Development of the English Language
  - 6th ed., 2010 (Wadsworth), a continuation of the book of the same title written by Thomas Pyles in the 1960s. Intermediate editions were published as "Pyles and Algeo"
- Baugh, Albert Croll and Thomas Cable: A History of the English Language
  - 6th ed., 2013 (Longman); from the 3rd ed., 1978, continues the same title by Baugh
  - 1st ed., 1935 (D. Appleton-Century Company), Baugh
- Hogg, Richard Hogg and David Denison: A History of the English Language
  - 1st ed., 2008 (Cambridge UP)
- Millward, C.M. and Mary Hayes: A Biography of the English Language
  - 3rd ed., 2011 (Wadsworth), a continuation of the book of the same title by Millward (2nd, 1996)
