= Hattendorf Prize =

The Hattendorf Prize
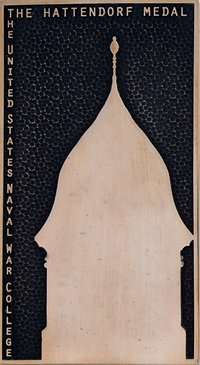
- Awarded for: Distinguished Original Research in Maritime History
- Country: United States
- Presented by: Naval War College
- First award: 2011
- Website: Naval War College website

The Hattendorf Prize for Distinguished Original Research in Maritime History is awarded by the United States Naval War College for distinguished academic achievement in publishing original research that contributes to a deeper historical understanding of the broad context and interrelationships involved in the roles, contributions, limitations, and uses of the sea services in history. The prize is awarded approximately every two years and consists of a $10,000 cash prize, a specially designed bronze medal, and a citation. The Prize Laureate is expected to deliver a lecture at the United States Naval War College on the occasion of the award.

== Prize ==
The Hattendorf Prize was established on 7 December 2010 and first awarded in 2011. It was permanently endowed through the Naval War College Foundation. The Hattendorf Prize reflects the essence of Professor John B. Hattendorf's professional values and goals for this field of historical study during the years of his service as the Naval War College's Ernest J. King Professor of Maritime History: to serve the Navy by improving the quality and range of scholarship in maritime history, striving to engage globally with an appreciation for scholarship in different languages and from different national, cultural, and regional perspectives, and to see maritime history as a broad field in global history that builds on insights that cut across traditional academic and national boundaries.

== Hattendorf Prize Medal ==
The Hattendorf Prize Medal was designed by Anna Maria Hattendorf (AB, magna cum laude with high honors, Hobart and William Smith Colleges (2002); MFA, Savannah College of Art and Design). The cast bronze medal is five inches (130 mm) tall and two inches (51 mm) wide. It depicts a stylized image of the cupola of Luce Hall, the first purpose-built building of the Naval War College, built in 1892 and first used during the College presidency of Alfred Thayer Mahan. This building is part of the National Historic Landmark site and this image connects the medal to the long tradition of historical research and scholarship at the Naval War College that goes back to the days of College founder Rear Admiral Stephen B. Luce and his successor, Alfred Thayer Mahan. The stylized image of the cupola suggests the new results that come from original historical research, while the rectangular shape is reminiscent of a book-plate.

== Laureates ==
- 2011 – Dr. N. A. M. Rodger, All Souls College, Oxford
- 2014 – Professor Paul Kennedy, Yale University
- 2016 – Captain Dr. Werner Rahn, Federal German Navy (Retired)
- 2018 – Professor Geoffrey Till, King's College, London
- 2021 – Rear Admiral James Goldrick, Royal Australian Navy (Ret.)
- 2024 — Professor Andrew Lambert, King's College London
- 2026 – Professor Barry Strauss, Cornell University and The Hoover Institution.

== See also ==
- List of history awards
