= Naval War College Foundation =

The Naval War College Foundation was established in 1969 and chartered under the tax laws of the United States as a non-profit 501(c)(3) charitable corporation in the state of Rhode Island to provide private financial support for the activities of the United States Naval War College. President and CEO of the foundation is retired United States Navy Captain George E. Lang Jr..

== History ==
The establishment of the Naval War College Foundation was an initiative of Vice Admiral Richard G. Colbert during his term as President of the Naval War College. In 1969, on Colbert's recommendation, Secretary of the Navy John H. Chafee approved the establishment of the Foundation and it was chartered in the State of Rhode Island. John Nicholas Brown, a prominent Rhode Island philanthropist and a former Assistant Secretary of the Navy for Air, became the Foundation's first president and Rear Admiral Richard W. Bates, who had been long served on the Naval War College faculty, became its first executive director. By its charter, the Foundation could support activities and projects which the President of the Naval War College approved to carry that would benefit the college, but could not otherwise be funded officially.

On 10 June 2026, the Foundation dedicated the Andrew J. Zimbelmann Endowed Chair for Leadership, Ethics, and Character attended by chairman of the Board of Trustees, retired United States Navy Rear Admiral A.B. Cruz III.

== Current activities ==
Contributions from individuals and corporate members provide the Foundation's funding, supplemented by grants from other foundations and organizations. The Foundation uses its funds to enrich and to further enhance the Naval War College's educational programs. Among its current primary activities are:

- Enhancing public awareness of the Naval War College's purpose, activities, and achievements.
- Supporting the Naval War College Distinguished Graduate Leadership Award.
- Publishing a newsletter for members, The Bridge
- Providing financial support activities at the college for which government funds are not available, including support for faculty research, curriculum development, endowing academic chairs, speakers for the public lecture series, funding academic awards, and providing document and artifact acquisition for the college library and the Naval War College Museum.
- Providing support for symposia and conferences, including the annual Professional Ethics Conference, the annual Current Strategy Forum as well as present and future worldwide security conferences and workshops on topical issues.
- Assisting the Naval War College to maintain an active alumni program.
- Operating a Store in the Naval War College Museum.
- Funding the Hattendorf Prize for Distinguished Original Research in Maritime History

The Foundation’s highest honor is the Sentinel of the Sea Award, which recognizes a distinguished American citizen whose career and life reflects the traditions and values of the United States Naval War College. In 2025, the award was presented to President Carter.
