= Albert C. Baugh =

American linguist

- Born: Albert Croll Baugh; February 26, 1891; Philadelphia, Pennsylvania, U.S.
- Died: March 21, 1981 (aged 90); University of Pennsylvania Hospital, West Philadelphia, Pennsylvania, U.S.
- Education: University of Pennsylvania (MA, PhD)
- Occupations: Linguist; professor
- Spouse: Nita Scudder
- Children: 2, including Daniel A.

Albert Croll Baugh (February 26, 1891 – March 21, 1981) was a professor of English at the University of Pennsylvania, best known as the author of a textbook for History of the English language (HEL). His A History of the English Language was first published in 1935 and praised as "worthy to take a place with the other great histories of single languages". It was revised by Baugh for a second edition published in 1957 and it remains in print, edited by Thomas Cable (by Baugh and Cable from the third edition, 1978).

== Biography ==
Baugh was born in Philadelphia, earned his Master of Arts (M.A.) and Ph.D. degrees from the University of Pennsylvania, and taught in its English department from 1912, as a reader, to 1961.

Baugh was elected to the American Philosophical Society in 1946.

Baugh died at the University of Pennsylvania Hospital on March 21, 1981 at age 90. He was survived by his wife, formerly Nita Scudder, and two sons. One of his sons was the noted historian of British naval administration, Daniel A. Baugh of Cornell University.

== Selected works ==
- A Literary History Of England (Appleton-Century-Crofts, 1948), editor — Baugh wrote the second of four parts, "The Middle English Period, 1100–1500"
- A History of the English Language (D. Appleton-Century Company, 1935) — six editions to 2013, the last four by Baugh and Thomas Cable

== See also ==
- Composition studies
- Middle English literature
