= Duke of Westminster's Medal for Military Literature =

The Duke of Westminster's Medal for Military Literature was awarded by the Royal United Services Institute for Defence and Security Studies, (the RUSI), Whitehall, London. Awarded annually from 1997 to 2016, the Medal was given to honour a living author who has published a notable original contribution to the fields of defences studies and international security affairs. This award has been superseded by the Duke of Wellington Medal for Military History as of 2018.

== The Duke of Westminster's Medallists ==
- 1997: Andrew Gordon: The Rules of the Game: Jutland and the British Naval Command
- 1998: Hew Strachan: The Politics of the British Army
- 1999: John Keegan: The First World War
- 2000: Michael Hickey: The Korean War: The West confronts Communism
- 2001: Norman Friedman: The Fifty-Year War: Conflict and Strategy in the Cold War
- 2002: Sir Percy Cradock: Know Your Enemy: How the Joint Intelligence Committee Saw the World
- 2003: Marrack Goulding: Peacemonger
- 2004: Gerard DeGroot: The Bomb, a Life
- 2005: Nicholas Rodger: The Command of the Ocean: A Naval History of Britain 1649–1815
- 2006: R. J. B. Knight: The Pursuit of Victory: The Life and Achievement of Horatio Nelson
- 2007: Aleksandr Fursenko and Timothy Naftali: Khrushchev's Cold War: The Inside Story of an American Adversary
- 2008: Chris Bellamy: Absolute War: Soviet Russia in the Second World War
- 2009: Sir Lawrence Freedman: A Choice of Enemies: America Confronts the Middle East
- 2010: Antony Beevor: D-Day: The Battle for Normandy
- 2011: Sir Rodric Braithwaite: Afgantsy: The Russians in Afghanistan, 1979–89
- 2012: Sir Max Hastings: All Hell Let Loose: The World at War 1939–1945
- 2013: Anne Applebaum: Iron Curtain: The Crushing of Eastern Europe 1944–56
- 2014: Rana Mitter China’s War with Japan 1937-1945: The Struggle for Survival
- 2015: Lord Peter Hennessy and James Jinks: The Silent Deep: The Royal Navy Submarine Service since 1945
