= Richard Hill (Royal Navy officer) =

English Royal Navy admiral (1929–2017)

Rear-Admiral Richard Hill
- Born: 25 March 1929; Merton, Surrey, England
- Died: 25 March 2017 (aged 88); Bishops Waltham, Hampshire, England
- Military career
- Allegiance: United Kingdom
- Branch: Royal Navy
- Service years: 1942–1983
- Rank: Rear-Admiral

Rear-Admiral John Richard Hill (25 March 1929 – 25 March 2017) was a rear-admiral in the Royal Navy, a former chief executive of the Middle Temple, author, and editor of many books on naval affairs.

== Early life and education ==
Richard Hill was born in Merton, Surrey, the son of Stanley Hill and May Henshaw Hill: he entered the Royal Naval College, Dartmouth, in 1942 and became a sub-lieutenant in 1946.

== Naval career ==
Richard Hill went to sea in 1946 and served mainly in destroyers and frigates, specializing in navigation up to the age of thirty-three. He served as a sub-lieutenant on the China Station from 1946 to 1947, before attending his sub-lieutenant's courses from 1947 to 1949. Promoted to lieutenant, he served in HMS Gambia in 1950, HMS Chevron in 1950 to 1952, HMS Tintagel Castle from 1952 to 1954 and then served ashore as a Navigation Specialist at HMS Dryad in 1954, before returning to sea in HMS Cardigan Bay in 1954 to 1956, HMS Albion in 1956 to 1958, and HMS Roebuck in 1958 to 1959. As a lieutenant-commander, he served at Pembroke Dockyard in 1959 to 1960 and in HMS Duchess in 1960 to 1962.

Following his promotion to commander, he served mainly in appointments in the Ministry of Defence between 1963 and 1969, attending the Imperial Defence College from 1965 to 1967. In 1969 to 1971, he served at HMS Dryad. In 1972, he was appointed Defence Fellow of King's College London, where he wrote a thesis on 'The Rule of Law at Sea.' On promotion to captain, he returned to the Ministry of Defence from 1973 to 1975, then he was posted abroad to The Netherlands, where he served as Defence and Naval Attaché at The Hague from 1975 to 1977. Promoted to commodore in 1977, he returned to the Ministry of Defence until promoted to rear-admiral in 1981; he served as Flag Officer, Admiralty Interview Board from 1981 to 1983. He retired from the Royal Navy as a rear-admiral in 1983.

== Later career ==
Following his retirement as a serving officer, Hill became under-treasurer, the chief executive, of the Middle Temple, one of the Inns of Court, and held that post for ten years until his retirement in 1994, when he was made Hon. Bencher, 1994. He served as Secretary of the Council of Inns of Court, 1987–1993.

He served as editor of the Naval Review, 1983–2002 and as its reviews editor from 2002. He was a member of Council, Greenwich Forum, from 1983, and served on the Board of War Studies, University of London, 1986–1994; member of Council, Foundation for International Security, from 1987; member of Council, 1993-1997, and Vice President, 1997-2001, of the Navy Records Society; member of Council, 1993–1994, and Chairman, 1994–1999, of the Society for Nautical Research. Trustee, 1994–1999, and Vice President, 2002, of the Royal Naval Museum, Portsmouth.

In 2000, the British Maritime Foundation awarded Admiral Hill the Mountbatten Maritime Prize.

== Personal life and death ==
Hill married Patricia Sales in 1956; they had three children. He died from bronchopneumonia and aortic stenosis at his home in Bishops Waltham, Hampshire, on 25 March 2017, his 88th birthday.

== Published works ==
Rear-Admiral Hill published articles in a number of professional journals, including Survival, Navy International, Brassey's Annual, NATO's 15 Nations, Naval Review, Naval Forces. He has contributed to the Oxford Dictionary of National Biography, for which he wrote biographies of Sir Harold Burrough, Sir John Hayes, Admiral of the Fleet Lord Lewin, Vonla McBride, Sir Roderick Douglas Macdonald, Sir Ian McIntosh, and Sir Bernard Rawlings.

- French strategy and its political bases (1966)
- The Royal Navy, today and tomorrow (1983)
- Anti-submarine warfare (1984)
- Air defence at sea (1984)
- British sea power in the 1980s (1985)
- Maritime strategy for medium powers (1986)
- Arms control at sea (1989)
- The Oxford illustrated history of the Royal Navy, general editor, J. R. Hill; consultant editor, Bryan Ranft (1995)
- The prizes of war : the naval prize system in the Napoleonic Wars, 1793-1815 (1998)
- Maritime operations in peace : drug interdiction, disaster relief, suppression of piracy, Stephen Jermy, John Lippiett, Richard Hill. (1998).
- War at sea in the ironclad age (2000)
- Lewin of Greenwich: the authorised biography of Admiral of the Fleet Lord Lewin (2000)
- Maritime Britain (2005)
- A Light on the Shore (2009)
