= Sydney Brooks =

British writer and critic

Sydney Brooks (1872–1937) was a British writer and critic. He was a frequent contributor to the Saturday Review and was in England writing reviews from late 1895 to January 1896, when he left to visit Chicago. In America, his critical reviews and writings were sold to publications such as Harper's Magazine.

Brooks was a notable passenger who was aboard the SS Tuscania, a luxury ocean liner of the Cunard subsidiary Anchor Line, when it was torpedoed in 1918 by the German U-boat UB-77 while carrying American troops to Europe and sank with a loss of 210 lives.
