= The Fireship =

Novel series by C. Northcote Parkinson

- First edition cover
- Author: C. Northcote Parkinson
- Publisher: John Murray
- Publication date: 1975
- ISBN: 978-0-719-53175-0

The Fireship is a 1975 novel by British naval historian C. Northcote Parkinson, one of a series of nautical novels by the author. It is set in the late 18th century, when Britain was at war with Revolutionary France. Parkinson's hero is a junior naval officer. Unlike many fictional officers Parkinson's hero, Richard Delancey, does not have any powerful patrons to ease his way to promotion.

In The Devil to Pay, the first novel Parkinson wrote about Delancey, his hero goes through a long series of adventures before he can find himself an appointment. In The Fireship Delancey has a position. He is the second lieutenant of HMS Glatton, a converted vessel from the British East India Company, fitted with an experimental armament consisting of all short-range, large-caliber carronades.

HMS Glatton is part of Admiral Adam Duncan's fleet blockading the Batavian Republic.

== Plot summary ==
In 1797, the year the novel begins, the Royal Navy was beset by two serious mutinies.

The main grievance of the mutineers were over pay and working conditions. The sailors hadn't received a raise in decades, whereas the soldiers had just received a significant raise. Discipline was harsh and most of the seamen were conscripts. Unsurprisingly, Admiral Duncan's fleet was seriously affected.

Quick thinking on the part of the first lieutenant of Delancey's ship prevents the mutiny from taking hold, and the Glatton is able to join Admiral Duncan's ship, and bluff until the rest of the fleet joins him. But he had to shoot a mutineer to do so.

Since the mutineer's death occurred in port, the first lieutenant has to stay ashore, and Delancey has to assume his duties. He is acting first lieutenant when the Dutch fleet leaves port and is engaged by Admiral Duncan's fleet.

The Battle of Camperdown is a decisive victory. Every ship's first lieutenant is to be promoted to commander. But Delancey's colleague has been acquitted, and the Captain wants him to receive the promotion, not Delancey. The Captain wants to make sure the trial does not put a black mark against this loyal officer's career — And the first lieutenant, after all had the primary responsibility for training the crew so that their performance was exemplary.

Delancey is bitter, but he does receive command of a fireship. He makes the most of this, by researching the history of fireships. Fire was a very serious danger aboard sailing ships. Their upper works could be bone dry, and very highly flammable materials, like pitch, were used in their construction. Fireships were ships intended to be sailed against enemy fleets at anchor, loaded with incendiaries. Big hooks are hung from her upper works, to entangle with the enemies ship's rigging. When they get close to the enemy fleet, the incendiaries are set alight.

Delancey learns that if his vessel is destroyed while burning an enemy vessel, he can count on promotion.

It seems a long shot. But a French expedition to stir up sedition in rural Ireland provides him with his opportunity.
