= Bryan Ranft =

English historian (1917–2001)

Bryan Ranft (14 July 1917 – 14 April 2001) was a historian of the Royal Navy, who served as Professor of History and International Affairs at the Royal Naval College, Greenwich, 1967–1977.

== Early life and education ==
Ranft was educated at Manchester Grammar School and Balliol College, Oxford. During World War II, he joined the Royal Artillery, rising to the rank of major. Well along in his career, Ranft completed his D.Phil. degree in history at Oxford University in 1967 with a thesis on The Naval Defence of British Sea-borne Trade, 1860–1905.

== Academic career ==
Upon leaving the Royal Artillery, Ranft joined the staff of the Royal Naval College, Greenwich and rose to become Professor of History and International Affairs. He was a visiting fellow at King's College London, where he taught naval history to several generations of postgraduate students, and was appointed visiting professor in 1982.

== Published works ==
- The Vernon Papers, edited by B. McL. Ranft. Publications of the Navy Records Society, vol. 99. [London]: Printed for the Navy Records Society, 1958.
- Greenwich: Palace, Hospital, College, by Christopher Lloyd; revised by Bryan Ranft. London: Royal Naval College, 1969.
- Technical Change and British Naval Policy, 1860–1939, edited by Bryan Ranft. London : Hodder and Stoughton, 1977.
- The Sea in Soviet Strategy, Bryan Ranft and Geoffrey Till. London: Macmillan, 1983, 1989.
- Ironclad to Trident: 100 years of Defence Commentary. Brassey's 1886–1986, edited by Bryan Ranft. London: Brassey's, 1986.
- The Beatty Papers: Selections From the Private and Official Correspondence of Admiral of the Fleet Earl Beatty, edited by B. McL. Ranft. Two volumes. Aldershot: Scolar Press for the Navy Records Society, 1989–1993.
- The Oxford Illustrated History of the Royal Navy, general editor, J. Richard Hill; consultant editor, Bryan Ranft. Oxford : Oxford University Press, 1995.
- "Beatty, David, first Earl Beatty (1871–1936)’ in the Oxford Dictionary of National Biography, 2004
- The Development of British Naval Thinking: Essays in Memory of Bryan Ranft, edited by Geoffrey Till. London : Routledge, 2006.

== Sources ==
- Obituary "Professor Bryan Ranft: Historian of the Royal Navy", Guardian, 25 May 2001.
