= Pyrates Royale =

The Pyrates Royale are a shanty band, performing together since 1987. They specialize in nautical and folk songs with a comic flare. The group and its members are local celebrities in the Maryland, Delaware, and Washington, D.C. area. Many of their songs are sea shanties, but they also perform other traditional drinking songs and ballads. The band plays pubs, breweries, distilleries, festivals, and all around the region.

The band was formed in 1987 with original members Brad Howard, Tim Shaw, Erik Booker and Evan Steinhart. The current band lineup includes founders Howard, Shaw and Booker, as well as long time members Jenn Garman, Damon Hersh, Matt Salisbury, and Claudia Harrison.
