= Sarah R. Palmer =

Sarah R. Palmer (born 1943) is emerita professor of maritime history at the University of Greenwich. Palmer is a specialist in commercial shipping, port development and international maritime policy from the 19th century onwards.

== Selected publications ==
- Palmer, S. (2011) The maritime world in historical perspective. International Journal of Maritime History, XXIII, pp. 1–12.
- Palmer, S. (2008) British Shipping from the Late 19th Century to the Present.In: Lewis, R., Fischer and Lange, E. (eds.) International Merchant Shipping in the Nineteenth and Twentieth Centuries: the Comparative Dimension. Research in Maritime History, 37. St John's, Newfoundland.
- Palmer, S. (2008) Kent and the Sea. Archaeologia Cantiana, CXXVIII, pp. 263–279.
- Palmer, S. (2006) Afterword. In: Harcourt, F. Flagships of Imperialism: the P&O Company and the Politics of Empire. Manchester: Manchester University Press.
- Palmer, S. (2005) Leaders and followers: the development of international maritime policy in the 19th Century. International Journal of Maritime History, XVII, pp. 1–11.
- Palmer, S. (2004) The Labour Process in the 19th Century Port of London. In: Barzman, J., and Barre, E. (eds.) Environments Portuaire. Le Havre: Le Havre Press.
- Palmer, S. (2003) Port economics in an historical context: the 19th century Port of London. International Journal of Maritime History, XV, pp. 27–67.
- Palmer, S. (2000) Women in the War. In: Wrigley, C.J. (ed.) The International Impact of the First World War. London: Routledge.
- Palmer, S. (2000) Ports 1840–1970. In: Daunton, M.J., (ed.) The Urban History of Britain 3. Cambridge University Press.
- Palmer, S. (1993) Shipbuilding in Southeast England. In Ville, S. (ed.) Shipbuilding in the United Kingdom in the Nineteenth Century: A Regional Approach. St John's, Newfoundland.
- Politics, Shipping and the Repeal of the Navigation Laws. Manchester, 1990.
