= R. J. B. Knight =

British naval historian

Roger John Beckett Knight (born 11 April 1944) is a British naval historian of the 18th century. He is a former Deputy Director of the National Maritime Museum at Greenwich, and published author, including a biography of Admiral Lord Nelson.

== Early life and education ==
The son of Lieutenant-Commander John B. Knight of Bromley, Kent, and Alyson Yvonne née Nunn, Roger Knight was educated at Tonbridge School, received a B.A. and M.A. at Trinity College, Dublin, Professional Graduate Certificate in Education (PGCE) at the University of Sussex; and his Ph.D. from University College, London in 1972 with a thesis on "The Royal Dockyards in England at the time of the American War of Independence".

== Professional career ==
At the National Maritime Museum, Greenwich, he served as Deputy Curator of Manuscripts, 1974–77; Curator of Manuscripts, 1977–81; Deputy Head, Books and Manuscripts, 1981–84; Head Information Project Group, 1984–86; Head, Documentation Division, 1986–88; Head, Collections Division and Chief Curator, 1988–93; Deputy Director and Head, Display Division, 1993–95; Deputy Director and Head, Information Division, 1995–97; and Deputy Director, 1997–2000. Upon his retirement from the National Maritime Museum in 2001, he was appointed Visiting Professor of Naval History in the Greenwich Maritime Institute and regularly teaches on the post-graduate MA in Maritime History course, University of Greenwich. In 2005, he was appointed Professor of Naval History and he published a single volume biography on Admiral Lord Nelson.

From 2006 to 2009 he led a research project at the University of Greenwich on how the Royal Navy fed itself during the French Revolutionary and Napoleonic Wars.

== Distinctions and awards ==
He is a Fellow of the Royal Historical Society and has served as a member of council of the Society for Nautical Research, 1975–79, and as Vice President, 1992–2006. In addition, he has served on the Council and has been senior Vice President of the Navy Records Society.

For his 2005 book, The pursuit of victory: the life and achievement of Horatio Nelson, Knight was awarded the Mountbatten Maritime Prize, The Duke of Westminster's Medal for Military Literature, and the Anderson Medal of the Society of Nautical Research. In June 2014, the National Maritime Museum presented him its Caird Medal.

In 2022, he was awarded Society for Nautical Research Anderson Medal for his study of convoys during the Napoleonic Wars.

== Published works ==
- Guide to the manuscripts in the National Maritime Museum Two vols. (1977–1980)
- The journal of Daniel Paine, 1794–1797 : together with documents illustrating the beginning of government boat-building and timber-gathering in New South Wales, 1795–1805, edited by R.J.B. Knight and Alan Frost (1983)
- Portsmouth dockyard papers, 1774–1783: the American war: a calendar (1987)
- Shipbuilding timber for the British Navy : parliamentary papers, 1729–1792: a facsimile reproduction with an introduction by R.J.B. Knight (1993).
- The pursuit of victory : the life and achievement of Horatio Nelson (2005).
- Sustaining the Fleet, 1793–1815: War, the British Navy and the Contractor State, by Roger Knight and Martin Wilcox (2010)
- Knight, R. J.B. (1973). "THE INTRODUCTION OF COPPER SHEATHING INTO THE ROYAL NAVY, 1779–1786". The Mariner's Mirror. 59 (3): 299–309. doi:10.1080/00253359.1973.10657911. ISSN 0025-3359.
- Britain Against Napoleon: The Organization of Victory, 1793–1815 (2013).
- William IV (Penguin Monarchs) (2019)
- Knight, R. J. B. (2023). Convoys: the British struggle against Napoleonic Europe and America. New Haven: Yale University Press. ISBN 978-0-300-24697-1.

== Website ==
- www.rogerknight.org
