= R. C. Anderson =

English historian (1883–1976)

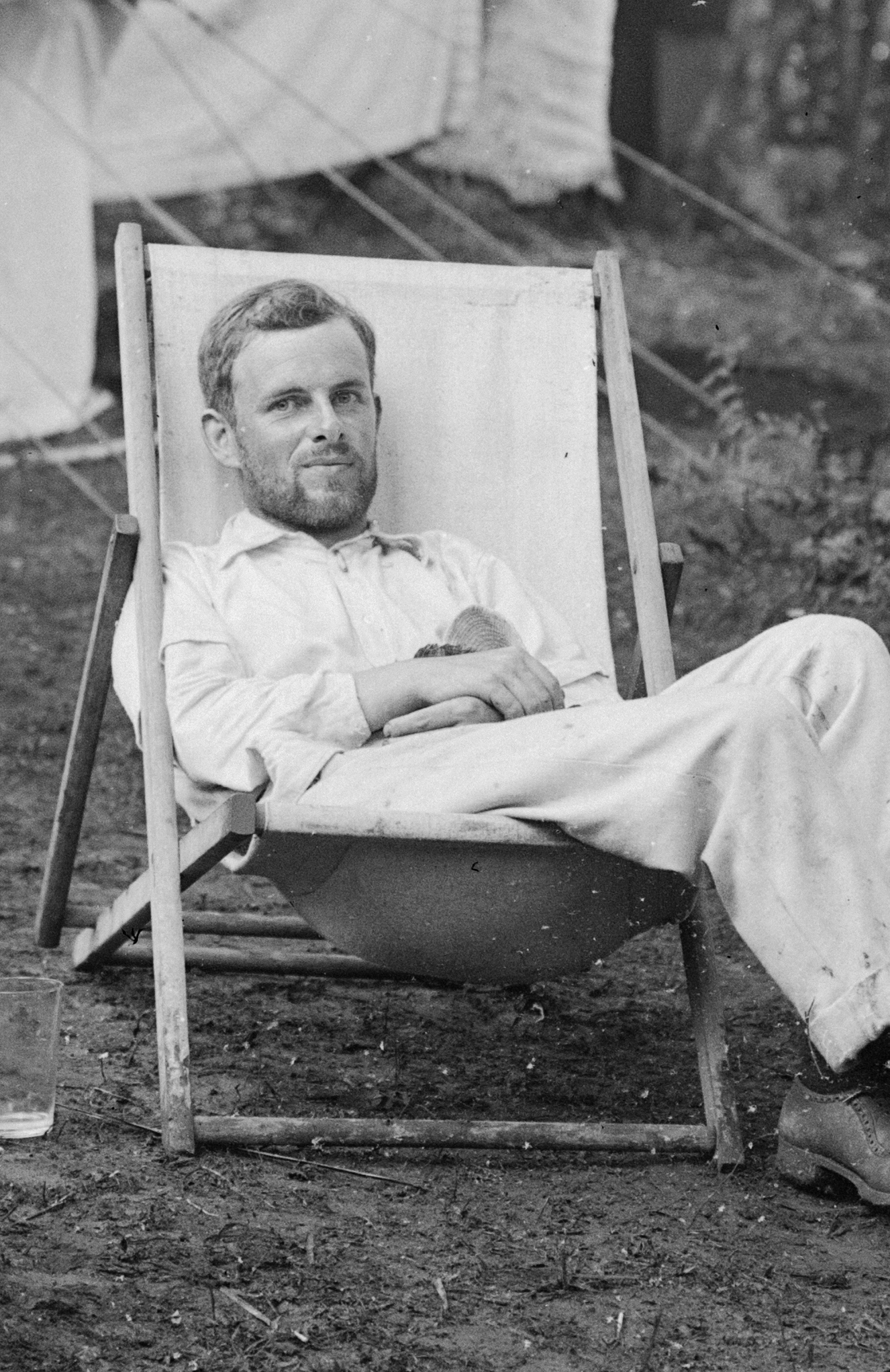
- Anderson in Vavaʻu, Tonga, as a part of an expedition to observe the Solar eclipse of April 28, 1911
- Born: July 23, 1883
- Died: October 2, 1976 (aged 93)

Academic background
- Education: Winchester College, and Clare College, Cambridge.

Roger Charles Anderson FSA (23 July 1883 – 2 October 1976) was an English maritime historian, collector, and a leading figure in the early years of the Society for Nautical Research and of the Navy Records Society. Four times editor of the Mariner's Mirror, Anderson was also a founder trustee, and later chairman of the board of trustees, of the National Maritime Museum, Greenwich. He was a Fellow of the Royal Historical Society, a Fellow of the Society of Antiquaries of London, and held the higher Doctor of Letters degree. In 2005, the Swedish naval historian Jan Glete characterised Anderson as "one of the most important naval historians of the twentieth century. He mainly wrote about early modern warship technology and used his linguistic skills to write books and essays based on the literature from several countries".

== Early life and education ==
Anderson was born on 23 July 1883. He was the only child of Edith Tayloe Anderson (1859–1938) and John Rodgerson Anderson (1845–1922) of Basset Wood, Southampton, and a partner in the London ship brokerage firm of Trinder, Anderson & Co. in the Australian trade. Anderson was educated at Winchester College and Clare College, Cambridge. In 1905, joined the Royal Naval Volunteer Reserve and served until 1911 as a midshipman and sub-lieutenant. During World War I, he returned to serve as a lieutenant and lieutenant-commander, spending a portion of his service time in motor launches at Gibraltar. As a lieutenant, RNVR, on 1 January 1916, he married Romola Urquhart Mackenzie, daughter of Robert Fowler Mackenzie of Mosslein, Whitstable, at St Alphage's Church, Seasalter, Whitstable, Kent. The couple had no children.

== Historical interests and activities ==
=== The Society for Nautical Research ===
Anderson's interest in sailing ships and their rigging led him to become one of the founder members of the Society for Nautical Research in 1910. In 1912, when the Society's journal, the Mariner's Mirror, ran into initial problems of finding material suitable to publish in a timely manner, Anderson was one of six men on the editorial committee who assumed the joint editorship from its first editor. Soon, this arrangement proved to be unworkable and Anderson became the sole editor by the acclamation of his colleagues in 1912. He remained editor until 1923, although publication was suspended during the war years. The Admiralty Librarian, W.G. Perrin succeeded Anderson as editor, turning the journal into a quarterly. With Perrin's sudden death in 1931–32, Anderson took over the editorship briefly until the new Admiralty Librarian David Bonner-Smith took up the editorial reins. On Bonner-Smith's resignation in 1939, Anderson became the editor for the third and final time, retaining the position through the Second World War until 1946. He subsequently produced a number of the Society's occasional publications and served as president of the Society from 1951 to 1960.

=== National Maritime Museum ===
Shortly after Geoffrey Callender's appointment as Professor of Naval History at the Royal Naval College, Greenwich in 1922, Callender began to promote the idea that the College's former naval museum that had originated with the Greenwich Naval Hospital's Collection, should be re-established for teaching purposes. The collection had been partially dispersed with some models going to the Imperial War Museum, but part of it remained available. By 1924, Callender had succeeded in establishing a committee of experts to oversee the management and display of the remaining collection. All of the committee members were associated with the College, except for Anderson, the sole outside expert. This collection soon formed the basis for Callender's suggestion in 1927 to the Society for Nautical Research that it take over the collection and house it in the Queen's House, after the Royal Hospital School vacated it to move to Holbrook. The Society enthusiastically took up the proposal and formally suggested that the museum become a national naval museum. Anderson became a member of the Museum's first board of directors when it was established in 1927. At this point, Anderson made it known that he was willing to bequeath his collection of ship models, naval signal books, manuscripts, and Willem van de Velde drawings, along with an endowment of £50,000. He became the second chairman of the board of Trustees, succeeding James Stanhope, 7th Earl Stanhope.

== Death, memorials, and legacy ==
Anderson died on 2 October 1976, aged 93. He was buried with his parents in the churchyard at St Nicolas' Church, North Stoneham, Eastleigh, Hampshire. A Memorial Service was held in the Chapel of the Royal Naval College, Greenwich. In an obituary published in the Mariner's Mirror, George Naish of the National Maritime Museum wrote of his published works, "His writings were often wantonly dull but always thoroughly trustworthy. He thrived on facts and figures". Anderson's memorial, Naish wrote, "is in the galleries and library of the Museum, well stocked with the books and ship models he loved so well and had in many cases donated".

On his death, Anderson left the Society of Nautical Research, the Navy Records Society, and the National Maritime Museum as joint residuary legatees. In 1984, his wife, Romola Anderson, gave the Navy Records Society a generous gift. As a result, the latter dedicated the fifth volume of its Naval Miscellany series, edited by the Society's Hon. Secretary N. A. M. Rodger, "To the Memory of R.C. Anderson, Historian and Benefactor". As Captain A. B. Sainsbury wrote in his history of the Society's first hundred years, "Dr. R. C. Anderson must be distinguished among individual benefactors, and the Society recognized his considerable generosity by dedicating a volume to his memory, a compliment intended to be as particular as Pitt escorting Nelson to his carriage". On the death of Romola Anderson in June 1990, the Navy Records Society received a sum of about £70,000.

In 1997, the Society of Nautical Research created the Anderson Medal in memory of R. C. Anderson. There are two series of awards, the first is awarded to an exemplary volume on maritime history published during the previous year. The Society made its first award in this category to N. A. M. Rodger in 1998. The second series is awarded for lifetime achievement in maritime history. The Society made its first award in the lifetime achievement series in 2017 to John Hattendorf.

== Publications ==
In addition to the following books, Anderson contributed several articles to the English Historical Review and some thirty to the Mariner's Mirror, as well as an edited selection in the Navy Record's Society's Naval Miscellany, vol. IV.

- Canoeing and Camping Adventures (London, 1910).
- Naval Wars in the Baltic During the Sailing-ship Epoch, 1522–1850 (London, 1910; 1969).
- The Naval Pocket (1912–1915)
- A Treatise on Rigging Written About the Year 1625, from a manuscript at Petworth House, edited by R. C. Anderson ([Southampton, Eng.]: Society for Nautical Research, 1921).
- Letters of the Fifteenth and Sixteenth Centuries from the Archives of Southampton, edited by R.C. Anderson (Southampton: Cox & Sharland, 1921).
- The Assize of Bread Book, 1477–1517, edited by R. C. Anderson. (Southampton: Cox & Sharland, 1923)
- The Sailing-ship: Six Thousand Years of History, by Romola and R.C. Anderson (London: G. G. Harrap & Company Ltd. 1926; New York: Robert M. McBride, 1926; reprinted as A short history of the sailing ship New York: Dover, 1962).
- The book of examinations, 1601–1602: with a list of ships belonging to Southampton in the years 1570–1603, edited by R. C. Anderson (Southampton: Cox & Sharland, 1926).
- The Journal of Edward Montagu, 1st Earl of Sandwich, admiral and general at sea, 1659–1665, edited by R. C. Anderson. Publications of the Navy Records Society, v. 64 (London, 1929).
- The Book of Examinations and Depositions, 1622–1644, edited by R. C. Anderson (Southampton: Cox & Sharland, 1929–1936).
- The Rigging of Ships in the Days of the Spritsail Topmast 1600–1720 (Salem, Massachusetts: Marine Research Society, 1927; New York: Dover, 1994).
- Bibliography of Printed Books on Shipbuilding, Rigging, Seamanship and Kindred Subjects, of the Period of Wooden Sailing Ships and Galleys (1930)
- The Journals of Sir Thomas Allin, 1660–1678, edited by R. C. Anderson. Publications of the Navy Records Society, vols. 79, 80 (London, 1939–40). Publications of the Navy Records Society, vol. 101 (London, 1959).
- Journals and Narratives of the Third Dutch War, edited by R. C. Anderson. Publications of the Navy Records Society, vol. 86. ([London]: Navy Records Society, 1946).
- Index to the Mariner's Mirror, vols 1–35 (London: Society for Nautical Research, 1956).
- A Treatise on Shipbuilding and a Treatise on Rigging, Written About 1620–1625, edited by W. Salisbury and R.C. Anderson. Occasional publication, 6 (London: Society for Nautical Research, 1958).
- A Memoir of James Trevenen, edited by Christopher Lloyd and R. C. Anderson. Publications of the Navy Records Society, vol. 101 (London, 1959).
- Oared Fighting Ships From Classical Times to the Coming of Steam (London: P. Marshall, 1962; Kings Langley [Eng.]: Argus Books, 1976).
- List of English men-of-war, 1509–1649 ([London]: Society for Nautical Research, 1959).
- Naval wars in the Levant, 1559–1853 (Princeton: University Press, 1952)
- Catalogue of ship-models. Scale-models (London: National Maritime Museum, Greenwich, 1952).
- Seventeenth-century rigging: a handbook for model-makers (London: P. Marshall, 1955).
- List of English Naval Captains, 1642–60 (London: Society for Nautical Research, 1964).
- 60 Years in Small Boats (London: National Maritime Museum, 1984)
