= Paul G. Halpern =

American naval historian

Paul G. Halpern (born 27 January 1937) is a retired American educator, naval historian and documentary editor. His primary focus has been the history of the Royal Navy in the period surrounding the First World War and in Naval warfare in the Mediterranean during World War I.

== Early life and education ==
Halpern was born in New York City on 27 January 1937 to Harry and Teresa Ritter Halpern.

Paul Halpern graduated with honors with a Bachelor of Arts degree in history from the University of Virginia in 1958. He joined the United States Army and served from 1958 to 1960, reaching the grade of first lieutenant. On leaving military service, Halpern earned a Master of Arts degree in history at Harvard University in 1961 and, in 1966, a Ph.D. with a two-volume thesis, "The Mediterranean naval situation, 1912-1914".

== Career ==
Halpern spent his entire academic career as Florida State University in Tallahassee, Florida, beginning with his appointed to instructor in history in 1965 and subsequent promotions to assistant professor in 1966, associate professor in 1970, and full professor in 1974. He was named emeritus professor in 2005. In the academic year 1986–87, he served as visiting professor of strategy at the Naval War College in Newport, Rhode Island.

He served on the Council of the Navy Records Society in 1968–72, 1982–86, and 2010–14. In addition, he is a Fellow of the Royal Historical Society, a member of the American Historical Association, Naval Review, U.S. Naval Institute, Friends of the Imperial War Museum, Naval Historical Foundation, Society for Military History, Phi Beta Kappa, and Phi Eta Sigma.

== Honours ==
In describing his career of achievement in publishing six volumes of edited naval documents, "The Annual Report of the Council of the Navy Records Society" noted in 2016 that "Paul Halpern has served the Society notably". "Those who have edited a similar number are a distinguished group: Sir Julian Corbett, Michael Oppenheim, Professor David Syrett, and J. R. Tanner, while only Sir John Knox Laughton (with nine volumes) and the Admiralty Librarian David Bonner-Smith (with eight volumes) have outstripped him."

== Publications ==
- The Mediterranean Naval Situation, 1908-1914. Harvard Historical Studies, v. 86 (Cambridge, Ma., Harvard University Press, 1971). ISBN 9780674564626
- The Naval War in the Mediterranean, 1914-1918. (London : Allen & Unwin, 1987).ISBN 9780049400887
- The Royal Navy in the Mediterranean, 1915-1918, edited by Paul G. Halpern. Publications of the Navy Records Society, v. 126 (Aldershot, Hants; Brookfield, Vt.: Published by Temple Smith, Gower Pub. Co., for the Navy Records Society, 1987). ISBN 9780566054884
- The Keyes papers: selections from the private and official correspondence of Admiral of the Fleet Baron Keyes of Zeebrugge, edited by Paul G. Halpern. Publications of the Navy Records Society, v. 117, 121, 122 (London : Published by Allen & Unwin for the Navy Records Society, 1972–1981). ISBN 9780049421653
- A Naval history of World War I. (Annapolis, Md.: Naval Institute Press, 1994). ISBN 0870212664
- Anton Haus: Österreich-Ungarns Grossadmiral (Graz: Styria, 1998). ISBN 9783222125676
- The Battle of the Otranto Straits: controlling the gateway to the Adriatic in World War I. (Bloomington: Indiana University Press, 2004).ISBN 0253343798
- The Mediterranean Fleet, 1919-1929. Navy Records Society publications, v. 158 (Farnham, Surrey, and Burlington, Vt.: Ashgate Pub. Co., 2011). ISBN 9781409427568
- The Mediterranean Fleet, 1930-1939. Navy Records Society publications, v. 163 (Farnham, Surrey, and Burlington, Vt.: Ashgate Pub. Co., 2016).
