= Michael Lewis (naval historian) =

Royal Marines officer (1890–1970)

Michael Lewis CBE FSA FRHistS
- Born: 3 January 1890; Freeland, Oxfordshire, England
- Died: 27 February 1970 (aged 80)

Academic background
- Education: Uppingham School
- Alma mater: Trinity College, Cambridge

Academic work
- Discipline: History
- Sub-discipline: Naval history; Royal Navy; early modern history; late modern history
- Institutions: Royal Naval College, Osborne; Royal Naval College, Dartmouth; Royal Naval College, Greenwich

Michael Arthur Lewis, CBE, FSA, FRHistS (3 January 1890 – 27 February 1970) was a British naval historian, as well as a fiction writer, who was Professor of History and English at the Royal Naval College, Greenwich, between 1934 and 1955.

== Early life and education ==
Born at Freeland, Oxfordshire, Lewis was the second son of The Rev'd Victor Arthur Nicholas Lewis, of the Dower House, Freeland, a church of England clergyman, and his wife Mary Ann, daughter of Rev. Jonathan Clayton, a headmaster, and niece of the clergyman and Cambridge tutor Charles Clayton. The Lewis family were minor Carmarthenshire gentry, with a strong clerical tradition alongside farming, who had made money in inn-keeping; on his father's side Lewis descended from the sailor Sir Richard Hawkins and the judge Sir William Elias Taunton, whose father, also Sir William Elias Taunton, Clerk of the Peace of Oxfordshire and Town Clerk of Oxford, bought the Freeland Lodge estate near Eynsham, Oxfordshire where Lewis was born a century later. Lewis was educated at Uppingham School and studied at Trinity College, Cambridge, where he took a Bachelor of Arts degree with honours in 1912 and a Master of Arts in 1924.

During the First World War, he served in the Royal Marines. On 20 May 1918, he was made a temporary second lieutenant.

== Academic career ==
Lewis spent his entire 42-year academic career in English naval colleges. In 1913, he was appointed an assistant master at the Royal Naval College, Osborne, remaining there until 1920, when he was transferred to the Royal Naval College, Dartmouth. In 1922, he was appointed assistant head of history and English at Dartmouth. Shortly after his marriage, he was appointed Professor of History and English in 1934 at the Royal Naval College, Greenwich, a position he held until his retirement in 1955. While holding that position, he was Director of the Sub-lieutenants General Education Course, 1946–1955 at Greenwich. Additionally, he was lecturer in English to the Royal Navy Staff College, 1943–1957, and in Naval history, 1945–1953. He was lecturer in naval history to the Royal Navy Senior Officers War Course, 1947–1953.

Lewis was an active member of the Navy Records Society, serving on its publication committee and council from 1938, as well as becoming vice president from 1939. Equally active in the Society for Nautical Research, he was a member of council from 1935, vice president in 1946, chairman of council from 1951 to 1960 and president from 1960 to 1970. Additionally, he was a member of the HMS Victory Advisory Technical Committee from 1955.

In 1952–1953, Lewis was the introducer on British television for the American series of 26, one-half-hour television programmes on navies in the Second World War, Victory at Sea.

== Personal life ==
On 5 August 1933, Lewis married Muriel Doris Cruikshank, with whom he had a son, the historian of early railways Michael J. T. Lewis, and a daughter.

== Honours ==
In the 1954 New Year Honours, Lewis was appointed Commander of the Order of the British Empire (CBE) for his service as Professor of History and English, Royal Naval College, Greenwich. He was also an elected Fellow of the Society of Antiquaries of London (FSA) and Fellow of the Royal Historical Society (FRHistS).

== Published writings ==
=== Historical writings ===
- England's sea-officers: the story of the naval profession. London Allen & Unwin, 1939, 1948.
- British ships and British seamen. London: British Council, 1940; Translated as Britiske skip og britiske sjømenn , 1943; Britische schefen en Britische zeelieden, door Michael Lewis ... Vertaald door A. J. Staal. Geïllustreerde uitgave. (Herzien, 1943, 1945; Reprinted as The ships and seamen of Britain. London and New York: Pub. for the British Council by Longmans, Green, & Co., 1946.
- The navy of Britain: a historical portrait. London: George Allen and Unwin, 1948.
- Nelson's letters from the Leeward Islands and other original documents in the Public Record Office and the British Museum, edited by Geoffrey Rawson with annotation by Michael Lewis. London: Golden Cockerel Press, 1953. Limited edition of 300 copies.
- A narrative of my professional adventures (1790-1839), by Sir William Henry Dillon, edited by Michael Lewis. Two volumes. Greenwich: Navy Records Society, 1953–1956.
- The history of the British navy. Harmondsworth: Penguin, 1957.
- A Social History of the Navy, 1793-1815. London: George Allen & Unwin, 1960.
- The Spanish Armada. London: B. T. Batsford, 1960; Pan, 1966; Crowell, 1968.
- Armada guns, a comparative study of English and Spanish armaments. London, Allen & Unwin, 1961.
- Napoleon and his British captives. London: George Allen & Unwin, 1962.
- The Navy in transition, 1814-1864; a social history. London: Hodder and Stoughton, 1965.
- Ancestors; a personal exploration into the past. London, Hodder & Stoughton [1966].
- The Hawkins dynasty: three generations of a Tudor family. London, Allen & Unwin, 1969.
- Spithead; an informal history. London, Allen & Unwin, 1972.

=== Fiction ===
- Afloat & Ashore (verses). London: Allen & Unwin, 1921.
- Beg o' the Upland (novel). Oxford: Basil Blackwell, 1922.
- The Brand of the Beast. London: Allen & Unwin, 1924.
- Fleeting follies. (verse) London: Allen & Unwin, 1924.
- The Island of disaster (novel). London: Allen & Unwin, 1926.
- Roman Gold (novel). London: Allen & Unwin, 1927.
- The Three Amateurs (novel). LOndon: Houghton, 1929.
- The Crime of Herbert Wratislaus. London: Herbert Jenkins, 1931.

=== Other works ===
In addition, Lewis contributed the biography of Sir Geoffrey Callender to the Dictionary of National Biography, and the article "Armed Forces and the Art of War, 1830-1870" in the New Cambridge Modern History. He also wrote for periodicals, including Punch (1918-1931), Mariner's Mirror, Seafarer, the U.S. Naval Institute Proceedings, The Times, The Listener, Overseas, and the New Statesman.
