= Jackson baronets of Eagle House (1913) =

Baronetcy in the Baronetage of the United Kingdom

Escutcheon of the Jackson baronets of Eagle House

The Jackson baronetcy, of Eagle House, Wimbledon in the County of Surrey, was created in the Baronetage of the United Kingdom on 10 February 1913 for the architect Thomas Graham Jackson.

== Jackson baronets, of Eagle House (1913) ==
- Sir Thomas Graham Jackson, 1st Baronet (1835–1924)
- Sir Hugh Nicholas Jackson, 2nd Baronet (1881–1979)
- Sir Nicholas Fane St George Jackson, 3rd Baronet (born 1934). The 3rd Baronet is known as a composer, organist and harpsichordist with the Concertante of London.

The heir apparent is the present holder's only son Thomas Graham St George Jackson (born 1980).

== Notes ==
Baronetage of the United Kingdom
New creation	Baronet (of Belmont Castle); 1913–1916	Extinct
Preceded by Caird baronets	Jackson baronets of Eagle House; 10 February 1913	Succeeded by Bagot baronets
