= David Bonner-Smith =

English historian (1890–1950)

David Bonner-Smith (19 May 1890 – 10 December 1950), historian of the Royal Navy, served as Admiralty Librarian from March 1932 until May 1950.

== Personal life ==
Bonner-Smith married Vlasta Eileen Done. At the time of his death, he resided at Uplands, Lyth Hill Road, Bayston Hill, near Shrewsbury in Shropshire.

== Professional career ==
Bonner-Smith entered civil service at the Admiralty on Trafalgar Day (21 October) 1909. After serving in the Admiralty's record office, he was appointed to the staff of the Admiralty Library in March 1911. During World War I, he held an honorary commission in the Royal Naval Volunteer Reserve. From 1923 to 1925, he served as the secretary to the Naval Attaché in South America. he was appointed deputy librarian in 1931 on the death of W.G. Perrin and the appointment of J. Falkner Phillips, M.B.E., as Admiralty Library. Bonner-Smith was appointed Phillips's successor in March 1932 and served until his retirement at the age of 60 in 1950. A frequent contributor to the Mariner's Mirror, he served as its editor from 1932 to 1939. The Society for Nautical Research elected him an Honorary Vice-President on his retirement.

His anonymous obituarist in The Mariner's Mirror wrote of him that "it has been said that Bonner-Smith not only knew every one of the 100,000 books in the library, but was also familiar with all their contents. It is a fact that he could immediately direct students and enquirers to whatever references were needed, and have the necessary books at once placed before them, Scores of our members must owe a great debt of gratitude to his ever-ready and encyclopaedic acquaintance with books and documents dealing with the sea and the services."

The Times reported that "It was a bitter disappointment to him that his scholarship and unique qualifications had received so little appreciation that, during the war, he was transferred to mere routine work of small importance while the library to which he devoted all his enthusiasm and the greater part of his official life was put into other hands; and later, that the official call for a volunteer to succeed him on his coming retirement should specify that no previous library experience was necessary."

== Publications ==
Bonner-Smith was a devoted member of the Navy Records Society and, at the time of his death, was reputed to have "edited more volumes than any other member; his scholarly were a model of what such contributions should be."

- Letters of Admiral of the fleet, the John Jervis, Earl of St. Vincent whilst the first lord of the Admiralty, 1801-1804, edited by David Bonner Smith. Publications of the Navy Records Society, vols. 55, 61 ([London]: Printed for the Navy Records Society, 1922–27).
- The Barrington papers: selected from the letters and papers of Admiral the Hon. Samuel Barrington, edited by D. Bonner-Smith. Publications of the Navy Records Society, vols. 77, 81. ([London]: Printed for the Navy Records Society, 1937–41).
- Recollections of my sea life from 1808 to 1830, by Captain John Harvey Boteler, R.N., edited by David Bonner-Smith. Publications of the Navy Records Society, v. 82 ([London]: Printed for the Navy Records Society, 1942).
- Russian war, 1854, Baltic and Black Sea: official correspondence, edited by edited by D. Bonner-Smith and Captain A.C. Dewar. Publications of the Navy Records Society. v. 83. ([London]: Printed for the Navy Records Society, 1943).
- Russian War, 1855, Baltic: official correspondence [of Sir Richard Saunders Dundas], edited by David Bonner-Smith. Publications of the Navy Records Society, vol. 84. ([London]: Printed for the Navy Records Society, 1944).
- The Second China War, 1856-1860, edited by D. Bonner-Smith and E. W. R. Lumby. Publications of the Navy Records Society, v. 95 ([London]: Printed for the Navy Records Society, 1952).
- The Commissioned Sea Officers of the Royal Navy, 1660-1815, three volumes (London: National Maritime Museum, ca. 1954).
