= Michael Duffy (historian) =

Naval historian

Michael Duffy (born 1944) is a British naval historian, specialising in the Napoleonic war period. He is reader in British history and director of the Centre for Maritime Historical Studies at the University of Exeter.

== Academic career ==
Duffy earned his BA in history, MA, and DPhil in history at the University of Oxford. Appointed to the faculty of the University of Exeter, he has been assistant lecturer, lecturer, senior lecturer, head of history and dean of arts. Appointed director of the Centre for Maritime Historical Studies in 1991, he was promoted to reader in British history in 2001.

He has been vice-president of the Navy Records Society and editor of the Mariner's Mirror.

== Published books ==
- The military revolution and the state, 1500-1800, edited by Michael Duffy (1980)
- Soldiers, sugar and seapower: the British expeditions to the West Indies and the war against revolutionary France (1987)
- Parameters of British naval power 1650-1850(1992)
- The new maritime history of Devon, edited by Michael Duffy, et al. (1992, 1994)
- Profiles in Power: The Younger Pitt (2000)
- The Glorious First of June: A naval battle and its aftermath, edited by Roger Morriss and Michael Duffy (2003)
- The Naval Miscellany, Vol. 6, Navy Records Society, 2003.
- Touch and take: The Battle of Trafalgar 21 October 1805 (2005)
