= Bagot baronets of Levens Hall (1913) =

Extinct baronetcy

Escutcheon of the Bagot baronets of Levens Hall

The Bagot baronetcy of Levens Hall in Westmorland was created in the Baronetage of the United Kingdom on 19 April 1913, for Alan Desmond Bagot of the Royal Horse Guards. His father Josceline Bagot had been nominated that year for a baronetcy, but died on 1 March 1913.

== Bagot baronets of Levens Hall, Westmorland (1913)) ==
- Sir Alan Desmond Bagot, 1st Baronet (20 February 1896 – 11 January 1920). The title became extinct on his death in 1920, leaving no heir.

Baronetage of the United Kingdom
Preceded by Jackson baronets	Bagot baronets of Levens Hall; 19 April 1913	Succeeded by Barrie baronets
