= Nicholas Jackson (composer) =

English composer and organist (b. 1934)

Sir Nicholas Fane St George Jackson (b. 4 September 1934), 3rd Baronet, LRAM, ARCM, is a composer, organist and harpsichordist, director of the Concertante of London since 1987, and one of the Jackson baronets of Eagle House.

== Life and career ==
The son of Sir Hugh Jackson, 2nd Baronet and the grandson of architect Sir Thomas Graham Jackson, Nicholas Jackson was educated at Radley College, was Organ Scholar at Wadham College, Oxford, and studied organ and harpsichord at the Royal Academy of Music with Caleb Henry Trevor, George Malcolm, and Gustav Leonhardt. He also studied composition with Edmund Rubbra at Wadham and John Gardner at RAM.

Jackson made his professional début as an orchestral soloist in 1964 at the Wigmore Hall, performing harpsichord concertos with the newly formed chamber orchestra Concertante of London, and his first published composition, Mass for a Saint’s Day, was composed in 1966. He was organist at several London churches in the 1960s and 1970s, including at St James’s Piccadilly and St Lawrence Jewry-next-Guildhall. He married Nadia Michard in 1972 and a son, Thomas Graham St George Jackson, was born in 1980. In 1977 Jackson was appointed as organist and Master of the Choristers at St Davids Cathedral in Pembrokeshire, Wales, where he remained until 1984.

Jackson was Examiner, Trinity College of Music from 1985 until 1999. In 1987 he became Director of the Bach Festival at the Santes Creus monastery in Spain, where he re-formed the Concertante of London. The Concertante has performed Jackson's reconstructions and arrangements, including William Lawes’ masque The Triumph of Peace and his realisation of Bach’s Musical Offering for four players, which has been recorded.

== Organist ==
- St Anne’s, Soho, 1963–68
- St James’s, Piccadilly, 1971–74
- St Lawrence, Jewry, 1974–77
- St Davids Cathedral, 1977–84

== Music ==
As a composer his music has been described as modern-romantic, influenced by French composers such as Marcel Dupré, Durufle, Langlais, Olivier Messiaen and Tournemire. His Mass for a Saint's Day, originally published by Boosey & Hawkes, was recorded by the Choir of Winchester Cathedral for Decca in 1972, and has remained popular. His first opera, The Reluctant Highwayman, was produced at the Broomhill Summer Festival near Tunbridge Wells in 1995, directed by Simon Callow. The Requiem, completed in 2006, is an enlargement of the earlier Missa cum Jubilo. His second opera, The Rose and the Ring, is based on the novel by Thackeray and draws on harpsichord sonatas by Domenico Scarlatti for the music. It was premiered in London, at Drapers' Hall on 4 May 2016 and then at The Charterhouse on 5 May 2016. There are two CDs of his organ and choral music issued by Naxos.

=== Works ===
- Mass for a Saint’s Day, choral (1966)
- 20th Century Merbecke, after John Merbecke (1967)
- Concert Variations on 'Praise to the Lord, the Almighty' for organ (1971)
- Four Images for organ (1971)
- Magnificat and Nunc Dimittis (1975)
- Magnificat and Nunc Dimittis in the Lydian Mode (1975)
- Behold a Great Priest, choral (1980)
- I will give thanks, choral (1981)
- Divertissement for organ (1983)
- Salve Regina, choral (1983)
- Organ Mass (1984)
- Te Deum and Jubilate (1984)
- Two Organ Sonatas (1985)
- Organ Sonata (1986)
- Suite, for brass quintet and organ (1986)
- Organ Sonata (1995)
- The Reluctant Highwayman, opera (1992, première, 1995)
- (completed) Bach’s Fugue BWV 906 (1996)
- Missa Cum Jubilo, choral (1998)
- Tantum ergo, choral (2005)
- Requiem, choral (1976-2006)
- Venetian Serenade, wind ensemble (2008)
- The Four Temperaments, piano concertino (2009)
- Six Elizabethan Songs (2010)
- Piano Trio (2011)
- The Rose and the Ring, opera (2016)
- Le Petit Prince, opera, (2020, premiere Drapers' Hall)
