= Sir James Caird, 1st Baronet, of Belmont Castle =

Scottish businessman & mathematician (1837–1916)

Sir James Key Caird
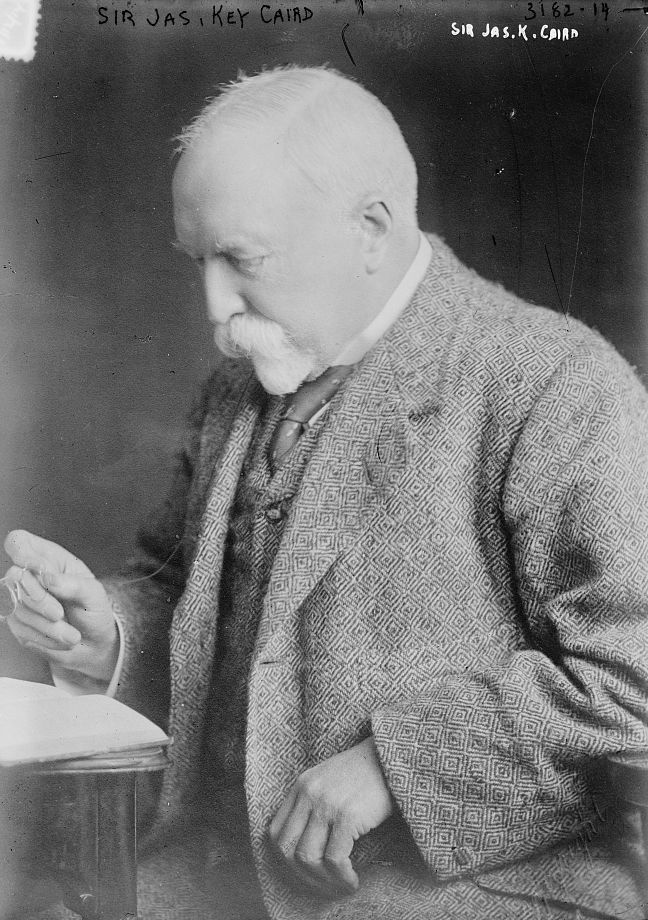
- Sir James Key Caird
- Born: January 1837
- Died: March 1916 (aged 79)
- Occupation: Mathematician

Sir James Key Caird, 1st Baronet (7 January 1837 – 9 March 1916) was a Scottish jute baron and mathematician. He was one of Dundee's most successful entrepreneurs, who used the latest technology in his Ashton and Craigie Mills.

Caird was noted for his interest in providing financial aid for scientific research. He was one of the sponsors of Sir Ernest Shackleton's ill-fated Antarctic expedition of 1914 to 1916. The ship's boat, the James Caird, in which six of Shackleton's expedition made an epic voyage of 700 nautical miles (1,300 km) from Elephant Island to South Georgia, was named in appreciation of Caird's contribution.

== Biography ==
James Caird was born in Dundee, and was the son of Edward Caird (1806–1889) who had founded the firm of Caird (Dundee) Ltd in 1832. The business was originally based in a 12 loom shed at Ashtown Works. The elder Caird was one of the first textile manufacturers to weave cloth composed of jute warp and weft. As the use of jute became increasingly popular, the Caird business expanded and thrived.

=== Business career ===
In 1870 James Caird succeeded his father as head of Caird (Dundee) Ltd. Under his leadership Ashton Works was re-built, expanded and equipped with the latest machinery. In 1905, the firm also took over Craigie Works, which had formerly supplied Caird with much of his yarn. Eventually the two works employed 2,000 hands. The Dundee Advertiser reported that Caird was a good employer who ran an efficient business which was also "a model of comfort for the workers".

=== Family ===
In 1873, Caird married Sophy Gray (1843–82), sister-in-law of the painter John Everett Millais. Her mental health was poor and Caird appears to have been rather neglectful towards her. They had one daughter, Beatrix Ada (1874–1888). His wife died at the age of 38 in 1882, possibly as a result of her longstanding battle with anorexia. The couple's daughter died in 1888 at the age of 14. After the death of his closest family, Caird increasingly devoted himself to philanthropic causes.

=== Philanthropy and research funding ===
James Caird made a substantial fortune from his business interests and reinvested much of it in his home city. He gave both the Caird Hall, which dominates City Square, and Caird Park in the north of city to the people of Dundee which also includes Mains Castle also known as Fintry Castle. The Marryat Hall, given by his sister Mrs Emma Grace Marryat, links to Caird Hall. In total, between 1895 and 1914 James Caird gave £240,940 in donations to various good causes institutions and organisations in Dundee and elsewhere. In 1902 Caird offered £18,500 to the directors of the Dundee Royal Infirmary so they could erect a hospital for the treatment of cancer. He also provided £1,000 a year for five years to fund research "into the nature of this mysterious disease." The resulting facility opened in 1906 and admitted its first patients in January 1907. His father had earlier left a legacy to Dundee Royal Infirmary, among other good causes.

Escutcheon of the Caird baronets of Belmont Castle

Caird was created a baronet on 8 February 1913.

Caird was noted for his interest in providing financial aid for scientific research. In 1913, he presented the Royal Society with a cheque for £5,000, which was to be used to fund physical research. Caird also offered University College, Dundee expansive plans for a Physics laboratory, but this offer was rejected by the College Council in 1905.

Caird helped to fund Sir Ernest Shackleton's Antarctic expedition of 1914 to 1916 on Endurance. The largest of the ship's boats, the James Caird, in which six of Endurance's crew made their epic small-boat voyage of 700 nautical miles (1,300 km; 810 mi) from Elephant Island to South Georgia, was named in appreciation of Caird's contribution. Caird himself died two months prior to Shackleton's arrival at Stromness, South Georgia. Thus, Caird died without ever learning of the successful rescue of Endurance's personnel whom he helped financing.

Caird was awarded the honorary degree Doctor of Laws (LL.D.) from the University of St. Andrews in March 1903.

=== Death ===
Caird died at his Perthshire estate, Belmont Castle near Meigle, which he had purchased after the death of its previous owner Sir Henry Campbell-Bannerman. The baronetcy became extinct upon his death. He is buried with his father in Dean Cemetery in Edinburgh just west of the central roundel, under a modest stone..

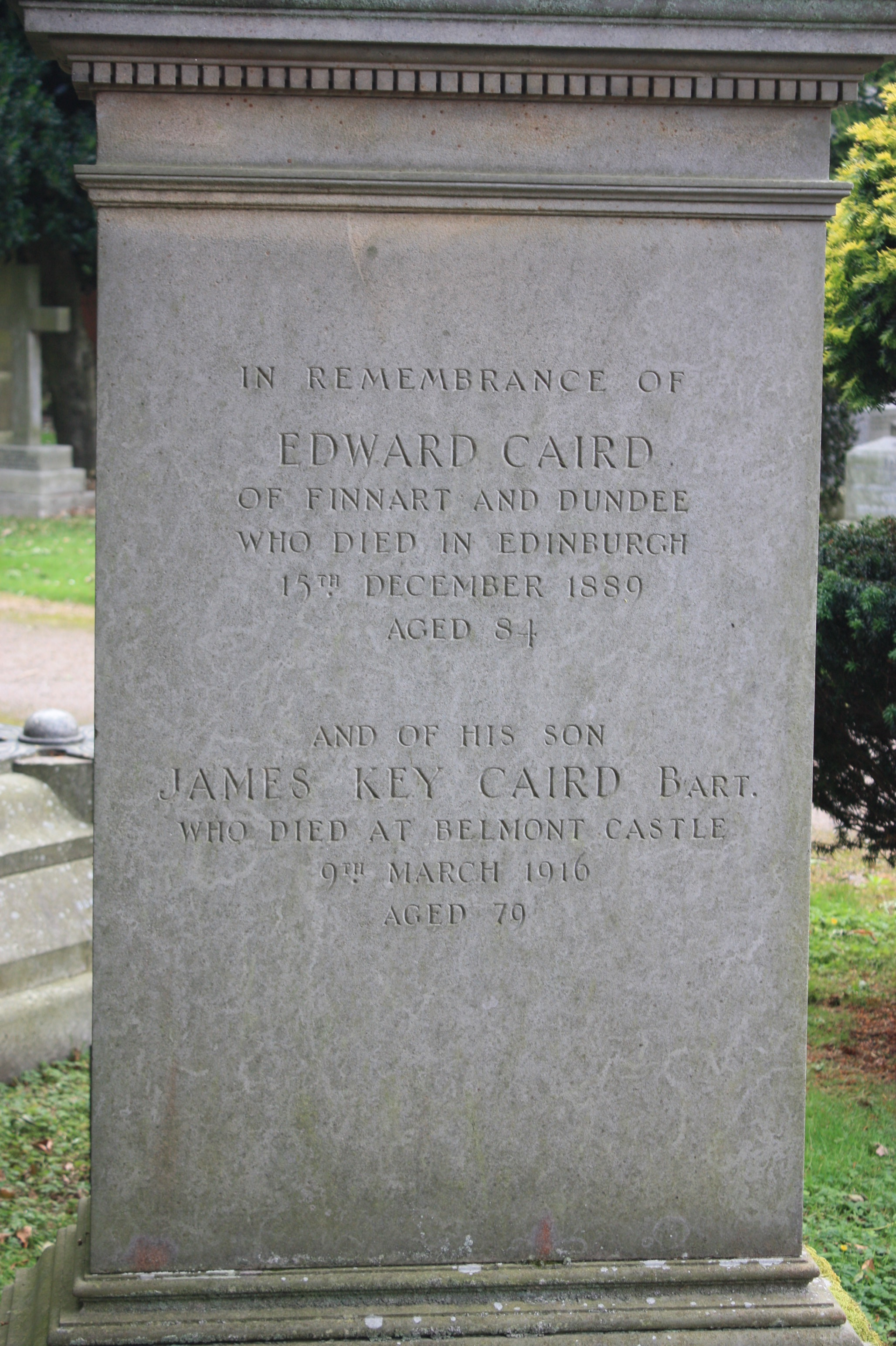
The Caird grave, Dean Cemetery

Baronetage of the United Kingdom
New creation	Baronet (of Belmont Castle); 1913–1916	Extinct
Preceded by Bartlett baronets	Caird baronets of Belmont Castle; 8 February 1913	Succeeded by Jackson baronets
