= William Gordon Perrin =

British writer (1874–1931)

Lieutenant Colonel William Gordon Perrin, OBE (1874–1931) was an RAF and Navy officer, and the Admiralty librarian from 1908 to 1931. He is most well known for his works on flags; particularly British Flags: Their Early History, and Their Development at Sea which has been described as the standard by which all other flag books are compared and Nelson's Signals in which he established that the flags which had been accepted as denoting Nelson's historic signal at Trafalgar were incorrect.

== Early life ==
Perrin was born on 10 February 1874. At a very early age he lost his father, and his education was thereby curtailed, but what he lacked in scholastic knowledge was more than compensated for in the school of experience and hard work. He entered the Civil Service by examination, and after a brief period in more than one department was posted to the Admiralty on 2 August 1893. He served first in the Record Office, where he acquired an aptitude for original research; and later in the Legal Branch, where he developed an interest in flag questions, upon which he became a recognised authority, and wrote a standard work.

== Military service ==
In December, 1900, he became private secretary to Sir Evan MacGregor, Secretary to the Admiralty, and subsequently to his successor, Sir Inigo Thomas. His services were utilised to a great extent by Lord Fisher in connection with the carrying out of his reforms in naval administration. There is a glowing tribute to Perrin's incomparable efficiency in one of Lord Fisher's books.

He was appointed Librarian at the Admiralty on 10 April 1908. The completion of the Admiralty Arch over the Mall afforded accommodation, long desired, for the reorganisation of the Library, and for this arduous work Perrin was just the man. He gathered, from attics and disused rooms, many volumes lying idle and uncared for and gave them proper house room, and took in hand the task of compiling a catalogue. In a little over two years the progress made was eulogised in a special article in The Times on 16 September 1910, which referred to the transfer of some 50,000 volumes to their new, spacious, and well-lighted apartments as having removed a long-standing reproach. A year later, on 20 September 1911, the new reading room attached to the library was formally opened by Reginald McKenna, then First Lord. Inigo Thomas, in his speech on that occasion, bore testimony to the energy and perseverance exhibited by Perrin.

Upon his death the First Lord of the Admiralty referred to

the great loss we have suffered in the premature death of the late Librarian, Mr WG Perrin., Mr Perrin has a distinguished career, as is evidenced by his connection with the Navy Records Society, the Society for Nautical Research and the National Maritime Museum. Mr Perrin retained the respect of all with whom he came into contact, and his place is difficult to fill.

== Other work and legacy ==
From 1922 until his death Perrin was honorary editor of the Mariner's Mirror and honorary secretary of both the Navy Records Society (since 1912: it owes to him its revival after the War) and, by appointment of the Admiralty, to the Trustees of the National Maritime Museum and MacPherson Collection at Greenwich.

In the course of his research work Perrin made himself proficient in foreign languages, and he became an expert palaeographer. He was a keen chess player and an amateur organist. He left a widow, but no family.

Since 2006 the Flag Institute has sponsored an annual public lecture on a flag-related topic, known as the 'Perrin Lecture' in honour of W.G. Perrin.
