= William Mansfield Poole =

William Poole
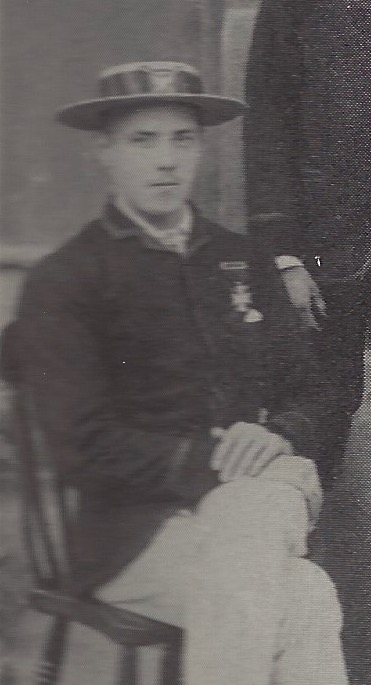

Personal information
- Born: 6 April 1871 Clifton, Bristol
- Died: 13 December 1946 (aged 75) Rye, East Sussex
- Relative: Gerald Robert Poole (Brother)

Sport
- Sport: Rowing
- Club: Oxford University Boat Club

William Mansfield Poole (6 April 1871 – 13 December 1946) was an educationalist and author of several widely held academic text books. He had a particular gift for languages and was an early head of Modern Languages at the Royal Naval College, Osborne. In his youth he was also an accomplished oarsman, and rowed for Oxford in the 1891 Boat Race.

== Life ==
Poole was born on 6 April 1871 in Clifton, then in the county of Gloucestershire. He was the son of Canon Robert Burton Poole, who was then a master at Clifton College and would later be headmaster of Bedford Modern School between 1877 and 1900.

Poole was educated at Bedford Modern School, where he was in the First IV from 1887 to 1889; the first XV from 1886 to 1888; captain of the team in 1887 and 1888. During his time in the IV the school three times won the Public School Challenge Cup at Marlow Regatta and the Public School Cup twice at Barnes and Mortlake Regatta. In 1889 he stroked the first coxswainless Public School IV to row at Henley. Going up to Magdalen College, Oxford, he rowed in the 1891 Boat Race.

After Oxford, Poole joined the staff of Merchant Taylors School. He went abroad to increase his knowledge of French and German before being appointed Modern Language Master to the Black Prince, a training ship for naval cadets. He went with them when they were removed to the Royal Naval College, Osborne, where he became head of modern languages. After Osborne he became senior modern language master at the Royal Naval College, Dartmouth. During his career he was the author of several text books. On retirement, Poole and his wife started a school in Brussels for English girls coming there to perfect their colloquial French. After about ten years he returned to England and settled in Beckley.

In 1908, Poole married the Hon. Millicent Chance Foster, daughter of Walter Foster, 1st Baron Ilkeston. They had one son and two daughters. Poole died in the District Memorial Hospital in Rye on 13 December 1946. His estate was left to his son, Major Evered Mansfield Poole.

== Selected works ==
- Poucinet; es- tu content? ou L'histoire des nez; and Les douze mois, by William Mansfield Poole and Édouard René Lefebvre Laboulaye. Published 1901
- French Commercial Correspondence. Published by John Murray, 1902
- French & German Picture Vocabulary, by W.Mansfield Poole, M.A. London. Published by John Murray, 1904
- Lectures Françaises. Géographie Et Histoire, by William Mansfield Poole and Michel Becker, Published London 1905
- Commercial French, New York: E.P. Dutton & Company Limited, 1916 by William Mansfield Poole
- Textes et questions: Classes élémentaires, by William Mansfield Poole and E. L. Lassimonne. Published by John Murray, 1918
- Conversations en classe, by William Mansfield Poole. Published by John Murray, 1926
- Grammaire française élémentaire avec exercices, by William Mansfield Poole. Published by John Murray, 1937
