= Royal Naval College, Osborne =

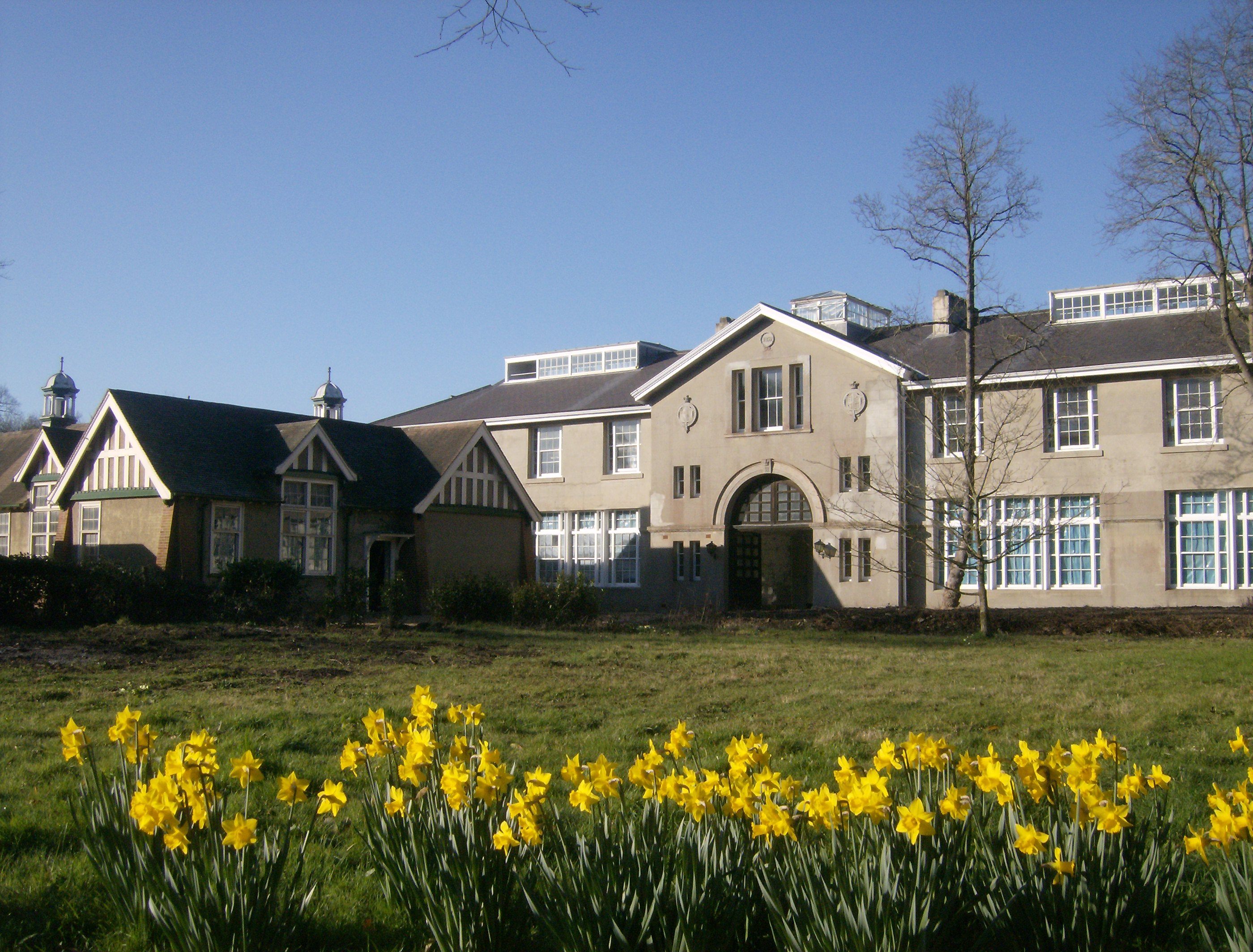
- The Stable Block at Osborne House, main building of the former College
- Active: 1903 – 1921
- Country: United Kingdom of Great Britain and Ireland
- Branch: Royal Navy
- Type: Training
- Role: Junior cadet training
- Garrison/HQ: Isle of Wight, England

The Royal Naval College, Osborne, was a training college for Royal Navy officer cadets on the Osborne House estate, Isle of Wight, established in 1903 and closed in 1921.

Boys were admitted at about the age of thirteen to follow a course lasting for six academic terms before proceeding to the Royal Naval College, Dartmouth.

Some formal appointments to the college were to HMS Racer, a vessel attached to the college, previously the tender to HMS Britannia.

== Background ==
Following the death of Queen Victoria in 1901, Osborne House, overlooking the River Medina, where she had spent her final years, was surplus to the requirements of the new king, her son Edward VII. He passed the property over to the government, apart from a few rooms in the main house which he kept as a private royal museum of the later life of Queen Victoria. In 1903, part of the estate, including the Osborne Stable Block, was converted into a naval training college, while the main house became a military hospital.

== Foundation ==
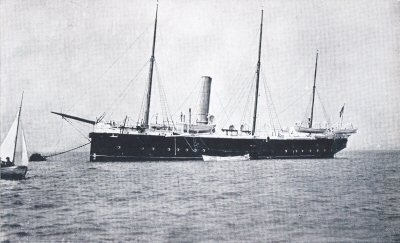
HMS Racer (1884), the college tender

Acting upon the Selborne-Fisher scheme (or New Scheme) for officer education, the Admiralty decided that the first two years, or six terms, of officer training should take place somewhere other than the Royal Naval College, Dartmouth. The Civil Lord of the Admiralty, Ernest Pretyman, asked the House of Commons for an increase of £400,000 in Vote 10 of the Navy Estimates for 1903–1904. He said that King Edward had indicated that he wished to present Osborne House and its grounds to the nation, thus providing "a most admirable site, in a situation second to none" for a naval establishment.

Pretyman went on to explain that several new buildings were needed, and he hoped they would be ready by August. There would be a large gymnasium and recreation hall, plus single-storey class-rooms and bungalow dormitories built of Euralite, with concrete floors, heated by steam from a boiler house. Each bungalow would have accommodation for about thirty cadets, and the Admiralty's present plans were for a total of about two hundred cadets. Land had been bought at Deal for a rifle range.

During the first half of 1903, Admiral Fisher chaired an education committee which had the task of establishing the college, to be controlled by the Admiralty. The college was formally opened on 4 August 1903 by the King and the first entry of 75 cadets, which included the future Admiral Sir Louis Hamilton and Admiral Sir Harold Walker joined on 15 September.

Two appointments were made long before the new college opened its doors. Captain Rosslyn E. Wemyss was appointed Captain of HMS Racer and Commandant of the Royal Naval College, Osborne, under the New Scheme, on 25 November 1902, and with effect from 12 March 1903 Commander William G. E. Ruck-Keene was appointed as Executive Officer of HMS Racer.

== The college ==
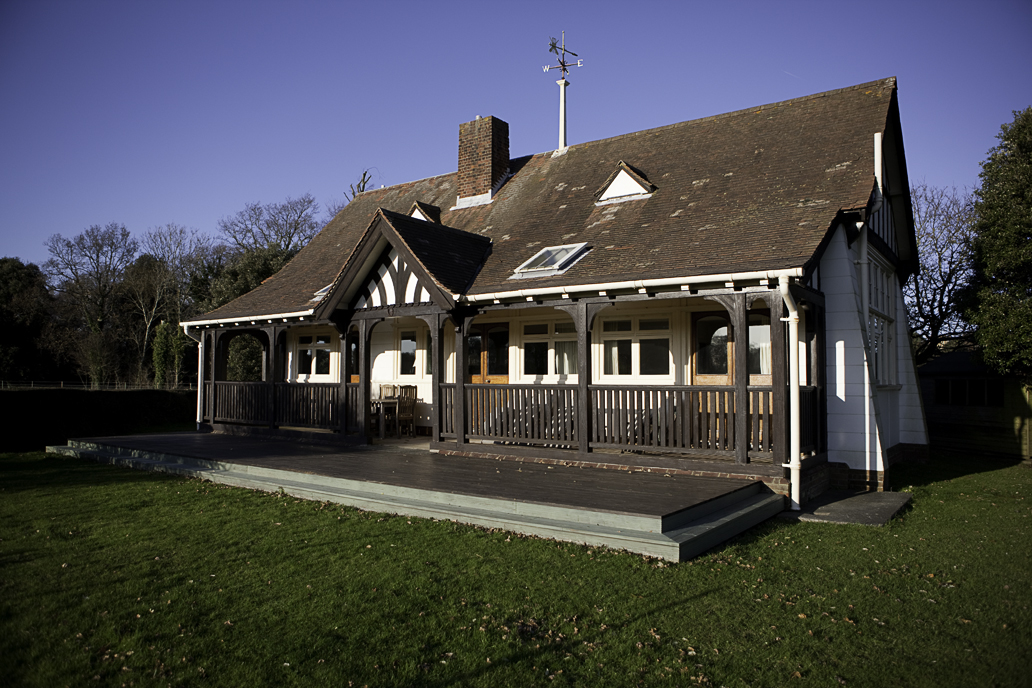
The college's cricket pavilion

Before admission as naval cadets at about the age of thirteen, boys had to pass an entrance examination, in which they were tested in English, history and geography (with special reference to the British Empire), arithmetic, algebra, geometry (practical and theoretical); French or German, with written and oral examinations; and Latin, with set translations and simple grammatical questions. A boy who passed the entrance examination was then appointed as a cadet, the appointment reading "To HMS Racer for the Royal Naval College, Osborne."

Boys at the college wore naval uniform and generally stayed for two years of initial training, divided into six terms, then from about the age of fifteen they continued their studies at the Royal Naval College, Dartmouth. HMS Racer, a ship dating from 1884, was given to the college at Osborne as a tender. All cadets were educated in mathematics, foreign languages, natural sciences, sailing, navigation, seamanship, and naval history, the science and technology to give non-engineering officers a better understanding of their future ships, while those who became engineers would be better equipped for command. Physical education and the usual school sports were also part of the curriculum, both for the benefit of the cadets and so that they could train their future ships' crews and produce sports teams to play friendly matches while on good-will visits in overseas ports. At the end of their four years at Osborne and Dartmouth, cadets were posted to training ships, to gain practical experience at sea, before being posted into real-life naval service, as newly commissioned officers. A final examination after four years decided the seniority and postings of the new junior officers and also had a big impact on their chances of early promotion.

The college was funded very like other boarding schools, charging fees of £75 a year for each boy, not including clothes and travelling expenses, but with no compulsory extras; so the cost of educating a boy at Osborne was rather less than at a traditional public school. Fathers who were Army and Navy officers or civilian officers working for the Board of Admiralty could plead straitened circumstances, in which event the fees could be reduced to £40 a year, if the merits of the case were accepted.

The college closed in 1921, with the last students leaving on 9 April 1921, after the Admiralty had taken the decision to bring the whole of the four-year course to Dartmouth. Almost all Osborne boys progressed to Dartmouth at the beginning of the following term.

Osborne inspired the Merchant Navy's Nautical College, Pangbourne, founded in 1917, where boys continued to wear naval uniform and to maintain some other traditions.

== Captains and Commandants of the College ==
The following served as captain and Commandant of the college:

Order	Officeholder	Title	Term began	Term end	Time in office	Notes
1	Captain Rosslyn Erskine Wemyss	Captain of HMS Racer and Commandant of the Royal Naval College, Osborne	1 August 1903	1 September 1905	2 years, 31 days	
2	Captain Edwyn Alexander-Sinclair	Captain of HMS Racer and Commandant of the Royal Naval College, Osborne	1 May 1905			
3	Captain Richard Stapleton-Cotton	Captain of HMS Racer and Commandant of the Royal Naval College, Osborne	1906			
4	Captain Arthur Henry Christian	Captain of HMS Racer and Commandant of the Royal Naval College, Osborne	16 July 1908	5 October 1910	2 years, 81 days	
5	Captain the Hon. Horace Lambert Alexander Hood	Captain of HMS Racer and Commandant of the Royal Naval College, Osborne	5 October 1910	16 January 1913	2 years, 103 days	
6	Captain Rudolph Walter Bentinck	Captain of HMS Racer and Commandant of the Royal Naval College, Osborne	16 January 1913	31 July 1914	1 year, 196 days	
7	Captain Herbert Edward Holmes à Court	Captain of HMS Racer and Commandant of the Royal Naval College, Osborne	1 August 1914			
8	Captain Henry FitzRoy George Talbot	Captain of HMS Racer and Commandant of the Royal Naval College, Osborne	15 December 1918	5 May 1920	1 year, 142 days	
9	Captain Francis Arthur Marten	Captain of HMS Racer and Commandant of the Royal Naval College, Osborne	5 May 1920	1 February 1921	272 days	
10	Captain Charles William Rawson Royds	Captain of HMS Racer and Commandant of the Royal Naval College, Osborne	2 February 1921	3 May 1921	90 days	
11	Commander Charles Frederic Roy Cowan (acting Captain)	Captain of HMS Racer and Commandant of the Royal Naval College, Osborne	3 May 1921	20 May 1921	18 days	

== Notable teaching staff ==
See also Category:Instructors of the Royal Naval College, Osborne

In 1907 George Dyson was appointed as the college's director of music, on the recommendation of Sir Hubert Parry. He moved on to Marlborough College in 1911 and was succeeded by Reginald Thatcher. Paul Boissier was another member of the staff and went on to become the headmaster of Harrow School. R. P. Keigwin, a first-class cricketer and languages master, moved on to teach at Clifton College in 1919.

The schoolmasters who in 1921 were left without teaching posts when the college closed were offered employment at the Royal Naval College, Greenwich. In this way, Charles Godfrey became the head of Mathematics at Greenwich, with the title of Professor, having been headmaster at Osborne, while Michael Lewis and Geoffrey Callender, two other masters from Osborne, also became heads of departments at Greenwich. William Mansfield Poole, the head of modern languages at Osborne, proceeded with his boys to the Royal Naval College, Dartmouth, and continued to teach there.

== Notable alumni ==
See also Category:People educated at the Royal Naval College, Osborne

- William Agnew (1898–1960), later Vice-Admiral Sir William Gladstone Agnew KCVO CB DSO
- William Andrewes (1899–1974), later Admiral Sir William Gerrard Andrewes KBE CB DSO
- Edmund Anstice (1899–1979), later Vice Admiral Sir Edmund Anstice KCB
- George Archer-Shee (1895–1914) was expelled from Osborne in 1908 after being falsely accused of stealing a postal order, inspiring the play The Winslow Boy. He was killed in action in 1914.
- Harold Harington Balfour (1897–1988), later a First World War flying ace and Conservative politician, became Lord Balfour of Inchrye MC & Bar, PC
- Claud Barry (1891—1951), later Admiral Sir Claud Barrington Barry KBE CB DSO
- Prince Louis of Battenberg (1900–1979), later Admiral of the Fleet Louis Mountbatten, 1st Earl Mountbatten of Burma KG, GCB, OM, GCSI, GCIE, GCVO, DSO, PC, FRS
- Walter Napier Thomason Beckett (1893–1941), later Captain Beckett MVO DSC
- Patrick Blackett (1897–1974), later Patrick, Lord Blackett OM CH PRS, experimental physicist
- Sidney Boucher (1899–1963), later Captain Sidney Boucher CBE
- Robin Bridge (1894–1971), later Admiral Sir Robin Bridge KBE CB
- Benjamin Bryant (1905–1994), later Rear Admiral Benjamin Bryant CB DSO DSC
- Anthony Buzzard (1902–1972), later Rear-Admiral Sir Anthony Buzzard CB, DSO, OBE
- Kendal Chavasse (1904−2001), later Colonel Kendal Chavasse DSO and bar
- Laurence Durlacher (1904−1986), later Admiral Sir Laurence Durlacher, KCB, OBE, DSC
- Richard Coleridge (1905–1984), later Richard Coleridge, 4th Baron Coleridge KBE DL RN, Executive Secretary of NATO 1952–1970
- Walter Couchman (1905–1981), later Admiral Sir Walter Thomas Couchman KCB CVO DSO OBE
- Victor Crutchley (1893–1986), later Admiral Sir Victor Crutchley VC, KCB, DSC
- Henry Carlton Cumberbatch (1900–1966), later Commander RN and submariner
- Henry St John Fancourt (1900–2004), a pioneering naval aviator
- John Paul Wellington Furse (1904 –1978), later Rear Admiral GCB OBE VMH
- Thomas Dunlop Galbraith (1891–1985), later Thomas Galbraith, 1st Baron Strathclyde
- Michael Cavenagh Gillett (1907–1971), British diplomat, who retired as British Ambassador to Afghanistan.
- Rupert Gould (1890–1948)
- Deric Holland-Martin (1906–1977), later Admiral Sir Douglas Eric Holland-Martin GCB DSO DSC DL
- Charles Lambe (1900–1960), later Admiral of the Fleet Sir Charles Lambe GCB CVO
- Jack Llewelyn Davies (1894–1959) was one of the five Llewelyn Davies boys who inspired J. M. Barrie's Peter Pan. Davies, whose brothers all went to Eton, later described his two years at Osborne as horrendous.
- John Cecil Masterman (1891–1977), later cricketer, spymaster, and vice-chancellor
- Lewis Nixon (naval architect) (1861–1940), a naval architect and grandfather of Lewis Nixon III
- Richard Onslow (1903–1975), later Admiral Sir Richard George Onslow KCB, DSO & 3 Bars
- Wilfrid Denys Pawson (1905–1959), later Archdeacon of Lindisfarne
- Conway Pulford (1892–1942), later Air Vice Marshal Conway Pulford CB, OBE, AFC
- Christopher Roper-Curzon (1896–1972), later Baron Teynham
- Robert St Vincent Sherbrooke (1901–1972), later Rear Admiral Sherbrooke VC, CB, DSO
- Conolly Abel Smith (1899–1985), later Vice-Admiral Sir Edward Conolly Abel Smith GCVO, CB, JP
- Anthony Thorold (1903–1999), later Captain Sir Anthony Thorold OBE, DSC & Bar
- Prince Albert Frederick of Wales (1895–1952), later Duke of York and King George VI
- Prince Edward of Wales (1894–1972), later King Edward VIII and Duke of Windsor
- Prince George of Wales (1902–1942), later George, Duke of Kent
- Frederic John Walker (1896–1944), later Captain Frederic John Walker CB, DSO & Three Bars
- Alan Webb, an actor

When the naval aviator Henry St John Fancourt died in 2004, at the age of 103, he was one of the last surviving Osborne boys and may also have been the last survivor of the Battle of Jutland.
