= Michael Oppenheim =

Michael Morris Oppenheim (26 June 1853, in Hoxton, London, England – 27 April 1927, in Rome, Italy) was the pioneer historian of English naval administration.

== Early life and education ==
In 1874, Oppenheim entered University College Hospital Medical School. After completing his medical training in 1878, he spent a year at Middlesex Hospital and then completed his examination as a member of the Royal College of Surgeons in 1879.

== Medical career ==
Going to sea as a ship's surgeon, Oppenheim first sailed with the Royal Mail Line. His name regularly appeared in medical directories as a surgeon with that shipping company until 1888, although he served on P&O's Assam in 1882–1883.

== Career as an independent historian ==
On inheriting some money, Oppenheim left the medical profession and became a self-supporting independent historical researcher. His first results were published in The English Historical Review in several articles that appeared in 1891–1894 and in 1896. These articles became the basis for his first major work, A History of the Administration of the Royal Navy ... to 1660 (1896).

While writing these first articles, Oppenheim became one of the founding members of the Navy Records Society in 1893. He edited two important volumes for the Society, The Naval Accounts of ... Henry VII and the Naval Tracts of Sir William Monson. After completing these volumes, he went on to edit and annotate a new edition of Sir Arthur Helps' Spanish Conquest of America, originally published in 1855–1861.

As a result of these achievements, H. Arthur Doubleday, invited Oppenheim to contribute chapters on maritime history to the Victoria County History of England, publishing chapters in Cornwall vol I (1906), Dorset vol. II, Essex vol.II (1907), Suffolk vol. II (1907), and Sussex vol. II (1907).

When a reviewer criticized his contribution to the Sussex volume, Oppenheim wanted to resign, but the new series editor, William Page, persuaded him to continue with contributions to Somerset vol. II (1911), and to Kent vol. II, which was eventually published in 1926. He wrote another for Devon, but this did not appear in the series and was not published until 1968.

Angered and embarrassed by criticism of his work, he cancelled his plan to write a second volume on naval administration up to 1714 and gave away his 10,000 volume personal library to the Public Library of Bath, Somerset in 1919. Writing nothing more, he spent the remainder of his life abroad and died in Rome, Italy.

== Published works ==
- A history of the administration of the Royal Navy and of merchant shipping in relation to the Navy from 1509 to 1660 with an introduction treating of the preceding period. London: John Lane. The Bodley Head, 1896; Aldershot: Temple Smith, 1988.
- Naval accounts and inventories of the reign of Henry VII, 1485–8 and 1495–7, edited by M. Oppenheim. Publications of the Navy Records Society, vol 8. [London]: Printed for the Navy Records Society, 1896.
- The Spanish conquest in America: and its relation to the history of slavery and to the government of colonies, by Sir Arthur Helps. A new edition, edited, with an introduction, maps, and notes by M. Oppenheim. Four volumes. London; New York: John Lane, 1900–04.
- The Naval tracts of Sir William Monson in six books, edited with a commentary drawn from the State papers and other original sources by M. Oppenheim. Publications of the Navy Records Society, vols. 22, 23, 43, 45, 47. [London]: Printed for the Navy Records Society, 1902–1914.
- The maritime history of Devon by M. M. Oppenheim; with an introduction by W. E. Minchinton. Exeter: University of Exeter, 1968.

== Sources ==
- Kenneth R. Andrews, "Introduction" to M. Oppenheim, A History of the Administration of the Royal Navy and of Merchant Shipping in Relation to the Navy from 1509 to 1660, with an introduction to the Preceding Period. London: Temple Smith, 1988.
- Walter E. Minchinton, "Introduction" to Oppenheim, The Maritime History of Devon. Exeter: University of Exeter Press, 1968.
- "Oppenheim. Michael Morris (1853–1927)" in International Encyclopedia of Naval Warfare ABC-Clio,
