= Geoffrey Callender =

English naval historian (1875–1946)

Callender in 1944.

Sir Geoffrey Arthur Romaine Callender (25 November 1875 – 6 November 1946) was an English naval historian and the first director of the National Maritime Museum from its opening in 1937 until his death in 1946.

== Life ==
The son of a cotton mill owner called Arthur William and his wife, a vicar's daughter Agnes Louisa, he was born in Didsbury, Manchester, and educated at St Edward's School, Oxford, before going on to study modern history at Merton College, where he graduated honours (second class) in 1897. He joined the Royal Naval College, Osborne, in 1905, shortly after its foundation, making up for the lack of a textbook by producing his own Sea Kings of Britain (3 vols., 1907–11) and being promoted to head of English and history in January 1913.

In 1920 he became the Society for Nautical Research's honorary secretary and treasurer, and remained so until his death. He then moved to head Dartmouth Royal Naval College's history department in 1921, but after only a year moved to be the first Professor of History at the Royal Naval College, Greenwich, during the addition of a staff college and a war college to the institution. This was part of a move to incorporate study of naval history into naval education, a need for which had been shown by the recent First World War, and it was in this job that Callender wrote The Naval Side of British History (1924) and headed up the SNR's successful campaigns to save HMS Victory for the nation and to found a naval and maritime museum for the United Kingdom. He retained the chair from 1922 to 1934, when he was succeeded by Michael Lewis.

In the campaign for a maritime museum, patrons such as Sir James Caird and SNR support enabled Callender to purchase the large Macpherson collection of naval and nautical prints in 1928 - this was then added to the Greenwich Naval College's collection of ship-models and marine art to form the nucleus of the new museum's collection. A building to house the collection was also soon found when the Queen's House at Greenwich was vacated by the Royal Hospital School, and so in 1934 the government passed the National Maritime Museum Act, making Callender the museum's first director. The Queen's House was restored, galleries prepared within it, and further objects collected and arranged, all with Callender's energetic participation, and opening came only 3 years after the Act, in 1937.

Callender never married. He was knighted in 1938, and up until his sudden death in 1946 (which occurred in the National Maritime Museum) continued to make acquisitions and improvements to the museum's collection. He was buried in Charlton Cemetery.

In his Dictionary of National Biography entry Michael Lewis wrote that Callender:

was a man of exceptional personality, a born conversationalist, and a brilliant lecturer, respected and beloved by several generations of naval officers, and possessed of an encyclopaedic knowledge of nautical antiquities.

== Works ==
- Sea Kings of Britain (3 vols., 1907–11)
- The Life of Nelson (1912)
- Spindrift: Salt from the Ocean of English Prose (1915)
- The Story of H.M.S. "Victory" (1915?)
- Realms of Melody (editor, 1916)
- Nelson's Flagship; abridged from the Story of H.M.S. "Victory" (1919)
- Southey's Life of Nelson (editor, 1922)
- The Naval Side of British History (1924)
- Catalogue of a Loan Exhibition of Paintings & Prints from the Macpherson Collection (The Guildhall Art Gallery, 1928)
- The Queen's House Greenwich. A Short History, 1617-1937 (1937)
