= Sir James Caird, 1st Baronet, of Glenfarquhar =

British businessman (1864-1954)

- Sir James Caird, 1st Bt
- Born: 2 January 1864; Glasgow
- Died: 27 September 1954 (aged 90)
- Education: The Glasgow Academy
- Known for: Founding the National Maritime Museum
- Spouse: Henrietta Anna Stephens (m. 1898)
- Children: 1

Sir James Caird, 1st Baronet (2 January 1864 – 27 September 1954) was a shipowner and the principal donor in creating the National Maritime Museum, London.

== Early life and education ==
The eldest son of James Caird, a lawyer, and his wife, Mary Ann née Hutcheson, James Caird was born in Glasgow, Scotland, educated at Glasgow Academy, and then in 1878 joined a leading firm of East India merchants, William Graham & Co., headquartered in Glasgow. Caird married Henrietta Anna Stephens on 4 July 1894, with whom he had one daughter.

== Business career ==
In 1889, he went to London, where he soon joined Turnbull, Martin & Co., formed in Glasgow in 1874, and managed by the Scottish Shire Line. He quickly became the manager and, by 1903, was the sole partner and owner of the Scottish Shire Line. His company developed a cooperative enterprise with Houlder and Federal Lines to open trade with Australia and New Zealand. In 1916, he started a shipyard at Chepstow, a place located away from enemy attack, in order to quickly build a standardised design of ships that could replace wartime ship losses. A year later in 1917, his success led to a government buy-out. Looking ahead, Caird foresaw that the shipping industry would decline in the postwar era, so he sold many of his shipping interests but remained a director in some 25 companies associated with shipping, shipbuilding, and maritime trade. He remained chairman of the Smithfield and Argentine Meat Company and continued to hold his significant number of founders' shares. Caird died in Wimbledon, Surrey, England.

== Interest in maritime history and heritage ==
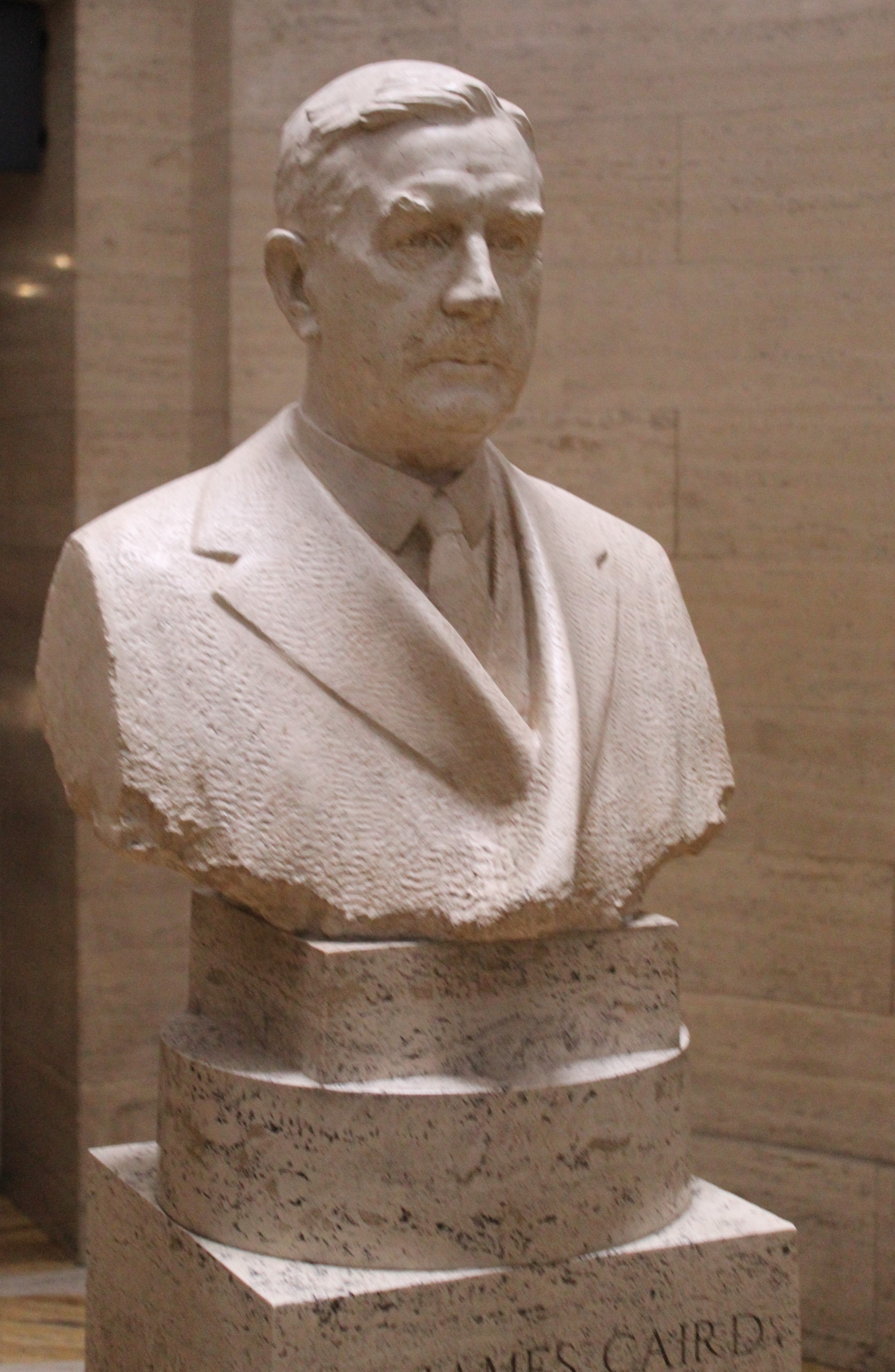
Sir James Caird by William Reid Dick, 1937, National Maritime Museum, London

Having accumulated a significant fortune, Caird became interested in preserving British naval and shipping memorials. As a member of the Society for Nautical Research, he provided the largest amount of money necessary to repair and restore HMS Victory in the 1920s, giving an initial £50,000 with an additional donation of £15,000. He also was responsible for trying to save HMS Implacable (originally the French Navy's Téméraire-class ship of the line Duguay-Trouin, launched in 1800), another survivor of the Battle of Trafalgar.

In 1927, when the initial interest emerged to establish a national museum for preserving and displaying Britain's maritime history, Caird joined a board of trustees that had been established through the Society for Nautical Research to work toward founding the new museum. An opportunity arose to do this when the Royal Hospital School moved from Greenwich to Holbrook, Suffolk in 1933. With the school's Greenwich buildings vacated, Caird offered to fund the entire cost of renovating them to serve as a museum. This cost eventually reached £80,000. At the same time, Caird began purchasing a wide range of historical artefacts, rare books, globes, nautical instruments, artwork, and shipmodels that were reported in 1934 to be worth in excess of £300,000.

Parliament passed the National Maritime Museum Act in 1934 and King George VI opened the museum in April 1937, under the directorship of Sir Geoffrey Callender. Even after the opening of the museum, Caird continued to donate and support its work.

== Honours and awards ==
In 1928, Caird was created a baronet, taking the title from his home in Scotland, Glenfarquhar, at Fourdoun, Aberdeenshire. In 1937, he was offered a peerage, but refused. On his death in 1954, the baronetcy became extinct.

Caird is warmly remembered at the National Maritime Museum, where his name graces the Caird Library, the Caird Entrance, the Caird fellowships funded by the Caird Fund, and the Caird Medal, awarded to distinguished contributions to the fields of the museum's interests.

== Sources ==
- James Caird, "A museum in the making", Syren and Shipping (2 January 1935).
- F.G.G. Carr, rev Ann Savours, "Caird, Sir James, of Glenfarquhar", Oxford Dictionary of National Biography (2004).
- Kevin Littlewood, Of Ships and Stars: Maritime Heritage and the Founding of the National Maritime Museum, Greenwich (1998).

Baronetage of the United Kingdom
New creation	Baronet (of Glenfarquhar); 1928–1954	Extinct
