= The Mariner's Mirror =

- Discipline: Naval and maritime history, nautical archaeology
- Language: English
- Edited by: Jack Abernethy

Publication details
- History: 1911–present
- Publisher: Society for Nautical Research (United Kingdom)

Standard abbreviations
- ISO 4: Mar.'s Mirror

Indexing
- ISSN: 0025-3359

Links
- Journal homepage

The Mariner's Mirror is the quarterly academic journal of the Society for Nautical Research in the United Kingdom. It was established in 1911 and is abstracted and indexed by Scopus. It is published in partnership with Taylor & Francis. The Mariner's Mirror is ranked by the European Reference Index for the Humanities (ERIH) as an INT1 journal (the highest classification), which has internationally recognised scholarly significance with high visibility and influence among researchers in the various research domains in different countries, regularly cited all over the world.

== List of editors ==
- 1911-12 - L.G. Carr Laughton
- 1913-22 - R.C. Anderson
- 1923-31 - W.G. Perrin
- 1931-32 - R.C. Anderson
- 1932-39 - David Bonner-Smith
- 1939-46 - R.C. Anderson
- 1946-54 - Commander Hilary Poland Mead
- 1954-61 - George Worcester
- 1961-71 - Captain T. Davys Manning
- 1971-79 - Professor Christopher Lloyd
- 1979-91 - Brian Dolley
- 1991-2000 - Michael Duffy, D.Phil.
- 2001-05 - Richard Harding
- 2005-13 - Hugh Murphy
- 2013-25 - Martin Bellamy
- 2026- - Jack Abernethy
