= Caird baronets =

Set index for Caird baronets

There have been two baronetcies created for persons with the surname Caird, both in the Baronetage of the United Kingdom. Both creations are extinct.

- Caird baronets of Belmont Castle (1913): see Sir James Key Caird, 1st Baronet (1837–1916)
- Caird baronets of Glenfarquhar (1928): see Sir James Caird, 1st Baronet (1864–1954)
