= Society for Nautical Research =

British historical society

The Society for Nautical Research is a British society that conducts research and sponsors projects related to maritime history worldwide.

Founded in 1910, the Society initially encouraged research into seafaring, ship-building, the language and customs of the sea, and other items of nautical interest.

The Chairman of the Society is David Davies. Past chairmen include Alan Villiers, Michael Lloyd, Richard Harding and the immediate past chairman, Admiral Sir Kenneth Eaton.

== Past projects ==
=== HMS Victory preservation ===
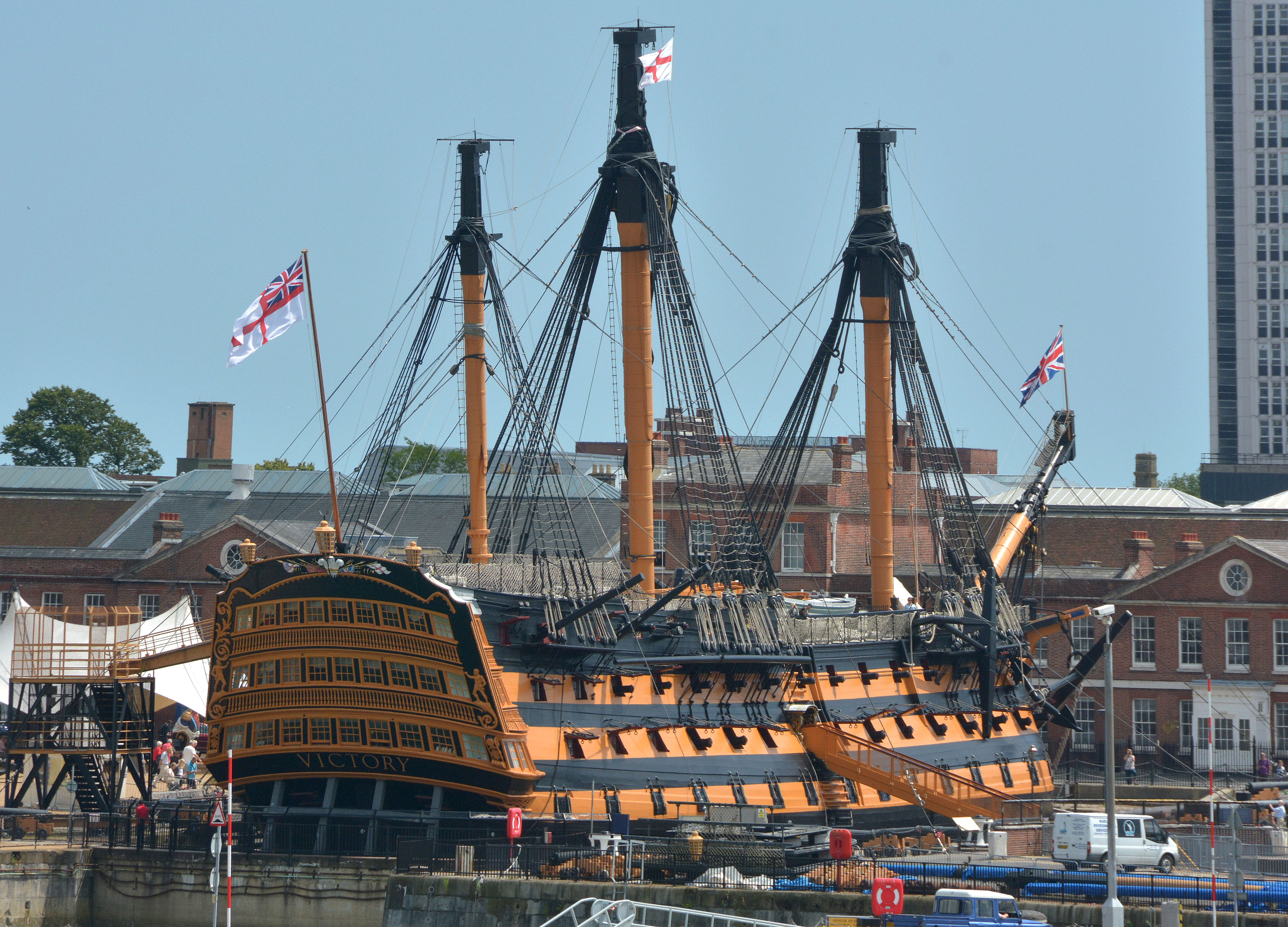
The Society led a public appeal in 1922 to save HMS Victory and continues to support the ship today.

In 1922 the Society initiated a public appeal in the United Kingdom to raise funds to save Vice-Admiral Horatio Nelson's flagship HMS Victory. Launched in 1765, the ship was in very poor condition by 1922. Sir James Caird, and the Save The Victory Fund raised sufficient funds to secure HMS Victory in dry dock in Portsmouth and provide a permanent endowment for the ship. The Society established The Victory Technical Committee to research preservation measures for the Victory and to conserved its artifacts in the new Victory Museum.

In 1972, the Victory Museum expanded to become the Portsmouth Royal Naval Museum, under Admiralty administration. It later became the National Museum of the Royal Navy, Portsmouth.

The Society still supports HMS Victory by funding research into areas such as paint samples and wood marks. Since 1922 the Society has provided over £1 million to the ship's upkeep.

=== The National Maritime Museum ===
In 1913 the Society helped reorganise and rationalise the collection of the Royal Naval Museum in the Royal Naval College, Greenwich. During World War I, the collection was dispersed for safekeeping.

In 1924 the Society catalogued and inventoried the collections. In 1925 during a meeting of the Society's Council, the concept of a National Maritime Museum was raised for the first time. The task of setting up a permanent home for the Admiralty's collection of ship models was given to a new Trust.

In 1927 the Admiralty made an official announcement:

It having become necessary for a body of trustees to be appointed to take charge of the interests and property of the National Naval and Nautical Museum which is eventually to be accommodated in the Queen's House at Greenwich, The First Lord of the Admiralty has obtained consent of the following, Earl Stanhope DSO, Civil Lord of the Admiralty, Admiral Sir George P.W. Hope, Chairman of the Council of the Society for Nautical Research, Sir Lionel Earle KCB KCVO, Secretary of the Office of Works, Mr Roger C. Anderson, FS A, Member of the Council of the Society for Nautical Research, Prof Geoffrey Callender, FSA, Royal Naval College Greenwich.

The Trust, which was largely staffed by officials of the Society, eventually created a home for the items, prints and drawings, including the Macpherson Collection, in the National Maritime Museum at Greenwich.

=== The Macpherson Collection endowment fund ===
In 1927 The Society launched an appeal to raise £120,00 in order to save 11,000 maritime prints, drawings and paintings collected by yachtsman and collector Arthur Macpherson from being sold abroad. Caird stepped in again and purchased the entire collection.

This enabled the funds raised by public subscription to be used to establish the Macpherson Collection Endowment Fund, which purchases art, prints and drawings for the nation, which are held in the National Maritime Museum. The Macpherson Collection Endowment Fund is administered by the Society.

In September 2021, the fund helped the National Maritime Museum acquire a painting by Tilly Kettle that depicts Sir Samuel Cornish, 1st Baronet, Richard Kempenfelt and Thomas Parry on HMS Norfolk. The painting went on permanent display in the Queen's House gallery in autumn 2022.

== Research and awards ==
The Society supports new research by providing grants to students undertaking nautical research and seminars and conferences on maritime themes. It also provides financial support to the annual conference for new researchers in maritime history.

The Society presents three medals:

- The annual Anderson Medal book award, named after founder and naval scholar Dr R. C. Anderson,
- The occasionally awarded Anderson Medal for Lifetime Achievement in Maritime History.
- and the Victory Medal, awarded to those who have displayed notable dedication in the conservation of a historic vessel.

Since 2017 the Society has also organised its own conferences in partnership with other institutions. A recent example includes an event held in Bristol in 2019 with SS Great Britain and the Brunel Institute.

== The Mariner's Mirror ==
The Mariner's Mirror is the Society's peer-reviewed quarterly journal. First published in 1911, the journal publishes original papers, articles, notes and book reviews on a wide range of topics relating to humankind's relationship with the sea, including archaeology, shipbuilding and design, historic vessels, naval tactics, administration and logistics, merchant seafaring, shiphandling and seamanship and other subjects of nautical interest.

The Mariner's Mirror is ranked as an ERIH Plus journal by the European Reference Index for the Humanities and is published quarterly in collaboration with Taylor & Francis.

The Editor is Dr Martin Bellamy.

== Fellowships ==
In 2016 the society instituted Fellowships (FSNR) to recognise members' contribution to its work. As of 1 November 2018 there were 43 Fellows of the Society.

== Other Activities ==
Beginning in 2010, the group began supporting the Alan Villiers Memorial Lecture. In 2020 the Society launched a podcast covering all themes and periods of maritime history.

== Publications ==
- Mariner's Mirror (1911-date), quarterly ISSN 0025-3359
- Newsletter: Topmasts
