= Navy Records Society =

The Navy Records Society was established in 1893 as a scholarly text publication society to publish historical documents relating to the history of the Royal Navy. Professor Sir John Knox Laughton and Admiral Sir Cyprian Bridge were the key leaders who organized the society, basing it on the model of earlier organisations such as the Hakluyt Society and the Camden Society. The American naval historian, Rear Admiral Alfred Thayer Mahan, was one of the first overseas members to join the Navy Records Society.

The society has published volumes of original documents and papers almost every year since its foundation. The volumes cover all the major figures in British naval history, such as Nelson, Beatty and Cunningham, and a wide range of topics, from signals and shipbuilding to strategy and politics. In 2006 the NRS published its 150th volume.

== Recent volumes ==
| Year | Editor | Title | Volume Number |
|---|---|---|---|
| 2016 | Paul Halpern | The Mediterranean Fleet, 1930–1939 ISBN 9781317024132 | 162 |
| 2014 | Dr M. S. Seligmann, Dr F. Nägler, Professor M. Epkenhans | The Naval Route to the Abyss: The Anglo-German Naval Race, 1895–1914 ISBN 9781472440938 | 161 |
| 2013 | Professor D. M. Loades, Dr C. S. Knighton | Elizabethan Naval Administration | 160 |
| 2012 | Dr B. Jones | The Fleet Air Arm in the Second World War, Volume I, 1939–1941 | 159 |
| 2011 | Professor P. Halpern | The Royal Navy and the Mediterranean, 1919–1929 | 158 |
| 2010 | Professor D. M. Loades, Dr C. S. Knighton | The Navy of Edward VI and Mary I | 157 |
| 2010 | M. Simpson | Anglo-American Naval Relations, 1919–1939 ISBN 9781351958349 | 156 |
| 2009 | Dr J. Byrn | Naval Courts Martial, 1793–1815 | 155 |
| 2009 | P. MacDougal | Chatham Dockyard, 1815–1865. The Industrial Transformation | 154 |
| 2008 | Dr S. Rose | The Naval Miscellany, Volume VII | 153 |

== Online magazine ==
The society has recently augmented its traditional book publishing activities with the launch of its Online Magazine, an ever-expanding online archive of miscellaneous British naval records. The online collection includes records in archives and museums as well as those in private collections which would otherwise never be seen. New postings to the archive are made at least once per month throughout the year. Every posting receives a detailed introduction explaining how or why the record is important and is posted alongside relevant links in the collection of the Royal Museums Greenwich and, where appropriate, relevant videos. Members can share their knowledge and comment on every posting.
