= William N. Still Jr. =

American historian (1932–2023)

- Born: William Norwood Still Jr. 1932; Columbus, Mississippi, U.S.
- Died: January 8, 2023 (aged 90); Greenville, North Carolina, U.S.

Academic background
- Education: University of Alabama
- Thesis: The construction and fitting out of ironclad vessels-of-war within the Confederacy (1964)
- Doctoral advisor: Robert Erwin Johnson

Academic work
- Discipline: Historian
- Sub-discipline: Maritime history, United States Civil War history
- Institutions: Mississippi University for Women; East Carolina University

William Norwood Still Jr. (1932 – January 8, 2023) was an American maritime historian. He was the first director of the program in maritime history at East Carolina University and a noted author of works on U.S. Civil War history and U.S. naval history.

== Early life and education ==
The son of William Norwood Still and his wife Helen Morris Still, William "Bill" Still attended Mississippi College, where he earned his Bachelor of Arts degree in 1953. On June 5, 1953, he married Mildred Boling (died January 23, 2009), with whom he had four children.

After serving in the United States Navy in 1954–1956, Still went on to the University of Alabama, where he earned his Master of Arts degree in 1958 with a thesis on "The history of the CSS Arkansas" and his Ph.D. in 1964 with a dissertation on "The construction and fitting out of ironclad vessels-of-war within the Confederacy", completed under the supervision of Professor Robert Erwin Johnson.

== Academic career ==
Mississippi University for Women gave Still his first academic appointment in 1959, when he was appointed an instructor and later an assistant professor of history. In 1968, East Carolina University appointed him associate professor of history and later full professor. In 1982, he became the founding director of ECU's Program in Maritime history and Underwater archaeology. Following his retirement and move in 1994 to his retirement residence in Kailua, Hawaii, the University of Hawaiʻi appointed him as adjunct researcher in 1995.

A leading figure in the academic field of maritime history, the North American Society for Oceanic History (NASOH) awarded Still its K. Jack Bauer Award in 1988. Subsequently, Still became an active leader of NASOH, serving as vice president in 1988–1992 and president from 1992 to 1994. In addition, Still served on the advisory council of the Society of Civil War Historians, 1987–1997 and on the editorial advisory board of The American Neptune from 1984 to 2002, Civil War Times Illustrated from 1994, and the Secretary of the Navy's Advisory Subcommittee on Naval History.

In 1989–1990, Still occupied the Secretary of the Navy Research Chair in Naval History at the Naval Historical Center. In addition, he served on the advisory board of the National Maritime Alliance and the United States Commission on Military History.

== Death ==
Still died on January 8, 2023, at the age of 90.

== Awards ==
- The Confederate Museum, Jefferson Davis Award, 1986.
- The North American Society for Oceanic History K. Jack Bauer Award, 1988
- Kansas City, Civil War Roundtable, President Harry Truman Award, 1989.
- North Carolina Literary and History Association, Christopher Crittenden Memorial Award, 1992.
- Theodore and Franklin D. Roosevelt Prize in Naval History, 2007.
- John Lyman Book Awards, 2006 for Crisis at Sea
- Commodore Dudley W. Knox Naval History Lifetime Achievement Award, 2013.

== Published works ==
- The Confederate States Navy at Mobile, 1861 to August 1864, Montgomery, Alabama: Alabama State Department of Archives and History; 1968.
- Confederate shipbuilding, Athens: University of Georgia Press, 1969.
- Iron afloat: the story of the Confederate armorclads, Nashville, Tennessee: Vanderbilt University Press, 1971.
- American sea power in the old world: the United States Navy in European and Near Eastern waters, 1865-1917, Westport, Connecticut: Greenwood Press, 1980.
- Monitor builders: a historical study of the principal firms and individuals involved in the construction of USS Monitor, by William N. Still Jr.; prepared for United States Department of Commerce, National Oceanic and Atmospheric Administration, Marine and Estuarine Management Division. Washington, D.C.: National Maritime Initiative, Division of History, National Park Service, Dept of the Interior, 1988.
- Two years on the Alabama, by Arthur Sinclair; with an introduction and notes by William N. Still Jr.
- The Queenstown patrol, 1917: the diary of commander Joseph Knefler Taussig, U.S. Navy, edited by William N. Still Jr. Newport, R.I.: Naval War College Press, 1996.
- The Confederate Navy: the ships, men and organization, 1861-65, edited by William N. Still Jr.; introduction by William S. Dudley. London : Conway Maritime Press, 1997.
- Raiders & blockaders: the American Civil War afloat, by William N. Still Jr., John M. Taylor, and Norman C. Delaney. Washington, DC: Brassey's, 1998.
- Crisis at sea: the United States Navy in European waters in World War I, by William N. Still Jr.; foreword by James C. Bradford and Gene A. Smith. Gainesville: University Press of Florida, 2006.

== Sources ==
- Marquis Who's Who
- University of Alabama Library

== External sources ==
- William N. Still Jr. Papers (#139), East Carolina Manuscript Collection, J. Y. Joyner Library, East Carolina University
- ECU Chronicles Our History
