= Walter S. DeLany =

United States Navy admiral (1891–1980)

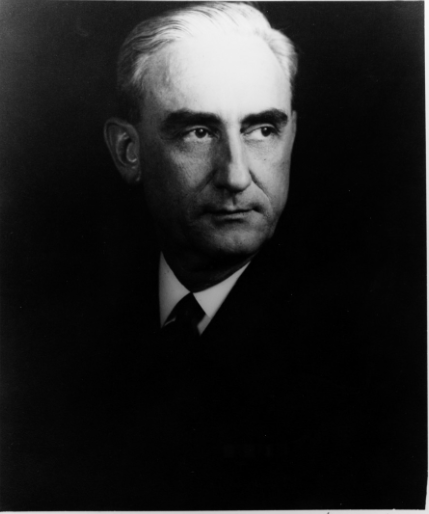
- DeLany as a rear admiral on 22 January 1944.
- Born: 21 January 1891; Reading, Pennsylvania, U.S.
- Died: 21 September 1980 (aged 89); Bethesda, Maryland, U.S.
- Burial place: United States Naval Academy Cemetery, Annapolis, Maryland
- Military career
- Branch: United States Navy
- Service years: 1912–1953
- Rank: Vice admiral
- Commands: USS Paulding (DD-22); Navy Recruiting Station, Albany, New York; Destroyer Division 7; USS New Orleans (CA-32); Battleships-Cruisers, Pacific Fleet; 3rd Naval District; Eastern Sea Frontier; Atlantic Reserve Fleet
- Conflicts: Occupation of Veracruz; Battle of Verzcruz; World War I; Atlantic campaign; World War II; Pacific War; Guadalcanal campaign; Battle of the Eastern Solomons; Cold War
- Other work: Deputy Administrator for Mutual Defense Assistance Control; President, Naval Historical Foundation; Navy Relief Society

Walter S. DeLany (21 January 1891 – 21 September 1980) was a United States Navy vice admiral. During a 41-year naval career, he served in the United States occupation of Veracruz, World War I, World War II, and the Cold War. In retirement, he was Deputy Administrator for Mutual Defense Assistance Control in the United States Department of Defense and United States Department of State, president of the Naval Historical Foundation, and an officer of the Navy Relief Society.

== Biography ==
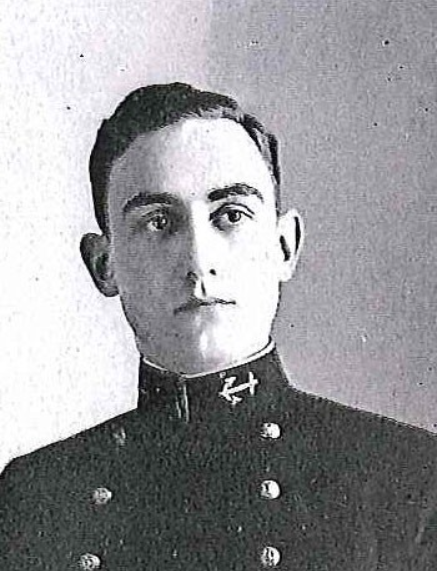
A young Walter S. DeLany.

=== Early life ===
Walter Stanley DeLany was born in Reading, Pennsylvania, on 21 January 1891, the son of Irvin F. DeLany and the former Mary E. Dunkle. He attended Reading Senior High School before his appointment from Pennsylvania to the United States Naval Academy in 1908. While a midshipman at the Naval Academy, he was a cheerleader and a member of the class basketball and lacrosse teams. He graduated on 7 June 1912.

=== Naval career ===
==== Early career ====
DeLany was commissioned as an ensign on his graduation day, 7 June 1912, and reported aboard the battleship USS Minnesota. During his tour aboard her, Minnesota operated in the Caribbean to represent and protect American interests as unrest began to break out in several countries in the region. During the first half of 1912, she patrolled Cuban waters and was at Guantanamo Bay Naval Base in Cuba from 7 to 22 June 1912 to support the suppression of an insurrection on the island. In mid-1913, she patrolled along the east coast of Mexico during the Mexican Revolution. She returned to Mexico from 26 January to 7 August 1914, participating in the Battle of Veracruz and subsequent occupation of Veracruz, and returned to Veracruz from 11 October to 19 December 1914, during which period the occupation came to an end. Minnesota returned to the United States in 1915.

DeLany detached from Minnesota in May 1915 and received a promotion to lieutenant (junior grade) on 8 June 1915. Following torpedo instruction aboard the armored cruiser USS Montana, he reported to the Fore River Shipbuilding Company at Quincy, Massachusetts, for duty in connection with fitting out the new battleship USS Nevada. He served aboard Nevada from her commissioning on 11 March 1916.

==== World War I ====
DeLany was serving aboard Nevada when the United States entered World War I with its declaration of war on the German Empire on 6 April 1917. In May 1917, he transferred to the destroyer USS Wilkes, which escorted an American troop convoy from New York City to Saint Nazaire, France, in June 1917, then took up duties from July 1917 defending Allied shipping during the Atlantic U-boat campaign of World War I from a base at Queenstown, Ireland. Wilkes never encountered a German submarine during the war, but did rescue 23 survivors of the torpedoed British merchant ship SS Purley on 25 July 1917.

DeLany returned to the United States in August 1918 and assumed duty as executive officer of the destroyer USS Craven upon her commissioning on 19 October 1918. Craven was still in the United States when World War I came to an end with an armistice with Germany on 11 November 1918.

During the war, DeLany received temporary promotions to lieutenant and lieutenant commander. He then reverted to the permanent rank of lieutenant, to which he was promoted in 1918.

==== Interwar period ====
DeLany served aboard Craven until June 1919 as she operated along the United States East Coast and in the Caribbean. He then briefly commanded the destroyer USS Paulding before taking charge of the Navy Recruiting Station in Albany, New York in July 1919.

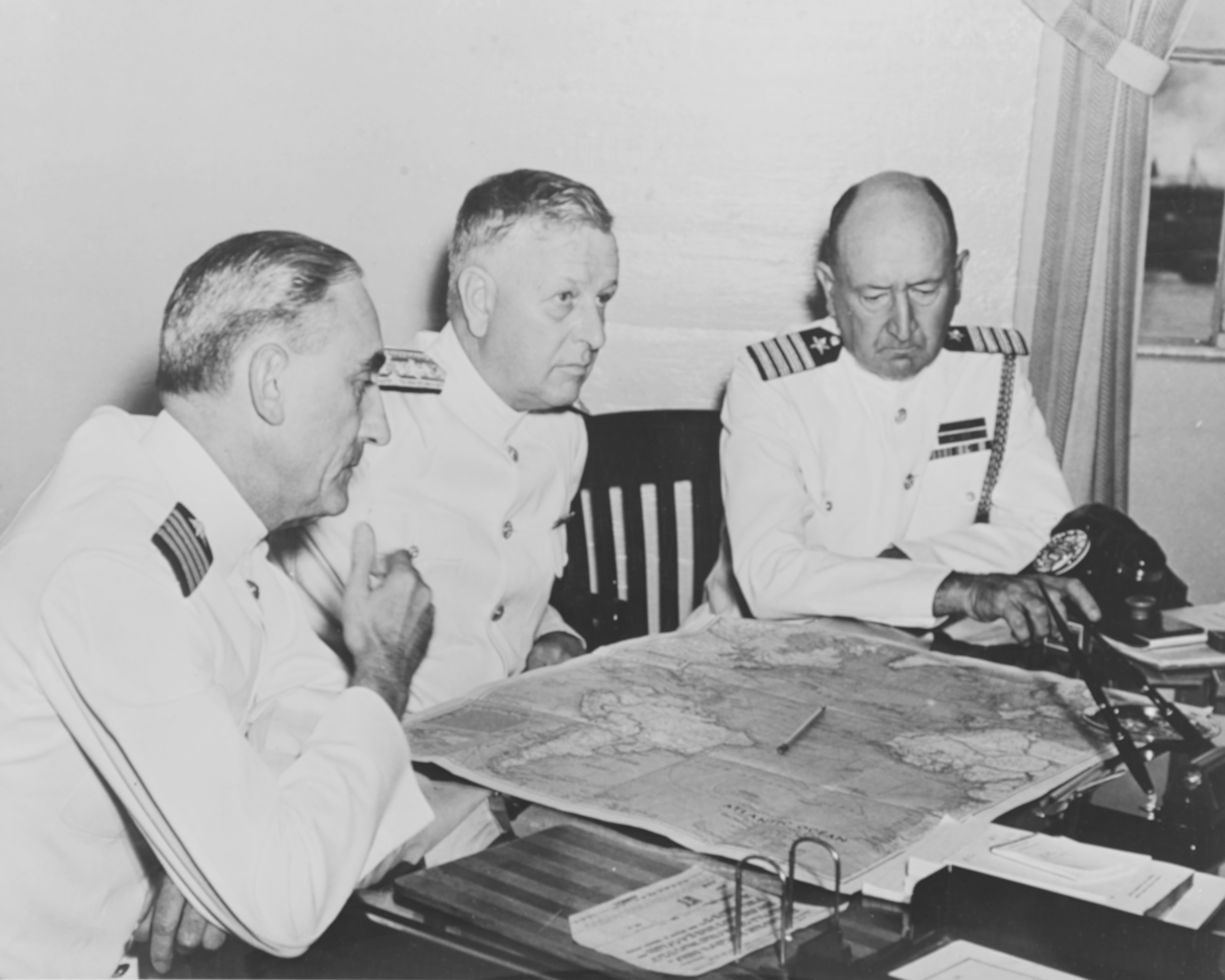
Admiral Husband E. Kimmel, Commander-in-Chief, Pacific Fleet (center) consults with his chief of staff, Captain William W. Smith, right, and his operations officer and assistant chief of staff, Captain Walter S. DeLany (left) at Pearl Harbor, Hawaii, in 1941.

DeLany left the recruiting station in November 1921, when he reported aboard the newly commissioned transport USS Argonne (AP-4) for duty as her navigator and first lieutenant. During his tour aboard her, Argonne made her maiden voyage – to the Caribbean – followed by a number of voyages from the U.S. East Coast to East Asia. While aboard Argonne, he received a permanent promotion to lieutenant commander in 1922.

In June 1923 DeLany became executive officer of the destroyer USS Lamson (DD-328), operating along the U.S. East Coast and in the Caribbean, and from January to October 1924 he served as squadron gunnery officer of Destroyer Squadron Nine, Scouting Fleet. He had duty in the Training Division of the Bureau of Navigation at the United States Department of the Navy in Washington, D.C., from October 1924 until January 1927, and for three years thereafter served as first lieutenant aboard the battleship USS Oklahoma (BB-37). While he was aboard Oklahoma, she was reassigned to the Scouting Fleet early in 1927, made a voyage from the United States West Coast to the U.S. East Coast, picked up midshipmen from the U.S. Naval Academy for the year's midshipman cruise, and carried the midshipmen through the Panama Canal to San Francisco, California, before the making the return journey with stops in the Caribbean. She then underwent modernization at Philadelphia, Pennsylvania, from 1927 to 1929 before rejoining the Scouting Fleet for Caribbean exercises.

DeLany returned to the Department of the Navy in February 1930 and served for three years in the Ships’ Movements Division in the Office of the Chief of Naval Operations. In July 1933 he became navigator of the battleship USS New York (BB-34) in the United States Pacific Fleet. New York operated alog the U.S. West and East Coasts and in the Caribbean and took part in fleet problems during his time aboard her. In 1935 he began duty in the executive department at the U.S. Naval Academy. On 15 July 1938, he assumed command of Destroyer Division Seven in Destroyers, Battle Force, with the destroyer USS Mugford (DD-389) as his flagship, operating along the U.S. West Coast and in the Hawaiian Islands. In May 1939 he became chief of staff and aide to Commander Cruisers, Battle Force, aboard the commander's flagship, the light cruiser USS Honolulu (CL-48), which took part in exercises along the U.S. West Coast and later moved to Pearl Harbor, Hawaii. On 1 February 1941 he was designated assistant chief of staff and operations officer on the staff of the Commander-in-Chief, United States Pacific Fleet.

==== World War II ====
The United States entered World War II with the Japanese attack on Pearl Harbor on 7 December 1941. DeLany continued in his assignment on the staff of the Commander-in-Chief, Pacific Fleet, until 23 June 1942. He was awarded the Legion of Merit for "exceptionally meritorious service" in that assignment, the award citation stating, "During this vitally important period he displayed the highest qualities of judgment and initiative, thereby contributing materially to the prosecution of the war against Japan."

On 24 June 1942 DeLany assumed command of the heavy cruiser USS New Orleans (CA-32), then operating in the Pacific Theater. As part of the screen of the aircraft carrier USS Saratoga (CV-3), New Orleans participated in the Guadalcanal campaign including the Battle of the Eastern Solomons, during his tour in command. In the latter battle, New Orleans helped to fight off heavy Japanese air attacks targeting Saratoga. After the Japanese submarine I-26 torpedoed Saratoga on 31 August 1942, New Orleans was part of Saratoga′s escort as the aircraft carrier steamed to Pearl Harbor for repairs, arriving there on 21 September 1942.

Promoted to rear admiral with date of rank effective 26 May 1942, DeLany was detached from New Orleans to report on 12 November 1942 as Assistant Chief of Staff (Operations), to Commander-in-Chief, United States Fleet, at U.S. Navy headquarters in Washington, D.C. When the Joint Army–Navy Assessment Committee (JANAC) was created in January 1943 to assess enemy naval and merchant shipping losses during World War II, he was appointed as its chairman, a function he performed until relieved by Rear Admiral Jerauld Wright after the war. In addition, on 19 March 1943 he was redesignated Assistant Chief of Staff (Readiness), in that assignment serving as the U.S. Navy representative on the Joint Committee on New Weapons and Equipment (JNW), and was in this position when World War II ended in August 1945. He was awarded a second Legion of Merit for "exceptionally meritorious service … from November 1942 to August 1945 … During this long period, by the exercise of great foresight, broad vision, unusual initiative, sound judgment, superior professional knowledge, and high executive ability, he directed the improvement and development of means, methods, and practices which kept the United States Fleet in a continually higher state of readiness for battle than those of the enemies and contributed in a great degree to the successful prosecution of the war."

==== Post-World War II and Cold War ====
After a reorganization in October 1945, DeLany continued as head of the Operational Readiness Section of the Office of the Chief of Naval Operations and headed the post-World War II Training Policy Board. On 26 January 1946, he was given the temporary rank of vice admiral as Commander Battleships-Cruisers, Pacific Fleet, with the heavy cruiser USS St. Paul (CA-73) as his flagship. He continued in that command until June 1948.

Ordered to the Third Naval District in New York City, he became commandant of that district, reverting to his permanent rank of rear admiral upon assuming command on 1 July 1948. He commanded the district until May 1952. He then became Commander Eastern Sea Frontier, with additional duty as Commander Atlantic Reserve Fleet, with the accompanying rank of vice admiral, and served as such until relieved of all active duty pending his transfer to the Retired List of the Navy on 1 February 1953.

== Retirement ==
Upon DeLany's retirement, the City of New York, at a civic ceremony, awarded him its gold medal for "Distinguished and Outstanding Public Service."

Subsequent to DeLany's retirement, President Dwight D. Eisenhower appointed him to serve as Deputy Administrator for Mutual Defense Assistance Control in the United States Department of Defense′s United States Foreign Operations Administration, and the United States Senate confirmed this appointment in May 1953. He remained in this position when it moved to the United States Department of State′s International Cooperation Administration in 1955, serving continuously from May 1953 until March 1961, coordinating East–West strategic trade projects.

DeLany became associated with the Naval Historical Foundation in 1961 and became its president in 1967, serving in that capacity until his death. Among its other activities, the Naval Historical Foundation published a series of pamphlets on subjects of interest in U.S. Navy history. As part of the series, DeLany wrote Bayly′s Navy, a short memoir of his World War I service aboard USS Wilkes at Queenstown, Ireland. The foundation published it in the fall of 1980, shortly after DeLany's death. DeLany had a passion for the Navy Department Library, which became part of the Naval Historical Center (later renamed the Naval History and Heritage Command) during his tenure as president, and in recognition of his support for the library its reading room was dedicated in his honor.

DeLany also was active in the Navy Relief Society, both as a member of its board of managers and as chairman of its finance committee.

== Personal life ==
DeLany married the former Lou May Sharman. The couple had one daughter, Kathryn DeLany Fawkes; one son, U.S. Navy Captain Walter S. DeLany Jr.; and four grandchildren.

DeLany was an original member of the Queenstown Association — a veterans organization for U.S. Navy and Royal Navy personnel who served together at Queenstown, Ireland, during World War I – until its dissolution in 1961, as well as of the Army and Navy Club in Washington, D.C., the Huguenot Society in Washington, D.C., and the Sons of the Revolution. He was a member of All Souls Memorial Episcopal Church in Washington, D.C., and served on its vestry from 1965 to 1968 and as its senior warden from 1973 to 1975.

== Death ==
Suffering from heart disease and pneumonia, DeLany died at the National Naval Medical Center in Bethesda, Maryland, on 21 September 1980. He is buried at the United States Naval Academy Cemetery in Annapolis, Maryland.

== Honors and awards ==
- Legion of Merit (two awards)
- National Defense Service Medal
- Mexican Service Medal
- World War I Victory Medal with Destroyer Clasp
- American Defense Service Medal
- American Campaign Medal
- Asiatic-Pacific Campaign Medal
- World War II Victory Medal
- Navy Occupation Service Medal with Asia Clasp
- China Service Medal
- Special Collar Order of Yun Hui (Republic of China)
- Gold Medal for Distinguished and Outstanding Public Service (New York City)

== See also ==
Military offices
Preceded by John E. Wilkes (acting)	Commander, Eastern Sea Frontier; April 1952 – January 1953	Succeeded by Laurance T. DuBose
