= Christopher McKee (historian) =

American naval historian (born 1935)

- Born: June 14, 1935 (age 91); New York City, U.S.
- Education: University of St. Thomas; University of Michigan (MLS)
- Occupations: Naval historian; librarian; educator

Christopher McKee (born June 14, 1935) is an American naval historian, librarian, and educator.

== Early life and education ==
Mckee graduated from the University of St. Thomas in Houston in 1957 and completed his Master of Library Science degree at the University of Michigan in 1960.

== Professional career ==
McKee has worked at various institutions of higher learning as a librarian, historian, and educator. These institutions include Washington and Lee University (1958–1962), Southern Illinois University, Edwardsville (1962–1972), and Grinnell College (1972–2006). McKee also held the Secretary of the Navy Research Chair in Naval History at the Naval Historical Center (1990–1991) and was a NEH fellow at the Newberry Library (1978–79).

== Awards ==
McKee has been recognized nationally for his contributions to the study of naval history. Awards include the U.S. Naval History prize (1985) of the John Lyman Book awards of the North American Society for Oceanic History, and the Samuel Eliot Morison Award of the USS Constitution Museum (1993). He was awarded the 2016 Commodore Dudley W. Knox Naval History Lifetime Achievement Award presented by the Naval Historical Foundation.

== Published works ==
- Edward Preble: A Naval Biography, 1761-1807 (1972)
- A Gentlemanly and Honorable Profession: The Creation of the U. S. Naval Officer Corps, 1794-1815 (1991)
- Sober Men and True: Sailor Lives in the Royal Navy, 1900-1945 (2002)
- Ungentle Goodnights: Life in a Home for Elderly and Disabled Naval Sailors and Marines and the Perilous Seafaring Careers That Brought Them There (2018).
