= Vincent Murphy =

Vincent Murphy may refer to:

== First name and surname ==
- Vincent B. Murphy (1888–1956), American politician
- Vincent J. Murphy (1893–1976), American politician and labor leader
- Vincent R. Murphy (1896–1974), American Navy officer
- Timothy V. Murphy (born 1960), Irish actor
- Vinnie Murphy (born 1906), Irish Gaelic footballer
- Vincent Murphy (high jumper) (born 1914), winner of the 1933 high jump at the NCAA Division I Outdoor Track and Field Championships

== Middle name and surname ==
- James Vincent Murphy (1880–1946), Irish translator, writer, lecturer and journalist
- Nick Vincent Murphy (born 1977), Irish screenwriter and novelist
- Patrick V. Murphy (Patrick Vincent Murphy; 1920–2011), American police officer
