= Vincent R. Murphy =

American Navy officer (c.1896–1974)

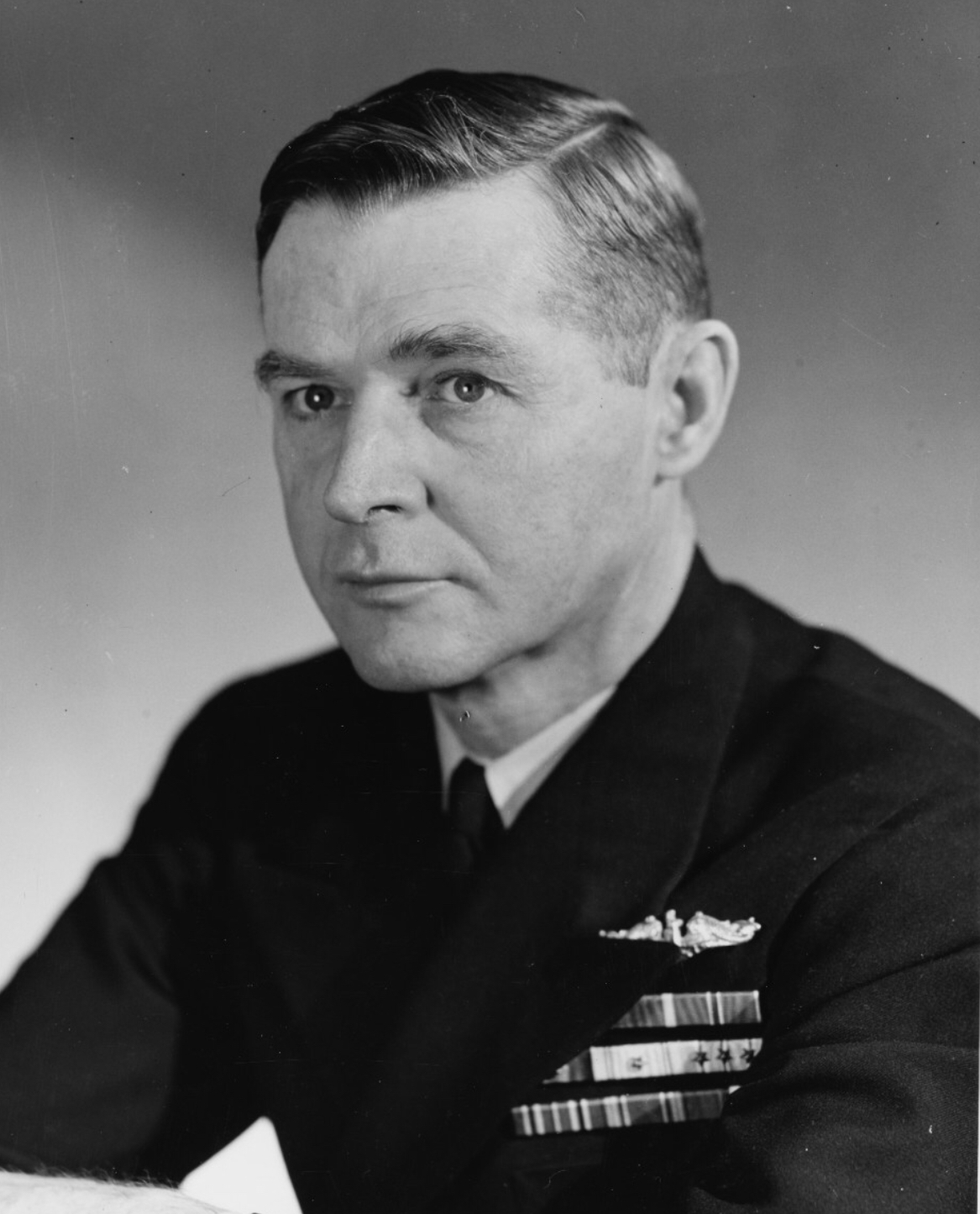
- Born: Vincent Raphael Murphy c. 1896; Norfolk, Virginia, US
- Died: July 9, 1974 (aged 77–78)
- Branch: Navy
- Service years: 1917–1946
- Rank: Vice admiral
- Conflicts: World War I; World War II; Attack on Pearl Harbor

Vice admiral Vincent Raphael Murphy (c. 1896 – July 9, 1974) was an American Navy officer.

== Biography ==
Born c. 1896 in Norfolk, Virginia, Murphy graduated from the United States Naval Academy in 1917, and served on the USS Montana during World War I. Between the World Wars, he commanded other ships and served as a navigator on the USS Texas. During World War II, he was commander-in-chief of the Pacific Fleet in Pearl Harbor during the attack. he commanded the USS Alabama, being promoted to assistant Chief of Naval Operations for logistic plans, replacing Fred D. Kirtland.

He served as director of the Naval History and Heritage Command from December 1945, until his retirement in June 1946. He served as vice-president of the Navy-Marine Corps Relief Society, retiring again in 1962. Murphy lived in Washington, D.C.. He died on July 9, 1974, at the Walter Reed National Military Medical Center, aged 77–78.
