= Harold D. Langley =

American diplomat and naval historian (1925–2020)

Harold David Langley (15 February 1925 – 29 July 2020) was an American diplomatic and naval historian who served as associate curator of naval history at the Smithsonian Institution from 1969 to 1996. As a naval historian, he was a pioneer in exploring American naval social and medical history.

== Early life and education ==
Langley was born in Amsterdam, New York. The son of Walter Benedict Langley and Anna Mae McCaffrey, Harold Langley joined the United States Army at the age of eighteen and served from 1943 to 1946, receiving along with his unit the Army Meritorious Service Medal and the Asiatic–Pacific Campaign Medal. Following his military service, he attended Catholic University of America, where he earned his A.B. in 1950. Going on for graduate work, he attended the University of Pennsylvania, where he earned his M.A. in 1951 and his Phd in 1960 with a dissertation on "The Humanitarians and the United States Navy, 1798–1862."

== Professional career ==
Langley began his professional career at the Library of Congress, Manuscripts Division, in Washington, D.C., where he served as a manuscripts assistant in 1951–52, while a graduate student. Moving to the University of Pennsylvania Libraries in Philadelphia, Pennsylvania, where he was a graduate student, he served as a manuscripts specialist, rare book collection, 1952–54. Returning to the Library of Congress in Washington, he was a manuscripts specialist, there in 1954–55. In 1955, Marywood College in Scranton, Pennsylvania, appointed him assistant professor of history. He remained there until 1957, when he received an appointment as a diplomatic historian in the U.S. Department of State. In 1964, Catholic University of America appointed him associate professor, and in 1968 promoted him to full professor in 1968. In 1969, the Smithsonian Institution, Washington, D.C., appointed him associate curator of naval history. While holding that position, he was also an adjunct professor of American history at the Catholic University of America from 1971 to 2001.

He died in Alexandria, Virginia, in July 2020.

== Awards ==
- 1995 John Lyman Book Awards in the category of Science and Technology for History of Medicine in the Early U.S. Navy
- 2000 K. Jack Bauer Award, North American Society for Oceanic History
- 2001 Samuel Eliot Morison Award, USS Constitution Museum
- 2014 Commodore Dudley W. Knox Naval History Lifetime Achievement Award, Naval Historical Foundation

== Published works ==
- (Editor with others) Documents on Germany, 1944–59, (Washington: U.S. Government Printing Office, 1959).
- (Editor with others) Documents on Disarmament, 1960, (Washington: U.S. Government Printing Office, 1961).
- (Compiler and co-editor) Documents on International Aspects of the Exploration and Use of Outer Space, 1954–1962, (Washington: U.S. Government Printing Office, 1963.)
- Social Reform in the United States Navy, 1798–1862, (Champaign-Urbana: University of Illinois Press, 1967).
- St. Stephen Martyr Roman Catholic Church and Community, 1867–1967. (Washington, D.C.: St. Stephen Martyr Centennial Committee, 1968).
- To Utah with the Dragoons and glimpses of life in Arizona and California, 1858–1859 edited by Harold D. Langley. (Salt Lake City: University of Utah Press, c.1974).
- (Editor with Francis Loewenheim and Manfred Jonas) Roosevelt and Churchill: Their Secret Wartime Correspondence. (New York: Saturday Review Press, 1975).
- (Editor) So Proudly We Hail: The History of the United States Flag. (Washington: Smithsonian Institution Press, 1981).
- A History of Medicine in the Early U.S. Navy. (Baltimore: Johns Hopkins University Press, 1995).

== Reviews ==
Langley's examination of the early practice of naval medicine contains some enlightening and shocking revelations. Foremost is the ponderous movement of bureaucracies, most notably the Navy Department, which could not produce a decision on the means to provide care and treatment for wounded and infirm sailors.

== Sources ==
- Contemporary Authors
