= Robert Erwin Johnson =

American naval historian

Robert Erwin Johnson (3 February 1923 – 28 January 2008) was a University of Alabama professor of history and considered "one of the finest scholars of the nineteenth century U.S. Navy and U.S. Coast Guard".

== Early life and education ==
Johnson was born in Marshfield, Oregon to Franz Oscar Johnson, a farmer, and his wife, Agnes Sandquist. Johnson enlisted in the U.S. Coast Guard in 1941 and served until 1946 on USCGC Haida After his wartime service at sea as a quartermaster, he attended the Oregon State Agricultural College from 1946 to 1948, then transferred to the University of Oregon, where he earned his Bachelor of Arts degree and was elected Phi Beta Kappa in 1951. From 1951 to 1952, he served again on active duty in the U.S. Naval Reserve, rising to Petty Officer First Class. On release from active duty, Johnson went on to complete his Master of Arts degree in 1953. Going on for further graduate work, he attended the Claremont Graduate School, where he earned his Ph.D. in 1956 with a thesis on "United States Naval Forces on Pacific Station, 1818–1923". On 19 December 1959, he married Vivian Ellis.

== Academic career ==
Immediately on completion of his doctoral work in 1956, the University of Alabama appointed him assistant professor in the faculty of history. He was promoted to associate professor in 1963, and to professor of history in 1967. He retired in 1993 after serving as interim chairman of the history department during a critical time of transition for the history department.

A member of the Democratic Party, he was also a member of the American Historical Association, Society for Nautical Research, World Ship Society, Naval Historical Foundation, and the United States Naval Institute.

He received numerous awards for his publications on naval history, including his book, Guardians of the Sea, which won the Theodore and Franklin D. Roosevelt Prize in Naval History from the New York Council of the Navy League of the United States, the North American Society for Oceanic History's John Lyman Book Award for the best book in U.S. naval history, and the U.S. Naval Institute's Special Award of Merit.

Johnson died in Tuscaloosa, Alabama on 28 January 2008.

== Works ==
- Thence Round Cape Horn: The Story of United States Naval Forces on Pacific Station, 1818-1923. Annapolis, Maryland: United States Naval Institute, 1963.
- Rear Admiral John Rodgers, 1812–1882. Annapolis, Maryland: United States Naval Institute, 1967.
- Far China Station: The U.S. Navy in Asian Waters, 1800–1898. Annapolis, Maryland: Naval Institute Press, 1979.
- Guardians of the Sea: History of the United States Coast Guard, 1915 to the Present. Annapolis, Maryland: Naval Institute Press, 1987.
- Bering Sea Escort: Life Aboard a Coast Guard Cutter in World War II. Annapolis, Maryland: Naval Institute Press, 1992.

== Sources ==
- Obituary, University of Alabama News, 31 January 2008
- Gale Contemporary Authors, 2002
