= William H. White =

William H. White may refer to:

- William Hale White (1831–1913), English writer and civil servant
- William H. White (architect) (1838–1896), British architect
- William H. White (judge) (1842–1914), justice of the Washington Supreme Court
- Sir William Henry White (1845–1913), British warship designer
- William White (New Zealand politician) (1849–1900), New Zealand Member of Parliament
- William Henry "Whoop-La" White (1854–1911), American baseball pitcher and manager
- William Henry White (politician) (1865–1930), Canadian Member of Parliament from Alberta
- William H. White (publisher) (c. 1925–1989), American author, editor and publisher
- William H. White (maritime writer) (fl. 2000s), American naval historical novelist
- Bill White (Texas politician) (born William Howard White; 1954), 60th mayor of Houston, Texas

== See also ==
- William H. Whyte (1917–1999), sociologist and author of The Organization Man
- William Hadden Whyte (born 1975), British academic historian
