= David Curtis Skaggs Jr. =

Historian

David Curtis Skaggs Jr. (born 23 March 1937 in Topeka, Kansas), is an American historian of the Colonial and Early Republic periods, who spent nearly his entire academic career at Bowling Green State University in Bowling Green, Ohio.

== Early life ==
The son of David Curtis Skaggs Sr. and his wife Eleanor Elizabeth Baer Skaggs, David Skaggs attended the University of Kansas, where he earned a Bachelor of Science degree in 1959 and went on to obtain a Master of Arts degree in 1960 with a thesis on "Military contributions to the development of territorial Kansas." He was commissioned as a second lieutenant in the U.S. Army in 1959 and served from 1960 to 1962 on active duty, becoming a first lieutenant. Upon completing his military service, he attended Georgetown University, where in 1966 he earned his Ph.D. in history with a dissertation on "Democracy in Colonial Maryland, 1753-1776."

== Academic career ==
In 1965, he was appointed instructor in history at Bowling Green State University, where he rose through the academic ranks becoming assistant professor in 1966, associate professor in 1969, full professor in 1977, and professor emeritus in 2002.

He served as visiting associate professor of history at the University of Wisconsin, Madison in 1971–72; William C. Foster Visiting Fellow at the U.S. Arms Control and Disarmament Agency; Distinguished Visiting Professor at the National Defense Intelligence College in 1989; Visiting Professor of Military History and Strategy at Air University in 1990–91; visiting professor at East Carolina University, and consultant faculty member at the United States Army Command and General Staff College, 1970–1990.

== Personal life ==
Skaggs married Margo Clayton Tipton in 1961, with whom he had two sons and five grandchildren.

== Awards ==
- The North American Society for Oceanic History awarded Skaggs John Lyman Book Awards for naval history in 1997 and for biography in 2006.
- The 2012 Samuel Eliot Morison Award from the USS Constitution Museum, Boston.
- In 2019, the Naval Historical Foundation awarded Skaggs the Commodore Dudley W. Knox Naval History Lifetime Achievement Award.

== Published works ==
- Roots of Maryland democracy, 1753-1776. (Westport, Conn., Greenwood Press, 1973).
- The Old Northwest in the American Revolution: an anthology, edited by David Skaggs. (Madison : State Historical Society of Wisconsin, 1977)
- The poetic writings of Thomas Cradock, 1718-1770 edited with an introduction by David Curtis Skaggs. (Newark: University of Delaware Press; London : Associated University Presses, 1983)
- Treatise on partisan warfare [Abhandlung über den kleinen Krieg] (1785) by Johann Ewald; translation, introduction, and annotation by Robert A. Selig and David Curtis Skaggs. (New York: Greenwood Press, 1991)
- War on the Great Lakes: essays commemorating the 175th anniversary of the Battle of Lake Erie, edited by William Jeffrey Welsh and David Curtis Skaggs. (Kent, Ohio: Kent State University Press, 1991).
- A signal victory: the Lake Erie campaign, 1812-1813, by David Curtis Skaggs and Gerard T. Altoff. (Annapolis, Md. : Naval Institute Press, 1997).
- The Sixty Years’ War for the Great Lakes, 1754-1814, edited by David Curtis Skaggs and Larry L. Nelson. (East Lansing: Michigan State University Press, 2001)
- Thomas Macdonough : master of command in the early U.S. Navy (Annapolis, Md.: Naval Institute Press, 2003)
- Oliver Hazard Perry: honor, courage, and patriotism in the early U.S. Navy. (Annapolis, Md. : Naval Institute Press, 2006)
- The Battle of Lake Erie and Its Aftermath: A Reassessment, edited by David Curtis Skaggs (Kent, Ohio: Kent State University Press, 2013).
- William Henry Harrison and the Conquest of the Ohio Country (Baltimore: Johns Hopkins University Press, 2014)
