= K. Jack Bauer =

American naval historian (1926–1987)

- Born: Karl Jack Bauer; July 30, 1926; Springfield, Ohio, U.S.
- Died: September 17, 1987 (aged 61); Troy, New York, U.S.
- Education: Harvard College (BA); Indiana University (MA, PhD)
- Occupation: Historian
- Spouse: Dorothy Sargent (m. 1951)
- Children: 3

Karl Jack Bauer (July 30, 1926 in Springfield, Ohio – September 17, 1987 in Troy, New York), was one of the founders of the North American Society for Oceanic History (NASOH) and a well-known naval historian. NASOH's K. Jack Bauer Award is named in his memory.

== Early life and education ==
The son of Charles August Bauer, an engineer, and Isabelle Fairbanks, Jack Bauer attended Harvard College, where he completed his Bachelor of Arts degree in 1948. He went on to graduate study at Indiana University, where he earned his Master of Arts in 1949 with a thesis on "United States naval shipbuilding programs, 1775-1860" and his Ph.D. degree in 1953 with a dissertation on "United States naval operations during the Mexican War."

On August 18, 1951, he married Dorothy Sargent, with whom he had three children: Eric, Neil, and Anne.

== Academic career ==
Bauer worked at the National Archives as an archivist in 1954–1955, then in 1955–1957 was appointed a historian with the United States Marine Corps Historical Branch, where he worked on a volume of the USMC history of World War II. In 1957, he transferred to the Naval History Division, where he worked with Samuel Eliot Morison’s staff in preparing Morison's monumental History of U.S. Naval Operations in World War II. After four years as an assistant professor at Morris Harvey College from 1961 to 1965, Rensselaer Polytechnic Institute appointed him an associate professor in 1965 and then professor of history in 1970, serving there for the remainder of his career. In 1977–1978, he was visiting professor at the U.S. Army Command and General Staff College at Fort Leavenworth, Kansas.

The United States Navy appointed Bauer to the Secretary of the Navy's Advisory Committee on Naval History and he served as member of council of the American Military Institute, 1959–1962 and in 1980.

== Published works ==
- List of World War I Signal Corps Films (Record Group 111) (National Archives, 1957)
- The Dictionary of American Naval Fighting Ships. (Naval History Division, 1959);
- Surfboats and Horse Marines: U.S. Naval Operations in the Mexican War, 1846-48 (Naval Institute Press, 1969)
- Ships of the Navy – Combat Vessels (Rensselaer Polytechnic Institute, 1970); revised and extended by Stephen S. Roberts as Register of Ships of the U.S. Navy, 1775–1990: Major Combatants (Greenwood Press, 1995).
- The Mexican War, 1846–1848 (Macmillan, 1974).
- Soldiering : the Civil War diary of Rice C. Bull, 123rd New York Volunteer Infantry, edited by K. Jack Bauer. San Rafael, California : Presidio Press, 1977.
- American Secretaries of the Navy, (Naval Institute Press, 1980).
- The New American State Papers: Naval Affairs (Scholarly Resources, 1981.
- Ports in the West edited with Benjamin F. Gilbert, (Sunflower University Press, 1983).
- History of navigation & navigation improvements on the Pacific coast by Anthony F. Turhollow, Benjamin F. Gilbert, K. Jack Bauer. [Fort Belvoir, Va.?] : National Waterways Study, U.S. Army Engineer Water Resources Support Center, Institute for Water Resources; Washington, D.C. : For sale by the Superintendent of Documents, U.S. G.P.O., [1983].
- U.S. Naval and Marine Corps Bases with Paolo Coletta, (Greenwood Press, 1985).
- Soldier, Planter, Statesman: Zachary Taylor and the Old Southwest (Louisiana State University Press, 1986).
- A maritime history of the United States : the role of America's seas and waterways Columbia, South Carolina : University of South Carolina Press, 1988.
