= Lisa Norling =

American historian

Lisa Norling is a U.S. historian noted for her pioneering work on gender and the sea. As such she is part of a new move in maritime historiography to examine gender, race and class in relation to seafaring labor, passengers and people in port cities (i.e. interfaces with the sea).

== Life ==
She graduated from Cornell University, magna cum laude, and from Rutgers University with a Ph.D. She teaches at the University of Minnesota. She also teaches at the Frank C. Munson Institute of American Maritime Studies at Mystic Seaport, and serves as a consultant to the USS Constitution Museum.

She became involved in the Minnesota "Profile of Learning" controversy.

In 1994, she married Steven Ruggles, another historian. She currently lives in Minneapolis with her two children and her husband.

== Awards ==
- 2001 Frederick Jackson Turner Award
- 2000 John Lyman Book Awards for best book in American Maritime History, North American Society for Oceanic History

== Works ==
- Margaret S. Creighton; Lisa Norling, eds. (1996). Iron Men, Wooden Women: Gender and Seafaring in the Atlantic World, 1700-1920. JHU Press. ISBN 978-0-8018-5160-5.
- Captain Ahab Had a Wife: New England Women and the Whalefishery 1740-1870. UNC Press. 2000. ISBN 978-0-8078-4870-8.
