= William S. Dudley =

American naval historian

William Sheldon Dudley (born 14 July 1936 in Brooklyn, New York, USA) is a naval historian of the United States Navy, who served as Director of Naval History and Director, Naval Historical Center, Washington, D.C. from 1995 to 2004.

== Early life and education ==
The son of William Henry Dudley and his wife Dorothy Lawson Dudley, he attended Williams College, where he earned his Bachelor of Arts degree in 1958. After graduation, he joined the United States Naval Reserve serving from 1959 to 1963 in the grades of ensign to lieutenant. On leaving active service, Dudley became a history teacher at Poly Prep Country Day School in Brooklyn, New York, while also earning his Master of Arts degree in history at Columbia University, between 1963 and 1966. Completing his master's degree in 1966 with a thesis on "Pedro de Angelis, 1784-1859: journalist, historian and propagandist", he went on to work on his doctorate, which he completed in 1972 with a dissertation on "Reform and radicalism in the Brazilian Army, 1870-1889". On 21 August 1965, he married Julia Bartel, with whom he had two daughters. After her death, he married Donna Tully on 20 February 2001.

== Academic and government career ==
In 1970, Southern Methodist University appointed him assistant professor of history. He remained there until 1977, when the Naval Historical Center appointed him a supervisory historian. Dudley began work on the series "Naval Documents of the American Revolution," beginning with volume 8, under its editor Dr. William J. Morgan. In 1982, Dudley succeeded Morgan as Head, Early History Branch from 1982–1990, during which period he initiated a similar series for the War of 1812, and then succeeded Morgan again as Senior Historian, 1990-1995. In 1995, the Navy Department selected Dudley for a Senior Executive Service appointment to succeed Dr. Dean C. Allard as Director of Naval History. Dudley held this post until his retirement in December 2004.

Dudley served as president of the American Revolution Roundtable in 1987, president of the Society for History in the Federal Government in 1989-1990, and president of the North American Society for Oceanic History, 1999-2003. He has been elected a corresponding member of the Massachusetts Historical Society, a director of the Annapolis Maritime Museum, and a member of the Maryland Advisory Committee on Archaeology.

== Honors and awards ==
- 1993 Samuel Eliot Morison Award, USS Constitution Museum
- 1997 President's Award, National Trust for Historic Preservation
- 2004 Navy Superior Civilian Service Award, United States Navy
- 2005 Special Recognition Award, Surface Navy Association
- 2005 K. Jack Bauer Award, North American Society for Oceanic History
- 2014 Commodore Dudley W. Knox Naval History Lifetime Achievement Award, Naval Historical Foundation

== Published works ==
- Going south: U.S. Navy officer resignations & dismissals on the eve of the Civil War by William S. Dudley. Washington, D.C.: Naval Historical Foundation, 1981.
- The Naval War of 1812: a documentary history, William S. Dudley, editor, Michael J. Crawford, associate editor; with a foreword by John D.H. Kane, Jr. Washington: Naval Historical Center, Dept. of Navy: For sale by the Supt. of Docs., G.P.O., Volume 1, 1812, 1985; volume 2, 1813, 1992; volume 3, 1814-1815, 2002.
- Ned Myers; or a life before the mast, edited by James Fenimore Cooper (1843); with an introduction and notes by William S. Dudley. Annapolis, MD: Naval Institute Press, 1989.
- The early republic and the sea: essays on the naval and maritime history of the early United States, edited by William S. Dudley and Michael J. Crawford. Washington, D.C.: Brassey's, 2001.
- Maritime Maryland: A History. Baltimore: Johns Hopkins University Press, 2010.
- "'The Naval War of 1812:Seas Lakes and Bays, America's Second War of Independence with Scott Harmon, U.S. Naval Academy, Annapolis, MD 2013*
