= Clark G. Reynolds =

Clark Gilbert Reynolds
- American Historian
- Born: December 11, 1939; Knightstown, California, United States
- Died: December 10, 2005 (aged 65); Pisgah Forest, North Carolina, United States

Dr. Clark Gilbert Reynolds, B.A., M.A. (History), Ph.D. (December 11, 1939 – December 10, 2005) was a historian of naval warfare, with a particular interest in the development of U.S. naval aviation. In addition, he made contributions to the fields of world history, strategic history, and the history of maritime civilizations.

== Biography ==
The eldest of the two sons of William G. and Alma E. (Clark) Reynolds, he was a native of San Gabriel, California and graduated with his Bachelor of Arts from the University of California, Santa Barbara in 1961. Reynolds went on the Duke University, where he earned his Master of Arts degree in history in 1963 and his Ph.D. in 1964 under Professor Theodore Ropp.

Reynolds began his career as an instructor, and later an associate professor, in the Department of English, History, and Government at the U.S. Naval Academy in 1964–1968. From there, he went to the University of Maine, where he served in the Department of History from 1968 to 1976 as Associate, and then full Professor. While at the University of Maine, he and William J. McAndrew conducted seminars in maritime and regional history, and Reynolds became a pivotal figure in helping to organize the North American Society for Oceanic History, serving as that organization's first secretary-treasurer.

From 1976 to 1978, he was Professor, and later head of the Department of Humanities with the rank of captain in the U.S. Merchant Marine at the U.S. Merchant Marine Academy at Kings Point New York.

He served briefly as visiting professor at Mississippi State University in the autumn of 1979, but for most of the decade between 1978 and 1988, he was an independent scholar, working as the part-time curator and historian at the Patriot's Point Naval and Maritime Museum in Charleston, South Carolina. In 1988, he was appointed professor of history and served as chairman of the History Department at the College of Charleston from 1988 to 1993. In 1999, he was appointed Distinguished Professor and served in that capacity until his retirement in 2002, when he was named Distinguished Professor Emeritus.

== Bibliography ==
- Carrier Admiral by J. J. Clark (1893–1971) with Clark G. Reynolds. (1967)
- The Fast Carriers: The Forging of an Air Navy (1968; 1978; 1992; 2014)
- Command of the sea: The History and Strategy of Maritime Empires (1974; 1983)
- The Saga of Smokey Stover by Elisha Terrill Stover (1920–1944) and Clark G. Reynolds (1974)
- Famous American Admirals (1978; 2002)
- The Carrier War (1982)
- The Fighting Lady: The New Yorktown in the Pacific war (1986)
- Global Crossroads and the American Seas edited by Clark G. Reynolds for the International Commission for Maritime History (1988)
- History and the Sea: Essays on Maritime strategies (1989)
- War in the Pacific (1990)
- Admiral John H. Towers: the Struggle for Naval Air Supremacy (1991)
- Navies in History (1998)
- On the Warpath in the Pacific : Admiral Jocko Clark and the Fast Carriers (2005)

Dr. Reynolds also published fifty-seven journal articles in his field and contributed to a number of encyclopedias and biographical dictionaries.

== Awards and honors ==
The American Military Institute awarded Reynolds with its Moncado Prize for articles that appeared in Military History in 1975 and 1988.

Reynolds received the 1992 Samuel Eliot Morison Award for Naval Literature from the Naval Order of the United States, and the Admiral Arthur W. Radford Award for Excellence in Naval Aviation History and Literature from the Naval Aviation Museum Foundation in Pensacola, Florida.

In 1993, the North American Society for Oceanic History (NASOH) awarded him its K. Jack Bauer Award for distinguished service to NASOH and for his lifetime of distinguished contributions to the field of maritime history. In his honor, the Society annually awards the Clark G. Reynolds Student Paper Award to the author of the best paper by a graduate student delivered at the society's annual conference.

== Personal life ==
In 1963, Reynolds married Constance A. Caine of Garden City, New York, a Phi Beta Kappa student in political science at Duke University, with whom he had two sons and a daughter and who served throughout his career as his valued researcher, proof reader, and typist.

A lover of jazz music from the 1920–1940 era, Reynolds often served as a volunteer disk jockey on radio programs broadcast on the Maine Public Broadcasting Network and South Carolina Education Radio.

Dr. Clark G. Reynolds died on December 10, 2005, in Pisgah Forest, North Carolina.

Reynold's uncle had been Admiral Joseph James "Jocko" Clark's Flag Lieutenant, which is partly why he co-authored Admiral Clark's memoirs, and would later write his biography.
