= Naval Historical Foundation =

American historical society (1926–2022)

- Formation: March 23, 1926; 100 years ago
- Founded at: Washington, DC
- Dissolved: December 31, 2022; 3 years ago
- Type: 501(c)(3) nonprofit organization
- Tax ID no.: 53-0196627
- Headquarters: Washington, DC
- Products: Pull Together
- Website: www.navyhistory.org
- Remarks: Merged into United States Naval Institute 31 December 2022

The Naval Historical Foundation was a nonprofit organization founded in 1926 and disbanded in 2022. It had a broad mission to preserve and promote the naval history of the United States by supporting official maritime history programs and institutions, meeting the needs of the public for naval history, and collecting historical items. The foundation was located at the Washington Navy Yard in Washington, D.C.

== History ==
=== Origins ===
After World War I, many Americans took the view that the pre-war naval arms race between the United Kingdom and the German Empire had contributed to the outbreak of the war in 1914. This view led to opposition in the United States to postwar naval spending. After taking office in March 1921, President Warren G. Harding, influenced by pacifist thinking and seeing an opportunity to take advantage of anti-naval sentiment to reduce United States Government spending, invited representatives of the United States, the United Kingdom, the Empire of Japan, France, and the Kingdom of Italy to a naval arms control conference in Washington, D.C. The Washington Naval Conference, held from November 1921 to February 1922, resulted in the Washington Naval Treaty, under which the five countries agreed to a moratorium on the construction of new capital ships and restrictions on the total tonnage of their fleets.

United States Navy sea power advocates reacted to these developments by seeking ways to invigorate American support for a strong navy. Among them was U.S. Navy Captain Dudley W. Knox, who recognized that publicizing American naval history would help to stimulate interest among the American public in fielding a strong navy. Writing in the January 1926 edition of the United States Naval Institute magazine Proceedings, he pointed out that much of the history of the U.S. Navy was hidden in various archives around the United States where most Americans had no access to it. Noting that the Naval Historical Society based in New York City was in decline, Knox called for its replacement with a new organization that would find materials of interest in U.S. naval and maritime history and publicize them.

=== Founding and early years ===
Knox's vision led to the creation of the Naval Historical Foundation. It was incorporated in Washington, D.C., as a non-profit organization in March 1926, listing as its objectives the "collection, acquisition, and preservation … of manuscripts, relics, books, pictures, and all other things and information pertaining to the history and traditions of the United States Navy and Merchant Marine" for educational and literary purposes and "the diffusion of knowledge respecting such history and traditions, either by publication or otherwise." The foundation held its inaugural meeting on March 23, 1926, during which it elected retired U.S. Navy Rear Admiral Austin M. Knight as its first president.

The United States Naval Institute made the first donation to the foundation, a US$1,000 donation which the foundation used to develop a trust fund for its activities. The foundation began searching for items of historical interest such as papers, artifacts, and illustrations. Its membership soon grew to include such notable figures as Vice Admiral William S. Sims, who had served as Commander-in-Chief of U.S. Naval Forces in Europe during World War I, and former Assistant Secretary of the Navy Franklin D. Roosevelt.

In 1932, the foundation initiated a publication program with a publication about the United States Revenue-Marine (renamed the United States Revenue Cutter Service in 1894 and one of the ancestors of the United States Coast Guard) entitled The Early History of the U.S. Revenue Cutter Service (1789-1849).

After the opening of the National Maritime Museum in Greenwich in the United Kingdom in 1937, the Naval Historical Foundation, by then under its second president, retired Vice Admiral William L. Rodgers, petitioned the regents of the Smithsonian Institution for a similar national naval museum on the National Mall in Washington, D.C. The Smithsonian turned the foundation down, but the foundation continued to pursue the concept of the museum. Despite the foundation's close association with President Franklin D. Roosevelt, its dream of a museum on the National Mall never came to fruition thanks to the economic hardships of the Great Depression.

=== 1940s and 1950s ===
Retired Admiral Joseph Strauss succeeded Rodgers as president of the Naval Historical Foundation in 1943 and retired Fleet Admiral Ernest J. King succeeded Strauss in 1946. Aided by the foundation's vice president, retired Fleet Admiral Chester Nimitz, King led a vigorous fund-raising effort to raise capital for a naval museum in Washington, D.C. Although health issues forced King to step down from the presidency in 1949, his successor, retired Fleet Admiral William D. Leahy, completed the fund raising effort. The foundation acquired the carriage house at the Decatur House on the northwest corner of Lafayette Square across from the White House, where on May 18, 1950, it opened a small museum, the Truxtun-Decatur Naval Museum, which operated for the next three decades. Its first exhibit was entitled “Commodore Thomas Truxtun and Stephen Decatur and the Navy of their Times,” and shortly after that naval historian Samuel Eliot Morison gave a talk at the museum on “The Battle of Midway.” Morison's talk was so successful that under Leahy the foundation sponsored a lecture series in the Washington, D.C., area on naval history topics for foundation members and their guests. The Smithsonian Institution later cosponsored the lecture series, which continued until 1967.

When Leahy took office, the foundation's growing manuscript collection was held at a warehouse south of Washington, D.C., in Fort Washington, Maryland. Leahy finalized arrangements with the Library of Congress to hold and provide custodial care for the foundation's manuscripts.

=== 1960s and 1970s ===
Leahy died in 1959, and Dudley W. Knox, long the foundation's secretary, took over as president. Knox initiated a series of seven films on the early history of the U.S. Navy that the foundation designed to educate America's youth about naval history and the relationship of sea power to the national welfare of the United States. The foundation made the seven films — entitled The War of Independence, 1775-1783, Naval War with France and Tripoli, The War of 1812, World Wide Operations in Peace and War (1815-1869), Civil War, Part I, Civil War, Part II, and Navy Decline, the New Navy and War with Spain (1863-1898) — with the assistance and cooperation of the U.S. Navy's Bureau of Naval Personnel and distributed them via the American Film Service. The foundation later added two more films to the series. The nine-film program remained in use into the 1980s and was used widely: In 1977, for example, an estimated 45,000 students in 24 U.S. states saw at least one of the films.

In 1961, toward the end of Knox's presidency, the foundation's members approved and adopted new by-laws that provided for a board of directors and a chairman. Retired Admiral Robert B. Carney became the foundation's first chairman in 1961 and served in that capacity until 1981.

Knox died in 1961, and retired Vice Admiral John F. Shafroth Jr. assumed the presidency. During his tenure the foundation expanded its publication programs. He initiated a spring and fall newsletter to the membership. In 1963, an article on naval history was inserted into the newsletter, and after that it began to cover history topics. The foundation also began to publish a series of monographs devoted to historical subjects too large for the newsletter. Early titles in the series included I Was a Yeoman F in 1967, The Incredible Alaska Overland Rescue in 1968, and The Enlistment, Training, and Organization of Crews for Our Navy Ships in 1972. Over the next three decades, the foundation published nearly three dozen monographs.

Shafroth died in 1967 and retired Vice Admiral Walter S. DeLany became president. During his presidency, the U.S. Navy took action to consolidate many of its history-related entities into the Naval Historical Center, which officially opened in 1975 and later became the Naval History and Heritage Command. DeLany had a passion for the Navy Department Library, which became part of the Naval Historical Center and in recognition of his support for the library its reading room was dedicated in his honor.

In the fall of 1979 the expanded spring and fall newsletter was renamed Pull Together. The foundation continued to publish Pull Together until its dissolution in 2022.

=== 1980s and 1990s ===
In 1980, DeLany hired retired U.S. Navy Captain David A. Long, whose last Navy tour was as Deputy Directory of Naval History at the Naval Historical Center, to serve as the foundation's first executive director, responsible for carrying out daily operational tasks for the organization.

DeLany died in 1980, and a former Chief of Naval Operations (CNO), retired Admiral James L. Holloway III, took over the presidency. Carney retired in 1981, and another former CNO, retired Admiral Arleigh Burke, replaced him as chairman. Under Burke and Holloway, the foundation decided that it could better inform the American public about U.S. Navy history by supporting the Navy Memorial Museum – whose creation Burke had championed as an American equivalent of European naval museums – at the Washington Navy Yard in Washington, D.C., than by continuing to operate the Truxtun-Decatur Naval Museum. Accordingly, the Truxtun-Decatur Naval Museum closed in the early 1980s and the former carriage house that had housed it was converted into a conference center. Its holdings were transferred to the Navy Memorial Museum and the Naval Historical Center. Thereafter, the foundation provided direct support to the Navy Memorial Museum, which eventually was renamed the National Museum of the United States Navy. In 1983, the foundation's Pilot House Gift Shop opened, and a portion of its profits went toward support for the museum. It later was renamed the Navy Museum Store.

In 1977, One Observatory Circle at the United States Naval Observatory in Washington, D.C., which had served as the home of the Chief of Naval Operations, was reassigned for use by the Vice President of the United States. Tingey House at the Washington Navy Yard became the new CNO's home. Under Burke and Holloway, the foundation organized a fund-raising committee to acquire museum-quality furnishings for Tingey House. Over the following decades, the foundation donated nearly US$200,000 for the purchase and repair of furnishings at the house.

In 1985, retired Admiral Jerauld Wright, the foundation's director, began a campaign to restore the birthplace of John Paul Jones at Arbigland in Kirkbean, Scotland, creating a “Friends of John Paul Jones” fund-raising group. The group raised $50,000 for the restoration project and over the ensuing decades urged support for the birthplace as a U.S. naval heritage site.

In 1985, retired Rear Admiral Elliott B. Strauss, the son of Admiral Joseph Strauss, succeeded Burke to become the third chairman of the foundation, presiding over the Board of Directors until 1998. Captain Kenneth Coskey, who had spent over six years as a prisoner of war during the Vietnam War and also had served as Deputy Director of the Naval Historical Center, replaced Long as executive director in 1988.

During the 1990s, the foundation's staff expanded when, using a US$20,000 grant provided by Ambassador William H. G. FitzGerald, it hired graduate student David Winkler to conduct oral history work. Winkler later joined the staff to serve as the foundation's historian.

In 1998, the foundation formally donated the documents maintained for it at the Library of Congress to the United States. The documents are available in the Library's Manuscript Division Reading room.

Holloway replaced the 95-year-old Elliott Strauss as chairman in 1998, and retired Vice Admiral Robert F. Dunn, a former Chief of Naval Aviation and Naval Reserve, replaced Holloway as president. By 1999, another former Deputy Director of Naval History, Captain Charles T. Creekman, took over from Coskey as executive director. Under this leadership group, the foundation used the services of volunteers to expand its oral history program and initiated a "Naval Heritage Speakers" program in which experts on naval history topics addressed audiences around the United States. The foundation also sponsored numerous symposia and conferences on historical topics in partnership with other organizations. The foundation produced the "U.S. Navy Heritage Mini-Series," consisting of short history videos that were incorporated into the U.S. Navy's General Military Training program. The foundation also published two coffee table books. The first, The Navy, a narrative treatment of American naval history first published in 2000 and nicknamed the "White Book," by 2022 had undergone several reprints sold over 400,000 copies, and remained in high demand. The second, U.S. Navy, A Complete History, first published in 2003 and nicknamed the "Gray Book," provided a chronology of U.S. Navy history from its beginnings through the 2003 invasion of Iraq and also sold well.

=== 21st century ===
During the first decade of the 21st century the foundation raised money to complete a Cold War Gallery for the National Museum of the United States Navy in Building 70 at the Washington Navy Yard. Several galleries were completed before the foundation ended its fundraising campaign following the Washington Navy Yard shooting in September 2013, which resulted in limited public access to the museum due to security changes at the navy yard.

In 2008, Holloway left the presidency, serving thereafter as chairman emeritus until he died in September 2019. Retired Admiral Bruce DeMars succeeded Holloway as president and then chairman of the foundation, serving in these capacities for a combined 28 years. Under DeMars, the foundation created the Commodore Dudley W. Knox Naval History Lifetime Achievement Award, presented to historians who contributed outstanding naval historical scholarship, mentorship for future historians, and leadership in the field of naval history and heritage, as well as the Vice Admiral Dunn NROTC Essay Contest for midshipmen taking part in Naval Reserve Officers Training Corps programs at American universities. The foundation also increased its electronic outreach efforts by publishing Naval History Book Reviews, supporting the International Journal of Naval History, issuing a weekly "Thursday's Tidings" e-letter featuring naval history relevant to current events, and holding "Second Saturday" monthly webinars.

After DeMars retired to a chairman emeritus role, retired Admiral William J. Fallon became chairman. Under Fallon, the foundation hosted a symposium in late 2018 to conduct a historical retrospective of the interdependence of the civilian nuclear power industry and the U.S. Navy's nuclear reactor program. The symposium highlighted the decline of U.S. nuclear power industry in recent decades.

=== Dissolution ===
When the COVID-19 pandemic struck the United States in 2020, it became impossible for the Naval Historical Foundation to host events at the National Museum of the United States Navy, with a severe impact on the foundation's financial viability. Declining revenue forced Fallon to approach the United States Naval Institute early in 2022 to discuss a merger. Months of negotiations ensued, and in mid-November 2022 the foundation's leadership presented its membership with a merger proposal and asked it to approve of the merger in a vote on December 7, 2022. Vigorous opposition to the merger proposal existed among the members, but ultimately the membership voted in favor of the merger. Under the terms of the merger agreement, the Naval Historical Foundation was dissolved on December 31, 2022.

== Legacy ==
=== United States Naval Institute ===
In January 2023, the United States Naval Institute announced that it intended to perpetuate the Naval Historical Foundation's legacy and mission as part of its own future activities. It assumed stewardship of several Naval Historical Foundation naval history programs and activities and planned to "enhance the depth and breadth of its history offerings, providing greater visibility and stature to the subject." It also assumed the responsibility for awarding the annual Knox Medal.

Under the merger agreement, all Naval Historical Foundation members became U.S. Naval Institute members, and the U.S. Naval Institute agreed to fulfill their memberships under its own auspices. As U.S. Naval Institute members, former Naval Historical Foundation members who subscribed to Pull Together began to receive Naval History magazine instead.

The U.S. Naval Institute also kept the Naval Historical Foundation website active, and announced that it "will remain so until further notice." Keeping the website active allowed readers to maintain access to past issues of Pull Together and "Thursday Tidings", as well as to other content such as the Naval History Book Reviews.

=== National Maritime Historical Society ===
The National Maritime Historical Society also carried on aspects of the Naval Historical Foundation's legacy. In the aftermath of the foundation's dissolution, the society continued "Thursday Tidings" as a weekly newsletter, renaming it "Tuesday Tidings." "Tuesday Tidings" also hosts new issues of the International Journal of Naval History.

== Activities ==
=== Knox Medal ===
In 2013, the Naval Historical Foundation established the Commodore Dudley W. Knox Naval History Lifetime Achievement Award, often referred to as the Knox Medal, to honor the memory of the naval historian Commodore Dudley W. Knox and to recognize the lifetime achievements of historians of the United States Navy. The foundation awarded the Knox Medal annually from 2013 through 2017 and from 2019 through 2022. After the foundation's dissolution at the end of 2022, the United States Naval Institute assumed the responsibility for awarding the Knox Medal.

==== Knox Medal recipients, 2013–2022 ====
- 2013 — James C. Bradford, William N. Still, Jr., Philip K. Lundeberg
- 2014 — John Hattendorf, Craig L. Symonds, William S. Dudley, Harold D. Langley.
- 2015 — Dean C. Allard, Thomas J. Cutler, Kenneth J. Hagan
- 2016 — Christopher McKee
- 2017 — Jon Sumida, Paul Stillwell, Edward Marolda
- 2018 — No award.
- 2019 — Tyrone G. Martin, Norman Polmar, David Curtis Skaggs, Jr.
- 2020 — Michael J. Crawford, Peter M. Swartz
- 2021 — Kathleen Broome Williams, Robert M. Browning Jr., Thomas C. Hone
- 2022 — Norman Friedman, Donald F. Bittner

=== Pull Together ===
Pull Together, first published in the fall of 1979, was the official newsletter of the Naval Historical Foundation. Its name was taken from the Queenstown Association, a veterans group who served in Ireland with the U.S. Navy or the Royal Navy during World War I. Articles covered all aspects of American naval history, including narrative and eyewitness accounts of naval battles and operations, biographical studies, announcements of upcoming events, and book notices and reviews. The editorial staff welcomed article submissions.

== Officers ==
=== Naval Historical Foundation directors in 2022 ===
- Chairman: Admiral William J. Fallon, USN (Ret.)
- Executive Director: Rear Admiral Edward Masso, USN (Ret.)
- Mr. Matthew P. Bergman
- Mr. Martin Bollinger
- The Honorable Kenneth J. Braithwaite, II
- Vice Admiral Walter E. Carter, Jr., USN (Ret.)
- Dr. Kate C. Epstein
- Admiral James G. Foggo III, USN (Ret.)
- Rear Admiral Vincent L. Griffith, USN (Ret.)
- Rear Admiral Sinclair Harris, USN (Ret.)
- Dr. Henry J. Hendrix II, Capt., USN (Ret.)
- The Honorable Steven S. Honigman
- Mr. James D. Hornfischer
- Mr. Roger A. Krone
- The Honorable John F. Lehman, Jr.
- Rear Admiral Larry R. Marsh, USN (Ret.)
- Captain James A. Noone, USNR (Ret.)
- Vice Admiral Frank C. Pandolfe, USN (Ret.)
- The Honorable BJ Penn
- Dr. David A. Rosenberg, CAPT, USN (Ret.)
- Mr. Michael J. Wallace

=== Presidents ===
- Admiral Austin M. Knight, USN (Ret.) 1926–1927
- Vice Admiral William L. Rodgers, USN (Ret.) 1927–1943
- Admiral Joseph Strauss, USN (Ret.) 1943–1946
- Fleet Admiral Ernest J. King, USN (Ret.) 1946–1949
- Fleet Admiral William D. Leahy, USN (Ret.) 1949–1959
- Commodore Dudley W. Knox, USN (Ret.) 1959–1961
- Vice Admiral John F. Shafroth Jr., USN (Ret.) 1961–1967
- Vice Admiral Walter S. DeLany, USN (Ret.) 1967–1980
- Admiral James L. Holloway III, USN (Ret.) 1980–1998
- Vice Admiral Robert F. Dunn, USN (Ret.) 1998–2012
- Rear Admiral John T. Mitchell, Jr., USN (Ret.) 2012–2016
- Rear Admiral (lower half) Arthur N. Langston, III, USN (Ret.) 2016–2019
- Vice Admiral Frank C. Pandolfe, USN (Ret.) 2019–2022

=== Chairmen ===
- Admiral Robert B. Carney, USN (Ret.) 1961–1981
- Admiral Arleigh A. Burke, USN (Ret.) 1981–1985
- Rear Admiral Elliott B. Strauss, USN (Ret.) 1985–1998
- Admiral James L. Holloway III, USN (Ret.) 1998–2008
- Admiral Bruce DeMars, USN (Ret.) 2008–2015
- Admiral William J. Fallon, (Ret.) 2015–2022

== See also ==
- List of history awards
