= Steven Ruggles =

American historical demographer (born 1955)

- Born: May 8, 1955 (age 71); New Haven, Connecticut, U.S.
- Education: University of Wisconsin (BA); University of Pennsylvania (MA, Ph.D.)
- Known for: IPUMS
- Scientific career
- Fields: Historical demography
- Workplaces: Institute for Social Research and Data Innovation, University of Minnesota

Steven Ruggles (born May 8, 1955) is Regents Professor of History and Population Studies at the University of Minnesota, and the director of the IPUMS Center for Data Integration. He received a 2022 MacArthur "Genius" award.

Ruggles is best known as the creator of IPUMS, the world's largest population database. IPUMS provides information about two billion people residing in 159 countries between 1703 and the present, including every respondent to the surviving U.S. censuses of 1790 to 1950. He served as founding director of the Minnesota Population Center from 2000 to 2016 and the Institute for Social Research and Data Innovation from 2016 to 2023. He served as the 2015 President of the Population Association of America, the first historian to hold the position. He also served as President of the Association of Population Centers (2017–2018) and President of the Social Science History Association (2018–2019). He has been active on many national advisory and study committees, including the Census Bureau Scientific Advisory Committee; the National Science Foundation Social, Behavioral, and Economic Sciences Advisory Committee; the National Science Foundation Advisory Committee for CyberInfrastructure; and the National Academy of Sciences Board on Research Data and Information.

Ruggles completed a BA at the University of Wisconsin–Madison (1978), followed by at the University of Pennsylvania an MA (1982) and PhD (historical demography, 1984). He has published extensively on historical demography, focusing especially on long-run changes in multi-generational families, single parenthood, divorce, and marriage, and data and methods for population history. His study of the effects of demographic change on family structure won the William J. Goode Book Award from the American Sociological Association and the Allen Sharlin Memorial Award from the Social Science History Association. Ruggles's work on migration censoring in family reconstitution stimulated a debate about biases introduced by the "Ruggles Effect." Ruggles was also a prominent contributor to the debate about disclosure control in the 2020 U.S. Census.

Ruggles received a 2003 Robert J. Lapham Award from the Population Association of America in recognition of lifetime contributions that blend research with the application of demographic knowledge to policy issues, and in 2009 he received the Warren E. Miller Award from the Inter-university Consortium for Political and Social Research for meritorious service to the social sciences. In 1995, Ruggles was described as the "King of Quant" by Wired Magazine, and in 2014, he was named “Wonkblog-Certified Data Wizard” by the Washington Post Wonkblog, which noted that "losing to Steven Ruggles in Name That Data is kind of like losing to Adele on American Idol."

In 1994, Ruggles married Lisa Norling, another historian. They have two daughters.

== Selected publications ==
- Steven Ruggles. 2026. The Pig in the Python: U.S. Labor Flows and Economic Opportunity, 1910-2040. Proceedings of the National Academy of Sciences, 123(20): e2601716123.
- Steven Ruggles. 2025. The Shortcomings of Synthetic Census Microdata for Social Science Research. Proceedings of the National Academy of Sciences, 122(11): e2424655122.
- Steven Ruggles. 2024. When Privacy Protection Goes Wrong: How and Why the 2020 Census Confidentiality Program Failed. Journal of Economic Perspectives 38(2) 201-226
- Steven Ruggles and Diana Magnuson. 2023. 'It’s none of their damn business': Privacy and Disclosure Control in the U.S. Census, 1790-2020. Population and Development Review 49(3): 651-679
- Steven Ruggles. 2021. The Revival of Quantification: Reflections on Old New Histories. Social Science History. 45: 1-25.
- Ruggles, Steven and Diana L. Magnuson. Census Technology, Politics, and Institutional Change, 1790–2020. Journal of American History vol. 107 (2020), pp. 19-51
- Ruggles, Steven. Patriarchy, Power, and Pay: The Transformation of American Families, 1800–2015. Demography, vol. 52 (2015), pp. 1797-1823
- Ruggles, Steven. Big Microdata for Population Research. Demography, vol. 51 (2014), pp. 287-297
- Kennedy, Sheela and Steven Ruggles. Breaking up is Hard to Count: The Rise of Divorce in the United States, 1980–2010.Demography, vol. 51 (2014), pp. 587–598
- Ruggles, Steven. Reconsidering the Northwest European Family System. Population and Development Review, vol. 35 (2009), pp. 321–332
- Ruggles, Steven. The Decline of Intergenerational Coresidence in the United States, 1850 to 2000. American Sociological Review, vol. 72 (2007), pp. 962–989
- Patricia Kelly Hall and Steven Ruggles. 'Restless in the Midst of Their Prosperity': New Evidence on the Internal Migration of Americans, 1850–2000. Journal of American History, vol. 91 (2004), pp. 829–846
- Ruggles, Steven. The Rise of Divorce and Separation in the United States, 1880–1990. Demography, vol. 34 (1997), pp. 962–989
- Ruggles, Steven. The Transformation of American Family Structure. American Historical Review, vol. 99 (1994), pp. 103–128
- Ruggles, Steven. The Origins of African-American Family Structure. American Sociological Review, vol. 59 (1994), pp. 136–151
- Ruggles, Steven. Migration, Marriage, and Mortality: Correcting Sources of Bias in English Family Reconstitutions. Population Studies, vol. 46 (1992), pp. 507–522
- Ruggles, Steven (1987). Prolonged Connections: The Rise of the Extended Family in Nineteenth-Century England and America. Madison: University of Wisconsin Press. pp. xx, 282. ISBN 0-299-11030-3.
