= The Northern Mariner =

- Discipline: Maritime history
- Language: English, French

Publication details
- Publisher: Canadian Nautical Research Society/North American Society for Oceanic History
- Frequency: Quarterly

Standard abbreviations
- ISO 4: North. Mar.

Indexing
- ISSN: 1183-112X

Links
- Journal homepage

The Northern Mariner (French: Le marin du nord) is a quarterly peer-reviewed academic journal published by the Canadian Nautical Research Society in association with the North American Society for Oceanic History. It covers the study of maritime affairs and the inland waterways of the nations that touch the seas of the northern hemisphere. While the emphasis is on historical essays, the journal publishes articles and research notes which reflect other approaches. Topics of interest include ships, shipbuilding, ship owning, technology, merchant shipping, trade, labour, maritime communities, ports, naval history, fishing, whaling, sealing, underwater archaeology, and maritime biography. The journal also includes book reviews.

As of 1/1/2026, the 'current issue' available at Canadian Nautical Research Society is Volume XXXIV - 2024, #1.

Vol. 35 No. 1 (2025) is available online at York University, Canada: https://tnm.journals.yorku.ca/index.php/default As of 1/1/2026, York U lists that as the "current issue"
