= USS Constitution Museum =

Museum in Boston, Massachusetts, US

Coordinates: 42°22′26″N 71°3′19″W

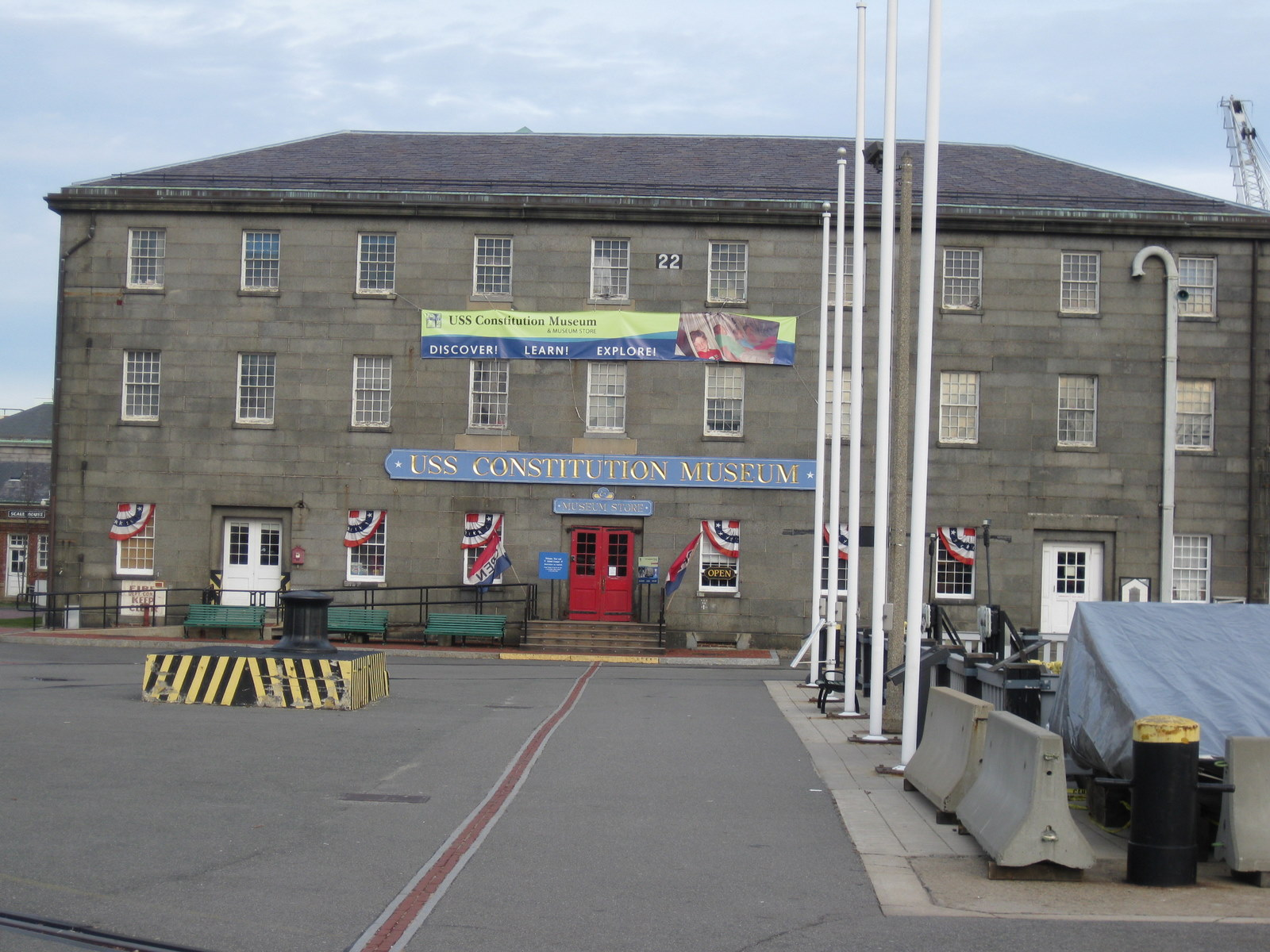
- Established: 1972
- Location: Boston Navy Yard; Building 22; Charlestown, Boston, Massachusetts 02129
- President: Anne Grimes Rand
- Website: ussconstitutionmuseum.org

The USS Constitution Museum is located in the Charlestown Navy Yard, which is part of the Boston National Historical Park in Boston, Massachusetts, United States. The museum is situated near the ship USS Constitution at the end of Boston's Freedom Trail. The museum is housed in a restored shipyard building at the foot of Pier 2.

The museum, through its collections and interactive exhibits, tells the story of Constitution ("Old Ironsides") and the people who designed, built, and sailed her. The museum is also home to the Samuel Eliot Morison Memorial Library and includes a comprehensive archival repository of records related to the ship's history. The USS Constitution Museum is a private, non-profit organization that is managed separately from the naval ship.

== Exhibits ==
- All Hands On Deck – An all-ages interactive exhibit that explores the realities of life at sea during the War of 1812
- Old Ironsides in War and Peace – A in-depth look at the ship's storied history, including how and why she was built, how she earned her fame during the War of 1812, and why she is preserved at the United States Navy's oldest commissioned warship
- "Old Ironsides" War of 1812 Discovery Center – An interactive exhibit that explains the causes and consequences of the War of 1812 through games, multi-media, books, and other hands-on activities
- Constitution vs HMS Java – The story of the battle between Constitution and HMS Java, told through artwork, archival records, and artifacts associated with the battle

== USS Constitution Awards Program ==
The Board of Directors of the Museum makes three major awards annually:

=== The Samuel Eliot Morison Award ===
The Samuel Eliot Morison Award is the highest recognition by the Board of a Trustees of the USS Constitution Museum Foundation of a person whose public service has enhanced the image of Constitution and who reflects the best of Rear Admiral Samuel Eliot Morison: artful scholarship, patriotic pride, and eclectic interest in the sea and things maritime, and a desire to preserve the best of our past for future generations.

- 1977 Henry Cabot Lodge Jr.
- 1978 John W. McCormack
- 1979 Leverett Saltonstall
- 1980 Arleigh Burke
- 1981 Joseph C. Wylie
- 1982 Richard E. Rumble
- 1983 John D. H. Kane
- 1984 Grace Hopper
- 1985 Thomas P. O'Neill Jr.
- 1986 Dodge Morgan
- 1987 Edward L. Beach Jr.
- 1988 Joseph Z. Brown
- 1989 Tyrone G. Martin
- 1990 William M. Fowler Jr.
- 1991 W. Davis Taylor
- 1992 William S. Dudley
- 1993 Christopher McKee
- 1994 Benjamin W. Labaree
- 1995 Leon F. Kaufman
- 1996 Dean C. Allard
- 1997 John A. Roach
- 1998 Anne Grimes Rand
- 1999 Michael C. Beck
- 2001 Harold D. Langley
- 2002 Patrick O'Brian (posthumously)
- 2004 Walter Cronkite
- 2005 Nathaniel Philbrick
- 2006 Ira Dye (posthumously)
- 2007 David McCullough
- 2008 Charles E. Brodine Jr.; Michael J. Crawford; and Christine F. Hughes.
- 2009 John B. Hattendorf
- 2010 William H. White
- 2011 Bernard Bailyn
- 2012 David Curtis Skaggs Jr.
- 2013 Donald R. Hickey
- 2014 George C. Daughan
- 2015 William Martin
- 2016 W. Jeffrey Bolster
- 2017 Lisa Norling
- 2018 James D. Hornfischer
- 2019 Ian W. Toll

=== The Charles Francis Adams Award ===
Named and modeled after museum founder Charles Francis Adams IV, the award is bestowed upon individuals who have created positive change through works of lifelong community service.

- 1991 Jason A. Aisner (posthumously)
- 1992 Caleb Loring Jr.
- 1993 John Joseph Moakley
- 1994 Mrs. George L (Hessie) Sargent
- 1995 J. Welles Henderson
- 1997 Harvey Chet Krentzman
- 1998 John J. Schiff (posthumously)
- 1999 Claire V. Bloom
- 2001 Edward M. Kennedy
- 2002 Vivien Li
- 2004 Gordon Abbott Jr.
- 2005 Gordon R. England
- 2006 Thomas J. Hudner Jr.
- 2007 James (Lou) Gorman
- 2008 Kevin C. Phelan
- 2009 Thomas M. Menino
- 2010 John P. Hamill
- 2011 Robert M. Mahoney
- 2012 Robert L. Reynolds
- 2013 Peter H. Smyth
- 2014 Thomas A. Kershaw
- 2015 James T. Brett
- 2016 David H. Long
- 2017 Thomas A. Kennedy
- 2018 Niki Tsongas
- 2019 Charlie Baker

=== The Don Turner Award ===
To honor Don Turner, former head of the USS Constitution Maintenance and Repair Facility, for his singular contribution toward the preservation of "Old Ironsides" and the skills that built her, as well as his knowledge of and dedication to the ancient art of shipbuilding, and to recognize others who are similarly dedicated to maritime preservation and advances in ship construction and design, the Don Turner Award is made annually to a person or team of people, professional or amateur, who have contributed significantly to efforts to preserve important vessels or who have made significant contributions to our knowledge and understanding of ship design and construction.

- 1991 Don Turner
- 1992 Maynard Bray
- 1993 Harvey Steinberg
- 1994 Bill Kock
- 1995 Charlie Deans
- 1996 Patrick Otton
- 1997 Robert J. Burbank and the Riggers of USS Constitution
- 1998 Howard Chatterton
- 2001 Dana Hewson
- 2002 Robert Neyland
- 2004 Olin Stephens
- 2005 Dana Wegner
- 2006 Walter Rybka
- 2008 Quentin Snedeker
- 2009 Don Birkholz Jr.
- 2010 Richard Whelan
- 2011 Elizabeth Meyer
- 2012 Peter M. Stanford
- 2013 Harold Burnham, Ralph W. Stanley
- 2014 Nathaniel S. Wilson, Charles W. Morgan restoration team
- 2015 Maine Windjammer Fleet, Captains Doug and Linda Lee; Captain John Foss
- 2016 Meghan Wren Briggs
- 2017 Naval History & Heritage Command Detachment Boston
- 2018 National WWII Museum PT-305 Restoration Team
- 2019 Schooner Ernestina-Morrissey Association

== See also ==
The museum in 2019

- National Museum of the United States Navy § Other Navy museums
- List of maritime museums in the United States
