= Canadian Nautical Research Society =

Canadian organization

The Canadian Nautical Research Society (CNRS; French: Société canadienne pour la recherche nautique, SCRN) was originally established as the Canadian Society for the Promotion of Nautical Research, then incorporated 25 October 1984 under its current name and achieved the status of a registered charity shortly thereafter.

The objectives of the Society are:

- to promote nautical research in Canada,
- to disseminate the results of such research, and
- to encourage an awareness of Canada's maritime heritage

To those ends, the Society publishes in association with the North American Society for Oceanic History a quarterly journal The Northern Mariner/Le marin du nord and a quarterly newsletter Argonauta; holds an annual conference; and makes several awards:

- the Jacques Cartier MA Prize in Maritime Affairs, to encourage graduate students at the Master's level,
- the Gerry Panting Award, which is a bursary to a young scholar to attend the annual conference to present a paper, and
- the Keith Matthews Awards, named in honour of the Society's first President, to recognize outstanding publications in the field of nautical research.

The Society is also the Canadian national sub-commission of the International Commission for Maritime History.
