= Briton C. Busch =

American historian

Briton Cooper Busch
- Born: September 5, 1936; Los Angeles, California, U.S.
- Died: May 10, 2004 (aged 67); Hamilton, New York, U.S.

Academic background
- Education: Stanford University; University of California, Berkeley

Academic work
- Discipline: Military history
- Institutions: Colgate University

Briton Cooper Busch (5 September 1936, in Los Angeles, California – 10 May 2004, in Hamilton, New York) was a specialist in nineteenth century British diplomatic history, military history, and American maritime history at Colgate University.

== Early life and education ==
The son of Niven Busch and his wife, Phyllis Cooper Busch, Briton—familiarly known as "Tony" Busch—attended Stanford University, where he earned his Bachelor of Arts degree in 1958. From Stanford, he went on to the University of California, Berkeley, where he completed his Master of Arts degree in 1960 with a thesis on "Muscat and Oman: Anglo-French conflict, 1894-1914' and his Ph.D. in 1965 with a dissertation on "British policy in the Persian Gulf, 1894-1914." He married Deborah B. Stone on 16 August 1958, with whom he had two children. After their divorce in 1984, he married Jill Harsin in 1985.

== Academic career ==
Busch spent his entire academic career in the History Department at Colgate University, where he became an instructor in 1963, an assistant professor in 1965, associate professor in 1968, and full professor in 1973. In 1978, he was given an academic chair as the William R. Kenan, Junior, Professor of History. He served as chairman, History Department, 1980–1985, and then Director, Social Sciences Division, 1985–1991. He was appointed William R. Kenan, Junior, professor emeritus in 2003.

He was a Woodrow Wilson Fellow in 1963, a National Endowment for the Humanities fellow in 1967–68, and a Social Science Research Council fellow in 1968–69.

For more than a decade, he was a leading figure in the field of maritime history in the United States, particularly with the North American Society for Oceanic History, where he served as a member of the executive council in 1983–1988; chairman of the book awards committee from 1987 to 1992; vice president 1991–92; and president, 1991–1992 and 1995–1998. In addition, he was a member of council of the International Commission for Maritime History, 1996 to 2000, and served as Book Review editor of the country's leading scholarly journal for maritime history in the United States, The American Neptune, from 1991 to 2003.

He was a member of the Society for Military History and served as a member of the book prize committee from 1996 to 1998, and was its chairman from 1998 to 2000. Additionally, he was a member of the American Historical Association, the Royal Society for Asian Affairs, Middle East Studies Association, the Western Front Association.

== Published works ==
- Britain and the Persian Gulf, 1894-1914, Berkeley, University of California Press, 1967.
- Britain, India, and the Arabs, 1914-1921, Berkeley, University of California Press, 1971.
- Mudros to Lausanne : Britain's frontier in West Asia, 1918-1923, Albany : State University of New York Press, 1976.
- Hardinge of Penshurst: a study of the old diplomacy, Hamden, Conn.: Published for the Conference on British Studies and Indiana University at South Bend by Archon Books, 1980.
- Master of Desolation: the reminiscences of Capt. Joseph J. Fuller, edited, with introd. and notes by Briton Cooper Busch. Mystic, Conn. : Mystic Seaport Museum, 1980.
- Alta California 1840-1842: the journal and observations of William Dane Phelps, master of the ship "Alert", introduced and edited by Briton Cooper Busch. Glendale, Calif. : A.H. Clark Co., 1983.
- The war against the seals: a history of the North American seal fishery, Kingston [Ont.] : McGill-Queen's University Press; Gloucester [Gloucestershire] : A. Sutton, 1985.
- Frémont's private Navy: the 1846 journal of captain William Dane Phelps, edited with introduction by Briton Cooper Busch. Glendale, Calif. : A.H. Clark Co., 1987.
- Whaling will never do for me: the American whaleman in the nineteenth century, Lexington, Ky. : University Press of Kentucky, 1994.
- Fur traders from New England: the Boston men in the North Pacific, 1787-1800: the narratives of William Dane Phelps, William Sturgis, and James Gilchrist Swan edited, with notes and introduction by Briton C. Busch and Barry M. Gough. Spokane, Wash.: Arthur H. Clark Co., 1997.
- Canada and the Great War: Western Front Association papers, edited by Briton C. Busch. Montreal; Ithaca : McGill-Queen's University Press, 2003.
- Bunker Hill to Bastogne: elite forces and American society, Washington, D.C.: Potomac Books, 2006. ISBN 1-574-88776-9 OCLC 148714959

== Sources ==
- Marquis Who's Who
- Colgate University Library
