= Tyrone G. Martin =

American navy officer, historian and author (1930–2026)

Tyrone Gabriel Martin
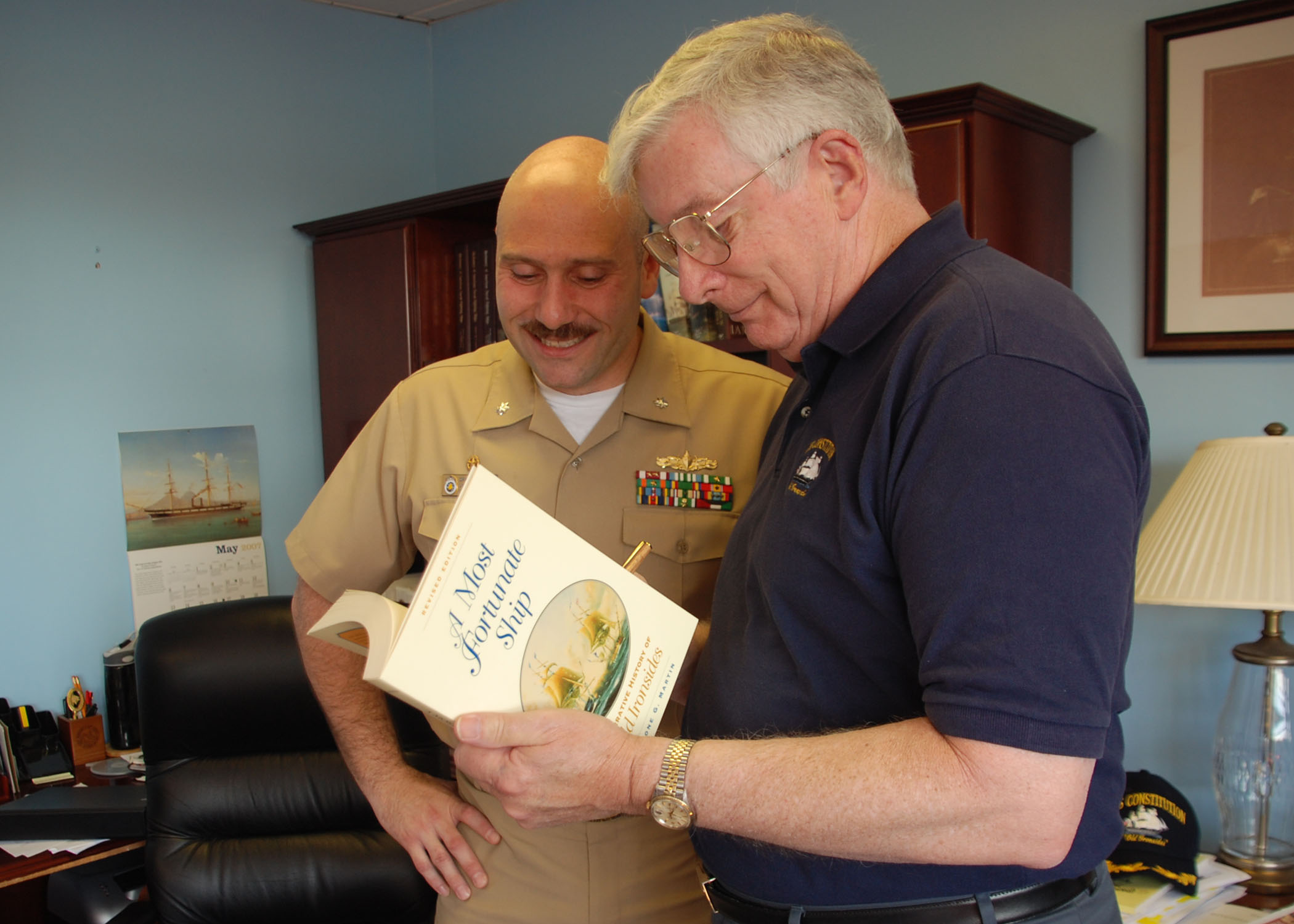
- Martin (right) with Commander William A. Bullard III in 2007
- Born: June 5, 1930; Greenwich, Connecticut, U.S.
- Died: February 16, 2026 (aged 95); Tryon, North Carolina, U.S.
- Military career
- Allegiance: United States
- Branch: United States Navy
- Service years: 26
- Rank: Commander
- Nickname: Ty
- Commands: USS Constitution
- Other work: Author and Historian

Tyrone Gabriel Martin (June 5, 1930 – February 26, 2026) was a United States Navy commander, naval historian, most notable as an authority on USS Constitution ("Old Ironsides"), of which he was the 58th commanding officer. Martin was born in Greenwich, Connecticut on 5 June 1930 and commissioned an officer through the NROTC in 1952. During his twenty-three years of navy service, he commanded two destroyers on tours of duty off Korea and Vietnam finally becoming the commanding officer (captain) of Constitution on 6 August 1974. In July 1976, during the United States Bicentennial celebrations, Queen Elizabeth II of the United Kingdom and her husband Prince Philip, Duke of Edinburgh, arrived for their state visit and privately toured the ship for approximately thirty minutes with Commander Martin and Secretary of the Navy J. William Middendorf. During the 1980s, he was a Senior Naval Science Instructor (SNSI) for the NJROTC program at Boston Technical High School.

During Martin's tenure as Commanding Officer, several traditions were instituted that are still observed by the crew of Constitution, such as the wearing of 1812 era uniforms and the practice of firing morning and sunset guns. Constitution received her first Meritorious Unit Commendation during his tour, and Martin was the first captain to be decorated for service since Charles Stewart. Martin turned over command of the ship to Commander Robert Leo Gillen on 30 June 1978. He retiredin 1978. After his time in the navy, Martin retired to Tryon, NC where he wrote several books about "Old Ironsides" and numerous articles on various aspects of the ship and her times, plus the "Salty Talk" column in the journal Naval History.

In 2019, the Naval Historical Foundation awarded Martin the Commodore Dudley W. Knox Naval History Lifetime Achievement Award.

Martin died in Tryon, North Carolina on February 26, 2026, at the age of 95.

== Works ==
- A Most Fortunate Ship: A Narrative History of "Old Ironsides". Naval Institute Press. 1997. ISBN 1-55750-588-8. OCLC 243901224.
- Undefeated: Old Ironsides in the War of 1812. Chapel Hill: Tryon Publishing Company. 1996. ISBN 1-884824-19-6. OCLC 36330743.
- Creating a Legend. Chapel Hill: Tryon Publishing Company. 1997. ISBN 1-884824-20-X. OCLC 37713196.
- Humphreys, Assheton Y. (2000). Tyrone G. Martin (ed.). The USS Constitution's Finest Fight: The Journal of Acting Chaplain Assheton Humphreys, US Navy. The Nautical & Aviation Publishing. ISBN 1-877853-60-7. OCLC 44632941.
- John Charles Roach (2003). A Signal Honor: The Men of Constitution. Chapel Hill: Tryon Publishing Company. ISBN 1-884824-31-5. OCLC 62156072.
- The USS Constitution: A Design Confirmed. Salem Massachusetts: Peabody Museum of Salem. 1997. OCLC 88264025.
- Eriksen, Olof A. (2009). Tyrone G. Martin (ed.). Constitution: All Sails Up and Flying. Outskirts Press. ISBN 978-1-4327-3160-1.
