= Dean C. Allard =

American naval historian and archivist (1933–2018)

- Born: Dean Conrad Allard, Jr. October 19, 1933; Kansas City, Missouri, U.S.
- Died: September 27, 2018 (aged 84)
- Education: Dartmouth College (AB); Georgetown University (MA); George Washington University (PhD)
- Spouse: Constance Lynne Morgan
- Scientific career
- Workplaces: Naval History and Heritage Command

Dr. Dean Conrad Allard, Jr. (October 19, 1933 – September 27, 2018) was a naval historian and archivist. He served as the Director of Naval History and the United States Navy's Naval Historical Center from 1989 to 1995.

== Early life and education ==
The son of Dean Conrad Allard, Sr., and his wife Elizabeth Donaldson Graves, Allard attended the Pembroke Country-Day School in Kansas City and then went on to Dartmouth College, where he earned his A.B. degree in 1955 and was elected to Phi Beta Kappa. He married Constance Lynne Morgan on June 17, 1955, with whom he had four children.

After serving in the United States Navy from 1955 to 1958, he returned to graduate school in history at Georgetown University, where he earned his M.A. degree in 1959 with a thesis on "The Influence of the United States Navy upon the American Steel Industry, 1880-1900." He completed his Ph.D. at the George Washington University in 1967 under Professor Wood Gray with a dissertation on "Spencer Fullerton Baird and the U.S. Fish Commission: a Study in the History of American Science."

== Career ==
Upon leaving active service in the Navy, Allard was appointed head of the U.S. Navy's Operational Archives in 1958 and served in that position until 1982, when he became senior historian. In 1989, he was appointed Director of Naval History and served in that capacity until his retirement in 1995.

Allard served as an adjunct professor of history at George Washington University from 1979 to 1989. In addition, he served as President of the Arlington Historical Society from 1974 to 1975; member of the council of Woodlawn Plantation in Fairfax, Virginia, from 1976 to 1984; chairman of the Historical Commission of Arlington, Virginia, from 1978 to 1980; and member of the French-U.S. Scientific Committee on the CSS Alabama from 1991 to 1995.

He served as vice president of the International Commission for Military History from 2000 to 2005; a member of the executive council of the International Commission for Maritime History from 1990 to 2002; president of the U.S. Commission for Military History from 1995 to 1999; vice president of the Society for Military History from 1983 to 1986; and President of the North American Society for Oceanic History from 1985 to 1989. He was a member of the Cosmos Club in Washington, D.C.

== Awards and honors ==
- 1992 K. Jack Bauer Award of the North American Society for Oceanic History
- 1995 Samuel Eliot Morison Award of the USS Constitution Museum
- 1995 Navy Superior Civilian Service Award
- 2015 Commodore Dudley W. Knox Naval History Lifetime Achievement Award of the Naval Historical Foundation

== Publications ==
- U.S. Naval History Sources in the Washington Area and Suggested Research Subjects, compiled by Dean C. Allard and Betty Bern. Washington; U.S. Govt. Print. Off. 1970.
- The United States Navy and the Vietnam Conflict: The Setting of the Stage to 1959 , vol. 1. by Edwin B. Hooper, Dean C. Allard, and Oscar P. Fitzgerald. Washington; U.S. Govt. Print. Off., 1976.
- Spencer Fullerton Baird and the U.S. Fish Commission. New York: Arno Press, 1978.
- U.S. Naval History Sources in the United States, compiled and edited by Dean C. Allard, Martha L. Crawley, and Mary W. Edmison. Washington; U.S. Govt. Print. Off. 1979.

== Sources ==
- Marquis Who's Who: "Dean C. Allard"
