= James C. Bradford =

American historian

- Born: James Chapin Bradford; 1945 (age 80–81); Detroit, Michigan, U.S.
- Education: Michigan State University (BA, MA); University of Virginia (PhD)
- Occupations: Historian; professor

James Chapin Bradford (born April 7, 1945 in Detroit, Michigan—died August 10, 2024 in Bryan, Texas) was an American professor of history at Texas A&M University and a specialist in American maritime, naval, and military history in the early national period of American History.

== Family, Early life, and Education ==
The son of Raymond Frederick Bradford and Eleanor Ritter Bradford, he was raised in Bear Lake, Michigan and Traverse City, Michigan. He attended Traverse City Central High School, then earned his B.A. in 1967 and M.A. in 1968 at Michigan State University, then went on to the University of Virginia, where he earned his Ph.D. in history in 1976 with a thesis on Society and government in Loudoun County, Virginia, 1790–1800.

== Academic career ==
Before completing his doctorate, Bradford began his academic career by working as a research assistant at the Thomas Jefferson Memorial Foundation in 1972–74, where he assisted in editing Thomas Jefferson's account books. In 1973, he was appointed assistant professor in history at the United States Naval Academy. He remained at the Naval Academy until 1981, when Texas A&M University appointed him to its history faculty.

Bradford has also taught at the University of Maryland in 1974–81; MARA Institute of Technology/Texas International Education Consortium in Malaysia in 1987–88, the Air War College in 1997–98, and the University of Alabama in 1996–97. In addition, Bradford has led numerous study abroad programs in the British Isles, Italy, France, and Germany.

Active in a number of professional organizations, he served as executive director of the Society for Historians of the Early American Republic, 1996–2004, and was elected president of the North American Society for Oceanic History to serve from 2008-2012. He has served in a wide variety of editorial and advisory roles, including being Book Review editor of the Journal of the Early Republic, 1979–97. Since 1999, he has been series editor for the U.S. Naval Institute Press's "Library of Naval Biography" and since 2000, series co-editor of "New Perspectives on Maritime History and Nautical Archeology" with the University Press of Florida.

== Honors and awards ==
- Texas A&M Bush Excellence Award for Faculty in International Teaching, 2007.
- Texas A&M College of Liberal Arts, Teaching Excellence Award, 1985, 2004.
- Society for Historians of the Early American Republic, Meritorious Service Award, 1996.
- North American Society for Oceanic History, K. Jack Bauer Award for contributions to the field of maritime history, 1990 and 2007.
- Commodore Dudley W. Knox Naval History Lifetime Achievement Award, 2013.
- The North American Society of Oceanic History's James C. Bradford Dissertation Research Fellowship is named in honor of his distinguished contributions to the field of American naval history.

== Published works ==
- Anne Arundel County, Maryland: A Bicentennial History, 1649–1977, edited by James C. Bradford. Annapolis: Anne Arundel Bicentennial Committee, 1977.
- Command under Sail: Makers of the American Naval Tradition, 1775–1850, edited by James C. Bradford. Annapolis, Md.: United States Naval Institute, 1985.
- The Papers of John Paul Jones, microform, edited by James C. Bradford. Cambridge, UK; Alexandria, VA: Chadwyck-Healey, 1986. 10 microfilm reels; 35 mm.
- Guide to the Microfilm Edition of the Papers of John Paul Jones, 1747–1792. Alexandria, Va.: Chadwyck-Healey, 1986.
- Captains of the Old Steam Navy: Makers of the American Naval Tradition, 1840–1880, edited by James C. Bradford. Annapolis, Md.: Naval Institute Press, 1986.
- Admirals of the New Steel Navy: Makers of the American Naval Tradition, 1880–1930. Annapolis, Md.: Naval Institute Press, 1990. ISBN 0-87021-003-3 OCLC 20637541
- Crucible of Empire: The Spanish–American War and Its Aftermath, edited by James C. Bradford. Annapolis, Md.: Naval Institute Press, 1993. ISBN 1-55750-079-7 OCLC 27264736
- Raising a Crab: America's Navy, edited by James C. Bradford. Annapolis, Md.: Naval Institute Press, 1993.
- Eagle, Shield and Anchor: Readings in American Naval History, edited by James C. Bradford. New York, N.Y.: American Heritage Custom Pub. Group, 1994.
- Quarterdeck and Bridge: Two Centuries of American Naval Leaders, edited by James C. Bradford. Annapolis, Md.: Naval Institute Press, 1997. ISBN 1-55750-073-8 OCLC 35397884
- The Military and Conflict Between Cultures: Soldiers at the Interface, edited by James C. Bradford. College Station, Tex.: Texas A&M University Press, 1997. ISBN 0-89096-743-1 OCLC 35548945
- Atlas of American Military History, edited by James C. Bradford. New York: Oxford University Press, 2003. ISBN 0-19-521661-X OCLC 52494694
- International Encyclopedia of Military History, James C. Bradford, editor; preface by Jeremy Black. New York: Routledge, 2006. ISBN 0-415-93661-6 OCLC 56329704
- A Companion to American Military History, Vol. I & II. Wiley-Blackwell. 2010. p. 1080. ISBN 978-1-4051-6149-7. OCLC 316098909. (editor)

== Sources ==
- Texas A&M Faculty biography
