= Research Chair in Naval History =

Position in the Naval Historical Center

The United States Secretary of the Navy's Research Chair in Naval History was established in 1987 by the then Naval Historical Center, Department of the Navy (now known as the Naval History & Heritage Command). This competitive appointment was designed to support, for up to three years, a scholar in researching and writing a major monograph on the history of the U.S. Navy since 1945.

Past holders of this chair include:

- 1987–1988 Dr. Malcolm "Kip" Muir
- 1988–1989
- 1989–1990 Dr. William N. Still, Jr.
- 1990–1991 Dr. Christopher McKee
- 1991–1992 Dr. James Recknor
- 2003 John C. Reilly Jr.
