= Fred D. Kirtland =

American Navy officer (c.1893–1972)

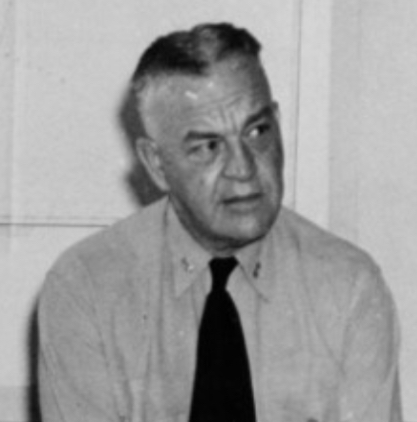
- Birth name: Fred Darrel Kirtland
- Born: 1892 or 1893; Salina, Kansas, US
- Died: October 7, 1972 (aged 79); St. Francis Hospital, Flower Hill, New York, US
- Allegiance: United States
- Branch: Navy
- Rank: Vice Admiral
- Battles / wars: World War I; World War II; Gilbert and Marshall Islands campaign
- Awards: Legion of Merit

Fred Darrel Kirtland (1892 or 1893 – October 7, 1972) was an American Navy officer.

== Biography ==
Born in 1892 or 1893 in Salina, Kansas, Kirtland graduated from the United States Naval Academy in 1916. He served on the USS Wyoming during World War I, and later studied at Columbia University.

Kirtland became commander of the USS Alabama on March 20, 1943, succeeding George B. Wilson. He was one of the most well-liked officers on the ship. He commanded the ship through the Gilbert and Marshall Islands campaign, engaging in combat at the Gilbert Islands in November and December 1943. He sailed to Nauru, bombed the island, then anchored at the Kwajalein Atoll to plan future attacks on the Caroline Islands.

After retiring, Kirtland moved to Port Washington, New York. He died at St. Francis Hospital in Flower Hill, New York, on October 7, 1972, aged 79. His funeral was held on October 10, at his burial site of Mount St. Mary Cemetery in Flushing, Queens.
