= William H. White (maritime writer) =

American novelist

William H. White is an American writer specializing in historical novels relating to the age of sail.

== Career ==
White served in the United States Navy during the Vietnam War.

He serves on the board of trustees of the USS Constitution Museum in Boston, the National Maritime Historical Society, and is a consultant to the replica 1812 privateer Lynx. White is also a Corresponding Fellow of the Massachusetts Historical Society.

== Published works ==
1812 Trilogy: The Isaac Biggs Series

- A Press of Canvas (2000)
- A Fine Tops'l Breeze (2001)
- The Evening Gun (2003)

The Oliver Baldwin Series

- In Pursuit of Glory
- The Greater the Honor

Other Books

- When Fortune Frowns (2009)

== Sources ==
- Sea Fiction Website
