= Gene A. Smith =

American historian

Gene Allen Smith
- Born: September 7, 1963 (age 62); Alabama, U.S.
- Education: Auburn University
- Occupation: Historian
- Employer: Texas Christian University

Gene A. Smith is an American historian. He was a professor of American History, and the Director of the Center for Texas Studies at Texas Christian University, retiring in May 2026. He is the author of six books, and co-author of another. He further served as editor (or co-editor) of seven additional volumes.

== Early life ==
Smith was born on September 7, 1963, in Fort Payne, Alabama, and grew up in Albertville. Playing sports and serving in the Civil Air Patrol as a teen, he graduated from Albertville High School in 1981. Growing up a University of Alabama fan, he instead chose to attend Auburn University for academic reasons—to become a veterinarian. Ultimately, a course in chemistry put him on the path to becoming a historian. Serving in Theta Xi fraternity, he eventually became vice-president and that service, assisted him to become the Auburn University Fraternity Advisor during the 1987–1988 academic years. He earned a bachelor's degree at Auburn University in 1984, followed by a master's degree in 1987, and a PhD in 1991.

== Career ==
Smith began his career during the fall of 1991 in academia at (Eastern Montana College), now Montana State University Billings. He then became a professor of American History at Texas Christian University in the fall of 1994, where he would also become the director of the Center for Texas Studies in 2002. He also served as the Class of 1957 Distinguished Professor in Naval Heritage at the United States Naval Academy in the 2013–14, and 2022-23 academic years.

His first book, 'For the Purposes of Defense': The Politics of the Jeffersonian Gunboat Program, based on his PhD dissertation, looked at Thomas Jefferson's naval strategy during the early nineteenth century and War of 1812. He authored two more books about Manifest Destiny, including Filibusters and Expansionists with Frank Lawrence Owsley, Jr. of Auburn University, which was praised as "a quality piece of historical writing" and "a valuable contribution to the historiography of expansion and the Gulf South" in The Journal of Southern History. Another book is a biography of Thomas ap Catesby Jones, who served in the War of 1812 and the Mexican–American War. Smith has also authored a book about the role of slaves in the War of 1812, which was lauded as "essential and informative reading" in the Journal of the Early Republic. He has also published as the lead author a military history textbook, entitled In Harm's Way: The American Military Experience (Oxford University Press, 2019), which combines military, naval and air power history and is used at a number of institutions across the United States.

== Selected works ==
=== As an author ===
- Smith, Gene A. (1995). 'For the Purposes of Defense': The Politics of the Jeffersonian Gunboat Program. Newark, Delaware: University of Delaware Press. ISBN 9780838752906. OCLC 491001519.
- Smith, Gene A. (1996). Iron and Heavy Guns: Duel Between the Monitor and Merrimac. Abilene, Texas: McWhiney Foundation Press. ISBN 9781886661158. OCLC 38887568.
- Owsley, Frank Lawrence Jr.; Smith, Gene A. (1997). Filibusters and Expansionists: Jeffersonian Manifest Destiny, 1800–1821. Tuscaloosa, Alabama: University of Alabama Press. ISBN 9780817351175. OCLC 144535228.
- Smith, Gene A. (2000). Thomas Ap Catesby Jones: Commodore of Manifest Destiny. Annapolis, Maryland: Naval Institute Press. OCLC 606269386.
- Smith, Gene A. (2013). The Slaves' Gamble: Choosing Sides in the War of 1812. Basingstoke: Palgrave Macmillan. ISBN 9780230342088. OCLC 840425895.

=== As an editor ===
- Lacarrière-Latour, Arsène; Smith, Gene A. (1999). Historical Memoir of the War in West Florida and Louisiana in 1814-15: With an Atlas. Gainesville, Florida: University of Florida Press. ISBN 9780813016757. OCLC 262319413.
- Smith, Gene A., ed. (2004). A British Eyewitness at the Battle of New Orleans: The Memoir of Royal Navy Admiral Robert Aitchison, 1808-1827. New Orleans, Louisiana: Historic New Orleans Collection. ISBN 9780917860508. OCLC 835371001.
- Hilton, Sylvia L.; Smith, Gene A., eds. (2011). Nexus of Empire: Negotiating Loyalty and Identity in the Revolutionary Borderlands, 1760s-1820s. Gainesville, Florida: University Press of Florida. ISBN 9780813037271. OCLC 696718683.
- Gutiérrez, Pedro Luengo Gutiérrez; Smith, Gene Allen, eds. (2016). From Colonies to Countries in the North Caribbean: Military Engineers in the Development of Cities and Territories. Newcastle: Cambridge Scholars Publishing. ISBN 9781443885362. OCLC 957774800.
