= Navy-Marine Corps Relief Society =

American non-profit organization

- Founded: 1904
- Type: Non-operating private foundation (IRS exemption status): 501(c)(3)
- Purpose: Active duty and retired Sailors, Marines and their families
- Location: Arlington, Virginia, United States of America
- Region served: Global
- Key people: Chief Naval Personnel and Commandant of the Marine Corps rotate as Chair of the Board of Directors
- Volunteers: 3,600+
- Website: nmcrs.org
- Formerly called: Navy Relief Society

Navy-Marine Corps Relief Society (NMCRS) is an American non-profit organization that was founded in 1904. The Relief Society's mission is to build financial stability and well-being for Sailors, Marines and their families.

NMCRS is the oldest of the military aid societies.

NMCRS makes interest-free loans to cover basic living expenses including utilities, housing and food. It also distributes funds for funeral costs, car repairs, insurance, medical bills, and other expenses. In 2025, the Releif Society helped more than 211,000 retired and active duty Sailors and Marines and their families, including providing $47 million in financial assistance to 38,000 clients .

NMCRS operates on a global scale, with a network of 213 offices located on land and at sea.

In 2020, NMCRS launched an interest-free program to cover the cost of moving pets during a permanent change of station or move.

In the year 2024, the NMCRS celebrated its 120th anniversary. Since its founding in 1904, the organization has distributed over $2 billion in financial assistance to more than 5 million active-duty and retired Sailors, Marines, and their families.

In 2024, NMCRS reported total revenue of $30,153,450, total expenses of $38,487,135, and total assets of $188,138,491.

== Fundraising ==
Every year during the month of March, the Department of the Navy hosts its annual Active Duty Fund Drive in support of the NMCRS.

NMCRS participates in the joint #missionGIVE Giving Tuesday campaign with the other military relief societies. Military Times reported that the prior year's Giving Tuesday campaign raised more than $270,000 in donations and that Lockheed Martin contributed $1 million. In addition, it was reported that Lockheed would match donations up to $1 million in 2024.
