= North American Society for Oceanic History =

The North American Society for Oceanic History (NASOH) is the national organization in the United States of America for professional historians, underwater archaeologists, archivists, librarians, museum specialists and others working in the broad field of maritime history. NASOH is an affiliated organization of the American Historical Association.

NASOH was founded in 1973 to provide a forum for maritime history and remains actively devoted to the study and promotion of maritime history. The society's objectives are to promote the exchange of information among its members and others interested in the history of the seas, lakes, and inland waterways; to call attention to books, articles, and documents pertinent to naval and maritime history; and to work with local, regional, national, international, and government organizations toward the goal of fostering a more general awareness and appreciation for North America's naval and maritime heritage. NASOH also houses the U.S. Commission on Maritime History which is a constituent member of the International Commission for Maritime History.

NASOH's organizational records are deposited in the Joyner Library] at East Carolina University

== Annual conferences ==
Every year NASOH holds an academic conference, where its members present papers on current research in maritime history. Each year, the conferences are held in a different location. The site is usually at a maritime location, which will allow members to link a broad national and global understanding of maritime history to local and regional maritime activities. Meetings have been held on the West Coast, the Gulf Coast, the Great Lakes, the Mid- and Southern-Atlantic coasts of the United States as well as in Canada and in Bermuda.

== Prizes ==
The president of NASOH awards on occasion the K. Jack Bauer Award to honor those who have given distinguished service to NASOH and have made life-time contributions to the field of maritime history.

The Charles Dana Gibson Award honors the best article on North American maritime history published in a peer-reviewed journal.

Each year, a panel of selected NASOH members reviews all the books published during the year in the field of maritime history to select the John Lyman Book Awards that are given annually by the society in the following six categories: Canadian naval and maritime history, U.S. naval history, U.S. maritime history, science and technology, reference works and published primary sources, and biography and autobiography.

The society also gives a number of awards to graduate students:

Chad Smith Student Travel Grants are awarded to assist students in funding travel to its annual meeting to deliver a paper at the meeting. The award is named in honor of Philip Chadwick Foster Smith, maritime museum curator, maritime historian, and an early member of NASOH.

Clark G. Reynolds Student Paper Award is provided each year to the author of the best paper by a graduate student delivered at the society's annual conference. Named in honor of Clark G. Reynolds (1939–2005)—naval historian, museum curator, and the first executive officer of NASOH—the prize will consist of assistance in publishing the essay in The Northern Mariner(the journal co-sponsored by NASOH and the Canadian Nautical Research Society), a membership in NASOH, and a handsome plaque.

The James C. Bradford Dissertation Research Fellowship is named in honor of NASOH past-president Dr. James C. Bradford, in recognition of his distinguished contributions to the field of American naval history. Topics in all periods of United States and North American naval history, including strategy, tactics, and operations; institutional development and administration; biography, personnel, and social development; exploration, science, and technology and science; and policy and diplomacy. Applicants must have completed all requirements for the Ph.D. at the time of application and have an approved dissertation proposal on file at their degree-granting institution.

== Publications ==
The society publishes at regular intervals the NASOH Newsletter to inform members about activities within the field of maritime history.

From 2007, NASOH also publishes in association with the Canadian Nautical Research Society the refereed academic journal The Northern Mariner (TNM).

From time to time, NASOH publishes books of collected papers from its annual conferences and NASOH will be publishing a series of handbooks for use in teaching aspects of maritime history.

== Presidents of NASOH ==
1. William A. Baker January 1, 1976 to December 31, 1980
2. Timothy J. Runyan January 1, 1981 to December 31, 1985
3. Dean C. Allard January 1, 1986 to December 31, 1989
4. Barry M. Gough January 1, 1990 to December 31, 1991
5. William N. Still, Jr. January 1, 1992 to December 31, 1995
6. Briton C. Busch January 1, 1996 to December 31, 1999
7. William S. Dudley January 1, 2000 to December 31, 2003
8. John Hattendorf January 1, 2004 to December 31, 2007
9. James C. Bradford January 1, 2008 to May 2011
10. Warren Riess May 2011 to May 2015
11. Gene A. Smith May 2015 to May 2019
12. Amy Mitchell-Cook May 2019 to May 2023
13. Paul E. Fontenoy. May 2023 to May 2025
14. Lincoln P. Paine May 2025 to Present

== See also ==
- List of history awards
