= Naval History and Heritage Command =

U.S. Navy command dedicated to American naval history and heritage

U.S. Naval History and Heritage Command
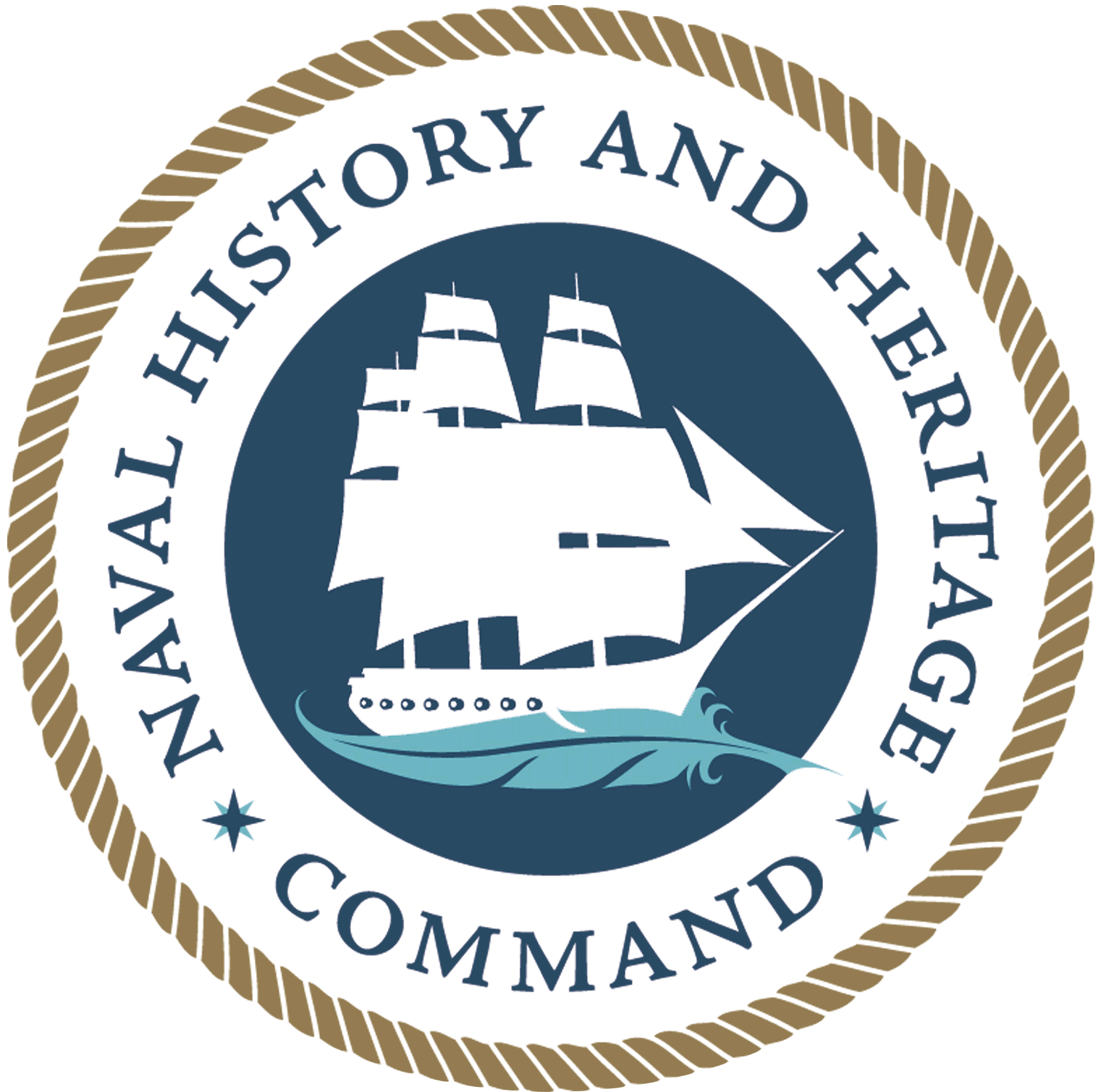
- Active: 1944–present
- Country: United States of America
- Garrison/HQ: Washington Navy Yard, Washington, D.C.
- Website: https://www.history.navy.mil/

Commanders
- Current commander: Rear Admiral Samuel J. Cox

The Naval History and Heritage Command, formerly the Naval Historical Center, is an Echelon II command responsible for the preservation, analysis, and dissemination of U.S. naval history and heritage located at the historic Washington Navy Yard. The NHHC is composed of 42 facilities in 13 geographic locations including the Navy Department Library, 10 museums and 1 heritage center, USS Constitution repair facility and detachment, and historic ship ex-USS Nautilus.

== Command history ==
The Naval History and Heritage Command traces its lineage to 1800, when President John Adams requested Benjamin Stoddert, the first Secretary of the Navy, prepare a catalog of professional books for use in the Secretary's office. When the British invaded Washington in 1814, this collection, containing the finest works on naval history from America and abroad, was rushed to safety outside the Federal City. After that, the library had many locations, including a specially designed space in the State, War, and Navy Building (now the Indian Treaty Room of the Eisenhower Executive Office Building) next to the White House.

When the library was placed under the Bureau of Navigation in 1882, the director, noted international lawyer and U.S. Naval Academy professor James R. Soley, gathered the rare books scattered throughout Navy Department offices, collected naval prints and photographs, and subscribed to professional periodicals. He also began collecting and preserving naval records, particularly those of the American Civil War. Congress initially recognized his efforts by authorizing funds for office staff and combining the library and records sections into the Office of Library and Naval War Records.

Six years later, the United States Congress appropriated the funds to print the first volume in a monumental documentary series, Official Records of the Union and Confederate Navies in the War of the Rebellion. Completed in 1927 with the publication of volume 31, the series marked the beginning of a commitment to collect, edit, and publish historical naval documents, a mission that the History Command continues to carry out in its American Revolution and War of 1812 documentary projects. In 1915, the appropriations for publications, the library, and naval war records were combined. The office received a new title—Office of Naval Records and Library.

Once America entered World War I, the emphasis shifted to gathering documents on current naval operations. Secretary of the Navy Josephus Daniels directed Admiral William S. Sims, Commander U.S. Naval Forces Operating in European Waters, to collect war diaries, operational reports, and other historic war materials of naval commands in his London headquarters.

To handle World War I records in Washington, a Historical Section was established in the Office of the Chief of Naval Operations and housed in the new Navy Department ("Main Navy") Building on Constitution Avenue. When the war ended, Admiral Sims' London collection and photographs and new motion pictures from the various Navy bureaus were transferred to the Historical Section. Holding more than 50,000 volumes, the library remained in the State, War, and Navy Building.

In 1921, a former member of Admiral Sims' wartime staff, Captain Dudley W. Knox, was named head of the Office of Naval Records and Library and the Historical Section. For the next twenty-five years, he was the driving force behind the Navy's historical program, earning for the office an international reputation in the field of naval archives and history. The Historical Section was absorbed into Naval Records and Library in 1927. Knox's additional appointment as the Curator for the Navy envisioned a display of the nation's sea heritage in a naval museum in Washington. In 1961, Admiral Arleigh Burke, Chief of Naval Operations, established the U.S. Naval Historical Display Center (now the United States Navy Museum).

At President Franklin D. Roosevelt's suggestion, Knox began several documentary series. Seven volumes on the Quasi War with France and six volumes relating to the war with the Barbary Powers were ultimately published. World War II halted plans for similar publications on the American Revolution, the War of 1812, the Mexican–American War, and World War I. During World War II, Knox turned his attention to collecting documents generated by naval operations in the global conflict. He immediately began a campaign to gather and arrange operation plans, action reports, and war diaries into well-controlled archives staffed by professional historians who came on board as naval reservists.

To complement the developing World War II operational archives, the Knox group pioneered an oral history program. Participants in the significant Atlantic and Pacific operations and battles were interviewed as soon as possible after their wartime engagements. When Pulitzer Prize winner and Harvard history professor Samuel Eliot Morison was commissioned by President Roosevelt to prepare the fifteen-volume History of United States Naval Operations in World War II, he relied not only on his own combat experience but also on those records assembled in Knox's archives.

In 1944, Secretary of the Navy James Forrestal established the Office of Naval History to coordinate the Morison project, as well as the wartime administrative histories being written by Navy commands, under the direction of Princeton professor Robert G. Albion. Knox served as deputy director of Naval History under the Director, Admiral Edward C. Kalbfus, but the Office of Naval Records and Library at first remained separate until March 1949 when it merged with the Office of Naval History to form the Naval Records and History Division of the Office of the Chief of Naval Operations. In 1952 it was renamed the Naval History Division.

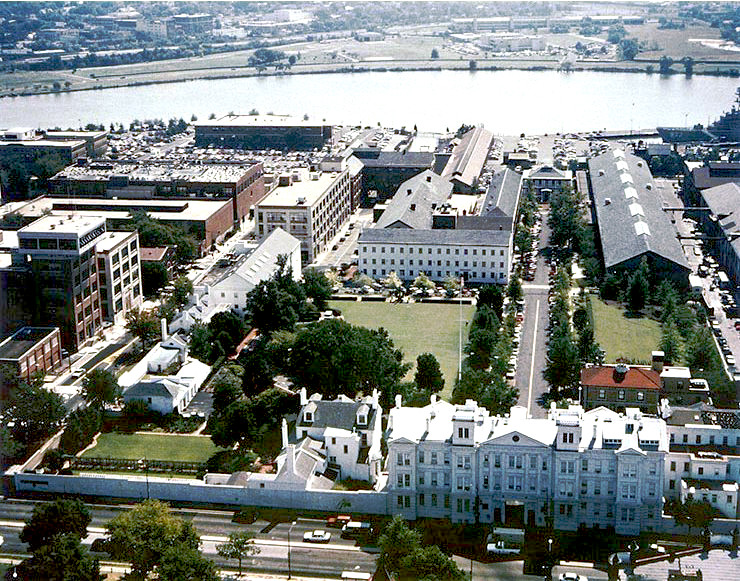
Naval History and Heritage Command

The eventual home for the Navy's historians was the Washington Navy Yard in Southeast Washington, which in 1961 was converted from an industrial facility to an administrative center. The first component of the Naval History Division in the yard was the Navy Museum (later the United States Navy Museum), established in 1961. In 1963, the Operational Archives moved to the Navy Yard. The other sections of the Naval History Division followed in 1970, occupying several scattered buildings.

An organizational change in 1971 shifted the Naval History Division from a headquarters establishment to a field activity called the Naval Historical Center, under the Chief of Naval Operations. Most of the center's activities were brought together in 1982 when they moved into the historic building complex named to honor Dudley W. Knox, who perhaps did more than any other individual to strengthen the Navy's commitment to its historical heritage and traditions.

In 1986, the Navy Art Collection and Gallery and the Naval Aviation History and Publication Division, both already located in the Washington Navy Yard, became part of the Naval Historical Center.

2008 was a year of change for the Navy's history program. First, the command was streamlined into four major components: Histories and Archives, Museums and Collections, Integration and Outreach, and Operations. Following the realignment of the Navy's dozen museums under the Director of Naval History, the Naval Historical Center was redesignated the Naval History & Heritage Command on 1 December 2008. In the spring of 2009, the NHHC established a presence on the social media sites Facebook, Twitter, LinkedIn, Goodreads, and Delicious.

== Director ==
The position of Director of Naval History was established in 1944.

- Admiral Edward C. Kalbfus, USN, July 1944 – December 1945
- Vice Admiral Vincent R. Murphy, USN (ret.), December 1945 – June 1946
- Rear Admiral John B. Heffernan, USN (ret.), July 1946 – October 1956
- Rear Admiral Ernest M. Eller, USN (ret.), October 1956 – January 1970
- Rear Admiral F. Kent Loomis, USN (ret.), 24 January 1970 – 31 July 1970
- Vice Admiral Edwin B. Hooper, USN (ret.), August 1970 – July 1976
- Rear Admiral John D. H. Kane, USN (ret.), August 1976 – December 1985
- Dr. Ronald H. Spector, 21 July 1986 – 19 July 1989
- Dr. Dean C. Allard, 29 July 1989 – 31 January 1995
- Dr. William S. Dudley, 23 July 1995 – 30 September 2005
- Rear Admiral Paul E. Tobin Jr., USN (ret.), 25 July 2005 – January 2008
- Rear Admiral Jay A. DeLoach, USNR (ret.), 23 June 2008 – 14 May 2012
- Captain Henry J. Hendrix, USN, 14 May 2012 – 27 June 2014
- Rear Admiral Samuel J. Cox, USN (ret.), 29 December 2014 – present

== Collections ==
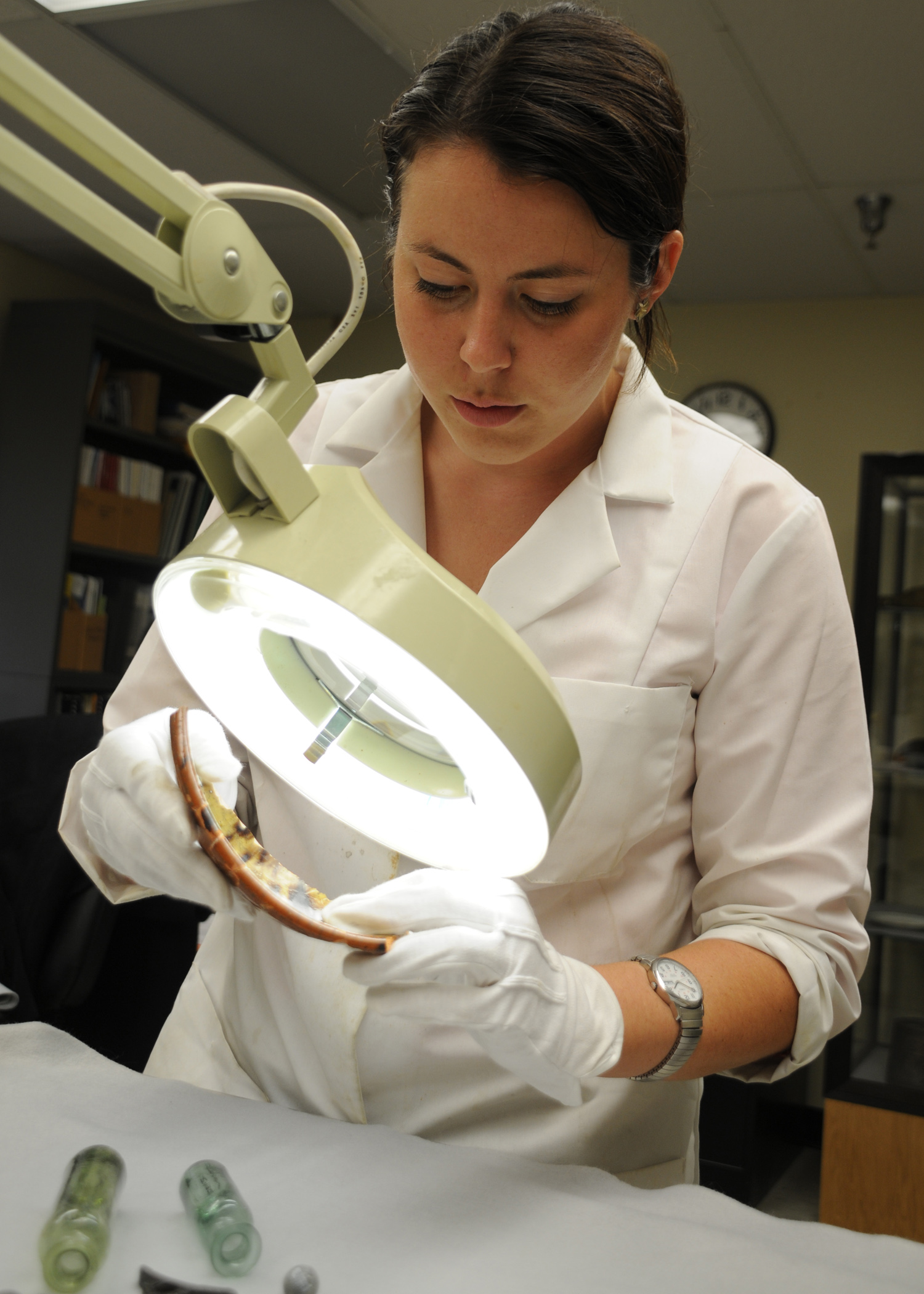
An artifact conservator at the Naval History and Heritage Command inspects a piece of pottery recovered from the wreck of the sloop-of-war USS Scorpion.

- The Command procures and maintains records, manuscripts, books, photographs, artifacts, and artwork that document the history of the United States Navy. Extensive collections at the Command's headquarters on the Washington Navy Yard include:
- Archives—Millions of official operational records, historical documents, personal papers, officer biographies, oral histories, and manuscripts related to naval operations, policy, and strategy, including ships’ deck logs dating back thirty years and annual command operations reports of active U.S. Navy ships, aviation units, and shore commands
- Historical Artifacts—More than 200,000 artifacts, such as shipboard equipment, anchors, bells, uniforms, flags, and weapons from some of the Navy's most famous fighting ships and personnel
- Archaeological Artifacts-Over 9,000 artifacts recovered and documented from sunken military craft such as personal effects, ordnance, ship's rigging and hull elements, and ceramic vessels
- Photos—More than 500,000 historic still photos in a dedicated photo collection, with thousands more in the records collections housed in the Command's archives
- Art—More than 18,000 paintings, prints, drawings, and sculptures
- Library—More than 150,000 books and 80,000 manuscripts related to naval, maritime, and military history in the official Navy Department Library

Similar collections that document the Navy's history in specialized areas of interest are located at the eleven official U.S. Navy museums nationwide.

== U.S. Navy museums ==
Ten official Navy museums are dedicated to making available the artifacts, documents, and art that best embody U.S. naval history and heritage for present and future generations.

- National Museum of the United States Navy – Washington, DC
- National Museum of the American Sailor – Great Lakes, IL
- Hampton Roads Naval Museum – Norfolk, VA
- National Naval Aviation Museum – Pensacola, FL
- Naval Undersea Museum – Keyport, WA
- Puget Sound Navy Museum – Bremerton, WA
- Naval War College Museum – Newport, RI
- U.S. Navy Seabee Museum – Port Hueneme, CA
- Submarine Force Library and Museum – Groton, CT
- U.S. Naval Academy Museum – Annapolis, MD

== USS Constitution and NHHC Detachment Boston ==
The mission includes but is not limited to: plan and perform all maintenance, repair, and restoration of USS Constitution; perform annual inspections of Constitution, reporting all work necessary to maintain the ship in satisfactory material condition to perform its mission; and provide a plan of action and milestones for any corrective action; as far as practicable, ensure material compliance and documentation with the historical requirements for the ship, as close to its 1812 configuration as possible. The detachment was established on 25 October 1991. NHHC DET Boston is a detachment under the direct supervision of the Director, Naval History and Heritage Command, Washington, D.C. Located near the ship, the USS Constitution Museum is a private museum that interprets the ship and her history.

== Navy Reserve units ==
=== Naval Reserve Combat Documentation Detachment 206 ===
Assigned to the History Command since 1991, the unit deploys its teams to U.S. Navy, joint, and combined commands worldwide where they conduct oral history interviews, collect historically significant artifacts and records, and document operations through photography and art. Their collection effort contributes to the Navy's lessons learned and preserves the history of current naval operations during crisis response, wartime, declared national emergency, or in situations as directed. Teams have documented the Navy's role in the Persian Gulf War, Operation Restore Hope (Haiti) and Operation Allied Force (Kosovo); counter-narcotics actions in the Caribbean; fleet exercises, special warfare activities, Information Technology (IT-21); the attack on, and the rebuilding of USS Cole (DDG-67); the 11 September 2001 attack on the Pentagon; and the Global War on Terrorism. In 2001 eleven unit members were recalled to active duty to support the History Command's documentation collection efforts related to Operation Noble Eagle and Operation Enduring Freedom. For Operation Iraqi Freedom and in support of the Navy's Task Force History, four unit members were recalled to active duty.

=== Naval Reserve Naval History Volunteer Training Unit 0615 ===
This non-pay Naval Reserve unit provides project support to the Naval History & Heritage Command in keeping with the larger goal of enhancing the Navy's effectiveness by preserving, analyzing, and interpreting its history and heritage. Unit members work on long-term historical projects with the NHC staff, processing archival collections, conducting oral history interviews with Pearl Harbor survivors, and digitizing histories for the Command's website or publication in print. VTU members also conduct end-of-tour interviews with key naval leaders.

== Recent publications ==
- Approaching Storm: Conflict in Asia, 1945–1965, by Edward J. Marolda, The U.S. Navy and the Vietnam War series. 2009. ISBN 978-0-945274-57-5
- Nixon's Trident: Naval Power in Southeast Asia, 1968–1972, by John Darrell Sherwood, The U.S. Navy and the Vietnam War series. 2009. ISBN 978-0-945274-58-2
- From Hot War to Cold: The U.S. Navy and National Security Affairs, 1945–1955, by Jeffrey G. Barlow. Stanford University Press, 2009. ISBN 9780804756662
- Diplomats in Blue: U.S. Naval Officers in China, 1922–1933, by William Reynolds Braisted. University Press of Florida, 2009. ISBN 978-0-8130-3288-7
- Blue & Gold and Black: Racial Integration of the U.S. Naval Academy, by Robert J. Schneller Jr. College Station: Texas A&M University Press, 2008. ISBN 978-1-60344-000-4.
- Magnificent Mavericks: Transition of the Naval Ordnance Test Station from Rocket Station to Research, Development, Test, and Evaluation Center, 1948–58, by Elizabeth Babcock. Vol. 3 in The Navy at China Lake. Washington: Naval History & Heritage Command with Naval Air Systems Command, 2008. ISBN 978-0-945274-56-8
- The World Cruise of the Great White Fleet: Celebrating 100 Years of Global Partnerships and Security, Michael J. Crawford, editor. Washington: Naval History & Heritage Command, 2008. ISBN 978-0-945274-59-9.
- Anchor of Resolve: A History of U.S. Naval Forces Central Command/Fifth Fleet, by Robert J. Schneller Jr. Washington: Naval History & Heritage Command, 2007. ISBN 9780945274551
- Black Sailor, White Navy: Racial Unrest in the Fleet during the Vietnam War Era, by John Darrell Sherwood, New York: New York University Press, 2007.ISBN 0-8147-4036-7
- Interpreting Old Ironsides: An Illustrated Guide to USS Constitution, by Charles E. Brodine Jr., Michael J. Crawford, and Christine F. Hughes. Washington: Naval Historical Center, 2007. ISBN 978-0-945274-54-4.
- The U.S. Navy in the Korean War, by Edward J. Marolda. Annapolis: Naval Institute Press, 2007. ISBN 978-1-59114-487-8
- Breaking the Color Barrier: The U.S. Naval Academy's First Black Midshipmen and the Struggle for Racial Equality, by Robert Schneller Jr. New York: New York University Press, 2005. ISBN 0-8147-4013-8.
- Afterburner: Naval Aviators and the Vietnam War, by John Darrell Sherwood. New York: New York University Press, 2004. ISBN 0-8147-9842-X.
- Against All Odds: U.S. Sailors in the War of 1812, by Charles Brodine, Michael Crawford, and Christine Hughes, 2004. GPO Stock No. 008-046-00204-5, ISBN 0-945274-50-5.
- Sea Raiders of the American Revolution: The Continental Navy in European Waters, by E. Gordon Bowen-Hassell, Dennis M. Conrad, and Mark L. Hayes, 2003. GPO Stock No. 008-046-00202-9, ISBN 0-16-051400-2

== See also ==
- Department of Defense Historical Advisory Committee
- Research Chair in Naval History (USNA)
- History of the United States Navy
- List of maritime museums in the United States
- Military history of the United States
- Secretary of the Navy's Advisory Subcommittee on Naval History
- Underwater Archaeology Branch
- United States Army Center of Military History
- United States Marine Corps History Division
- Bibliography of early American naval history
