= Bibliography of early United States naval history =

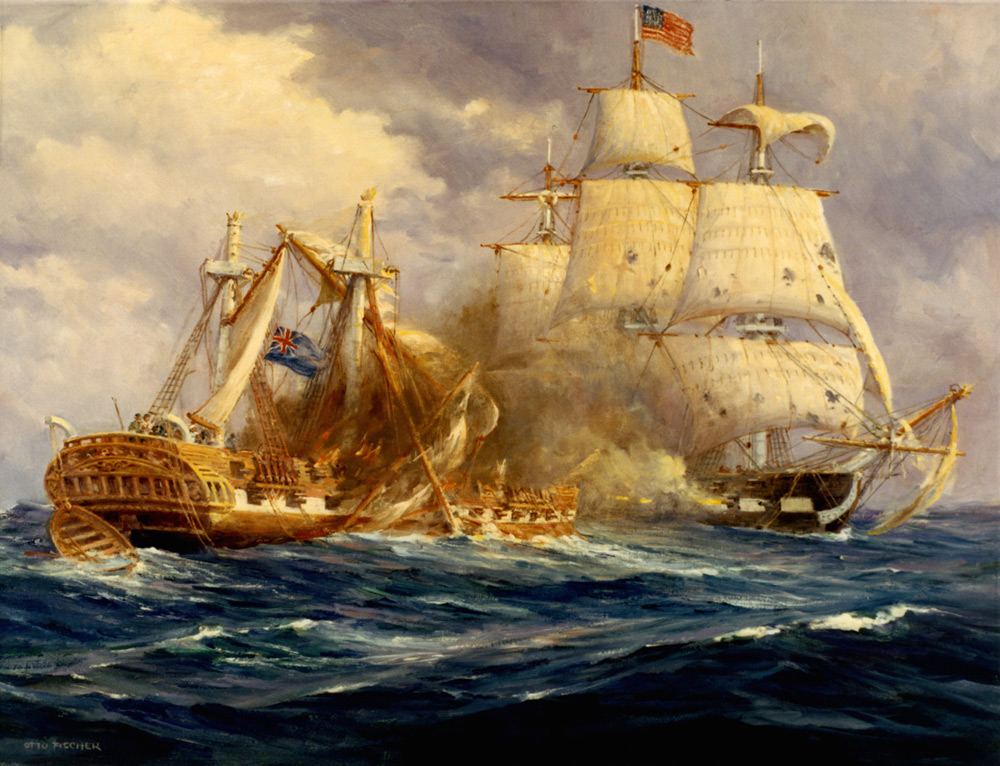
USS Constitution vs. HMS Guerriere

Historical accounts for early U.S. naval history now occur across the spectrum of two and more centuries. This Bibliography lends itself primarily to reliable sources covering early U.S. naval history beginning around the American Revolution period on through the 18th and 19th centuries and includes sources which cover notable naval commanders, Presidents, important ships, major naval engagements and corresponding wars. The bibliography also includes sources that are not committed to the subject of U.S. naval history per se but whose content covers this subject extensively.

Among the contemporary and earlier historical accounts are primary sources, historical accounts, often derived from letters, dispatches, government and military records, captain's logs and diaries, etc., written by authors who were involved in or closely associated to the historical episode in question. Primary source material is often collected, compiled and published by other editors also, sometimes many years after the historical subject has passed. Many of the authors are notable and even famous in their own right and are linked to their corresponding biographies.

== General naval history ==
- Abbot, Willis John (1896). The naval history of the United States. Vol. I. New York, Dodd, Mead and company.
- —— (1896). The naval history of the United States. Vol. II. New York, Dodd, Mead and company.
- Allen, Gardner W. (1909). Our Naval War with France.

Houghton Miffn Publishers, New York. p. 323, ISBN 0945726589, E'book

- Blanchard, Amos (1832). American military & naval biography:... (Note: Full title: American military & naval biography: containing the lives & characters of the officers of the revolution ... with some of the most eminent statesmen of that interesting period)
  Salisbury, Cincinnati, p. 604, E'book
- Bradford, James C. (1955). Quarterdeck and bridge: two centuries of American naval leaders.

Naval Institute Press, 1997. p. 455, ISBN 1-55750-073-8. Book (par view)

- Braynard, Frank Osborn, (1956). Famous American ships: being an historical sketch of the United States as told through its maritime life,

Hastings House, p. 207, Book (snippit view)

- Canney, Donald L. (2001). Sailing warships of the US Navy.

Chatham Publishing / Naval Institute Press. p. 224. ISBN 1-55750-990-5, Book (par view)

- Chapelle, Howard I. (1998). The History of the American Sailing Navy: The Ships and Their Development

Konecky & Konecky, p. 592, ISBN 1568522223, Book (snippit view)

- —— (1935). The history of American sailing ships, Volume 46

W. W. Norton & company, p. 400, ISBN 9780517023327, Book (snippit view)

- Chase, Mary Ellen (1959). Donald McKay and the Clipper Ships. Boston: Houghton Mifflin Company. OCLC 570331.
- Chesneau, Roger; Koleśnik, Eugène M.; Campbell, N. J. M.; (1979). Conway's All the World's Fighting Ships 1860–1905,
  Conway Maritime Press, 440 pages, ISBN 9780851771335, Book (no view)
- Clark, George Ramsey; Stevens, William Oliver; Alden, Carroll Storrs; Krafft, Herman Frederick
  A Short History of the United States Navy
  J. B. Lippincott Company, p. 503, E'book, 1911 edition, E'book, 1927 revised edition
- Coggeshall, George (1856). History of the American privateers, and letters-of-marque: ... G.Coggeshall;

C.T. Evans, Agent. New York. p. 438, E'book

- Cooper, James Fenimore (1846). Lives of distinguished American naval officers ... , (Note: Other works by James Fenimore Cooper : 1842: Richard Dale 1843: John Paul Jones 1846: Lives of distinguished American naval officers 1856: History of the navy of the United States of America)

Carey and Hart, Philadelphia.. p. 436. OCLC 620356, E'book

- —— (1864).History of the Navy of the United States of America: Continued to 1860 ..., Volumes 1–3
  Blakeman & Mason, p. 634, E'book
- Coletta, Paolo Enrico (1981). A Bibliography of American Naval History
  Naval Institute Press, ISBN 9780870211058, p. 453, Book (no view)
- —— (1856). History of the navy of the United States of America.

Stringer & Townsend, New York. p. 508. OCLC 197401914, E'book

- Cross, Wilbur (1960). Naval battles and heroes
  American Heritage Pub. Co, p. 153, Book (snippit view)
- Crothers, William L. (2000). The American-Built Clipper Ship, 1850–1856: Characteristics, Construction, and Details. Camden, ME:
  International Marine/Ragged Mountain Press; Blacklick, OH: McGraw-Hill. ISBN 0071358234.
- Cutler, Carl C. (1984). Greyhounds of the Sea: The Story of the American Clipper Ship (3rd ed.). Annapolis, MD:
  Naval Institute Press. ISBN 087021232X.
- Daughan, George C. (2008). If By Sea: The Forging of the American Navy – from the Revolution to the War of 1812

Basic Books; New York. p. 576, ISBN 9780465016075, Book

- Dept U.S. Navy. "Ships Histories Dictionary of American Naval Fighting Ships". Dictionary of American Naval Fighting Ships.

Department of the Navy – Naval History Center. Retrieved 1 November 2011, Book

- Dept U.S. Navy, "Dictionary of American Naval Fighting Ships : DANFS,

Department of the Navy – Naval History Center.

- Donovan, Frank Robert (1962). The tall frigates.
  Dodd, Mead; Original, Univ. Wisconsin. p. 23, Book (snippit view)
- Dorwart, Jeffery M.; Wolf, Jean K. (2001). The Philadelphia Navy Yard: From the Birth of the U.S. Navy to the Nuclear Age.

University of Pennsylvania Press. p. 271, ISBN 0812235754. Book (no view)

- Dresel, H.G., (1896), United States Naval Institute Proceedings, Volume 22(Naval warfare, tactics, weapons, etc.,)
  United States Naval Institute, Annapolis p.866, E'book
- Dull, Jonathan R. (2012). American Naval History, 1607–1865: Overcoming the Colonial Legacy,

Univ of Nebraska Press, p. 216, ISBN 9780803244719, Book (par view)

- Emmons, George Foster, Lieut. U.S.N. (1853). The navy of the United States, from the commencement, 1775 to 1853:
  with a brief history of each vessel's service and fate as appears upon record
  Gideon & Co., Washington, p. 208, E'book
- Fink, Leo Gregory (1962). Barry or Jones, "Father of the United States Navy"; Historical Reconnaissance

Jefferies & Manz, Inc, Philadelphia. p. 554, Book (snippit view)

- Folsom, Benjamin (2012). A Compilation of Biographical Sketches of Distinguished Officers in the American Navy.

Gale, Sabin Americana. p. 192, ISBN 1275649300. E'book

- —— (1984). Jack tars and commodores: the American Navy, 1783–1815

Houghton Mifflin, p. 318, ISBN 9780395353141, Book (snippit view)

- Franklin, Walter, (1961). Famous American ships: from the discovery of the New World to the Battle of Manila Bay,

Golden Press, p. 54, Book (snippit view)

- Frost, John, (1852). Universal naval history: comprising the naval operations of the principal maritime nations of the world, from the earliest period to the present time H.E

Robins and Company, New York, p. 608, E'book

- —— (2009). (Orig: 1844) American Naval Biography

E.H. Butler, Philadelphia, p. 432, ISBN 978-1-4290-2128-9, E'book

- Gillmer, Thomas, (1997). Old Ironsides,

International Marine/Ragged Mountain Press, p. 239, ISBN 978-0070245648, Book

- Goldsborough, Charles Washington (1824), The United States' Naval Chronicle,
  James Wilson, Washington, p. 395, E'book
- Hagan, Kenneth J., (1984), In Peace and War: Interpretations of American Naval History, 1775–1984,

Greenwood Press, p. 395, ISBN 9780313245817, Book

- —— (1992). This People's Navy: The Making of American Sea Power

The Free Press, New York. p. 468. ISBN 0-02-913471-4, Book

- Hamersly, Lewis Randolph (1901), List of officers of the Navy of the United States and of the Marine Corps, from 1775 to 1900
  L.R. Hamersly & Co, New York, p. 749, E'book
- Harbeck, Charles Thomas; Doyle, Agnes C., Ed.; (1906). A contribution to the bibliography of the history of the United States navy
  Priv. print. at the Riverside press, Cambridge, p. 247, E'book
- Harrison, Henry William (1858). Battlefields and naval exploits of the United States: ...,

H. C. Peck & Theo. Bliss, Philadelphia. p. 448, E'book

- Hattendorf, John B. (2007). The Oxford Encyclopedia of Maritime History

Oxford University Press, 4 volume set, ISBN 9780195130751, Book (no view)

- Hibben, Henry B.; United States. Navy Dept (1890). Navy-yard, Washington: History from organization, 1799, to present date.

Govt. Print. Office. p. 240, E'book

- Howarth, Stephen (1999). To Shining Sea: A History of the United States Navy, 1775–1998,

University of Oklahoma Press. p. 630. ISBN 0-8061-3026-1, Book (par view)

- James, William, (1826), The naval history of Great Britain...Volume 1,
  Harding, Lepard and Co., London, p. 567, E'book
- —— (1822), The naval history of Great Britain...Volume 2,
  Baldwin, Cradock and Joy, London p. 646, E'book
- —— (1837), The naval history of Great Britain...Volume 3,
  Richard Bentley, London, p. 386, E'book
- —— (1824), The naval history of Great Britain...Volume 4,
  Baldwin, Chadock and Joy, London, p. 500, E'book
- —— (1847/1859), The naval history of Great Britain...Volume 5,
  Richard Bentley, London, p. 458, E'book
- —— (1837), The naval history of Great Britain...Volume 6,
  Richard Bentley, London, p. 458, E'book
- Johnson, Robert Erwin (1964). Thence Round Cape Horn: The Story of United States Naval Forces on Pacific Station, 1818–1923

Annapolis: Naval Institute Press. p. 276. ISBN 978-0870217005, Book

- Judson, Clara Ingram (1943). Donald McKay: Designer of Clipper Ships
  Charles Scribner's Sons, New York, p. 136, Book
- Kimball, Horace (1858). The Naval Battles of the United States in the Different Wars with Foreign Nations, from the Commencement of the Revolution to the Present Time: Including Privateering
  Higgins, Bradley and Dayton, Boston, p. 278, E'book
- Labaree Benjamin W.; Fowler, William M.; Hattendorf, John; Sloan, Edward; Safford Jeffrey; German, Andrew (1998)

America and The Sea: A Maritime History,
Mystic Seaport publications, p. 686, ISBN 9780913372814, Book

- Lavery, Brian (1984), The Ship of the Line: The development of the battlefleet 1650–1850,
  Conway Maritime Press, p. 224, ISBN 978-0851772523, Book
- Leeman, William P. (2010). The Long Road to Annapolis: The Founding of the Naval Academy and the Emerging American Republic,

Univ of North Carolina Press. p. 292. ISBN 0807833835, Book

- McBride, James (1815). Naval biography: consisting of memoirs of the most distinguished officers of the American navy; to which is annexed the life of General Pike,

Morgan, Williams & co., Cincinnati, p. 296, E'book

- McMaster, John Bach (1914) A History of the People of the United States: 1803–1812.

D. Appleton and company, New York & London.. p. 590. Book

- Mahan, Alfred Thayer (1890), The influence of sea power upon history, 1660–1783
- Malcomson, Robert (2001), Warships of the Great Lakes, 1754–1834, (Note: Other works by Robert Malcomson: 1998: Lords of the Lake:The Naval War on Lake Ontario 1812–1814 2001: Warships of the Great Lakes, 1754–1834 2006: Historical dictionary of the War of 1812 2008: Capital in Flames: The American Attack on York, 1813)
  Chatham, p. 160, ISBN 978-1557509109, Book
- Morison, Samuel Eliot. (1967) "Old Bruin": Commodore Matthew C. Perry, 1794–1858: The American naval officer who helped found Liberia, Hunted Pirates in the West Indies, Practised Diplomacy With the Sultan of Turkey and the King of the Two Sicilies; Commanded the Gulf Squadron in the Mexican War, Promoted the Steam Navy and the Shell Gun, and Conducted the Naval Expedition Which Opened Japan (1967) pp. 61–76 online free to borrow
- Moore, James (1984), Building the Wooden Fighting Ship,
  Facts On File, Incorporated, p. 128, ISBN 978-1861762481, Book
- Morris, James M.; Kearns, Patricia M. (2011). Historical Dictionary of the United States Navy
  Scarecrow Press, p. 570, ISBN 9780810874794, Book
- Miller, Nathan (1997). The U.S. Navy: A History (3rd ed.)

Annapolis, MD: Naval Institute Press. ISBN 1-55750-595-0. OCLC 37211290, Book

- —— (2005). Broadsides: The Age of Fighting Sail, 1775–1815,

Wiley Book Sales, p. 388, ISBN 978-0471185178, Book

- Paine, Lincoln P. (1997). Ships of the world: an historical encyclopedia,

Houghton Mifflin Co., p. 680, ISBN 0395715563, 9780395715567, Book

- —— (2000). Ships of Discovery and Exploration,

Houghton Mifflin Harcourt, p. 188, ISBN 0395984157, 9780395984154. Book

- —— (2000). Warships of the world to 1900,

Houghton Mifflin Harcourt, New York, NY. p. 266. ISBN 0-395-98414-9. Book

- Paullin, Charles Oscar (1906). The navy of the American Revolution: its administration, its policy and its achievements (Note: Other works by Charles O. Paullin : 1906:The navy of the American Revolution: its administration, its policy and its achievements 1910:Commodore John Rodgers: Captain 1918:The battle of Lake Erie: a collection of documents, chiefly by Commodore Perry 1968:Paullin's history of naval administration, 1775–1911)

The Burrows Brothers Co. / Republican Printing Co., Iowa. p. 549, E'book

- Peterson, Charles Jacobs (1857) The American navy: being an authentic history of the United States navy ...

Jas. B. Smith & Co, Philadelphia. p. 545, E'book

- Preble, George Henry (N) (1870). The First Cruise of the United States Frigate Essex: With a Short Account of Her Origin, and Subsequent Career Until Captured by the British in 1814, and Her Ultimate Fate,
  Essex Institute, p. 108, E'book
- —— (1892). History of the United States Navy-yard, Portsmouth, N.H.,
  U.S. Government Printing Office, Washington, p. 219, E'book
- Scott, Robert Nicholson; Lazelle, Henry Martyn; Davis, George Breckenridge (1891). The War of the Rebellion: v. 1-53 [serial no. 1-111] Formal reports, both Union and Confederate, of the first seizures of United States property in the southern states ...
  U.S. Government Printing Office, p. 807, E'book
- Silverstone, Paul (2012). The Sailing Navy, 1775–1854,

Routledge, p. 112. ISBN 0415978726, Book

- Smith, Joshua M. (2009). Voyages, the age of sail: documents in American maritime history. 1492–1865
  University Press of Florida, p. 396, ISBN 9780813033044, Book (snippit view)
- Sondhaus, Lawrence (2001). Naval Warfare 1815–1914,

Taylor & Francis. p. 272. ISBN 0-415-21478-5. OCLC 44039349, Book

- Spears, John Randolph; Chamier, Frederick (1899). The history of our navy : from its origin to the end of the war with Spain, 1775–1898, Volume 4.

Charles Scribner's Sons, New York. p. 526, Book

- Stevens, William Oliver; Westcott, Allan Ferguson (1920), A History of Sea Power,
  George H. Doran Company, New York. p. 428, E'book
- Sweetman, Jack (2002). American Naval History: An Illustrated Chronology of the U.S. Navy and Marine Corps, 1775–present,

Naval Institute Press, Annapolis, MD:. ISBN 1-55750-867-4. Book

- Toll, Ian W. (2006). Six Frigates: The Epic History of the Founding of the U.S. Navy.,

W. W. Norton & Company, New York. p. 592. ISBN 978-0-393-05847-5. Book

- Tucker, Glenn (1963). Dawn like thunder: the Barbary wars and the birth of the U. S. Navy,

Bobbs-Merrill; Original, Univ. Michigan. p. 487, Book (snippit view)

- Tucker, Spencer C. (1988). Arming the Fleet. U.S. Ordnance in the Muzzle-Loading Era,

Naval Institute Press, p. 308, ISBN 9780870210075, Book

- Wiley, Edwin; Rines, Irving Everett; Hart, Albert Bushnell (1916). Lectures on the growth and development of the United States: illustrated, Volume 5.,

American Educational Alliance. p. 493, Book

- Wilentz, Sean (2005). The Rise of American Democracy. W.W. Norton & Company, New York, NY, 2006. ISBN 0-393-05820-4, Book
- Williams, Greg H. (1824). The French assault on American shipping, 1793–1813:. McFarland & Company, North Carolina, London. p. 536. ISBN 978-0-7864-3837-2, Book
- United States Navy Dept, Bureau of Naval Personnel, (1853). (P) Register of commissioned and warrant officers of the United States Navy and Marine Corps and reserve officers on active duty,

United States, Bureau of Naval Personnel, p. 140, Book

- United States Navy (1901). (P) Papers of William Vernon and the Navy board, 1776–1794. (Note: Letters to and from William Vernon to and from John Adams, John Hancock, William Ellery, James Warren instructing Vernon in the organization, financing and outfitting of the Continental Navy)

Board of the Eastern Dept, William Vernon, Rhode Island Historical Society (1901), Snow & Farnham, printers, Providence. p. 81, Book

- United States. Navy Dept. Bureau of Navigation (1918). Navy directory: officers of the United States Navy and Marine Corps,

Govt. Printing Office.. p. 188, Book

Top

== American Revolution ~ Continental Navy ==
- Allen, Gardner Weld (1913). A naval history of the American Revolution, Volume 1 (Note: Other works by Gardner Weld Allen: 1905:Our Navy and the Barbary Corsairs 1909:Our naval war with France 1913:A naval history of the American Revolution 1922:Captain Hector McNeill of the Continental navy 1927:Massachusetts privateers of the revolution 1929:Commodore Hull: Papers of Isaac Hull, Commodore United States Navy)

Houghton Mifflin Company, New York. p. 365, Book (snippit view)

- —— (1922). Captain Hector McNeill of the Continental navy,

Massachusetts Historical Society, Boston: (Original printing Harvard University Press) (Note: From the proceedings of the Massachusetts Historical Society for November 1921) p. 108, E'book

- —— (1927). Massachusetts privateers of the revolution,

The Massachusetts historical society. p. 356, Book (no view)

- Barnes, Ian; Royster, Charles, (2000). The Historical Atlas of the American Revolution,

Psychology Press. p. 208, Book (par view)

- Beattie, Donald W.; Collins J. Richard (1969). Washington's New England fleet: Beverly's role in its origins, 1775–77
  Newcomb & Gauss Co, p. 69, Book
- Bowen-Hassell, E. Gordon; Conrad, Dennis Michael; Hayes, Mark L. (2003).
  Sea Raiders of the American Revolution: The Continental Navy in European Waters,

Government Printing. p. 73. ISBN 0945274491, Book (par view)

- Buel, Richard, Jr. (1998). In Irons: Britain's Naval Supremacy and the American Revolutionary Economy,

Yale University Press,. p. 416. ISBN 0300073887, Book

- Clark, William Bell (1949). Captain Dauntless: The Story of Nicholas Biddle of the Continental Navy,

Louisiana State University Press, p. 319, Book (no view)

- —— (1956). Ben Franklin's Privateers: A Naval Epic of the American Revolution
  State Univ. Press, Baton Rouge: Louisiana, p. 198, Book (snippit view)
- —— (1960) George Washington's Navy: Being an Account of His Excellency's Fleet in New England Waters
  Louisiana State Univ. Press, Baton Rouge, p. 275. Book (snippit view)
- Coggins, Jack (2002.) Ships and Seamen of the American Revolution: Vessels, Crews, Weapons, Gear, Naval Tactics, and Actions of the War for Independence,

Courier Dover Publications. p. 224, ISBN 0486420728, Book (par view)

- Eastman, Ralph M. (2004). Some Famous Privateers of New England,

Kessinger Publishing, LLC. p. 96, ISBN 1-4179-0676-6, Book

- Gough, John Francis (1946). Admiral de Grasse and American Independence,

Indiana University Press, p. 45, Book

- Field, Edward (1898). Esek Hopkins, commander-in-chief of the continental navy during the American Revolution, 1775 to 1778: master mariner, politician, brigadier general, naval officer and philanthropist,

Preston & Rounds Co., Providence. p. 280, E'book

- Fowler, William M. (1976) (Note: Other works by William M. Fowler: 1976:Rebels Under Sail: The Navy in the Revolution 1990:Under Two Flags: The Navy in the Civil War 1995:Silas Talbot Captain of the Old Ironsides 1998:America and The Sea: A Maritime History) Rebels under sail: the American Navy during the Revolution

Charles Scribner and Sons, New York, p. 356, ISBN 9780684145839, Book

- Fredriksen, John C. (2006). Revolutionary War Almanac,

Infobase Publishing, p. 762, Url

- Hattendorf, John B. (N) (2011). The Formation and Roles of the Continental Navy, 1775–1785, in Talking About Naval History: A Collection of Essays,

Naval War College Press, Newport, p. 354. ISBN 9781884733741, Url

- Jackson, John W. (1974). The Pennsylvania Navy, 1775–1781: The Defense of the Delaware
  Rutgers Univ. Press, New Brunswick, p. 514 ISBN 9780813507668, Url
- James, Hartwell (1899). Military heroes of the United States from Lexington to Santiago,

Henry Altemus Co., Philadelphia. p. 218, E'book

- James, William Milbourne (1926). The British Navy in Adversity: A Study of the War of American Independence,

Longmans, Green and Co., Ltd, London, p. 459, Url

- Jennings, John (1966). Tattered Ensign The Story of America's Most Famous Fighting Frigate, U.S.S. Constitution,

Thomas Y. Crowell, New York, p. 290, OCLC 1291484

- Knox, Dudley Wright (1932). The Naval Genius of George Washington,

Houghton Mifflin, Boston, p. 135, Ebook

- Lardas, Mark (2012). Ships of the American Revolutionary Navy,

Osprey Publishing. p. 161. ISBN 1780963475, Url

- Lenge, Edward G. l (2012). A Companion to George Washington,

John Wiley & Sons, UK. p. 640. ISBN 1118219929, Url

- Lewis, Charles Lee (1945). Admiral de Grasse and American Independence,
  United States Naval Institute, Annapolis, p. 404, Url
- Lundeberg, Philip K. (1966). The Continental Gunboat Philadelphia and the Northern Campaign of 1776
  Smithsonian Institution, Washington. Url
- Lynch, Barbara A. (1976). The war at sea: France and the American Revolution : a bibliography
  Naval History Division, Dept. of the Navy, p. 48, Url
- Maclay, Edgar S. (1899). A History of American Privateers
  D. Appleton and Company, New York, p. 519, E'book
- Mahan, Alfred Thayer (N) (1913). The Major Operations of the Navies in the War of American Independence (Note: Other Works by Alfred Thayer Mahan 1883:The gulf and inland waters, Volume 3 1890:The Influence of Sea Power upon History 1892:Admiral Farragut 1899:Lessons of the war with Spain: and other articles 1905:Sea power in its relations to the War of 1812, Volume 1 1907:From Sail to Steam:Reflections of a Naval Life 1913:The Major Operations of the Navies in the War of American Independence)

Little Brown & Co., Boston, p. 280, E'Book

- McKee, Christopher (1991). A Gentlemanly and Honorable Profession: The Creation of the U.S. Naval Officer Corps, 1794–1815,

Naval Institute Press, p. 600, ISBN 978-0870212833, Url

- McManemin, John A. (1981). Captains of the Continental Navy,

Ho-Ho-Kus Publishing Company. p. 576, Url

- Middlebrook, Louis F. (1925). History of Maritime Connecticut During the American Revolution, 1775–1783, 2 vols.
  Essex Institute, Salem, Mass, p. 631 Vol.1, Vol.2
- Miller, Nathan (1974) Sea of glory: the Continental Navy fights for independence, 1775–1783,

D. McKay Co.; Original from Univ Michigan. p. 558 Url

- —— (1997). The U.S. Navy: A History (3rd ed.),

Naval Institute Press, Annapolis, MD ISBN 1-55750-595-0. OCLC 37211290, Url

- Morgan, William James (1959). Captains to the northward: the New England captains in the Continental Navy,

Barre Gazette; Original from Univ. Michigan press. p. 260 Url

- Paullin, Charles Oscar, (1906). The navy of the American Revolution: its administration, its policy and its achievements,

The Burrows Brothers Co. / Republican Printing Co., Iowa. p. 549 E'book

- Phillips, Donald T. (2010). On the Wing of Speed: George Washington and the Battle of Yorktown,

Published by author, p. 282, ISBN 9780982848425, Url

- Silverstone, Paul (2012). The Sailing Navy, 1775–1854,

CRC Press, p. 112, ISBN 0415978726, Url

- Smith, Philip Chadwick Foster (1976). Captain Samuel Tucker (1747–1833), Continental Navy

Essex Institute, p. 115 Book (snippit view)

- Stewart, Robert Armistead, (1934). The History of Virginia's Navy of the Revolution
  Mitchell & Hotchkiss, Printers, p. 279, Url
- Stoddard, William Osborn (1900). The Noank's log: a privateer of the revolution

Lothrop Publishing Co., Boston, p. 337, Url

- Stout, Neil R. (1962). The Royal Navy in American Waters, 1760–1775, Volume 2
  University of Wisconsin–Madison, p. 888, Url
- —— (1973). The Royal Navy in America, 1760–1775: A Study of Enforcement of British Colonial Policy in the Era of the American Revolution
  Naval Institute Press, Annapolis. p. 227, Url
- Sutherland, Jonathan, (2005). African Americans at War: An Encyclopedia,

ABC-CLIO, p. 819, ISBN 9781576077467, Url

- Volo, James M. (2008). Blue Water Patriots: The American Revolution Afloat,

Rowman & Littlefield. p. 312. ISBN 0742561208 Url

Top

=== John Paul Jones ===
- Abbott, John S.C. (2009). Life of John Paul Jones, (Note: Originally published in 1898)

Applewood Books, MA., 367 pages, ISBN 978-1-4290-2117-3, Book (par view)

- Barnes, John Sanford, (1911). The Logs of the Serapis – Alliance – Ariel, Under the Command of John Paul Jones, 1779–1780:... (Note: ... With Extracts from Public Documents, Unpublished Letters, and Narratives, and Illustrated with Reproductions of Scarce Prints)
  Printed for Naval Historical Society by De Vinne press, New York, 138 pages, E'book
- Boudriot, Jean (1987). John Paul Jones and the Bonhomme Richard: A Reconstruction of the Ship and an Account of the Battle With H.M.S. Serapis (Note: Translated by David H. Roberts.)
  Naval Institute Press, Annapolis, 127 pages, Book (snippit view)
- Brady, Cyrus Townsend (1906). Commodore Paul Jones,

D. Appleton and Co., New York; original from Univ. California, 482 pages, E'book

- Brown, Charles Walter (1902). John Paul Jones of naval fame: a character of the revolution,

M. A. Donohue & co., 271 pages, E'book

- Bruce, Wallace (2002). John Paul Jones: Father of the United States Navy,

Writer's Club Press, NE., 304 pages, ISBN 0-595-24232-4, Book (par view)

- Callo, Joseph (2011). John Paul Jones: America's First Sea Warrior,

Naval Institute Press. 289 pages, Book (par view)

- Cooper, James Fenimore, (1843). John Paul Jones,

G.R. Graham, 29 pages, Book (no view)

- De Koven, Regin, (2006). (Note: Original printing by Charles Scribner, New York, 1913) The Life And Letters Of John Paul Jones, V1,

Kessinger Publishing, 520 pages, ISBN 1428601759, Url

- Feld, Jonathan (2017). John Paul Jones's Locker: The Mutinous Men of the Continental Ship Ranger and the Confinement of Lieutenant Thomas Simpson, Naval History and Heritage Command, 36 pages. ISBN 978-1-943604-22-7,
- Fink, Leo Gregory (1962). Barry or Jones, "Father of the United States Navy"; Historical Reconnaissance,

Jefferies & Manz, Inc, Philadelphia, 554 pages, Url

- Haugen, Brenda (2005). John Paul Jones: Father Of The American Navy,

Capstone / Compass Point Books, 112 pages. ISBN 0-7565-0829-0, Url

- Johnson, Gerald W. (2005). The First Captain: The Story of John Paul Jones, (Note: First published in 1947)

Kessinger Publishing, 320 pages, Url

- Jones, John Paul; Taylor, Janette (1890). (P) Life and correspondence of John Paul Jones: including his narrative of the campaign of the Liman,

D. Fanshaw, New York, 555 pages, Url

- Jones, John Paul; Charles henry Lincoln, Ph.D. (Ed),( 1903) A calendar of John Paul Jones manuscripts in the Library of Congress
  Library of Congress; Manuscript Division, Govt. Print. Office, Washington, 316 pages, E'book
- Lardas, Mark (2012). Bonhomme Richard vs Serapis: Flamborough Head 1779,

Osprey Publishing, 80 pages, ISBN 178096448X, Url

- Library of Congress, Manuscript Division (1903). A calendar of John Paul Jones manuscripts in the Library of Congress,

Government Printing Office, DC., 316 pages, E'book

- Morison, Samuel Eliot (N) (1999). John Paul Jones: A Sailor's Biography,

Naval Institute Press, 534 pages, ISBN 1557504105, Url

- Russell, Phillips (1927). John Paul Jones: Man of Action, (Note: First published in 1927)
  Simon & Schuster, New York, 348 pages, ISBN 0-7432-0583-9, Url
- Saunders, Robert L. (2009). John Paul Jones: Finding the Forgotten Patriot,

Robert L. Saunders. 250 pages, ISBN 9781439236772, Url

- Seawewll, Milly Elliot, (1893). Paul Jones,

Appleton & Co., New York, 166 pages, Url

- Seitz, Don Carlos, (1917). Paul Jones: his exploits in English seas during 1778–1780, (Note: contemporary accounts collected from English newspapers, with a complete bibliography)

E.P. Dutton and Company, New York, 327 pages, Url1

- Sherburne, John Henry (1825). The Life of Paul Jones: From Original Documents in the Possession of John Henry Sherburne,
  John Murray, London, p. 320, E'book
- —— (1851). The life and character of John Paul Jones: a captain in the United States navy. During the revolutionary war,

Adriance, Sherman & co., New York. p. 408, Url

- Sperry, Armstrong (1953). John Paul Jones: fighting sailor
  Random House, p. 180, Url
- Thomas, Evan (2004). John Paul Jones: Sailor, Hero, Father of the American Navy,

Simon & Schuster, New York. p. 400, ISBN 0-7432-0583-9, Url

- Thomson, Valentine (1942) John Paul Jones: father of the American navy
  World Publishers, p. 608, Url
Top

=== John Barry ===
- Clark, William Bell (1938). Gallant John Barry 1745 1803 The Story Of A Naval Hero Of Two Wars,

The Macmillan Company, New York. p. 554, E'book Book (par view (Note: Other works by William Bell Clark 1932: Lambert Wickes, Sea Raider and Diplomat:) The Story of a Naval Captain of the Revolution 1949: Captain Dauntless: The Story of Nicholas Biddle of the Continental Navy 1956: Ben Franklin's Privateers: A Naval Epic of the American Revolution 1960: George Washington's Navy: Being an Account of His Excellency's Fleet in New England Waters)

- Cooper, James Fenimore (1843). John Paul Jones,

G.R. Graham, p. 29, Book (no view)

- Fink, Leo Gregory (1962). Barry or Jones, "Father of the United States Navy"; Historical Reconnaissance,

Jefferies & Manz, Inc, Philadelphia. p. 138, Url

- Griffin, Martin Ignatius, Joseph (1897). The history of Commodore John Barry,

Published by the Author, Philadelphia. p. 261, E'book

- ——, Martin I J (2012). The Story of Commodore John Barry,

Tredition Classics. p. 112, ISBN 3847215655, Url

- Gurn, Joseph (1933). Commodore John Barry: father of the American navy,

P.J. Kennedy & Sons. p. 318, Url

- —— (1903). Commodore John Barry: "the father of the American navy",

Published by the Author, Philadelphia. p. 424, E'book

- McGrath, Tim (2010). John Barry: An American Hero in the Age of Sail,

AuthorHouse, IN., p. 704, ISBN 1594161046, Url

- Meany, William Barry (1911). Commodore John Barry, the father of the American navy: a survey of extraordinary episodes in his naval career,

Harper & Brothers, New York, London. p. 74, Url

- Wibberley, Leonard (1957). John Barry: father of the Navy,

Ariel Books. p. 157, Url

- Williams, Thomas (2008). America's First Flag Officer: Father of the American Navy,

AuthorHouse, IN. p. 260, ISBN 978-1-4343-8654-0, Url

~

=== Richard Dale ===
- Brady, Cyrus Townsend (1906). Commodore Paul Jones,

D. Appleton and Co., New York; original from Univ. California. p. 482, E'book

- Cooper, James Fenimore (1842). Richard Dale,

Publisher (1842). p. 297, Book (no view)

- —— (1856). History of the navy of the United States of America,

Stringer & Townsend, New York. p. 508. OCLC 197401914, E'book

- —— (1864).History of the Navy of the United States of America: Continued to 1860 ..., Volumes 1-3
  Blakeman & Mason, p. 634, E'book
- Fink, Leo Gregory (1962). Barry or Jones, "Father of the United States Navy"; Historical Reconnaissance,

Jefferies & Manz, Inc, Philadelphia. p. 554, Url

- McKee, Christopher (1972). Edward Preble: a naval biography, 1761–1807,

United States Naval Institute, Annapolis, Maryland. p. 436, ISBN 0-87021-525-6, Url

- Morris, Charles (1907). Heroes of the navy in America,

J.B. Lippincott company, Philadelphia and London, p. 312, Url

- Peterson, Charles Jacobs (1857). The American navy: being an authentic history of the United States navy ...

Jas. B. Smith & Co, Philadelphia. p. 545, Url

- Russell, Phillips (2004). John Paul Jones: Man of Action

Simon and Schuster, New York. p. 348. ISBN 0-7432-0583-9, Url

- Sears, Robert (1855). The remarkable adventures of celebrated persons: ..., etc., eminent in the history of Europe and America,

Robert Sears, New York, p. 410, Url

- Smith, Myron J. (1973). Navies in the American Revolution: a bibliography
  Scarecrow Press p. 219, Url
- Seawell, Molly Elliot (1897). Twelve naval captains: being a record of certain Americans who made themselves immortal,

Kegan, Paul, Trench, Trubner, & Co. Ltd, ltd., London, p. 233, Url

- Sweetman, Jack (2002). American Naval History: An Illustrated Chronology of the U.S. Navy and Marine Corps, 1775–present,

Naval Institute Press, Annapolis, MD:. ISBN 1-55750-867-4. Url

- Thomas, Evan (2004). John Paul Jones: Sailor, Hero, Father of the American Navy ,

Simon and Schuster, New York, p. 400, ISBN 0-7432-0583-9. Url

Other sources for Richard Dale can be found in bibliographies for:

John Paul Jones ~ John Barry ~ Stephen Decatur ~ Edward Preble

~

=== Thomas Truxtun ~ Silas Talbot ===
- Cooper, James Fenimore (1856). History of the Navy of the United States of America,

Stringer & Townsend, New York. p. 508. OCLC 197401914, E'book

- Eastman, Ralph M. (2004). Some Famous Privateers of New England,

Kessinger Publishing, p. 96, ISBN 9781417906765, Book (no view)

- Ferguson, Eugene S (1956). Truxtun of the Constellation: The Life of Commodore Thomas Truxtun, U.S. Navy, 1755–1822

Johns Hopkins University Press, p. 322, ISBN 0801865972, E'Book

- Fowler, William M. (1995), Silas Talbot: Captain of Old Ironsides

Mystic Seaport Museum, p. 231, ISBN 9780913372739, Book (snippit view)

- Grant, Bruce (1960). Captain of the Constellation: Commodore Thomas Truxtun

Putnam, New York p. 123, Book (snippit view)

- Loubat, Joseph Florimond (1881). The medallic history of the United States of America, 1776–1876, Volume 1

Published by author/Loubat, New York. p. 488, E'book

- McKee, Christopher (1991). A Gentlemanly and Honorable Profession: The Creation of the U.S. Naval Officer Corps, 1794–1815

Naval Institute Press, p. 600, ISBN 9780870212833, Book (par view)

- Schultz, Charles R. (1965). P : Inventory of the Silas Talbot Papers, 1767–1867,

Marine Historical Association, p.86, Url

- Statham, Edward Phillips (1910). Privateers and privateering. With eight illustrations,

Hutchinson & co / James Pott & Co., New York, p. 382, E'book

- Truxtun, Thomas (1809). P : Biographical Memoirs of Thomas Truxtun, ESQ. from the Port Folio,

Bradford & Inskeep, Book (no view)

- Tuckerman, Henry, (2009), The Life of Silas Talbot

Applewood Books, Bedford, Mass., p. 148, ISBN 9781429021593, Book (par view)

Other sources for Thomas Truxtun and Silas Talbot can be found in bibliographies for:
Stephen Decatur ~ Edward Preble ~ Richard Dale
Top

== Jefferson / Madison era ==
- Adams, Henry, (1889). P : History of the United States of America, Volume 1,

Charles Scribner's Sons, New York, 451 pages, E'book

- —— (1890). History of the United States of America during the second administration of Thomas Jefferson, Volume 4,

Charles Scribner's Sons, New York, p. 502, E'book

- —— (1891), [1962]. History of the United States of America, Volume 9,

Charles Scribner's Sons, New York; Reprint: Antiquarian Press, 370 pages, E'book

- Canney, Donald L. (2001). Sailing warships of the US Navy,

Chatham Publishing / Naval Institute Press, 224 pages, ISBN 1-55750-990-5, Book (par view)

- Channing, Edward, (2004). The Jeffersonian System 1801 To 1811,

Kessinger Publishing. 324 pages, ISBN 1417974850, Book (no view)

- Dye, Ira (2006). Uriah Levy: Reformer of the Antebellum Navy
  University Press of Florida, 299 pages, ISBN 0-8130-3004-8, Book (no view)
- Foote, Andrew Hull, (1855). P : African Squadron,

William F. Geddes, printer, Philadelphia, 15 pages, E'book

- Fremont-Barnes, Gregory (2006). The Wars of the Barbary Pirates: To the Shores of Tripoli – The Rise of the Us Navy and Marines, Osprey Publishing, 95 pages; ISBN 9781846030307; Book
- Guttridge, Leonard F.Smith, Jay D., (1969). The commodores

Harper & Row, Original Univ. Michigan, 340 pages, Book (snippit view)

- Hattendorf, John, B., (2011). Talking about Naval History: A Collection of Essays

Government Printing Office, 254 pages, ISBN 9781884733741, Book (par view)

- Isenberg, Nancy; Burstein, Andrew, (2001). Madison and Jefferson,

Random House Digital, Inc., 848 pages, ISBN 978-1-4000-6757-2, Url

- Jefferson, Thomas, (1905). Ford, Paul Leicester. ed. P : The works of Thomas Jefferson,

G.P. Putnam's Sons, New York & London. 532 pages, E'book

- Ketcham, Ralph Louis (1971). James Madison: A Biography,

University Press of Virginia. 751 pages, ISBN 0-8139-1265-2, Book

- Leiner, Frederick C. (2000). Millions for defense: the subscription warships of 1798, Naval Institute Press, 262 pages; Book
- Mapp, Alf J. (2009). Thomas Jefferson: Passionate Pilgrim, The Presidency, The Founding of the University, and the Private Battle,

Rowman & Littlefield, Maryland, 445 pages, ISBN 978-0819180537, Book

- Mattern, David B., (2005). James Madison: patriot, politician, and president,

ABC-CLIO. 112 pages, Book

- McCullough, David, (2005). 1776,

Simon, Schuster, New York, N.Y., 400 pages, ISBN 978-0-7432-2671-4, Book

- Merwin, Henry Childs, (1901). Thomas Jefferson,

Houghton, Mifflin, 164 pages; E'book

- Nash, Howard P. (1968). The Forgotten Wars: The Role of the U.S. Navy in the Quasi War With France and the Barbary Wars, 1798–1805
  A. S. Barnes, New York, 308 pages; Book
- Ohls, Gary J., (2008). Roots of Tradition: Amphibious Warfare in the Early American Republic,

ProQuest, 372 pages, ISBN 9780549501442, Book

- Palmer, Michael A. (1987). Stoddert's War: Naval Operations During the Quasi-War With France, 1798–1801
  Univ. of South Carolina Press, Columbia, 313 pages, Book
- Peterson, Merrill D. (1986). Thomas Jefferson and the New Nation,

Oxford University Press,548 pages, ISBN 0-8139-1851-0, Book

- Randall, Willard Sterne, (1994). Thomas Jefferson: A Life,

Harper Collins, 736 pages, ISBN 0-06-097617-9, Book

- Rayner, B. L., (1832). Sketches of the life, writings, and opinions of Thomas Jefferson: With selections of the most valuable portions of his voluminous and unrivaled private correspondence,

A. Francis and W. Boardman, New York, 556 pages, E'book

- Richardson, James D., (2004). P : Thomas Jefferson: A Compilation of the Messages and Papers of the Presidents

Kessinger Publishing, 184 pages, ISBN 9781419100673, Url

- Safire, William, (2008). Safire's Political Dictionary,

Oxford University Press, p.862, ISBN 9780195343342, Book

- Smith, Gene A., (1995). "For the Purposes of Defense": The Politics of the Jeffersonian Gunboat Program,

University of Delaware Press, Newark, DE, 185 pages, ISBN 0-87413-559-1, Book

- Symonds, Craig L.;Clipson, William J. (2009). The Naval Institute Historical Atlas of the U.S. Navy,

Naval Institute Press, 1101 pages, ISBN 978-1-55750-984-0, Book

- Tucker, George, (1837). The life of Thomas Jefferson, third president of the United States: ..., (Note: ... with parts of his correspondence never before published, and notices of his opinions on questions of civil government, national policy, and constitutional law)

Charles Knight, London, 587 pages, E'book

- Tucker, Spencer C., (1993). The Jeffersonian Gunboat Navy (Note: List of works by Spencer C. Tucker : 1988:Arming the Fleet. U.S. Ordnance in the Muzzle-Loading Era; 1993:The Jeffersonian gunboat navy; 1996:Injured honor: the Chesapeake-Leopard Affair, June 22, 1807; 1997:The Confederate Navy in Europe; 2001:A Short History of the Civil War at Sea; 2004:Stephen Decatur: a life most bold and daring; 2006:Blue & gray navies: the Civil War afloat; 2009:The Encyclopedia of the Spanish-American and Philippine-American Wars: Vol.1; 2010:The Civil War Naval Encyclopedia, Volume 1; 2012:The Encyclopedia of the War of 1812)

University of South Carolina Press, 265 pages, ISBN 9780872498495, Book

- ——; Reuter, Frank Theodore, (1996). The Jeffersonian gunboat navy . Injured honor: the Chesapeake-Leopard Affair, June 22, 1807,

Naval Institute Press, 268 pages, ISBN 1557508240, Book

- Wills, Garry, (2002). James Madison: The American Presidents Series: The 4th President, 1809–1817

Times Books, New York, 208 pages, ISBN 0-8050-6905-4, Book

- Zacks, Richard, (2005). The Pirate Coast: Thomas Jefferson, the First Marines, and the Secret Mission of 1805,

Hyperion, 448 pages, ISBN 9781401383114, Book (snippet view)

~

=== Stephen Decatur ===
- Abbot, Willis John, (1886). The Naval History of the United States,

Peter Fenelon Collier, New York, 434 pages, E'book

- Allen, Gardner Weld, (1905). Our Navy and the Barbary Corsairs,

Houghton Mifflin & Co., Boston, New York & Chicago., 354 pages; E'book

- —— (1909). Our Naval War with France

Houghton Mifflin & Co., Boston, New York and Chicago, 323 pages; E'book

- Allison, Robert J. (2005). Stephen Decatur American Naval Hero, 1779–1820,

University of Massachusetts Press, 253 pages, ISBN 1-55849-492-8, Book (par view)

- Anthony, Irvin, (1931). Decatur,

Charles Scribner & Sons, New York, 319 pages; Book (snippit view)

- Birindelli, Ben (1998). The 200 year legacy of Stephen Decatur, 1798–1998
  Hallmark Pub, 216 pages; ISBN 9780965375948; Book (snippit view)
- Borneman, Walter R. (2004). 1812: The War that Forged a Nation,

Harper Collins, New York, 349 pages, ISBN 0-06-053112-6, Book (par view)

- Bradford, James C. (1997). Quarterdeck and Bridge: Two Centuries of American Naval Leaders,

Naval Institute Press, 455 pages; ISBN 1-55750-073-8; Book (par view)

- Brady, Cyrus Townsend (1900). Stephen Decatur,

Small, Maynard & Company, (original, Harvard Univ.), 142 pages; Book (no view)

- —— (2006). Stephen Decatur,

Kessinger Publishing (reprint), 168 pages; ISBN 1428603115; Book (no view)

- Canney, Donald L. (2001). Sailing Warships of the US Navy,

Chatham Publishing / Naval Institute Press, 224 pages; ISBN 1-55750-990-5; Book (par view)

- Cooper, James Fenimore (1856). History of the Navy of the United States of America,

Stringer & Townsend, New York, 508 pages; OCLC = 197401914; E'book

- —— (1846). Lives of distinguished American naval officers,

Carey and Hart, Philadelphia. 436 pages; OCLC = 620356; E'book1 E'book2

- Decatur, Stephen; Barron, James (1820). P : CORRESPONDENCE, BETWEEN THE LATE COMMODORE STEPHEN DECATUR AND COMMODORE JAMES BARRON ...,

Russell & Gardner, Boston, 22 pages; E'book1, E'book2

- De Kay, James T. De Kay, (2004), A Rage for Glory: The Life of Commodore Stephen Decatur, USN,
  Simon and Schuster, New York, 297 pages; ISBN 9780743242455; Book (par view)
- Gleaves, Albert, (1904). James Lawrence, captain, United States Navy: commander of the "Chesapeake",

G.P. Putnam's Sons, New York, London, 335 pages; E'book

- Guttridge, Leonard F. (2005). Our Country, Right Or Wrong: The Life of Stephen Decatur,

Tom Doherty Associates, LLC, New York, 304 pages; ISBN 978-0-7653-0702-6 Book (par view)

- Hagan, Kenneth J. (1992). This People's Navy: The Making of American Sea Power,

The Free Press, New York, 468 pages; ISBN 0-02-913471-4; Book (par view)

- Hale, Edward Everett (1896). Illustrious Americans, Their Lives and Great Achievements,

International Publishing Company, Philadelphia and Chicago, 756 pages' ISBN 978-1-162-22702-3; Url1, Url2

- Harris, Gardner W. (1837) The Life and Services of Commodore William Bainbridge, United States Navy

Carey Lea & Blanchard, New York, 254 pages; E'book

- Hickey, Donald R. (1989). The War of 1812, A Forgotten Conflict,

University of Illinois Press. Chicago and Urbana, ISBN 0-252-01613-0, E'book

- Hill, Frederic Stanhope (1905). Twenty-six Historic Ships,

G.P. Putnam's Sons, New York & London, 515 pages; E'book

- Hollis, Ira N. (1900). The Frigate Constitution the Central Figure of the Navy Under Sail,

Houghton, Mifflin and Company, Boston and New York; The Riverside Press, Cambridge,455 pages; [* Hollis, Ira N. (1900). The Frigate Constitution; The Central Figure of the Navy Under Sail. Boston, New York: Houghton Mifflin. OCLC 2350400. E'book]

- Kimball, Horace (1858). The Naval Battles of the United States in the Different Wars with Foreign Nations, from the Commencement of the Revolution to the Present Time: Including Privateering
  Higgins, Bradley and Dayton, Boston, 278 pages; E'book
- Lambert, Andrew (2012). The Challenge. Britain against America in the Naval War of 1812,

Faber and Faber, London, Url

- Lardas, Mark. (2011). Decatur's Bold and Daring Act, The 'Philadelphia' in Tripoli 1804. Osprey Raid Series #22.
  Osprey Publishing, 80 pages; ISBN 978-1-84908-374-4; Book (par view)
- Leiner, Frederic C. (2007). The End of Barbary Terror, America's 1815 War Against the Pirates of North Africa,

Oxford University Press, 240 pages; ISBN 978-0-19-532540-9; Book (par view)

- Lewis, Charles Lee, (1924). Famous American Naval Officers,

L.C.Page & Company, Inc., 444 pages; ISBN 0-8369-2170-4; E'book

- —— (1937). The Romantic Decatur,

Ayer Publishing, 296 pages; ISBN 0-8369-5898-5; Book (no view)

- London, Joshua, (2005). Victory in Tripoli: How America's War with the Barbary Pirates Established the U.S. Navy and Shaped a Nation,

John Wiley & Sons, 288 pages; ISBN 0471444154; Book (par view)

- Mackenzie, Alexander Slidell, (1846). Life of Stephen Decatur: A Commodore in the Navy of the United States,

C. C. Little and J. Brown. p. 443. E'book

- Macdonough, Rodney (1909). Life of Commodore Thomas Macdonough,

U.S. Navy, Boston, MA: The Fort Hill Press. p. 303 E'book

- Maclay, Edgar Stanton (1894). A History of the United States Navy, from 1775 to 1893,

D. Appleton & Company, New York. p. 647 E'book

- Morris, Charles (1907). Heroes of the navy in America,

J.B. Lippincott company, Philadelphia and London. p. 312 E'book

- Panzac, Daniel (2005), The Barbary Corsairs: The End of a Legend, 1800–1820,
  K. Brill, Netherlands, p. 352, ISBN 9789004125940, Url
- Roosevelt, Theodore (1882). The Naval War of 1812,

G.P. Putnam's Sons, New York. p. 541. E'book

- Seawell, Molly Elliot (1908.) Decatur and Somers,

D.Appleton and Company, New York, p. 178, E'book

- Shaler, William; American Consul General at Algiers (1826). Sketches of Algiers

Cummings, Hillard and Company, Boston. p. 296. E'book

- Smethurst, David (2009). Tripoli: The United States' First War on Terror,
  Random House LLC, p. 320, ISBN 9780307548283, Book (par view)
- Smith, Charles Henry (1900). Stephen Decatur and the suppression of piracy in the Mediterranean: ..., (Note: an address at a meeting of the Connecticut society of the Order of the founders and patriots of America, April 19, A.D. 1900)

Tuttle, Morehouse & Taylor, New Haven. p. 38 E'book

- Toll, Ian W. (2006) Six Frigates: The Epic History of the Founding of the U.S. Navy,

W. W. Norton & Company, New York. p. 592. ISBN 978-0-393-05847-5 Url

- Tucker, Spencer (2004) Stephen Decatur: A Life Most Bold and Daring,

Naval Institute Press, Annapolis, MD. p. 245. ISBN 1-55750-999-9 Book (par view)

- —— (2012) The Encyclopedia Of the War Of 1812,

ABC-CLIO, 1034 pages; Url

- Waldo, Samuel Putnam (1821) The Life and Character of Stephen Decatur,

P. B. Goodsell, Hartford, Conn., 312 pages. E'book

- Whipple, Addison Beecher Colvin (2001). To the Shores of Tripoli: The Birth of the U.S. Navy and Marines,

Naval Institute Press, 357 pages; ISBN 1-55750-966-2; Url

Other sources for Stephen Decatur can be found in bibliographies for :
General Naval history ~ War of 1812 ~ Edward Preble
Top

=== Thomas Macdonough ===
- Skaggs, David Curtis (2003). Thomas Macdonough: Master of command in the early U.S. Navy,

Naval Institute Press, Annapolis, MD. p. 257. ISBN 1-55750-839-9, Url

- MacDonough, Rodney (1909). Life of Commodore Thomas Macdonough, U. S. Navy,

The Fort Hill press, Boston, Mass, p. 303, E'Book

- Mahon, John H. (1972). The War of 1812

Da Capo Press, in arrangement with University of Florida Press, 1972, p. 496. ISBN 0-306-80429-8, Url

- Frost, John (1845). The pictorial book of the commodores: comprising lives of distinguished commanders in the navy of the United States

Nafis and Cornish, New York. p. 432, ISBN 1-55750-839-9, E'Book

- Holden, James A. (1914). The Centenary of the Battle of Plattsburg,

Univ. New York, Albany, NY, p.97, E'Book

Other sources for Thomas Macdonough can be found in bibliographies for:
Stephen Decatur ~ War of 1812
~

=== John Rodgers ===
- Allen, By Gardner Weld (1909). Our naval war with France. Houghton Mifflin,

Boston, New York. p. 323, OCLC = 197401914, E'Book

- Cooper, James Fenimore (1826) History of the navy of the United States of America,

Stringer & Townsend, New York. p. 508, OCLC = 197401914, Url

- McKee, Christopher (1972). Edward Preble: a naval biography, 1761–1807,

United States Naval Institute, Annapolis, Maryland. p. 436, ISBN 0-87021-525-6, Book

- Paullin, Charles Oscar (1910). Commodore John Rodgers: Captain ...,

The Arthur H. Clark Company, Cleveland, Ohio. p. 434, E'book

- —— (1968). Paullin's history of naval administration, 1775–1911: a collection of articles from the U.S. Naval Institute Proceedings,

Annapolis MD: Naval Institute Press. p. 485, Book

- Schroeder, John H., (2006), Commodore John Rodgers: Paragon of the Early American Navy,

University Press of Florida, p. 255, ISBN 0813029635, Url

- Skaggs, David Curtis (2006). Oliver Hazard Perry: honor, courage, and patriotism in the early U.S. Navy

Naval Institute Press. p. 302, ISBN 1-59114-792-1 Url

Other sources for John Rodgers can be found in bibliographies for
Stephen Decatur ~ War of 1812 ~ Edward Preble
~

=== Charles Stewart ===
- Allison, Robert J. (2005). Stephen Decatur American Naval Hero, 1779–1820

University of Massachusetts Press., p. 253, ISBN 1-55849-492-8 Book (par view)

- Berube, Claude G.; Rodgaard, John A. (2005). A Call To The Sea: Captain Charles Stewart Of The USS Constitution,

Potomac Books, Inc.. p. 301. ISBN 1574885189 Book (par view)

- Brodine, Charles E., Jr.; Crawford, Michael J.; Hughes, Christine F. (2007). Ironsides! The Ship, the Men and the Wars of the USS Constitution. Fireship Press. p. 286. ISBN 978-1-934757-14-7 Book (par view)
- Humphreys, Asheton Y.; Martin, Tyrone G., (N), (2000). P : The USS Constitution's finest fight, 1815: the journal of Acting Chaplain Assheton Humphreys, US Navy,

Nautical & Aviation Pub. Co. of America. p. 103 Book (snippit view)

- Ignatius, Martin; Griffin, Joseph (1897). The history of Commodore John Barry,

Published by the Author, Philadelphia. p. 261 E'book

- Martin, Tyrone G. (2003). A Most Fortunate Ship: A Narrative History of Old Ironsides,

Naval Institute Press. p. 421. ISBN 1591145139 Book (snippit view)

- Tucker, Spencer C. (2004). Stephen Decatur: a life most bold and daring,

Naval Institute Press, 2004 Annapolis, MD. p. 245. ISBN 1-55750-999-9 Book (par view)

- Whipple, Addison Beecher Colvin (2001). To the Shores of Tripoli: the birth of the U.S. Navy and Marines,

Naval Institute Press, 2001. p. 296. ISBN 1-55750-966-2 Book (par view)

- Rakestraw, J. (1851). An exposition of the African slave trade: from the year 1840, to 1850, inclusive, Volume 2.,

Philadelphia Yearly Meeting of the Religious Society of Friends, ed., p. 160 E'book

Other sources for Charles Stewart can be found at:
bibliography for Stephen Decatur
~

=== Edward Preble ===
- Loubat, Joseph Florimond (1881), The medallic history of the United States of America, 1776–1876,

Published by the author, p. 448, E'book

- McBride, James, (1815), Naval biography: consisting of memoirs of the most distinguished officers of the American navy; to which is annexed the life of General Pike,

Morgan, Williams & co., Cincinnati, p. 296, E'book

- McKee, Christopher (1972). Edward Preble: a naval biography, 1761–1807.

United States Naval Institute, Annapolis, Maryland. p. 436, ISBN 0-87021-525-6, Book (par view)

- Pratt, Fletcher (1950). Preble's boys: Commodore Preble and the birth of American sea power,

Sloane; original: Univ. Michigan. p. 419, Book (snippit view)

- Preble, Edward, (1800), P : Edward Preble Memorandum Book and U.S. Navy Regulations, (Note: Memo book (1803–1805) kept by Commodore Edward Preble recording trip expenses to and from Portsmouth, N.H., and Boston; also lists gifts to foreign dignitaries and military officials. Includes printed booklet (1800) of U.S. Navy regulations.)

Archived material: Maine Historical Society, Portland, Me, Book (no view)

- Sabine, Lorenzo; Ellis, George E. (1847) Jared Sparks, editor Lives of Edward Preble and William Penn,

Little & Brown, Boston, p. 408, E'book

- Soley, James Russell (2010). Operations of the Mediterranean Squadron Under Commodore Edward Preble, In 1803–1804,

Kessinger Publishing. p. 54, ISBN 1168717752, Book (no view)

- Tucker, Glenn (1963). Dawn like thunder: the Barbary wars and the birth of the U. S. Navy,

Bobbs-Merrill; Original, Univ. Michigan, p. 487, Book (snippit view)

- Whipple, Addison Beecher Colvin (2001). To the Shores of Tripoli: The Birth of the U.S. Navy and Marines,

Naval Institute Press. p. 357, ISBN 1-55750-966-2, Book (par view)

Other sources for Edward Preble can be found at:
bibliography for Stephen Decatur
~

=== William Bainbridge ===
- Allison, Robert J. (2005). Stephen Decatur American Naval Hero, 1779–1820.
  University of Massachusetts Press. pp. 253. ISBN 1-55849-492-8. Url
- Barnes, James (1897). Commodore Bainbridge: from the gunroom to the quarter-deck,

D. Appleton and company. p. 168. ISBN 0945726589 Url

- Dearborn, Henry Alexander Scammell (2011). The Life of William Bainbridge, Esq of the United States Navy,

Kessinger Publishing,. p. 252 Url

- Harris, Thomas (1837). The life and services of Commodore William Bainbridge, United States Navy,

Carey Lea & Blanchard, Philadelphia. p. 254. ISBN 0945726589 E'Book

- Hickey, Donald R. (1989). The War of 1812, A Forgotten Conflict,

University of Illinois Press, Chicago and Urbana. ISBN 0-252-01613-0 Url

- Long, David Foster (1981). Ready to hazard: a biography of Commodore William Bainbridge, 1774–1833,

University Press of New England. p. 359. ISBN 083570579X Url

- Williams, Thomas (2010). The American Spirit: The Story of Commodore William Phillip Bainbridge,

AuthorHouse. p. 408. ISBN 144909564X Url

Other sources for William Bainbridge can be found at:

bibliography for Stephen Decatur

~

=== Isaac Hull ===
- Allen, Gardner Weld (2010). P : Commodore Hull: Papers of Isaac Hull, Commodore United States Navy,

Kessinger Publishing. p. 372. ISBN 978-1436683401 Url1 Url2

- Enz, David Fitz Enz (2009). Old Ironsides: Eagle of the Sea: The Story of the USS Constitution,

Taylor Trade Publications. p. 304. ISBN 1589794273 Url

- Grant, Bruce (1947). Isaac Hull, Captain of Old Ironsides: the life and fighting times of Isaac Hull and the U.S. frigate Constitution,

Pellegrini and Cudahy; Original from the University of Michigan. p. 416 Url

- Hollis, Ira N. (1900). The frigate Constitution the central figure of the Navy under sail,

Houghton, Mifflin and Company, Boston and New York; The Riverside Press, Cambridge. p. 263 E'Book

- Hull, Isaac, (N), (1929). P : Commodore Hull: papers of Isaac Hull, commodore, United States navy,

The Boston Athenaeum,. p. 341 Url

- Maloney, Linda M. (1986). The captain from Connecticut: the life and naval times of Isaac Hull,

Northeastern University Press. p. 549. ISBN 0930350790 Url

- Molloy, Leo Thomas (1964). Commodore Isaac Hull, U.S.N., his life and times,

Hull Book Fund. p. 244 Url

- Marquardt, Karl Heinz (2005). The 44-Gun Frigate USS Constitution: "Old Ironsides",

Naval Institute Press. p. 128. ISBN 1591142504 Url

- Martin, Tyrone G. (2003). A Most Fortunate Ship: A Narrative History of Old Ironsides,

Naval Institute Press. p. 421. ISBN 1591145139 Url

- Stevens, Benjamin F (2010). Isaac Hull and American Frigate Constitution,

BiblioBazaar (reprint). p. 24. ISBN 1172140669 Url

Other sources for Isaac Hull can be found at:
bibliography for Stephen Decatur
Top

== War of 1812 ==
- Barnes, James, (1896). Naval actions of the War of 1812 (Note: Other works by James Barnes : 1906: Yankee ships and Yankee sailors: Tales of 1812 1896: Naval actions of the War of 1812 1899: David G. Farragut 1912: The hero of Erie: Oliver Hazard Perry)

Harper & Brothers, New York, p. 263 E'book

- —— (1906). Yankee ships and Yankee sailors: tales of 1812

Macmillan, London. p. 281 E'book

- Budiansky, Stephen. (2012). Perilous Fight: America's Intrepid War with Britain on the High Seas, 1812–1815

Vintage Books, New York, p. 448 ISBN 978-0-307-45495-9 Book (par view)

- Burges, Tristam (2009). Battle of Lake Erie

Applewood Books, Bedford. p. 136, ISBN 978-1-4290-2055-8, Book (par view)

- Byron, Gilbert (1964). The War of 1812 on the Chesapeake Bay

Maryland Historical Society, Baltimore, p. 94, Book (snippit view)

- Collins, Mark, Taylor, David A.; Brinkley, Douglas (2012). The War of 1812 and the Rise of the U.S. Navy

Natnl Geographic Books, p. 280, ISBN 9781426209338, Book (snippit view)

- Coles, Harry, L. (1966). The War of 1812
  University of Chicago Press, p. 307, ISBN 9780226113500, Book (par view)
- Cranwell, John P., Crane, William B. (1940). Men of Marque: A History of Private Armed Vessels Out of Baltimore During the War of 1812,

Norton, New York, p. 413, Book (snippit view)

- Crawford, Michael J. (Ed) (2002). The Naval War of 1812: A Documentary History, Vol. 3
  Department of the Navy, Naval Historical Center, Washington, p. 920, ISBN 9780160512247, Book (no view)
- Cruikshank, E.A. (1924). The Contest for the Command of Lake Ontario in 1814,

Ontario Historical Society Papers and Records, XXI, p. 61, Book (no view)

- Daughan, George C. (2011). 1812: The Navy's War,

Basic Books, New York, p. 491, ISBN 9780465020461 Book (par view)

- Dickon, Chris (2008). The enduring journey of the USS Chesapeake: ...,

The Hickory Press, Charleston, SC. p. 157, ISBN 978-1-59629-298-7, Book (par view)

- Dudley, William S.; Crawford, Michael J. (1985). Naval War of 1812, A Documentary History,

Government Printing Office. p. 772, ISBN 0160020425 Book (par view)

- Dye, Ira: The Fatal Cruise of the Argus: Two Captains in the War of 1812
  Naval Institute Press, 1994, ISBN 1-55750-175-0 Book (par view)
- Eckert, Edward K. (1900), The Navy Department in the War of 1812
  University of Florida Press, p. 77, E'book
- Ellis, James H. (2009). A Ruinous and Unhappy War: New England and the War of 1812,

Algora Publishing, p. 315, ISBN 9780875866918, Book (par view)

- Forester, Cecil Scott (1956). The age of fighting sail: the story of the naval War of 1812,

Doubleday, New York, p. 284, Book (snippit view)

- Gay, Martin and Kathlyn, (1995). War of 1812,

Lerner Publications, p.65, ISBN 9780805028461, Book (par view)

- Greenblatt, Miriam; Bowman, John Stewart (2009). War of 1812,

Infobase Publishing, p. 166, ISBN 9781438100166, Book (par view)

- Harrison, Bird (1962). Navies in the Mountains: The Battles on the Waters of Lake Champlain and Lake George, 1609–1814,

Oxford University Press, p. 361, Book (snippit view)

- Healey, David (2005) 1812: Rediscovering Chesapeake Bay's Forgotten War
  Bella Rosa Books, p. 194, ISBN 9780974768526, Book (no view)
- Heidler, David Stephen (2004). Encyclopedia of the War of 1812,

Naval Institute Press, Annapolis, Md., p. 636, ISBN 1-59114-362-4 Url

- Hickey, Donald R. (1989). The War of 1812, A Forgotten Conflict,

University of Illinois Press, Chicago and Urbana, p. 467. ISBN 0-252-01613-0 Url

- —— (2006). Don't Give Up the Ship! Myths of the War of 1812,

Robin Brass Studio, Incorporated,. p. 430. ISBN 0-252-03179-2 Url

- Hitsman, J. Mackay. (1965). The Incredible War of 1812: A Military History
  Toronto: Univ. of Toronto Press, p. 265, Book (snippit view)
- Homans, Benjamin (1833). The Military and Naval Magazine of the United States, Volumes 1-2
  Thompson and Homans, Washington, p. 393, E'Book
- Ingersoll, Charles J. (1845). Historical sketch of the second war between the United States of America, and Great Britain,

Lea and Blanchard, Philadelphia. p. 496. ISBN 0-306-80429-8 E'Book

- —— (1852). History of the Second War and Great Britain Lippincott, Grambo & Co., Philadelphia, p. 406, Url
- James, William, (1816), Inquiry Into the Merits of the Principal Naval Actions, Between Great-Britain and the United States (Note: Other Works by William James: The Naval History of Great Britain Volumes 1-6)
  Anthony H. Holland, Halifax, N.S., p. 102, E'Book, Pdf, Open Library
- —— (1817). A full and correct account of the chief naval occurrences of the late war between Great Britain and the United States of America
  T. Egerton, Whitehall, London, p. 528, E'Book
- Jenkins, Mark Collins; Taylor, David; Brinkley, Douglas (2012). The War of 1812 and the Rise of the U.S. Navy,

Natnl Geographic Books, p. 280. ISBN 1426209339 Url

- Lambert, Andrew (2012).The Challenge: America Against Britain in the Naval War of 1812
  Faber & Faber Limited, London, p. 560, ISBN 9780571273195, Url
- Latimer, Jon (2004) 1812: War with America,

Harvard University Press, 2007. p. 637. ISBN 978-0-674-02584-4, Book (par view)

- Lossing, Benson John (1869). The Pictorial Field-book of the War of 1812:... (Note: Full title: The Pictorial Field-book of the War of 1812: Or, Illustrations, by Pen and Pencil, of the History, Biography, Scenery, Relics, and Traditions of the Last War for American Independence)
  Harper & Brothers, New York p. 1054, E'Book
- Mattern, David B. (2005) James Madison: patriot, politician, and president,

ABC-CLIO. p. 112 Url

- Mahan, Alfred Thayer (1905) Sea power in its relations to the War of 1812, Volume 1,

Little, Brown, and Company, Boston, p. 423, E'Book

- Mahon, John K. (1991) The War of 1812,

Da Capo Press, p. 476. ISBN 0-306-80429-8 Url

- Malcomson, Robert (1998) Lords of the Lake:The Naval War on Lake Ontario 1812–1814

Robin Brass Studio, Toronto, ISBN 1-896941-08-7, Url

- —— (2006). Historical dictionary of the War of 1812,

Scarecrow Press/Rowman & Littfield, Maryland, 1991. p. 701. ISBN 978-0819180537 Url

- —— (2008) Capital in Flames: The American Attack on York, 1813

Robin Brass Studio, Toronto, ISBN 1-896941-53-2

- Mills, James Cooke (1913). Oliver Hazard Perry and the battle of Lake Erie,

John Phelps, Detroit. p. 284 E'Book

- Nardo, Don, (1999). The War of 1812,

Lucent Books, p. 128, ISBN 9781560065814, Book (snippit view)

- Paine, Ralph Delahaye (2010) [1920]. The fight for a free sea: a chronicle of the War of 1812,

Yale University Press, New Haven, 1920. p. 235. ISBN 1-59114-362-4 Url

- Paullin, Charles Oscar (1918) The Battle of Lake Erie (a collection of documents, mainly those by Oliver Hazard Perry)

The Raufin Club, Cleveland, Ohio, p.222, E'Book

- Peterson, Charles Jacobs, (1852), The military heroes of the War of 1812: with a narrative of the war,

J.B. Smith and Co, Philadelphia, p.208, E'Book

- Roosevelt, Theodore, (1883). The naval war of 1812,

G.P. Putnam's sons, New York, p. 541 E'book

- —— (1901) The naval operations of the war between Great Britain and the United States, 1812–1815

Little, Brown, and Company, Boston. p. 290 E'book Book2 Book3

- Skaggs, David Curtis; Cogar, William B., Ed. (1989) Joint Operations During the Detroit- Lake Erie Campaign, 1813. In New Interpretations in Naval History: Selected Papers From the Eighth Naval History Symposium, 121–138.

Naval Institute Press, Annapolis, p. 302 Url

- ——; Altoff, Gerard T. (2000). A Signal Victory: The Lake Erie Campaign, 1812–1813
  Naval Institute Press, p. 264, ISBN 9781557508928, Url
- Skeen, Carl Edward (1999). Citizen Soldiers in the War of 1812
  University Press of Kentucky, p. 229, ISBN 9780813128801, Book (par view)
- Soley, James Russell, (1887), The boys of 1812 and other naval heroes,

Estes and Lauriat, Boston, p. 338, Url

- Stacey, Charles Perry. (1963) Naval Power On The Lakes, 1812–1814.

In Philip P. Mason, ed. After Tippecanoe: Some Aspects of the War of 1812
UP, Michigan State pp 49–59 online version

- —— The Ships of the British Squadron on Lake Ontario, 1812-14 (1953) Canadian Historical Review, XXXIV

Published by author, 1953 Url

- Thomson, John L. (1817). Historical sketches of the late war, between the United States and Great Britain,

Thomas Desilver. p. 367 Url

- Tomlinson, Everett Titsworth, (1906). The war of 1812,

Silver, Burdett and Co, New York, p.200, E'Book

- Tucker, Spencer C., (2012). The Encyclopedia Of the War Of 1812 ABC-CLIO. p. 1034, Url
- Walker, Alexander, (1856), Jackson and New Orleans. An authentic narrative of the memorable achievements of the American army, under Andrew Jackson, before New Orleans, in the winter of 1814, '15
  J. C. Derby, p. 411, E'Book
Top

== Oliver Hazard Perry ==
- Barnes, James (1912). The hero of Erie: (Oliver Hazard Perry)

D. Appleton & Company, New York, London, p. 167, E'book

- —— (1905) The Blockaders: And Other Stories
  Harper & Brothers, New York, p. 202 E'book
- Dillon, Richard (1978). We have met the enemy: Oliver Hazard Perry, wilderness commodore,

McGraw-Hill. p. 231. ISBN 0070169810, Url

- Dutton, Charles J. (2006). Oliver Hazard Perry,

Scholar's Bookshelf. p. 308. ISBN 0945726368, Url

- Mackenzie, Alexander Slidell (1840). The life of Commodore Oliver Hazard Perry, Volume 1,

Harper & Brothers, New York. p. 443, E'book

- —— (1910). Commodore Oliver Hazard Perry,

D.M. MacLellan Book Company, New York, NY/Akron, OH. p. 443. OCLC 2661311, E'book

- Mills, James Cooke (1913). Oliver Hazard Perry and the battle of Lake Erie,

John Phelps, Detroit. p. 284, E'Book

- Niles, John Milton (1820). The Life of Oliver Hazard Perry
  William S. Marsh, Hartford, p. 376, E'book
- Paullin, Charles Oscar (1918) P : The battle of Lake Erie: a collection of documents, chiefly by Commodore Perry ...,

The Rowfant Club, Cleveland, Ohio. p. 222, E'book

- Skaggs, David Curtis (2006) Oliver Hazard Perry: honor, courage, and patriotism in the early U.S. Navy
  Naval Institute Press p. 302 ISBN 1-59114-792-1, Book (par view)
Other sources for Oliver Hazard Perry can be found at:
Bibliography for War of 1812 ~ List of books about the War of 1812
~

== Joshua Barney ==
- Adams, William Frederick, (2008). Commodore Joshua Barney (1912)

Kessinger Publishing, p. 354, ISBN 9780548988572, Book (no view)

- —— (2010). Commodore Joshua Barney (Volume 2);

Many Interesting Facts Connected with the Life of Commodore Joshua Barney, Hero of the United States Navy,
General Books, p. 68, Book (no view)

- Barney, Mary, (1832). P : A biographical memoir of the late Commodore Joshua Barney: (Note: ... from autographical notes and journals in possession of his family, and other authentic sources)
  Gray and Bowen, Boston, p. 328, E'book
- Footner, Hulbert, (1940). Sailor of Fortune: The Life and Adventures of Commodore Barney, Usn,

Naval Institute Press, p. 323, ISBN 9781557502797, Book (par view)

- Norton, Louis A., (2000). Joshua Barney: Hero of the Revolution and 1812,

Naval Institute Press, p. 227, ISBN 9781557504906, Book (par view)

- Paine, Ralph D., (2010). Joshua Barney: A Forgotten Hero of Blue Water, Kessinger Publishing, p. 456, ISBN 9781164512325, Book
- Weller, Michael Ignatius, (1911). Commodore Joshua Barney, the Hero of the Battle of Bladensburg:

Incidents of His Life Gleaned from Contemporaneous Sources, University of Minnesota, p. 117, Book (snippit view)

Other sources for Joshua Barney can be found at:
Bibliography for Continental Navy ~ Bibliography for War of 1812
~

== Matthew C. Perry ==
- Barr, Pat. (1967). The Coming of the Barbarians: The Opening of Japan to the West, 1853–1870,

Dutton and Co., New York, p. 236, Book (snippit view)

- Barrows, Edward Morley (1935). The Great Commodore: The Exploits of Matthew Calbraith Perry,

Bobbs-Merrill Company, New York, Indianapolis, p.397 , (Note: Reprinted by Ayer Publishing, 1972, 397 pages) Book (no view)

- Bennett, Frank Marion; Weir, Robert (1896). The steam navy of the United States:

A history of the growth of the steam vessel of war in the U. S. Navy, and of the naval engineer corps,
Press of W. T. Nicholson, Pittsburgh. p. 953, E'book

- Griffis, William Elliot (1887). Matthew Calbraith Perry: a typical American naval officer,

Cupples and Hurd, Boston. p. 459, E'book

- Morison, Samuel Eliot, (1967), "Old Bruin": Commodore Matthew C. Perry, 1794–1858: the American naval officer who helped found Liberia ..., (1900),

Little, Brown, p. 482, Book (snippit view)

- Perry, Matthew Calbraith, (1968). p : The Japan Expedition, 1852–1854: the personal journal of Commodore Matthew C. Perry,

Smithsonian Institution Press, p. 241, Url

- Schroeder, John H. (2001). Matthew Calbraith Perry,

Naval Institute Press, p. 326, ISBN 1557508127, Book (par view)

- Taussig, J. K., U.S. Navy; Krout, Mary H. (1921). P : United States Naval Institute Proceedings, Volume 47 "Perry's Expedition to Japan",

United States Naval Institute. p. 2051, E'book

Other sources for Matthew C. Perry can be found in
bibliography for Mexican–American War / Texas Navy
~

== Mexican–American War ~ Texas Navy ==
- Bauer, K. Jack, (1969). Surfboats and Horse Marines: U.S. Naval Operations in the Mexican War, 1846–1848,

United States Naval Institute. p. 291 Book (snippit view)

- Brockmann, R. John, (2009). Commodore Robert F. Stockton, 1795–1866: Protean Man for a Protean Nation, the only scholarly biography,

Cambria Press, Amherst, Massachusetts, p. 622, ISBN 978-1-60497-630-4, Book (par view)

- Douglas, Claude Leroy, (1936). Thunder on the gulf: or, The story of the Texas navy,

Publisher, p. 128, Book (snippit view)

- Dienst, Alex (2007). The Texas Navy

Fireship Press, (Note: Originally published by Dienst in 1909 as The Navy of the Republic of Texas) p. 208, ISBN 1934757047, Book (par view)

- Fischer, Earnest G (1900). Robert Potter: Founder of the Texas Navy,

Pelican Publishing Company Incorporated, p. 320, ISBN 0882890808, Book (no view)

- Francaviglia, Richard, From Sail to Steam; Four Centuries of Texas Maritime History,

University of Texas Press, ISBN 0-292-72503-5, Book (par view)

- Garrison, George P., Editor, (1910). The Quarterly of the Texas State Historical Association, Volume 13,

Texas State Historical Association, p. 344, E'book

- Hill, Jim Dan (1987). The Texas Navy: in forgotten battles and shirtsleeve diplomacy,

State House Press, p. 224, ISBN 0938349171, Book (snippit view)

- Sam Houston, Moore, Edwin Ward, (1843). P : To the People of Texas, p. 204, Book (no view)
- Jordan, Jonathan (2006). Lone Star Navy: Texas, the Fight for the Gulf of Mexico, and the Shaping of the American West

Potomac Books, Washington, DC, p. 381, ISBN 978-1-57488-512-5, Book (snippit view)

- Meed, Douglas (2001). The Fighting Texas Navy, 1832–1843, Republic of Texas Press, Plano, TX, ISBN 978-1-55622-885-8, Book (no view)
- Sullivan, Roy F. (2010). The Texas Navies, AuthorHouse, Bloomington, IN, p. 176, ISBN 1449052584, Book (par view)
- United States (Government), Naval History Division, (1968), The Texas Navy, Volume 2; Volume 31,

U.S. Government Printing Office, p. 40, Book (snippit view)

- Wells, Tom Henderson (1988) Commodore Moore and the Texas Navy

University of Texas Press, Austin, TX, p.240 ISBN 978-0-292-71118-1, Book (no view)

~

== American Civil War ==
- Anderson, Bern (1962). By Sea and by River: The Naval History of the Civil War

Da Capo Press, p. 303, ISBN 9780306803673, Url

- Ammen, Daniel (1883). The Navy in the Civil War

Charles Scribner's Sons, New York, p. 282, e'Book

- Arnold, James R.; Wiener, Roberta; (2011). American Civil War: The Essential Reference Guide
  ABC-CLIO, p. 432, 9781598849059, Book (snippit view)
- Baldwin, John; Powers, Ron (2007). Last Flag Down: The Epic Journey of the Last Confederate Warship
  Crown Publishers, New York, p. 368 ISBN 978-0-307-23655-5, Book (par view)
- Bennett, Frank Marion; Weir, Robert (1896). The Steam Navy of the United States: A History of the Growth of the Steam Vessel of War in the U. S. Navy, and of the Naval Engineer Corps
  Warren & Company; Press of W. T. Nicholson, Pittsburgh, p. 953, e'Book
- Bennett, Michael J. (2004). Union Jacks: Yankee Sailors in the Civil War

Univ of North Carolina Press, p. 337, ISBN 9780807828700, Book (par view)

- Bigelow, John, (1888). France and the Confederate Navy, 1862–1868: an international episode, Volume 3,

Harper & Brothers, New York, p.247, e'Book

- Bostick, Douglas W. (2010). Charleston Under Siege: The Impregnable City

The History Press, Charleston, South Carolina, p. 158, ISBN 9781596297579, Book (par view)

- Brennan, Patrick (1996). Secessionville: Assault on Charleston

Savas Publishing Company, Campbell, California, p. 394, ISBN 1-882810-08-2, Book (par view)

- Burton, E. Milby (1982). The Siege of Charleston 1861–1865

University of South Carolina Press, Columbia, South Carolina, p.390, ISBN 0-87249-345-8, Book (par view)

- Butler, Lindley S. Butler (2000) Pirates, Privateers, & Rebel Raiders of the Carolina Coast,
  UNC Press Books, p. 275 ISBN 9780807848630, Book (par view)
- Calore, Paul (2002). Naval Campaigns of the Civil War

McFarland, New York. p. 232, Book (par view)

- Campbell, R. Thomas (1996). Gray Thunder: Exploits of the Confederate States Navy

Burd Street Press, Shippensburg, Pennsylvania, ISBN 0-942597-99-0, Book (no view)

- —— (1996). Southern thunder: exploits of the Confederate States Navy
  Burd Street Press, p. 198, ISBN 9781572490291, Book (snippit view)
- —— (1997). Fire and Thunder: Exploits of the Confederate States Navy

Burd Street Press, Shippensburg, Pennsylvania, p. 294, ISBN 1-57249-067-5, Book (snippit view)

- —— (1997). Southern Fire: Exploits of the Confederate States Navy

Burd Street Press, Shippensburg, Pennsylvania, p.263, ISBN 1-57249-046-2, Book (snippit view)

- —— (2011). Confederate Naval Forces on Western Waters: The Defense of the Mississippi River and Its Tributaries,

Jefferson, North Carolina: McFarland & Co., p.372 ISBN 0-7864-2203-3, Book (no view)

- —— (2008). P : Voices of the Confederate Navy: Articles, Letters, Reports, and Reminiscences

McFarland & Co., p. 366, ISBN 9780786431489, Book (par view)

- (Different authors for each chapter) (1885). THE CENTURY ILLUSTRATED MONTHLY MAGAZINE
  F. Warne & Co., London, p. 960, E'book
- Conrad, James Lee (2003). Rebel Reefers: The Organization and Midshipmen of the Confederate States Naval Academy

Da Capo Press, New York, p. 214, ISBN 9780306812378, Url

- Coombe, Jack D., (1999). Gunfire Around the Gulf: The Last Major Naval Campaign of the Civil War

Bantam Books, New York, p. 256, ISBN 0553107313, Url

- Coski, John M. (1996). Capital Navy: The Men, Ships, and Operations of the James River Squadron.

Campbell, California: Savas Woodbury Publishers, p.344, Url

- —— (2005). The Confederate Navy

The Museum of the Confederacy, Richmond, Virginia, p.63, Url

- Cracknell, William H. (1973). United States Navy Monitors of the Civil War

Profile Publications, Windsor, England, p. 24, Url

- Daniels, Secretary of the Navy, Josephus; Marsh, Captain, U.S.Navy, C.C. (1921)

P : Official records of the Union and Confederate navies in the War of the Rebellion
Government Printing Office, United States; Naval War Records Office, Office of Naval Records and Library, p. 980 ISBN 1-58218-556-5, E'book

- Daniel, Larry J.; Bock, Lynn N. (1996). Island No. 10: Struggle for the Mississippi Valley. University of Alabama Press. ISBN 978-0-8173-0816-2.
- De Kay, James T. (1999). Monitor: The Story of the Legendary Civil War Ironclad and the Man Whose Invention Changed the Course of History. Ballantine Books. ISBN 978-0-3454-2635-2. 247 pages.
- Donnelly, Ralph W. (1989) The Confederate States Marine Corps: the rebel leathernecks,
  White Mane Publishing Company, Incorporated, p. 337, ISBN 9780942597134, Url
- Donovan, Frank Robert (1961). The Ironclads

Barnes publishing, p. 125 Book (snippit view)

- Durham, Roger S. (2005). High Seas and Yankee Gunboats: A Blockade-Running Adventure from the Diary of James Dickson,

Univ of South Carolina Press, p. 185, ISBN 1570035725, Url

- Eicher, David J., (1997). The Civil War in Books An Analytical Bibliography (Note: An Analytical Bibliography and an annotated guide to 1100 titles)

University of Illinois Press, p. 407 excerpt and text search

- Elliott, Robert G. (1994 / 2005). Ironclad of the Roanoke: Gilbert Elliott's Albemarle
  White Mane Publishing Co., Shippensburg, Pennsylvania, p. 372, ISBN 9781572493742, Url
- Field, Ron, (2008). Confederate Ironclad vs. Union Ironclad: Hampton Roads 1862

Osprey Publishing, United Kingdom, p. 80, ISBN 9781846032325, Url

- Fowler, William M., (1990). Under Two Flags: The American Navy in the Civil War

Naval Institute Press, p. 352, ISBN 9781557502896, Url

- Fuller, Howard J. (2008). Clad in Iron – The American Civil War and the Challenge of British Naval Power
  |publisher=Naval Institute Press, Annapolis, Maryland, p. 409, ISBN 978-1-59114-297-3, Book
- Gibbons, Tony, (1989). Warships and naval battles of the Civil War

Gallery Books, p. 176, ISBN 0-8317-9301-5, Url

- Gorgas, Josiah (1995). Sarah Woolfolk Wiggins. ed. P : The Journals of Josiah Gorgas, 1857–1878

University of Alabama Press. p. 305, ISBN 0-8071-0007-2 Url

- Hearn, Chester G. (1992). Gray raiders of the sea: how eight Confederate warships destroyed the Union's high seas commerce

International Marine Pub., p. 351. ISBN 978-0807121146, Url

- Holzer, Harold (2013). The Civil War in 50 Objects
  New-York Historical Society, Penguin Books, p. 416, ISBN 9781101613115, Book (par view)
- Johnson, John (1890). The Defense of Charleston Harbor
  Walker, Evans & Cogswell Company, p. 276, E'book
- Johnson, Robert Underwood; Buel, Clarence Clough, (1887). Battles and Leaders of the Civil War, Volume 1,

Century Company, New York, p. 750, E'book

- Hoppin, James Mason (1874). Life of Andrew Hull Foote rear-admiral United States Navy. Harper & Brothers, New York.
- Konstam, Angus (2002). (2001) Confederate Ironclad 1861-65
  Osprey Publishing, p. 48, ISBN 9781841763071, Url
- —— (2002). Mississippi River Gunboats of the American Civil War 1861-65

Osprey Publishing, UK. p. 48. ISBN 1-84176-413-2, Url

- ——; Bryan, Tony (2002). Union River Ironclad 1861-65
  Osprey Publishing, p. 48, ISBN 9781841764443, Url
- —— (2002). Union Monitor 1861-65
  Osprey Publishing, p. 48, ISBN 9781841763064, Url
- —— (2002) Hampton Roads 1862: Clash of the Ironclads
  Osprey Publishing, p. 96, ISBN 9781841764108, Url
- ——; Bryan, Tony (2003). Confederate Raider 1861-65
  Osprey Publishing, p. 48, ISBN 9781841764962, Url
- ——; —— (2004). Confederate Submarines and Torpedo Vessels
  Osprey Publishing, p. 48, ISBN 9781841767208, Url
- Lambert, Andrew (1984). Battleships in Transition, the Creation of the Steam Battlefleet 1815–1860,

Conway Maritime Press, . ISBN 0-85177-315-X

- Lardas, Mark (2011). CSS Alabama Vs USS Kearsarge: Cherbourg 1864
  Osprey Publishing, p. 80, ISBN 978-1849084925, Url
- Leckie, Robert (1990). None Died in Vain: The Saga of the American Civil War
  Harper-Collins, New York, p. 682, ISBN 0-06-016280-5, Book
- Luraghi, Raimondo, (1996). A history of the Confederate Navy,

Naval Institute Press, p.514, Url

- MacBride, Robert (1962 / 2011). Civil War Ironclads: The Dawn of Naval Armor
  Literary Licensing, Philadelphia, p. 196, ISBN 9781258002718, Url
- Mahan, Alfred Thayer, n (1883). The gulf and inland waters, Volume 3,

Charles Scribner, New York, p. 267, E'book

- —— (1907). P : From sail to steam: recollections of naval life,

Harper & Brothers, New York, London, p. 325, E'book

- —— (1905). Admiral Farragut. New York : The University Society. ( • Plain text format)
- —— (1885). The Navy in the Civil War. New York, Charles Scribner's sons.
- McPherson, James M. (1988). Battle cry of Freedom
  Oxford University Press, New York; p. 904, ISBN 0-19-503863-0, Book
- Melton, Maurice (1968). The Confederate Ironclads

Thomas Yoseloff Ltd, South Brunswick, New Jersey, p. 319, OCLC 559832629

- Merli, Frank J. (1970). Great Britain and the Confederate Navy, 1861–1865

Indiana University Press, Indiana. p. 342. ISBN 0-253-21735-0 Url

- Merrill, James M. (1957). The Rebel Shore: the story of Union sea power in the Civil War

Little, Brown Publishing, p. 246, E'Book

- Mokion, Arthur (1991). Ironclad: The Monitor & the Merrimack

Presidio Press, Novato, California, ISBN 0-89141-405-3, Url

- Morgan, Murray (1948). Confederate raider in the north Pacific:the saga of the C.S.S. Shenandoah, 1864-65
  Washington State University Press, p. 336, ISBN 9780874221237, Url
- Musicant, Ivan. (1995). Divided Waters: The Naval History of the Civil War

HarperCollins Publishers, New York, p. 473, ISBN 0-06-016482-4, Book (snippit view)

- Nash, Howard Pervear (1972). A naval history of the Civil War
  A. S. Barnes, p. 375, ISBN 9780498078415, Url
- Oberholtzer, Ellis Paxson (1904) , Philadelphia: George W. Jacobs, 1904, pp. 389, E'book
- —— (1907). Financier of the Civil War, Volumes I and II
  G.W. Jacobs & Company, Philadelphia, p. 658, E'book, vol.I
- —— (1907). Financier of the Civil War, Volume II
  G.W. Jacobs & Company, Philadelphia, p. 590, E'book, vol.II
- Olmstead, Edwin (1997). Stark, Wayne E., Tucker, Spencer C. The Big Guns: Civil War Siege, Seacoast and Naval Cannon,

Museum Restoration Service, p. 360, ISBN 088855012X, Url

- Page, David (2001). Ships Versus Shore: Civil War Engagements Along Southern Shores and Rivers
  Thomas Nelson Incorporated, p. 412, ISBN 9781558538924, Url
- Pratt, Fletcher (1956). Civil War on Western Waters
  Henry Holt and Company, p. 255, Url.
- Porter David Dixon (1886). P : The Naval History of the Civil War.

McFarland. p. 843, E'book

- Quarstein, John V. (2006). History of Ironclads: The Power of Iron Over Wood
  The History Press, p. 284, ISBN 9781596291188, Book
- Rawson, Edward K., Superintendent Naval War Records; Woods, Robert H. (1898).
  P : OFFICIAL RECORDS of the UNION AND CONFEDERATE NAVIES in the WAR OF THE REBELLION.
  Washington D. C.: Published by John D. Long, Secretary of the Navy, Government Printing Office. p. 895., E'book
- Rhodes, James Ford (1917). History of the Civil War
  Macmillan & Co., New York, Boston, London, p. 467, E'book (Note: Awarded the Pulitzer Prize in History in 1918: Extensive coverage of Naval theater, blockade runners, David Farragut, David Dixon Porter etc)
- Richter, William L. (2004). Historical Dictionary of the Civil War and Reconstruction
  Scarecrow Press, Maryland, p. 968, ISBN 9780810865631, Url
- Roberts, William H. (1999). USS New Ironsides in the Civil War
  Naval Institute Press, Annapolis, Maryland ISBN 1-55750-695-7, Book
- —— (2007). Civil War Ironclads: The U.S. Navy and Industrial Mobilization

The Johns Hopkins University Press, Baltimore, p. 300, Url

- Robinson, Charles M. (1995). Shark of the confederacy: the story of the CSS Alabama,
  Leo Cooper Publishers, p. 212, Url
- Robinson, William Morrison (1994). The Confederate Privateers

Univ of South Carolina Press, p. 404, ISBN 9781570030055, Url

- Rush Richard; Woods, Robert H. (N); (1895). Official Records of the Union and Confederate Navies in the War of the Rebellion
  U.S. Government Printing Office, p. 922, E'book
- Schouler, James (1899). History of the civil war, 1861–1865: being vol. VI of History of the United States of America, under the constitution
  Dodd, Meade & Co., New York, p. 699, E'book (Note: Extensive coverage of Naval theater, blockade runners, David Farragut, David Dixon Porter, etc)
- Shaw, David W. (2005). Sea Wolf of the Confederacy: The Daring Civil War Raids of Naval Lt. Charles W. Read
  Sheridan House, Inc, p. 256, ISBN 9781574092073, Url
- Silverstone, Paul (1989). Warships of the Civil War Navies

Naval Institute Press, Annapolis, p. 288. ISBN 978-0870217838 Url

- Slagle, Jay (1996). Ironclad Captain: Seth Ledyard Phelps & the U.S. Navy, 1841–1864. Kent State University Press. ISBN 978-0-8733-8550-3.
- Smith, Myron J. (2010). Tinclads in the Civil War: Union Light-Draught Gunboat Operations on Western Waters, 1862–1865

Osprey Publishing, UK. p. 423. ISBN 978-0-7864-3579-1 Url

- —— (2008). The Timberclads in the Civil War: The Lexington, Conestoga and Tyler on the Western Waters

McFarland & Company, Inc., Jefferson, North Carolina, p. 552, ISBN 978-0-7864-4726-8, Url

- Spencer, Warren F. (1997). The Confederate Navy in Europe

University of Alabama Press Press. p. 288, ISBN 0-87249-986-3, Url

- Stern, Philip Van Doren (1962). The Confederate Navy: A Pictorial History

Doubleday Books, p. 252, Url

- Still, Jr., William N. (2003). Confederate Shipbuilding,

University of South Carolina Press, Columbia, South Carolina, p. 110, ISBN 9780872495111 Url

- Symonds, Craig L. (1999). Confederate Admiral: The Life and Wars of Franklin Buchanan
  Naval Institute Press, p. 274, ISBN 9781557508447, Url
- Taafe, Stephen R. (2009). Commanding Lincoln's Navy: Union Naval Leadership During the Civil War

Naval Institute Press, Annapolis, Maryland, p. 324

- Tenney, W. J., (1867). The Military and Naval History of the Rebellion in the United States:, (Note: With Biographical Sketches of Deceased Officers. Illustrated with Steel Plate Portraits)

D. Appleton, New York, p. 843, Url

- Tucker, Spencer C. (2001). A Short History of the Civil War at Sea

SR Books, Wilmington, Delaware, Url

- —— (2006). Blue & gray navies: the Civil War afloat

Naval Institute Press, Maryland. p. 426, ISBN 1-59114-882-0 Url

- —— (2010). The Civil War Naval Encyclopedia, Volume 1

ABC-CLIO. p. 829. ISBN 978-1-59884-338-5 Url

- —— (1988). Arming the Fleet. U.S. Ordnance in the Muzzle-Loading Era

Naval Institute Press, p. 308, ISBN 9780870210075 Url

- Turner, Maxine, (1999). Navy Gray: Engineering the Confederate Navy on the Chattahoochee and Apalachicola Rivers,

Mercer University Press, p.357, The+Confederate+Navy Url

- United States. Naval History Division, (1965). Civil War naval chronology, 1861–1865, Volume 5
  U. S. Govt. Print. Off., p. 149, Url
- Varhola, Michael J. (1999). Everyday Life During the Civil War
  Writer's Digest Books, 292 pages, ISBN 9781582973371, Book (no view)
- Wagner, Margaret E.; McPherson, James M. (2006). The Library of Congress Civil War Desk Reference

Simon and Schuster Inc., New York, p. 976, ISBN 978-1-4391-4884-6, Url1, Url2

- Ward, Geoffrey; Burns, Ric; Burns, Ken (1990) The Civil War: An Illustrated History
  Alfred A. Knopf, New York; p. 426 ISBN 0-394-56285-2, Book
- Watson, William (1893) The adventures of a blockade runner: or, Trade in time of war

T. Fisher Unwin, New York, 1893 / Texas A & M University Press, 2001. p. 324, ISBN 1-58544-152-X E'book Url2

- Wilson, H. W. (1896). Ironclads in Action: A Sketch of Naval Warfare From 1855 to 1895. Vol. 1. Boston:
  Little, Brown., E'book
- Wilson, Walter E.; McKay, Gary L. (2012). James D. Bulloch: Secret Agent and Mastermind of the Confederate Navy

McFarland, North Carolina. p. 362. ISBN 0786466596 Url

- Woodworth, Steven E. (1996). The American Civil War: A Handbook of Literature and Research

Greenwood Publishing Group. p. 754. ISBN 1-57958-331-8 Url

Top

=== Abraham Lincoln ===
- Canney, Donald L. (1998). Lincoln's Navy: The Ships, Men and Organization, 1861-65,

Naval Institute Press. p. 232, Url

- Donald, David Herbert, (1996). Lincoln

Simon and Schuster, New York. p. 714. ISBN 978-0684825359, Url

- Joiner, Gary D. (2007). Mr. Lincoln's Brown Water Navy: The Mississippi Squadron,

Rowman & Littlefield, Maryland. p. 199, ISBN 0742550982 Url

- Sandburg Carl (1954). Abraham Lincoln,

Galahad Books, New York. p. 762. ISBN 0-88365-832-1. Url

- Symonds, Craig L., (2008). Lincoln and His Admirals

Oxford University Press. p. 448. ISBN 0195310225 Url

- —— (2012). The Civil War at Sea

Oxford University Press. p. 256. ISBN 0199931682, Url

- Weddle, Kevin J. (2005). Lincoln's Tragic Admiral: The Life of Samuel Francis Du Pont.

University of Virginia Press, p. 269, ISBN 9780813923321, Url

- Welles, Gideon, n, (1911). P : Diary of Gideon Welles, Secretary of the Navy Under Lincoln and Johnson, Volume 1,

Houghton Mifflin Co., Boston, New York; Original from Harvard University press. p. 553 E'book

- —— (1911). P : Diary of Gideon Welles, Secretary of the Navy Under Lincoln and Johnson, Volume 2

Houghton Mifflin Co., Boston, New York; Original from Harvard University press. p. 659 E'Book

- —— (1911). P : Diary of Gideon Welles, Secretary of the Navy Under Lincoln and Johnson, Volume 3

Houghton Mifflin Co., Boston, New York; Original from Harvard University press. p. 674 E'Book

Other sources for Abraham Lincoln can be found in:
bibliography for American Civil War
~

=== David Farragut ~ David Porter ===
- Adelson, Bruce (2001). David Farragut: Union Admiral

Infobase Publishing p. 80. ISBN 0791064174. Url

- Anderson, Bern (1962). By Sea and by River: The Naval History of the Civil War

Da Capo Press, p. 303, ISBN 9780306803673, Url

- Barnes, James (1899). David G. Farragut

Small, Maynard & Company, p. 132. ISBN 1592963838. Url

- —— (1909). Midshipman Farragut D. Appleton and Company, New York. p. 151. E'book
- Duffy, James P. (1997). Lincoln's Admiral: the Civil War Campaigns of David Farragut.

Wiley, ISBN 0-471-04208-0, Url

- Farragut , Loyall (1879). The life of David Glasgow Farragut, first admiral of the United States navy:embodying his journal and letters.

D. Appleton and company, New York. p. 586. E'book

- Foster, Leila Merrell (1991). David Glasgow Farragut: Courageous Navy Commander
  Children's Press, p. 107, Url
- Hearn, Chester G. (1995). The Capture of New Orleans 1862

Louisiana State University Press, Baton Rouge, Louisiana, p. 292 ISBN 0-8071-1945-8, Url

- —— (1996). Admiral David Dixon Porter: the Civil War years
  Naval Institute Press, p. 376, ISBN 9781557503534, Url
- Houston, Florence Amelia Wilson; Blaine, Laura Anna Cowan; Mellette, Ella Dunn (1916).
  Maxwell History and Genealogy: Including the Allied Families ...

Press of C.E. Pauley, Indianapolis Engraving Company. p. 642. E'book

- Lewis, Charles Lee (1980). David Glasgow Farragut
  Ayer Company Publishers, ISBN 9780405130434, Url
- Long, David Foster (1970). Nothing too daring: a biography of Commodore David Porter, 1780–1843

U.S. Naval Institute. p. 396. ISBN 0870214942. Url

- Mahan, Alfred Thayer, (1892). Admiral Farragut

D. Appleton and company, New York. p. 333. E'book

- Martin, Christopher (1970). Damn the torpedoes!: the story of America's first admiral: David Glasgow Farragut
  Abelard-Schuman, p. 280, Url
- Optic, Oliver (1891). Brave Old Salt: or, Life on the quarter deck. A story of the great rebellion

Lothrop, Lee and Shepard Co., Boston. p. 326. E'book

- Porter, David Dixon (1875). P : Memoir of Commodore David Porter: of the United States Navy
  J. Munsel, publishers, New York, p. 427, E'book
- Shorto, Russell (1991). David Farragut and the Great Naval Blockade

Silver Burdett Press. p. 128. ISBN 0382240502. Url

- Soley, Russell, James, (1903). Admiral Porter

D. Appleton, New York. p. 499. E'book

- Spears, John Randolph (1905). David G. Farragut

G.W. Jacobs, Philadelphia. p. 407. E'book

- Stein, R. Conrad (2005). David Farragut: first admiral of the U.S. Navy

Chelsea House Publishers. p. 40. ISBN 1592963838. Url

- Turnbull, Archibald Douglas (1929). Commodore David Porter, 1780–1843:

Century Company. p. 324. Url

- Wheeler, Richard (1969). In pirate waters

Rowell, 1969. p. 191. Url

Other sources for David Farragut and David Porter can be found in
bibliography for American Civil War
~

=== Union blockade ~ Blockade running ===
- Bennett, Frank M. (1897). The steam navy of the United States:.

Warren & Company Publishers Philadelphia. p. 502. ISBN 1176467921, E'book Url2

- Bennett, Michael J. (2004). Union Jacks: Yankee Sailors in the Civil War,

Univ of North Carolina Press, p. 337, ISBN 9780807828700, Url

- Browning, Robert M., Jr. (2002). Success Is All That Was Expected: The South Atlantic Blockading Squadron During the Civil War
  Brassey's, Incorporated, p. 497, ISBN 9781574885149, Book (snippit view)
- —— (1993). From Cape Charles to Cape Fear. The North Atlantic Blockading Squadron during the Civil War,

University of Alabama Press. p. 472. ISBN 978-0817350192, Url

- Buker, George E. (1993). Blockaders, Refugees & Contrabands: Civil War on Florida's Gulf Coast, 1861–1865,

University of Alabama Press, Tuscaloosa, Alabama, p. 235, ISBN 9780817306823, Url

- Bulloch, James Dunwody, (1884). P : The secret service of the Confederate States in Europe, or How the Confederate cruisers were equipped,

G.P. Putnam's Sons, New York, p. 460, Url

- Carr, Dawson (1988). Gray Phantoms of the Cape Fear: Running the Civil War Blockade
  John F. Blair, Publisher, p. 227, ISBN 9780895875525, Book (par view)
- Cochran, Hamilton (1958). Blockade runners of the Confederacy,

Bobbs-Merrill; Original, Univ. California, p. 350, Url

- Dept U.S. Navy, SHIPS of the CONFEDERATE STATES.

DEPARTMENT OF THE NAVY—NAVAL HISTORICAL CENTER.

- Calore, Paul (2002). Naval Campaigns of the Civil War

McFarland, p. 232, ISBN 978-0-7864-1217-4, Url

- Canney, Donald L. (1998). Lincoln's Navy: The Ships, Men and Organization, 1861–65

Naval Institute Press, p. 232, Url

- Confederate Congress, 1861–1865 (1905). Journal of the Congress of the Confederate States of America, 1861–1865

U.S. Government Printing Office, Washington. p. 917, Url

- Cooper, William J. (2001). Jefferson Davis, American

Random House Digital, Inc. p. 848. ISBN 0-394-56916-4, Url

- Coulter, Ellis Merton, (1994, 7th printing) [1950]. The Confederate States of America, 1861–1865,

Louisiana State University Press. p. 644. ISBN 0-8071-0007-2, Url

- Daugherty, Kevin. (2010). Strangling the Confederacy: Coastal Operations in the American Civil War,

Casemate Publishers, p. 233, ISBN 9781935149248, Url

- Donald, David Herbert, (1996). Lincoln,

Simon and Schuster, New York. p. 714. ISBN 978-0684825359, Url

- Ellis, John E. "CONFEDERATE STATES NAVY, MUSEUM, LIBRARY & RESEARCH INSTITUTE".
  Confederate States Navy Research Library, Mobile, Alabama.
- Evans, Clement Anselm (1899). Confederate military history: a library of Confederate States history, Volume 12 Confederate publishing company. p. 403, Url
- Frajola, Richard (2011). "Tales from the Blockade",

Richard Frajola. p. 16, Retrieved 5 May 2012.

- Gorgas, Josiah (1995). Sarah Woolfolk Wiggins. ed. P : The Journals of Josiah Gorgas, 1857–1878,

University of Alabama Press. p. 305, ISBN 0-8071-0007-2, Url

- Graham, Eric J. (2006). Clyde built: blockade runners, cruisers and armoured rams of the American Civil War,

Birlinn, UK p. 238, ISBN 9781841585840, Url

- Heidler, David Stephen & Jeanne T.; Coles, David J. (2002). Encyclopedia of the American Civil War: A Political, Social, and Military History,

W.W. Norton & Company, New York. p. 2733, ISBN 0-393-04758-X. Url

- Hosmer, James Kendall (1913). The American civil war, Volume 2

Harper & Brothers Publishers, New York, London. p. 351, Url1

- Jones, Virgil Carrington (1960). The Blockaders: January 1861 – March 1862

Holt, Rinehart, Winston, p. 483, Url

- Jones, Howard (1992) Union in Peril: The Crisis Over British Intervention in the Civil War,

University of North Carolina Press Press. p. 300, Url

- Katcher, Philip R. N. (2003). The Army of Northern Virginia: Lee's Army in the American Civil War, 1861–1865,

Fitzroy Dearborn, New York. p. 352, ISBN 1-57958-331-8 Url

- Konstam, Angus; Bryan, Tony (2004). Confederate Blockade Runner 1861–65

Osprey Publishing, Wisconsin. p. 48, Url

- MacDonald, John (2009). The Historical Atlas of the Civil War,

Chartwell Books, New York. p. 400, ISBN 978-07858-2703-0. Url

- McNeil, Jim (2003). Masters of the Shoals: Tales of the Cape Fear Pilots Who Ran the Union Blockade,

Da Capo Press. p. 188. ISBN 0-306-81280-0. Url

- Merli, Frank J. (1970). Great Britain and the Confederate Navy, 1861–1865,

Indiana University Press, Indiana. p. 342. ISBN 0-253-21735-0. Url

- Peters, Thelma Peterson (1939). The Bahamas and Blockade-running During the American Civil War,

Duke University, North Carolina. p. 145, ISBN 1-57958-331-8, Url Url2

- Sandburg Carl (1954). Abraham Lincoln,

Galahad Books, New York, p. 762. ISBN 0-88365-832-1, Url

- Scharf, John Thomas n (1894). P : History of the Confederate States navy from its organization to the surrender of its last vessel,

Joseph McDonough, Albany, N.Y.. p. 824, ISBN 0-517-18336-6.

- Semmes, Raphael, n (1864). P : The Cruise of the Alabama and the Sumter,

Digital Scanning, Inc., Mass. p. 348. ISBN 1-58218-355-4, ISBN 1-58218-353-8 Url

- —— (1869). P : Memoirs of service afloat: during the war between the states,

Kelly, Piet & Co., Baltimore. p. 833, ISBN 1-58218-556-5, E'Book

- Shingleton, Royce (1979). John Taylor Wood: Sea Ghost of the Confederacy
  University of Georgia Press, p. 242, ISBN 9780820304663, Book (no view)
- Shingleton, Royce (1994). High Seas Confederate: The Life and Times of John Newland Maffitt,

University of South Carolina Press. p. 160, ISBN 0-87249-986-3 Url

- Soley, James Russell (1885). The Blockade And The Cruisers,

Digital Scanning Inc. p. 276. ISBN 1-58218-556-5, Book (par view)

- Spencer, Warren F. (1997). The Confederate Navy in Europe,

University of Alabama Press Press. p. 288, ISBN 0-87249-986-3, Url

- Stark, James H. (1891). Stark's history and guide to the Bahama Islands,

Duke University, North Carolina. p. 243 Url

- Still, Jr., William N. (1997). The Confederate Navy: the ships, men and organization, 1861–65
  Conway Maritime Press, p. 262, Url
- Still, Jr., William N. (1988). Iron Afloat
  Univ of South Carolina Press, p. 276, ISBN 9780872496163, Par'View
- ——; Taylor, John M., Delaney Norman C. (1998).Raiders & Blockaders: The American Civil War Afloat,

Brassey's Inc., Washington, D.C, p. 263, ISBN 1-57488-164-7, Url

- Tans, Jochem H. (1995). The Hapless Anaconda: Union Blockade 1861–1865,

The Concord Review, Inc.. p. 30. Url

- U.S.Congress, 1893–1894 (1895). Congressional edition, Volume 3267, Issue 1,

U.S. Government Printing Office, Washington. p. 989, Url

- Trotter, William R. (1989) Ironclads and Columbiads: The Coast
  John F. Blair Publisher, p. 456, ISBN 9780895870889, Book
- Wagner, Margaret E.; McPherson, James M., (2006). The Library of Congress Civil War Desk Reference,

Simon and Schuster Inc., New York, p. 976. ISBN 978-1-4391-4884-6, Url1, Url2

- Walske, Steve, (2011). Civil War Blockade Mail: 1861–1865,

Steve Walske Exhibition at WESTPEX 2011. p. 32, Url

- Wilkinson, John (1877). P : The Narrative of a Blockade-Runner,

Sheldon & Company, New York. p. 252, Url1, Url2

- Wilson, Walter E.; Mckay, Gary L. (2012) James D. Bulloch: Secret Agent and Mastermind of the Confederate Navy
  McFarland & Company, North Carolina, p. 362, ISBN 978-0-7864-6659-7, Url
- Wise, Stephen R., (1991). Lifeline of the Confederacy: Blockade Running During the Civil War,

Univ of South Carolina Press. p. 403, ISBN 0-87249-554-X, Url

- —— (1994). Gate of Hell: Campaign for Charleston, 1863,

Univ of South Carolina Press, p. 312, ISBN 9780872499850, Url

- Woods, Robert H.; Rush, Richard, Lieut. Commander, U.S. Navy, n (1896). P : Official records of the Union and Confederate navies in the War of the Rebellion,

Government Printing Office, United States. Naval War Records Office, United States, under the direction of Hon. H.A. Herbert, Secretary of the Navy Office of Naval Records and Library. p. 276, ISBN 1-58218-556-5 Url

- Wyllie, Arthur (2007). The Union Navy,

Lulu .com. p. 668, ISBN 978-1-4303-2117-0, Url1

- —— (2007). Confederate Officers,

Lulu.com. p. 580. ISBN 978-0-615-17222-4, Url1

- —— (2007). The Confederate States Navy,

Lulu.com. p. 466 ISBN 978-0-615-17222-4, Url1, Url2

- For general reference to the American Civil War see also: Bibliography of the American Civil War

See also : Blockade runners of the American Civil War

Top

=== USS Monitor ~ CSS Virginia ===
- Baxter, James Phinney (1968). The introduction of the ironclad warship,

Archon Books, p. 398, Book (snippit view)

- Bennett, Lieutenant, U.S. Navy, Frank M. (1900). The Monitor and the Navy under steam
  Houghton, Mifflin and Company, Boston and New York, p. 369, E'book
- Besse, Summer B. (1937). The C.S. Ironclad Virginia: With Data and References for a Scale Model,

Newport News, Virginia, p. 47, Book (snippit view)

- Bradford, James C. (1986). Captains of the Old Steam Navy: Makers of the American Tradition, 1840–1880
  Naval Institute Press, p. 356, ISBN 9780870210136, Book
- Broadwater, John D. (2012). USS Monitor: A Historic Ship Completes Its Final Voyage
  Texas A&M University Press, p. 239, ISBN 9781603444736, Book (par view)
- Brooke, John Mercer (1891). P : The Virginia, or Merrimac: her real projector
  W.E. Jones, book and job printer, p. 34, E'book
- —— (2002). P : Ironclads and Big Guns of the Confederacy: The Journal and Letters of John M. Brooke
  Univ of South Carolina Press, p. 257 ISBN 978-1570034183, Book (par view)
- Burnett, Constance Buel (1960). Captain John Ericsson: father of the Monitor
  Vanguard Press, New York, p. 255, Book (snippit view)
- Bushnell, Cornelius Scranton; Ericsson, John; Well, Gideon (1899). P : The original United States warship "Monitor"
  National Memorial Association, New Haven, Conn., p. 50, E'book
- Campbell, R. Thomas; Flanders, Alan B. (2001) Confederate Phoenix: The Css Virginia
  Burd Street Press, p. 272, ISBN 9781572492011, Book (snippit view)
- Church, William Conant (1911). The Life of John Ericsson
  Charles Scribner, New York, p. 660, E'book
- Clancy, Paul (2013). Ironclad; The Epic Battle, Calamitous Loss, and Historic Recovery of the USS Monitor
  Koehler Books, New York, p. 340, ISBN 978-1-938467-11-0, Book (par view)
- Coombe, Jack (2008). Gunsmoke Over the Atlantic: First Naval Actions of the Civil War
  Random House LLC, p. 288, ISBN 9780307485731, Book (par view)
- Dahlgren, Madeleine Vinton (1882). P : Memoir of John A. Dahlgren, Rear-admiral United States Navy
  J. R. Osgood, p. 660, E'book
- Davis, William C. (1982). The deep waters of the proud
  Doubleday Press, p. 316, Book (snippit view)
- —— (2012). Duel Between the First Ironclads
  Random House Digital, Inc., p. 201, ISBN 9780307817501, (snippit view)
- De Kay, James Tertius (1998) Monitor: The Story of the Legendary Civil War Ironclad and the Man Whose Invention Changed the Course of History
  G.K. Hall, p. 226, ISBN 9780783884417, Book (Snippit view)
- Field, Ron (2011). Confederate Ironclad vs Union Ironclad: Hampton Roads 1862
  Osprey Publishing, p. 80, ISBN 9781780961415, Book (par view)
- Gentile, Gary (1993). Ironclad Legacy: Battles of the USS Monitor
  Gary Gentile Productions, 280 pages, ISBN 9780962145384, Book (snippit view)
- Hoehling, Adolph A.' (1993). Thunder at Hampton Roads
  Da Capo Press, p. 231, ISBN 9780306805233, Book (par view)
- Holloway, Anna (2013). The Last Voyage of the USS Monitor (PDF). Newport News, VA: The Mariner's Museum. Archived from the original (PDF) on December 4, 2013.
- Holzer, Harold; Mulligan, Tim (2006). The Battle of Hampton Roads: New Perspectives on the USS Monitor and CSS Virginia
  Fordham University Press, New York, ISBN 0-8232-2481-3, Book (par view)
- Jones, Virgil Carrington (1962). The Civil War at sea: The final effort, July 1863–November 1865, Volume 3
  Holt, Rinehart, Winston, p. 460, Book (snippit view)
- Konstam, Angus (2002). Hampton Roads 1862: First Clash of the Ironclads
  Osprey Publishing, p. 96, ISBN 9781841764108, Book (par view)
- McCordock, Robert Stanley (1938). The Yankee cheese box
  Dorrance, p. 470, Book (snippit view)
- Mindell, David A. (2000). War, Technology, and Experience Aboard the USS Monitor
  JHU Press, p. 187, ISBN 9780801862502, Book (par view)
- —— (2012) Iron Coffin: War, Technology, and Experience aboard the USS Monitor
  JHU Press, p. 208, ISBN 9781421405209, Book (par view)
- Mokin, Arthur (1991). Ironclad: the Monitor and the Merrimack
  Presidio Press, p. 274, ISBN 9780891414056, Book (snippit view)
- Nelson, James L. (2009). Reign of Iron:The Story of the First Battling Ironclads, the Monitor and the Merrimack.

Harper – Collins, New York. p. 400, Book (par view)

- Norris, William (1879). The Story of the Confederate States' Ship "Virginia" (once Merrimac): Her Victory Over the Monitor ...1862
  John B. Piet, Publisher, p. 29, E'book
- Park, Carl D. (2007). Ironclad Down: The USS Merrimack-CSS Virginia from Construction to Destruction.
  Naval Institute Press. p. 238. ISBN 9781591146599., Book (par view)
- Quarstein, John V. (2012). CSS Virginia: Sink Before Surrender
  The History Press, p. 591, ISBN 9781609495800, (par view)
- —— (2010). The Monitor Boys: The Crew of the Union's First Ironclad
  The History Press, p. 349, ISBN 9781596294554, Book (par view)
- —— (2006). A History of Ironclads: The Power of Iron Over WoodThe History Press, p. 284, ISBN 9781596291188, Book (par view)
- —— (2000). C.S.S. Virginia, Mistress of Hampton Roads
  Self-published for the Virginia Civil War Battles and Leaders Series. ISBN 1-56190-118-0, Book (par view)
- —— (1999). The Battle of the Ironclads
  Arcadia Publishing, p. 128, ISBN 9780738501130, Book (par view)
- —— (1997). The Civil War On The Virginia Peninsula
  Arcadia Publishing, p. 128, ISBN 9780738544380, Book (par view)
- Rawson, Edward K.; Woods, Robert H. (1897). Official Records of the Union and Confederate Navies in the War of the Rebellion.
  Government Printing Office, Secretary of the Navy John D. Long, Washington., E'book
- Sheridan, Robert E. (2004). Iron from the Deep: The Discovery and Recovery of the USS Monitor
  Naval Institute Press, p. 261, ISBN 9781557504135, Book (par view)
- Snow, Richard (2016). Iron Dawn: The Monitor, the Merrimack, and the Civil War Sea Battle that Changed History. Simon and Schuste. ISBN 978-1-4767-9420-4.
- Still, William N.; Hill, Dina B. (1988). Ironclad Captains: The Commanding Officers of the U.S.S. Monitor. National Oceanic and Atmospheric Administration, U.S. Government Printing Office, Washington, D.C. p. 83.
- Thompson, Stephen C. (1990). The Design and Construction of the USS Monitor (journal: Warship International, volume=XXVII, issue 3, pp. 222–242)
  International Naval Research Organization, Toledo, Ohio, ISSN 0043-0374
- Thulesius, Olav (2007). The Man who Made the Monitor: A Biography of John Ericsson, Naval Engineer. Jefferson, North Carolina:
  McFarland & Company, Inc., Publishers. p. 255. ISBN 9780786427666., Book (par view)
- Tindall, William (1923). The True Story of the Virginia and the Monitor: The Account of an Eye-witness
  Old Dominion Press, Incorporated, p. 90, Book (par view)
- White, William Chapman; White, Ruth Morris (1957). Tin can on a shingle
  Dutton Publishers, p. 176 pages, Book
- Worden, John Lorimer; Greene, Samuel Dana; Ramsay, H. Ashton; Watson, Eugene Winslow (1912). P : The Monitor and the Merrimac: both sides of the story. New York, London: Harper and Brothers. p. 72., E'book
Top

== Spanish–American War ~ George Dewey ==
- Alger, Russell Alexander, (1901). N. The Spanish–American War

BiblioBazaar. p. 465. ISBN 1175492116 Book (par view)

- Alvarez, Jose M., (1991). The Spanish–American War: An Annotated Bibliography

U.S. Army War College. Book (no view)

- Chadwick, French Ensor, (1911). N The relations of the United States and Spain: the Spanish–American War, Volume 1,

Charles Scribner's Sons, New York p. 412, E'book

- Clemens, William Montgomery, (1899). Life of Admiral George Dewey, Volume 20,

Street & Smith, New York. p. 196 Url

- Dewey, George (1913).P : Autobiography of George Dewey: Admiral of the navy,

Charles Scribner, New York. p. 337. ISBN 0807100781 Url

- Lawrence, William J. Lawrence (2010). A Concise Life of Admiral George Dewey, U S N

BiblioBazaar, p. 72. ISBN 1175492116 Url

- Mahan, Alfred Thayer (1899). Lessons of the war with Spain: and other articles,

Little, Brown Low, Boston, p. 320, Url

- Palmer, Frederick (1899). George Dewey, Admiral: impressions of Dewey and the Olympia on their homeward progress from Manila,

Doubleday & McClure co., New York. p. 217 Url

- Paterson, Thomas G. (1998). U.S. Intervention in Cuba, 1898: Interpreting the Spanish–American–Cuban–Filipino War,

Magazine of History, Vol. 12, No. 3, The War of 1898 (Spring, 1998), p. 5–10 Organization of American Historians. p. 10 Url

- Spector, Ronald H. (1974). Admiral of the new empire: the life and career of George Dewey

Louisiana State University Press. p. 220, ISBN 0807100781, Url

- Tucker, Spencer, (2009). The Encyclopedia of the Spanish–American and Philippine–American Wars: A Political, Social, and Military History, Volume 1

ABC-CLIO,. p. 993. ISBN 1851099514, Url

- West, Richard Sedgewick (1948). Admirals of American empire: the combined story of George Dewey, Alfred Thayer Mahan, Winfield Scott Schley and William Thomas SampsonBobbs,

Merrill Co; Original, University of Michigan. p. 354, Url

== Other naval history ==
- Allen, Gardner Weld (1929). Our Navy and the West Indian Pirates
  Essex Institute, p. 107, Book (snippit view)
- Boot, Max (2007). The Savage Wars Of Peace: Small Wars And The Rise Of American Power
  Basic Books, p. 728, ISBN 9780465004706, Book (no view)
- Bradlee, Francis Boardman Crowninshield (1923). Piracy in the West Indies and Its Suppression
  Essex Institute, p. 220, Book (snippit view)
- Dow, George Francis (2002). Slave Ships and Slaving.
  Courier Dover Publications, New York. p. 396. ISBN 0-486-42111-2. Url
- Du Bois, William Edward Burghardt (1904). The suppression of the African slave-trade to the United States of America.
  Longmans, Green and Co., New York, London. pp. 335. Url
- Exquemelin, Alexandre Olivier; Ringrose, Basil (1893). The buccaneers of America
  S. Sonnenschein & Co., London, p. 508, E'book
- Foote, Andrew Hull (1854). Africa and the American flag. D. Appleton & Co., New York. p. 390. E'book
- Konstam, Angus (2007). Predators of the Seas
  Skyhorse Publishing Inc., p. 240, ISBN 9781602390355, Url
- Footner, Geoffrey Marsh (2003). USS Constellation: From Frigate to Sloop of War
  Naval Institute Press, p. 367, ISBN 9781557502841, Url
- Gardiner, Robert, (2006). "Frigates of the Napoleonic Wars",
  Naval Institute Press, p. 208, Url
- Thiers, Adolphe Joseph. History of the Consulate and the Empire of France Under Napoleon.
  Henry G. Bohn, London, 1850. E'book
- United States Congress, ed. (1858). Congressional Edition, 1858.
  William A. Harris, Washington. p. 390. E'book

== See also ==
- List of bibliographies on American history
- Bibliography of 18th-19th century Royal Naval history
- List of naval battles in the American Revolution
- List of ships captured in the 18th century
- List of ships captured in the 19th century
- List of sea captains
- List of single-ship actions
- List of United States state navies in the American Revolutionary War
- Glossary of nautical terms (disambiguation)
