= Frances Gardiner Davenport =

American historian

Frances Gardiner Davenport (April 30, 1870 in Stamford, Connecticut– November 11, 1927) was an American historian who specialized in the later Middle Ages and the European colonization of the New World.

== Early life ==
Born in 1870, Davenport was educated at Barnard College and Radcliffe, after which she pursued advanced studies in England before in 1904 graduating Ph.D. from the University of Chicago.

== Career ==
Davenport's first published work was a classified list of printed sources for English manorial and agrarian history during the Middle Ages, produced under the supervision of William Ashley of Harvard. Her later work on English history included The Economic Development of a Norfolk Manor 1086–1565, published by the Cambridge University Press in 1906. Over many years she edited her magnum opus, the work finally published by the Carnegie Institution as European Treaties Bearing on the History of the United States and its Dependencies to 1648 (1917), and as a second volume covering the years 1650 to 1697 (1929), and was still working on further volumes when she died on November 11, 1927. These were completed by Charles O. Paullin.

== Selected publications ==
- Frances Gardiner Davenport, A Classified List of Printed Original Materials for English Manorial and Agrarian History During the Middle Ages (Burt Franklin Bibliography and Reference Series, No.53, 1894)
- Frances Gardiner Davenport, The Economic Development of a Norfolk Manor, 1086–1565 (Cambridge: Cambridge University Press, 1906)
- Frances Gardiner Davenport, ed., European Treaties Bearing on the History of the United States and its Dependencies to 1648 (1917)
- Autobiography of Frances Gardiner Davenport, 1890–1920 (undated, c. 1928, booklet of 19 pages)
- Frances Gardiner Davenport, ed., European Treaties Bearing on the History of the United States and its Dependencies 1650–1697 (1929)
- Frances Gardiner Davenport & Charles O. Paullin, eds., European Treaties Bearing on the History of the United States and its Dependencies: Volume III
- Frances Gardiner Davenport & Charles O. Paullin, eds., European Treaties Bearing on the History of the United States and Its Dependencies: Volume IV 1716–1815
