= Charles O. Paullin =

Naval historian

Charles Oscar Paullin (20 July 1869 – 1 September 1944) was an important naval historian, who made a significant early contribution to the administrative history of the United States Navy.

== Early life and education ==
Raised in Greene County, Ohio, Paullin attended Antioch College from 1890 to 1893, but before his graduation transferred for his final year at Union Christian College, Merom, where he took his Bachelor of Science degree in 1893. He then taught mathematics at Kee Mar College in Hagerstown, Maryland, in 1893–94, before beginning his graduate studies at the Johns Hopkins University in 1894–1895. While employed from 1896 to 1900 at the U.S. Naval Hydrographic Office, he also earned a degree in social sciences at the Catholic University of America in 1897. From 1900 to 1904, Paullin studied at the University of Chicago, where he earned his Ph.D. in 1904 with his pioneer study on the administration of the colonial navy during the Revolution, later published as The Navy of the American Revolution: Its Administration, Its Policy, and its Achievements. While at Chicago he studied the Revolutionary period under the direction of J. Franklin Jameson.

== Professional career ==
Following completion of his doctorate, he published a series of articles in the U.S. Naval Institute's Proceedings between 1905 and 1914 that constituted the first administrative history of the U.S. Navy. They were published posthumously as a book in 1968, twenty-four years after his death. Similarly, a series of articles on American Voyages to the Orient was published in 1971.

From 1910 to his retirement in 1936, Paullin served on the research staff of the Carnegie Institution. In 1911, he gave the Albert Shaw Lectures on Diplomatic History at Johns Hopkins University, which were published the following year as Diplomatic Negotiations of American Naval Officers. In 1911–1913, Paullin lectured on naval history at the George Washington University. He published his major works on naval history between 1905 and 1918. In 1933, Columbia University awarded Paullin and John Kirtland Wright the Loubat Prize for their Atlas of the Historical Geography of the United States (1932). He died in Washington, D.C., in 1944, and is buried in Rock Creek Cemetery there.

Paullin's papers are in the Library of Congress, and include 1,459 maps on tracing paper used as compilation materials for the Atlas of the Historical Geography.

== Published works ==
- "The Naval Administration of the Southern States During the Revolution," The Sewanee Review 10:4 (October 1902): 418–428.
- The Navy of the American Revolution: its Administration, its Policy and its Achievements. Chicago: The Burrows Brothers Co., 1906; New York, Haskell House Publishers, 1971.
- Services of Commodore John Rodgers in the War of 1812 (1812–1815). Annapolis, 1909
- "President Lincoln and the Navy," American Historical Review 14:2 (January 1909): 284–303.
- Commodore John Rodgers; captain, commodore, and senior officer of the American Navy, 1773-1838. Cleveland, O., The Arthur H. Clark Company, 1910; Annapolis, U.S. Naval Institute, 1967; New York : Arno Press, 1980.
- Diplomatic Negotiations of American Naval Officers, 1778-1883, The Albert Shaw Lectures on Diplomatic History, 1911. (Baltimore: The Johns Hopkins University Press, 1912; Gloucester, Mass.: Peter Smith, 1967)
- The Battle of Lake Erie, edited by C.O. Paullin. Cleveland, Ohio: Rowfant Club, 1918.
- Out-letters of the Continental Marine Committee and Board of Admiralty, August, 1776-September, 1780, edited by Charles Oscar Paullin. New York, Printed for the Naval History Society by the De Vinne Press, 1914.
- Guide to the materials in London archives for the history of the United States since 1783, by Charles O. Paullin and Frederic L. Paxson. Washington, D.C. : Carnegie Institution of Washington, 1914.
- European treaties bearing on the history of the United States and its dependencies ..., edited by Frances Gardiner Davenport with Charles Oscar Paullin. Washington, D.C., Carnegie Institution of Washington, 1917–37; Gloucester, Mass., P. Smith, 1967; Clark, N.J.: Lawbook Exchange, 2004.
- 'President Lincoln and the Navy.' Tarrytown, N.Y., 1930
- Atlas of the historical geography of the United States, by Charles O. Paullin; edited by John K. Wright. [Washington, D.C., New York] Pub. jointly by Carnegie institution of Washington and the American geographical society of New York, 1932; Westport, Conn.: Greenwood Press, 1975.
- The Paullin family of southern New Jersey. Washington, D.C., Mimeoform Press, 1933.
- 'History of the site of the Congressional and Folger libraries,' Washington, 1937.
- Paullin’s history of naval administration, 1775-1911: a collection of articles from the U.S. Naval Institute Proceedings. Annapolis, U.S. Naval Institute, 1968.
- American voyages to the Orient, 1690–1865; an account of merchant and naval activities in China, Japan and the various Pacific Islands. Annapolis, Md., U.S. Naval Institute [1971].

== Sources ==
- Biographic sketch in American Voyages to the Orient
- Who's Who
- Harold D. Langley, "Remembering a Forgotten Naval Historian," Naval History, vol. 22, Number 1, (February 2008), pp. 64–67.
