= Sarah Woolfolk Wiggins =

Alabama historian (1934–2020)

Sarah Van Voorhis Woolfolk Wiggins (June 29, 1934 - April 12, 2020) was a history professor at the University of Alabama in Tuscaloosa, Alabama. She was the first woman in the university's history department and edited The Alabama Review for 20 years.

She was born in Montgomery, Alabama. She studied at Huntingdon College and then Louisiana State University under professor T. Harry Williams. She married and had children. She raised them on her own after her husband died.

In the 1960s and 1970s she wrote several articles and a book on Reconstruction era politics in Alabama.

== Bibliography ==
- The Role of the Scalawag in Alabama Reconstruction by Sarah Woolfolk Wiggins, Louisiana State University, 1965
- The Scalawag In Alabama Politics, 1865–1881 by Sarah Woolfolk Wiggins, University of Alabama Press, July 30, 1977
- "Amelia Gayle Gorgas: A Victorian Mother." In Stepping Out of the Shadows: Alabama Women, 1819-1990, edited by Mary Martha Thomas. Tuscaloosa: The University of Alabama Press, 1995. pp 57–74.
- Love and Duty: Amelia and Josiah Gorgas and Their Family by Sarah Woolfolk Wiggins, University of Alabama Press, 2005
- The Journal of Sarah Haynsworth Gayle, 1827–1835: A Substitute for Social Intercourse edited by Sarah Woolfolk Wiggins with Ruth Truss Smith, University of Alabama Press, November 5, 2013
