= Pirates, Privateers, and Rebel Raiders of the Carolina Coast =

2000 book

- Author: Lindley S. Butler
- Genre: Non-fiction
- Published: 2000
- Publisher: University of North Carolina Press

Pirates, Privateers, and Rebel Raiders of the Carolina Coast is a book by Lindley S. Butler.

== Synopsis ==
The book includes eight biographies that relate to the history of pirates and blockade runners on the coast of North Carolina from the 18th century until the American Civil War.

== Reception ==
The book received mostly positive reviews from critics. Publishers Weekly wrote that "Butler vividly recounts the deeds of this group of men, chronicles their lives and ultimate fates and, in general, provides an eminently readable and accurate tale of the region's rascals."

Marcus Rediker, in the Journal of Southern history, called it "insufficiently analytical, somewhat narrow, and too inattentive to broad economic, political, social, and cultural issues and themes. Yet by combining two popular traditional genres, biography and maritime history, and by emphasizing drama and adventure, Pirates, Privateers, and Rebel Raiders of the Carolina Coast will surely appeal to many general readers".
