= James Barnes (author) =

American writer

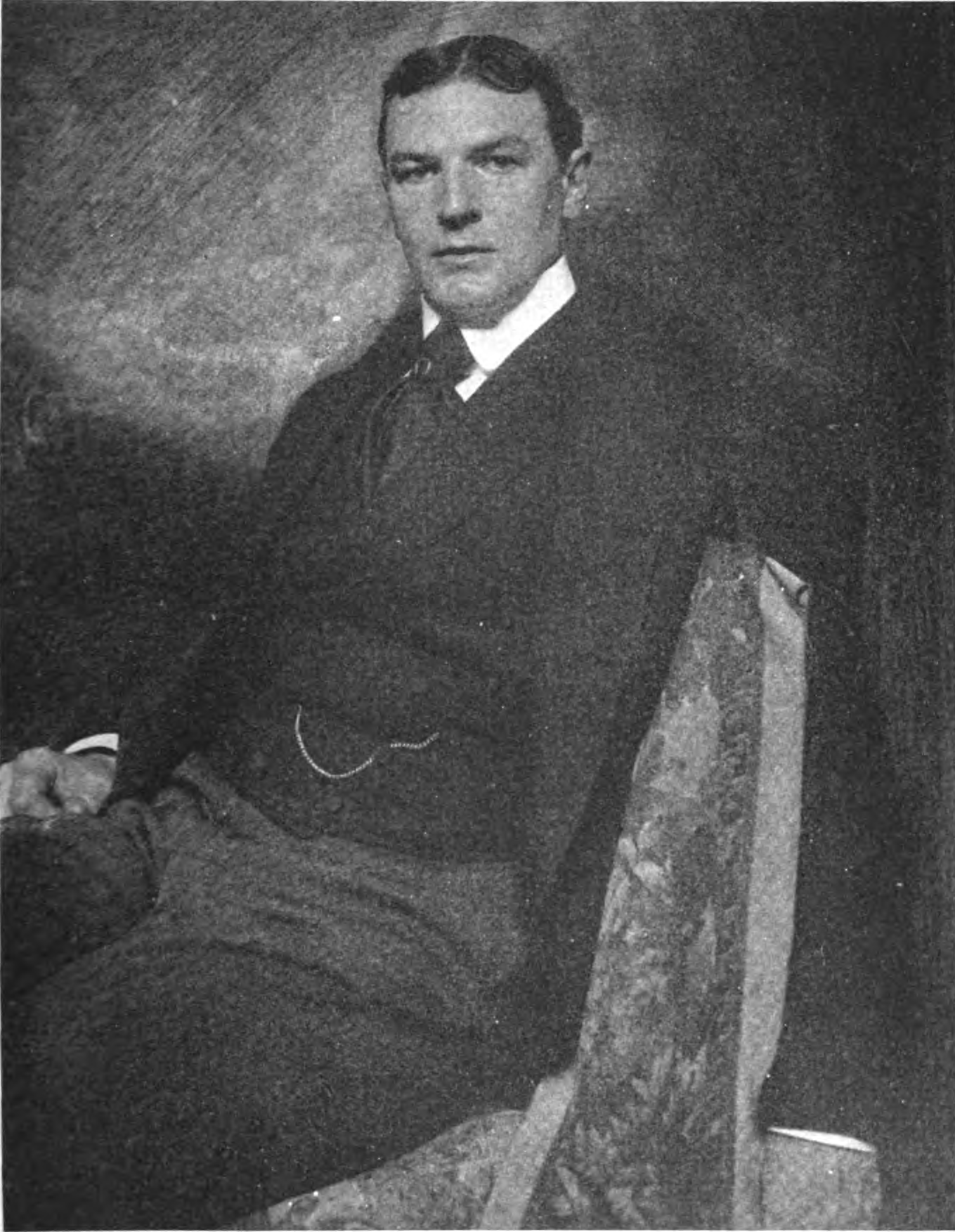
- Born: 19 September 1866; Annapolis
- Died: 30 April 1936; Princeton Hospital
- Resting place: Woodlawn Cemetery

James Barnes (19 September 1866 – 30 April 1936) was an American author.

== Biography ==
The son of naval officer, lawyer, and collector John Sanford Barnes, he was born at Annapolis, Maryland on September 19, 1866. He attended St. Paul's School and the Pingry School, before graduating from Princeton in 1891. While at Princeton, he was editor of the literary magazine The Nassau, and president of the Princeton Drama Association. After his graduation, Barnes served on the staff of Scribner's Magazine and as assistant editor of Harper's Weekly. During the Spanish–American War he served in the Naval Reserve. From 1899 to 1901 he was a war correspondent for The Outlook covering the Boer War in South Africa; and from 1905 to 1908 was editor of Appleton's Booklover's Magazine.

Early in 1914, Barnes conducted a photographic expedition across Africa from the Indian Ocean to the mouth of the Congo River, under the auspices of the American Museum of Natural History. During World War I he did important war work as head of the Princeton Aviation School for several months, and major of the Aviation Section of the Signal Corps of the United States Reserve. He was head of the photographic division of the army and was sent to France, as commander of the United States School of Aërial Photography, to organize that work at the front.

From 1918 until his death, Barnes served as president of the Naval History Society, and on its Board of Managers.

He died at Princeton Hospital on April 30, 1936, and was buried at Woodlawn Cemetery in The Bronx.

== Works ==
- For King or Country: A Story of the American Revolution (1896)
- Midshipman Farragut (1896)
- Naval Actions of the War of 1812 (1896)
- The Beginnings of the American Navy (1897)
- Commodore Bainbridge: From the Gunroom to the Quarter-Deck (1897)
- A Loyal Traitor: A Story of the War of 1812 (1897)
- A Princetonian: A Story of Undergraduate Life at the College of New Jersey (1897)
- The Hero of Erie: Oliver Hazard Perry (1898)
- Yankee Ships and Yankee Sailors (1898)
- David G. Farragut (1899)
- Drake and His Yeomen (1899)
- The Great War Trek: With the British Army on the Veldt (1901)
- With the Flag in the Channel; or, The Adventures of Captain Gustavus Conyngham (1902)
- The Giant of Three Wars: A Life of General Winfield Scott (1903)
- The Son of Light Horse Harry (1904)
- The Unpardonable War (1904)
- The Blockaders (1905)
- Outside the Law (1906)
- The Clutch of Circumstance (1908)
- Rifle and Caravan (1912)
- Through Central Africa From Coast to Coast (1915)
- The Hero of Stony Point, Anthony Wayne (1916)
- The Life of William Bainbridge, Esq. of the United States Navy (1932), Princeton University Press (editor)
- From Then Till Now (1934)
