= John Lyman Book Awards =

Maritime history book award

The John Lyman Book Awards are given annually by the North American Society for Oceanic History to recognise excellence in published books making a major contribution to the study and understanding of maritime and naval history. They are named after Professor John Lyman (1915–1977) of the University of North Carolina.

== History ==
The Lyman Book Awards were inaugurated in 1995 and have honored more than 240 books from more than 80 publishers.

As of 2023, the Committee makes awards in the following eight categories:

- Maritime and Nautical Archaeology
- Maritime and Naval Biography and Autobiography
- Maritime and Naval Reference Works and Published Primary Sources
- Maritime and Naval Science and Technology
- North American Maritime History
- North American Naval History
- World Maritime History
- World Naval History

The categories of North American Maritime and North American Naval History were formerly divided among Canadian naval and maritime history, U.S. naval history, and U.S. maritime history. World Maritime History and World Naval History were formerly one category.

Maritime and Nautical Archaeology
Year	Author	Book	Publisher
2023	Dolores Elkin and Christophe Delaere, eds.	Underwater and Coastal Archaeology in Latin America	University of Florida Press
2023 Hon. mention	Warren Curtis Riess	Studying the Princess Carolina: Anatomy of the Ship That Held Up Wall Street	Texas A&M University Press
2024	Jane Webster	Materializing the Middle Passage: A Historical Archaeology of British Slave Shipping, 1680–1807	Oxford University Press
2025	Jennifer E. Jones, Della A. Scott-Ireton, and Jason T. Raupp, eds.	Citizen Science in Maritime Archaeology: Terminology, Theory, and Infrastructure	University Press of Florida
2025 Hon. mention	Jennifer E. Jones, Calvin H. Mires, and Daniel Zwick, eds.	Intertidal Shipwrecks: Management of a Historic Resource in an Unmanageable Environment.	University Press of Florida

Maritime and Naval Biography and Autobiography
Year	Author	Book	Publisher
1996	Robert Schneller	A Quest for Glory: A Biography of Rear Admiral John A. Dahlgren	Naval Institute Press
1997	Catherine Petroski	A Bride's Passage: Susan Hathorn's Year Under Sail	Northeastern University Press
1998	W. Gillies Ross	This Distant and Unsurveyed Country: A Woman's Winter at Baffin Island, 1857-58	McGill-Queen's University Press
1999	Craig Symonds	Confederate Admiral: The Life and Wars of Franklin Buchanan	Naval Institute Press
2000	Spencer Tucker	Andrew Foote: Civil War Admiral on Western Waters	Naval Institute Press
2001	John H. Schroeder	Matthew Calbraith Perry: Antebellum Sailor and Diplomat	Naval Institute Press
2003	Thomas Wildenberg	All the Factors of Victory: Admiral Joseph Mason Reeves and the Origins of Carrier Airpower	Brassey's
2004	Kathleen Broome Williams	Grace Hopper: Admiral of the Cyber Sea	Naval Institute Press
2005	Clark G. Reynolds	On the Warpath in the Pacific: Admiral Jocko Clark and the Fast Carriers	Naval Institute Press
2006	Mary Malloy	Devil on the Deep Blue Sea: The Notorious Career of Captain Samuel Hill of Boston	Bullbrier Press
2006	David Curtis Skaggs	Oliver Hazard Perry: Honor, Courage, and Patriotism in the Early U.S. Navy	Naval Institute Press
2006 Hon. mention	John H. Schroeder	Commodore John Rodgers: Paragon of the Early American Navy	University Press of Florida
2007	Stephen Fox	Wolf of the Deep: Raphael Semmes and the Notorious Confederate Raider CSS Alabama	Alfred A. Knopf
2008	David Hackett Fischer	Champlain's Dream: The Visionary Adventurer Who Made a New World in Canada	Simon and Schuster
2011	Elliot Carlson	Joe Rochefort's War: The Odyssey of the Codebreaker Who Outwitted Yamamoto at Midway	Naval Institute Press
2012 Hon. mention	Larry Berman	Zumwalt: The Life and Times of Admiral Elmo Russell “Bud” Zumwalt, Jr.	Harper
2013 Hon. mention	Geoffrey L. Rossano, ed.	Hero of the Angry Sky: The World War I Diary and Letters of David S. Ingalls, America’s First Naval Ace	Ohio University Press
2014	Lloyd J. Matthews	General Henry Lockwood of Delaware: Shipmate of Melville, Co-builder of the Naval Academy, Civil War Commander	University of Delaware Press
2015	Dennis L. Noble	The Sailor’s Homer: The Life and Times of Richard McKenna, Author of The Sand Pebbles	Naval Institute Press
2016	Tamara Plakins Thornton	Nathaniel Bowditch and the Power of Numbers: How a Nineteenth-Century Man of Business, Science, and the Sea Changed American Life	University of North Carolina Press
2017	Sheila Johnson Kindred	Jane Austen's Transatlantic Sister: The Life and Letters of Fanny Palmer Austen	McGill-Queen's University Press
2017 Hon. mention	Stan Grayson	A Man for All Oceans: Captain Joshua Slocum and the First Solo Voyage Around the World	Tilbury House Publishers/New Bedford Whaling Museum
2019 Winner	Anthony J. Connors	Went to the Devil: A Yankee Whaler in the Slave Trade	University of Massachusetts Press
2019 Hon. mention	Phillips Payson O’Brien	The Second Most Powerful Man in the World: The Life of Admiral William D. Leahy, Roosevelt's Chief of Staff	Dutton
2020	Brett Goodin	From Captives to Consuls: Three Sailors in Barbary and Their Self-Making Across the Early American Republic, 1770–1840	Johns Hopkins University Press
2021 Winner	Paul Stillwell	Battleship Commander: The Life of Vice Admiral Willis A. Lee, Jr.	Naval Institute Press
2021 Hon. mention	John B. Hattendorf & Pelham Boyer, eds.	To the Java Sea: Selections from the Diary, Reports, and Letters of Henry E. Eccles, 1940–1942	Naval War College Press
2022 Hon. mention	Ranulph Fiennes	Shackleton: The Biography	Pegasus
2022 Hon. mention	Marc Wortman	Admiral Hyman Rickover: Engineer of Power	Yale University Press
2023 Winner	Robert W. Cherny	Harry Bridges: Labor Radical, Labor Legend	University of Illinois Press
2023 Hon. mention	Margaret Willson	Woman, Captain, Rebel: The Extraordinary True Story of a Daring Icelandic Sea Captain	Sourcebooks
2024 Winner	Gelina Harlaftis	Onassis Business History, 1924—1975	Brill
2024 Hon. mention	Andrew Lipman	Squanto: A Native Odyssey	Yale University Press
2025	Craig L. Symonds	Annapolis Goes to War: The Naval Academy Class of 1940 and Its Trial by Fire in World War II	Oxford University Press

Maritime and Naval Reference Works and Published Primary Sources
Year	Author	Book	Publisher
1995	Craig L. Symonds	The Naval Institute's Historical Atlas of U.S. Navy	Naval Institute Press
1996	Michael J. Crawford, ed.	The Naval Documents of the American Revolution, vol. 10	Naval Historical Center
1997	Briton C. Busch & Barry M. Gough, eds.	Fur Traders from New England: The Boston Men in the North Pacific, 1787–1800	Arthur H. Clark
1998	Robert Randolph Carter, Harold B. Gill, Jr. & Joanne Young	Searching for the Franklin Expedition: The Arctic Journal of Robert Randolph Carter	Naval Institute Press
1999	Robert J. Cressman	The Official Chronology of the U.S. Navy in World War II	Naval Institute Press
2000	David Freeman	Canadian Warship Names	Vanwell
2001	No award		
2002	Michael J. Crawford, ed.	The Naval War of 1812: A Documentary History, vol. 3	Naval Historical Center
2003	C. Herbert Gilliland	Voyage to a Thousand Cares: Master's Mate Lawrence with the African Squadron, 1844–1846	Naval Institute Press
2004	W.H. Bunting	Sea Struck	Martha's Vineyard Historical Society
2005	No award		
2006 Winner	Ralph Sessions	The Shipcarvers' Art: Figureheads and Cigar-Store Indians in Nineteenth-Century America	Princeton University Press
2006 Hon. mention	C. Danial Elliott, with Everett C. Wilkie, Jr. & Richard Ring	Maritime History: A Hand-list of the Collection in the John Carter Brown Library (1474 to ca. 1860), revd. ed.	John Carter Brown Library
2007 Winner	John B. Hattendorf, Editor in Chief	The Oxford Encyclopedia of Maritime History, 4 vols.	Oxford University Press
2007 Hon. mention	Deidre Simmons	Keepers of the Record: The History of the Hudson's Bay Company Archives	McGill-Queen's University Press
2008 Winner	George J. Billy & Christine M. Billy	Merchant Mariners at War: An Oral History of World War II	University Press of Florida
2008 Hon. mention	Robert Eric Barde	Immigration at the Golden Gate: Passenger Ships, Exclusion, and Angel Island	Praeger
2009	Yonah Alexander	Terror on the High Seas: From Piracy to Strategic Challenge	Praeger Security International
2010	No award		
2011	Gordon Miller	Voyages: To the New World and Beyond	University of Washington Press
2012 Winner	Jonathan C. Kinghorn	The Atlantic Transport Line, 1881–1931: A History With Details on All Ships	McFarland
2012 Hon. mention	John D. Broadwater	USS Monitor: A Historic Ship Completes its Final Voyage	Texas A&M University Press
2013 Hon. mention	John A. Wolter, David A. Ranzan, & John J. McDonough, eds.	With Commodore Perry to Japan: The Journal of William Speiden, Jr., 1852–1855	Naval Institute Press
2014	Nancy Shoemaker, ed.	Living With Whales: Documents and Oral Histories of Native New England Whaling History	University of Massachusetts Press
2015	Mark L. Evans & Roy A. Grossnick	United States Naval Aviation 1910–2010	Naval History & Heritage Command
2016 Winner	Rebecca Huycke Ellison	Daniel O. Killman’s Forty Years Master: A Life in Sail & Steam	McFarland
2016 Hon. mention	Jun Kimura	Archaeology of East Asian Shipbuilding	University Press of Florida
2017 Hon. mention	Alicia Caporaso, ed.	Formation Processes of Maritime Archaeological Landscapes	Society for Historical Archaeology/Springer
2018 Hon. mention	Anna Gibson Holloway & Jonathan W. White	"Our Little Monitor": The Greatest Invention of the Civil War	Kent State University Press
2019	Ken W. Sayers	U.S. Navy Auxiliary Vessels: A History and Directory from World War I to Today	McFarland
2020	No award		
2021 Winner	William N. Still & Richard A. Stephenson	Shipbuilding in North Carolina, 1688–1918	North Carolina Office of Archives & History
2021 Hon. mention	Nathan Lipfert	Two Centuries of Maine Shipbuilding: A Visual History	Down East Books
2022 Winner	Robert G. Allan, with Peter A. Robson	Workboats for the World: The Robert Allan Story	Harbour
2022 Hon. mention	Russell A. Potter, Regina Koellner, Peter Carney, & Mary Williamson, eds.	"May We Be Spared to Meet on Earth": Letters of the Lost Franklin Arctic Expedition	McGill-Queen’s University Press
2023 Co-Winners	Ryan Tucker Jones & Matt K. Matsuda, eds.	The Cambridge History of the Pacific Ocean, vol. 1, The Pacific Ocean to 1800	Cambridge University Press
2023 Co-Winners	Anne Perez Hattori & Jane Samson, eds.	The Cambridge History of the Pacific Ocean, vol. 2, The Pacific Ocean since 1800	Cambridge University Press
2023 Co-Winners	Christine F. Hughes & Charles E. Brodine, Jr., eds.	The Naval War of 1812: A Documentary History, vol. 4, 1814–1815 (Atlantic, Gulf Coast)	Naval History & Heritage Command
2024 Winner	Katelynn A. Hatton and Alex Christopher Meekins, eds.	North Carolina Troops, 1861–1865: A Roster, vol. 22: Confederate States Navy, Confederate States Marine Corps, and Charlotte Naval Yard	North Carolina Office of Archives and History
2024 Hon. mention	Robert F. Weir, ed. by Andrew W. German	The Watch’s Wild Cry: A Voyage Aboard the Whaling Vessel Clara Bell	Lyons Press
2025	Richard H. Gimblett and Karl Gagnon	Guardians of the North: Canadian Warships and Maritime Aircraft, 1910–2025	Dundurn Press
2025 Hon. mention	Hubert Sagnières	For Glory, Not Gold: Expeditions through Arctic Lands 1818–1876	Flammarion

Maritime and Naval Science, Technology, and Environment
Year	Author	Book	Publisher
1995	Harold D. Langley	History of Medicine in the Early U.S. Navy	Johns Hopkins University Press
1997	Thomas R. Heinrich	Ships for the Seven Seas: Philadelphia Shipbuilding in the Age of Industrial Capitalism	Johns Hopkins University Press
2001	Gary E. Weir	An Ocean in Common: American Naval Officers, Scientists, and the Ocean Environment	Texas A&M University Press
2002	Steven J. Dick	Sky and Ocean Joined: The U.S. Naval Observatory, 1830–2000	Cambridge University Press
2002	William H. Roberts	Civil War Ironclads	Johns Hopkins University Press
2004 Hon. mention	Marc Levinson	The Box: How the Shipping Container Made the World Smaller and the World Economy Bigger	Princeton University Press
2005	Helen M. Rozwadowski	Fathoming the Ocean: The Discovery and Exploration of the Deep Sea	Belknap Press of Harvard University Press
2006	Anthony Newpower	Iron Men and Tin Fish: The Race to Build a Better Torpedo during World War II	Praeger Security International
2007	Larrie D. Ferreiro	Ships and Science: The Birth of Naval Architecture in the Scientific Revolution, 1600–1800	MIT Press
2008	Gary Kroll	America's Ocean Wilderness: A Cultural History of Twentieth-Century Exploration	University Press of Kansas
2008 Hon. mention	Russell A. Potter	Arctic Spectacles: The Frozen North in Visual Culture, 1818–1875	University of Washington Press
2009	Eric L. Mills	The Fluid Envelope of our Planet: How the Study of Ocean Currents Became a Science	University of Toronto Press
2010	Susan Casey	The Wave: In Pursuit of the Rogues, Freaks, and Giants of the Ocean	Anchor
2011	Stephen J. Hornsby	Surveyors of Empire: Samuel Holland, J.F.W. Des Barres, and the Making of the Atlantic Neptune	McGill-Queen's University Press
2012	Lissa K. Wadewitz	The Nature of Borders: Salmon, Boundaries, and Bandits on the Salish Sea	University of Washington Press
2013	Kurkpatrick Dorsey	Whales and Nations: Environmental Diplomacy on the High Seas	University of Washington Press
2014 Winner	Norman Friedman	Fighting the Great War at Sea: Strategy, Tactics and Technology	Naval Institute Press
2014 Hon. mention	John Maxtone-Graham	SS United States: Red, White, & Blue Riband	W.W. Norton
2014 Hon. mention	Michael A. Osborne	The Emergence of Tropical Medicine in France	University of Chicago Press
2015	Wendy van Duivenvoorde	Dutch East India Company Shipbuilding: The Archaeological Study of Batavia and Other Seventeenth-Century VOC Ships	Texas A&M University Press
2016	Jennifer Hubbard, David J. Wildish, & Robert L. Stephenson	A Century of Maritime Science: The St. Andrews Biological Station	University of Toronto Press
2016 Hon. mention	William Barr, trans. & ed.	Emil Bessels’ Polaris: The Chief Scientist's Recollections of the American North Pole Expedition, 1871–1873	University of Calgary Press
2017	Charles W. J. Withers	Zero Degrees: Geographies of the Prime Meridien	Harvard University Press
2017 Hon. mention	Peter Wadhams	A Farewell to Ice: A Report from the Arctic	Oxford University Press
2018 Winner	Jason W. Smith	To Master the Boundless Sea: The U.S. Navy, the Marine Environment, and the Cartography of Empire	University of North Carolina Press
2018 Hon. mention	Roger C. Smith, ed.	Florida's Lost Galleon: The Emanuel Point Shipwreck	University Press of Florida
2019 Winner	Margaret E. Schotte	Sailing School: Navigating Science and Skill, 1500–1800	Johns Hopkins University Press
2019 Hon. mention	Richard J. King	Ahab's Rolling Sea: A Natural History of Moby-Dick	University of Chicago Press
2020	Larrie Ferreiro	Bridging the Seas: The Rise of Naval Architecture in the Industrial Age, 1800–2000	MIT Press
2021	Norman Polmar & Lee J. Mathers	Opening the Great Depths: The Bathyscaph Trieste and Pioneers of Undersea Exploration	Naval Institute Press
2022 Winner	Graham Bell	Full Fathom 5000: The Expedition of HMS Challenger and the Strange Animals It Found in the Deep Sea	Oxford University Press
2022 Hon. Mention	Martin V. Melosi	Water in North American Environmental History	Routledge
2023 Winner	Fynn Holm	The Gods of the Sea: Whales and Coastal Communities in Northeast Japan, c. 1600–2019	Cambridge University Press
2023 Hon. mention	Laura Trethewey	The Deepest Map: The High-Stakes Race to Chart the World’s Oceans	Harper Wave; Goose Lane
2024 Winner	Tyler A. Pitrof	Too Far on a Whim: The Limits of High-Steam Propulsion in the US Navy	University of Alabama Press
2024 Hon. mention	Daniel Macfarlane	The Lives of Lake Ontario: An Environmental History	McGill-Queens University Press
2025	No award		

North American Maritime History
Year	Author	Book	Publisher
2023 Winner	Thomas Blake Earle	The Liberty to Take Fish: Atlantic Fisheries and Federal Power in Nineteenth-Century America	Cornell University Press
2023 Hon. mention	Sean M. Kelley	American Slavers: Merchants, Mariners, and the Transatlantic Commerce in Captives, 1644–1865	Yale University Press
2024 Winner	Jeff Forret	The Price They Paid: Slavery, Shipwrecks, and Reparations Before the Civil War	The New Press
2024 Hon. mention	Susan Gaunt Stearns	Empire of Commerce: The Closing of the Mississippi and the Opening of Atlantic Trade	University of Virginia Press
2025	Jack Bouchard	Terra Nova: Food, Water, and Work in an Early Atlantic World	Yale University Press
2025 Hon. mention	Eric Takakjian and Randall Peffer	Yarmouth Castle Burning: The Deadliest Passenger Ship Disaster off the Coast of the United States Since 1934	Schiffer

North American Naval History
Year	Author	Book	Publisher
2023 Winner	Stan Fisher	Sustaining the Carrier War: The Deployment of U.S. Naval Air Power to the Pacific	Naval Institute Press
2023 Hon. mention	Philip Reid	A Boston Schooner in the Royal Navy, 1768–1772: Commerce and Conflict in Maritime British America	Boydell & Brewer
2024 Co-winner	Randy Carol Goguen	From Yeomanettes to Fighter Jets: A Century of Women in the U.S. Navy	Naval Institute Press
2024 Co-winner	Abigail G. Mullen	To Fix a National Character: The United States in the First Barbary War, 1800–1805	Johns Hopkins University Press
2025	Thomas M. Jamison	The Pacific’s New Navies: An Ocean, its Wars, and the Making of US Sea Power	Cambridge University Press
2025 Hon. mention	Benjamin C. Schaffer	The First Fleets: Colonial Navies of the British Atlantic World, 1630–1775	University of Alabama Press

World Maritime History
Year	Author	Book	Publisher
2023 Winner	Lucia Carminati	Seeking Bread and Fortune in Port Said: Labor Migration and the Making of the Suez Canal, 1859–1906	University of California Press
2024 Winner	Mary E. Hicks	Captive Cosmopolitans: Black Mariners and the World of South Atlantic Slavery	University of North Carolina Press
2024 Hon. mention	Li Tana	A Maritime Vietnam: From Earliest Times to the Nineteenth Century	Cambridge University Press
2025	Casey Schmitt	The Predatory Sea: Human Trafficking and Captivity in the Seventeenth-Century Caribbean	University of Pennsylvania Press

World Naval History
Year	Author	Book	Publisher
2023 Winner	Jon Wise	The Royal Navy and Fishery Protection: From the Fourteenth Century to the Present	Seaforth
2023 Hon. mention	Sara Caputo	Foreign Jack Tars: The British Navy and Transnational Seafarers during the Revolutionary and Napoleonic Wars	Cambridge University Press
2024 Winner	Kuan-Jen Chen	Charting America’s Cold War Waters in East Asia: Sovereignty, Local Interests, and International Security	Cambridge University Press
2024 Hon. mention	Nick Hewitt	Normandy: The Sailors’ Story: A Naval History of D-Day and the Battle for France	Yale University Press
2025	Callum Easton	The 1797 Naval Mutinies and Popular Protest in Britain: Negotiation through Collective Action	Palgrave Macmillan
2025 Hon. mention	Evan Wilson and Paul M. Kennedy, eds.	Planning for War at Sea: 400 Years of Great Power Competition	Naval Institute Press

Discontinued Categories

Canadian Naval and Maritime History
Year of Publication	Author	Book	Publisher
1995	James Pritchard	Anatomy of a Naval Disaster: The 1746 French Expedition to North America	McGill-Queen's University Press
1996	Michael L. Hadley, Rob Huebert, & Fred W. Crickard, eds.	A Nation's Navy: In Quest of Canadian Naval Identity	McGill Queen's University Press
1997	Peter E. Pope	The Many Landfalls of John Cabot	University of Toronto Press
1998	Robert Malcomson	Lords of the Lake: The Naval War on Lake Ontario, 1812–1814	Robin Brass Studio
1999	James P. Delgado	Across the Top of the World: The Quest for the Northwest Passage	Checkmark Books
2000	Arnold Hague	Allied Convoy System, 1939–1945	Vanwell; Chatham; Naval Institute Press
2001	Robert Malcomson	Warships of the Great Lakes, 1754–1834	Chatham; Naval Institute Press
2002	John Griffith Armstrong	The Halifax Explosion and the Royal Canadian Navy	University of British Columbia Press
2003	Julian Gywn	Frigates and Foremasts: The North American Squadron in Nova Scotia Waters, 1745–1815	University of British Columbia Press
2004 Winner	Peter E. Pope	Fish into Wine: The Newfoundland Plantation in the Seventeenth Century	University of North Carolina Press
2004 Hon. mention	Fraser M. McKee	"Sink all the shipping there": The Wartime Loss of Canada's Merchant Ships and Fishing Schooners	Vanwell
2005 Winner	Stuart E. Jenness	The Making of an Explorer: George Hubert Wilkins and the Canadian Arctic Expedition 1913–1916	McGill-Queen's University Press
2005 Hon. mention	Jonathan R. Dull	The French Navy and the Seven Years' War	University of Nebraska Press
2006 Winner	Jennifer M. Hubbard	A Science on the Scales: The Rise of Canadian Atlantic Fisheries Biology, 1898–1939	University of Toronto Press
2006 Hon. mention	Barry Gough	Through Water, Ice and Fire: Schooner Nancy of the War of 1812	Dundurn
2007	Barry Gough	Fortune's River: The Collision of Empires in Northwest America	Harbour
2008 Winner	Robert Malcomson	Capital in Flames: The American Attack on York, 1813	Robin Brass Studio; Naval Institute Press
2008 Hon. mention	Freeman M. Tovell	At the Far Reaches of Empire: The Life of Juan Francisco de la Bodega y Quadra	University British Columbia Press
2009	Aaron Plamondon	The Politics of Procurement: Military Acquisitions in Canada and the Sea King Helicopter	University of Chicago Press
2010	No award		
2011	James S. Pritchard	A Bridge of Ships: Canadian Shipbuilding During the Second World War	McGill-Queen’s University Press
2012 Winner	Nicholas Tracy	A Two-Edged Sword: The Navy As an Instrument of Canadian Foreign Policy	McGill-Queen’s University Press
2012 Hon. mention	Barry Gough	Juan de Fuca’s Strait: Voyages in the Waterway of Forgotten Dreams	Harbour
2013	John English	Ice and Water: Politics, Peoples, and the Arctic Council	Allen Lane
2014 Winner	Gordon W. Smith, ed. by P. Whitney Lackenbauer	A Historical and Legal Study of Sovereignty in the Canadian North: Terrestrial Sovereignty, 1870–1939	University of Calgary Press
2014 Hon. mention	Donald Barry, Bob Applebaum & Earl Wiseman	Fishing for a Solution: Canada's Fisheries Relations with the European Union, 1977–2013	University of Calgary Press
2015	Glen M. Stein	Discovering the North-West Passage: The Four-Year Arctic Odyssey of H.M.S. Investigator and the McClure Expedition	McFarland
2016	Joel Zemel	Scapegoat, The Extraordinary Legal Proceedings Following the 1917 Halifax Explosion	New World
2017	Jeffers Lennox	Homelands and Empire: Indigenous Spaces, Imperial Fictions, and Competition for Territory in Northeast North America, 1690–1763	University of Toronto Press
2018	Michael Palin	Erebus: One Ship, Two Epic Voyages, and the Greatest Naval Mystery of All Time	Random House Canada
2019	John M. MacFarlane & Lynn J. Salmon	Around the World in a Dugout Canoe: The Untold Story of Captain John Voss and the Tilikum	Harbour
2020	No award		
2021	Barry Gough	Possessing Meares Island: A Historian's Journey into the Past of Clayoquot Sound	Harbour

U.S. Maritime History
Year	Author	Book	Publisher
1995	William C. Fleetwood, Jr.	Tidecraft: The Boats of South Carolina, Georgia, and Northeastern Florida, 1550–1950	WBG Marine Press
1996	Wayne M. O'Leary	Maine Sea Fisheries: The Rise and Fall of a Native Industry, 1830–1890	Northeastern University Press
1997	W. Jeffrey Bolster	Black Jacks: African American Seamen in the Age of Sail	Harvard University Press
1998	Benjamin W. Labaree, William M. Fowler, Jr., John Hattendorf, Jeffrey J. Safford, Edward W. Sloan, & Andrew German	America and the Sea: A Maritime History	Mystic Seaport Museum
1999	Charles R. Schultz	Forty-Niners 'Round the Horn	University of South Carolina Press
1999 Hon. mention	Alexander Boyd Hawes	Off Soundings: Aspects of the Maritime History of Rhode Island	Posterity Press
2000	Lisa Norling	Captain Ahab Had a Wife: New England Women and the Whalefishery, 1720–1870	University of North Carolina Press
2000 Hon. mention	Ralph Linwood Snow & Douglas K. Lee	A Shipyard in Maine: Percy & Small and the Great Schooners	Tilbury House/Maine Maritime Museum
2001	Nicholas Dean	Snow Squall: The Last American Clipper Ship	Tilbury House/Maine Maritime Museum
2002	Wade G. Dudley	Splintering the Wooden Wall	Naval Institute Press
2003	ALex R. Larzelere	The Coast Guard in World War I: An Untold Story	Naval Institute Press
2004 Winner	Paul A. Gilje	Liberty on the Waterfront: American Maritime Culture in the Age of Revolution	University of Pennsylvania Press
2004 Hon. mention	James A. McMillan	The Final Victims: Foreign Slave Trade to North America, 1783–1810	University of South Carolina Press
2005 Winner	Peter L. Bernstein	Wedding of the Waters: The Erie Canal and the Making of a Great Nation	W.W. Norton
2005 Hon. mention	Edwin L. Dunbaugh	New England Steamship Company: Long Island Sound Night Boats in the Twentieth Century	University Press of Florida
2006 Winner	Joshua M. Smith	Borderland Smuggling: Patriots, Loyalists, and Illicit Trade in the Northeast, 1783–1820	University Press of Florida
2006 Hon. mention	Eric Robert Taylor	If We Must Die: Shipboard Insurrections in the Era of the Atlantic Slave Trade	Louisiana State University Press
2007	Eric Jay Dolin	Leviathan: The History of Whaling in America	W.W. Norton
2007	Donald G. Shomette	Shipwrecks, Sea Raiders, and Maritime Disasters along the Delmarva Coast, 1632–2004	Johns Hopkins University Press
2008	William E. Lass	Navigating the Missouri: Steamboating on Nature's Highway, 1819–1935	Arthur H. Clark
2008	Frances F. Dunwell	The Hudson: America's River	Columbia University Press
2009	John R. Bockstoce	Furs and Frontiers in the Far North: The Contest among Native and Foreign Nations for the Bering Strait Fur Trade	Yale University Press
2010	William S. Dudley	Maritime Maryland: A History	Johns Hopkins University Press
2011	William Michael Morgan	Pacific Gibraltar: U.S.-Japanese Rivalry over the Annexation of Hawai'i, 1885–1898	Naval Institute Press
2012 Winner	W. Jeffrey Bolster	The Mortal Sea: Fishing the Atlantic in the Age of Sail	Belknap Press of Harvard University Press
2012 Hon. mention	James P. Delgado	Misadventures of a Civil War Submarine: Iron, Guns and Pearls	Texas A&M University Press
2013 Winner	David Igler	The Great Ocean: Pacific Worlds from Captain Cook to the Gold Rush	Oxford University Press
2013 Hon. mention	Jennifer Schell	"A Bold and Hardy Race of Men”: The Lives and Literature of American Whalemen	University of Massachusetts Press
2013 Hon. mention	Denver Brunsman	The Evil Necessity: British Naval Impressment in the Eighteenth-Century Atlantic	University of Virginia Press
2014 Winner	Brian Rouleau	With Sails Whitening Every Sea: Mariners and the Making of an American Maritime Empire	Cornell University Press
2014 Hon. mention	Catherine Cangany	Frontier Seaport: Detroit's Transformation into an Atlantic Entrepôt	University of Chicago Press
2014 Hon. mention	Dane A. Morrison	True Yankees: The South Seas and The Discovery of American Identity	Johns Hopkins University Press
2015 Winner	Faye M. Kert	Privateering: Patriots and Profits in the War of 1812	Johns Hopkins University Press
2015 Hon. mention	Mark G. Hanna	Pirate Nests and the Rise of the British Empire, 1570–1740	University of North Carolina Press
2015 Hon. mention	Joshua L. Reid	The Sea is My Country: The Maritime World of the Makahs	Yale University Press
2016 Winner	Donald Grady Shomette	Privateers of the Revolution: War on the New Jersey Coast, 1775–1783	Schiffer
2016 Hon. mention	Lee Van Der Voo	The Fish Market: Inside the Big-Money Battle for the Ocean and Your Dinner Plate	St. Martin's Press
2017 Winner	S. Max Edelson	The New Map of Empire: How Britain Imagined America Before Independence	Harvard University Press
2017 Hon. mention	William M. Fowler, Jr.	Steam Titans: Cunard, Collins, and the Epic Battle for Commerce on the North Atlantic	Bloomsbury
2017 Hon. mention	Robert P. Watson	The Ghost Ship of Brooklyn: An Untold Story of the American Revolution	Da Capo Press
2018 Winner	Matthew R. Bahar	Storm of the Sea: Indians & Empires in the Atlantic's Age of Sail	Oxford University Press
2018 Hon. mention	Matthew McKenzie	Breaking the Banks: Representations and Realities in New England Fisheries, 1866–1966	University of Massachusetts Press
2019 Winner	Nancy Shoemaker	Pursuing Respect in the Cannibal Isles: Americans in Nineteenth-Century Fiji	Cornell University Press
2019 Hon. mention	James M. Lindgren	Preserving Maritime America: A Cultural History of the Nation's Great Maritime Museums	University of Massachusetts Press
2020 Winner	Jamin Wells	Shipwrecked: Coastal Disasters and the Making of the American Beach	University of North Carolina Press
2020 Hon. mention	Colin J. Davis	Contested and Dangerous Seas: North Atlantic Fishermen, Their Wives, Unions, and the Politics of Exclusion	University of Massachusetts Press
2021 Winner	Hannah Farber	Underwriters of the United States: How Insurance Shaped the American Founding	University of North Carolina Press/Omohundro Institute of Early American History and Culture
2021 Hon. mention	Timothy D. Walker, ed.	Sailing to Freedom: Maritime Dimensions of the Underground Railway	University of Massachusetts Press
2022 Winner	Gregg Andrews	Shantyboats and Roustabouts: The River Poor of St. Louis 1875–1930	Louisiana State University Press
2022 Hon. mention	Jane Hooper	Yankees in the Indian Ocean: American Commerce and Whaling, 1786–1860	Ohio University Press
2022 Hon. mention	Joshua M. Smith	Making Maine: Statehood and the War of 1812	University of Massachusetts Press

U.S. Naval History
Year	Author	Book	Publisher
1995	Charles Dana Gibson & E. Kay Gibson	Assault and Logistics: Union Army Coastal and River Operations, 1861–1866 and Dictionary of Transports and Combatant Vessels Steam and Sail Employed by the Union Army, 1861–1868	Ensign Press
1995	Jeffery G. Barlow	Revolt of the Admirals: The Fight for Naval Aviation, 1945–1950	Naval Historical Center
1996	Malcolm Muir	Black Shoes and Blue Water: Surface Warfare in the United States Navy, 1945–1975	Naval Historical Center
1997	David Curtis Skaggs & Gerard T. Altoff	A Signal Victory: The Lake Erie Campaign, 1812–1813	Naval Institute Press
1998	Jack Sweetman, ed.	Great American Naval Battles	Naval Institute Press
2000	William Henry Flayhart III	The American Line, 1871–1902	W.W. Norton
2001	Kathleen Broome Williams	Improbable Warriors: Women Scientists and the U.S. Navy in World War II	Naval Institute Press
2002	Mitchell B. Lerner	The Pueblo Incident: A Spy Ship and the Failure of American Foreign Policy	University Press of Kansas
2003	Jack Friend	West Wind, Flood Tide: The Battle of Mobile Bay	Naval Institute Press
2004 Winner	Michael J. Bennett	Union Jacks: Yankee Sailors in the Civil War	University of North Carolina Press
2004 Hon. mention	R. Blake Dunnavent	Brown Water Warfare: The U.S. Navy in Riverine Warfare and the Emergence of Tactical Doctrine, 1775–1970	University Press of Florida
2004 Hon. mention	John Darrell Sherwood	Afterburner: Naval Aviation and the Vietnam War	New York University Press
2005 Winner	Jonathan Parshall & Anthony Tully	Shattered Sword: The Untold Story of the Battle of Midway	Potomac
2005 Hon. mention	Craig L. Symonds	Decision at Sea: Five Naval Battles that Shaped American History	Oxford University Press
2006 Winner	William N. Still, Jr.	Crisis at Sea: The U.S. Navy in European Waters in World War I	University Press of Florida
2006 Hon. mention	James D. Hornfischer	Ship of Ghosts: The Story of the USS Houston, FDR's Legendary Lost Cruiser, and the Epic Saga of Her Survivors	Bantam
2007	Lisle A. Rose	Power at Sea vol. 1, The Age of Navalism, 1890–1918; vol. 2, The Breaking Storm, 1919–1945; vol. 3, A Violent Peace, 1946–2006	University of Missouri Press
2008 Winner	Craig L. Symonds	Lincoln and His Admirals	Oxford University Press
2008 Hon. mention	Howard J. Fuller	Clad in Iron: The American Civil War and the Challenge of British Naval Power	Praeger Security International
2008 Hon. mention	John T. Kuehn	Agents of Innovation: The General Board and the Design of the Fleet that Defeated the Japanese	Naval Institute Press
2009	William R. Braisted	Diplomats in Blue: U.S. Naval Officers in China, 1922–1933	University Press of Florida
2010 Winner	Albert A. Nofi	To Train The Fleet For War: The U.S. Navy Fleet Problems, 1923–1940	U.S. Naval War College Press
2011 Hon. mention	Spencer C. Tucker, ed.	The Civil War Naval Encyclopedia	ABC-CLIO
2012 Winner	David Rigby	Allied Master Strategists: The Combined Chiefs of Staff in World War II	Naval Institute Press
2012 Hon. mention	Robert Shenk	America's Black Sea Fleet: The U.S. Navy Amidst War and Revolution, 1919–1923	Naval Institute Press
2013 Winner	Thomas Wildenberg	Billy Mitchell's War with the Navy: The Interwar Rivalry over Air Power	Naval Institute Press [2014]
2013 Hon. mention	Matthew Taylor Raffety	The Republic Afloat: Law, Honor, and Citizenship in Maritime America	University of Chicago Press
2014 Winner	David J. Bercuson & Holger Herwig	Long Night of the Tankers: Hitler's War Against Caribbean Oil	University of Calgary Press
2014 Hon. mention	Kevin J. Crisman, ed.	Coffins of the Brave: Lake Shipwrecks of the War of 1812	Texas A&M University Press
2015	John Darrell Sherwood	War in the Shallows: U.S. Navy Coastal and Riverine Warfare in Vietnam, 1965–1968	Naval History & Heritage Command
2016 Winner	Paul E. Pedisich	Congress Buys a Navy: Politics, Economics, and the Rise of American Naval Power, 1881–1921	Naval Institute Press
2016 Hon. mention	Lisle A. Rose	Seas, Skies, and Submarines: America's Sailors in the Great War	University of Missouri Press
2017 Winner	Gary J. Ohls	American Amphibious Warfare: The Roots of Tradition to 1865	Naval Institute Press
2017 Hon. mention	Donald M. Kehn, Jr.	In the Highest Degree Tragic: The Sacrifice of the U.S. Asiatic Fleet in the East Indies during World War II	University of Nebraska Press
2018 Winner	Christopher McKee	Ungentle Goodnights: Life in a Home for Elderly and Disabled Naval Sailors and Marines and the Perilous Seafaring Careers That Brought Them There	Naval Institute Press
2018 Hon. mention	Scott Mobley	Progressive in Navy Blue: Maritime Strategy, American Empire, and the Transformation of U.S. Naval Identity, 1873–1898	Naval Institute Press
2018 Hon. mention	William N. Still, Jr.	Victory Without Peace: The United States Navy in European Waters, 1919–1924	Naval Institute Press
2019 Winner	Benjamin Armstrong	Small Boats and Daring Men: Maritime Raiding, Irregular Warfare, and the Early American Navy	University of Oklahoma Press
2019 Hon. mention	Ryan D. Wadle	Selling Sea Power: Public Relations and the U.S. Navy, 1917–1941	University of Oklahoma Press
2020 Winner	Thomas Heinrich	Warship Builders: An Industrial History of U.S. Navy Ship-building, 1922–1945	Naval Institute Press
2020 Hon. mention	John B. Hattendorf & William P. Leeman, eds.	Forging the Trident: Theodore Roosevelt and the United States Navy	Naval Institute Press
2021 Winner	Michael Bonner & Peter McCord	The Union Blockade in the American Civil War, A Reassessment	University of Tennessee Press
2021 Hon. mention	Claude Berube	On Wide Seas: The US Navy in the Jacksonian Era	University of Alabama Press
2021 Hon. mention	Edward J. Marolda	Admirals Under Fire: The US Navy and the Vietnam War	Texas Tech University Press
2022 Winner	Thomas Sheppard	Commanding Petty Despots: The American Navy in the New Republic	Naval Institute Press
2022 Hon. mention	Trent Hone	Mastering the Art of Command: Admiral Chester W. Nimitz and Victory in the Pacific	Naval Institute Press
2022 Hon. mention	Michael A. Verney	A Great and Rising Nation: Naval Exploration and Global Empire in the Early US Republic	University of Chicago Press

World Naval and Maritime History
Year	Author	Book	Publisher
2021 Winner	Nicholas A. Lambert	The War Lords and the Gallipoli Disaster: How Globalized Trade Led Britain to its Worst Defeat of the First World War	Oxford University Press
2021 Hon. mention	Dane A. Morrison	Eastward of Good Hope: Early America in a Dangerous World	Johns Hopkins University Press
2022 Winner	Ryan Tucker Jones	Red Leviathan: The Secret History of Soviet Whaling	University of Chicago Press
2022 Hon. mention	Simcha Jacobovici & Sean Kingsley	Enslaved: The Sunken History of the Transatlantic Slave Trade	Pegasus

== See also ==
- List of history awards
- List of literary awards
- List of prizes named after people
