= Samuel Eliot Morison Award =

Samuel Eliot Morison Award may refer to:

- Samuel Eliot Morison Award (American Heritage), established in 1976 by American Heritage Publishing Company
- Samuel Eliot Morison Award (USS Constitution Museum), established in 1977 by USS Constitution Museum
- Samuel Eliot Morison Award for Naval Literature, established in 1982 by the New York Commandery of the Naval Order of the United States
- Samuel Eliot Morison Prize, established in 1985 by the Society for Military History
