= Results of the War of 1812 =

The results of the War of 1812, which was fought between the United Kingdom and the United States from 1812 to 1814, included no immediate boundary changes. The main result of the War of 1812 has been over two centuries of peace between the two countries.

All of the causes for the war disappeared with the end of the Napoleonic Wars between Britain and France and the destruction of the power of Native Americans opened an "Era of Good Feelings", with reduced partisanship and an exuberant spirit. The British paid little attention to the War of 1812 since they were preoccupied with their final defeat of Napoleon, which occurred in 1815. The Americans failed to gain any territory from British North America, despite many American politicians' hopes and expectations, but still managed to gain land from Spain.

After Napoleon's defeat in 1815, Britain was no longer at war with France, and restrictions on trade ended. The British suspended their policy of impressment of American sailors since there was no need to resume it. Americans believed that they had regained their honor and proclaimed victory in what they called a "Second War of Independence" after the British defeats at New Orleans and it was perceived that Britain was not able to regain control of America. However, that had never been plausible or even intended by the British during any of the war.

The threat of secession by New England ended after the failure of the Hartford Convention. In Britain, the importance of the conflict was totally overshadowed by European triumphs since Napoleon returned from exile in March 1815, but he was finally defeated at the Battle of Waterloo a few months later.

Upper Canada emerged from the war with a sense of unity and pride as part of the British Empire. Anglophone Canadians claimed the war as a victory for their freedom from American control and credited their militia for the repulse of the American invasions. Francophone Canadians largely ignored the war. The Native Americans' westward revolt was weakened.

== Early peace talks ==
Efforts to end the war began in 1812, when the main American diplomat in London proposed an armistice in return for a renunciation of impressments, but the British refused. Later in 1812, when the British captured Fort Detroit and news of the repeal of the Orders-in-Council reached Washington, DC, George Prevost arranged an armistice with his counterpart, Henry Dearborn. The British frigate HMS Junon was sent to relay the Americans' response to the British squadrons on the North American Station. However, US president James Madison decided to continue the war. In 1813, the Russian Empire offered to mediate a peace, but London rejected the offer for fear of compromising British interests in Europe. Finally, Britain and the United States agreed to peace talks in January 1814.

== Negotiations ==
In August 1814, peace discussions finally began in the neutral city of Ghent. Both sides began negotiations with unrealistic demands. The United States wanted an end to all British maritime practices that it deemed to be objectionable and also demanded cessions of Canadian territory and guaranteed fishing rights off Newfoundland. The British announced, as an essential element of the peace treaty, their longstanding goal of creating a "neutral" Indian barrier state, which would cover most of the Old Northwest, be independent of the United States, and be under the tutelage of the British, who could use it to block American expansion and to build up British control of the fur trade. London dropped that demand when the Americans adamantly refused it and indicated that they would end negotiations. The British had been weakened by the collapse of Tecumseh's Confederacy after the Battle of the Thames in 1813 and no longer controlled adequate supply lines to support a barrier state. Britain also wanted to keep the northeastern parts of Maine that had been captured to provide a land corridor to Quebec from the Maritime Colonies.

After months of negotiations, against the background of changing military victories and defeats, both parties finally realized that their nations wanted peace and that there was no real reason to continue the war. Both sides were tired of the war since port trade was almost paralyzed. Also, after Napoleon had fallen in 1814, France was no longer an enemy of Britain and so the Royal Navy no longer needed to stop American shipments to France or to have more seamen. The British were preoccupied in the rebuilding of Europe after the apparently-final defeat of Napoleon. The negotiators agreed to return to the status quo ante bellum, with no changes in boundaries. Both sides signed the Treaty of Ghent on December 24, 1814. The next and final step would be the treaty's formal ratification by both governments.

When the treaty was signed, the British but not the Americans knew about the imminent Battle of New Orleans, which would be fought on January 8, 1815. The treaty finally went into effect after it had been formally ratified by both sides in February 1815.

The treaty failed to secure official British acknowledgement of American maritime rights, but in the century of peace between the world's naval powers from 1815 to World War I, those rights were not seriously violated. The Royal Navy ended its practices that had angered Americans since they were no longer needed since the fall of Napoleon. American pride and honor were built by the Indian threat being ended and by the rejoicing surrounding American victory at New Orleans. In doing so, the United States had successfully created a sense that it had become fully independent from Britain.

== Native Americans ==
A key reason that American frontiersmen had been so much for the war in the first place was the threat posed to their continued settlement of territory that was inhabited by Native Americans of various tribes. The frontiersmen blamed Native Americans' attacks on the arms and supplies that were provided by British agents in Canada. In addition, the frontiersmen wanted access to lands for which the British acknowledged belonged to the United States but blocked its expansion by inciting and arming the Native Americans. The 1813 death of Tecumseh in battle removed a powerful obstacle to American expansion although the Native Americans' involvement in the war continued, as did their resistance to American westward expansion after it ended. The Native Americans were the main losers in the war by their loss of British protection and never regained their influence.

In the Southeastern United States, Andrew Jackson's destruction of Britain's allies, the Creek Indians, at the Battle of Horseshoe Bend in 1814, ended the threat of Native American hostilities in that region. That opened vast areas in Georgia and Alabama for settlement as plantations and farmlands. The United States occupied all of West Florida during the war and, in 1819, purchased the rest of Florida from Spain with the Adams–Onís Treaty, which prevented the Spanish from arming hostile tribes there. Creek Indians who escaped to Spanish Florida joined the Seminoles there and put up a long resistance, known as the Seminole Wars.

In the Treaty of Ghent, the British promised not to arm the Native Americans from Canada or even to trade with them, and the border was largely pacified. However, some Americans assumed that the British had continued to conspire with their former Native American allies in an attempt to forestall American hegemony in the Great Lakes region, but Calloway argued that such perceptions were faulty. After the treaty, the Native Americans in the Great Lakes region became an undesirable burden to British policymakers.

== Canada ==
Some American politicians had mistakenly expected the population of Upper Canada, which was partially of American origin, to throw off its "British yoke". However, that did not happen since many of them were United Empire Loyalists and had, willingly or otherwise, left the US out of loyalty to Britain. After 1815, British officials, Anglican clergy, and Loyalists tried to spot and root out American ideals like democracy and republicanism. Thus, the British and Loyalists would set the different colonies of what would later become Canada on a course that was different from that of their former enemy. They also discouraged further immigration from the United States.

When the United States attacked British North America, most British forces were engaged in the Napoleonic Wars. Thus, British North America had minimal troops to defend against the United States, whose much larger military force was, however, initially poorly trained. For most of the war, British North America stood alone against a much stronger American force. Reinforcements from Britain did not arrive until 1814, during the final year of the war. The repelling of the American force helped to foster Loyalism in the colonies that later became Canada.

The nationalistic sentiment caused suspicion of such American ideas as republicanism, which would frustrate political reform in both Upper and Lower Canada until the Rebellions of 1837. However, the war started the process that ultimately led to Canadian Confederation in 1867. The Canadian writer Pierre Berton wrote that although later events, such as the rebellions and the Fenian raids of the 1860s were more important, Canada would likely have become part of the United States if the war had not taken place since American settlers would have continued to arrive and so Canadian nationalism would not have developed.

The war was highly significant in Britain's North American colonies. After the war, Canadian supporters of Britain portrayed the war as a successful fight for national survival against an American democratic force that threatened the peace and stability that the Canadians had desired. Throughout the war, most of Canada's inhabitants assigned the war to an American desire to annex the British colonies, a perception that was reinforced by American Generals such as William Hull, who issued proclamations that stated that Canada would be annexed.

Some historians have argued that one myth that emerged from the war was that Canadian militiamen played a decisive role during the war and that British officers were often ineffective. Jack Granatstein has termed that the "militia myth" and felt that to have had a deep effect on Canadian military thinking, which placed more stress on a citizens' militia than on a professional standing army. The United States suffered from a similar "frontiersman myth" at the start of the war and falsely believed that individual initiative and marksmanship could be effective against a well-disciplined British battle line. Granatstein argued that the militia was not particularly effective in the war and that any British military success was the work of British regular forces and the result of British domination over the sea. Isaac Brock, for example, was reluctant to trust the militia with muskets.

Others reject that characterization and argue that the Canadian militia played important roles in several key engagements, including the Battle of Chateauguay, in which it was central to the defeat of the American advance on Montreal during the fall of 1813. The historian Robert Henderson referred to that as the "myth of the 'militia myth'".

In any case, more than 1,600 names of the dead, Canadian (both members of regular units and militia) as well as First Nations Crown allies, are in the Book of Remembrance in the Memorial Chamber in the Parliament of Canada. Many of them were members of Canadian militia units.

During the war, British officers constantly worried that the Americans would block the St. Lawrence River, which forms part of the Canada–United States border. If that had occurred, there would have been no British supply route for Upper Canada, where most of the land battles took place, and British forces would likely have had to withdraw from or surrender all of the western British territory within a few months. British officers' dispatches after the war exhibited astonishment that the Americans never took such a simple step, but the British were not willing to count on their enemy repeating the mistake and so they commissioned the Rideau Canal, an expensive project that connects Kingston, on Lake Ontario, to the Ottawa River, to provide an alternative supply route to bypass the part of the St. Lawrence River along the border. The settlement at the northeastern end of the canal, where it joins the Ottawa River, later became the city of Ottawa, Canada's fourth-largest city and its capital, which was placed inland to protect it from an American invasion and was then known as the "defensible back-country". Because the population far from the St. Lawrence shores was negligible, the British, in the years following the war, took great lengths to ensure that back-country settlement was increased. They settled soldiers, initiated assisted-immigration schemes, and offered free land to farmers, mostly tenants of estates in the south of Ireland. The canal project was not completed until 1832 and was never used for its intended purpose.

The United States Army had made several attempts to invade Canada and the Canadians had defended their territory. The British did not doubt that the thinly populated territory would remain vulnerable in another war. In 1817, Admiral David Milne wrote to a correspondent: "We cannot keep Canada if the Americans declare war against us again." The Rideau Canal was later built for just such a scenario.

== United Kingdom ==
Unlike in Canada, the War of 1812 is now seldom remembered in the United Kingdom, and the conflict was quickly forgotten by the British public, chiefly because it was overshadowed by the dramatic events of the contemporary Napoleonic Wars. Additionally, Britain neither gained nor lost anything by the peace settlement; it maintained its control of Canada.

The Royal Navy was acutely conscious that the US Navy had won multiple single-ship duels during the war's opening stages; while these victories had very little strategic significance, they served as major propaganda victories for the Americans and boosted the prestige of the United States Navy. Despite the fact that the British had dominated the ocean, with almost all of the US Navy blockaded to port, by the end of the conflict, the Royal Navy struggled to overcome feelings of humiliation for its early defeats. The Royal Navy's honor was somewhat restored with the capture of the USS President in January 1815; the frigate was taken to Britain so that "all could see" that the American ships that had supposedly been victorious in the battles of equal force were actually much larger than the British ships that they engaged. However, the captured President would not arrive until after the war had fully concluded. Regardless, the British decided to take President into the Royal Navy as the 50-gun (later 60-gun) fourth-rate HMS President. Assigned to the West Indian Squadron, HMS President was intended to taunt the Americans over the ship's capture. However, captured in poor condition, the recommissioned President was described as a "dilapidated ship" despite extensive repairs and had to be broken up in 1818. The Royal Navy proceeded to build a 60-gun frigate to the exact lines of the captured ship, naming it President, despite some elements of the design (such as its countered stern) being obsolete. Intended to make a political statement, HMS President was designated the flagship of the North American station; the British even designated George Cockburn, who led the Burning of Washington, as the ship's commander.

American privateers and commerce raiders captured approximately 1,200 British merchant ships, representing 5% to 7% of all British commerce, increasing insurance rates and embarrassing the Admiralty. Nevertheless, by the war's conclusion about 50% of all American privateers were captured by the British. Meanwhile, for every 14 American merchant ships that traded before the start of the war, only one ship dared to leave port during the war, despite the Americans' effort to double their maritime trade. Furthermore, of the few ships that left port, a total of 1,400 were captured. The Royal Navy was able to deploy overwhelming strength to American waters, which had the effect of virtually extinguishing American maritime trade by the end of the war.

The British Army regarded the conflict in Canada and America as a sideshow. Only one regiment, the 41st, was awarded a battle honor (Detroit) from the war. The British Army was more interested in the lessons of the Peninsular War in Spain. The Battle of New Orleans could be conveniently attributed to either poor leadership or insuperable physical obstacles, deflecting instead to the Royal Navy's capture of the American flagship. Due largely to the success and the pre-eminence of the Duke of Wellington in Europe against Napoleon, the British Army made no changes to its systems of recruitment, discipline, and awards of commissions for more than half a century.

The British suffered 10,000 fatalities in the war, 1,960 of them in combat.

== United States ==
The gloom in New England, which staunchly opposed the war, culminated in December 1814, as delegates from five states met secretly in the Hartford Convention, which demanded constitutional amendments to protect New England's interests against the West and the South. Talk of secession was rife, and the region might have threatened to secede from the Union if its demands had been ignored, but news of peace ended the movement.

The United States had faced a near-disaster in 1814, but victories at the Battle of New Orleans, Battle of Plattsburgh, and the Battle of Baltimore and what seemed to be a successful fight against the British united the Americans into one nation. Meanwhile, the loss of the American frigate President was conveniently overlooked by the public. The best-known patriotic legacy of the war was "The Star-Spangled Banner" Its words are by Francis Scott Key, who, after the bombardment of Fort McHenry, set them to the music of a British drinking song, "To Anacreon in Heaven". In 1889, the US Navy began using "The Star Spangled Banner" at flag-raising ceremonies, a practice that was copied by the US Army. In 1931, the US Congress made it the American national anthem.

Although all of their objectives of the war with regards to the invasion of Canada had failed, the American people saw the War of 1812 as evidence of the success of the democratic experiment. The war ushered in a period in American history that has frequently been called "the Era of Good Feelings". At least on the surface, most Americans felt unified behind a common purpose. The war convinced the country that it could fend off any foreign threats and that its focus should be on expansion at home.

With the collapse of the Hartford Convention and news of the triumph at the Battle of New Orleans, Americans had cause for celebration. In February, President James Madison sent Congress the Treaty of Ghent. He congratulated the nation on the close of a war "waged with the success which is the natural result of the wisdom of the legislative councils, of the patriotism of the people, of the public spirit of the militia, and of the valor of the military and naval forces of the country." The spirit of nationalism and pride led to the collapse of the antiwar Federalist Party and the new Era of Good Feelings.

One indirect result of the War of 1812 was the later election to the presidency of the war heroes Andrew Jackson and later William Henry Harrison. Both men won military fame, which had much to do with their election victories. Another indirect result was the decline of the power of the Federalist Party.

=== American military ===
During the war, roughly 15,000 American soldiers and sailors died, 3,721 in combat. The war cost the United States about $200 million. Neither the United States nor the United Kingdom gained any military advantage, but indirectly, the United States made some gains.

A significant military development was the increased emphasis by General Winfield Scott on professionalism in the Army's officer corps, particularly the training of officers at the US Military Academy ("West Point"). The new professionalism would become apparent during the Mexican–American War (1846–1848). After the annexation of Texas by the United States, the term "Manifest Destiny" became a widely used political term for those who propagated American expansionism and military pride.

In a related development, the United States officially abandoned its reliance on the militia for its defense in favor of a standing army. Moreover, the United States Army Corps of Engineers, which then controlled West Point, began building fortifications around New Orleans as a response to the British attack on the city during the war. That effort then grew into numerous civil river works, especially in the 1830s and the 1850s under General Pierre Beauregard. The Corps remains the authority over works on the Mississippi River and other rivers.

The embarrassing defeat of Fort Madison, in what is now Iowa, and Fort Shelby, in Prairie du Chien, led to the fortification of the Mississippi, with the expansion of Fort Belle Fontaine, near St. Louis, and the construction of Fort Armstrong (1816) and Fort Edwards (1816), in Illinois; Fort Crawford (1816), in Prairie du Chien; and Fort Snelling (1819) in Minnesota. The removal of all Indians from the Mississippi Valley became a top priority for the American government.

== Honor ==
The historian Norman Risjord emphasized the central importance of honor as a cause for the war. Americans of every political stripe saw the need to uphold national honor and to reject the treatment of their country by Britain as a third-class nonentity. Americans talked incessantly about the need for force in response. The quest for honor was a major cause of the war in the sense that most Americans who were not involved in mercantile interests or threatened by Indian attack strongly endorsed the preservation of national honor. The Chesapeake–Leopard affair in which HMS Leopard attacked the US frigate Chesapeake in June 1807 was a decisive event. Historians have documented the importance of American honor in shaping public opinion in a number of states, including Massachusetts, Ohio, Pennsylvania, Tennessee, and the Territory of Michigan. Americans widely celebrated the conclusion of the war as successful, especially after the spectacular defeat of the main British invasion army at New Orleans. For the next century, it was often called "the Second American War for Independence," and it propelled Andrew Jackson and William Henry Harrison to the White House. Americans felt that they had restored their sense of honor. Lance Banning wrote:

National honor, the reputation of republican government, and the continuing supremacy of the Republican party had seemed to be at stake... National honor had [now] been satisfied. Americans celebrated the end of the struggle with a brilliant burst of national pride. They felt that they had fought a second war for independence, and had won.

According to historians such as Andrew Lambert and William James, British honor was challenged because deserters from the Royal Navy were granted American citizenship, which led to the impressment of American citizens into the Royal Navy. In 1811, the Little Belt affair would anger the Admiralty, embarrass the United States, and lead to the British having a particular interest in capturing the American frigate President. Although the British would effectively disable the vast majority of the US Navy during the war by having the ships blockaded, the single-ship actions won by the Americans embarrassed the British Admiralty. Specific attention was given to those battles since the Americans claimed that they were between ships of equal force.

The British effectively restored their honor by capturing the sloop of war Frolic and, more importantly, the flagship President. Both ships were taken to Britain for all to see that the American ships of the so-called engagements of equal force were much larger than the British ships that they had fought in single-ship duels. Furthermore, the United States failed at abolishing impressment when the treaty was signed, but the British did not continue the practice since the Napoleonic Wars had ended; the British no longer needed as many sailors. In doing so, British honor was restored, but the entire conflict was overshadowed by the defeat of Napoleon.

== Economic impact ==
Although the War of 1812 severely damaged the American economy because of the British blockade, the aftermath of the war gave a dramatic boost to American manufacturing capabilities, led to a sharp decrease in goods prices, and the strengthening of the dollar. The British blockade of the American coast had created a shortage of cotton cloth, which led the Americans to create a cotton-manufacturing industry that began at Waltham, Massachusetts, by Francis Cabot Lowell. The war also spurred on the construction of the Erie Canal, and the project was built to promote commercial links and was perceived to have military uses if the need ever arose.

As the charter of the First Bank of the United States had been allowed to expire in 1811, the federal government was ill-prepared to finance the war and so resorted to such expediencies as the suspension of specie payment and the issuance of Treasury Notes. Those actions set a precedent for future federal responses to financial crises. Also, the exposure of the nation's financial weaknesses partly explained the decision for Congress to charter the Second Bank of the United States in 1816. The readiness of southern leaders, especially John C. Calhoun, to support such a measure also indicates a high degree of national feeling. Perhaps the clearest sign of a new sense of national unity was the victorious Democratic-Republican Party, with its longtime foes, the Federalist Party, vanishing from national politics. The result was an Era of Good Feelings, which had the lowest level of partisanship that was ever seen.

Canadians, however, contrasted their postwar economic stagnation to the booming American economy, which Desmond Morton believed to have led to the Rebellions of 1837. During the war, Bermuda privateers, with their fast Bermuda sloops, were to capture 298 ships. The total captures by all British naval or privateering vessels between the Great Lakes and the West Indies was 1,593 vessels.

== See also ==
- Chronology of the War of 1812
- Origins of the War of 1812
- Anglo-American Convention of 1818

== Bibliography ==
- Benn, Carl (2002). The War of 1812. Oxford: Osprey Publishing. ISBN 978-1-84176-466-5.
- Black, Jeremy (2009). The War of 1812 in the Age of Napoleon. Continuum. ISBN 978-0-82-643612-2. by English military historian
- Borneman, Walter R. (2004). 1812: The War That Forged a Nation. HarperCollins. ISBN 978-0-06-053113-3., the popular American version
- Dangerfield, George (1952). The Era of Good Feelings. Harcourt, Brace and Company.
- Dangerfield, George (1966). The Awakening of American Nationalism, 1815–1828.
- Engerman, Stanley; Gallman, Robert E., eds. (2000). The Cambridge economic history of the United States: the colonial era: Volume 1. Cambridge University Press. ISBN 978-0-52-139442-0.
- Granatstein, J. L. (2004). Canada's army: waging war and keeping the peace (1st ed.). University of Toronto Press. ISBN 978-0-80-208696-9.
- Hayward, Walter Brownell (1910). Bermuda past and present.
- Morton, Desmond (2007). A Military History of Canada. McClelland & Stewart. ISBN 978-0-77-106514-9.
- Pratt, Julius W. (1955). A history of United States foreign-policy. Prentice-Hall. ISBN 9780133922820.
- Remini, Robert V. (1991). Henry Clay: Statesmen for the Union. W. W. Norton. ISBN 978-0393030044.
- Remini, Robert V. (2001). Andrew Jackson and His Indian Wars. Viking. ISBN 978-0-78-618568-9.
- Taylor, Alan (2010). The Civil War of 1812: American Citizens, British Subjects, Irish Rebels, & Indian Allies. Alfred A. Knopf. ISBN 978-0-67-977673-4. Pulitzer Prize winner
- Toll, Ian W. (2006). Six Frigates: The Epic History of the Founding of the U.S. Navy. New York: W. W. Norton. ISBN 978-0-393-05847-5.
