= Craig L. Symonds =

American historian (1946–2026)

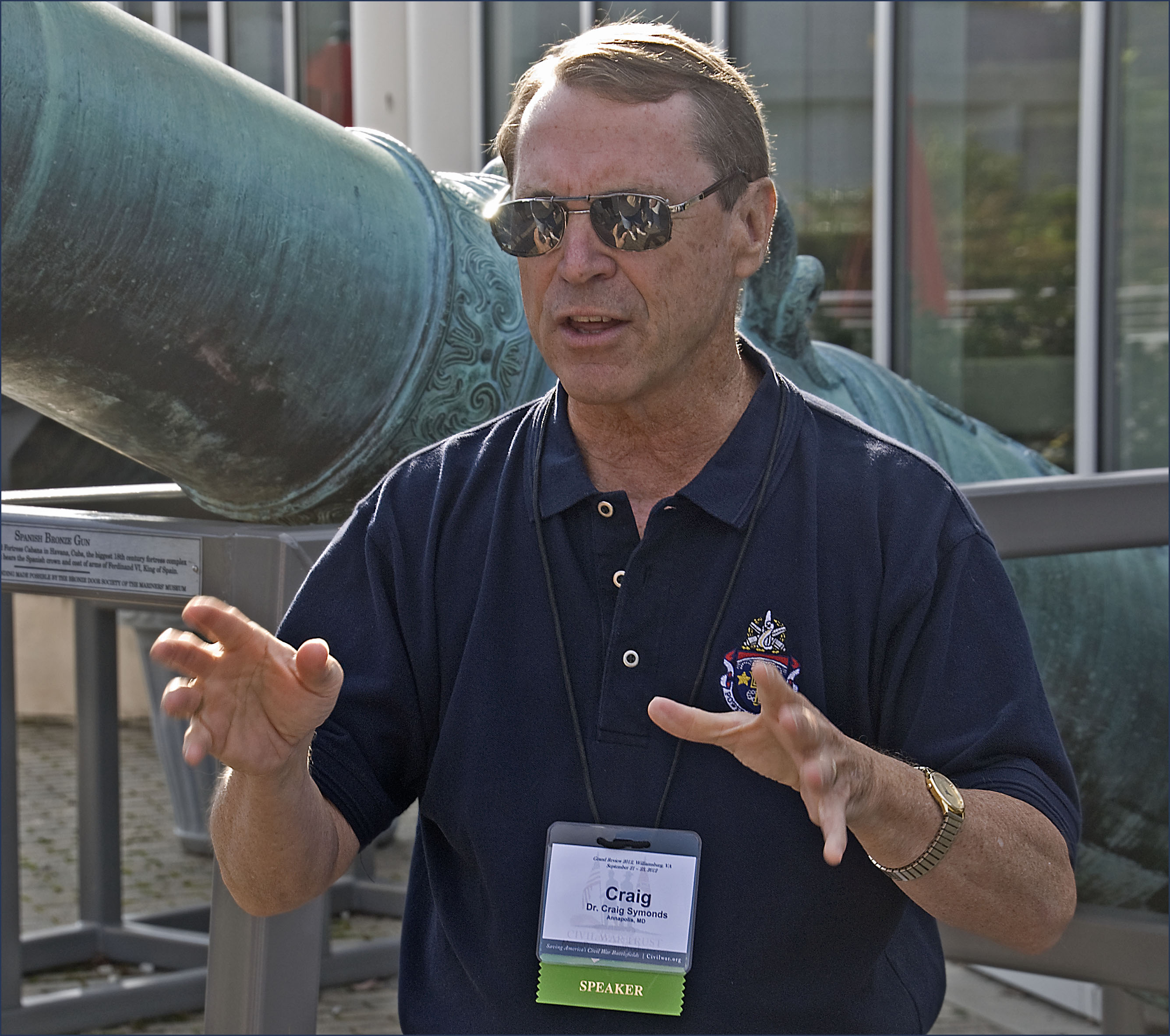
- Symonds in 2012
- Born: 31 December 1946; Long Beach, California, U.S.
- Died: 13 October 2026 (aged 79); Annapolis, Maryland, U.S.
- Works: Lincoln and His Admirals; Neptune: The Allied Invasion of Europe and the D-Day Landings
- Awards: Lincoln Prize for Lincoln and His Admirals; 2015 recipient of the Samuel Eliot Morison Award for Naval Literature

Craig Lee Symonds (31 December 1946 – 13 October 2026) was an American naval historian, who was the Distinguished Visiting Ernest J. King Professor of Maritime History from 2017 to 2020 at the Naval War College in Newport, Rhode Island. He was also professor emeritus at the United States Naval Academy, where he served as chairman of the history department. Symonds was a distinguished historian of the American Civil War, World War II, and maritime history. His book Lincoln and His Admirals won the Lincoln Prize. His book Neptune: The Allied Invasion of Europe and the D-Day Landings was the 2015 recipient of the Samuel Eliot Morison Award for Naval Literature, and his book Nimitz at War: Command Leadership from Pearl Harbor to Tokyo Bay won the Gilder-Lehrman Military History prize. In 2023, he was awarded the Pritzker Military Museum & Library Literature Award for Lifetime Achievement in Military Writing.

== Early life and education ==
Symonds was born in Long Beach, California, on 31 December 1946 to Lee and Virginia (née Garrison) Symonds, and grew up in Anaheim, California. He attended Anaheim High School and then the University of California, Los Angeles (UCLA), where he earned his Bachelor of Arts degree in 1967. Going on to graduate work, he obtained his M.A. in history at the University of Florida in 1969 with the thesis The Defense of the Southwestern Frontier, 1784–1794: A Study in Governmental Relations (OCLC 13483909). He married Marylou Hayden in 1969 and the couple had one son. In 1971, Symonds joined the United States Naval Reserve, serving for three years until 1974 and rising to the grade of lieutenant. While in the Navy, he served on the staff and faculty of the Naval War College. On his release from active duty, he returned to his graduate studies in history at the University of Florida, where he obtained his Ph.D. in 1976 under the tutelage of Professor John K. Mahon with the dissertation Navalists and Antinavalists: The Naval Policy Debate in the United States, 1785–1827 (OCLC 03232014).

== Academic career ==
In 1976, the United States Naval Academy in Annapolis, Maryland, appointed Symonds assistant professor of history to succeed Professor E. B. Potter as a specialist in naval history. He was subsequently promoted to associate professor in 1980 and professor of history in 1985. He served as chairman of the history department in 1988–1992 and was appointed professor emeritus on his retirement in 2005. In 1994–1995, he was visiting lecturer at Britannia Royal Naval College in Dartmouth, England. He returned to teach at the Naval Academy as The Class of 1957 Distinguished Professor of American Naval Heritage for 2011–12. He was later the Ernest J. King Distinguished Visiting Professor of Maritime History at the U.S. Naval War College in Newport, Rhode Island.

== Death ==
Symonds died from cancer at his home in Annapolis, Maryland, on 13 October 2026, at the age of 79.

== Awards ==
- Gilder Lehrman Military History Prize, 2024
- Pritzker Military Museum & Library Literature Award for Lifetime Achievement in Military Writing in 2023
- Samuel Eliot Morison Award for Naval Literature in 2015 for Neptune: The Allied Invasion of Europe and the D-Day Landings
- Commodore Dudley W. Knox Naval History Lifetime Achievement Award, Naval Historical Foundation
- The Abraham Lincoln Institute Book Award, 2010
- The Lincoln Prize, 2009 (co-winner with James M. McPherson) for Lincoln and His Admirals
- The Benjamin Barondess Award of the Civil War Roundtable of New York, 2009
- The Daniel and Marilyn Laney Prize, 2009
- The Nevins-Freeman Prize, 2009
- Annie Award, literary arts category, Arts Council of Anne Arundel County, 2006
- The Theodore and Franklin D. Roosevelt Prize in Naval History, 2005
- John Lyman Book Awards, 1995, 1999, 2008
- USNA Research Excellence Award, 1998
- USNA Teaching Excellence Award, 1988
- Navy Superior Civilian Service Award, 1994, 1998, 2005, 2020
- Navy Meritorious Civilian Service Award, 1989

== Published works ==
- Charleston Blockade: The Journals of John B. Marchand, USN, edited by Craig Symonds. (Newport, RI: Naval War College Press, 1976.
- Navalists and Antinavalists: The Naval Policy Debate in the United States, 1785–1827. (University of Delaware Press, 1980).
- New Aspects of Naval History, edited by Craig Symonds. (Annapolis, MD: Naval Institute Press, 1981).
- A Battlefield Atlas of the Civil War. (Annapolis, MD: Nautical and Aviation Press, 1983). ISBN 978-0933852495
- William H. Parker (1985). Craig Symonds (ed.). Recollections of a Naval Officer, 1841–1865. Annapolis, MD: Naval Institute Press. ISBN 978-0-87021-533-9.
- A Battlefield Atlas of the American Revolution. (Annapolis, MD: Nautical and Aviation Press, 1986).
- Alvah F. Hunter (1987). Craig Symonds (ed.). A Year on a Monitor. Columbia, SC: University of South Carolina Press. ISBN 978-0-87249-761-0. (reprint 1991)
- Joseph E. Johnston: A Civil War Biography. New York: Norton. 1992. ISBN 978-0-393-31130-3.
- Gettysburg: A Battlefield Atlas, by Craig Symonds with William J. Clipson. (Annapolis, MD: Nautical and Aviation, 1992).
- The Naval Institute Historical Atlas of the U.S. Navy. Illustrator William J. Clipson. Annapolis, MD: Naval Institute Press. 1995. ISBN 978-1-55750-984-0.
- Stonewall of the West: Patrick Cleburne and the Civil War. (Lawrence, KS: University Press of Kansas, 1997).
- Confederate Admiral: The Life and Wars of Franklin Buchanan. (Annapolis, MD: Naval Institute Press, 1999). ISBN 978-1591148463
- American Heritage History of the Battle of Gettysburg. New York: HarperCollins. 2001. ISBN 978-0-06-054933-6.
- New Interpretations in Naval History: Selected Papers from the Fourteenth Naval History Symposium, Held at Annapolis, Maryland, 23–25 September 1999, Naval Institute Press (Annapolis, MD), 2001.
- Decision at Sea: Five Naval Battles That Shaped American History. New York: Oxford University Press. 2005. ISBN 978-0-19-531211-9.
- Lincoln and his Admirals. New York: Oxford University Press. 2008. ISBN 978-0-19-531022-1.
- The Battle of Midway. New York: Oxford University Press. 2011. ISBN 978-0-19-539793-2.
- The Civil War at Sea. New York: Oxford University Press. 2012. ISBN 978-0199931682.
- Neptune: The Allied Invasion of Europe and the D-Day Landings. Oxford University Press. 2014. ISBN 978-0199986118.
- World War Two at Sea: A Global History. Oxford University Press. 2018. ISBN 978-0190243678.
- Nimitz at War: Command Leadership from Pearl Harbor to Tokyo Bay. Oxford University Press. 2022. ISBN 978-0190062361.
- Annapolis Goes to War: The Naval Academy Class of 1940 and its Trial by Fire in World War II. Oxford University Press. 2025. ISBN 978-0197752678.
