= James M. Scott (historian) =

American historian

James M. Scott is an American military historian. His 2016 book Target Tokyo: Jimmy Doolittle and the Raid that Avenged Pearl Harbor was a finalist for the Pulitzer Prize for History. Reviewers in the Los Angeles Times and the Wall Street Journal described the book as the most comprehensive account of the 1942 Doolittle Raid on Tokyo.

Target Tokyo documents the prelude, planning, execution and aftermath of the 1942 Doolittle Raid on Tokyo. With the United States still in shock after the 1941 Attack on Pearl Harbor, Franklin Roosevelt, looking for a swift response and also a boost to American morale, ordered the attack. Planned by Jimmy Doolittle (who took part in the raid himself), the audacious strike called for land based B-25 bombers to take off from the USS Hornet aircraft carrier to strike industrial targets in Tokyo and other Japanese cities. The airmen would then head west to China and attempt to land in allied airfields or ditch their planes over friendly territory. Three airmen died bailing out of their aircraft, and 8 were captured in China. The captured airmen endured torture by the Japanese as prisoners of war. Of the 8 airmen captured, 3 were executed by the Japanese, one died of starvation in prison and four were freed in 1945. The Japanese launched a military campaign in China to punish the Chinese, who they believed had aided the raiders, resulting in the death of about 250,000 people. The raid, despite inflicting light damage, was viewed as a smashing success in the United States. The Japanese had highlighted the civilian casualties from the raid and falsely claimed to have shot down some of the bombers in an attempt to rally their population. Scott argues that the raid had alarmed Japanese military planners, as they believed Japanese cities were easily within reach of American bombers. Scott states that this concern led the Japanese Navy to engage the Americans at the Battle of Midway in 1942, in an attempt to create a buffer zone around the home islands, with the subsequent American victory serving as a turning point in the war.

Scotts 2009 book, The Attack on the Liberty: The Untold Story of Israel's Deadly 1967 Assault on a U.S. Spy Ship details the 1967 USS Liberty Incident in which, during the Six Day War, Israeli aircraft and torpedo boats attacked the US spy ship USS Liberty as it was sailing in international waters north of the Sinai Peninsula . The attack resulted in the deaths of 34 sailors with 171 being wounded. The book was awarded the Samuel Eliot Morison Award for Naval Literature by the Naval Order of the United States. Scott's work directly challenges the prevailing historical narrative that Israel believed the Liberty was an enemy Egyptian ship. Scott argued that some in the Israeli command knew that the ship was American, and that the attack may have been intentional. Scott's own father John was an engineer on the Liberty, who was awarded a Silver Star for his efforts to keep the ship afloat during the attack.

Scott is currently a scholar in residence at The Citadel military college in Charleston, South Carolina. He was previously a Nieman Fellow for journalism at Harvard University. Scott was a writer and investigative reporter for the Post and Courier in Charleston, South Carolina. He has an MA in history from The Citadel military college, and is currently studying for a PhD in war studies at King's College London.
