= Borneman =

Borneman is a surname. Notable people with the surname include:

- Ernest Borneman (1915–1995), crime writer, filmmaker, anthropologist, ethnomusicologist, psychoanalyst, sexologist, communist agitator, jazz musician and critic
- Johnny Borneman III (born 1977), American stock car racing driver
- Walter R. Borneman (born 1952), American historian and lawyer
