= To Fix a National Character =

2024 nonfiction book by Abigail Mullen

To Fix a National Character: The United States in the First Barbary War, 1800–1805
- Author: Abigail Mullen
- Language: English
- Publisher: Johns Hopkins University Press
- Publication date: August 6, 2024
- Pages: 256
- ISBN: 978-1-4214-4926-5

To Fix a National Character: The United States in the First Barbary War, 1800–1805 is a 2024 book by Abigail Mullen. It was reviewed in The American Historical Review, The Journal of European Economic History, the International Journal of Maritime History, and the Journal of the Early Republic. The book co-won a 2024 Lyman Award, presented by the North American Society for Oceanic History, for North American Naval History along with Randy Carol Goguen's From Yeomanettes to Fighter Jets: A Century of Women in the U.S. Navy.
