= The Attack on the Liberty: The Untold Story of Israel's Deadly 1967 Assault on a U.S. Spy Ship =

2009 US naval history book by James Scott

- Author: James Scott
- Language: English
- Publisher: Simon and Schuster
- Publication date: 2009
- Publication place: United States
- ISBN: 9781439166055

The Attack on the Liberty: The Untold Story of Israel's Deadly 1967 Assault on a U.S. Spy Ship is a 2009 book about the USS Liberty incident, a deadly Israeli attack on the American intelligence gathering ship USS Liberty during the Six-Day War in June 1967 written by the investigative journalist James Scott, the son of one of the junior officers on board the US ship at the time.

The book examines the attack, which left 34 US personnel dead, 171 injured and "shocked the world and stunned the American public", carried out as it was by a long-time ally in international waters. It also turns an eye to the geopolitical undercurrents in the aftermath of the incident, which Israel claimed was the result of an inadvertent mistake made in the fog of war and 'hurriedly' apologized for – an apology the U.S. government publicly accepted, while privately US officials and the American public were left incensed by the incident.

In the work, Scott recounts and expands upon the existing detail of the fateful day, providing a "much more complete account" than previously available. He also details the "behind-the-scenes wrangling" within the US government in the weeks that followed over Israel's level of responsibility for the incident. According to the naval historian Jeffrey G. Barlow, Scott succeeded on both accounts.

The book won the 2010 Samuel Eliot Morison Award for Naval Literature, an accolade awarded annually by the New York Commandery of the Naval Order of the United States.

== See also ==
- Attacks on the United States
- Israel–United States relations
- List of friendly fire incidents
