= Robert Randolph Carter =

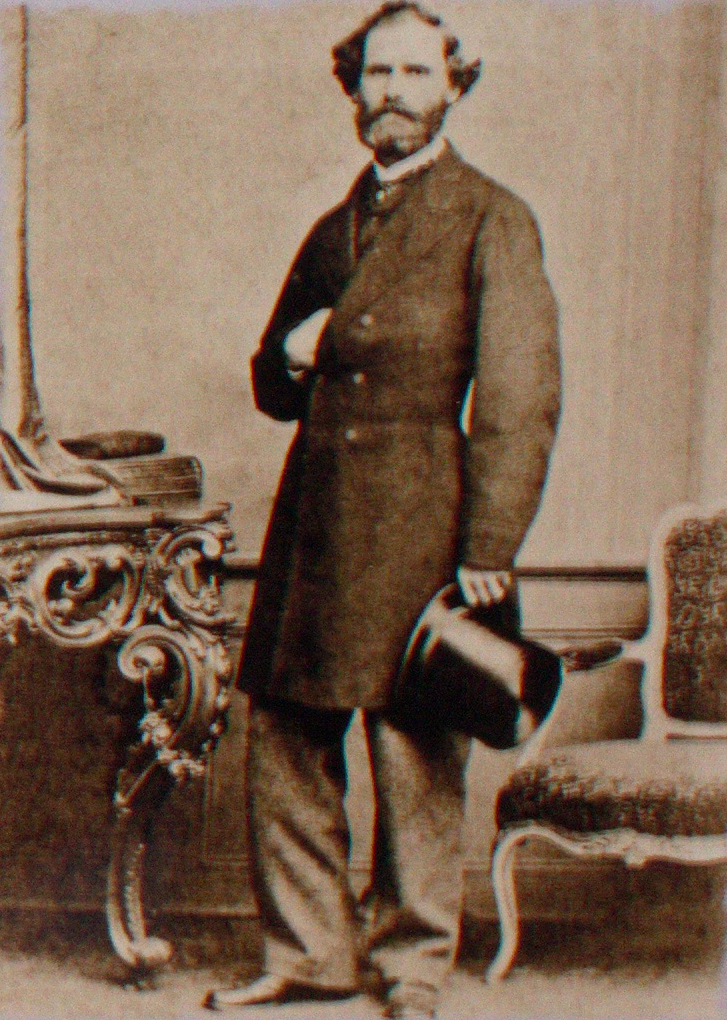
- Photographic portrait of Robert Randolph Carter
- Born: September 15, 1825; Shirley Plantation
- Died: March 8, 1888 (aged 62); Shirley Plantation
- Occupation: Naval officer
- Spouse: Louise Humphreys
- Children: 2

Robert Randolph Carter (September 15, 1825 – March 8, 1888) was an American naval officer who would later come to be known for a journal he kept while unsuccessfully searching for the Franklin expedition. This journal was later posthumously published by the Naval Institute Press as Searching for the Franklin Expedition: The Arctic Journal of Robert Randolph Carter in May 1998 and won the 1998 John Lyman Book Award for Primary Source Materials, Reference Works, and Guide Books. He was a member of the Carter family of Virginia, which was descended from Robert "King" Carter. Carter married Louise Humphreys on January 6, 1852, and had two children with her.

== Biography ==
Carter was born on September 15, 1825, at Shirley Plantation to Hill Carter and Mary Braxton Randolph Carter. Carter would later assume control of Shirley Plantation in 1866, after the death of his father. He attended school in Alexandria, Virginia, and in 1842 joined the United States Navy, during which time he took part in the Mexican–American War. Carter went on to attend the United States Naval Academy, where he graduated in 1849 as a passed midshipman. He took part in several scientific exploration and surveying expeditions and in May 1850 he also took part in an attempt to locate Sir John Franklin's missing expedition to locate the Northwest Passage. During this time Carter kept a journal in which he kept a daily, detailed account of the rescue attempt. He went on to serve as the junior lieutenant and navigator on the Vincennes and in 1858, served on the steamer Argentina.

Carter resigned from the Navy on April 2, 1861, and months later joined the Confederate States Navy. During his time with the Confederate States Navy he was promoted to first lieutenant and was one of many Southern soldiers that received a presidential pardon for serving with the Confederate armed forces. Carter died on March 8, 1888, as a result of injuries sustained from a fall from a granary loft and was buried at Shirley Plantation. Shirley Plantation was inherited by his daughter Marion and her husband James Harrison Oliver.

== Bibliography ==
- The Carter Tree (1951)
- Searching for the Franklin Expedition: The Arctic Journal of Robert Randolph Carter (1998)
