= Black Flags, Blue Waters =

2018 nonfiction book

Black Flags, Blue Waters: The Epic History of America's Most Notorious Pirates
- First edition
- Author: Eric Jay Dolin
- Language: English
- Genre: Non-fiction
- Publisher: Liveright
- Publication date: 2018

Black Flags, Blue Waters: The Epic History of America's Most Notorious Pirates is a 2018 book by Eric Jay Dolin focusing on the Golden Age of Piracy in the Americas. Figures recounted in the book include Blackbeard, William Kidd, Edward Low, John Winthrop, Cotton Mather, Benjamin Franklin, and others.
