= Pensacola: Wings of Gold =

- Genre: Action/Adventure; Drama
- Created by: William Blinn
- Starring: James Brolin
- Composers: John R. Graham; Jimmy Haun
- Country of origin: United States
- Original language: English
- No. of seasons: 3
- No. of episodes: 66

Production
- Executive producers: David H. Balkan; William Blinn; James Brolin; Stu Segall; Jeff Wachtel; Jacqueline Zambrano
- Producers: Laurence Frank; Nan Hagan; Perry Husman; Jeff Wald
- Cinematography: Anthony Anderson; Tom Jewett; Terry Pfrang
- Camera setup: Single-camera
- Running time: 48 minutes
- Production companies: Partner Stations Network; Dauphine Productions; Magdalene Productions; Stu Segall Productions; Eyemark Entertainment (1997–2000) (seasons 1–3); King World (2000) (season 3)

Original release
- Network: Syndication
- Release: September 13, 1997 – May 20, 2000

Pensacola: Wings of Gold is a syndicated American action/adventure drama series based at the Naval Air Station Pensacola in Pensacola, Florida. Episodes were aired in several countries outside the United States including Brazil, Portugal, France, Sweden, South Africa, Finland, Estonia, The Netherlands, Germany, Italy (where it was broadcast on Italia 1 in the 2000s), Hungary, Bulgaria, Romania, Australia, the Asia and Sri Lanka. Although set in Florida, it was largely filmed in San Diego particularly at Marine Corps Air Station Miramar (MCAS Miramar). Cast members in season 2 were part of a squadron mimicking VMFAT-101, the F/A-18 instructor squadron based in Miramar. Outdoor scenes were filmed in San Diego and MCAS Miramar while indoor scenes were filmed at Stu Segall Studios in San Diego.

== Cast ==
- James Brolin as Lt. Col. Bill "Raider" Kelly, commanding officer of VMFAT-107, an F/A-18 Hornet training squadron

=== Season 1 ===
- Kristanna Loken as Janine Kelly, Lt. Col. Kelly's daughter
- Kathryn Morris as Lieutenant Annalisa "Stinger" Lindstrom, UH-1 helicopter aviator
- Rodney Rowland as Lieutenant Bobby "Chaser" Griffin, F/A-18 Hornet aviator
- Rodney Van Johnson as Lieutenant Wendell "Cipher" McCray, Force Recon
- Salvator Xuereb as Lieutenant A.J. "Buddha" Conaway, demolitions expert
- Brynn Thayer as Colonel Rebecca Hodges, LtCol. Kelly's superior officer

=== Season 2 ===
- Bobby Hosea as Maj. MacArthur "Hammer" Lewis, Jr., executive officer (XO) of VMFAT-107; F/A-18 Hornet instructor pilot
- Michael Trucco as Lt. Tucker "Spoon" Henry III, F/A-18 Hornet student aviator
- Sandra Hess as Lt. Alexandra "Ice" Jensen, F/A-18 Hornet student aviator
- Kenny Johnson as Lieutenant Butch "Burner" Barnes, F/A-18 Hornet student aviator
- Barbara Niven as Kate Anderson, barkeep

=== Season 3 ===
- All main cast reprised their role from season 2
- Felicity Waterman as Captain Abigail "Mad Dog" Holley, a helicopter pilot on loan from the Royal Air Force and squadron's boxing coach
- David Quane as Captain Edward "Capone" Terrelli, pilot of the AH-1W "Cobra" gunship, a former fighter pilot

== Episodes ==
=== Season 1 (1997–98) ===
No. overall	No. in season	Title	Directed by	Written by	Original release date
1	1	"Yesterday, Upon the Stair: Part 1"	James Whitmore Jr.	William Blinn	September 13, 1997
2	2	"Yesterday, Upon the Stair: Part 2"	Ray Austin	William Blinn & Morgan Gendel	September 20, 1997
3	3	"Freebird"	Anthony Hickox	Morgan Gendel	September 27, 1997
4	4	"It's the Real Thing, Baby"	Jim Johnston	Nan Hagan	October 4, 1997
5	5	"Fallout"	Terrence O'Hara	Jodie Lewis	October 11, 1997
6	6	"Birds of Prey"	Jack Sholder	Eric Estrin	October 18, 1997
7	7	"Road Warriors"	James A. Contner	Christopher Beaumont	October 25, 1997
8	8	"Grey Ghost"	Peter Ellis	Susan Hamilton-Brin	November 1, 1997
9	9	"Past Sins"	Charles Siebert	Jim Macak	November 8, 1997
10	10	"Bogey Man"	Richard Compton	Morgan Gendel	November 15, 1997
11	11	"Acceptable Casualties"	Peter Ellis	Patricia Rust & William Blinn	November 22, 1997
12	12	"Company Town"	Ron Garcia	Joe Gannon	January 3, 1998
13	13	"Trials and Tribulations"	James Brolin	Nan Hagan	January 10, 1998
14	14	"Soldiers of Misfortune"	Peter Ellis	Babs Greyhosky	January 17, 1998
15	15	"Power Play"	Sidney J. Furie	Jodie Lewis	January 24, 1998
16	16	"Game, Set and Match"	Vincent McEveety	Jim Macak	January 31, 1998
17	17	"Lost Shipment"	James Brolin	Gary Skeen Hall	April 18, 1998
18	18	"We Are Not Alone"	Ron Garcia	Nan Hagan	April 25, 1998
19	19	"Stranger, Lover, Friend"	Peter Ellis	William Blinn & Patricia Rust	May 2, 1998
20	20	"Great Expectations"	Peter Ellis	Jeff Wachtel	May 9, 1998
21	21	"Broken Wings"	Sidney J. Furie	Jim Macak	May 16, 1998
22	22	"Not in My Backyard"	Sidney J. Furie	Morgan Gendel	May 23, 1998

=== Season 2 (1998–1999) ===
No. overall	No. in season	Title	Directed by	Written by	Original release date
23	1	"Nuggets"	Vern Gillum	Jacqueline Zambrano	September 7, 1998
24	2	"Burn Out"	Peter Ellis	Raymond Hartung	September 14, 1998
25	3	"Solo Flight"	Charles Siebert	Laurence Frank	September 21, 1998
26	4	"S.O.D."	Sidney J. Furie	Jim Macak	September 28, 1998
27	5	"Stand Down"	Bill Corcoran	Kris Dobkin	October 5, 1998
28	6	"Raid on Osirak"	Peter Ellis	Chip Proser	October 12, 1998
29	7	"Boom"	Jeff Woolnough	Robert Gandt	October 19, 1998
30	8	"The Red Baron"	James Brolin	Raymond Hartung	October 26, 1998
31	9	"Vertigo"	Tom DeSimone	Jim Macak	November 2, 1998
32	10	"Wild, Wild West"	Charles Siebert	Laurence Frank	November 9, 1998
33	11	"Class Strike"	Charles Siebert	Chip Proser	November 16, 1998
34	12	"Blue Angel"	James Brolin	Robert Gandt	January 30, 1999
35	13	"Lost"	Michael Levine	William T. Conway	February 7, 1999
36	14	"Mishap"	James Brolin	Raymond Hartung & Jacqueline Zambrano	February 14, 1999
37	15	"Fox Two"	Peter Ellis	Jim Macak	February 21, 1999
38	16	"Blue on Blue"	Bruce Bilson	Laurence Frank	February 28, 1999
39	17	"Cuba Libre"	Stewart Raffill	Story by : Chip Proser; Teleplay by : Jim Macak	April 15, 1999
40	18	"Sortie"	Thomas Jewett	Tim Davis & Elinor Jewett	April 22, 1999
41	19	"Touch and Go"	Sidney J. Furie	Raymond Hartung	April 29, 1999
42	20	"G.Q."	Bill Corcoran	Jim Macak	May 6, 1999
43	21	"Night Traps"	Bill Corcoran	Raymond Hartung & Jacqueline Zambrano	May 13, 1999
44	22	"Rules of Engagement"	James Brolin	Story by : Jerry Broeckert; Teleplay by : Robert Gandt	May 20, 1999

=== Season 3 (1999–2000) ===
No. overall	No. in season	Title	Directed by	Written by	Original release date
45	1	"Tip of the Spear"	Peter Ellis	David H. Balkan	September 11, 1999
46	2	"Gypsy Tumble"	Corey Eubanks	Richard Maxwell	September 18, 1999
47	3	"A Wing and a Prayer"	Stewart Raffill	Elliot Stern	September 25, 1999
48	4	"Call to Glory"	James Brolin	Darrell Fetty	October 2, 1999
49	5	"Officers and Gentlemen"	Sidney J. Furie	Burt Prelutsky	October 9, 1999
50	6	"Tattoo"	Charles Siebert	Barry M. Schkolnick	October 16, 1999
51	7	"Burke's Breech"	Peter Ellis	Janna King Kalichman	October 23, 1999
52	8	"Behind Enemy Lines"	Gus Trikonis	David L. Newman	October 30, 1999
53	9	"True Stories"	Stewart Raffill	Elliot Stern	November 6, 1999
54	10	"Don't Ask, Don't Tell"	James Brolin	Darrell Fetty	November 13, 1999
55	11	"On the Tee"	Carl Weathers	Jerry Broeckert	November 20, 1999
56	12	"Aces"	George Mendeluk	Richard Maxwell	November 27, 1999
57	13	"Article 32"	Gus Trikonis	Elliot Stern & Darrell Fetty	January 29, 2000
58	14	"At Poverty Level"	Scott Lautanen	Burt Prelutsky	February 5, 2000
59	15	"Busted"	Stewart Raffill	Gallatin Warfield	February 12, 2000
60	16	"Crash Test"	James Brolin	Harold Apter	February 19, 2000
61	17	"Pensacola Shootout"	Carl Weathers	Gallatin Warfield	February 26, 2000
62	18	"Answered Prayers"	Sidney J. Furie	Harold Apter	April 22, 2000
63	19	"Return to Glory"	Michael Trucco	Darrell Fetty	April 29, 2000
64	20	"Casualties of War"	Sidney J. Furie	Elliot Stern	May 6, 2000
65	21	"Brothers"	Thomas Jewett	Richard Maxwell	May 13, 2000
66	22	"SOCEX: Final Exams"	James Brolin	David H. Balkan	May 20, 2000

== DVD releases ==
FilmRise has released all 3 seasons on DVD.

DVD name	Ep #	Release date
The Complete First Season	22	October 10, 2016
The Complete Second Season	22	February 10, 2017
The Complete Third Season	22	February 10, 2017

== Awards and nominations ==
Year	Awards	Category	Result
1999	Golden Reel Awards	Best Sound Editing	Nominated

== Video games ==
In June/July 1997, Bethesda Softworks announced a partnership with CBS Enterprises to produce the first-ever true companion PC series of games for the series. By December 1997, the first CD-ROM game was still in production.
