= John F. Wukovits =

American military historian

John F. Wukovits is a military historian, who specializes in the Pacific theater during World War II.

== Education ==
He graduated from the University of Notre Dame, where he studied with Bernard Norling.

== Career ==
Wukovits has also written articles for WWII History, Naval History, and World War II.

Tin Can Titans received the 2018 RADM Samuel Eliot Morison Award for Naval Literature.

== His works ==
- Pacific Alamo: The Battle for Wake Island New York, N.Y.: New American Library, 2003. ISBN 0451208730 OCLC 51728802
- Eisenhower: A Biography New York: Palgrave Macmillan, 2006. ISBN 9781403971371 OCLC 65521576
- One Square Mile of Hell: The Battle for Tarawa New York: NAL Caliber, 2006. ISBN 0451218477 OCLC 63125812
- American Commando: Evans Carlson, His WWII Marine Raiders, and America’s First Special Forces Mission New York: NAL Caliber, 2009. ISBN 9780451226921 OCLC 268795493
- Black Sheep: The Life of Pappy Boyington. Annapolis, Maryland: U.S. Naval Institute, 2013. ISBN 9781591149804 OCLC 854618214
- For Crew and Country: The Inspirational True Story of Bravery and Sacrifice Aboard the USS Samuel B. Roberts. New York: St. Martin's Press, 2013. ISBN 9780312681890 OCLC 795172343
- Hell from the Heavens: The Epic Story of the USS Laffey and World War II's Greatest Kamikaze Attack. Cambridge, MA: Da Capo Press, a member of the Perseus Books Group, 2015.
- Tin Can Titans: The Heroic Men and Ships of World War II's Most Decorated Navy Destroyer Squadron. 2017. ISBN 9780306824302 OCLC 952369729
