= Neptune: The Allied Invasion of Europe and the D-Day Landings =

2014 book by Craig Symonds

- Author: Craig L. Symonds
- Subject: Normandy landings during World War II
- Genre: History
- Publisher: Oxford University Press
- Publication date: 2014
- Awards: 2015 Samuel Eliot Morison Award for Naval Literature
- ISBN: 9780199986118
- OCLC: 861207381

Neptune: The Allied Invasion of Europe and the D-Day Landings is a book by Craig L. Symonds published by Oxford University Press in 2014.

== Awards ==
It received the 2015 Samuel Eliot Morison Award for Naval Literature.
