= Robert Gandt =

American author and aviator (born 1939)

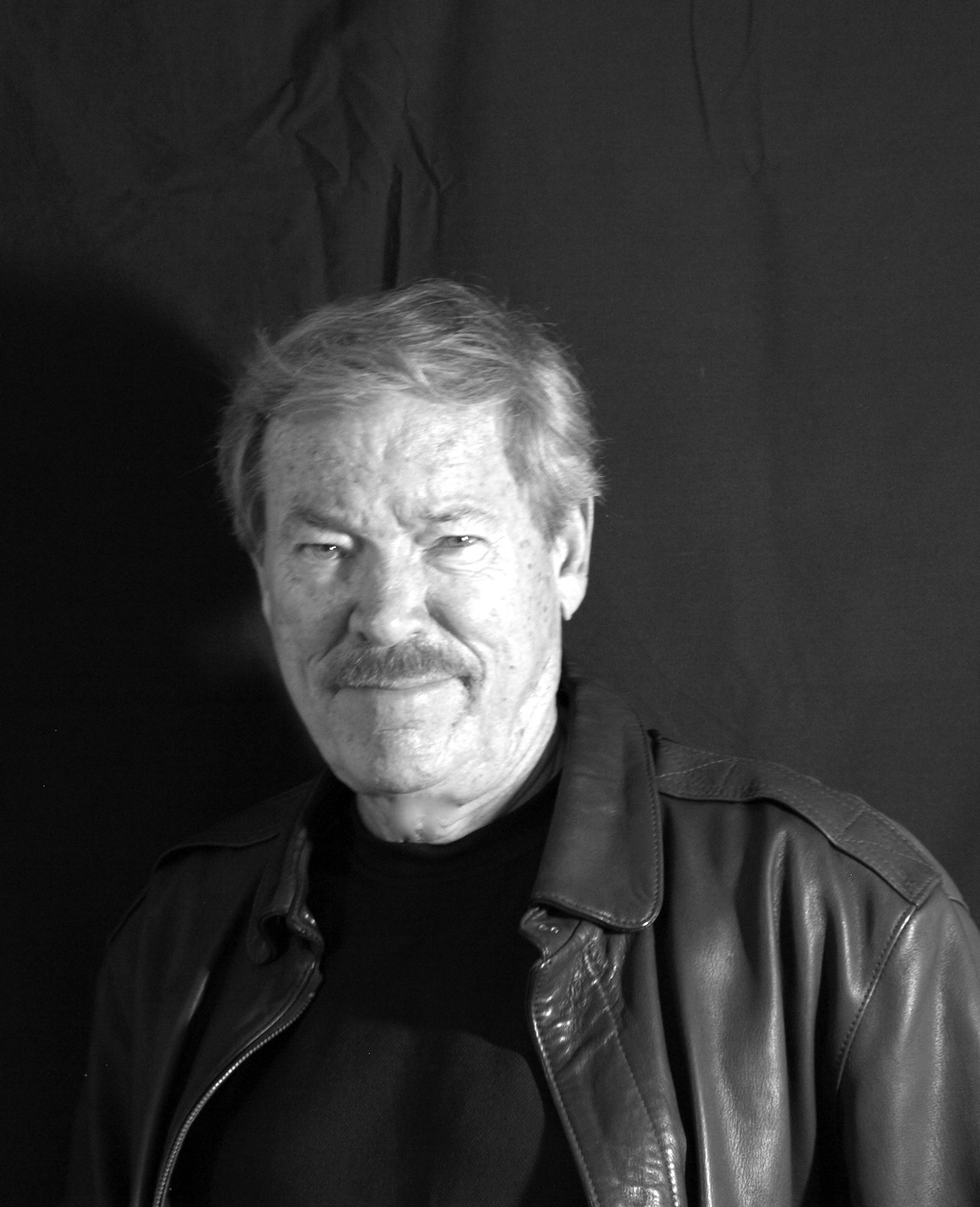
- Born: December 15, 1939 (age 86); Springfield, Missouri
- Education: Charter Oak State College
- Military career
- Allegiance: United States
- Branch: United States Navy

Robert Gandt (born December 15, 1939) is an American author and aviator.

Gandt has written and published more than a dozen books on military and aviation history and military adventure fiction.

== Biography ==
Gandt was born in Springfield, Missouri, and raised in nearby Coffeyville, Kansas. At age twenty he was the youngest aviator and officer then on active duty in the U. S. Navy. After accumulating over 300 carrier landings and nearly 2000 hours in the A-4 Skyhawk, he joined Pan American World Airways as an airline pilot in 1965. With the sale of Pan Am's Atlantic routes in 1991, he transferred to Delta Air Lines as a captain and check airman. In 1985, Gandt was a founder and team member of the Redhawk Formation Aerobatic Team, flying SIAI-Marchetti SF.260 military trainers in precision formation aerobatic routines. Gandt's writing career began in the mid-1970s when he was based in Hong Kong. Season of Storms: The Siege of Hong Kong 1941, was drawn from the newspaper series he produced for the South China Morning Post. His subsequent works were derived from his own experience and connections to military and aviation figures. Gandt's naval aviation chronicle Bogeys and Bandits (Viking, 1997) was adapted for the CBS series Pensacola: Wings of Gold, for which Gandt worked as a writer and technical consultant. The first of his novels, With Hostile Intent, was published by Penguin Group in 2001. With co-author Bill White and with a foreword by Senator John McCain, Gandt wrote Intrepid: The Epic Story of America's Most Legendary Warship (Random House, 2009), which won the Admiral Farragut Book Award. His multi-viewpoint account of the World War II battle for Okinawa, The Twilight Warriors (Random house, 2010) was the winner of the Samuel Eliot Morison Award for Naval Literature. Gandt's best-selling book Angels in the Sky (W.W. Norton, 2017) recounts the saga of the volunteer airmen who fought in Israel's 1948 war of independence. He is a graduate of Charter Oak State College with a B.A in history. He is a member and contributor to The Tailhook Association, The Authors Guild, Mensa International, the Experimental Aircraft Association, Quiet Birdmen and the Naval Order of the United States. Gandt holds a black belt in Shaolin Kempo Karate.

== Works ==
=== Non-fiction ===
- Season of Storms: The Siege of Hong Kong 1941 (SCMP Press, 1981) ASIN BooooEDW4G
- China Clipper: The Age of the Great Flying Boats (Naval Institute Press, 1991/2010) ISBN 978-0870212093
- Skygods: The Fall of Pan Am (Wm. Morrow, 1995/2012) ISBN 978-1888962116
- Bogeys and Bandits: The Making of a Fighter Pilot (Viking, 1997) ISBN 978-0670867219
- Fly Low, Fly Fast: Inside the Reno Air Races (Viking, 1999) ISBN 978-0670884513
- Intrepid: The Epic Story of America's Most Legendary Warship (Broadway/Random House, 2008) ISBN 978-0767929981
- The Twilight Warriors: The Deadliest Naval Battle of WWII and the Men Who Fought It (Broadway/Random House 2010) ISBN 978-0767932424
- Mastery: A Mission Plan for Reclaiming a life of Purpose, Fitness, and Achievement (Dominus Press, 2015) ISBN 978-1516872688
- Angels in the Sky: How a Band of Volunteer Airmen Saved the New State of Israel (WW Norton, 2017) ISBN 978-0-393-25477-8

=== Novels ===
- The President's Pilot (Black Star Press, 2014) ISBN 978-0615995434
- With Hostile Intent (Signet, 2001) ISBN 978-0451204868
- Acts of Vengeance (Signet, 2002) ISBN 978-0451207180
- Black Star (Signet, 2003) ISBN 978-0451210661
- Shadows of War (Signet, 2005) ISBN 978-0451213464
- The Killing Sky (Signet, 2006) ISBN 978-0451216977
- Black Star Rising (Signet, 2007) ISBN 978-0451220141

=== Screen Credits ===
- "Boom," Pensacola: Wings of Gold (CBS TV Series) 1998.
- "Blue Angel," Pensacola: Wings of Gold, 1998.
- "Rules of Engagement," Pensacola: Wings of Gold, 1999.
- Technical consultant, Season 2, Pensacola: Wings of Gold, 1998–99.
- "Chasing Reno Gold," air racing documentary as writer, host, consultant, 2012.

== Awards ==
- Samuel Eliot Morison Award for Naval Literature, 2011, for The Twilight Warriors.
- Admiral Farragut Book Award, 2009, with co-author Bill White for Intrepid.

== In the Media ==
- Commentator on Fox News' "Fox & Friends" television segment titled "Fall to Earth": a discussion about Pan American Airlines.
- Commentator in the BBC Documentary Airline: The Story of Pan Am, titled "Come Fly with Me — The Story of Pan Am" on YouTube, BBC.
- Guest expert speaker in the PBS television series "They made America: Gamblers," discussing Pan Am founder Juan Trippe.
- Commentator in documentary "On the Wings of Giants," on Pan Am.
- Guest speaker in PBS documentary series "Chasing the Sun," on the history of commercial aviation.
- Lecturer, Embry Riddle University President's Series, February 27, 2012.
- Commentator on the three-part PBS series “Across the Pacific,” about Pan Am's historic flying boat era.
