= Larrie D. Ferreiro =

Naval architect and historian

- Born: 11 June 1958 (age 68); Long Island, New York

Academic background
- Education: Imperial College London

Academic work
- Discipline: History
- Institutions: George Mason University

Larrie D. Ferreiro FRHistS is a naval architect and historian.

== Early life ==
He was born and raised on Long Island, New York, United States. His great-grandfather was an immigrant from Galicia, Spain.

== Career ==
He completed his Ph.D at Imperial College London in 2004. He did his M.Sc. and BSE in naval architecture.

He was director of research at the Defense Acquisition University in Fort Belvoir, Virginia, and is an adjunct professor of history at George Mason University. He was previously a naval architect and systems engineer at the Office of Naval Research, Naval Sea Systems Command and US Coast Guard, and an exchange engineer with the French Navy.

He was a Pulitzer Prize finalist in History for his book Brothers at Arms.

== Bibliography ==
Some of his books are:

- Measure of the Earth: The Enlightenment Expedition That Reshaped Our World. New York, NY : Basic Books, 2011, ISBN 9780465063819 OCLC 863172045
- Brothers at Arms: American Independence and the Men of France and Spain Who Saved It. Alfred A. Knopf, 2016. ISBN 9781101875247 OCLC 964397170
- Ships and Science: The Birth of Naval Architecture in the Scientific Revolution, 1600-1800. MIT Press 2006. ISBN 9780262311472 OCLC 743198863
- Bridging the Seas: The Rise of Naval Architecture in the Industrial Age, 1800-2000. MIT Press, 2020. ISBN 9780262538077
- Churchill's American Arsenal: The Partnership Behind the Innovations that Won World War Two. Oxford University Press, 2022. ISBN 9780197554012
