= Eric Jay Dolin =

American author (born 1961)

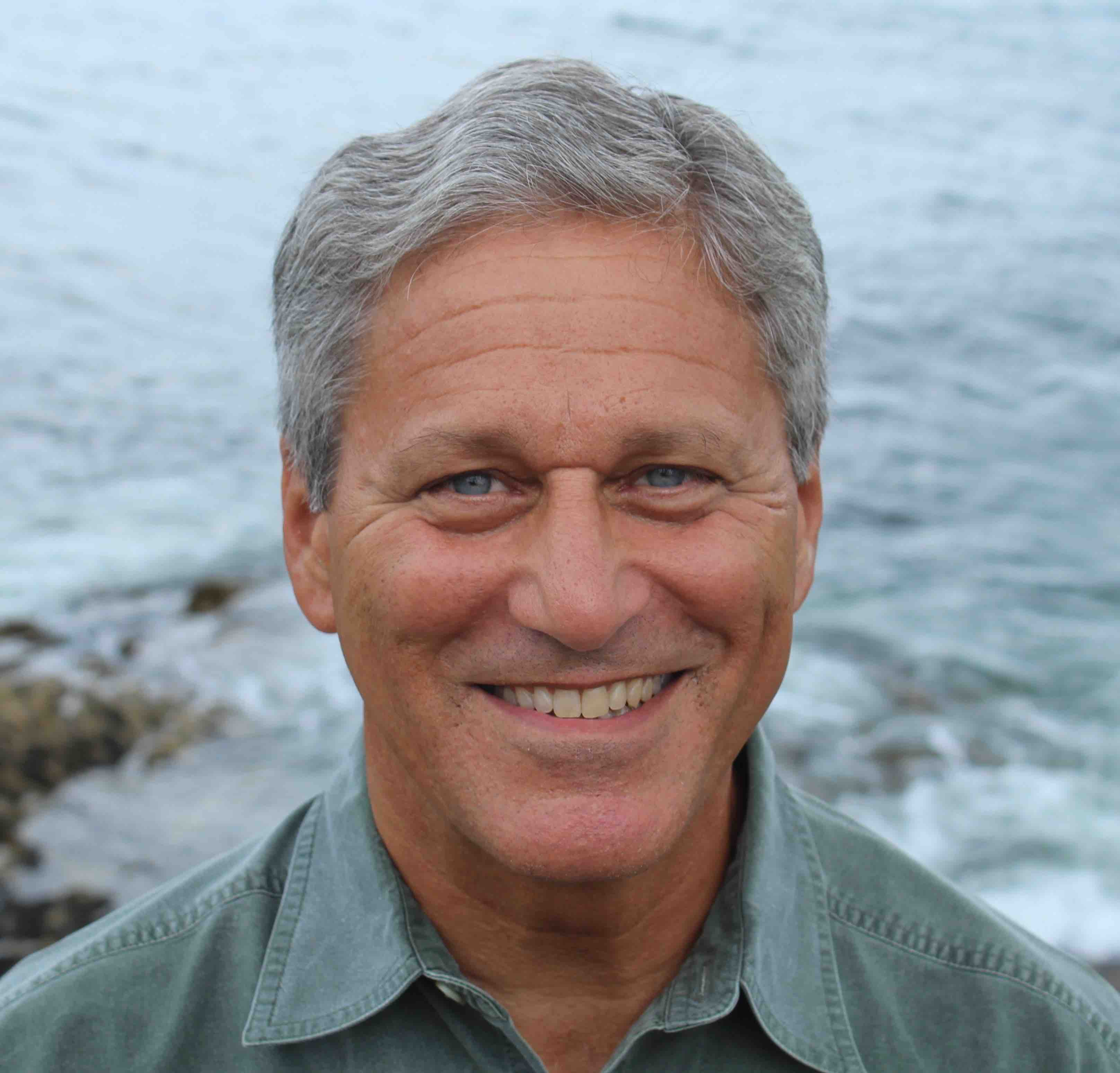
- Born: 1961 (age 64–65); Queens, New York, United States
- Education: Brown University; Yale University; Massachusetts Institute of Technology
- Scientific career
- Fields: History; Environmentalism; Ecology; Geography
- Website: ericjaydolin.com

Eric Jay Dolin (born 1961) is an American author who writes history books, which often focus on maritime topics, wildlife, and the environment. He has published more than a dozen books, which have won numerous awards.

== Education ==
Dolin grew up near the coast in New York and Connecticut, and graduated from Brown University, where he majored in biology and environmental studies. After getting a master's degree in environmental management from the Yale School of Forestry and Environmental Studies, he received his Ph.D. in environmental policy and planning from the Massachusetts Institute of Technology.

== Family ==
Eric and his wife Jennifer live in Marblehead, Massachusetts, with their two children.

== Career ==
Dolin has worked as: (a) program manager at the U.S. Environmental Protection Agency; (b) environmental consultant for (i) Booz Allen Hamilton (MD) and (ii) Environmental Resources Limited (London); (c) an intern (i) at National Wildlife Federation, (ii) at the Massachusetts Office of Coastal Zone Management, and (iii) for Senator Lowell P. Weicker Jr. on Capitol Hill; (d) fisheries policy analyst at the National Marine Fisheries Service; (e) technical writer for the National Transportation Safety Board; (f) PEW research fellow at Harvard Law School; and (g) American Association for the Advancement of Science Mass Media Science and Engineering Fellow at Business Week. Since 2007, he has been a full-time writer.

== Bibliography ==
- The U.S. Fish and Wildlife Service (Know your government) (Chelsea House Publishers, 1989, ISBN 0791008789)
- Dirty Water Clean Water: A Chronology of Events Surrounding the Degradation and Cleanup of Boston Harbor (MIT Sea Grant College Program, 1990, 144 pp., ISBN 1561720011)
- International Environmental Treaty Making (co-authored with Lawrence E. Susskind and J. William Breslin; Program on Negotiation Books, Harvard Law School, 1992, 192 pp., ISBN 1880711028)
- The Duck Stamp Story: Art-Conservation-History (co-author, Bob Dumaine, Krause Publications, 2000, 206 pp., 300 illus., ISBN 0873418158)
- Snakehead: A Fish out of Water (Smithsonian Books, 2003, 266 pp., 58 illus., ISBN 1588341542)
- Smithsonian Book of National Wildlife Refuges (Illustrations by John and Karen Hollingsworth, Smithsonian Books, 2003, 258 pp., 200 illus., ISBN 1588341178)
- Political Waters: The Long, Dirty, Contentious, Incredibly Expensive but Eventually Triumphant History of Boston Harbor – A Unique Environmental Success Story (University of Massachusetts Press, 2004, 240 pp., 40 illus., ISBN 1558494456)
- The Ph.D. Survival Guide (iUniverse, 2005, 140 pp., ISBN 0595350305)
- Leviathan: The History of Whaling In America (W. W. Norton, 2007, 480 pp., 90 illus., ISBN 978-0-393-33157-8)
- Fur, Fortune, and Empire: The Epic History of the Fur Trade in America (W. W. Norton, 2010, 464 pp., 90 illus., ISBN 978-0-393-06710-1)
- When America First Met China: An Exotic History of Tea, Drugs, and Money in the Age of Sail (Liveright Publishing Corporation, 2012, 384 pp., 102 illus., ISBN 978-0-87140-433-6)
- Brilliant Beacons: A History of the American Lighthouse (Liveright, an imprint of W. W. Norton, 2016, 560 pp., 160 illus., ISBN 978-1-63149-250-1).
- Black Flags, Blue Waters: The Epic History of America's Most Notorious Pirates (Liveright, an imprint of W. W. Norton, 2018, 400 pp., 120 illus., ISBN 978-1-63149-210-5
- A Furious Sky: The Five-Hundred-Year History of America's Hurricanes (Liveright, an imprint of W. W. Norton, June 2020)
- Rebels at Sea: Privateering in the American Revolution (Liveright, an imprint of W. W. Norton, May 2022)
- Left for Dead: Shipwreck, Treachery, and Survival at the Edge of the World (Liveright, an imprint of W. W. Norton, May 2024)
- The Wreck of the Mentor: A True Story of Death, Despair, and Deliverance in the Age of Sail. Liveright. 2026. ISBN 978-1324096320.

== Awards ==
Rebels at Sea: Privateering in the American Revolution was awarded the Fraunces Tavern Museum Book Award and the Samuel Eliot Morison Award for Naval Literature, given out by the Naval Order of the United States; and was a finalist for the New England Society Book Award and the Boston Authors Club Julia Ward Howe Book Award. Rebels was also selected as a Must-Read book for 2023 by the Massachusetts Center for the Book.

A Furious Sky: The Five-Hundred-Year History of America's Hurricaneswas a finalist for the Kirkus Prize, and was chosen as one of the 50 Works of Notable Non-Fiction of the year by The Washington Post, and as one of the Best Books of the Year by the Library Journal. It was also selected as a "Must-Read" book by the Massachusetts Center for the Book for 2020, as an "Editor's Choice" selection by The New York Times Book Review, and was the winner of Atmospheric Science Librarians International Choice Award for History.

Black Flags, Blue Waters: The Epic History of America's Most Notorious Pirates was chosen as a "Must-Read" book for 2019 by the Massachusetts Center for the Book; as a finalist for the 2019 Julia Ward Howe Award given by the Boston Author's Club; and it was selected by Goodreads as one of September's top five History/Biography titles recommended in their monthly New Releases e-mail.

Brilliant Beacons: A History of the American Lighthouse was chosen by Captain and Classic Boat Best Nautical Book of 2016.

When America First Met China: An Exotic History of Tea, Drugs, and Money in the Age of Sail was chosen by Kirkus Reviews as one of the top 100 nonfiction books for 2012; won a gold medal for history in the 2013 Independent Publisher Book Awards; and was chosen by the Boston Author's Club as a "Highly Recommended Book."

Fur, Fortune, and Empire: The Epic History of the Fur Trade in America won the 2010 James P. Hanlan Book Award, given by the New England Historical Association; a bronze medal for history in the 2011 Independent Publisher Book Awards; and was awarded first place in the Outdoor Writers Association of America, Excellence in Craft Contest.

Leviathan: The History of Whaling in America won the 2007 John Lyman Award for U.S. Maritime History; the twenty-third annual L. Byrne Waterman Award, given by the New Bedford Whaling Museum, for outstanding contributions to whaling research and history; a silver medal in the 2008 Independent Publisher Book Awards.

The Duck Stamp Story: Art, Conservation, History (Krause Publications, 2000) won the gold medal for books at the 2001 American Philatelic Society Stampshow.

Dolin has been awarded an E. Geoffrey and Elizabeth Thayer Verney Fellowship, Nantucket Historical Association (2005); a Martin Environmental Fellowship, MIT (1990–1991); a Switzer Environmental Fellowship (1990–1991 and 1989–1990)l and a C.V. Starr Fellowship for National Service, Brown University (1982–1983). In 2007, the Intergovernmental Panel on Climate Change presented Dolin with a certificate recognizing his contribution to the joint award of the Nobel Peace Prize for 2007 to the IPCC.
