= John K. Mahon =

American historian

- Born: February 8, 1912
- Died: October 11, 2003 (aged 91)
- Education: Swarthmore College (BA); University of California, Los Angeles (PhD)
- Scientific career
- Fields: History
- Workplaces: University of Florida

John K. Mahon (February 8, 1912 – October 11, 2003) was an American historian.

He received his BA from Swarthmore College in 1934, graduating as a member of Phi Beta Kappa. After serving in World War II and working for his family he later returned to his studies and earned his PhD in history from UCLA in 1950.

During WWII he was drafted by the U.S. Army, or as he liked to say it, was "selected by his neighbors," and served in the European Theater of Operations (ETO) as an artillery officer, leaving the army after the war as a captain. From 1951 to 1954, he served as Civilian Military Historian in the Office of the Chief of Military History in Washington, D.C.

In 1954, Mahon accepted a teaching position in the history department at the University of Florida. His interest in military history and the Seminoles led to three books, as well as numerous articles for encyclopedias and historical journals.

His work History of the Second Seminole War, 1835–1842 is considered by some as the authoritative modern reference on the little-known but regional and nationally important last great war of Indian removal east of the Mississippi. Mahon documents the American, Seminole and Black cultures, leaders, and tactics of the war.

Mahon served as the chairman of the history department at the University of Florida from 1965 to 1973.

After retiring in 1982, Mahon continued to pursue his interest in history. In addition, he was a founder of the Alachua Audubon Society and Florida Defenders of the Environment. He also held leadership positions in the local Sierra Club, the Florida Historical Society, and the Seminole Wars Historic Foundation.

== Selected works ==
- The History of the Second Seminole War, 1835–1842 (Gainesville, FL: University of Florida Press, 1967)
- The War of 1812 (Gainesville, FL: University of Florida Press, 1972) ISBN 0-8130-0318-0
- The History of the Militia and National Guard (New York: Macmillan, 1983) ISBN 0-02-919750-3
