= Robert Shenk =

American professor and author

Robert Edwards Shenk (1943-2021) was an American professor and an author. He taught English at the University of New Orleans for 34 years. He was also the director of the school's English master's degree program, and an emeritus professor.

== Early life and education ==
Shenk was born on April 10, 1943 in Lawrence, Kansas. He was the son of Henry A. Shenk, a professor at the University of Kansas, and Katherine Frick Shenk. Shenk graduated from Lawrence High School. He received his bachelor of arts in English from the University of Kansas. He later obtained a PhD in English Literature from the University of Kansas.

== Military career ==
Shenk joined the United States Navy in 1965 and served in the Vietnam War as a communications officer and on river patrol boats.

He was discharged and returned to study for his PhD. He was recalled to the Navy and taught at both the U.S. Naval Academy at Annapolis and the U.S. Air Force Academy in Colorado.

In 1974, as a lieutenant, he was assigned to a new U.S. Naval Reserve unit in Parsons, Kansas. He would retire in 1994, having reached the rank of captain in the Naval Reserve.

== Academic career ==
Shenk joined the staff of the University of New Orleans about 1985 where he taught English for more than 30 years. In particular, Shenk was known for a popular course on John Milton. Shenk retired from the university in 2019.

Shenk published nine books, including Black Sea Fleet: the U.S. Navy Amidst War and Revolution, 1919-1923 as author and The Greek Genocide in American Naval War Diaries, which he edited with Sam Koktzoglou. Shenk was also a literary critic.

== Critical reception ==
Of his book, Black Sea Fleet: the U.S. Navy Amidst War and Revolution, 1919-1923, Geoffrey Till, writing in the International Journal of Turkish Studies, said it was "a very difficult book to review fairly, since it is such a striking mixture of the good and the frankly bad... [the book's] review of local American naval reports on the tumultuous events that transformed Turkey between 1915 and 1923 can hardly fail to command interest,... The book is also a portrayal of naval engagement in action, a case study of what navies are used for when there's no war to fight... Sadly, though... there is no real investigation of what the U.S. Navy was supposed to be doing in Constantinople in the first place. Indeed, the book's title is profoundly mis-leading in that there is very little in it of real substance about the Black Sea Fleet per se. [The book] rambles from topic to topic without analyzing or even clearly explaining them.... The subjects he deals with are critically important-especially now; they deserve much better treatment. Paradoxically, much of the material needed for this can be found in this book."

Of the book The Greek Genocide in American Naval War Diaries, Thomas Blake Earle, writing in Genocide Studies and Prevention: An International Journal said, about the book's treatment of "the ethnic cleansing of Roman Greeks in the Pontus region of Asia Minor in 1921 and 1922... Editors Robert Shenk and Sam Koktzoglou look to open the documentary record of this [genocide] in the larger story of ethnic violence of the early twentieth century.... This volume constitutes a case study of what individuals in institutions like the U.S. Navy can do in the face of atrocities... For policymakers, service members, and researchers alike, this collection is a valuable resource."

Michael Imprenda, in the Naval War College Review, wrote "In the aftermath of the First World War, the Ottoman Empire disintegrated into a bloody intercommunal conflict...There to witness it was the U.S. Black Sea Fleet...The accounts capture the conflicting narratives heard, the incomplete information available, and the sense of impotence felt by U.S. naval officers with no sanction to intervene.... Shenk and Koktzoglou make the case that elements of the Turkish government were involved in a [...] genocide.... The [book] is a compelling, primary-source resource for scholars seeking to understand the human face of sea power in the twentieth century."

== Personal life and death ==
Shenk married Paula Elshire in the early 1970s.

Shenk died on January 30, 2021. He was 77.

== Selected publications ==
- "The Left-Handed Mon-key Wrench". The Naval Institute Press. 1986
- Authors at Sea: Modern American Writers Remember their Naval Service. U.S. Naval Institute Press. 1996
- Admiral Dan Gallery: The Life and Wit of a Navy Original, U.S. Naval Institute Press. 1999
- The Naval Institute Guidelines to Naval Writing: Authors at Sea (a History Book Club Selection). U.S. Naval Institute Press. 2011
- America's Black Sea Fleet: The U.S. Navy Amidst War and Revolution, 1919-1923. U.S. Naval Institute Press. 2012
- The Greek Genocide in American Naval War Diaries: Naval Commanders Report and Protest Death Marches and Massacres in Turkey's Pontus Region, 1921-1922. UNO Press. 2020
