= A Science on the Scales =

2011 book by Jennifer Hubbard

A Science on the Scales: The Rise of Canadian Atlantic Fisheries Biology, 1898-1939
- Author: Jennifer Hubbard
- Language: English
- Subject: Environmental history; fisheries management; fisheries biology
- Published: 2006
- Publication place: Canada
- Media type: Print
- Pages: 300
- ISBN: 9780802088598

A Science on the Scales: The Rise of Canadian Atlantic Fisheries Biology, 1898-1939 is a 2011 book by Jennifer Hubbard. The book provides an analysis of Canadian fisheries history with the tools of the professional historian, whereas most earlier works on the topic came from fisheries scientists themselves.

The book traces the development of fisheries science in Canada in the first decades of the twentieth century. Fisheries biology arose in the mid-1800s in Northern Europe from concerns around the conservation of what appeared to be dwindling stocks in the face of new technology. Marine biological stations were established in Europe in the last decades of the nineteenth century—particularly in Naples (the Stazione Zoologica Anton Dohrn) and Plymouth—but the Canadian Department of Marine and Fisheries, established in 1892, did not see a need for one in Canada, though a floating station on board a scow was eventually set up.

The book "surveys the tortuous process by which the Biological Board of Canada was established in 1912 to supersede a board of management that had overseen a floating biological station off the Atlantic coast since 1898, and permanent stations at St. Andrews, New Brunswick, and Nanaimo, British Columbia, since 1908." Norwegian zoologist Johan Hjort and American ichthyologist David Starr Jordan were both consulted on Canadian fisheries issues in the early period.

The Biological Board eventually became the Fisheries Research Board, but Hubbard explains that "its activities [were] perennially challenged and eventually usurped by federal departments" while constantly hampered by conflicting priorities among its federal funders and the academic biologists who volunteered as its staff. The book also explores the conflicts between the academic knowledge of biologists and the local and craft knowledge of fishers.

While the main focus of the book—the establishment of the structural components of Canadian fisheries biology—ends around 1940, its importance comes in part from its explication of the historical structure of Canadian fisheries science just a decade after the catastrophic collapse of the Atlantic northwest cod fishery in the 1990s, which the book engages in an extended epilogue. The book's explanation of "the complex tensions that result when a problem places science, business, government, and environment at potential cross-purposes" thus provides useful background for understanding the collapse.

In its analysis of the background of collapse, the book is part of a growing effort in the early twenty-first century to historicize the ocean, and particularly fisheries, following marine biologist Daniel Pauly's identification of the "shifting baseline" concept in the measurement of fish populations over time.

== See also ==
- All the Fish in the Sea: Maximum Sustainable Yield and the Failure of Fisheries Management by Carmel Finley
