= John H. Schroeder =

John Schroeder is an American educator and administrator. He was chancellor of University of Wisconsin–Milwaukee from 1991 to 1998.

== Background ==
Schroeder graduated from Lewis and Clark College with a B. A. in 1965 and received an MA and Ph.D. from University of Virginia in 1967 and 1971 respectively.

Schroeder teaches history at University of Wisconsin– Milwaukee. His teaching and research areas are 19th Century U.S. History – Political, Diplomatic, Maritime & Naval. He has written several books and articles.

He was the class of 1957 Heritage Chair History professor at the United States Naval Academy during the 2010–2011 school year.

== Academic administration ==
Schroeder created long-term strategic planning at the university and emphasized research on campus. During his time as chancellor, University of Wisconsin–Milwaukee was named one of the 125 Research II universities named by the Carnegie Foundation.
