= Samuel Eliot Morison Award for Naval Literature =

1982-established accolade for works related to the United States Navy

The Samuel Eliot Morison Award for Naval Literature is for literature about the United States Navy. The award was planned in 1982 and first issued the next year by the New York Commandery of the Naval Order of the United States, who administers and chooses the winner which is a significant book on naval history from the prior year.

The prize is named for Rear Admiral Samuel Eliot Morison, a military historian.

== Awardees ==
Samuel Eliot Morison Award for Naval Literature

- 1983 Samuel Eliot Morison, honorary on launch of new award
- 1984 Victor H. Krulak, First to Fight: An Inside View of the U.S. Marine Corps
- 1987 Ivan Musicant, Battleship at War: The Epic Story of the USS Washington
- 1988 Michael A. Palmer, Stoddert's War: Naval Operations during the Quasi-war with France, 1798-1801
- 1989 John F. Lehman, Command of the Seas: Building the 600 Ship Navy
- 1992 Clark G. Reynolds, Admiral John H. Towers: The Struggle for Naval Air Supremacy
- 1993 Eugene B. Fluckey, Thunder Below!: The USS Barb Revolutionizes Submarine Warfare in World War II
- 1995 John B. Lundstrom, The First Team and the Guadalcanal Campaign: Naval Fighter Combat from August to November 1942
- 1997 Joseph H. Alexander, Storm Landings: Epic Amphibious Battles in the Central Pacific
- 1998 Ivan Musicant, Empire by Default: The Spanish–American War and the Dawn of the American Century
- 1999 Edward L. Beach, Jr., Salt and Steel: Reflections of a Submariner
- 2000 Edwin H. Simmons, Dog Company Six
- 2001 Donald Chisolm, Waiting for Dead Men's Shoes: Origins and Development of the U.S. Navy's Officer Personnel System, 1793-1941
- 2002 Norman Friedman, Seapower As Strategy: Navies and National Interests
- 2003 John F. Lehman, On Seas of Glory: Heroic Men, Great Ships, and Epic Battles of the American Navy
- 2004 James D. Hornfischer, The Last Stand of the Tin Can Sailors
- 2005 Michael Walling, Bloodstained Sea: The U.S. Coast Guard in the Battle of the Atlantic, 1941-1944
- 2006 Joseph F. Callo, John Paul Jones: America's First Sea Warrior
- 2007 Ian W. Toll, Six Frigates: Epic History of Founding of the US Navy
- 2008 George C. Daughan, If by Sea: Forging of the US Navy
- 2009 James L. Nelson, George Washington's Secret Navy: How the American Revolution Went to Sea
- 2010 James Scott, The Attack on the Liberty: The Untold Story of Israel's Deadly 1967 Assault on a U.S. Spy Ship
- 2011 Robert Gandt, The Twilight Warriors: The Deadliest Naval Battle of WWII
- 2012 Elliot Carlson, Joe Rochefort's War: The Odyssey of the Codebreaker Who Outwitted Yamamoto at Midway
- 2013 Walter R. Borneman, The Admirals: Nimitz, Halsey, Leahy, and King — The Five-Star Admirals Who Won the War at Sea
- 2014 Jack Cheevers, Act of War: Lyndon Johnson, North Korea, and the Capture of the Spy Ship Pueblo
- 2015 Craig L. Symonds, Neptune: The Allied Invasion of Europe and the D-Day Landings
- 2016 Tim McGrath, Give Me a Fast Ship: The Continental Navy and America's Revolution at Sea
- 2017 Richard Snow, Iron Dawn: The Monitor, the Merrimack, and the Civil War Sea Battle that Changed History
- 2018 John F. Wukovits, Tin Can Titans: The Heroic Men and Ships of World War II's Most Decorated Navy Destroyer Squadron
- 2019 Hampton Sides, On Desperate Ground: The Marines at The Reservoir, the Korean War's Greatest Battle
- 2020–2021 M. Ernest Marshall, Rear Admiral Herbert V. Wiley: A Career in Airships and Battleships
- 2022 Paul Stillwell, Battleship Commander: The Life of Vice Admiral Willis A. Lee Jr.
- 2023 Eric Jay Dolin, Rebels at Sea: Privateering in the American Revolution
- 2024 Nicholas Lambert, The Neptune Factor: Alfred Thayer Mahan and the Concept of Sea Power

Samuel Eliot Morison Award for Distinguished Contribution to Naval Literature

- Thomas B. Buell, The Quiet Warrior: A Biography of Admiral Raymond A. Spruance
