= Walter R. Borneman =

American writer

- Born: January 5, 1952 (age 73)
- Education: Western Colorado University (BA, MA); University of Denver (JD)

Walter R. Borneman (born January 5, 1952), is an American historian and lawyer. He is the author of well-known popular books on 18th and 19th century United States history.

== Education ==
He received his B.A. in 1974 from Western State College of Colorado, and received an M.A. in history there in 1975 for a thesis on "Irwin : silver camp of the Ruby Mountains"; in 1981 he received a J.D. degree from the University of Denver, and practiced law.

== Career ==
In May 2012, his work The Admirals: Nimitz, Halsey, Leahy, and King—The 5-star Admirals Who Won the War at Sea was published by Little, Brown and Co. It won the 2013 Samuel Eliot Morison Award for Naval Literature. In April 2009, Random House Trade Paperbacks published his biography of James K. Polk, the eleventh President of the United States: Polk: The Man Who Transformed the Presidency and America.ISBN 978-0812976748

He also wrote the book, American Spring which covers the Revolutionary War from its onset to the Battle of Bunker Hill. His latest book is MacArthur at War: World War II in the Pacific.

He has also written several books about mountaineering in Colorado, where he currently lives.

== His works ==
=== History ===
- Borneman, Walter R. Iron Horse: America's Race to Bring the Railroads West. New York: Back Bay Books, 2014.
- Borneman, Walter R. Rival Rails: The Race to Build America's Greatest Transcontinental Railroad. New York: Random House, 2010.
  - Review, Los Angeles Times - Oct 3, 2010
  - Review BusinessWeek - Oct 20, 2010
- Borneman, Walter R. Polk: The Man Who Transformed the Presidency and America. New York: Random House, 2008 ISBN 978-1-4000-6560-8
  - Review Wall Street Journal Online - May 16, 2008
- Borneman, Walter R. The French and Indian War: Deciding the Fate of North America. New York: HarperCollins Publishers, 2006. ISBN 978-0-06-076184-4 .
  - Review, The New York Times book review. (December 17, 2006): 14
  - Review, Providence Journal - Jan 28, 2007
- Borneman, Walter R. 1812: The War That Forged a Nation. New York: HarperCollins Publishers, 2004. ISBN 978-0-06-053112-6.
- Borneman, Walter R. Alaska: Saga of a Bold Land. New York: HarperCollins, 2003.
  - Translated into Russian as Borneman, Walter R, V V. Monakhov, and L A. Rusova. Сага о земле Аляска / Saga o zemle Ali︠a︡ska. Vladivostok: Dalʹnauka, 2009. OCLC 704059097.
  - Review, Juneau Empire - Apr 13, 2003

=== Colorado ===
- Borneman, Walter R. and Lampert, Lyndon J. A Climbing Guide to Colorado’s Fourteeners: The Classic Guide to Colorado's Fourteeners, Boulder, CO: Pruett Publishing Company, 1994.
