= Siege of Damascus (1400) =

Siege of Damascus by the Timurid Empire

- Part of Timurid conquests and invasions
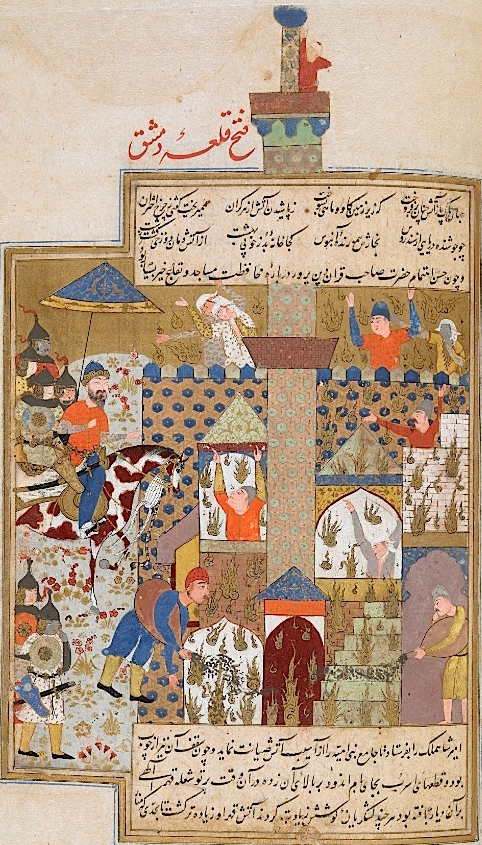
- Siege of Damascus (detail). Timur watches the flames as the city burns. Ẓafarnāmah, 16th century, Shiraz (British Library, IO Islamic 137)
Date	December 1400 – March 1401
Location	Damascus, Mamluk Sultanate (present day Syria) 33.513056°N 36.309444°E
Result	Timurid victory

Belligerents
Timurid Empire	Mamluk Sultanate

Commanders and leaders
Timur	Nasir-ad-Din Faraj

Strength
Unknown	Unknown

Casualties and losses
Unknown	50,000 killed, 30,000 of them were burned.
- Location within Syria Siege of Damascus (1400) (West and Central Asia)

The siege of Damascus (also known as the Sack of Damascus and the Capture of Damascus) was a major event in 1400–01 during the war between the Timurid Empire and the Mamluk Sultanate.

== Background ==
Timur was one of the most powerful Central Asian rulers since Genghis Khan. By long and relentless fighting, he sought to rebuild the Mongol Empire of his predecessors.

Prior to attacking Syrian cities, Timur had initially sent an ambassador to Damascus who was executed by the city's Mamluk viceroy, Sudun. (Note: Sudun became prisoner of Timur, and later died in March 1401.) In 1400, he started a war with the Mamluk sultan of Egypt Nasir-ad-Din Faraj and invaded Mamluk Syria. Timur's forces took Aleppo in November 1400. He massacred many of the inhabitants, ordering the building of a tower of 20,000 skulls outside the city. After taking Aleppo, Timur continued his advance where he took Hama, along with nearby Homs and Baalbek, and besieged Damascus.

== Battle ==
Timur had initially camped at Qubbat Sayyar near Al-Rabweh, west of Damascus. He then raided the surroundings of the city including Qatana, Al-Kiswah, Darayya, Lake Hula, and Hauran.

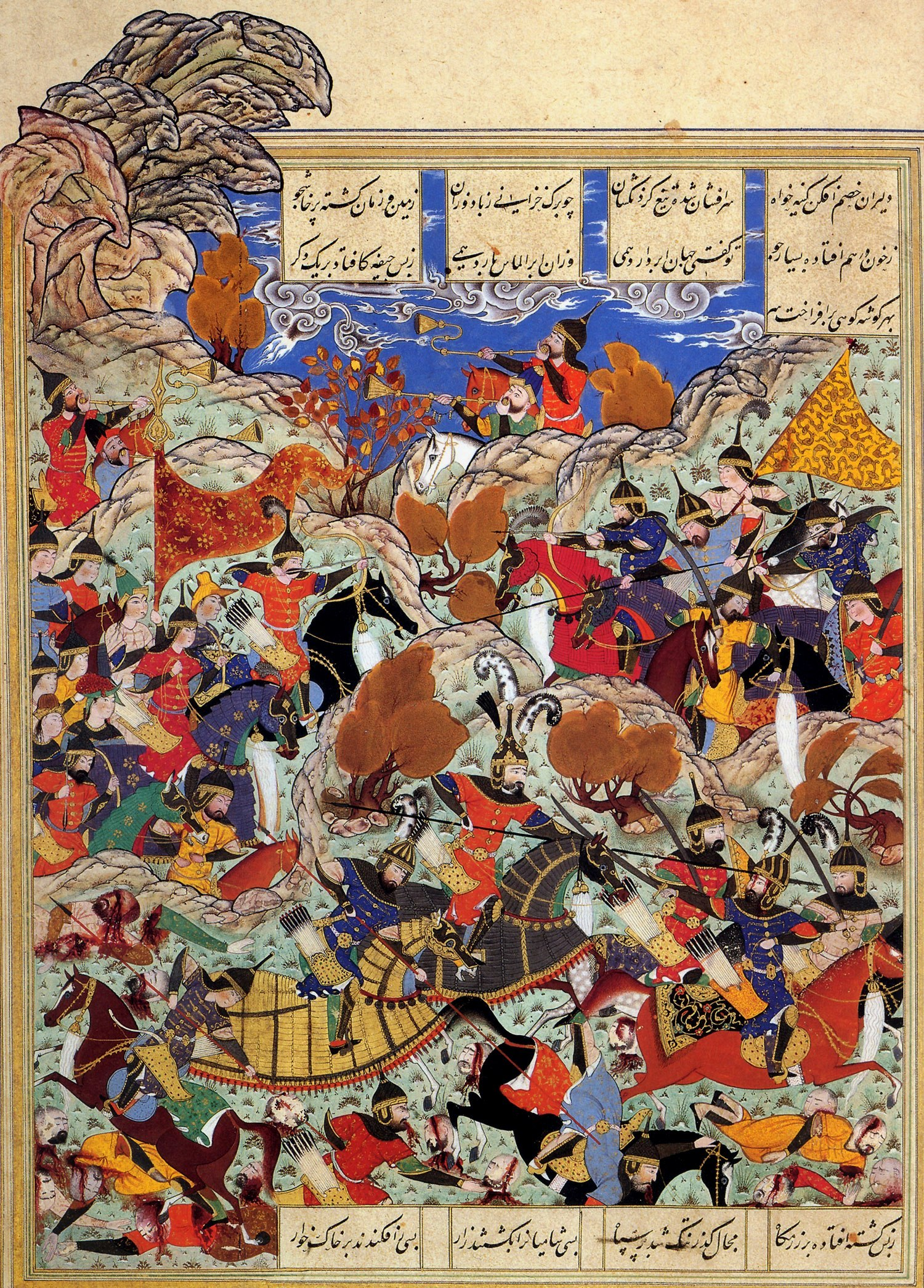
Timur defeating the Mamluk Sultan Nasir-ad-Din Faraj

He later fought an army led by the Mamluk Sultan Nasir-ad-Din Faraj which was defeated outside Damascus leaving the city at the mercy of the Mongol besiegers. With his army defeated by January 1401, the Mamluk sultan dispatched a deputation from Cairo, including Ibn Khaldun, who negotiated with him, but after their withdrawal he put the city to sack.

One particularly distressing incident, verified by independent eyewitnesses, was the burning of the famous Umayyad Mosque in March 1401, and many others including the Baibars' al-Ablaq Palace (The Striped Palace), where the current Tekkiye Mosque is located. Noted imams and religious priests went to Timur and asked for his mercy in the name of Allah. He falsely assured them to take shelter in mosques with their women and children. When thus they totaled more than 30,000 people; he got the doors locked and burnt them alive. Mass rapes were also recorded. In addition, men and women were taken into slavery. A huge number of the city's artisans were taken to Timur's capital at Samarkand. These were the luckier citizens: many were slaughtered and their heads piled up in a field outside the north-east corner of the walls, where a city square still bears the name "Burj al-Ru'us" (between modern-day Al-Qassaa and Bab Tuma), originally the tower of heads.

== Aftermath ==
After the capture of Damascus, Timur's Turco-Mongol empire now bordered another emerging power in the region, the Ottoman Empire. The two powers soon came into direct conflict. Bayezid demanded tribute from one of the Anatolian Beyliks who had pledged loyalty to Timur and threatened to invade. Timur interpreted this action as an insult to himself, and in 1402 he moved his army towards the Ottoman city of Sebaste (modern Sivas). (Note: Timur forces had already sacked Sivas in 1400.) Timur would later go on to defeat the Ottoman Sultan Bayezid at the Battle of Ankara.

During his Siege of Smyrna in December 1402, Timur sent an envoy to Damietta to inform the Mamluks of his victory over the Ottomans and to conclude a peace treaty, with Timur promising not to encroach on Mamluk lands; to which Faraj agreed.

== Bibliography ==
- Darke, Diana (2010). Syria. Bradt Travel Guides. ISBN 9781841623146.
- Ibn Khaldūn (1952). Ibn Khaldun and Tamerlane. University of California Press.
- le Strange, Guy (1890), Palestine Under the Moslems: A Description of Syria and the Holy Land from A.D. 650 to 1500, Committee of the Palestine Exploration Fund.
- Tucker, Spencer C. (2011). Battles That Changed History: An Encyclopedia of World Conflict. ABC-CLIO. ISBN 978-1-59884-429-0.
