= Theodore and Franklin D. Roosevelt Prize in Naval History =

The Theodore and Franklin D. Roosevelt Prize in Naval History was an annual prize given between 1986 and 2011 by The New York Council of the Navy League of the United States, the Roosevelt Institute, and the Theodore Roosevelt Association. It was given for the best book on American naval history published in the previous calendar year. The prize commemorated Theodore Roosevelt and Franklin D. Roosevelt, who both served as Assistant Secretary of the Navy, and who both supported the United States Navy as presidents of the United States.

The judges for the prize included specialists in naval history such as faculty members at the U.S. Naval Academy, U.S. Naval War College, U.S. Merchant Marine Academy, U.S. Coast Guard Academy, U.S. Military Academy, The Citadel, and Princeton University.

== List of prize winners ==
- 1986 — Ronald Spector, Eagle Against the Sun, (Vintage Books, 1985)
- 1987 — Edward L. Beach, Jr., The United States Navy: 200 Years, (Henry Holt, 1986)
- 1988 — Robert Erwin Johnson, Guardians of the Sea: A History of the U.S. Coast Guard, 1915 to the Present, (Naval Institute Press, 1987)
- 1989 — James R. Reckner, Teddy Roosevelt’s Great White Fleet: The World Cruise of the American Battle Fleet, 1907–1909, (Naval Institute Press, 1988)
- 1990 — B. Mitchell Simpson, Admiral Harold R. Stark: Architect of Victory, 1939–1945, (University of South Carolina Press, 1989)
- 1991 — Francis Duncan, Rickover and the Nuclear Navy: The Discipline of Technology, (Naval Institute Press, 1990)
- 1992 — Edward Miller, War Plan Orange: The U.S. Strategy to Defeat Japan, 1897–1945, (Naval Institute Press, 1991)
- 1993 — Townsend Hoopes and Douglas Brinkley, Driven Patriot: The Life and Times of James Forrestal, (Knopf, 1992)
- 1994 — Gary Weir, Forged in War: The Naval-Industrial Complex and American Submarine Construction, 1940–1961, (Naval Historical Center, 1993)
- 1995 — Joseph H. Alexander, Utmost Savagery: The Three Days of Tarawa (Naval Institute Press, 1995)
- 1996 — Raimondo Luraghi, The History of the Confederate Navy, (Naval Institute Press, 1996)
- 1997 — James McPherson and Patricia McPherson, Lamson of the Gettysburg: The Civil War Letters of Lieutenant Roswell H. Lamson, USN, (Oxford University Press, 1997)
- 1998 — Sherry Sontag and Christopher Drew, with Annette Lawrence Drew, Blind Man’s Bluff: The Untold Story of American Submarine Espionage, (Public Affairs Press, 1998)
- 1999 — Edward Marolda and Robert J. Schneller, Jr., Shield and Sword: The United States Navy and the Persian Gulf War, (United States Naval Institute, 1999)
- 2000 — Bill Gilbert, Ship of Miracles, (Triumph Books, 2000)
- 2001 — John H. Schroeder, Matthew Calbraith Perry: Antebellum Sailor and Diplomat, (Naval Institute Press, 2001)
- 2002 — Greg Kennedy, Anglo-American Strategic Relations and the Far East 1933–1939, (Frank Cass Publishers, 2001)
- 2003 — Nathaniel Philbrick, Sea of Glory: America's Voyage of Discovery, the U.S. Exploring Expedition, 1838–1842, (Viking, 2003)
- 2004 — Spencer Tucker, Stephen Decatur: A Life Most Bold and Daring, (Naval Institute Press, 2004)
- 2005 — Craig Symonds, Decision at Sea: Five Naval Battles that Shaped American History, (Oxford University Press, 2005)
- 2006 — Evan Thomas, Sea of Thunder: Four Naval Commanders and the Last Sea War (2006)
- 2007 — William N. Still, Jr., Crisis at Sea: the United States Navy in European waters in World War I, University Press of Florida, 2006.
- 2008 — Jonathan Reed Winkler, Nexus: Strategic Communications and American Security in World War I, Harvard University Press, 2008.
- 2009 — Jeffrey G. Barlow, From Hot War to Cold: The U.S. Navy and National Security Affairs, 1945-1955, Stanford University Press, 2009.
- 2010 - Geoffrey Rossano, Stalking The U-Boat: U.S. Naval Aviation In Europe During World War I University Press of Florida, 2010.
- 2011 - Elliot Carlson, Joe Rochefort's War: The Odyssey of the Codebreaker Who Outwitted Yamamoto at Midway U.S. Naval Institute Press, 2011.

== See also ==
- List of history awards

== Sources ==
- Franklin and Eleanor Roosevelt Institute
- New York Council Navy League of the United States
