= Sack of Aleppo (1400) =

Timurid victory in Syria over the Mamluks

- Part of the Timurid conquests and invasions
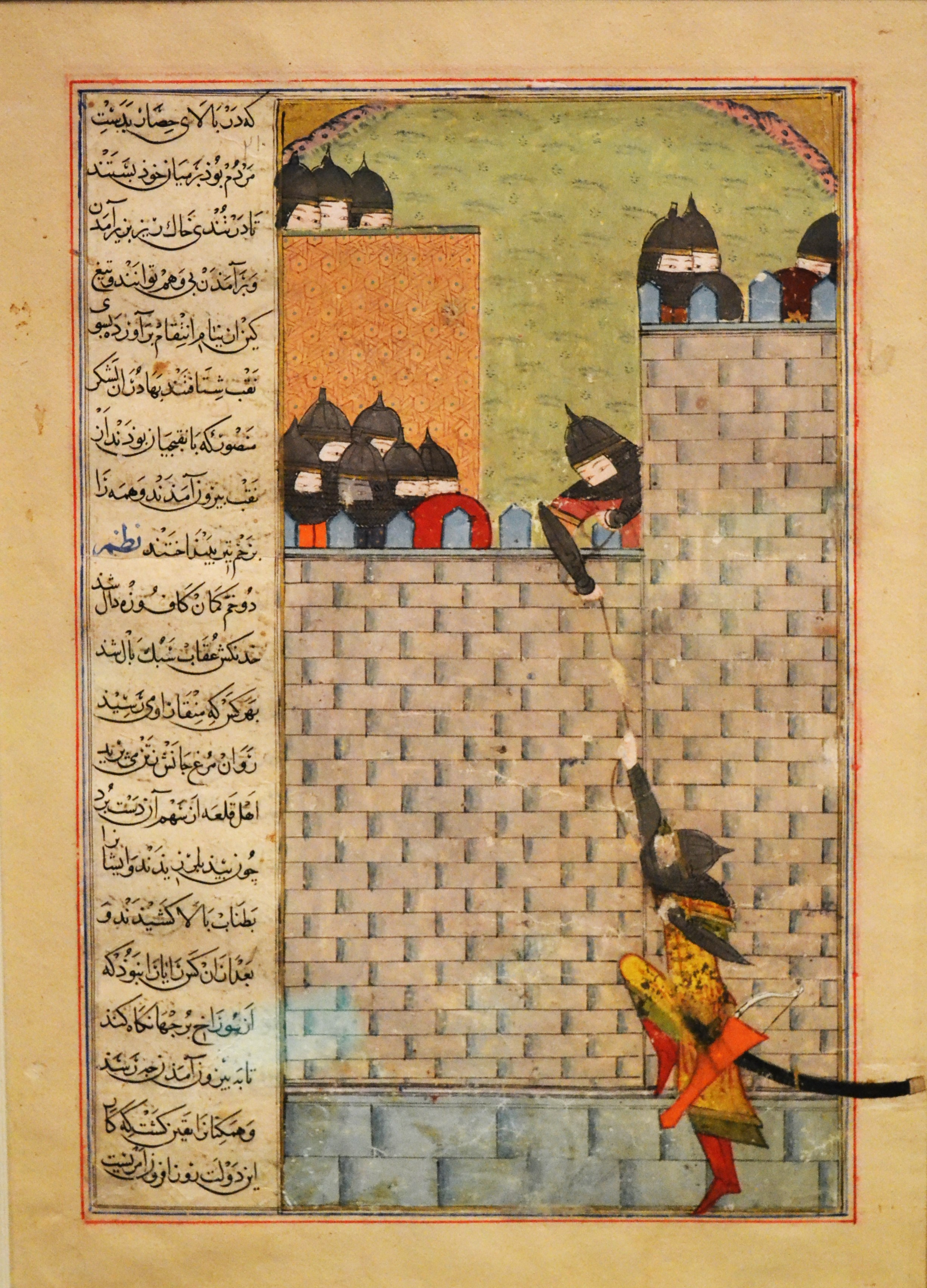
- Timur attacks the walls of Aleppo in mid-November 1400, Zafarnama (1436)
Date	October–November 1400
Location	Aleppo, Mamluk Sultanate (modern-day Syria) 36.2°N 37.16°E
Result	Timurid victory

Belligerents
Timurid Empire	Mamluk Sultanate

Commanders and leaders
Timur; Miran Shah; Shah Rukh; Emirzade Sultan Huseyin Bahadir; Ebubekir Bahadir; Emir Süleymansah; Emir Cihanshah; Emir Shah Melik; Sultan Mahmud Khan	An-Nasir Faraj; Tamardash (POW); Sudun (POW); Al-Mu'ayyad Shaykh (POW); Altunbuga Osmani (POW); Omer b. Tahhani (POW); Sheikh Ali El Haseki (POW); Emir İzzeddin Ozdemir †; Emir Uzbek Yasbek †

Strength
Unknown	30,000–35,000

Casualties and losses
Small	Almost destroyed (civilians massacred after war)
- Location within Syria Sack of Aleppo (1400) (West and Central Asia)

The sack of Aleppo was a major event in 1400 during the war between the Timurid Empire and the Mamluk Sultanate.

== Background ==
In 1400, Timur's Mongol forces invaded Armenia and Georgia, then they took Sivas, Malatya and Aintab. Later on, Timur's Mongol forces advanced towards Aleppo with caution, where they tended to construct a fortified camp each night as they approach the city. According to 15th century Sufi historian Abd al-Rahman al-Bistami, Timur gathered Mongol armies, bringing together every scoundrel and trickster, unleashing heresies and horrors, shedding blood and pillaging properties. Then, on the fifth of Rabi' I of 803 [24 October 1400] he descended upon the lands of Aleppo in its golden fields."

== Battle ==
The Mamluks assembled a formidable army of 30,000 to 35,000 soldiers and established their camp near Aleppo. They waited for the arrival of the Timurid forces, which eventually appeared before the city. On the first day, minor skirmishes broke out between the two sides. After a brief standoff, the Syrian commanders resolved to engage the Timurid forces in a full-scale battle on the third day.

After two days of skirmishing, Timur's cavalry moved swiftly in arc shapes to attack the flanks of their enemy lines, while his center including elephants from India held firm. Al-Mu'ayyad Shaykh, regent of Tripoli counterattacked bravely, causing casualties, while Emir İzzeddin Özdemir and his son Emir Uzbek Yasbek killed many Timurids before being surrounded and killed. Fierce cavalry attacks forced the Mamluks, led by Tamardash, governor of Aleppo, to break and flee towards the city gates. Afterwards, Timur began his destruction of Aleppo, on October 30, 1400, and the destruction was completed with the city's surrender by November 2. Timur then massacred many of the inhabitants, ordering the building of a tower of 20,000 skulls outside the city.

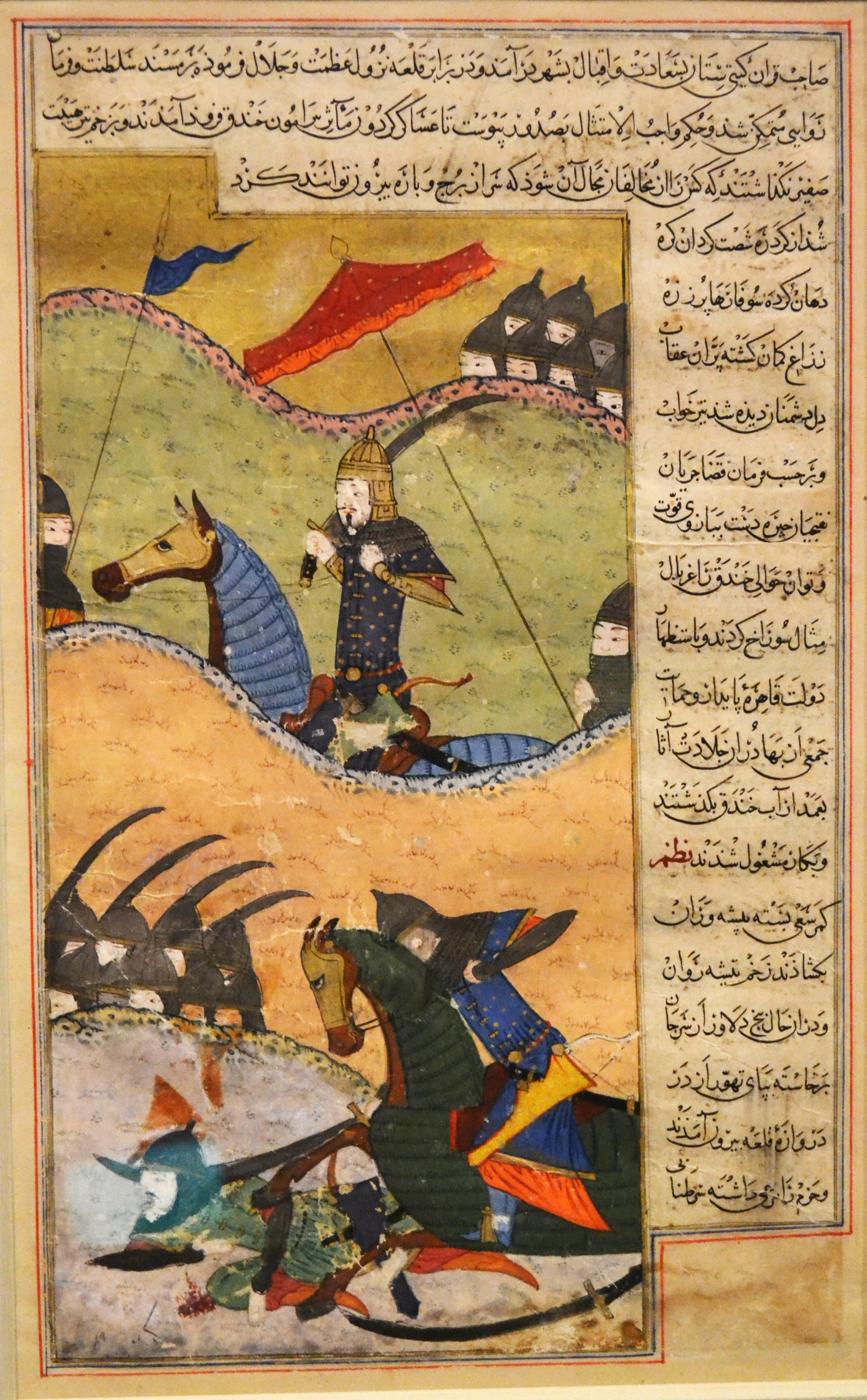
Timur attacks Aleppo in mid-November 1400, Zafarnama (1436)

During Timur's invasion of Syria in the Siege of Aleppo, Ibn Taghribirdi wrote that Timur's soldiers committed mass rape on the women of Aleppo, massacring their children and forcing the brothers and fathers of the women to watch the gang rapes which took place in the mosques. Ibn Taghribirdi said the Mongols killed all children while tying the women with ropes in Aleppo's Great mosque after the children and women tried to take refuge in the mosque. Timurid soldiers openly raped gentlewomen and virgins in public in both the small mosques and the Great Mosque. The brothers and fathers of the women were being tortured while forced to watch their female relatives get raped. The corpses in the streets and mosques resulted in stink permeating Aleppo. The women were kept naked while being gang raped repeatedly by different men. Ibn Arabshah witnessed the slaughters and rapes Timur's Mongol soldiers carried out.

Damascus regent Sudun, Aleppo regent Tamardash, Gaza regent Omar bin Tahhani, in addition to Baalbek regent Altunboga Osmani and Sheikh Ali El Haseki were captured by the Timurids and put in chains.

== Aftermath ==
After the sack of Aleppo, Timur's forces went south where they took Hama, along with nearby Homs and Baalbek, until they reached Damascus which was also sacked after defeating Mamluk forces led by Nasir-ad-Din Faraj. Damascus had capitulated without a battle to Timur in December 1400 since the Mamluk Sultan who led his army from Egypt only fought minor skirmishes before fleeing back to Cairo with the Sultan claiming he needed to stop a rival from taking power.

== Bibliography ==
- Tucker, Spencer C. (2011). Battles That Changed History: An Encyclopedia of World Conflict. ABC-CLIO. ISBN 978-1-59884-429-0.
- Kanat, Cüneyt (2022). Memluk-Timurlu Münasebetleri (1382-1447) (in Turkish). Türk Tarih Kurumu. ISBN 9789751752239.
- Natanzi, Mu'ineddin (2022). Müntehabü't-Tevarih-İ Mu'İni (in Turkish). Bilgeoğuz Yayınları. ISBN 978-6256359710.
