= Khanqah of Faraj ibn Barquq =

Mosque in Cairo, Egypt

- خانقاه فرج ابن برقوق
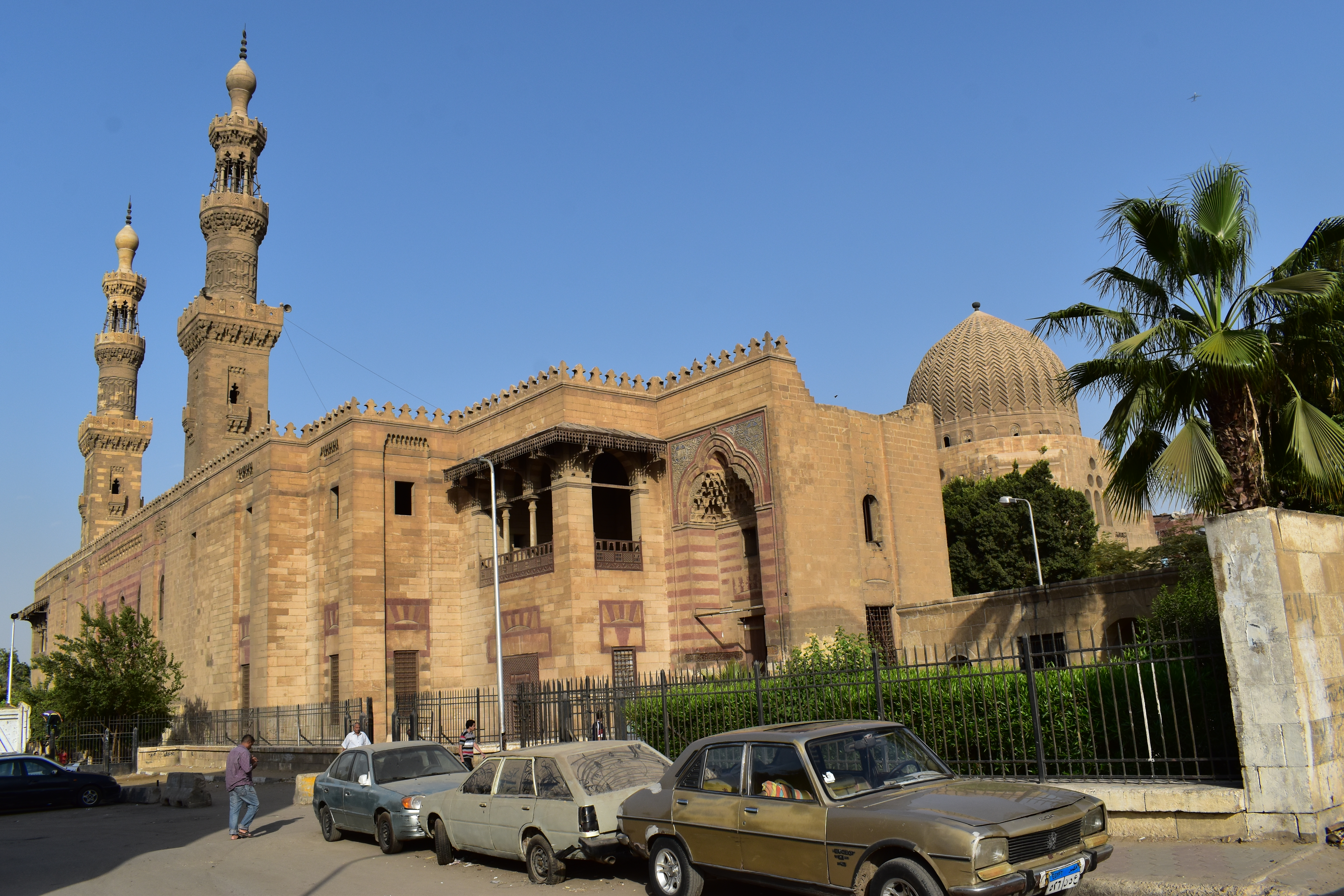

Religion
- Affiliation: Sunni Islam
- Ecclesiastical or organisational status: Mosque
- Status: Active

Location
- Location: Northern Cemetery, Islamic Cairo
- Country: Egypt
- Interactive map of Khanqah of Faraj ibn Barquq
- Coordinates: 30°02′57″N 31°16′44″E

Architecture
- Type: Mosque, khanqah, mausoleum, sabil-kuttab
- Style: Mamluk
- Founder: Al-Nasir Faraj
- Completed: 1411

Specifications
- Domes: 3 (2 large, 1 small)
- Dome dia. (outer): 14.3 m (47 ft)
- Minaret: 2
- Materials: Stone

The Khanqah of Faraj ibn Barquq (Arabic: خانقاه فرج ابن برقوق) is an Islamic funerary complex that comprises a mosque (originally a khanqah) and two mausoleums, located in the Northern Cemetery of Cairo, Egypt. The complex was completed in 1410–1411 by the Mamluk sultan Faraj ibn Barquq. The complex is considered one of the most accomplished works of Mamluk architecture and one of the major monuments of Cairo's Northern Cemetery.

== History ==
=== Background ===
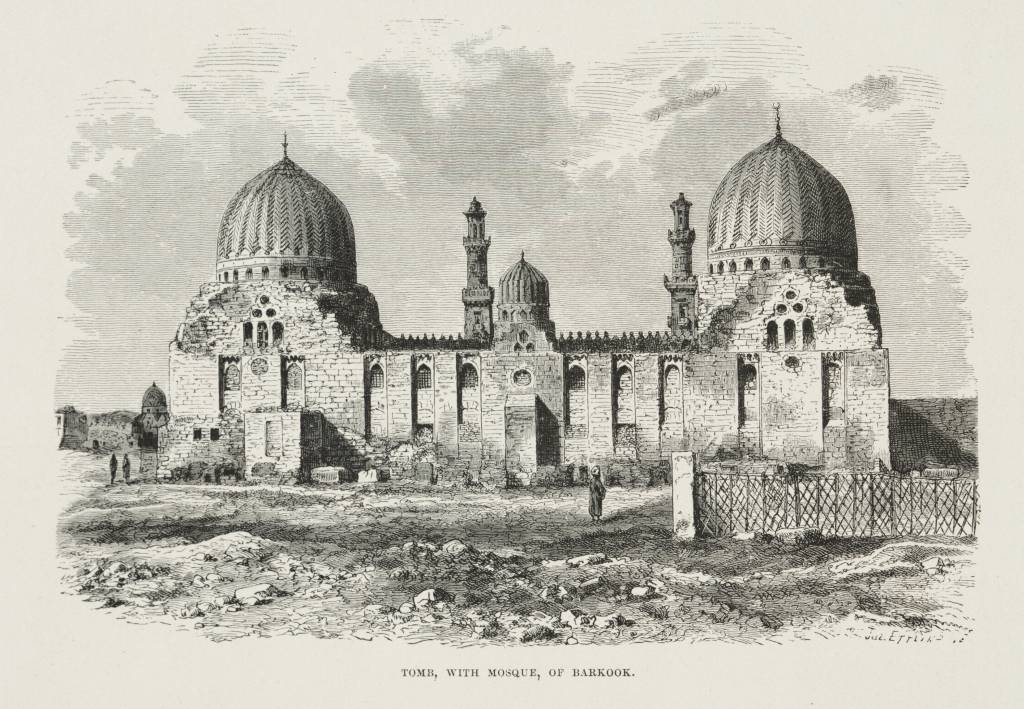
An 1878 illustration of the complex, showing its profile from the back (eastern) side. The two large mausoleum domes are visible at the mosque's corners. The smaller dome in the middle stands above the mihrab area.

Sultan Faraj's monument is considered by many, including Mamluk historians, to be one of the finest buildings of Mamluk architecture in Cairo. Its creation is considered all the more remarkable considering that Faraj's reign was characterized by political unrest, destruction, and economic difficulties. Faraj was unable to prevent devastating incursions by Timur (Tamerlane) into Syria (starting in 1400), and he was deposed briefly in 1405 before regaining the throne. His critics held him responsible for financial mismanagement, which drained the treasury, and for oppressive taxation. He was eventually deposed and assassinated in 1411, at the age of 23.

The creation of this funerary complex was first ordered by Faraj's father, Sultan Barquq, who expressed a desire to be buried in the desert close to the existing tombs of Islamic saints and scholars, instead of in the urban funerary complex he had built at Bayn al-Qasrayn in central Cairo. Barquq had already allocated a fund of 80,000 dinars for the task, which was carried out by his son and successor. Barquq himself was buried on this site upon his death in 1399, before the building itself was constructed.

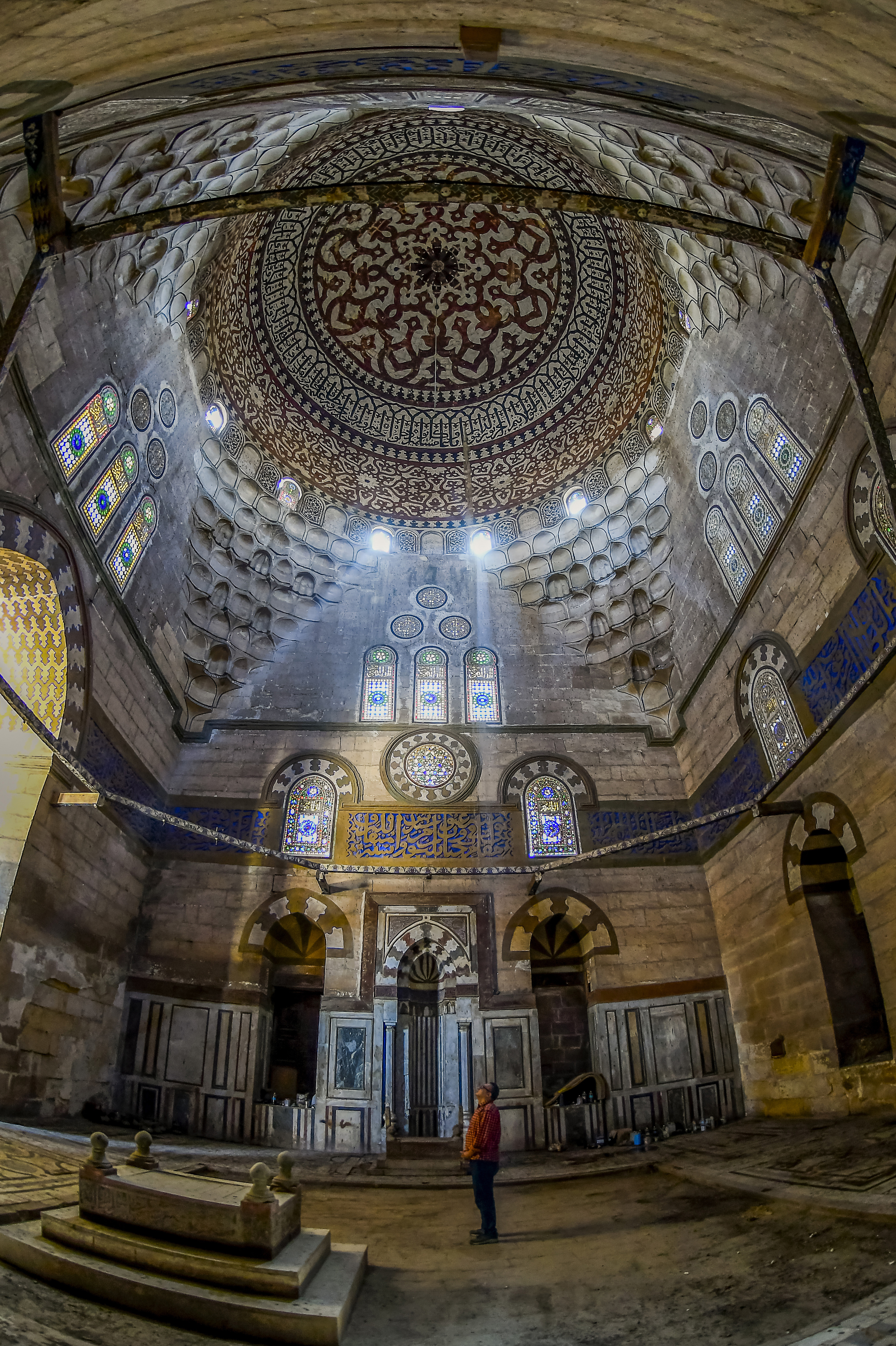
The southern mausoleum chamber

The building's location is in what is now known as the Northern Cemetery, one of the historic Cairo necropolises collectively known as the Qarafa. Today the area is dotted with other Mamluk tombs from the Burji period and is filled with other cemeteries as well as modern residential buildings. At the time of the building's construction, however, this area was largely empty and uninhabited (or sparsely inhabited) desert land outside the city. There was nonetheless an important caravan road here which was part of the road to Mecca, which meant that travelers still regularly passed through the area. Faraj's funerary complex, a khanqah with facilities for its residents, was intended to encourage urbanization of this area. Faraj originally intended to establish some marketplaces here and build other facilities, but this process never fully took place, perhaps in part because of his early death. Sultan Qaytbay made a similar attempt nearby with his own funerary complex later that century, which was described as a "royal suburb", but urbanization of the surrounding area never fully occurred until much later.

=== Construction ===
The supervisor of construction is named as amir Lajin al-Turuntay, likely appointed by Faraj, although Barquq had previously appointed amir Yunus al-Dawadar to this role. The timeline of construction is largely known according to official inscriptions found on the building. The northern mausoleum chamber, where Faraj and his father Barquq are buried, has an inscription dating it to 1400–1401 (803 AH) and attributing it to Faraj acting on the orders of Barquq. A second inscription there states that it was completed in 1405 by Sultan Abd-al Aziz, another son of Barquq who briefly replaced Faraj as sultan that year. Faraj returned to the throne and eventually completed the building in 1410–1411 (813 AH). The southern mausoleum was the last part to be finished, while the mosque area in between the mausoleums was likely finished earlier. This was a long construction period by Mamluk standards, but the chaos and interruptions of Faraj's reign are most likely the reason for this.

== Architecture ==
=== Overview and layout ===
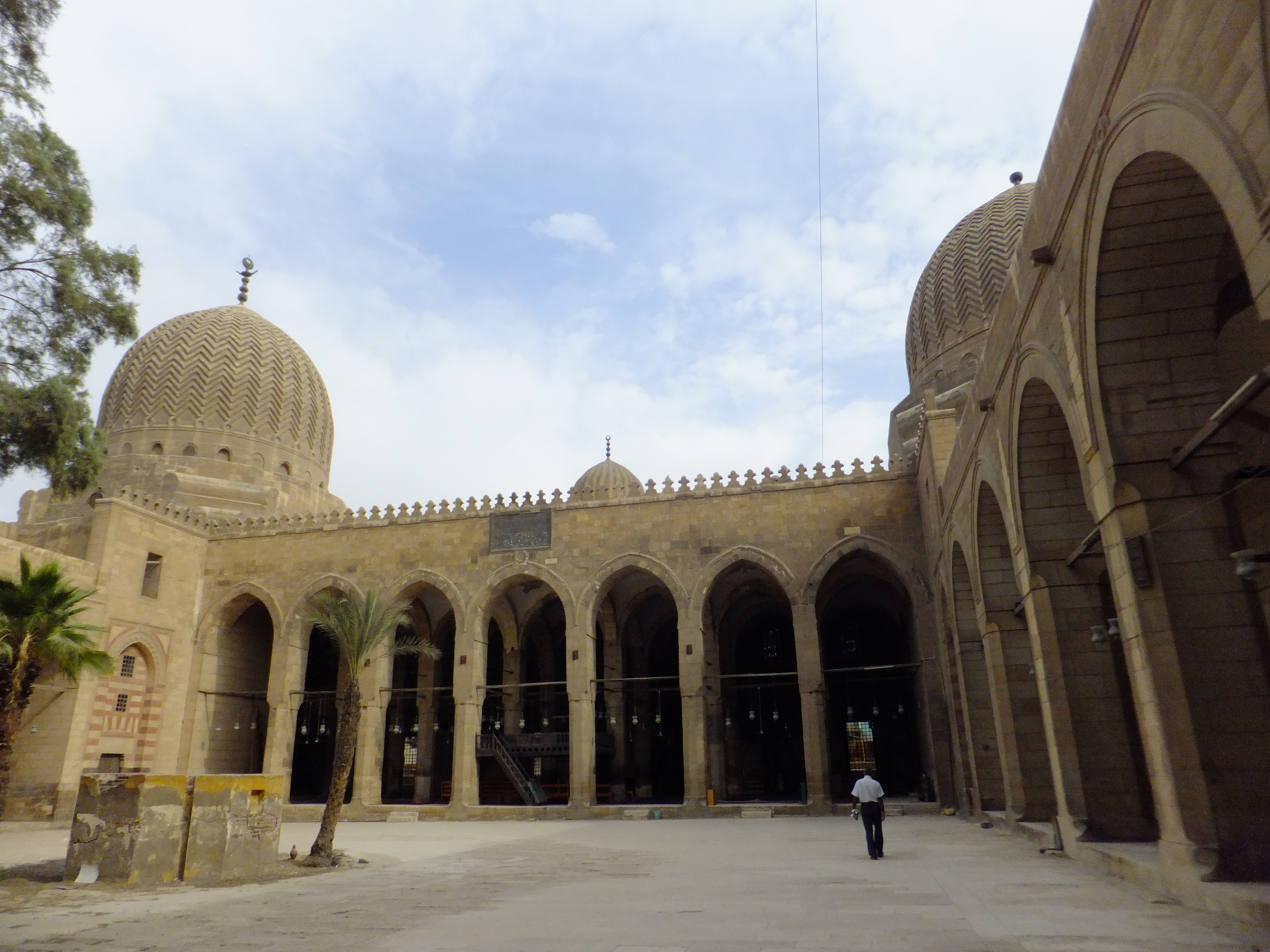
The central courtyard, looking towards the prayer hall (center) and the mausoleums (the large domes on the left and right)

The complex was designated primarily as a khanqah. It is centered around a large central courtyard, surrounded by living quarters to the west and adjoining a prayer hall or mosque section to the east, which in turn is flanked by two large mausoleums on either side. The complex also features two minarets, two sabils, and two kuttabs in an almost symmetrical arrangement on its western facade. The overall layout is similar to that of a regular congregational mosque, which is indeed a function that the building also served.

The complex has a nearly square floor plan that measures 72 by 73 metres (236 by 240 ft). Its broad symmetrical layout is rare in the Mamluk era, as sultans and amirs most frequently built their complexes in the city, where space restrictions required inventive and asymmetrical floor plans in order to accommodate their surroundings. The fact that Faraj's complex was built in the open desert outside the city allowed for this fairly unique monument which makes full use of the space: two mausoleums are spread to either side at the mosque section's eastern corners, and two minarets stand apart from each other above the eastern facade. The placement of the domed mausoleums at these corners made them fully visible to travelers passing along the road, while at the same time making them easily accessible to those praying in the mosque inside. This made it easier for both visitors inside and passers-by outside to offer prayers to the deceased sultan and his family buried here; a consideration which was often important in the placement of Mamluk tombs.

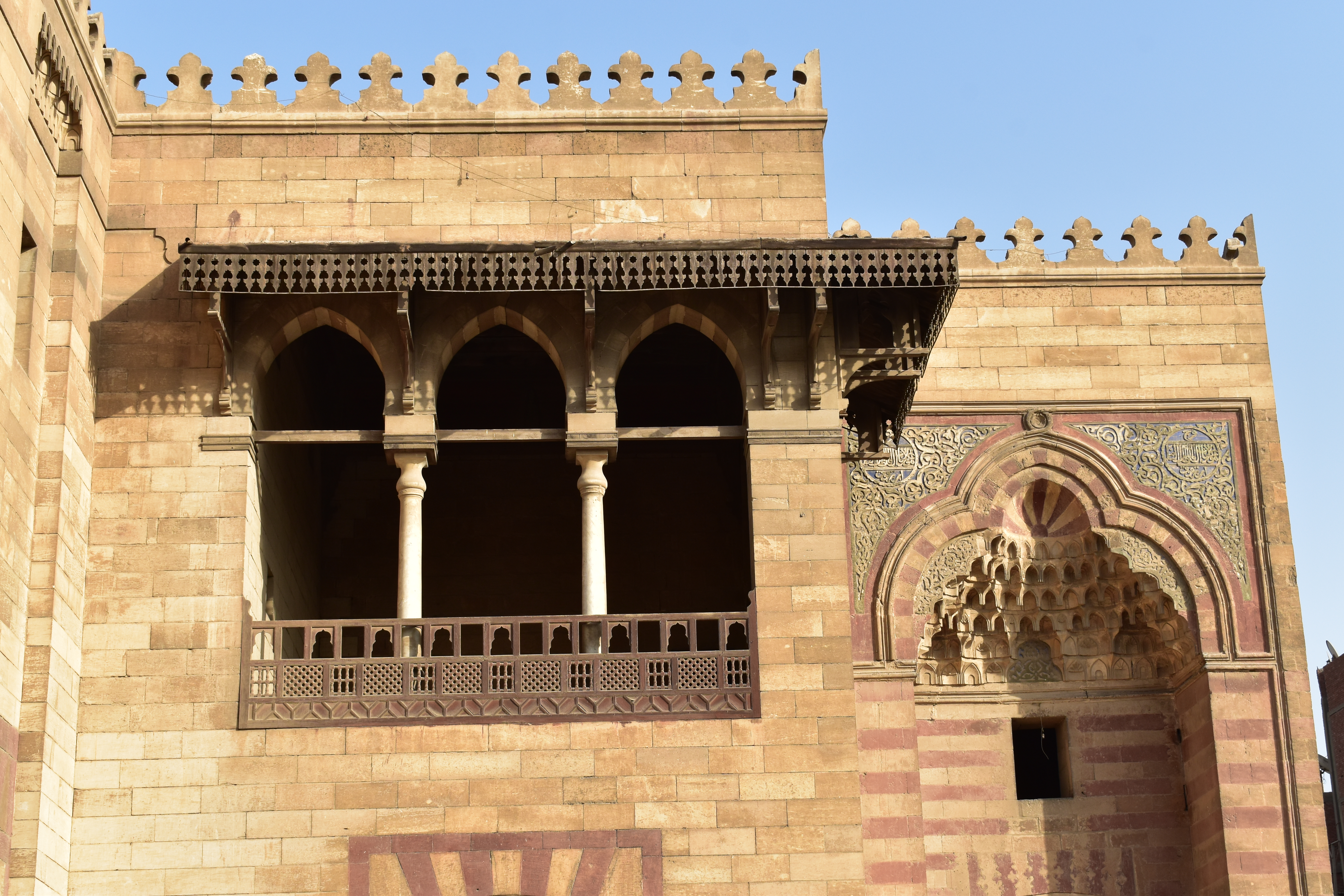
The upper part of the entrance portal (right) and one of the kuttabs (left)

The building has two entrances, one next to each kuttab, though the southwestern one is the most publicly accessible entrance today. The southwestern entrance also presents the only notable asymmetry in the architectural layout; instead of being integrated into the main square floor plan of the building, it projects outwards from the rest of the building and is attached to a small square chamber which seemed to have been intended as a reception hall.

=== Prayer hall ===
The prayer hall is attached to the east side of the sahn. It is mostly plain in appearance but is also characterized by its uncommon stonework; instead of the usual wooden ceiling found elsewhere in most Mamluk (or Cairene) mosques, the ceiling is composed of stone vaults. A small dome also rises over the space in front of the mihrab. A stone dikka stands at the edge of the prayer hall.

The minbar is also made of stone and features excellent craftsmanship with carved geometric patterns. It was a later donation from Sultan Qaytbay in 1483 and reflects the artistic quality of that time. The geometric patterns and overall form of the minbar are imitative of the traditional designs used for the more common wooden minbars of the era.

The entrances to the mausoleums are found on either side of the prayer hall. Both are guarded by wooden screens with geometric patterns. The patterns are similar to the wooden screens used on the outer windows of Barquq's madrasa complex on al-Mu'izz street. The screen of the southern mausoleum is original while the northern one is from a later restoration.

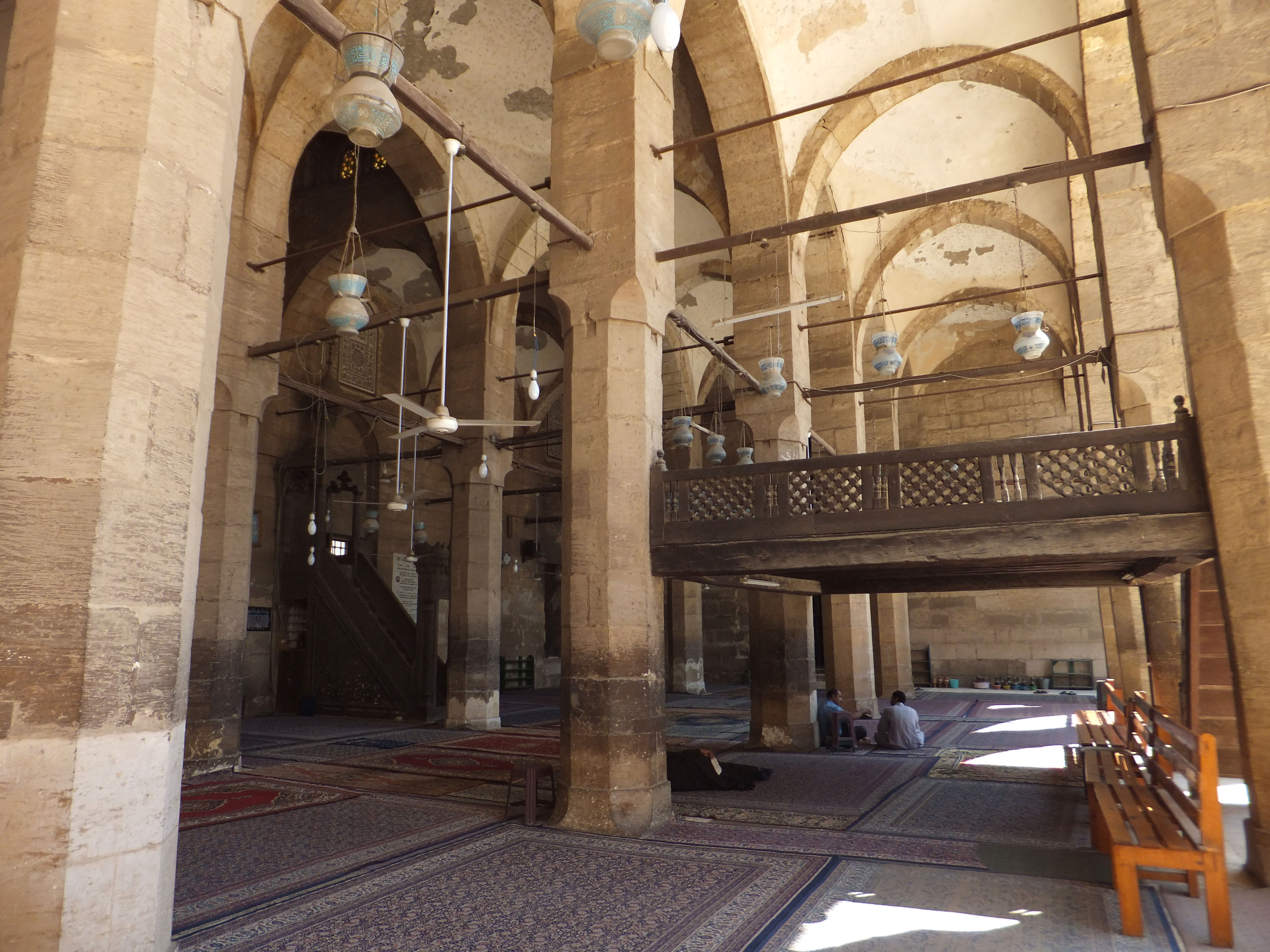
The prayer hall (with the dikka on the right)

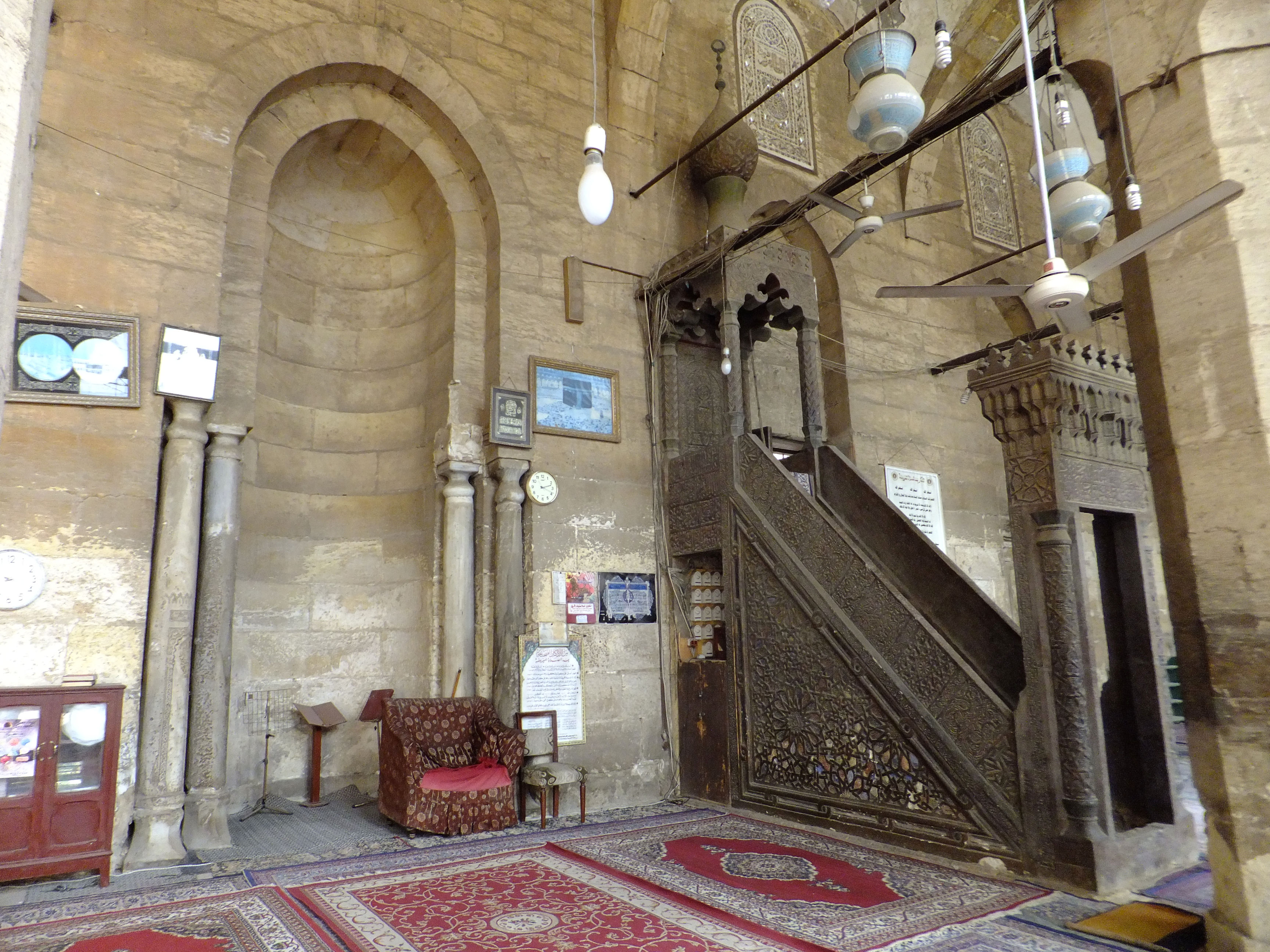
The mihrab (left) and minbar (right)

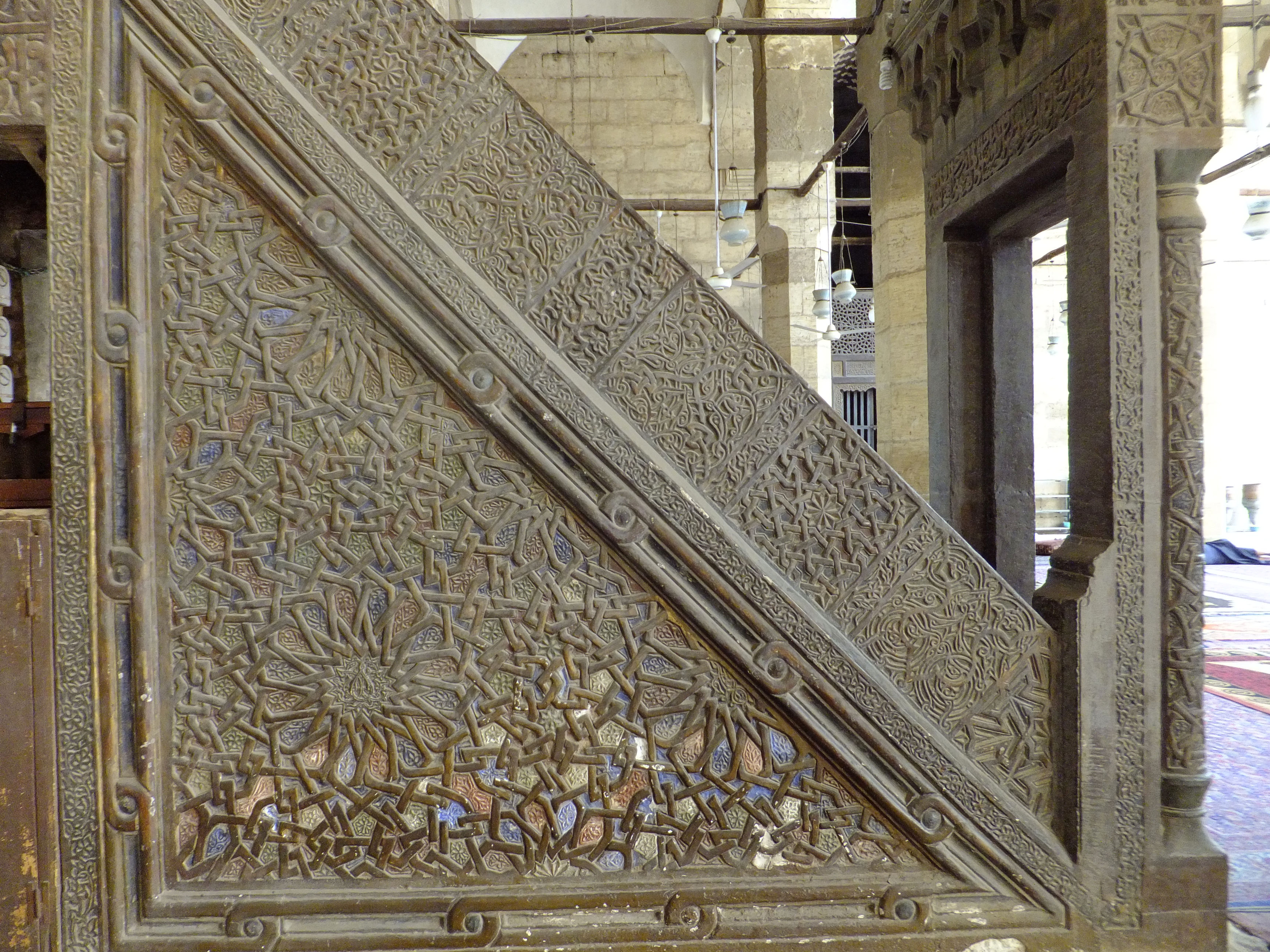
Detail of the carved stone minbar

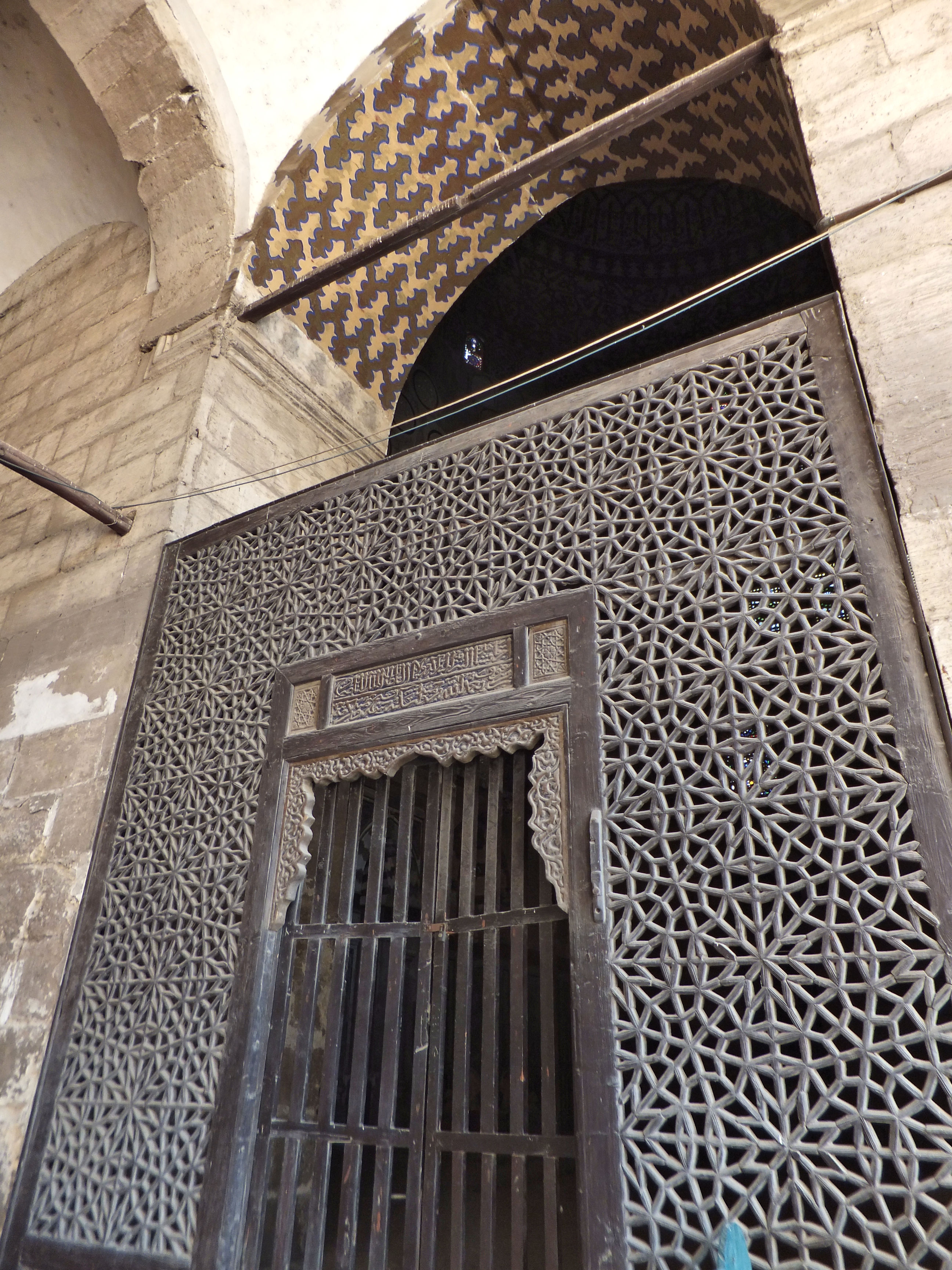
Wooden screen at the entrance of the southern mausoleum

=== Mausoleums and their domes ===
The large stone domes of the mausoleums represent an important step in the development of Mamluk architecture and a high point of Mamluk engineering. They are the earliest large domes in Cairo to be made of stone (earlier ones were usually in wood). They remain the largest stone domes of the Mamluk period in Cairo, with a diameter of 14.3 metres (47 ft). On the outside, the domes are carved with a zigzag pattern which had previously been used on the mausoleum of Jamal al-Din Mahmud al-Ustadar (1395) and would go on to be repeated multiple times after this, foreshadowing the more elaborate carved domes of the late Mamluk period.

The northern mausoleum chamber contains the tombs of both Sultan Barquq and Sultan Faraj (ibn Barquq), while the southern mausoleum chamber is dedicated to the tombs of female relatives. Both mausoleum chambers are decorated with marble paneling, their own mihrab (niche indicating the direction of prayer), and a large inscription band along the wall. The dome ceilings are painted with motifs that simulate traditional Mamluk marble decoration that would otherwise be too heavy use here.

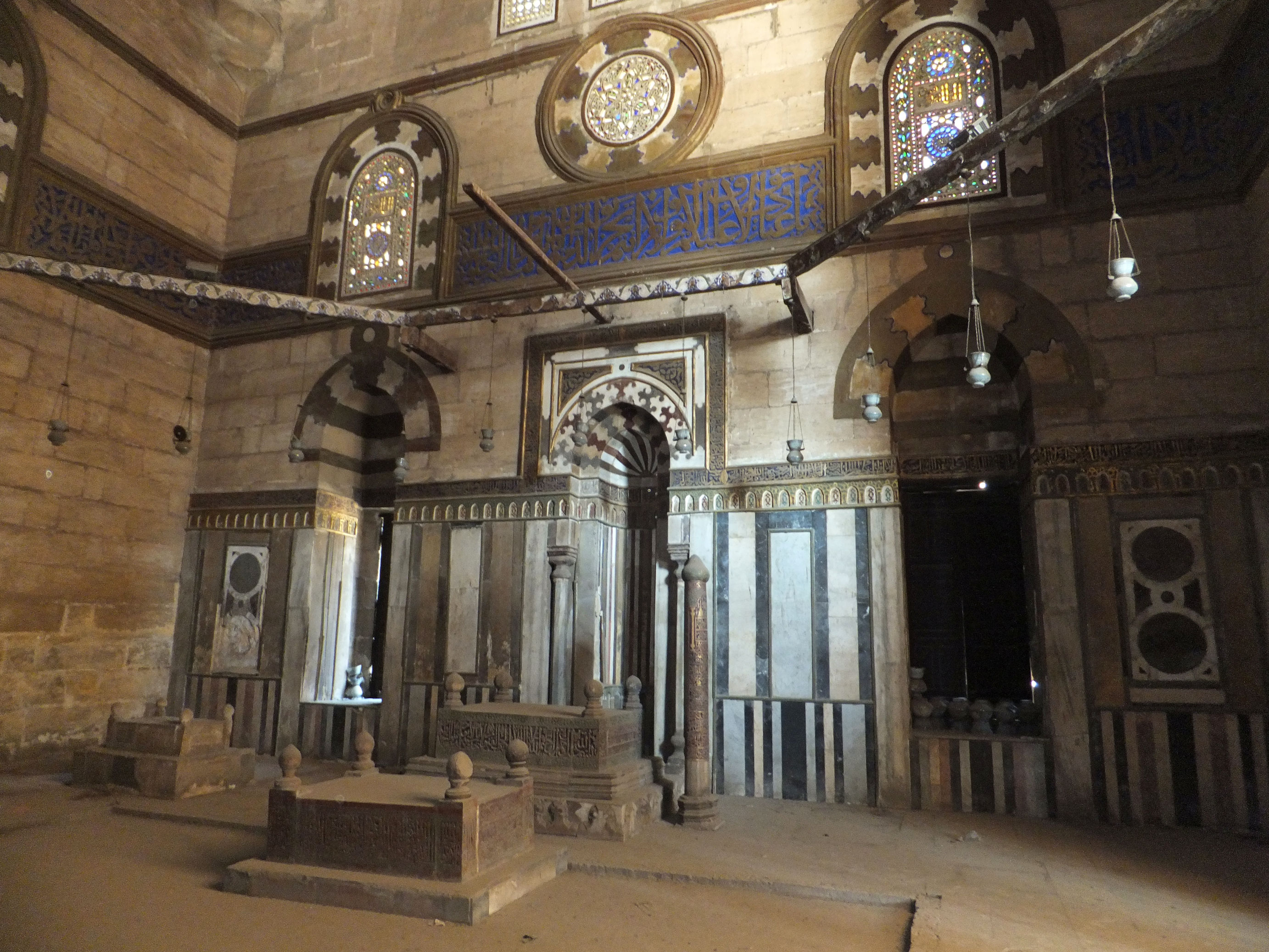
Mihrab and tombs in the northern mausoleum chamber. The largest cenotaph belongs to Faraj ibn Barquq, the others belong to his father Barquq and other male relatives.

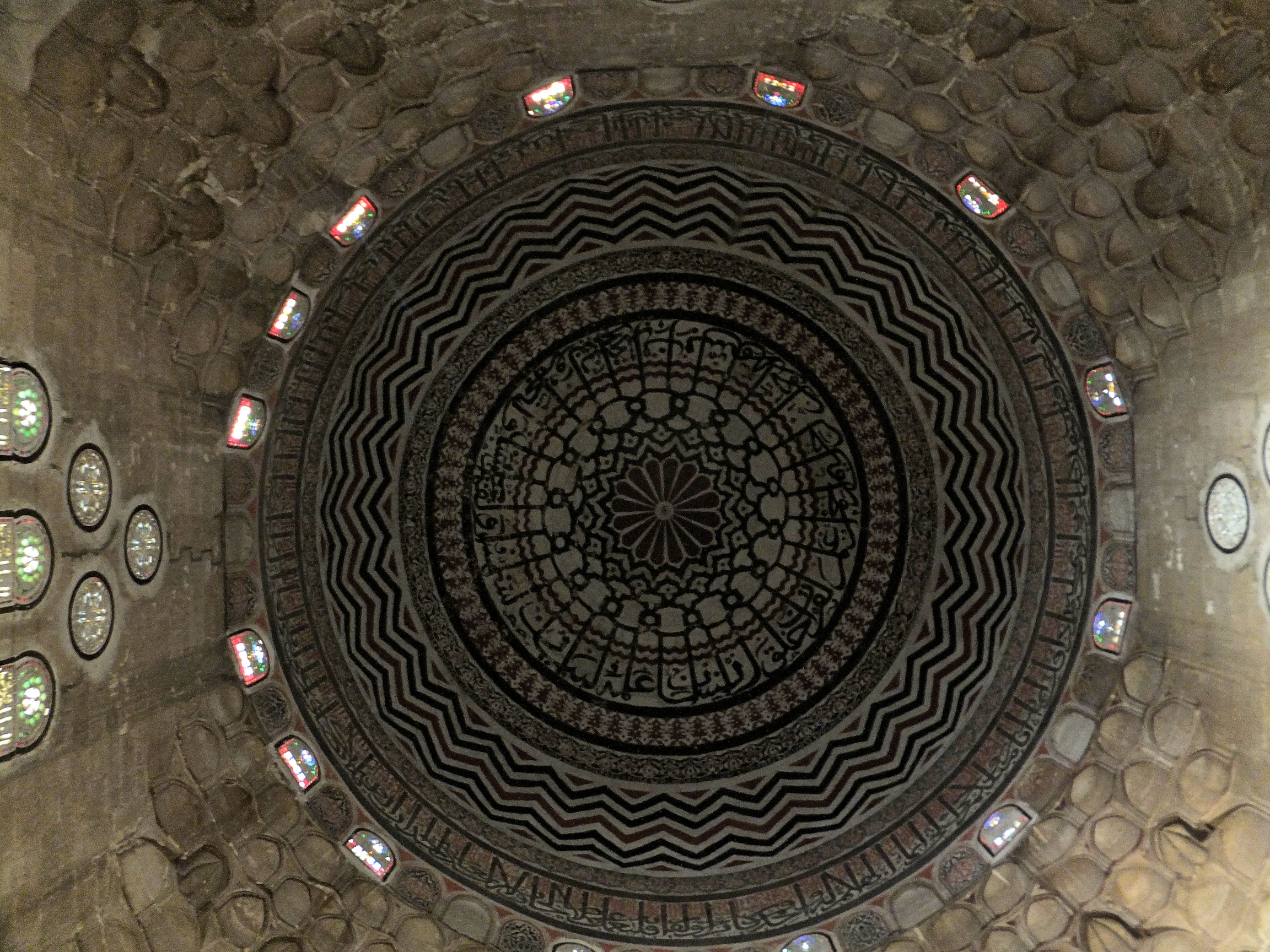
Dome of the northern mausoleum

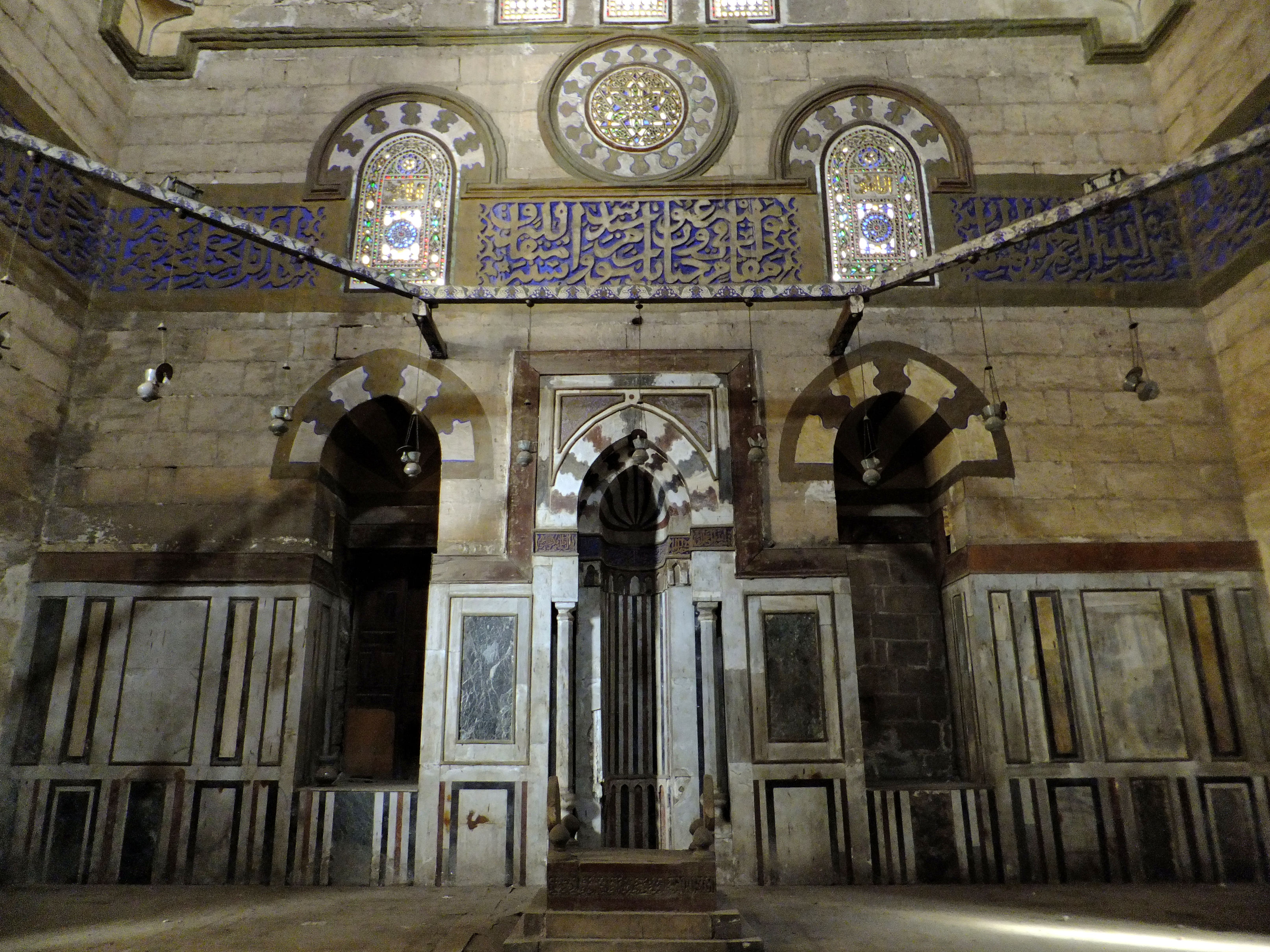
Mihrab and tombs in the southern mausoleum chamber. Faraj ibn Barquq's female relatives are buried here.

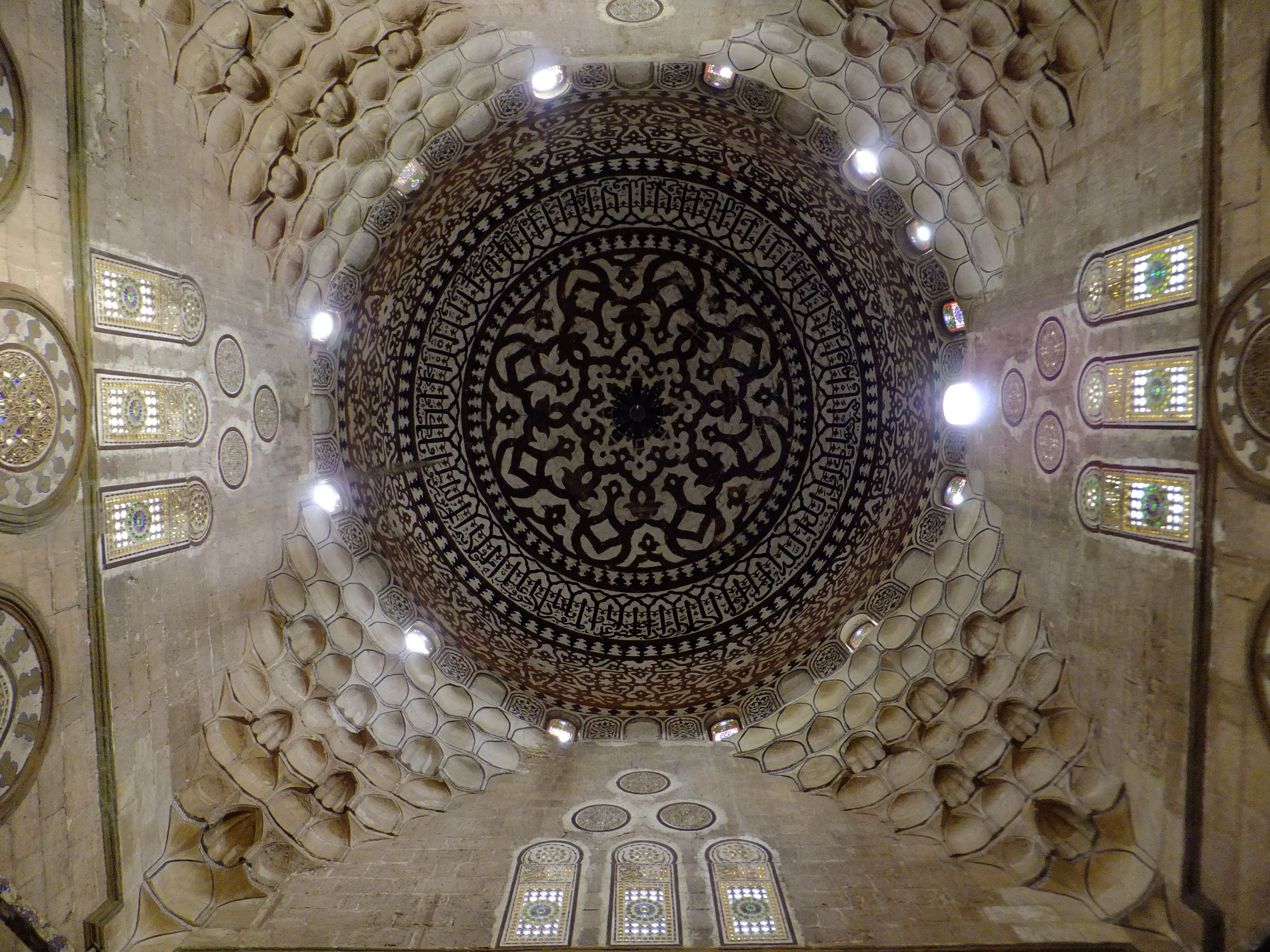
Dome of the southern mausoleum

== See also ==
- Islam in Egypt
- List of mausoleums in Egypt
- List of mosques in Cairo
- List of Historic Monuments in Cairo
- Late medieval domes
