= Corbett Centre for Maritime Policy Studies =

British think tank

The Corbett Centre for Maritime Policy Studies is a policy think-tank which conducts research and teaching on issues related to maritime security.

== History ==
The Corbett Centre for Maritime Policy Studies was launched on 17 September 2007 by Admiral Sir Jonathon Band, First Sea Lord and Chief of the Naval Staff, Royal Navy. The centre aims to promote the understanding and analysis of maritime history and policy and to provide a forum for the interaction of academics, policy-makers and practitioners.

The Corbett Centre takes its name from Sir Julian Corbett who was a prominent British naval historian and geostrategist of the late nineteenth and early twentieth centuries, whose works helped shape the Royal Navy's reforms of that era. The current director is Professor Geoffrey Till.

The Corbett Centre is based at the Defence Studies Department of King's College London, which is part of the Joint Services Command and Staff College in the UK Defence Academy. It also has links with other academic departments, particularly the Department of War Studies, and has connections with other institutions, both official and independent, with an interest in maritime matters, including the Development, Concepts and Doctrine Centre (DCDC), Laughton Unit, the Naval Staff of the Ministry of Defence and the Naval Historical Branch.

== Research areas ==
Current expertise includes: energy security and the Gulf of Guinea; maritime security in the Straits of Malacca; threats to maritime trade; piracy, terrorism and weak states; regional leaders: the South African navy; new and rising navies; rebalancing the Royal Navy; the challenge of irregular warfare at sea; the development of the US Navy: Implications for the naval world; underwater minerals and energy sources; the LNG threat: implications for the ocean regime; land based threats to maritime traffic; national identity, seablindness and seapower; and the naval ethos.

== Publications ==
The Corbett Centre for Maritime Policy Studies Series is the publishing platform of the Corbett Centre. Edited by Greg Kennedy, Tim Benbow, John Robb-Webb and produced by Ashgate Publishing, the Corbett Centre Series aims to promote the understanding and analysis of maritime history and policy and to provide an opportunity to stimulate research and debate into a broad range of maritime related themes. The core subject matter for the series is maritime strategy and policy, conceived broadly to include theory, history and practice, military and civil, historical and contemporary, British and international aspects.
