= Jonathan Reed Winkler =

American historian

Jonathan Reed Winkler (born 1975) is a historian and a professor of history at Wright State University in Dayton, Ohio. He teaches and researches on U.S. foreign relations, U.S. military and naval history, international history, security studies and strategic thought. He is the author of Nexus: Strategic Communications and American Security in World War I (Harvard University Press, 2008), winner of several prizes including the Birdsall Prize of the American Historical Association. His articles, commentaries and reviews have appeared in Diplomatic History, The Journal of Military History, the Naval War College Review, and other venues.
