= Greg Kennedy (historian) =

Canadian military historian and author

- Education: University of Saskatchewan, Royal Military College of Canada, University of Alberta
- Occupations: Author and Historian
- Writing career
- Subjects: Maritime history, Strategic thought, Diplomatic history

Greg Kennedy is a Canadian military historian and author who currently teaches Strategic Foreign Policy at King's College London. He is also the 2002 winner of the Theodore and Franklin D. Roosevelt Prize in Naval History.

== Education ==
Kennedy received his BA in history from University of Saskatchewan and his MA in war studies from Royal Military College of Canada. He then got his PhD from University of Alberta.

== Career ==
Kennedy taught both history and war studies as an adjunct professor at Royal Military College of Canada. He joined King's College London in 2000, and was based at the Joint Services Command and Staff College in Shrivenham.

Kennedy is a member of the British Empire at War Research Group and serves as the director of the Corbett Centre for Maritime Policy Studies, a think tank based out of the Defence Studies Department at King's College London.

=== Awards ===
In 2002, Kennedy was awarded the Theodore and Franklin D. Roosevelt Prize in Naval History for his book Anglo-American Strategic Relations and the Far East 1933–1939.

In 2011, Kennedy was also the recipient of the Society for Military History's Moncado Award, given to "authors of the four best articles published in The Journal of Military History during the previous calendar year".

== Publications ==
- Far-flung lines : essays on imperial defence in honour of Donald Mackenzie Schurman (with Keith Neilson and D M Schurman). London; Portland, OR: Frank Cass, 1997. ISBN 9780714642161. OCLC 36122963.
- The merchant marine in international affairs, 1850-1950. London; Portland, OR: Frank Cass, 2000. ISBN 9780714644714. OCLC 44270303.
- Anglo-American Strategic Relations and the Far East 1933–1939. London; Portland, OR : Frank Cass, 2002. ISBN 9780714651880. OCLC 48570896.
- Incidents and international relations : people, power, and personalities (with Keith Neilson). Westport, Conn.: Praeger, 2002. ISBN 9780275965969. OCLC 47868724.
- British naval strategy east of Suez, 1900-2000: influences and actions. London; New York: Frank Cass, 2005. ISBN 9780714655390. OCLC 55019568.
- Imperial defence: the old world order 1856-1956. London; New York: Routledge, 2008. ISBN 9780415355957. OCLC 191872967.
- British propaganda and wars of empire: influencing friend and foe 1900-2010 (with Christopher Tuck). Farnham Surrey UK; Burlington, VT: Ashgate Publishing Limited, [2014]. ISBN 9781409451730. OCLC 857743861.
