= Geoffrey Rossano =

American Historian

Geoffrey Louis Rossano was an American author and historian with an emphasis on aviation, maritime and military history. He died after a long struggle with kidney failure on July 23, 2021. He lived in Salisbury, Connecticut, and was an instructor in history at the Salisbury School and the school archivist. He was the 2010 winner of the Theodore and Franklin D. Roosevelt Naval History Prize for Stalking the U-Boat: U.S. Naval Aviation In Europe During World War I, a book that comprehensively examines how naval aviation during WW1 proved the usefulness of aviation in fleet operations. Rossano's most recent book was Hero of the Angry Sky: the World War I diary and letters of David S. Ingalls, America's first naval ace.

== Early life ==
Rossano received a BA from Tufts University and both his MA and PhD from the University of North Carolina, Chapel Hill. His PhD was in American history and his dissertation was titled, “A subtle revolution: the urban transformation of rural life, New Gloucester, Maine, 1775-1930” (completed in 1980).

== Career ==
Some of Rossano's early projects include a series of Historic and Architectural Resource Surveys beginning in 1996 and running until 2003. The subjects of these surveys were the Connecticut towns of Sharon, Voluntown, Union, Lisbon, Sprague, Griswold, Manchester, Franklin and Orange and they were published with the support of the State Historic Preservation Office (formerly the Connecticut Historical Commission). Before becoming a teacher, Rossano worked in New York state government in the Office of the State Comptroller and the State Senate. During this period, he served as vice president of the State's Urban Development Corporation.

Rossano also consulted on projects such as “museum exhibits, historic building surveys, and research reports” for local museums and historical societies.

== Personal life ==
Rossano was married to Joan Baldwin and had two daughters.

== Awards and recognition ==
- 2010 Theodore and Franklin D. Roosevelt Naval History Prize, Winner
- 2013 Admiral Arthur Radford Award for Excellence in Naval Aviation history and literature, Winner

== Bibliography ==
- Creating a dignified past: museums and the colonial revival. Savage, Md.: Rowman & Littlefield, 1991.
- Connecticut's historic national guard armories. [Hartford, Conn.]: Connecticut Historical Commission : Connecticut Military Dept., 1995.
- Built to serve: Connecticut's National Guard Armories 1865-1940. Hartford, Conn.: Connecticut Historical Commission, c2003.
- Stalking the U-boat: U.S. naval aviation in Europe during World War I. Gainesville: University Press of Florida, c2010. ISBN 0813036550.
- Hero of the angry sky: the World War I diary and letters of David S. Ingalls, America's first naval ace. Athens, OH: Ohio University Press, c2013. ISBN 9780821444382.
- The Price of Honor: The World War One Letters of Naval Aviator Kenneth MacLeish.
