= B. Mitchell Simpson =

American lawyer

Lieutenant Commander B. Mitchell Simpson III
- Born: Benjamin Mitchell Simpson III; 1932; Philadelphia, Pennsylvania
- Died: May 9, 2019 (aged 86–87); Cambridge, Massachusetts
- Spouse: Wilma
- Military career
- Allegiance: United States
- Branch: United States Navy
- Service years: 1956-1977; 20 years
- Rank: Lieutenant Commander
- Nickname: Tony
- Awards: Theodore and Franklin D. Roosevelt Prize in Naval History
- Other work: Law Professor, Attorney, Naval Historian, Writer

Lieutenant Commander B. Mitchell Simpson III, U.S. Navy (Ret.) (born Philadelphia, PA, 1932-died Cambridge, MA, 9 May 2019), was a professor of law, attorney, former naval officer, and naval historian, who is best known for his biography of Admiral Harold R. Stark.

== Early life and education ==
Born at Philadelphia, Pennsylvania, in 1932, the son of B. Mitchell Simpson II and Marshall Hall Simpson, he entered Colgate University in 1949 and graduated in 1953 with an A.B. degree with honors in international relations. He went on to the University of Pennsylvania School of Law, where he was awarded the L.L.B. degree in 1956. In 1965, the United States Navy sent him to the Fletcher School of Law and Diplomacy at Tufts University, where he earned an M.A. in international relations in 1966, an M.A.L.D. in 1967, and a Ph.D. in diplomatic history in 1968, having written a dissertation on "Political Considerations between the United States and the French National Committee, 1942-43."

== Naval career ==
Simpson entered the U.S. Navy in 1956 and served for twenty years, retiring as a lieutenant commander in 1977. As a line officer and a legal officer, he served in five ships. While studying at the Fletcher School of Law and Diplomacy as a naval officer in 1965-1968, and later as a visiting lecturer in international politics in 1974-75, Simpson met retired Admiral Harold R. Stark and became interested in this former Chief of Naval Operations. In 1970, Simpson was assigned to the faculty of the U.S. Naval War College, where he taught courses in international law, international relations, naval history, and defense studies. Among his duties, he served as the editor of the Naval War College Press and Naval War College Review from 1975 to 1977. In this role, he increased the output of the Press with several books, including two of his own. On his retirement from active duty, he was retained as an advanced research scholar at the Naval War College, where he spent the following three years researching and writing the biography of Admiral Stark. His book, Admiral Harold R. Stark: Architect of Victory 1939-1945, was published in 1989 and utilized a wide range of public records as well as the admiral's private papers. Simpson's research papers for this were deposited in the Naval War College's Naval Historical Collection.

== Career as attorney and law professor ==
In 1980, Simpson entered the private practice of law in Newport, Rhode Island as the owner of a general practice concentrating on corporate and civil matters, including insurance defense. He appeared in all Rhode Island courts for trial, including the United States District Court, argued appeals on behalf of clients before the Rhode Island Supreme Court, and represented clients in military courts, including general court martial. In 1982-1986, he served as Assistant Town Solicitor in Middletown, Rhode Island and from 1989-1992 was Assistant Minority Counsel for the Rhode Island House of Representatives. Between 1988 and 1996, he was elected to four terms on the Newport, Rhode Island City Council, representing the city's third ward. From 1986 he served as Corporation Counsel for Trinity Church, Newport.

In 1996, Simpson was appointed Professor at the Roger Williams University School of Law in Bristol, Rhode Island.

== Published works ==
=== Books ===
- The Development of Naval Thought, essays by Herbert Rosinski; edited with an introduction by B. Mitchell Simpson III (1977).
- War, Strategy, and Maritime power, edited by B. Mitchell Simpson III. (1977).
- Sailors and Scholars: The Centennial History of the Naval War College by John B. Hattendorf, John R. Wadleigh, and B. Mitchell Simpson III (1984).
- Admiral Harold R. Stark: Architect of Victory 1939-1945 (1989).
- Rhode Island Civil and Appellate Procedure with Commentaries with Robert B. Kent, Hon. Robert G. Flanders, Jr., and David Wollen. (St. Paul: Thomson-West, 2006).

=== Articles ===
- "The Rearming of Germany 1950–1954: A Linchpin in the Political Evolution of Europe". Naval War College Review, (May 1971), pp. 76–90.
- "Current Strategic Theories". Naval War College Review, (May 1972), pp. 76–85.
- "Harold Raynsford Stark" in Robert W. Love, Jr., The Chiefs of Naval Operations I(Annapolis: Naval Institute Press, 1980).
- "The Essential Clausewitz". Naval War College Review, (March–April 1982), pp. 54–61.
- "The Open Meetings Law: Friend and Foe" 1996
- "A Fair Trial: Are Indigents Charged with Misdemeanors Entitled to Court-Appointed Counsel?" Roger Williams Law Review Spring 2000
- "Don't curse 'em, sue 'em! Cell Phone Use While driving as Evidence of Negligence, Rhode Island Bar Journal vol. LVII (March–April 2009).
- contributor to An Introduction to Rhode Island Discovery Practice (MCLE/New England, 2010).
- "Treason and Terror: A Toxic Brew" (2018). Roger Williams University Law Faculty Scholarship. 216.

== Awards ==
- Rhode Island Bar Journal Lauren E. Jones Writing Award
- Theodore and Franklin D. Roosevelt Prize in Naval History

== Personal life ==
Simpson lived in Newport, Rhode Island with his wife of 51 years, Wilma, with whom he had two daughters, Fiona and Isla.
