= Naval War College Review =

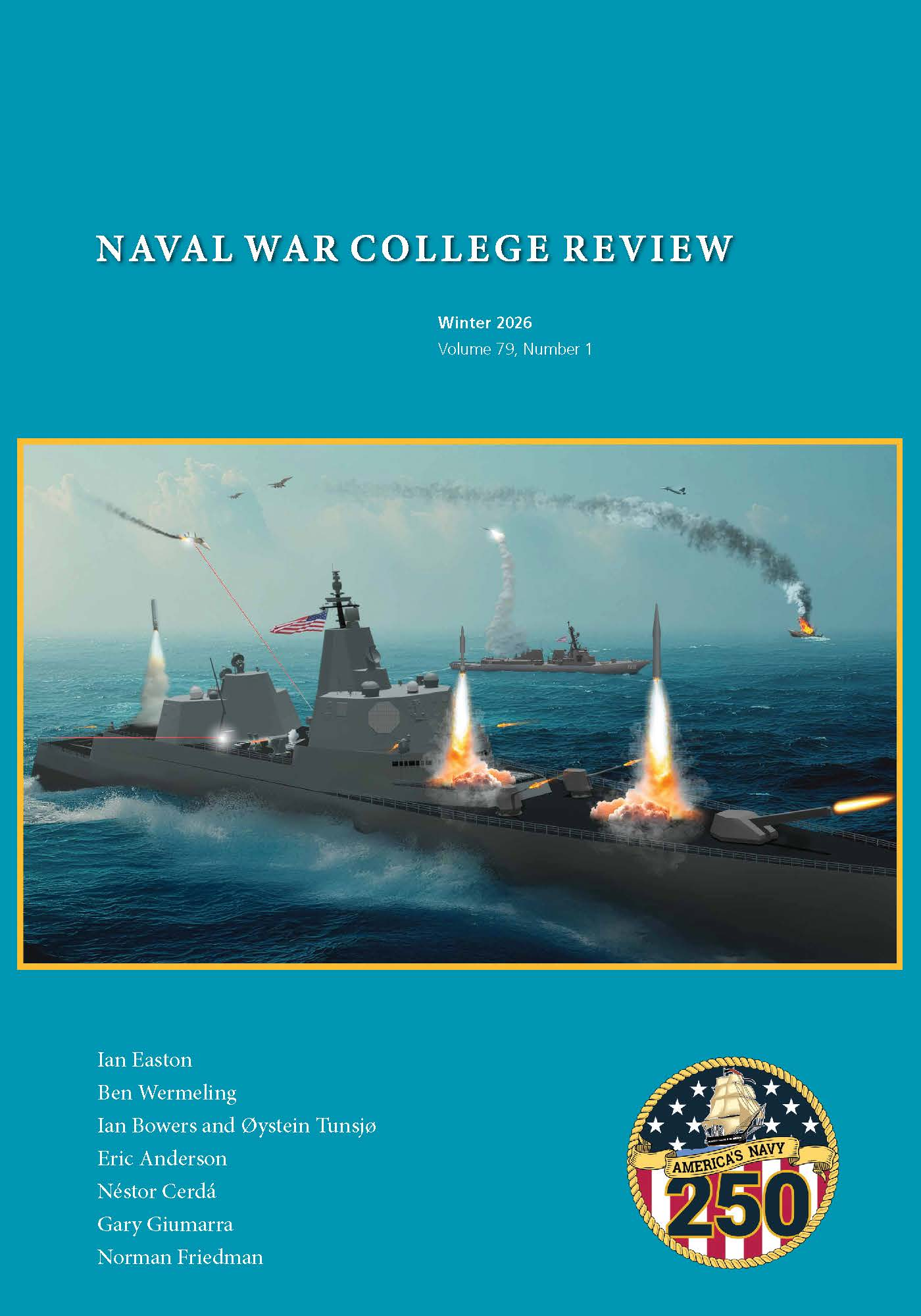
- The cover of a 2026 publication.
- Discipline: Public policy
- Language: English

Publication details
- Former name: Information Service for Officers
- History: 1948-present
- Publisher: Naval War College (United States)
- Frequency: Quarterly
- Open access: Yes
- License: Public domain

Standard abbreviations
- ISO 4: Nav. War Coll. Rev.

Indexing
- ISSN: 0028-1484
- LCCN: 75617787
- OCLC no.: 01779130

Links
- Journal homepage; Online archive

The Naval War College Review is a quarterly peer-reviewed academic journal published by the United States Navy's Naval War College. It covers public policy matters of interest to the maritime services and was established in 1948.

== History ==
During the administration of Admiral Raymond Spruance as president of the Naval War College (1946-1948), plans were initiated to establish a resident civilian faculty, composed of prominent academics who would be visiting faculty members for a full academic year. In a separate, but related initiative in 1948, the Chief of Naval Personnel, Rear Admiral Thomas L. Sprague, suggested to the commandants of the joint service colleges that each college should publish a lecture reprint series that could be distributed to officers, who for various reasons could not attend a war college course. In response to this suggestion and with further authorization from the Navy Department, Spruance initiated publication of a periodical. Initially entitled Information Service for Officers, it first appeared in October 1948 with a lecture by Vice Admiral Robert B. Carney, "Logistical Planning for War," as its lead article. It was initially classified as "Restricted" and issued only to individual officers in the grades of lieutenant commander, major, and above, not to naval activities or commands. The first issue had a circulation of 3,000 copies.

In its fifth year of publication, Information Service for Officers had reached a circulation of 6,000 copies and was being distributed to major commands. At that point, the name was changed to Naval War College Review and, in December 1953, the publication was down-graded to "For Official Use Only," a security classification that remained in effect until September 1964. Further changes in editorial policy that allowed the journal to publish articles by civilian academics did not occur until the editorship of Commander Robert M. Laske between 1968 and 1975, when a dearth of material forced him to search for contributors at meetings of the American Political Science Association and the Inter-University Seminar on the Armed Forces and Society. From that point forward, the journal had a wider range of submitted articles.

=== Editors ===
The following persons have been editors-in-chief:

- Summer 1967-March 1970: Colonel T. C. Dutton, USMC
- Sept/Oct 1972-May/Jun 1975: Commander Robert M. Laske
- Summer 1975 Lieutenant: (junior grade) Jeffrey P. Bacher (interim)
- Fall 1975-Summer 1977: Lieutenant Commander B. Mitchell Simpson, III
- Fall 1977-July/Aug 1981: Commander William R. Pettyjohn
- Sept/Oct 1981: Captain F. C. Caswell, Jr. (interim)
- Nov/Dec 1981-Sept/Oct 1985: Frank Uhlig, Jr.
- Nov/Dec 1985-Summer 1988: Robert M. Laske
- Autumn 1988-Autumn 1993: Frank Uhlig, Jr.
- Winter 1994–Autumn 2002: Thomas B. Grassey
- Spring 2003–Summer/Autumn 2004: Catherine McArdle Kelleher
- Winter 2005-Autumn 2005: Peter Dombrowski
- Winter 2006–Autumn 2023: Carnes Lord
- Winter 2024: Steven P. Stashwick, Managing Editor
- Spring 2024-Winter/Spring 2025: Jon D. Caverley
- Summer/Autumn 2025-present: Sam J. Tangredi
