= Spencer C. Tucker =

American military historian (born 1937)

- Born: Spencer Coakley Tucker; September 20, 1937 (age 89); Buffalo, New York, US
- Education: Virginia Military Institute; University of North Carolina at Chapel Hill (M.A., Ph.D.)
- Spouse: Beverly Blount
- Writing career
- Notable works: The American Civil War: The Definitive Encyclopedia and Document Collection. 6 vols.; Stephen Decatur: A Life Most Bold and Daring.

Spencer Coakley Tucker (born September 20, 1937) is an American military and naval historian. He taught history at Texas Christian University from 1967 to 1997 and held the John Biggs Chair in Military History at the Virginia Military Institute from 1997 to 2003. That year he became senior fellow in military history at ABC-CLIO.

Tucker has written or edited some 70 books, many of them multi-volume reference works. His biography of Stephen Decatur won the 2004 Theodore Roosevelt and Franklin Roosevelt Prize, and his reference works have won the Society for Military History's award for best reference work three times and the American Library Association's Dartmouth Medal.

== Education and career ==
Tucker graduated from the Virginia Military Institute, earning a B.A. in 1959. He was awarded a Fulbright scholarship, which he used to study at the University of Bordeaux, France, from 1959 to 1960. He went on to earn a master's degree (1962) and a doctorate degree (1966) in modern European history at the University of North Carolina at Chapel Hill. From 1965 to 1967, during the Vietnam War era, he was a captain in the U.S. Army and served as an intelligence analyst in the Office of the Assistant Chief of Staff for Intelligence at The Pentagon.

He taught history at Texas Christian University from 1967 to 1997. From 1992 through his departure in 1997, he was chairman of the department. He then held the John Biggs Chair in Military History at the Virginia Military Institute from 1997 to 2003 before he retired from teaching. As a VMI full professor, he was a colonel in the Virginia Militia Unorganized. In 2003 he became senior fellow in military history at ABC-CLIO. He was also editor of a series of monographs on decisive battles of the twentieth century for Indiana University Press, with 25 books in the series published.

He was an active member of the Society for Military History and the North American Society for Oceanic History for years. In World War II: The Definitive Encyclopedia, he estimates that the death toll may have reached a hundred million.

== Awards ==
Tucker has written or edited, as of June 2021, a total of 70 books in those subject areas. His biography of Stephen Decatur, Jr., Stephen Decatur: A Life Most Bold and Daring, won the Theodore Roosevelt and Franklin Roosevelt Prize for best book in naval history in 2004. He has received two John Lyman Book Awards from the North American Society for Oceanic History: in 1989, for Arming the Fleet, and 2000, for Andrew Foote: Civil War Admiral on Western Waters. He has won the Society for Military History award for best reference work three times, the most times that it has been presented to any author, for his Encyclopedia of the Cold War in 2008, the Encyclopedia of the Spanish-American and Philippine-American Wars in 2010, and The American Civil War: The Definitive Encyclopedia and Document Collection (2014). The last work was also recognized with the 2014 Army Historical Foundation Distinguished Writing Award, Reference. Many of his encyclopedias have also been recognized with awards by Booklist and by the Reference and User Association of the American Library Association. The American Revolutionary War: The Definitive Encyclopedia and Document Collection won both the 2018 Outstanding Reference Source award of the Reference and User Services Association of the American Library Association and the Distinguished Writing Award for Research by the Army Historical Foundation. World War I: A Country-by-Country Guide was awarded Honorable Mention for the Norman B. Tomlinson Prize for the best historical work published in English in 2019, by the World War One Historical Association. The Cold War: The Definitive Encyclopedia and Document Collection was awarded the Dartmouth Medal by the American Library Association for the outstanding reference work published in 2020.

== Personal life ==
Tucker lives in Lexington, Virginia, with his wife, Beverly, also an author, and their dachshund, Sophie.

== Bibliography ==
Books written or edited:

- Arming the Fleet: U.S. Navy Ordnance in the Muzzle-loading Era (1989)
- The Jefferson Gunboat Navy (1993)
- The European Powers in the First World War, An Encyclopedia (1996); paperback ed. (1999)
- Injured Honor: The Chesapeake-Leopard Affair, June 22, 1807 (1996)
- Raphael Semmes and the Alabama (1996)
- The Big Guns: Civil War Heavy Ordnance (1997)
- The Great War, 1914-18 (1998)
- Encyclopedia of the Vietnam War. 3 vols (1998)
- Vietnam (1999)
- Andrew Hull Foote, Civil War Admiral (2000); paperback ed. (2018)
- Encyclopedia of the Vietnam War. 1 vol. (2000)
- Encyclopedia of the Korean War. 3 vols. (2000)
- Handbook of Nineteenth-Century Naval Warfare (2000)
- Who's Who in Twentieth-Century Warfare (2001)
- A Short History of the Civil War at Sea (2001)
- Unconditional Surrender: The Capture of Forts Henry and Donelson (2001)
- Encyclopedia of the Korean War. 1 vol. (2002)
- Encyclopedia of Naval Warfare. 3 vols. (2002)
- Brigadier General John D. Imboden: Confederate Commander in the Shenandoah (2002)
- Encyclopedia of U.S. Military History. 3 vols. (2003)
- The Second World War (2003)
- Tanks: An Illustrated History of their Impact (2004)
- Encyclopedia of World War II. 5 vols. (2004)
- Stephen Decatur: A Life Most Bold and Daring (2004)
- Encyclopedia of World War I. 5 vols. (2005)
- Blue and Gray Navies: The Civil War Afloat (2006)
- Encyclopedia of the Cold War. 5 vols. (2007)
- Encyclopedia of Arab-Israeli Conflict. 4 vols. (2008)
- Encyclopedia of North American Colonial Conflicts. 3 vols. (2008)
- Rise and Fight Again: The Life of Nathanael Greene (2009); paperback ed. (2018)
- Encyclopedia of the Spanish-American and Philippine-American Wars. 3 vols. (2009)
- U.S. Leadership in Wartime: Clashes, Controversy, and Compromise. 2 vols. (2009)
- A Global Chronology of Conflict. 6 vols. (2009)
- Encyclopedia of the Korean War. 3 vols. (2010)
- Encyclopedia of U.S. Wars in the Middle East. 5 vols. (2010)
- Civil War Naval Encyclopedia. 2 vols. (2010)
- Battles that have changed History (2010)
- Encyclopedia of the Vietnam War. Rev. ed. 4 vols. (2011)
- Encyclopedia of the North American Indian Wars. 3 vols. (2011)
- World War II at Sea, An Encyclopedia. 2 vols. (2011)
- Encyclopedia of the War of 1812. 3 vols. (2012)
- Encyclopedia of the Mexican-American War. 3 vols. (2012)
- Almanac of American Military History. 4 vols. (2012)
- American Civil War: The Definitive Encyclopedia and Document Collection 6 vols. (2013)
- Encyclopedia of Insurgency and Counterinsurgency. 1 vol. (2013)
- Battles that changed American History: 100 of the Greatest Victories and Defeats. 1 vol. (2014)(108 vols total)
- Encyclopedia of the Wars of the Early American Republic, 1783-1812. 3 vols. (2014)
- The Persian Gulf War Encyclopedia: A Political, Social, and Military History (2014)
- World War I: The Definitive Encyclopedia and Document Collection. 5 vols. (2014)
- Five Hundred Great Military Leaders. 2 vols. (2014)
- The American Civil War, A State-by-State Encyclopedia. 2 vols. (2015)
- Instruments of War: Weapons and Technologies that have changed History (2015)
- Wars that changed History: 50 of the World’s Greatest Conflicts (2015); paperback ed. (2024)
- Pearl Harbor: The Essential Reference Guide (2015)
- U.S. Conflicts in the 21st Century: Afghanistan War, Iraq War, and the War on Terror. 3 vols. (2015).
- World War I: The Essential Reference Guide (2016)
- World War II: The Definitive Encyclopedia and Document Collection. 5 vols. (2016)
- The Roots and Consequences of 20th Century Warfare: Conflicts that shaped the Modern World. (2016)
- The Roots and Consequences of Civil Wars and Revolutions (2017)
- Modern Conflict in the Greater Middle East (2017)
- Enduring Controversies in Military History: Critical Analysis and Context. 2 vols. (2017)
- D-Day: The Essential Reference Guide (2017)
- The Roots and Consequences of Independence Wars (2018)
- American Revolution: The Definitive Encyclopedia and Documents Collection. 5 vols. (2018)
- World War I: A Country-by-Country Guide. 2 vols. (2019)
- Middle East Conflicts from Ancient Egypt to the 21st Century: An Encyclopedia and Documents Collection. 4 vols. (2019)
- Weapons and Warfare. 2 vols. (2020)
- The Cold War: The Definitive Encyclopedia and Document Collection. 5 vols. (2020)
- Great Sieges in World History: From Ancient Times to the 21st Century. (2021); paperback ed. (2025)
- American Revolution, The Essential Reference Guide. (2021)
